= The Forge (Star Trek: Enterprise) =

- Star Trek: Enterprise episode
- Episode no.: Season 4 Episode 7
- Directed by: Michael Grossman
- Written by: Judith Reeves-Stevens; Garfield Reeves-Stevens
- Production code: 407
- Original air date: November 19, 2004

Guest appearances
- Robert Foxworth - Administrator V'Las; Vaughn Armstrong - Admiral Forrest; Gary Graham - Ambassador Soval; Michael Reilly Burke - Koss; Michael Nouri - Arev, aka Syrran; Larc Spies - Stel

Episode chronology
← Previous "The Augments"	Next → "Awakening"
- Star Trek: Enterprise season 4

"The Forge" is the seventh episode of the fourth season of the American science-fiction television Star Trek: Enterprise, and originally aired on November 19, 2004, on UPN. Directed by Michael Grossman, the script was written by Judith and Garfield Reeves-Stevens, and formed the first part of a three-episode arc which continued in "Awakening" and concluded in "Kir'Shara".

Set in the 22nd century, the series follows the adventures of the first Starfleet starship Enterprise, registration NX-01. In this episode, the crew investigates the bombing of the Earth embassy on Vulcan. The evidence led them to suspect a group called the Syrrannites, and Captain Archer and Commander T'Pol seek to cross an unforgiving Vulcan desert, known as "The Forge", to find them. Meanwhile, on the ship, the crew discovers that the evidence was planted by elements linked to Vulcan High Command.

The episode makes several references to Star Trek: The Original Series and The Animated Series. Scenes were filmed in Simi Valley, California to represent the Vulcan Forge, with added digital effects to represent the firestorm and a Vulcan animal called the sehlat. The ratings for "The Forge" had a decrease from the previous two episodes.

== Plot ==
Enterprise is ordered to Vulcan after 12 Vulcans and 31 humans die in the bombing of the United Earth Embassy, including Vice-Admiral Forrest, who is killed saving the life of Ambassador Soval. Captain Archer meets with the head of the Vulcan High Command, Administrator V'Las, who concedes that the Syrrannites, a Vulcan faction, might have been responsible. This is possible since, although they claim peaceful tenets, they follow a "corrupted" form of the teachings of the Vulcan philosopher and father of Vulcan logic, Surak. Further, initial video and DNA evidence lead to a Vulcan named T'Pau, a known Syrrannite.

Koss arrives on board Enterprise to speak to his wife, T'Pol. He gives her an IDIC pendant from her mother, who he explains is also a Syrrannite. The pendant projects a map showing a path across a desert on Vulcan called "the Forge", which Archer believes will lead them to both T'Pau and T'Pol's mother. T'Pol and Archer leave the ship and begin to make the crossing, following the map. They soon encounter another traveller, calling himself Arev, who assists, but remains distrustful of them. A sand-fire storm kills Arev, but before he dies, he forcefully performs a mind meld with Archer to transfer his katra. After burying him, a focused Archer leads T'Pol directly to the concealed T'Karath Sanctuary, where they are quickly captured.

Back on Enterprise, Doctor Phlox discovers that the DNA was planted. Commander Tucker and he then examine security scans near a checkpoint in the embassy and single out a hooded man holding a suspicious package. Furthermore, they notice that the guard at the checkpoint seems to already know who the bomber is. Unfortunately, the guard is in a coma from the blast, and Archer and T'Pol are incommunicado. Though it violates standard Vulcan ethics, Phlox and Tucker consider a mind meld, and Soval decides to perform it himself. To his surprise, he discovers that the suspect is Stel, a Vulcan investigator attached to V'Las. Soval then resolves to inform the High Command.

== Production ==
Production on the episode began on September 14, 2004, and ran through to September 22. The standing sets were used for the first three days of filming. Further sets were created to represent the Vulcan Embassy and portions of the Forge. The final two days were filmed on site in Simi Valley in southern California, which doubled as the main areas of the Forge. The property used in the valley was owned by mining company P.W. Gillibrand, which was near property owned by Vulcan Materials Company. Optical effects were added to represent the firestorm and the sehlat. The CGI sehlat was based on one which previously appeared in Star Trek: The Animated Series episode "Yesteryear". Visual effects producer Dan Curry said that the team "looked at the animated series and it just looked nice and pleasant, so I did a couple of sketches to do a reinterpretation of it to make it look scary, but not be too radical a departure from the original". Eden FX modelled the CGI under supervision by staff visual effects supervisor Art Codron. Additional care was taken to create the fur so that close-ups could be used if required. The only physical portion of the sehlat to be created was a single paw. "Yesteryear" was set in the Vulcan city Shi'Khar, which reappears in "The Forge", and it is also the first mention of the area on Vulcan called the Forge. A further reference was made to "Vulcan's Forge" in the Deep Space Nine episode "Change of Heart".

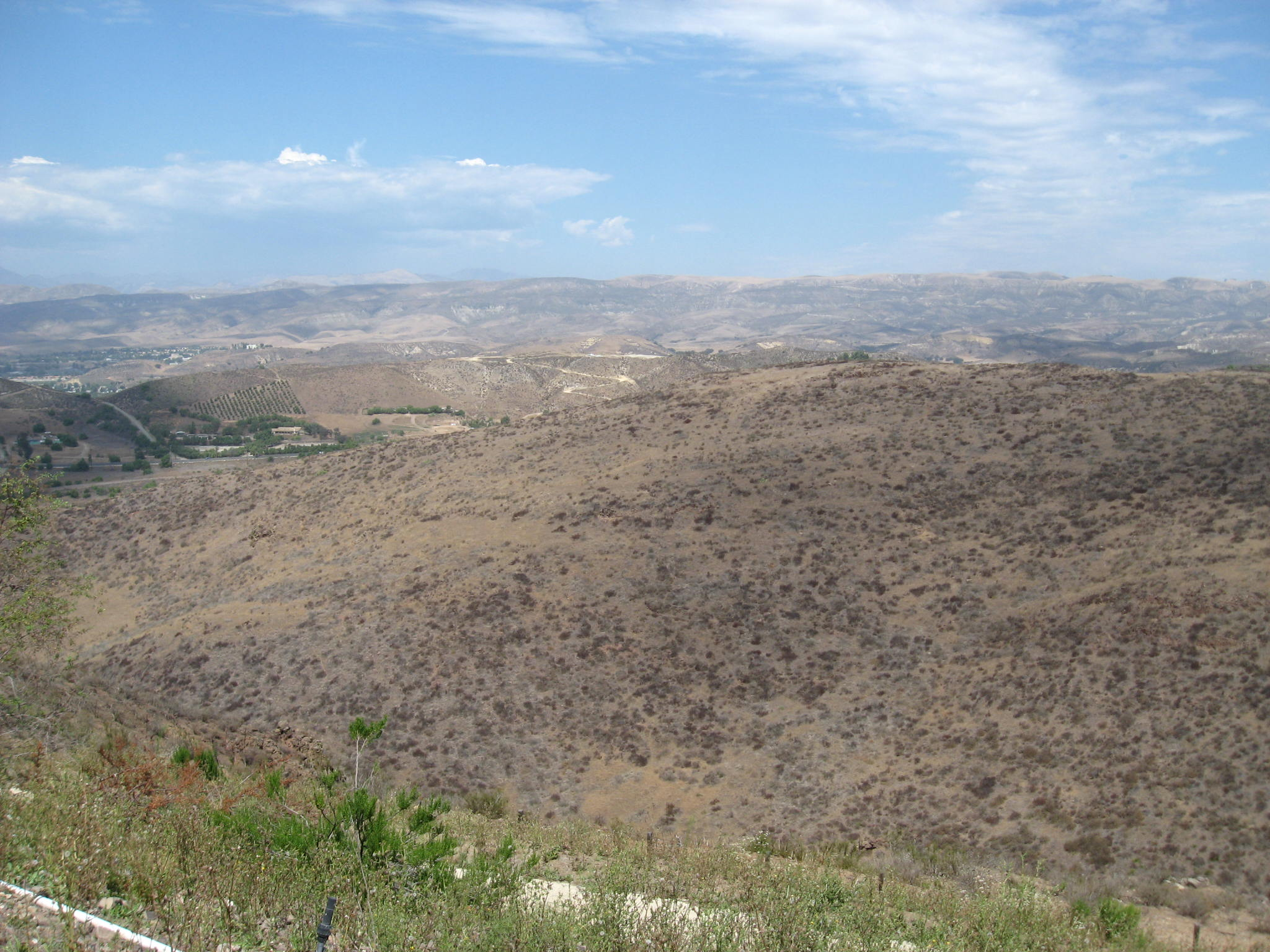
Simi Valley, California, doubled as the desert-like Forge on Vulcan

"The Forge" and the following two episodes make reference to a time of savagery in Vulcan history known as the "Time of Awakening". This had been previously mentioned in the original series episodes "Balance of Terror", "All Our Yesterdays", and "The Savage Curtain", as well as The Next Generation episode "Gambit". The story mentioned the Vulcan T'Pau, who had previously appeared in The Original Series episode "Amok Time" presiding over the fight between Kirk and Spock, with the elder T'Pau portrayed by Celia Lovsky. Michael Reilly Burke returns as Koss, having previously appeared in the role in the season-four episode "Home". Robert Foxworth appears as Administrator V'Las, having previously appeared as Admiral Leyton in the Deep Space Nine episodes "Homefront" and "Paradise Lost".

Husband and wife duo Judith and Garfield Reeves-Stevens had previously written a number of Star Trek-related novels and books, including a series of collaborations with William Shatner and the novel Federation. They had also written several nonfiction books on the behind-the-scenes productions of the Star Trek series such as Star Trek: Phase II - The Lost Series and Star Trek: The Next Generation - The Continuing Mission. "The Forge" was their first script together for a Star Trek series, but they had previously written scripts for other shows, including Sir Arthur Conan Doyle's The Lost World and Once a Thief. They joined the Enterprise writing team shortly before working on the story for this episode which formed the first part of a planned "Vulcan arc". The arc was created to address the differences between Vulcans seen in the early seasons of Enterprise and those seen in Star Trek series set in later periods. Executive producer Manny Coto said that during the storyline, "we will begin to see Vulcans approaching what they were in the later eras". In Enterprise, Vulcans were more emotional and deceptive than they had been seen in earlier aired series. The storyline was one of several in the fourth season of Enterprise which Coto sought to connect the series to The Original Series. "The Forge" was director Michael Grossman's second episode of Enterprise, having previously directed the third-season episode "Hatchery". He went on to direct the episode "Affliction" later in season four.

== Reception ==
"The Forge" received a 1.9/3% share among adults between the ages of 18 and 49. This means that it was seen by 1.9% of all households, and 3% of all of those watching television at the time of the broadcast. This resulted in UPN placing last out of the major networks, with NBC leading during the timeslot with a 6.3/11% rating for Dateline. Joan of Arcadia on CBS was close to NBC's numbers with a rating of 6.2/11%. "The Forge" had a decrease from the 2.1/4% share received by the previous two episodes "Cold Station 12" and "The Augments".

IGN gave the episode 3.5 out of 5, and wrote "If Enterprise continues to make these kinds of strides towards becoming a decent series, it might just be worth trying to save". Michelle Erica Green of TrekNation approved of the episode with some reservations. She said that it "beautifully melds together threads from every Star Trek series in a way that's deeply satisfying to this lifelong Trekker." However, she was disappointed at the lack of anything for Hoshi Sato or Travis Mayweather to do, and the obviousness of the use of some green screens in some scenes. Jamahl Epsicokhan of the website Jammer's Reviews described the episode as a "jam-packed story that cares about the history of Star Trek". Epsicokhan gave it a score of 3.5/4, saying that it was "an intriguing outing. It's like a cross between Enterprise, The Original Series, and Deep Space Nine, all at once." When later summarizing the fourth season, Epsicokhan described "The Forge" as "easily Enterprise's best episode of the season".

== Home media release ==
The first home media release of "The Forge" was in the season-four DVD box set of Enterprise, originally released in the United States on November 1, 2005. The Blu-ray edition was released on April 1, 2014.
