= Dawn (Star Trek: Enterprise) =

- Star Trek: Enterprise episode
- Episode no.: Season 2 Episode 13
- Directed by: Roxann Dawson
- Written by: John Shiban
- Production code: 213
- Original air date: January 8, 2003

Guest appearances
- Gregg Henry - Zho'Kaan; Brad Greenquist - Captain Khata'n Zshaar

Episode chronology
← Previous "The Catwalk"	Next → "Stigma"
- Star Trek: Enterprise season 2

"Dawn" is the thirty-ninth episode (production #213) of the television series Star Trek: Enterprise, the thirteenth of the second season. The episode aired on UPN on January 8, 2003. Set in the 2100s of the Star Trek universe, the starship Enterprise has set out to explore the galaxy.

Commander Trip Tucker's shuttle pod is fired upon by an Arkonian ship and is stranded on a desert moon with his attacker. As dawn comes on the moon, the temperature increases beyond what the characters can survive. Meanwhile, in orbit, Captain Archer of the Enterprise tries to deal with the Arkonions.

== Plot ==
Commander Tucker is off-ship testing the new autopilot technology on one of Enterprise's shuttle pods. Without warning, his craft is approached and fired upon by an Arkonian ship. With the main systems damaged and central power lost, he is forced to crash-land on one of the system's many moons. On the moon, Tucker has survived the crash and tries to repair the communications systems. He realizes that he is not alone, and is ambushed by the Arkonian pilot, who has also crashed on the moon. After taking each other prisoner in turn, a truce of sorts occurs as they both realize that surviving is their main goal.

Meanwhile, having lost contact with the shuttle, Enterprise commences a search of the area. They are soon intercepted by a large ship belonging to the Arkonians, who claim the region as their own. They are territorial and aggressive, and have their own strained history with the Vulcans. While they demand that Enterprise immediately set course out of their system, their captain is reluctantly persuaded by Captain Archer to agree to a combined search of the sixty-two moons.

Using the surviving technology from both shuttles, Tucker manages to repair the transmitter, and to contact Enterprise. To complicate matters, the sun is slowly rising, and the temperature on the moon is becoming lethally hot. Moreover, since the moon's atmosphere interferes with the shuttle pods' power systems, Enterprise will have to beam the survivors up. The Arkonian, Zho'Kaan, is in too much physiological distress to survive transport, and Tucker refuses to abandon him. Archer then convinces the Arkonians to launch a shuttle modified to function in the moon's atmosphere. Later, with the crew back on board, Zho'Kaan tells Tucker that he is grateful that he failed to shoot down Tucker's pod. Sub-Commander T'Pol concedes that the rescue has allowed for friendlier and more productive relations with the Arkonians in one day than the Vulcans managed in over a hundred years.

== Production ==
This was the third episode directed by Roxann Dawson. She praised guest star Gregg Henry and felt the antagonistic relationship between his character and Connor Trinneer worked beautifully. She found Tucker to be one of the most interesting characters on the show, because he is so accessible and his reactions feel real. The episode was written by John Shiban who had come to Enterprise from The X-Files and earlier in season 2 wrote the episode "Minefield" also directed by Dawson. Producer Rick Berman described the episode as being like Enemy Mine and that the episode would have "a lot of action and suspense."

Guest star Brad Greenquist (the Arkonian captain) previously appeared in the Star Trek: Voyager episode "Warlord" and in the Deep Space Nine episode "Who Mourns for Morn?". Gregg Henry (the Arkonian pilot Zho'Kaan) appeared in Star Trek: Insurrection as one of the Son'a.

== Reception ==
"Dawn" first aired on UPN January 8, 2003. It had a Nielsen ratings share of 2.5/4. It had a total average audience of 3.99 million viewers.

The plot has been compared unfavorably to the classic The Next Generation episode "Darmok", in that two strangers from alien races must transcend a communication barrier in order to survive, but that "Dawn" is more derivative, simple, and lacks "challenge" or "vision". Bureau 42 outright accuses John Shiban of plagiarism of the film Enemy Mine. Michelle Erica Green of TrekNation found the episode derivative, and was disappointed that the B-plot wasn't more interesting to compensate, and that the episode did not take any real risks. The Digital Fix compared "Dawn" to the episode "Darmok", and said it was not terrible but for watchers of The Next Generation, this and some other stories could seem familiar. In his 2022 rewatch, Keith DeCandido of Tor.com gave it 5 out of 10. He notes the similarities to Hell in the Pacific and Enemy Mine and several Star Trek episodes with similar themes calling this the least of them with "nothing particularly compelling about it".

== Releases ==
"Dawn" was released as part of the season two DVD box set, released in the United States on July 26, 2005. A release on Blu-ray Disc for season two occurred on August 20, 2013.

== See also ==
- Hell in the Pacific (1968) film
- Enemy Mine (1985) film
- "Darmok" episode of Star Trek: The Next Generation
