= Kir'Shara =

- Star Trek: Enterprise episode
- Episode no.: Season 4 Episode 9
- Directed by: David Livingston
- Written by: Michael Sussman
- Production code: 409
- Original air date: December 3, 2004

Guest appearances
- Robert Foxworth – Administrator V'Las; Jeffrey Combs – Commander Shran; John Rubinstein – Minister Kuvak; Gary Graham – Ambassador Soval; Michael Reilly Burke – Koss; Kara Zediker – T'Pau; Todd Stashwick – Talok; Jack Donner – Vulcan Priest

Episode chronology
← Previous "Awakening"	Next → "Daedalus"
- Star Trek: Enterprise season 4

"Kir'Shara" is the ninth episode of the fourth season of the American science fiction television series Star Trek: Enterprise. It was writer Michael Sussman's third episode of the season, while it was director David Livingston's second. The episode was the third in a three-part story arc, following on from the episodes "The Forge" and "Awakening". The title "Kir'Shara" refers to a Vulcan religious relic, and the three part Vulcan story arc explored themes relating to the Protestant Reformation resulting in comparisons to books such as The Da Vinci Code and The Celestine Prophecy, while the Kir'Shara itself was compared to the Nag Hammadi library.

Set in the 22nd century, the series follows the adventures of the first Starfleet starship Enterprise, registration NX-01. In this episode, Enterprise attempts to avert a war, and is caught in a crossfire between Vulcan and Andorian starships. Meanwhile. Captain Archer, Commander T'Pol and T'Pau aim to take the Kir'Shara to the Vulcan capital, and use it to reveal Administrator V'Las' plot to the rest of the Vulcan High Command.

In addition to the guest stars returning from the previous arc episodes, or the episode "Home", Jeffrey Combs returned as Shran. The episode was shot across seven days using mostly standing sets, with only an Andorian brig built specifically for this episode. "Kir'Shara" also saw the return of the Vulcan lirpa, a weapon which had been first introduced in the Star Trek: The Original Series episode "Amok Time". The episode originally aired on December 3, 2004, on UPN. It received a Nielsen rating of 2.1/4 percent, which equalled the highest ratings seen during the fourth season. It was warmly received by critics who praised Combs' performance and noted that this episode was an indication of the improving quality of the series. However, there was mixed opinion regarding the ending of the episode.

== Plot ==
Enterprise heads to Andoria after Ambassador Soval informs them that the Vulcans believe they have been developing Xindi weapon technology. Soval guides Enterprise to a nebula where the Andorian fleet is hiding. Commander Shran is dubious, and abducts and tortures Soval. After believing him, Enterprise joins a fleet of six Andorian ships to intercept the Vulcans. Commander Tucker attempts to buy time by ordering Enterprise directly between the two fleets — this works for a while until Administrator V'Las orders them to be targeted too.

Meanwhile, at The Forge, Captain Archer, Commander T'Pol and T'Pau, having found the sacred Kir'Shara (Note: The Kir'Shara is a religious relic in the shape of a tetrahedron, or triangular pyramid, approximately three times as tall as it is wide at its base. It has ancient Vulcan writing carved on its three sides.) (which the Syrrannites believe will usher a Vulcan enlightenment), endeavor to take it to the capital. En route, T'Pol and T'Pau discuss the taboo of mind-melds, and T'Pau offers to mind-meld with T'Pol. She states the meld is safe when performed by those trained in the art, and that Pa'nar Syndrome is merely the by-product of an improperly conducted meld. The trio are then attacked by Major Talok and Vulcan commandos, and T'Pol is captured while the others escape. She tells her captors that they are headed to Mount Seleya in order to mislead them from their true destination.

She is then taken to the capital. Archer and T'Pau also arrive after T'Pol's husband, Koss, provides transporter security codes. They present the Kir'Shara to the High Command and reveal that the embassy bombing was merely a pretext to weaken the pacifist Syrrannites prior to the Andorian strike. Visibly angered, V'Las lunges for the Kir'Shara, but is stunned by High Minister Kuvak, who orders the fleet to stand down. Enterprise returns to Vulcan, and Koss visits to release T'Pol from their marriage. Meanwhile, the Vulcan High Command is dissolved, granting Earth greater autonomy, and the katra of Surak is transferred to a Vulcan high priest. V'Las, relieved of his post, meets secretly with Talok, revealed to be a Romulan agent, who states that the reunification of their worlds is only a matter of time.

== Production ==
Like "Home", "Kir'Shara" was written by Michael Sussman and was his third script during the fourth season. David Livingston directed the episode, which was his second episode of the season having previously directed "Borderland". Most of the guest stars had appeared in the previous episode "Awakening", including Robert Foxworth as Administrator V'Las, Kara Zediker as T'Pau and John Rubinstein as Kuvak. In addition, Michael Reilly Burke resumes his role as Koss for the third time, having appeared in the role both in "Home" and "The Forge". Also appearing, having appeared in "Home", was Jack Donner as a Vulcan priest. Donner appeared in The Original Series episode "The Enterprise Incident" as the Romulan Sub-Commander Tal. "Kir'Shara" also saw the return of Jeffrey Combs as the Andorian Commander Shran for the sixth time as well as Gary Graham as Ambassador Soval, who has appeared as a recurring character in Enterprise since the pilot episode "Broken Bow". Todd Stashwick, later known for his role as Captain Shaw in the third season of Star Trek: Picard, plays Talok.

Filming began on October 4, 2004, and continued until October 12. Despite the desert locations, all filming took place on soundstages. These represented a variety of places throughout the Vulcan desert-like Forge. The remaining sets used were either standing sets, or those which had been constructed for the previous two episodes. The exceptions to that were two sets to represent scenes on board Commander Shran's Andorian vessel. The Andorian bridge set, which had been used previously in the series, had a single wall brought out of storage in order to appear as a backdrop for Shran when he appears on the Enterprise viewscreen. The Andorian brig was built specifically for this episode for scenes with Shran and Soval.

Re-appearing in "Kir'Shara" were the traditional Vulcan weapon, the lirpa, which was first introduced in The Original Series episode "Amok Time". The lirpa is a long shaft with a crescent blade on one end and a spiked cudgel on the other. Brand new props were built for this episode, modifying the original design by making them more lightweight. They were wielded in "Kir'Shara" by Vulcan commandos, who were all played by stunt actors in non-speaking roles. Additional stunt doubles were required for Archer, T'Pol, T'Pau and Talok while two puppeteers were needed for the Andorian antennae seen on screen.

== Themes ==
"Kir'Shara" followed up the events of the previous two episodes in the story arc as well some of the elements seen earlier in the season in the episode "Home". "The Forge" sees Captain Jonathan Archer (Scott Bakula) and T'Pol (Jolene Blalock) travel into the Vulcan desert known as the Forge in order to find a renegade faction of Vulcans, known as the Syrrannites. During the journey, Archer has the katra of Surak transferred into him. In "Awakening", the duo meet the Syrrannites and find out they are peaceful. After Enterprise leaves orbit, the Vulcans start bombarding the caves where the Syrrannites are located, killing T'Pol's mother, T'Les (Joanna Cassidy).

Speaking about "Awakening", show runner Manny Coto had previously said that he envisaged the story arc to be about a Vulcan reformation as a metaphor to the real-world 16th century Protestant Reformation with T'Pau playing the role of Martin Luther. This view was supported by the 2010 book Star Trek As Myth, which saw the original Vulcan religion prior to the Reformation arc seen from "The Forge" onwards as equating to the Catholic Church while the Syrannites were the Protestants. In doing so, Administrator V'Las is therefore linked to the Antichrist in much the same way that the Protestant Reformation saw the Pope as the Antichrist. In this role, the Romulans in the story take the place of the subversive devils to form an unholy alliance.

It was also suggested that the Kir'Shara itself was similar in context to the Nag Hammadi library, which was a collection of thirteen codices found in Nag Hammadi, Egypt, in 1945 that date back to between the 2nd to 5th centuries. Unlike those codices, the Vulcan High Council attempts to suppress the revelation of the Kir'Shara in a similar manner to the Catholic Church's suppression seen in other fictional works such as Dan Brown's The Da Vinci Code or James Redfield's The Celestine Prophecy.

== Reception ==
"Kir'Shara" was first aired in the United States on UPN on December 3, 2004. The broadcast saw the episode come in fourth place during the timeslot, with a Nielsen rating of 2.1/4 percent. This means that it was seen by 2.1 percent of all households, and 4 percent of all those watching television at the time of broadcast. It gained higher ratings than The WB, who aired What I Like About You and Grounded for Life. The ratings equalled the highest ratings of the season so far, which were previously achieved by "Borderland", "Cold Station 12" and "The Augments".

TV Guide listed "Kir'Shara" on its Hot List for the day. IGN gave the episode 4.5 out of 5 and said that the show "finally grows up and becomes a Star Trek series this week". It described "Kir'Shara" as "far from a perfectly executed Trek story but they get enough right to make it a lot easier to overlook the few things they miss." It said that there had been an overall improvement in the fourth season, and that "this could become some of the best Star Trek ever made".

Herc, in his review for Ain't It Cool News, praised the reliability of Jeffrey Combs as Shran, but thought that there were no major surprises. Herc did say that the biggest shock was the revelation that the Romulans were behind the bombing of the Human Embassy. He gave it a rating of three out of five.

Michelle Erica Green reviewed the episode for TrekNation, calling it an "absolutely gripping episode" except for the "ludicrousness of the ending". She made the admission about the ending that, "I suppose the Romulans had to show up at some point, I guess Vulcan is as good a place as any." She thought that the torture scenes were "pointless", but was pleased with the characterization seen in Archer, T'Pol and Tucker.

Jamahl Epsicokhan at his website Jammer's Reviews rated "Kir'Shara" of three out of four, noting it was "not perfect, but good" with an "intriguing" ending. Epsicokhan praised Jeffrey Combs as Shran, and thought that the torture scenes were potent but that the ending was rushed.

In Matthew Kappell's 2010 book Star Trek as Myth: Essays on Symbol and Archetype at the Final Frontier, he said that he felt that the revelation that the previous Vulcan administration was working with the Romulans all along "suddenly makes sense of years of previously incomprehensible Vulcan policy" and linked to The Next Generation episode "Unification".

Screen Rant praised casting actress Kara Zediker as the Vulcan character T'Pau. James Whitbrook of Io9 highlighted this episode as a "must watch" episode of the series. The Digital Fix said this was the best episode of the fourth season, calling it a "well-paced, satisfying resolution" to the Vulcan storyline in the series. They felt the episode successfully capitalizes on the story elements established the previous episode "The Forge".

== Home media release ==
The first home media release of "Kir'Shara" was in the season four DVD box set of Enterprise, originally released in the United States on November 1, 2005. The Blu-ray edition was released on April 1, 2014.
