= The Catwalk =

- Star Trek: Enterprise episode
- Episode no.: Season 2 Episode 12
- Directed by: Mike Vejar
- Written by: Mike Sussman; Phyllis Strong
- Production code: 212
- Original air date: December 18, 2002

Guest appearances
- Scott Burkholder - Tagrim; Zach Grenier - Renth; Aaron Lustig - Guri; Elizabeth Magness - Female Crewmember; Danny Goldring - Alien Captain; Brian Cousins - Alien Lieutenant; Sean Smith - Alien Crewmember

Episode chronology
← Previous "Precious Cargo"	Next → "Dawn"
- Star Trek: Enterprise season 2

"The Catwalk" (S02, E12) is the thirty-eighth episode (production #212) of the science-fiction television series Star Trek: Enterprise. To survive a radiation storm, the entire crew of the Enterprise is forced to shelter inside one of the starship's warp nacelles. Tensions rise and the motives and strange behaviour of the passengers they took on are questioned.

This episode aired on December 18, 2002 on UPN.

== Plot ==
Enterprise is hailed by a trio of aliens, who warn that a deadly neutronic wavefront, many light years across, is approaching at a speed close to warp 7. Since the ship is capable of only warp 5 and cannot outrun the storm, everyone must shelter in order to survive the storm's radiation. The one place onboard that may be heavily shielded enough for the eight-day ordeal is the catwalk, a maintenance shaft running the length of each nacelle. Commander Tucker must take the main reactor offline, as the temperatures on the catwalk can reach 300 °C (573 K) (572 °F) when online.

After only hours to prepare, the crew evacuates to the catwalk. They entertain themselves playing cards, reading, and watching old films, gathered around a small screen. The storm envelops the ship, and as the days wear on, nerves fray, particularly when the alien guests start up a barbecue near a flammable conduit. Tucker and Archer discover that the injectors have started to come online. Tucker must return to Engineering to shut them down again, and his EV suit will only protect him for 22 minutes. When he reaches Engineering, he discovers that an alien ship has docked and intruders are interfering with the ship's systems. Doctor Phlox deduces that the aliens must be immune to the storm's radiation.

When confronted, the trio confesses that the other aliens are looking for them, explaining they deserted from the Takret Militia when they learned their commanders were capturing other ships and killing all onboard. As T'Pol and Reed work to shut down the warp reactor, Archer hails the alien leader, pretending to be the ship's sole survivor. He demands they leave and threatens to destroy the Enterprise rather than let it be taken, and sends the ship straight for a plasma eddy. As the reactor shuts down, the intruders abandon ship. When the Enterprise clears the storm and the crew return to their quarters, Tucker invites T'Pol to join their movie night every Tuesday. The trio of alien visitors apologize for the trouble they brought and depart.

== Production ==
The episode was written by Mike Sussman and Phyllis Strong who also wrote the episode "Dead Stop". Mike Vejar had directed many episodes of Star Trek, and this was the fourth time he has directed a script by Sussman and Strong.

Filming took eight days, starting Wednesday, October 23, and finishing Friday November 1, 2002. Existing sets were used for the first three days. New sets of the catwalk, built especially for the episode, spanned two soundstages and were named "Catwalk-3", "Catwalk-5", "Catwalk-Command" and "Catwalk-Infirmary". The second block of shooting took place almost entirely on the new sets.

== Reception ==
"The Catwalk" first aired on UPN December 18, 2002. It had a 3.0 rating with a 5 share, and an audience of 4.73 million viewers.

In a 2013 review of the season 2 Blu-ray box-set, The Morton Report felt this was one of the season's standout episodes, and called it a "successful example of the writers combining a 'ship episode' (lo-tech and talky) with a suspenseful, somewhat more action-oriented approach."

In 2014, The A.V. Club noted this episode as one of ten in the series that epitomized what the show was about, with the crew "operating at the very edge of their knowledge and their technology", and praised its fascinating premise. In his 2022 rewatch, Keith DeCandido of Tor.com gave it 7 out of 10.

In 2016, Vox rated it one of the top 25 essential episodes of all Star Trek, and described it as "a fun look at the rough-and-tumble early days of Starfleet."

In 2021, The Digital Fix described it as "entertaining" and "one of the good episodes from season two".

== Home media release ==
The first home media release of "The Catwalk" was as part of the season two DVD box set, released in the United States on July 26, 2005. A release on Blu-ray Disc for season two occurred on August 20, 2013.

Jay Chattaway's music for the episode was released as part of the four audio disc box set Star Trek: Enterprise Collection on December 2, 2014, including the orchestral piece "Taking Back Enterprise / Captain A Captain / Core Is Down" on compact discs.
