= Daedalus (Star Trek: Enterprise) =

- Star Trek: Enterprise episode
- Episode no.: Season 4 Episode 10
- Directed by: David Straiton
- Written by: Ken LaZebnik; Alan Brennert
- Production code: 410
- Original air date: January 14, 2005

Guest appearances
- Bill Cobbs - Doctor Emory Erickson; Leslie Silva - Danica Erickson; Donovan Knowles - Quinn; Noel Manzano - Burrows

Episode chronology
← Previous "Kir'Shara"	Next → "Observer Effect"
- Star Trek: Enterprise season 4

"Daedalus" is the tenth episode of the fourth season of the American science fiction television series Star Trek: Enterprise. Set in the 22nd century, the series follows the adventures of the first Starfleet starship Enterprise, registration NX-01. In this episode, as the crew of Enterprise help Doctor Emory Erickson (Bill Cobbs) conduct experimental transporter tests, a dangerous anomaly is detected on board.

It was the second script written by Alan Brennert and Ken LaZebnik, and was directed by David Straiton - his second of the season. "Daedalus" was a bottle episode which used only the standing sets. Show runner Manny Coto had sought to create an origin story for the transporter with "Daedalus", but was not pleased with either the script or the completed episode. The episode originally aired on January 14, 2005, on UPN. It received a Nielsen rating of 1.9/3 percent. Critical reception was mixed, but the relationship between Doctor Erickson, his daughter Danica (Leslie Silva) and Captain Archer (Scott Bakula) was received positively due to the character development.

== Plot ==
Old family friends of Captain Archer, Doctor Emory Erickson and his daughter Danica, beam aboard Enterprise to test new sub-quantum transporter technology Erickson has developed. Catching up, Danica confides in Archer that her father has not been himself since the loss of her brother, Quinn, some 15 years ago in an early transporter experiment. After they arrive in "the Barrens" — a sub-space node void of starlight for a hundred light years — in order to test Erickson's new work, a strange anomaly is detected on the ship. Crewman Burrows is sent to investigate but is found dead, having been exposed to high levels of delta radiation.

In the meantime, Commander T'Pol takes time to rediscover herself in the light of recent events: the teachings of Surak held in the Kir'Shara; the death of her mother; the annulment of her marriage; her cure from Pa'nar Syndrome; and her relationship with Commander Tucker. Tucker assists Erickson with the test, but is brushed aside when he seeks to learn more about the technology. Following a successful trial-run, which sets a new record for the longest transport ever conducted, Tucker confides in Archer that many of the upgrades and modifications to the ship's power systems were not necessary for the test.

The "photonic ghost" reappears, and T'Pol manages to visually scan it, revealing that it is Erickson's long-lost son. Archer now realizes that his old family friends have misled him, and are simply using the ship to somehow rescue Quinn from the node. Erickson freely admits the deception, and asks Archer to trust and help him. Despite the deception, he agrees, aggressively ordering a reluctant T'Pol and a dissenting Tucker to comply. Finally, Tucker and Erickson manage to recover Quinn, but he suffers severe cellular degeneration in the process and dies soon after. Erickson, aware of the consequences he may now face, is happy to finally bring him home and put him to rest.

== Production ==
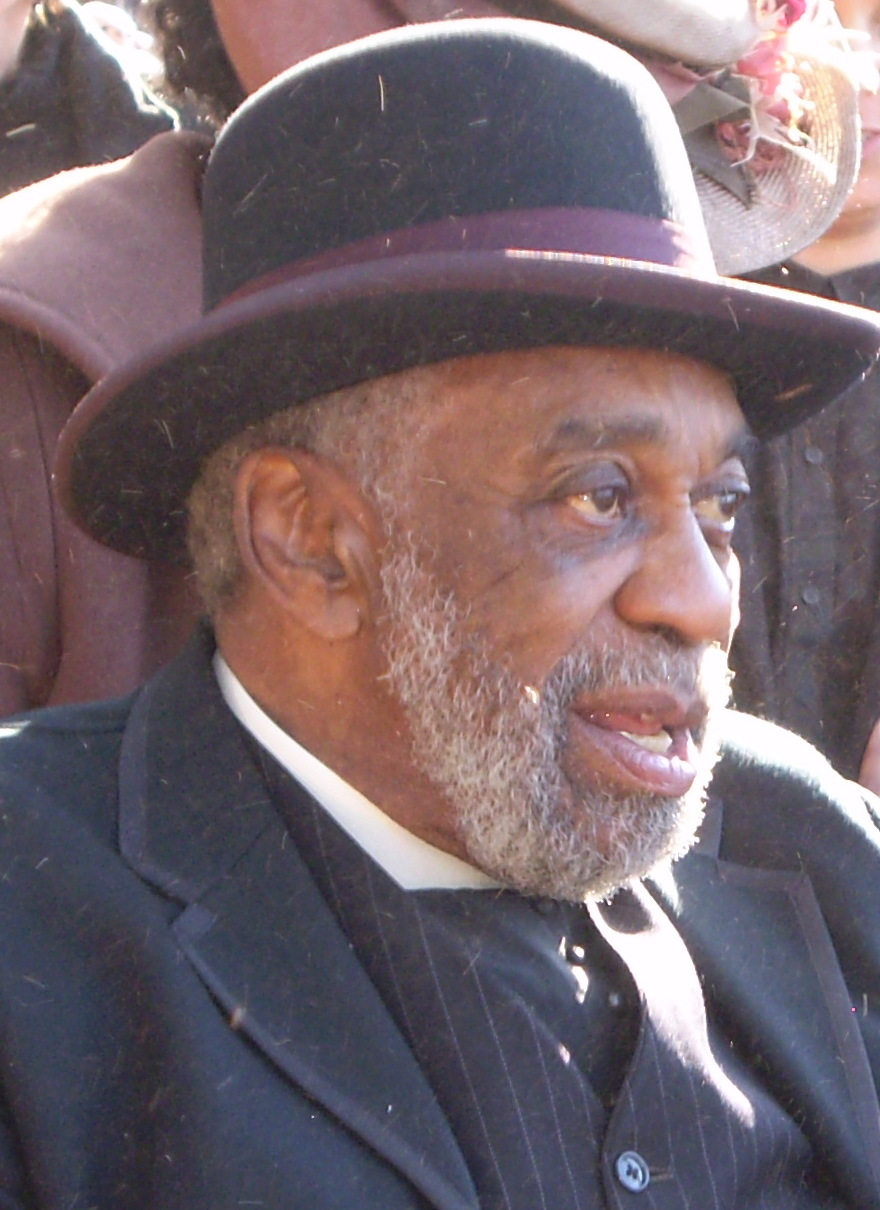
Bill Cobbs played Doctor Emory Erikson in "Daedalus"

The title of the episode was a direct reference to the namesake in Greek mythology, with Erickson taking the role of Daedalus, while his son relates to Icarus. Of the guest stars, Bill Cobbs had previously appeared in other science fiction genre films and television shows such as Demolition Man and The Outer Limits, while Leslie Silva had appeared as Sarah Forbes in Odyssey 5 — a television series created and produced by the Enterprise season four show runner Manny Coto.

Coto explained that he wanted to create an origin episode for the transporter — taking elements of classic Star Trek such as Zefram Cochrane and "The Ultimate Computer" as inspiration. He was not happy with the either the script or the final episode, describing it as "flawed". He felt that the series worked better as multi-episode arcs rather than as stand alone episodes, and with the exception of "Daedalus" he was proud of Season 4.

"Daedalus" was a bottle show, which used only existing standing sets and a reduced number of special effect shots compared to those earlier in the season. The production suffered a power failure on the final day of filming, which caused a two-hour delay to the filming of interviews for features for the DVD release. The episode was directed by David Straiton; "Daedalus" was his second episode of the season following the second-part of "Storm Front". It was also the second credits for two new writers on the show, Ken LaZebnik and Alan Brennert — the former wrote "Borderland" and Brennert was credited as Michael Bryant for the episode "Cold Station 12".

== Reception ==
"Daedalus" was first broadcast on January 14, 2005, on UPN within the United States. The broadcast received Nielsen ratings share of 1.9/3 percent. This means it was seen by 1.9 percent of all households, and three percent of all those watching television at the time of broadcast. It had an average of three million viewers. The episode received lower ratings than The WB, which aired episodes of What I Like About You and Grounded for Life, and UPN came last of all the major networks.

Michelle Erica Green while writing for TrekNation, felt that "Daedalus" was a remix of a variety of prior Star Trek episodes across a number of series, including "The Ultimate Computer", "Silicon Avatar" and "Jetrel", amongst others. She felt that the relationship between Archer and Danica worked, as did the subplot with Tucker and T'Pol. Jamahl Epsicokhan of the website Jammer's Reviews described the episode as "an overall failed episode", and compared it to the Star Trek: Deep Space Nine episode "The Visitor" - an episode he described as "infinitely better" than "Daedalus". He felt that the final arc of the episode was obvious from the start, but liked how the relationship worked between Archer, Erickson and Danica because of the character development. He gave the episode two out of four stars. IGN gave the episode four out of five, and said it was an example of "how Star Trek can still break new ground after six series and over three decades."

== Home media release ==
The first home media release of "Daedalus" was as part of the season four DVD box set of Enterprise, originally released in the United States on November 1, 2005. The Blu-ray release of the fourth season of Enterprise was on April 1, 2014.
