= Zediker =

Zediker may refer to:

- Zediker, California
- Zediker, Pennsylvania
- Kara Zediker, American actress
