= Stigma (Star Trek: Enterprise) =

- Star Trek: Enterprise episode
- Episode no.: Season 2 Episode 14
- Directed by: David Livingston
- Written by: Rick Berman; Brannon Braga
- Production code: 214
- Original air date: February 5, 2003

Guest appearances
- Melinda Page Hamilton - Feezal; Michael Ensign - Doctor Oratt; Bob Morrisey - Doctor Strom; Jeffrey Hayenga - Doctor Yuris; Lee Spencer - Vulcan Doctor

Episode chronology
| ← Previous "Dawn" | Next → "Cease Fire" |
- Star Trek: Enterprise season 2

"Stigma" is the fortieth episode (production #214) of the television series Star Trek: Enterprise, the fourteenth of the second season. The episode aired on UPN on February 5, 2003. This science fiction episode has a story about a spacecraft crew in the 22nd century, dealing with an alien disease, and also acts as a morality play via an analogy about sexually transmitted diseases and oppressed minorities within society.

In the episode, it is revealed that Sub-commander T'Pol has a degenerative disease, pa'nar syndrome, contracted from her mind meld in "Fusion". She must face being ostracized by Vulcan society and losing her position on Enterprise.

== Plot ==
Doctor Phlox tells Sub−Commander T'Pol that his treatment of her potentially fatal disease, pa'nar syndrome, is losing effectiveness, so he would like to make confidential inquiries with Vulcan doctors attending an interspecies medical exchange on the planet Enterprise is now orbiting. T'Pol resists, but Phlox chooses to go anyway. Before he does, his second wife, Feezal, arrives to help install a new microscope, and she soon begins making amorous advances on Commander Tucker. A confused Tucker cannot quite wrap his mind around polygamy, which, in Denobulan culture, is quite a normal practice.

On the planet, Phlox's inquiries with the Vulcans yield little information. When the Vulcans request to visit and interview Phlox and T'Pol, it is clear that the subterfuge had failed, since the Vulcans trick T'Pol into providing a medical sample, which confirms their suspicions. Pa'nar syndrome is only transmitted via mind-meld, a practice which is considered taboo on the Vulcan homeworld. Captain Archer is upset to learn about T'Pol's condition from the Vulcans. Archer then pays his own visit to the Vulcans - a visit which is no more fruitful than Phlox's first. One of the doctors, Yuris, sets up a secret meeting with T'Pol to give her the information she seeks. He reveals a closely guarded secret: he himself is a mind–melder. T'Pol tells Yuris that the meld which gave her the disease was forced on her. Yuris begs her to tell the others before the Vulcan High Command is informed of her condition, but she declines.

It then comes out that T'Pol could lose her commission since pa'nar is a stigmatized disease. Archer uses a loophole in Vulcan protocol to force a hearing. T'Pol remains silent, but Archer stands by his science officer, all the while resisting the Vulcan doctors. Yuris then reveals his status as a melder, and exposes T'Pol's secret. As a result, he is suspended, but T'Pol is allowed to remain on Enterprise. She continues to stand her ground and states her intent to inform the High Command of recent events, hoping to defend Yuris and encourage others to challenge prejudice.

== Pa'nar syndrome ==
Pa'nar syndrome is a fictional neurological ailment, fatal to Vulcans, and transferred between them via a mind meld. At this time in the Star Trek universe, only a small minority of Vulcans are believed to have the ability to initiate mind melds, and only a fraction of that group suffer from the syndrome. Furthermore, Vulcan society has "more intolerance today than there was 1,000 years ago" (a statement by Dr. Yuris, in this episode) and melding is not accepted by Vulcan society in general. Vulcans suffering from pa'nar syndrome are stigmatized – a situation that will not begin to change until the fourth season story arc culminating in the episode "Kir'Shara".

T'Pol contracted this relatively rare disease from a member of a rebellious Vulcan sect which had cast aside the rule of logic and experimented with mind melds and emotions. The event is seen in "Fusion" where T'Pol, apparently unaware of the risks, willingly participates in a mind meld initiated by Tolaris, but later resists the process. In "Stigma" she discloses that she was forced into it. In the fourth season episode "Awakening", T'Pol learns that the condition was caused by an improperly trained melder and, contrary to the public declarations of the Vulcan High Command, it was actually curable (in T'Pol's case, via a meld provided by future Vulcan elder T'Pau). It's later mentioned in "Daedalus" that other pa'nar victims are coming forward to be cured and the disease is no longer the source of stigma that it once was.

== Production ==
In late 2002, Viacom, the owner of the UPN network on which Enterprise was aired, mandated that all fictional programs on its schedule would, sometime during the 2002–2003 season, produce a special episode addressing the AIDS-HIV pandemic.

Brannon Braga wanted to write an AIDS awareness story that was a subtle allegory, and that wasn't too preachy or tried for cheap sympathy. The story was more about the stigma and prejudice surrounding the disease than the disease itself. Braga was also aware of the failed attempt to tell a similar story in Star Trek: The Next Generation, the script "Blood and Fire" by David Gerrold that never made it out of development and into production. Rick Berman thought the episode was in keeping with the tradition of Star Trek, tackling the premise of AIDS through metaphors, he said "We dealt with an alien situation, something that would turn the whole idea, the whole initiative, on its ear to be looked at in a different way."

The plastic Vulcan posters seen in the Vulcan Medical Facility, which featured a Vulcan script and medical diagram, were designed by Timothy Earls. The props were also used in the episode "Impulse" and later went to auction.

== Reception ==
"Stigma" first aired on February 5, 2003. It opened with a tribute to the crew of the Space Shuttle Columbia. According to Nielsen Media Research it was rated 2.9/4. The episode was watched by 4.4 million viewers.

Entertainment Weekly gave the episode a B+, calling it "a thoughtful examination of both pride and prejudice" although they found the B story involving Dr. Phlox's wife incongruous. G.J. Donnelly of TV Guide was critical of the script, and the subplot, but praised Blalock's performance: "Blalock lends T'Pol a dignified vulnerability worthy of the subject matter. Unfortunately, the resolution is predictable, and the tone throughout is a bit too politically correct." John Ruch of the Boston Herald felt that the episode's social commentary was too timid and that it failed to fully address sexuality-based discrimination. Others responded positively to the parallels between the episode and the intolerance in human society.

The Digital Fix said this T'Pol centric episode was a morality play about AIDS, but that it "feels a decade too late in its approach" and although the idea was an interesting concept, it "is never explored outside the episode and the whole story feels a little heavy handed in its approach". Den of Geek in a review of important show characters, recommended this episode as important for understanding the character of Doctor Phlox.

== See also ==
- Sexuality in Star Trek
- "The Naked Time" (Original Series episode with disease transmission)
- "The Disease" (Voyager episode with alien STI)
