= Breaking the Ice (Star Trek: Enterprise) =

- Star Trek: Enterprise episode
- Episode no.: Season 1 Episode 8
- Directed by: Terry Windell
- Written by: Maria Jacquemetton; Andre Jacquemetton
- Production code: 108
- Original air date: November 7, 2001

Guest appearance
- William Utay - Captain Vanik

Episode chronology
← Previous "The Andorian Incident"	Next → "Civilization"
- Star Trek: Enterprise season 1

"Breaking the Ice" is the eighth episode (production #108) of the television series Star Trek: Enterprise, and was written by Maria Jacquemetton and Andre Jacquemetton. Terry Windell served as director for the episode. The episode aired on UPN on November 7, 2001. It was nominated for the 2002 Emmy Award for visual effects.

Enterprise encounters a comet; Lieutenant Reed and Ensign Mayweather stop to mine some Eisilium. To their surprise, the Vulcan ship Ti'Mur stops by to observe the Enterprise. Meanwhile, when Commander Tucker unexpectedly becomes the only crewman to learn that Sub-Commander T'Pol has to make a decision between staying aboard Enterprise or return to Vulcan and her impending marriage, she asks his advice; this starts a steadily deepening personal bond between the pair over the remainder of the series.

== Plot ==
Enterprise is investigating a comet, and Sub-Commander T'Pol learns that the comet contains eisilium, a rare mineral which Vulcan chemists have not previously studied in detail. An away team consisting of Lieutenant Reed and Ensign Mayweather is sent to collect samples. Meanwhile, a Vulcan starship, Ti'Mur, under Captain Vanik suddenly appears and, after Captain Archer suggests parties from each ship study the comet, Captain Vanik stated his members would just prefer to "observe." Captain Archer is not happy about Vulcans looking over his shoulder but, in the interest of cooperation, he agrees.

The Vulcans then send an encrypted message to T'Pol, which Commander Tucker intercepts, and Archer orders Ensign Sato to decrypt. Tucker is the only one to actually read it, and learns that it is not a message about Enterprise, but learns that it regards her arranged marriage – a personal item that no one else on Enterprise is aware of. Tucker apologizes to T'Pol for having read her message. She asks him to keep the contents of the letter confidential. Later, she confesses to Doctor Phlox that she has been having trouble sleeping, and he suggests that it might help if she confide in someone. She decides to consult Tucker, who does not share her views on Vulcan culture and customs, or even that she must leave – pointing out that her seeking advice shows that she is open to choice over tradition. Eventually, she decides to forgo her Vulcan traditions and fulfill her duties aboard Enterprise.

Archer decides to "break the ice" between their races and invites Captain Vanik for dinner aboard Enterprise. It is not successful, as the Vulcan is unresponsive and dismissive regarding human behavior. Archer concludes the meal by accusing the Vulcan of spying on Enterprise and then asks him to leave. Afterwards, Archer notes that an explosion on the surface of the comet has altered the comet's rotational axis. When the sun rises, Mayweather and Reed begin to have difficulties as the ice begins to crack. They attempt to use the shuttlepod to leave, but it falls into a chasm. Archer eventually swallows his pride and negative feelings toward Vulcans by allowing Vanik to help rescue the shuttlepod.

== Production ==
The episode title comes from Shakespeare's The Taming of the Shrew. A revised version of the script was submitted two days after the final draft, on 31 August 2001. Previously the script referred to the Vulcan ship as being of the "Surak class", the revised final draft categorised the type of ship as "Suurok class". The ship was designed by Doug Drexler and inspired by an unrealized ring ship design from Matt Jefferies who designed the ships in the original series. This is the first episode of Star Trek: Enterprise which did not have Rick Berman or Brannon Braga writing the episode or its story, according to the credits of this installment and the previous episodes in the series. Braga once referred to the idea of depicting people walking on a comet as an ambitious challenge that came about as a result of him continually trying to push the limits of what the series' creative staff could do. This was the first episode written by husband and wife writing team Maria Jacquemetton and Andre Jacquemetton, who would go on to win multiple Emmy Awards for their work on the series Mad Men.

Staff writer and science advisor Andre Bormanis worked on the episode, and said they went out of their way to get the scientific details of the comet right and that it really helped the story. Bormanis explained that as the show was set in the near future they wanted to keep it closer to today's science, but that the science must serve the story, and it "is science fiction, so we do feel free to invent new phenomena and theories once in a while." Bormanis concedes that the high gravity on the comet surface was unrealistic but a necessary dramatic license due to simulating low gravity being too much within the cost and time constraints of the show. Writer Chris Black asked the production crew if they could "turn Stage 9 into the surface of a comet?" and was surprised and impressed by the response "Yeah, when do you want it by?" Stage 9 is a location at Paramount Studios, and was also the main stage for the original series and Star Trek: The Next Generation.

Terry Windell previously directed ten episodes of Star Trek: Voyager; this was his first and only episode of Enterprise.

== Reception ==
Breaking the Ice was first aired in the United States on UPN on November 7, 2001. According to Nielsen Media Research, it received a 4.9/8 rating share among adults. This means it had an average of 7.4 million viewers.

Entertainment Weekly said the story was developing in a smart way, and was positive about how they were showing more of Sub-Commander T'Pol's personality. Aint It Cool News gave it 3.5 out of 5, and agreed with the claim from TV Guide that the episode was "smartly scripted". They said this was easily the best episode since the pilot, and were positive about the work of the supporting cast, Jolene Blalock, Connor Trinnear and Linda Park, and also said "the Vulcan ship is pretty cool-looking." Den of Geek said this was an important episode for understanding T'Pol.

Jammer's Reviews gave it 3 out of 4, and was critical of the uninspired story but positive about the character development. Michelle Erica Green of TrekNation gave it a positive review, calling it "the strongest character episode so far" and praising the visual spectacle of the scene showing a sunrise on the comet. Keith DeCandido of Tor.com gave it 5 out of 10, praising the "great individual set pieces" but criticizing the false suspense that T'Pol might actually leave. He criticizes the complete lack of any impact due to the preceding incident at P'Jem which could have added depth and context to Acher's hostility, calling the episode "a blown opportunity".

In 2021, The Digital Fix said this was one of the best episodes in season one, remarking that it has a "charming plot centring [on] Reed and Mayweather".

== Awards ==
The episode was nominated for the 2002 Emmy Award for visual effects, but lost to the pilot episode "Broken Bow".

== Home media ==
This episode was released as part of Enterprise season one, which was released in high definition on Blu-ray disc on March 26, 2013; it has 1080p video and a DTS-HD Master Audio sound track.
