= Home (Star Trek: Enterprise) =

- Star Trek: Enterprise episode
- Episode no.: Season 4 Episode 3
- Directed by: Allan Kroeker
- Written by: Michael Sussman
- Original air date: October 22, 2004

Guest appearances
- Joanna Cassidy – T'Les; Michael Reilly Burke – Koss; Ada Maris – Captain Erika Hernandez; Gary Graham – Ambassador Soval; Vaughn Armstrong – Admiral Forrest; Jim Fitzpatrick – Commander Williams; Jack Donner – Vulcan Priest

Episode chronology
← Previous "Storm Front (Part II)"	Next → "Borderland"
- Star Trek: Enterprise season 4

"Home" is the third episode of the fourth season of the American science fiction television series Star Trek: Enterprise. It first aired on October 22, 2004, on UPN in the United States. It was the second episode of the season directed by Allan Kroeker and the first in season four to be written by Michael Sussman.

Set in the 22nd century, the series follows the adventures of the first Starfleet starship, Enterprise, registration NX-01. This episode brought to a close the Xindi story arc that ran throughout Season 3, with the crew returning to Earth after the successful mission. It features three stories; Captain Jonathan Archer (Scott Bakula) coming to terms with the psychological impact of the previous mission, Doctor Phlox (John Billingsley) finds that the people on Earth have become hostile to aliens, while Commander Charles "Trip" Tucker (Connor Trinneer) and Sub-Commander T'Pol (Jolene Blalock) travel to Vulcan for her arranged marriage.

The episode featured the return of several recurring characters, such as Vaughn Armstrong as Admiral Maxwell Forrest and Gary Graham as Ambassador Soval. Others who made their first of several appearances included Michael Reilly Burke, Ada Maris, Jack Donner and Joanna Cassidy as T'Pol's mother. Filming took seven days, during which time the standing sets used for the interior of Enterprise were redressed to appear as its sister ship, Columbia (NX-02), and location filming was conducted at Malibu Creek State Park. "Home" received a mixed reception from critics, and was watched by 3.16 million viewers on first broadcast.

== Plot ==
Captain Archer and the crew are welcomed back to Earth following the successful Xindi mission. As Enterprise undergoes repairs and refitting, Archer is reunited with a former girlfriend, Captain Erika Hernandez, who has been appointed to Starfleet's second Warp 5 starship, Columbia (NX-02). Archer is debriefed by Admiral Maxwell Forrest and Ambassador Soval. After reacting in anger when Soval asks pointed questions about the Seleya incident, he is ordered by Forrest to take some relaxation leave.

He chooses to go mountain climbing; to his initial annoyance, Hernandez invites herself along. That night, Archer dreams that he is attacked by Reptilians, and Hernandez tries to help him come to terms with his memories and new-found adulation. In return, Archer tries to caution her that space exploration is not as idealistic as she thinks it is. In spite of this, the two manage to rekindle their romance. Returning to Starfleet Command, Archer is able to keep his emotions in check, and ultimately receives an unexpected thanks from Soval who admits that he was wrong about humanity. Elsewhere, Doctor Phlox learns that some humans still hold a grudge over the Xindi attack, xenophobically blaming all aliens, and Phlox's presence in a bar results in a brawl.

Meanwhile, Sub-Commander T'Pol – who has been invited to accept a Starfleet commission – takes the opportunity to travel to Vulcan to visit her mother, T'Les. When Commander Tucker mentions that he does not have a home to go to, T'Pol invites him along. On Vulcan, after a tense homecoming, she learns that her mother has resigned from the Vulcan Science Academy as indirect punishment for T'Pol's actions at the P'Jem sanctuary. One logical way for T'Pol to restore her mother's position is to honor her engagement to Koss, a member of an influential family. Despite Tucker's feelings, who admits to T'Les' observation that he is in love with T'Pol, she consents to marry Koss. Just before the ceremony begins, however, T'Pol quickly kisses Tucker on the cheek.

== Production ==
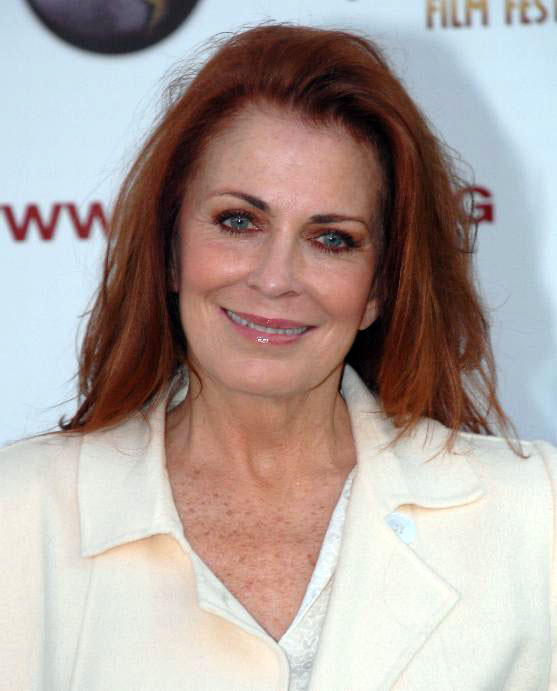
"Home" marked the Star Trek: Enterprise debut of Joanna Cassidy as T'Les.

When predicting what would be in store for season four, Scott Bakula suggested that he would like to see the crew come to terms with the emotional scars of the mission they had against the Xindi in the third season. He wanted several questions to be covered, such as: "How do they come back into society, how do they readjust their behaviors? What has happened to them will always be inside of them, every time they're confronted with new situations." Following the resolution of the mission in "Zero Hour", he wanted the crew to have "a great reception" on their return to Earth. He was pleased with how this was handled in the series, describing "Home" as "a great episode". When actress Jolene Blalock revealed that her character would be getting married in "Home", she joked that she wouldn't need to fight someone – a reference to the Star Trek: The Original Series episode "Amok Time". Dominic Keating summed up the plot of the episode in an interview with Cult Times, saying: "Our heroes find that their world has changed after the Xindi annihilation of Florida at the end of the second year."

The episode featured the return of several recurring characters, such as Admiral Forrest (played by Vaughn Armstrong), who hadn't appeared on the show for more than a year. Gary Graham returned as Soval, after a single appearance in the third season, and Jim Fitzpatrick made a third appearance as Commander Williams. Several actors appeared in the series for the first time, including Jack Donner, although he had appeared as Subcommander Tal in The Original Series episode "The Enterprise Incident". He had been trying to return to the Star Trek franchise for a while, having previously been overlooked for a part on Star Trek: Voyager. He said that his casting was directly linked to showrunner Manny Coto's desire to link Enterprise more to The Original Series; he was also pleased to be asked back to appear later in the season.

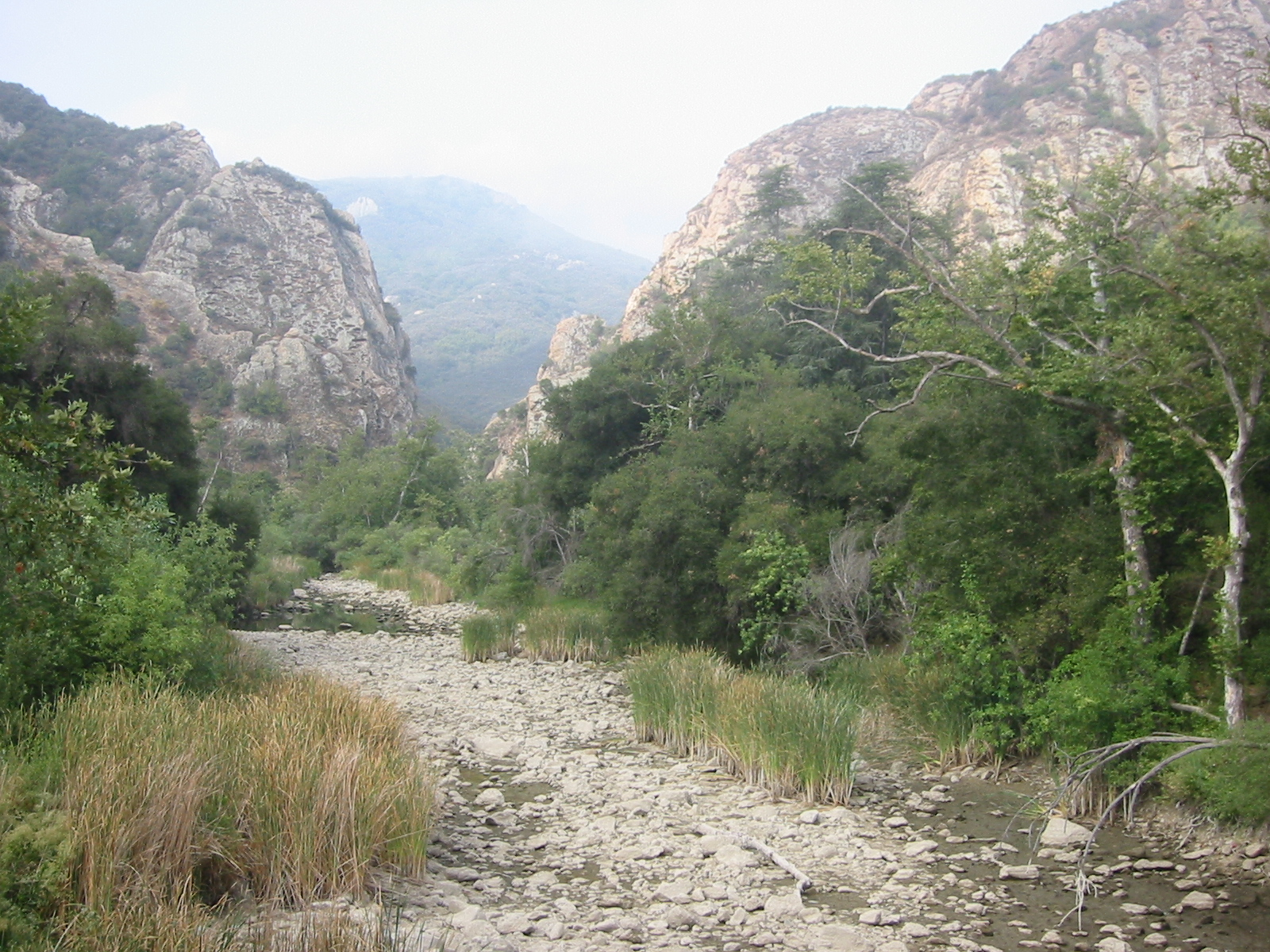
A location shoot took place at Malibu Creek State Park

Also appearing was Michael Reilly Burke as Koss—a character first mentioned in the first season episode "Breaking the Ice". Burke previously appeared as a Borg in Star Trek: The Next Generation and a Cardassian in Star Trek: Deep Space Nine. Also making their first appearances were Ada Maris as Captain Erika Hernandez, and Joanna Cassidy as T'Pol's mother, T'Les. Donner, Burke and Cassidy also appeared in the Vulcan-arc episodes later in the season, while Maris appeared in the two-part Klingon story comprising "Affliction" and "Divergence".

The seven-day filming began on August 4, finishing on August 12. The Enterprise standing sets were re-dressed for the interior scenes on the USS Columbia and a variety of swing sets were used. Outdoor scenes with Archer and Hernandez were filmed at Malibu Creek State Park. One area which had only previously been mentioned (but not seen) in Star Trek was the Fire Plains on Vulcan, in the Star Trek: Voyager episode "Innocence"; for "Home", it was created with computer-generated imagery. Allan Kroeker directed "Home", his second episode of the season, after the first episode "Storm Front" — although he had directed numerous episodes during the first three seasons. The episode's writer, Mike Sussman, wrote five of the previous season's episodes.

== Reception ==
"Home" first premiered on UPN in the United States on October 22, 2004. It was watched by an audience of 3.16 million viewers, an increase over the previous week's episode, the second part of "Storm Front" which was watched by 3.11 million. This was part of an overall increase in viewers during the first six episodes of Enterprise, with each episode being watched by a greater number of viewers than those before it. According to the Nielsen ratings received for "Home", the episode placed fifth in its timeslot, with a rating of 1.7/3 percent. This means that it was seen by 1.7 percent of all households, and three percent of all those watching television at the time of broadcast. It gained higher ratings than The WB, who aired What I Like About You and Grounded for Life.

Prior to broadcast, "Home" was listed as one of the programmes on Entertainment Weekly's "Tonight's Best TV" for October 22. In another preview, IGN described the episode as a "yawner", and described the writers as "lazy" because of the trade off between character development and a general plot – the latter of which they said was absent in this episode. The review praised the additional attention given to Linda Park as Hoshi, saying that she is "possibly the most under-utilized actor on the show and shows the most potential." Overall it said that "the episode hints at promise for the rest of the season but is dull as dishwater on its own."

Ryan Britt writing for Tor.com, included "Home" in a list of six episodes from Enterprise which are comparable to the best of the other Star Trek series. It was described as "the sort of episode that either rewards someone who liked the characters on this show, or could potentially get you to like them if you didn't really know what was going on." Britt's only complaint was that the romance between T'Pol and Tucker wasn't further developed as it brought out the best in Blalock and Trinneer. The A.V. Club gave this an honorable mention, in their list of recommended Enterprise television episodes. Keith DeCandido of Tor.com gave it ten out of ten, and called it "a beautiful examination of the effect that trauma has on people". The Digital Fix said this was a real "kickoff" for season 4 and effectively helped set up the story for the later episode pair "Demons" and "Terra Prime".

The Hollywood Reporter interviewed various cast and production crew of the Star Trek franchise to determine the "100 Greatest Episodes" from across the five series, ranking Home as the 95th best episode of all Star Trek television (over 700 episodes), noting how it gave audiences insights into the characters, when they were not on the ship.

== Home media release ==
The first home media release of "Home" was in the season four DVD box set of Enterprise, originally released in the United States on November 1, 2005. The Blu-ray release of the final season of Enterprise was on April 29, 2014.
