= Kara Zediker =

American actress

- Born: October 8, 1969 (age 57); Kankakee, Illinois
- Education: Columbia College Chicago
- Occupation: Television actress

Kara Zediker (born October 8, 1969) is an American actress born in Kankakee, Illinois. She guest starred on Star Trek: Enterprise as the young T'Pau in the fourth-season episodes "Awakening" and "Kir'Shara". She has also guest-starred on such shows as Charmed, The King of Queens, Becker, Joan of Arcadia and 24.

== Biography ==
Zediker is a graduate of Columbia College Chicago.

She appeared as Elizabeth Nash in the first season of the Fox television series 24, in Rock Star in 2001 as Marci (Rob's girlfriend), and in the role of T'Pau in Star Trek: Enterprise. The character had previously been played by Celia Lovsky in the Star Trek: The Original Series episode "Amok Time", and Zediker portrayed a younger version of that character. One of the reasons why she was cast was because the producers felt that she looked similar to Lovsky.
