= Vulcan (Star Trek) =

Fictional extraterrestrial species in Star Trek

Vulcans
- Star Trek race
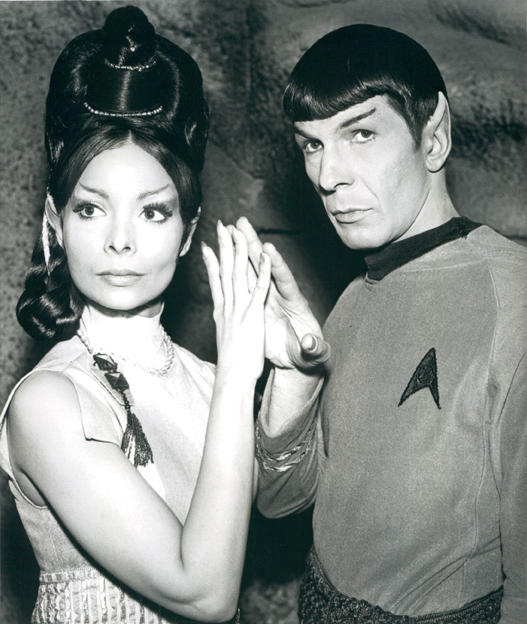
- Leonard Nimoy and Arlene Martel portray male and female Vulcans.
- First appearance: "The Cage"; Star Trek: The Original Series; 1965, unaired
- Created by: Gene Roddenberry
- Genre: Science fiction

In-universe information
- Other name: Vulcanians
- Quadrant: Beta, Alpha
- Home world: Vulcan
- Capital: ShiKahr
- Language: Vulcan, Vuhlkansu, High Vulcan
- Official religion: Vulcan philosophy and tradition
- Affiliation: United Federation of Planets

Vulcans are a fictional extraterrestrial humanoid species in the Star Trek media franchise. They are noted for their strict adherence to logic and reason and suppression of emotion. Known for their pronounced eyebrows and pointed ears, they originate from the fictional planet Vulcan.

In the Star Trek universe, they were the first extraterrestrial species to make contact with humans. Vulcan and Earth are longstanding allies, both being founding members of the United Federation of Planets.

Star Trek's first, and most notable, Vulcan character is Spock, first played by actor Leonard Nimoy in Star Trek: The Original Series (1966–1969). Further Vulcans have appeared across the franchise including main characters Tuvok (Star Trek: Voyager) and T'Pol (Star Trek: Enterprise).

Some aspects of this fictional alien race that have entered popular culture are their pointy ears, the Vulcan salute, the Vulcan nerve pinch, and their adherence to logical thinking and disdain for emotion.

== Development ==
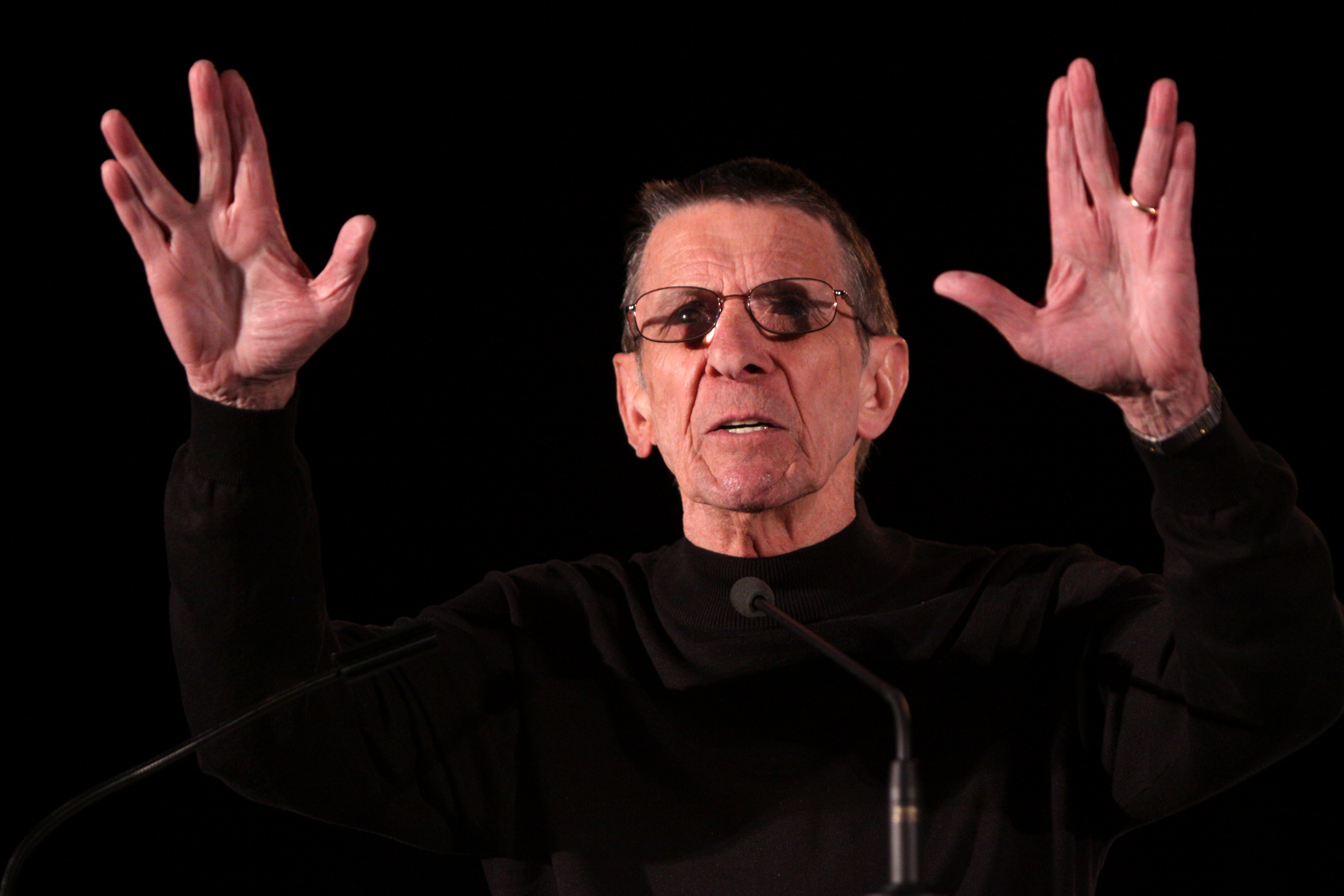
Nimoy demonstrating the Blessing gesture he said was the inspiration for the Vulcan salute

The Vulcan Mister Spock first appeared in the original 1965 Star Trek pilot, "The Cage", shown to studio executives. Show creator Gene Roddenberry revealed in 1964 that he wanted an alien as part of the ship's crew, but knew that budget restraints would limit make-up choices. He chose actor Leonard Nimoy because of his "high Slavic cheekbones and interesting face" and "with those cheekbones some sort of pointed ear might go well." Nimoy later commented that Roddenberry felt the presence of an alien would "establish that we were in the 23rd century and that interplanetary travel was an established fact."

== Biology ==
=== Physical characteristics ===
Vulcans are depicted as similar in appearance to humans, as budget constraints in The Original Series did not allow for elaborate make-up. All Vulcans have arched and upswept eyebrows and pointy ears. White actors portraying Vulcans are given a yellowish hue to their skin. A Vulcan's on-screen blood is green due to copper-based hemocyanin. Vulcans are said to possess an inner eyelid, or nictitating membrane, which protects their vision from bright light, an evolutionary trait developed due to the fictional planet Vulcan being so close to its sun. In addition, their heart is located on the right side of the torso, between the ribs and pelvis; as Dr. McCoy once says about Spock after the Vulcan has been shot through the chest: "Lucky his heart's where his liver should be, or he'd be dead now."

=== Diet ===
Vulcans are vegetarians by choice and were omnivores in ages past. It is a Vulcan custom for guests in the home to prepare meals for their hosts.

Vulcans are said to not drink alcohol, though they are often depicted as doing so.

In an episode of Star Trek: Deep Space Nine, Quark alludes to Vulcans becoming inebriated by ingesting chocolate. This is confirmed in the novelisation of Star Trek IV: The Voyage Home. Kirk buys some candy to get change for the bus. When he gives one to Spock, Spock asks if it contains sucrose. When Kirk asks why, Spock tells him that sucrose has the same effect on Vulcans as alcohol has on humans.

The first draft of an episode of Star Trek: Voyager mentions that Vulcan coffee is poisonous to humans.

=== Mating drive ===
Every seven years, Vulcan males and females experience an overpowering hormone imbalance known as pon farr. Once triggered, a Vulcan must have sexual intercourse with someone or the chemical imbalance may cause insanity, loss of self-control, and death.

Despite popular opinion, TOS writer and story editor, D. C. Fontana, insists that pon farr is not the only time that Vulcans feel sexual desire or engage in sexual activity:

Vulcans mate normally any time they want to. However, every seven years you do the ritual, the ceremony, the whole thing. The biological urge. You must, but any other time is any other emotion—humanoid emotion—when you're in love. When you want to, you know when the urge is there, you do it. This every-seven-years business was taken too literally by too many people who don't stop and understand. We didn't mean it only every seven years. I mean, every seven years would be a little bad, and it would not explain the Vulcans of many different ages that are not seven years apart.

If a mate is not available, there are other ways to relieve the effects of the pon farr, including meditation, violence, "shock", and simulation.

=== Other characteristics ===
Vulcans are typically depicted as stronger, faster, and longer-lived than humans. This is hypothesized to be due to the increased gravity on Vulcan (1.4 g). However, Vulcans are less cold-tolerant than humans. There are instances of them living over 220 years. Having evolved on a fictional desert planet, Vulcans can survive without water for longer periods than humans. Vulcans can also go without sleep for as long as two weeks.

== Psychology ==
=== Emotion ===
Vulcans are known as logical beings who have removed emotions from their daily lives. The Vulcan character, Spock, struggles with this throughout the original series as he is half-human. T'Pol states that paranoia and homicidal rage were common on Vulcan before the adoption of Surak's code of emotional control.

Surak's ideas were that all Vulcans should suppress emotions, for the safety of the species. Before him, Vulcans were dangerously raging, emotional, war-like and religiously fanatical, to the point that it could have threatened the continuation of their society and species. Then, around the 4th century BC, he created a system revolving around these ideas, intended to create a peaceful society. Some Vulcans disagreed, causing a war to break out. The two sides separated, causing the emotional ones to become Romulans and the logical ones to become what is referred to as modern-day Vulcans. Vulcans still possess and experience emotions, but make great efforts to keep them from being expressed or controlling their behavior. They occasionally have mental breakdowns. Only those who follow the discipline of kolinahr have completely purged all emotions from their minds. Spock, in Star Trek: The Motion Picture, attempts to achieve kolinahr, but ultimately fails to do so.

Other Vulcans who did not believe in war but still wanted to embrace emotions made different choices. A group of renegade Vulcans who believed in this was encountered in the Star Trek: Enterprise episode "Fusion", while Spock's half-brother Sybok, seen in the film Star Trek V: The Final Frontier, was also fully emotional. An episode of Enterprise titled "E²" featured an elderly T'Pol in an alternative timeline who had embraced emotion and allowed her half-human son, Lorian, to do likewise.

In the 1st pilot episode, "The Cage", Spock showed much more emotion. For the second pilot, "Where No Man Has Gone Before", Number One – Spock's superior officer, who showed little emotion – was removed, and it was decided that Spock would take on those traits.

Vulcan emotions are seemingly more intense than those of humans. In the TNG episode Sarek, Ambassador Sarek warns Captain Picard that "Vulcan emotions are extremely intense; we have learned to suppress them", and that Picard would be overwhelmed by Sarek's unrestrained emotions due to the effects of Bendii syndrome while the two are linked during a Vulcan mind-meld. Picard does, in fact, have tremendous difficulty controlling himself while experiencing Sarek's emotions during the meld, including the ambassador's suppressed loves and hidden regrets.

=== Telepathy ===
Vulcans are telepaths. Beginning in the original series, the character Spock was able to "mind meld" (see below) by touching another being and to share thoughts. Vulcans have also displayed telepathy at great distance and through walls.

==== Mind melds ====
A mind meld is a technique for sharing thoughts, experiences, memories, and knowledge with another individual, essentially a limited form of telepathy. It usually requires physical contact with a subject, though instances of mind melds without contact have been seen. When first depicted in the TOS episode "Dagger of the Mind", the procedure was said to require several moments of intense concentration and preparation. However, subsequent episodes show contact between minds occurring almost immediately. Although most often seen done with humanoids, mind melds can be performed with members of other species. Spock even once successfully mind melded with a machine and was able to establish telepathic contact with the space probe V'ger, with a silicon-based lifeform, the Horta, and, in another instance, with a humpback whale.

Mind melds can be used both to erase and restore memories; Spock performs each of these on Captain Kirk during TOS's third season. A mind meld was even used to rejoin Spock's katra (see below) with his physical body in Star Trek III: The Search for Spock. Mind melds can also allow more than one mind to experience memories and sensations, and sometimes even interact with the memories. Some species are able to resist mind melds.

The quad-lobed brain structure of Ferengi make them unable to be telepathically read by other species, and with sufficient training and mental discipline, high-level Cardassian military personnel and/or agents of the Obsidian Order are able to resist mind melds used to extract information. For example, when Gul Dukat was captured by the Maquis, he successfully resisted a prolonged mind meld attempt from a female Vulcan Maquis member, much to the latter's frustration.

==== Katra ====
Vulcans are able to implant their "katra" into another person via a mind meld just before death. Sarek explained to Kirk that Spock's katra was "his essence, everything that was not of the body, his katra, his living spirit...everything that he was, everything that he knew". He further explained that this transference was "the Vulcan way, when the body's end is near." Dr Julian Bashir in the DS9 episode "The Passenger" referred to this phenomenon as "synaptic pattern displacement". The Star Trek: Enterprise Season 4 trilogy of episodes ("The Forge", "Awakening", and "Kir'Shara") reveal some of the history of mind-melding and the journey of the katra of Surak to modern times.

Katra can also be used to transfer a Vulcan's healing ability to another to aid in regeneration for serious injury. Sarek transferred some of his katra to Michael Burnham (DIS Season 1, Episode 6, "Lethe") in order to save her life as a child, which connected Michael to Sarek, and she refers to it as a "soul graft".

Katras can be returned to the body. Such was the case with Spock, who, near the end of Star Trek II: The Wrath of Khan, implanted his katra into the mind of Dr. McCoy before sacrificing his life. In Star Trek III: The Search for Spock, a mind meld ritual, the "fal tor pan" ("re-fusion"), removed the katra from McCoy and implanted it into Spock's regenerated body. The ritual was successful, though it carried risks for both.

== Culture ==
=== Language ===
Vulcans have their own language in the Star Trek universe. Several words are heard throughout the various television series starting with the Star Trek: The Original Series episode "Amok Time". Words and dialogue are heard in the feature films Star Trek: The Motion Picture, Star Trek II: The Wrath of Khan, Star Trek III: The Search for Spock and Star Trek V: The Final Frontier.

Linguist Marc Okrand is credited for creating the Vulcan spoken language for Star Trek II: The Wrath of Khan. As in most of the films, the actors filmed their lines in English which was later dubbed with the Vulcan translation.

=== Vulcan salute ===
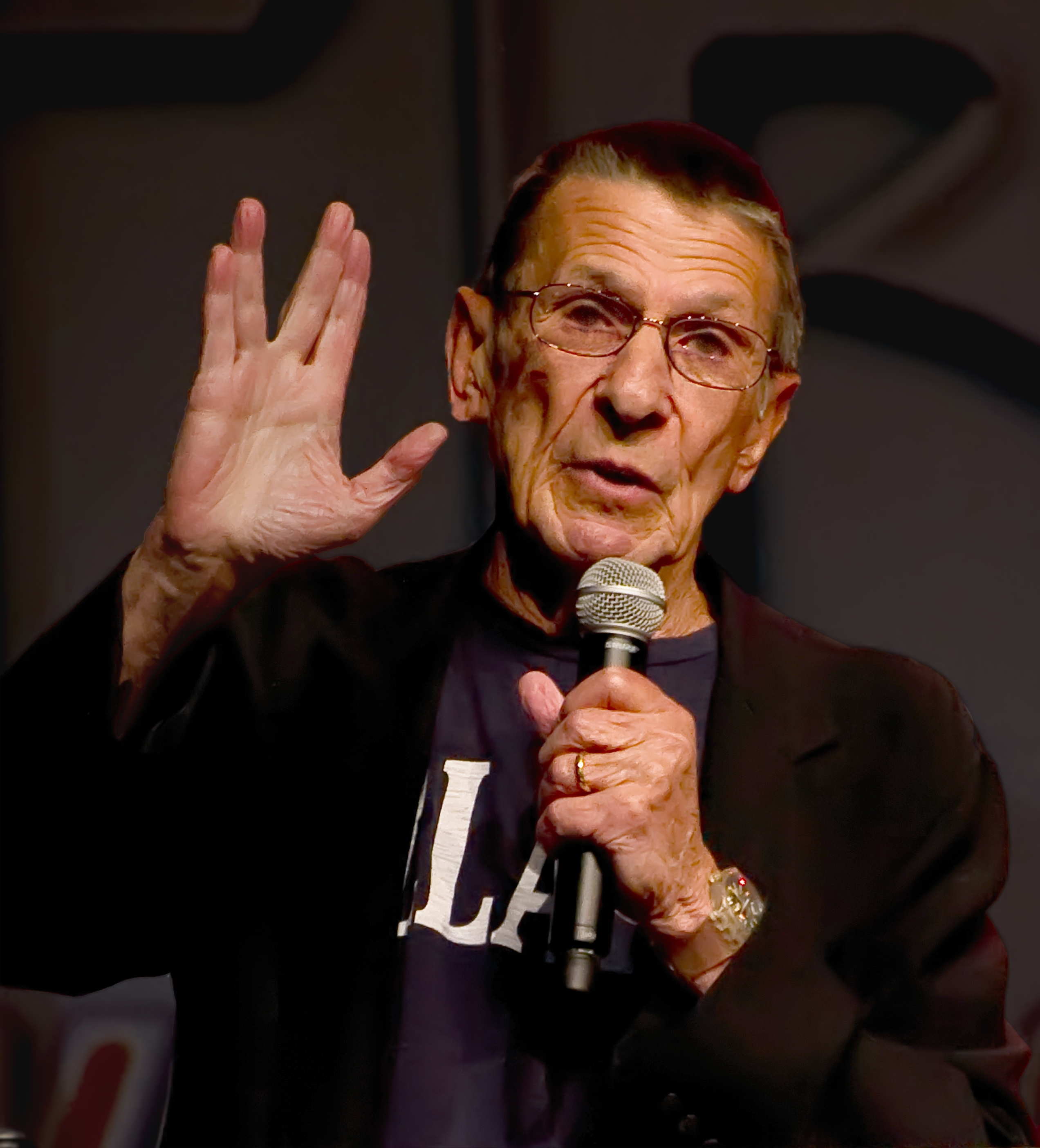
Leonard Nimoy demonstrating the Vulcan salute

The Vulcan salutation is that of the Jewish priestly blessing: a hand gesture consisting of a raised hand with the palm forward and the thumb extended, while the fingers are parted between the middle and ring finger. Typically, the phrase "live long and prosper" is uttered when making the salute, adapting the priestly blessing "may the Lord bless you and keep you." An appropriate reply would be to return the gesture and utter either "live long and prosper", or "peace and long life".

=== Names ===
The treatment of Vulcan names has been erratic throughout Star Trek's production history. Early on, female Vulcans were typically given names beginning with "T" followed by an apostrophe then a "p". The earliest reference to Vulcan names following a set pattern dates back to a May 3, 1966 memo from TOS producer Robert H. Justman to Gene Roddenberry (later reprinted in the book The Making of Star Trek) in which Justman recommended that all Vulcan names begin with "SP" and end with "K", and have exactly five letters. (It is clear from the context of the book, however, that the memo was intended as a joke, as the series of memos ends up discussing the pronunciation of such names as "Spook", "Spilk" and "Spork".)

Only non-canonical sources have provided any Vulcans with family names, which are usually spoken of as defying attempts at both human pronunciation, especially with English-language phonemes, and human typesetting, especially with the characters of the modern Latin alphabet used for the English language. Hence, no canonical source has given any family names to any Vulcan characters, and, indeed, every one of the personal names previously mentioned is officially described as being only Latin-alphabetical and English-phonetic approximations of the real ones. In the TOS episode "This Side of Paradise", Spock is asked if he has another name, to which he replies "You couldn't pronounce it."

=== Marriage ===
Vulcans practice arranged marriage, in which a male and a female are bonded as children, with consummation at a later date. Spock explains that this childhood pairing has no one-for-one human analogue, as it is considered less than a full "marriage", but more than simply a "betrothal". This is why Spock first described T'Pring as his "wife", before later explaining that this was an incorrect approximation. Following adult union, it is customary for the couple to remain on Vulcan for at least one Vulcan year before conducting off-world travel, though it is possible to defer this requirement until a later date, upon negotiation with the male's family. The state of pon farr is not required for marriage to occur.

A Vulcan female can challenge the proposed bonding by calling for "koon-ut-kal-if-fee", meaning "marriage or challenge", in which a challenger for marriage engages the bonded male in a fight to the death. Alternatively, the bonded male has the option of rejecting his intended bride and choosing another. It is acceptable for a male to "release" his mate from marriage (effectively the same as a divorce). It is not established whether females have the same option, and T'Pring stated in "Amok Time" that a koon-ut-kal-if-fee challenge was the only way she could legally divorce Spock.

While most Vulcan marriages are arranged in childhood, adult Vulcans who have no mates may also declare the "koon-ut-so-lik", the ritual Vulcan marriage proposal. As with arranged marriages, the Vulcan being proposed to may accept or challenge the union.

=== Family ===
It is customary for Vulcan children to undertake an initiation ordeal known as the "Kahs-wan" (sometimes spelled Kaswahn), in which they are left to fend for themselves in the desert for a specific period of time. Not all children survive this rite of passage. T'Pol underwent the ritual, while Tuvok experienced a variation known as the "tal'oth". The Kahs-wan was first introduced in the Star Trek: The Animated Series episode "Yesteryear", in which Spock's experience as a child was detailed.

Contrary to the Vulcan image of expressing no emotion, family bonds can be strong and affectionate just as they are for humans. Tuvok expressed his love for his wife on a few occasions (without actually using the term), Sarek openly expressed affection for both his human wives, and a clear bond of love existed between T'Pol and her mother, T'Les. The bond between Spock and his adopted sister, Michael Burnham, is a central theme of the Star Trek: Discovery second season.

=== Fighting and self-defense ===
In the TOS episode "The Savage Curtain", Surak explains to Kirk Vulcan's history of violence and the turn to peace that saved their civilization. He tells Kirk that he will not fight. Spock says that he has fought, and will fight again, but that he, too, is a "Vulcan, bred to peace."

==== Vulcan nerve pinch ====
Vulcans are capable of a technique known as the "Vulcan nerve pinch" or "neck pinch", which targets a location on the neck between the head and the shoulder that renders the victim unconscious. The pinch was first seen in the TOS episode "The Naked Time". The mechanics of the pinch have never been explained. While practiced mainly by Vulcans, it is apparently not exclusive to their race. Jonathan Archer and Jean-Luc Picard both use the technique after becoming involved in Vulcan telepathic rituals (Archer holding the katra of Surak, Picard having undergone a mind-meld with Sarek). Seven of Nine is depicted as capable of using this ability in the episode of Voyager "The Raven". The android Data also displayed this ability in the TNG episode "Unification, Part II," which Spock described as "not bad." In Star Trek: Discovery, Michael Burnham does the nerve pinch on Captain Philippa Georgiou and commits mutiny.

The neck pinch itself (referred to in scripts as "FSNP", or "Famous Spock Neck Pinch") was created by Leonard Nimoy, who objected to a scene in "The Enemy Within", in which a transporter malfunction had divided Kirk between his good and evil selves, that required Spock to render the "evil" Kirk unconscious and subduing him by hitting him over the head with the butt of a phaser. Nimoy was convinced that such overt violence, in addition to being too similar to that found in many crime dramas of the time, was uncharacteristic of the strictly-logical Spock, and suggested the neck pinch as a less-emotional alternative.

=== IDIC ===
A Kol-Ut-Shan pendant symbolizing IDIC

In Star Trek, the IDIC (Infinite Diversity in Infinite Combinations) has become a symbol of Vulcan equality philosophy. It is symbolized by the "Kol-Ut-Shan", a pendant of yellow and white gold with a circle and triangle resting upon each other, and adorned with a white jewel in the center.

The Vulcan IDIC pendant was designed by Gene Roddenberry as a marketing premium to be sold through mail order to Star Trek fans. As early as the end of the first season, fans of the show had begun writing to the studio asking for copies of the scripts, film clip frames, etc., and these were soon sold through Roddenberry's mail order company, Lincoln Enterprises. As evidenced in some of his letters and memos, Roddenberry was fond of circle-and-triangle designs and had wanted to use them as early as the first season's "The Return of the Archons". As reported by Inside Star Trek editor Ruth Berman, "ardent rock hound and amateur lapidary" Roddenberry came up with the Vulcan philosophy after he presented Leonard Nimoy with a unique hand-crafted piece of jewelry, a pendant of a polished yellow gold circle and a florentined white gold triangle with a stone of brilliant white fabulite—an artificial gem "developed by the laser industry and used in space mechanisms for its optical qualities", and thus well-suited as a gift for an actor in a science fiction show. Readers were encouraged to submit their interest in such a product to Lincoln Enterprises mail order firm. It was noted that less expensive materials would keep costs down.

According to William Shatner in Star Trek Memories, IDIC was only worked into the episode "Is There in Truth No Beauty?" as an afterthought. The actors all knew it was a mere advertising toy. Reportedly, Leonard Nimoy was asked to wear it and refused, so it was passed on to Shatner; when he also refused, Nimoy reluctantly agreed to wear it. At the last minute, Roddenberry sent down several pages of new script for the dinner scene, in which Spock was to give a long-winded explanation of the philosophy. The actors refused to film it until Roddenberry cut it down.

In an issue of The Humanist, Majel Barrett claimed that the philosophy of "Infinite Diversity in Infinite Combinations" was based on the teachings of Rabbi Maimonides.

Although its origins are rooted in marketing and sales, the IDIC became a theme writers and set designers have used in most of the Star Trek franchise. Spock wore the symbol during important gatherings and ceremonies as part of his dress uniform. After appearing for the first time in the TOS episode, "Is There in Truth No Beauty?", it appeared in Spock's quarters in Star Trek II: The Wrath of Khan, Star Trek III: The Search for Spock, and Star Trek VI: The Undiscovered Country. In the series Star Trek: Enterprise, T'Pol is given an IDIC pendant from her mother T'Les, she holds an IDIC pendant in "Terra Prime" while she is in mourning for her dying child, and in the episode "The Andorian Incident" the IDIC symbol appears on small playing pieces that are being used to construct a map of the P'Jem catacombs. In the DS9 episode "The Jem'Hadar", Quark mentions selling Vulcan IDIC pins, and in the DS9 episode "Take Me Out to the Holosuite", Captain Solok and his Vulcan team, the Logicians, wear ball caps featuring the IDIC symbol.

== Homeworld ==
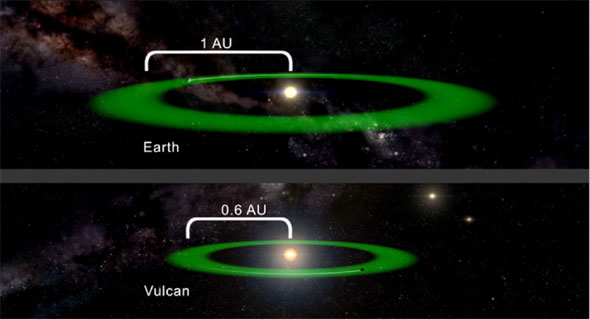
Habitable zone of the Solar System and 40 Eridani A compared, with the homeworld of the Vulcans called Vulcan placed inside of it

The fictional Vulcan homeworld, also named Vulcan, was visited several times in the Star Trek series and feature films. It is first depicted in the TOS episode "Amok Time", Vulcan, a Class M planet, as an arid world with a thinner atmosphere than Earth. Upon beaming down, McCoy states "'Hot as Vulcan.' Now I understand what that phrase means." In the TOS episode "The Man Trap", while Uhura is attempting to make conversation with Spock, he informs her that Vulcan has no moon.

According to Star Trek canon, the planet orbits 40 Eridani A. The authorized Star Trek book Star Trek: Star Charts and Roddenberry himself give this location. In addition, Commander Tucker's statement in the Star Trek: Enterprise episode "Home" that Vulcan is "a little over" 16 light years from Earth supports this location, as 40 Eridani A is 16.39 light-years from our own Solar System. The planet's location is confirmed by a map shown in the Star Trek: Discovery episode "Magic to Make the Sanest Man Go Mad".

The Star Trek: Discovery episode "Unification III" reveals that after the Vulcans reunified with their ancient cousins, the Romulans, the Vulcan homeworld was renamed Ni'Var. Ni'Var had seceded from the Federation (due to the apocalyptic event known as The Burn); in the later episode "All Is Possible", Ni'Var rejoins the Federation.

In the 2009 film Star Trek, an alternate timeline is created in which Vulcan is destroyed by Nero, a Romulan renegade. By the time of Star Trek Into Darkness a Vulcan colony named "New Vulcan" had been established.

== History ==
Vulcans once practiced a form of polytheism; this can be seen in gods of war, peace, and death depicted on the Stone of Gol relic in the TNG episode "Gambit". The DVD commentary for "Amok Time" says that TOS writer D. C. Fontana named the Vulcan god of death "Shariel", a bust of whom is seen in Spock's quarters.

Vulcan civilization is ancient. In "Amok Time", Spock says that the place of "Koon-ut-kal-if-fee" has been held by his family for 2,000 years. In the TOS episode "The Savage Curtain", the image of Surak speaks of a time when Vulcan war nearly destroyed them, before logic was embraced as a way of life.

In 1957, the launch of Sputnik I, Earth's first artificial satellite, was observed by a Vulcan vessel that subsequently crashed on the planet, marooning several crew members for a number of months in Carbon Creek, Pennsylvania; the humans were unaware of the alien nature of their guests.

On April 5, 2063, Vulcans and humans made official first contact near the town of Bozeman, Montana, following the successful test of Earth scientist Zefram Cochrane's first warp-capable starship.

In 2097, the Vulcans annexed the Andorian planetoid Weytahn and renamed it Pan Mokar.

In 2105, the Vulcans and the Andorians agreed to a compromise over Weytahn/Pan Mokar. Still, tensions continued due to the threat of mutual annihilation.

By the 22nd century, the Vulcan High Command is a form of military government that controls both the Vulcan space fleet and most of the planet itself. Most Vulcans, including T'Pol, from Star Trek: Enterprise obey the High Command. It is dissolved in the early fourth season of Star Trek: Enterprise.

In 2151, Sub-Commander T'Pol joined the crew of the Earth Starfleet vessel Enterprise (NX-01), within a couple of weeks setting a Vulcan endurance record for serving aboard a human vessel. In 2154, T'Pol became a commissioned officer with Starfleet.

In the time of Star Trek: Enterprise, Vulcans are seen to be arrogant and cold in their behavior towards humans. Soval, Vulcan's ambassador to Earth, appeared particularly distrustful of humans, and was often at odds with Archer and his crew. Soval later justified this behavior in the fourth season episode "The Forge":

'We don't know what to do about humans. Of all the species we've made contact with, yours is the only one we can't define. You have the arrogance of Andorians, the stubborn pride of Tellarites. One moment you're as driven by your emotions as Klingons, and the next, you confound us by suddenly embracing logic"

Soval also explained that Earth recovered from World War III far more quickly than Vulcan did from its equivalent. (In "The Forge" and its sequel episodes, it is said that Vulcans took almost a thousand years to fully rebuild their society after their last catastrophic war.) This alarmed many Vulcans, who were confused as to how to deal with a rapidly growing and emotional society such as Earth's.

Throughout the period of Star Trek: Enterprise, the High Command's actions were the themes of several episodes. Vulcan starships were sent to spy on the Enterprise and report on the ship's activities. They appeared to participate in open acts of persecution towards other Vulcans, such as isolating and quarantining victims of Pa'nar Syndrome rather than treating them; prejudicial acts against any Vulcan proven to have committed a mind meld; and hunting down and capturing, sometimes killing, members of the underground dissident group, the Syrranites.

In 2154, V'Las, the head of the High Command and undercover agent for the Romulans, bombed the United Earth embassy on Vulcan in an attempt to frame and eliminate all Syrranites while simultaneously attempting an invasion of Andoria. He was foiled by the crew of the Enterprise. During these events, the Kir'Shara, a device containing the original writings of Surak, was discovered by Jonathan Archer. This led to the prompt dissolution of the High Command and a reevaluation of Vulcan traditional values. It also resulted in Vulcan agreeing to stop "looking over Earth's shoulder" in space exploration matters.

It was revealed to viewers that the High Command's illogical and often emotionally based actions were, in reality, the result of covert Romulan influence. The Romulans had secretly made contact with V'Las and attempted to reunify their long-lost peoples. After the invasion of Andoria was foiled, the High Command was disbanded and V'Las was dismissed from his post. Subsequently, the altered political climate on Vulcan caused the undercover Romulan operative Talok to leave Vulcan, apparently ending the infiltration.

After the overthrow of the corrupt Vulcan High Command and the death of Admiral Maxwell Forrest, who sacrificed his life to save Soval from a terrorist attack, the attitudes of Soval, and Vulcan society in general, became more cordial and accepting towards humanity.

On August 12, 2161, Vulcan became one of the founding members of the United Federation of Planets.

By the 32nd century, Ambassador Spock's dream of Vulcan/Romulan reunification has been achieved. Following the destruction of Romulus, the surviving Romulans have returned to their ancestral homeworld, now called Ni'Var.

=== Star Trek (2009) alternate timeline ===
In the alternate timeline of the 2009 film, the planet Vulcan is destroyed in 2258 by the Romulan known as Nero, who had time-traveled from the future. Using his space mining vessel, Narada, Nero created a singularity in Vulcan's planetary core as part of his quest to avenge the destruction of Romulus, which Spock failed to save. The resulting implosion destroyed Vulcan, killing most of its six billion inhabitants. Only around 10,000 managed to escape. At the end of the film, Spock Prime tells the younger Spock a suitable planet has been located to establish a colony for the surviving Vulcans; this world is named "New Vulcan".

== See also ==
- Vulcan, Alberta – a town in Canada that has incorporated Star Trek themes due to its name
- Vulcan (hypothetical planet)
