= T'Pol =

Character in Star Trek

- Star Trek character
- Jolene Blalock as T'Pol
- First appearance: "Broken Bow" (2001)
- Last appearance: "Fissure Quest" (2024)
- Created by: Rick Berman; Brannon Braga
- Portrayed by: Jolene Blalock

In-universe information
- Species: Vulcan
- Affiliation: Vulcan High Command, later Starfleet
- Significant other: Trip Tucker
- Posting: Science officer, Enterprise (NX-01)
- Rank: Sub-Commander, later Commander

T'Pol (/tɪˈpɒl/) is a fictional character in the Star Trek franchise. Portrayed by Jolene Blalock in the series Star Trek: Enterprise, she is a Vulcan who serves as the science officer aboard the starship Enterprise (NX-01). She appeared in all 98 episodes of "Enterprise" and reprised her role in one episode of Star Trek: Lower Decks.

== Concept and creation ==
Series producer Rick Berman said they originally intended that a younger version of T'Pau would be the Vulcan officer serving on the titular starship in Star Trek: Enterprise. Instead, after determining there were legal difficulties in using the original series character, the producers created T'Pol. Brannon Braga said the idea was dropped to avoid having to deal with any legal issues, and that T'Pol was simply easier to pronounce. Marjorie Monaghan, Blalock, and an unnamed actress were the final three considered for the role. By that time, Berman said they had seen hundreds of actresses, and they struggled to find a "beautiful woman who can act and doesn't want to go right into feature films". Casting director Ron Surma had Blalock in mind from the beginning but her agents said she was not interested. Braga thought Blalock was perfectly cast, "We wanted a sexy Vulcan, a Kim Cattrall-type, and we definitely got that".

== Overview ==
T'Pol is the first Vulcan officer to serve a prolonged term on a human vessel. T'Pol served aboard the Enterprise for 10 years (2151–2161). To compare, the previous record was just 10 days. As a sub-commander serving the Vulcan High Command, she was stationed aboard the Enterprise in April 2151, as an observer to Captain Jonathan Archer and his crew, who the High Command insisted, were not ready for interstellar space exploration. After the success of the Enterprise's initial mission led to the vessel being given an extended exploration mandate, T'Pol requested to stay aboard.

T'Pol remained aboard the Enterprise despite several attempts by her superiors to recall her to Vulcan. T'Pol's decision brought considerable scrutiny upon her from her superiors, and increasing support for her from her captain; she ultimately resigned from the High Command and accepted a field commission from Starfleet in 2154, resulting in her being granted the Starfleet rank of Commander.

Originally viewed by her crew mates with resentment and suspicion, T'Pol was forced to earn the trust of fellow officers, with Commander Charles "Trip" Tucker III being a particular focus of friction with her, due to his perception of her being a spy for the Vulcans and their very different personalities.

T'Pol is more emotional than many other Vulcans and has always struggled to control her emotions, something that greatly concerned her mother. Her emotions became even more difficult to control following an exposure to trellium ore, a toxic substance which damaged the part of her brain responsible for emotional control. Nonetheless, T'Pol serves as an icon of Vulcan integrity. Her willingness to question the decisions of her superiors, and her respect for Captain Archer position her at the fulcrum of human/Vulcan relations.

== Biography ==
=== Before Enterprise ===
In Season 3, episode 24 "Zero Hour", while talking with Trip on February 14, 2154, T'Pol states that she "will only be 66 years old" on her next birthday. This places her birth in 2088 or 2089 (as measured on Earth), making her 62 or 63 years old at "Broken Bow". T'Pol was born the only child of T'Les, an instructor at the Vulcan Science Academy, and her (never named) husband. Per Vulcan tradition, T'Pol was bonded with a Vulcan named Koss while they were children and expected to marry as adults ("Breaking the Ice").

As a child, T'Pol's path in life was inspired by Ambassador V'Lar whom she watched negotiating with the Andorians during the Treaty of 2097 over possession of the planetoid Paan Mokar ("Fallen Hero").

Approximately 16 years before joining the crew of the Enterprise, T'Pol served as an agent for the Vulcan intelligence service. At age 47, she completed her training for the Vulcan Ministry of Security. During an early mission to apprehend a pair of Vulcan criminals, she was forced to shoot and kill one of the fleeing men. She resigned from the service as a result, and the guilt over killing someone face-to-face caused her to suffer a nervous breakdown or emotional collapse which led to her undergoing a procedure, the Fullara, that erased all memory of the incident. This "memory cap" disappeared when she was briefly reactivated as an agent during 2152 in order to capture the criminal Vulcan who eluded her that day, and she experienced another emotional collapse which was alleviated by the support of Captain Archer. Given the option to once again suppress her memory of killing, she chose to live with it instead ("The Seventh").

While in the Ministry of Security, T'Pol was also involved in mission operations at Tomed near Romulan space. Serving under her was Major Talok. However, unbeknownst to T'Pol, Talok was a Romulan spy disguised as a Vulcan working in league with corrupt Administrator V'Las of the Vulcan High Command. Their goal was to promote the eventual conquest of Vulcan by the Romulan Star Empire ("Kir'Shara").

After her resignation from the Ministry of Security, T'Pol served for over a year as the deputy science officer aboard the Vulcan cruiser Seleya, under the command of Captain Voris ("Impulse").

In 2149, T'Pol began her tenure at the High Command's Consulate on Earth, assisting Ambassador Soval in his observation of humanity's progress toward space exploration ("Fusion"). In 2151, then holding the rank of sub-commander, she was selected by Soval to accompany Captain Jonathan Archer during his initial first mission aboard the Enterprise NX-01 as observer and Vulcan representative. When the mission was successful and the Enterprise greenlighted to continue its mission of exploration, T'Pol elected to remain on board as science officer ("Broken Bow").

=== Pa'nar, trellium, mind melds, and emotion ===
T'Pol, who is described by her superiors as a maverick and a rebel, became fascinated with Tolaris, a member of a group of emotionally free Vulcans encountered during the first year of the Enterprise's mission. Tolaris introduced her to the concept of the mind meld, which at the time was considered a taboo activity among Vulcans. She severed her relationship with Tolaris after she asked him to stop the mind meld and he refused, attempting to continue the meld without her consent (essentially a form of mental rape), and causing her to forcefully break the link. She later learned that she had contracted Pa'nar Syndrome from the encounter. This condition was kept in check with medication. In 2154, T'Pol, who had been told that Pa'nar was an incurable virus, learned that the condition was in fact caused by an improperly trained melder, and contrary to what the intolerant (and soon to be overthrown) Vulcan High Command had decreed, it was indeed curable by the touch of an experienced mind – provided to T'Pol by T'Pau.

T'Pol was told that she is genetically incapable of initiating mind melds herself, however following the 2154 overthrow of the Vulcan regime that stigmatized mind-melding she learned otherwise. She performed her first mind meld upon Hoshi Sato, with the assistance of Jonathan Archer, who had learned details about mind melds during a period of time when he held the katra of Surak. In fact, not only is T'Pol telepathic, but the episode "Affliction" revealed that she is able to communicate with Charles "Trip" Tucker III over great distances using her new-found mental abilities. It was established a year later (in "Bound") that this is because of a mating bond between the two.

During T'Pol's early years aboard the Enterprise, she demonstrated an unusual (for a Vulcan) willingness to explore human culture and customs, although she stated that certain human foods do not agree with her. After a discussion with Commander Charles Tucker, she described pecan pie, as a dessert made of "mostly sugar". She began attending the ship's weekly film night social event (with Captain Archer), and expressed particular admiration for the 1931 film Frankenstein. She was reportedly less successful at mastering the art of eating with chopsticks, to the amusement of her crew mates. Prior to her posting aboard the Enterprise, T'Pol on at least one occasion left the Vulcan Compound in San Francisco and visited a jazz music club; the chaotic music generated an emotional response that came back to haunt her during a brief period when she abandoned her nightly meditation ritual (concurrent with her experimentation with mind-melding).

T'Pol also became adept at "play acting", which she found was often needed in order to successfully fulfill a mission. For example, she once pretended to be a slave when Ferengi pirates hijacked the Enterprise ("Acquisition"), distracted a group of Suliban invaders by acting deranged ("Shockwave (Part II)"), and pretended to be a domineering Vulcan commander preparing for an execution ("Precious Cargo"). In the latter example there is a clear indication that T'Pol enjoyed taking part in this sort of deception.

On several occasions during her first two years aboard the Enterprise, T'Pol resisted efforts by her family and the Vulcan High Command to get her to leave the ship and return to her Vulcan obligations. When pressed for a reason by Vulcan Ambassador Soval, T'Pol replied that she found working aboard the Enterprise "gratifying", for which she was chided for engaging in an emotional indulgence.

In 2153, after being ordered to leave the Enterprise and return to Vulcan, T'Pol resigned her commission with the Vulcan High Command in order to accompany the crew of the Enterprise into the Delphic Expanse to find the Xindi, a mysterious race accused of killing seven million humans on Earth. Despite being technically a civilian, she remained as first officer of the Enterprise and the crew continued to refer to her by her High Command rank of Sub-Commander during the mission.

While investigating the Vulcan ship Seleya ("Impulse"), which had become trapped in The Expanse, T'Pol experienced the side effects of Trellium-D, a compound the ship had used to protect itself from anomalies within The Expanse, but which had the side effect of creating psychosis in Vulcans. T'Pol's brief exposure led to her experiencing extreme paranoia and losing control of her emotions. She recovered upon returning to the Enterprise. The compound, which Commander Tucker brought aboard, was necessary to line the ship so that the Enterprise could traverse the Expanse. Captain Archer, rather than line the ship with the concoction (lethal to T'Pol), stored it in a locker in the cargo bay.

T'Pol found herself wanting to experience more of the emotions the Trellium-D had unlocked. In "Damage", it is revealed that she discovered how to liquefy small, safe amounts of the compound and began to secretly inject herself with it, beginning approximately three months prior to the Enterprise arriving at Azati Prime ("Azati Prime"). This led to what she felt was improved relations with her crew mates, in particular chief engineer Trip Tucker, which led to a sexual relationship in "Harbinger" after she understood she was experiencing jealousy when Tucker began making romantic overtures toward a MACO on board. In the same episode, she later attempted to deflect the importance of the act by referring to it as merely an exploration of human sexuality. However, this one-time encounter resulted in the formation of a psychic bond between Trip and T'Pol which does not manifest until the second half of season 4.

Over time, as T'Pol became addicted to the Trellium-D injections, her emotions began to flow more freely. This came to a head when the Enterprise reached Azati Prime ("Azati Prime") and Jonathan Archer chose to undertake a suicide mission in order to complete the Xindi mission. T'Pol's emotional reaction toward Archer's departure and presumed death incapacitated her as a commanding officer (ending up in crying and an attempt to recover him). She attempted to hide her condition, and the Enterprise was nearly destroyed in a subsequent Xindi attack which may or may not have been made worse by T'Pol's state.

After the attack, T'Pol's supply of Trellium-D became difficult to reach (being located in a heavily damaged part of the ship) and she nearly died during a clandestine attempt to retrieve it. Soon after, she lost her temper with Archer (who had since returned to the Enterprise). He indicated he needed her for a difficult (and morally questionable) mission. She was nearly killed while trying to recover more Trellium-D after experiencing an erotic dream involving Tucker. This led her to seek medical help from Dr. Phlox to whom she confessed her addiction.

Although T'Pol subsequently overcame her addiction, Phlox determined that she had permanently damaged her brain, and as a result might never achieve the same level of emotional control she once had. A subsequent encounter with an elderly version of herself (due to an Expanse-related anomaly seen in the episode "E²"—an alternate universe episode) indicated that she will live with the after effects of her Trellium-D exposure for the rest of her life. The older version of T'Pol served aboard an alternate time line version of the Enterprise, which had been transported into the past. Aboard the alternate Enterprise, T'Pol and Trip Tucker had married and conceived a son, Lorian, who at the time of the encounter was the captain of the alternate Enterprise. The older T'Pol advised her that Trip Tucker could provide a safe outlet for her newfound emotions if she could learn to trust him. She also advised her younger self that she could not imagine what her life would have been like without him. T'Pol did not choose to pursue a romantic relationship with Trip when the Enterprise returned to normal space in the Expanse.

Following the Xindi mission, she continued to experience difficulty controlling her emotions and became particularly emotional following the death of her mother.

T'Pol, who (at the time) held the record for the longest time spent by a Vulcan serving with humans, has demonstrated her ability to adapt. Originally, she required a form of medication in order to tolerate the odors given off by humans and Captain Archer's pet dog Porthos (because of Vulcans having a sensitive sense of smell).

It's revealed that she has a sense of humor, one she can demonstrate (as she has in "Future Tense" and other shows, including "Bound"). And, in a case of "when in Rome, do as the Romans do," she has also begun eating some types of foods (fruit, popcorn) with her hands, breaking a long-standing Vulcan taboo in the process.

Following the death of her mother (see below), the divorce of her husband Koss and the discovery of the Kir'Shara, T'Pol began to re-evaluate Surak's teachings and what it means to be Vulcan. As a result, she began to distance herself from some of her crew mates, choosing to spend her free time studying the newly found word of Surak. Her decision had an adverse effect on her relationship with Commander Tucker. (In "Bound", she re-established her romantic relationship with Trip. T'Pol asked Trip to return to the Enterprise and, when he replied that he "would think about it" she showed her emotional commitment by pursuing him down the corridor and kissing him.)

She has also experienced some success in controlling her emotions to a greater degree than she had over the two years. T'Pau's therapeutic mind-meld cured the Pa'nar Syndrome and may have helped restore some of her emotional balance as well. This, combined with the fact that T'Pol no longer has the added stress of living with an incurable, potentially fatal condition, may have calmed her mind sufficiently to maintain control. Despite this, she has admitted to Phlox that she had never before felt so unsure of herself.

=== Relationship with Charles "Trip" Tucker III ===
The relationship between T'Pol and Trip Tucker is a complex one. Initially, the two had a somewhat combative association.

During the third season of Enterprise, while the ship was engaged in pursuing the Xindi weapon in the Expanse, T'Pol and Tucker became increasingly intimate. This process began because Trip had trouble sleeping. Dr. Phlox urged T'Pol to assist Trip by using Vulcan neuropressure, a system of massage that T'Pol referred to as "intimate" and which is frequently conducted in a semi-clothed state.

A few episodes after this, starting in "Impulse", T'Pol begins to take Trellium-D, which has the result of lowering her barriers and producing greater emotion.

In "Similitude", when Doctor Phlox grows a mimetic symbiote of Trip – complete with Trip's memories – the Sim confessed to T'Pol that he (they?) had a deep attraction to her. In "Harbinger", a few months after Trellium-D usage and neuropressure sessions, T'Pol learns that Trip is attracted to a MACO aboard the Enterprise. T'Pol begins to display signs of jealousy regarding Trip's activities with another woman aboard the Enterprise and Trip is jealous of Sim for having been the one to admit "their" feelings for her – ultimately, she and Trip have sex. Afterward, T'Pol attempts to distance herself from the act by referring to it as an exploration of human sexuality. After they engage in sex in "Harbinger", they do not engage in the act again in season 3.

In "E²", an alternate timeline is revealed where Commander Tucker and T'Pol get married and have at least one child, who they meet, called Lorian. It creates an awkward situation but further illuminates their relationship.

In "Zero Hour", T'Pol reveals her age to him, which she indicated Vulcans consider "intimate" information.

In Home, at the end of the Xindi mission, when Trip tells her he has no home left to go to, T'Pol invites him to accompany her home to Vulcan. After arriving on Vulcan, T'Pol is blackmailed into marrying her original betrothed, Koss, in order to save her mother's career. Her mother, T'Les, realizes Trip is in love with her daughter and suggests to him he should express his feelings to T'Pol before the ceremony so that she could have all available information. Trip declines, saying that she is under enough stress and he cares about her too much to make things even more difficult for her. However, T'Pol was not unaware of his feelings. She paused on her way to marry Koss long enough to give Trip a kiss on the cheek, a scandalous public display of affection for a Vulcan, especially in those circumstances.

In "Kir'Shara", following the discovery of the Kir'Shara in season four, T'Pol's husband divorces her and Trip attempts to reconnect their relationship. T'Pol is studying the original teachings of Surak, and disregards that request. Hurt, Trip decides to make a new start and transfers to Enterprise's sister ship NX-02 Columbia, then working up prior to being commissioned. While he is away on Columbia, both he and T'Pol experience telepathic contact in the form of both waking daydreams as well as dreams while sleeping.

An emergency requires Trip to return to the Enterprise. While he is aboard, an attempted takeover by Orions reveals that Trip is the only human aboard who is immune to the pheromones emitted by the Orion women, which proves to T'Pol they have bonded. An undetermined amount of time after the two learn of their bond, their relationship undergoes a major shock during the Terra Prime episodes when Trip and T'Pol learn that they have a child. The baby was a binary clone created using stolen DNA samples of the two by a terrorist group headed by a radical separatist, Paxton, who believed Earth should distance itself and defend itself from alien worlds and influences. The baby, a girl, was named Elizabeth after Trip's sister. As stated by Phlox, the child has Trip's eyes and T'Pol's ears. Elizabeth does not survive due to a flawed procedure during the cloning process. Trip revealed this to T'Pol when he went to her quarters to try to console her. He further indicated that according to Phlox, a different cloning process performed by gene surgeons who were more highly skilled than those employed by Terra Prime would probably result in a viable child. The two grieved together for Elizabeth, whom they had accepted as theirs.

In an alternate reality seen in Star Trek: Lower Decks season 5, T'Pol is mentioned to have been married to Trip for 63 years, causing her to master human emotions.

=== Relationship with Jonathan Archer ===
When T'Pol first reported to duty aboard the Enterprise, Archer resented her assignment due to his distrust of Vulcans and the fact that the Vulcans had refused to provide starcharts and a copy of the Vulcan database unless T'Pol was assigned to the crew. T'Pol would butt heads with Archer about his style of command during the ship's early missions, chastising him for taking chances just to be able to explore new planets. As time passed, T'Pol proved to be a valuable asset to Archer due to her time in space and her past experiences as an officer with command experience. Indeed, her command experience is what secured her position as First Officer. As Enterprise's mission progressed, T'Pol grew very close to Captain Jonathan Archer whose abilities she had come to respect and to whom she had developed a sense of loyalty after he assisted her in bringing to justice a renegade Vulcan Security agent. Her sense of loyalty went so far as to compel her to resign her position with Vulcan High Command and join Enterprise without a commission from either Starfleet or the Vulcans during her mission in the Delphic Expanse. During the Delphic Expanse mission, T'Pol continued to serve as First Officer despite her not holding a commission. After the Delphic Expanse mission, T'Pol opted to remain with Starfleet and with Archer's assistance, bypassed Starfleet training, was directly commissioned with the rank of Commander, and was formally assigned as Archer's First Officer. On the occasions when Archer was thought killed, T'Pol showed her affection for him to the point of crying during the Xindi mission when she believes he has been killed in "Azati Prime". She also grieves in "Zero Hour", when she believes he is dead, by holding close a book of his and pets his dog, Porthos.

In one alternate timeline (depicted in "Twilight"), T'Pol devoted her life to caring for Archer when parasites robbed him of the ability to store long-term memory (the same ones with which he was infected while saving her life). Dr. Phlox later implied that T'Pol had fallen in love with Archer during the time that she took care of him.

=== Starfleet service ===
Near the end of the Xindi mission, T'Pol revealed to Archer and Tucker that she was considering enlisting in Starfleet. Following the Xindi mission, she accepted the commission and received the rank of Commander. In May 2154, T'Pol officially assumed duties as a Starfleet officer.

The final episode "These Are the Voyages..." reveals that T'Pol remained Archer's first officer aboard the Enterprise for a total of ten years. Her relationship with Trip allegedly ended at some point within a year of the death of their cloned child in 2155 (see "Family", below), although she remained emotionally attached to him and expressed concern that she would never see Trip again after the decommissioning of the Enterprise in 2161. Trip's death on a minor mission just prior to the decommissioning affected her deeply, and she expressed a desire to meet his parents.

She also grew comfortable in confiding in the ship's chef during the years prior to the finale. Dialog in the finale suggests that T'Pol was to be assigned to another vessel following the decommissioning of the Enterprise. In the Star Trek novels released following the formation of the United Federation of Planets, T'Pol was promoted to captain and given command of the newly commissioned NX-class starship USS Endeavour, NX-06.

== Family ==
Little is revealed of T'Pol's family until the fourth-season episode "Home", in which her mother T'Les appears. T'Pol's father is deceased. T'Les was an instructor at the Vulcan Science Academy, but resigned in 2154. In the episode "Awakening", she died in her daughter's arms during an attack on a Syrranite encampment in the desert region known as The Forge. T'Pol grieved upon her mother's death; following the death of Trip in 2161, she confessed to Archer that she missed her mother more as time went by.

T'Pol has no siblings. As a child, she had a pet sehlat.

T'Pol was engaged to marry a Vulcan named Koss prior to the start of the Enterprise's mission, with the marriage scheduled for 2151 (about a week after the events of "Breaking the Ice" to be precise) but elected to delay her marriage indefinitely. The fourth-season episode "Home" saw T'Pol having to deal with the consequences of her decision, when she chooses to marry Koss in order to save her mother's professional reputation. She appears to be unaware that Trip has fallen in love with her (although in "The Augments" it is clear that she is beginning to realize his feelings). Prior to her marriage, she negotiated with Koss' family to defer the one-year Vulcan residence obligation required of newly-wed Vulcan females, in order to join Starfleet as a commissioned officer and stay aboard the Enterprise. Only a few months after their marriage, Koss released T'Pol from their arrangement following the death of her mother, and shortly after the marriage was officially dissolved.

In the episode "Carbon Creek", T'Pol tells Captain Archer and Commander Tucker the details of the Vulcans' real first contact with humanity on Earth in the 1950s. T'Mir (T'Pol's great grandmother) was involved in a survey mission when her spacecraft crash landed on Earth in 1957. She and two other Vulcan crew members were forced to live among humans for several months in a small American mining town called Carbon Creek, hiding their Vulcan identity. During her stay, T'Mir provided a patent office with a revolutionary material (Velcro), in order to raise college tuition money for a human teenager whom she had befriended in town. T'Pol kept her great-grandmother's purse.

In the alternate timeline seen in "E²", T'Pol marries Trip and they have a son, Lorian, who becomes the captain of the Enterprise upon the death of Captain Archer. In this episode, T'Pol met an older version of herself (approximately 180 years old).

The fourth-season episode "Demons" revealed that T'Pol had a six-month-old daughter, the father being Trip. It was later learned that a terrorist group called Terra Prime had created the child by cloning. Samples of T'Pol and Trip's DNA stolen from the Enterprise were the source of the child's genetic material. The cloning procedure, however, was not performed correctly. The child — whom T'Pol named Elizabeth in honor of Trip's deceased sister — died soon after being rescued from the Mars facility where she was being held.

The existence of a psychic bond between T'Pol and Trip is revealed during the fourth season; no such psychic bond is indicated between T'Pol and Koss. The final episode, "These Are the Voyages...", mentioned that T'Pol and Trip ended their relationship within a year of the events of "Terra Prime".

Outside of established Star Trek canon, novels have been published based on the series that retconned this, saying that the two are still involved with each other. The book The Romulan War: To Brave the Storm states that T'Pol has two children—a daughter T'Mir and a son Lorian.

== Mirror Universe ==
A two-part episode in the fourth season, "In a Mirror, Darkly", introduced a Mirror Universe version of T'Pol. This version is more cynical and openly emotional than her "real universe" counterpart, and is also openly sexually manipulative, particularly of Commander Tucker.

In the Mirror Universe, T'Pol underwent pon farr at some point in the recent past, and Trip mated with her in order to get her through it. Physically, she differs from her real universe counterpart in that she has long hair (in reality, Blalock eschewed her wig for her normal hair) and, like other female officers in the Terran Empire, she wears a two-piece uniform with a bare midriff (although after transferring to the captured USS Defiant (NCC-1764), she adopts a TOS-style miniskirt uniform temporarily until she is able to obtain a more standard Empire uniform).

Mirror-T'Pol's mind meld abilities appear to be somewhat more advanced than those of her counterpart, as she is capable of placing a form of post-hypnotic suggestion into the minds of those with whom she melds; since the real universe T'Pol had only recently learned how to meld, it is unlikely she had yet achieved this level of melding proficiency. She also appears to be more emotional than her counterpart, showing open sarcasm and contempt for Archer, and is seen to either grin or snarl (depending on one's point of view) during a brief bout of hand-to-hand combat with Hoshi Sato.

Eventually, Mirror-T'Pol is forcibly transferred from the Defiant to the ISS Avenger when Jonathan Archer attempts to rid his ship of all alien crew members. T'Pol becomes convinced that Archer will never allow Vulcans to be equals, and tries to stop him from taking over the Empire. Mirror-T'Pol was inspired by reading the historical logs of our universe's Defiant, which revealed a universe where Humans, Vulcans, and other aliens lived as equals in a benevolent Federation. After recruiting the ISS Avenger's alien crew members to the rebellion, T'Pol is caught and interrogated by Archer. Archer and Hoshi Sato express a desire to have her executed following her interrogation, the Defiant immediately enters battle, and Mirror T'pols fate is not shown.

During the episode's stated date of January 2155, T'Pol foreshadows future events, such as the fall of the Terran Empire after several centuries (which would be chronicled in the Mirror Universe episodes of Star Trek: Deep Space Nine.)

== Portrayal ==
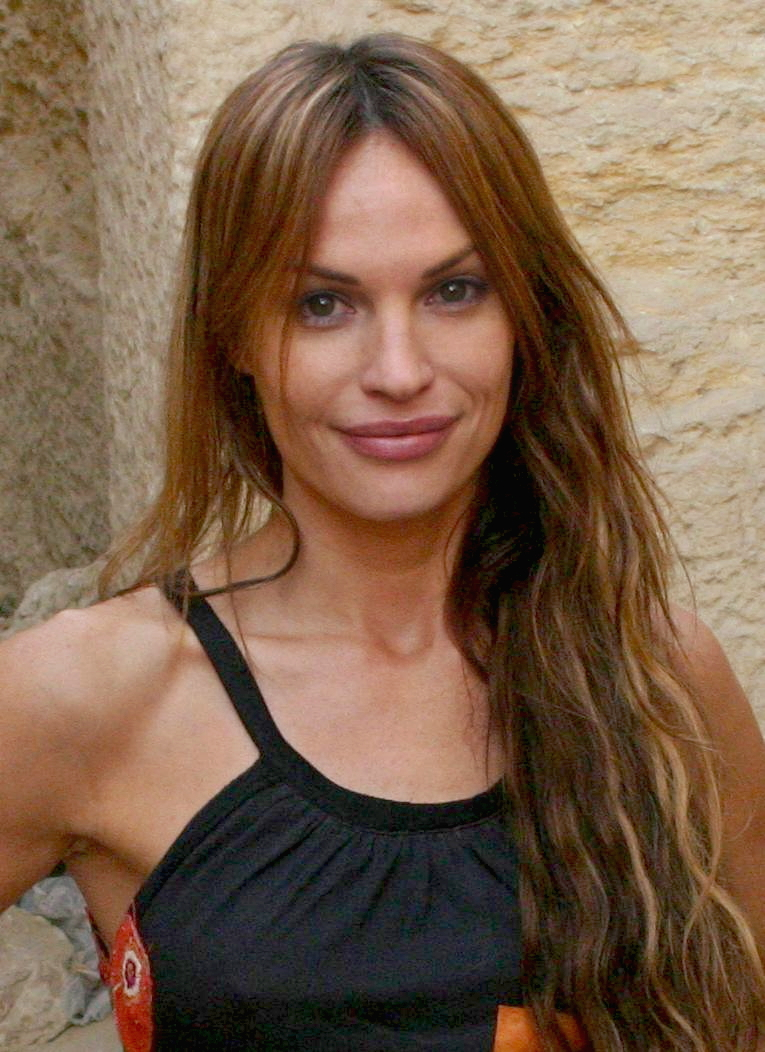
Jolene Blalock

Blalock turned down the role three times before accepting. The costume and makeup, including ears and wig, took about two hours to apply. Blalock found it helped her get into character: "It's really cool. Once I'm in the outfit, I am T'Pol." She describes the character as "feline in movement" and says "she does not look at humans condescendingly, though she is a superior race, so it may seem that way. She's just learning about human nature and the positives of feeling emotion."

Blalock was daunted by the prospect of stepping into the shoes of Spock, to live up to the work of Leonard Nimoy that defined what it meant to be a Vulcan. Co-star John Billingsly (Doctor Phlox) said Blalock was very method in her approach to T'Pol, and that she redecorated her trailer so that she was surrounded by beautiful space images. Blalock wanted the character to be "more Vulcan", stating: "I personally believe that T'Pol should have more of her Vulcan culture. I don't believe she should be so desperate to be like everyone else, because the original Star Trek which I grew up with, had a very simple message that I took from it, and that is that not everyone is like me, and I'm not perfect, and nobody's perfect, and that's okay." She felt the character was undermined by inconsistencies and continuity problems. For example: "T'Pol gets sick, terminally ill, and they never readdress it. There's the characteristic where Vulcans don't eat food with their hands, and yet they'll write scenes where T'Pol is eating popcorn at a movie or Trip will bring T'Pol a peach."

She found T'Pol's relationship with Trip unlikely, not seeing what common ground the characters had: "They write it, I do it. I don't see it, personally. T'Pol's a Vulcan—how could she have a relationship? And he's so emotional."

She was critical of how the character ended up, and said, "I wish the best for T'Pol, and I don't wish her to be viewed as everything that they made her—a drug addict, weak woman, confused, lost."

== Reception ==
Peter Schorn of IGN said that Blalock's performance and the character itself were fine but was critical of the setup. He said the character immediately stood out as "an obvious retread of Jeri Ryan's fanboy-delighting Seven of Nine character from Voyager" and that despite every other Vulcan wearing loose robes, T'Pol wore a skintight jumpsuit, which "showed how craven the producers could be and how little they thought of the audience as being anything more than hormone-enthralled nerds." Reviewing the series premiere, Hal Boedeker of the Orlando Sentinel singled out Blalock for praise: "Star Trek purists might not be amused, but the captivating Blalock energizes the franchise. Enterprise needs every bit of pizazz she can supply." The book Beyond the Final Frontier: An Unauthorised Review of the Trek Universe on Television and Film stated: "At first glance, she's merely eye candy, and indeed during the first season, the writers found little for her to do but smoulder." They praised Blalock's performance saying she "approached the least subtle of roles with a clever understatement" and "She's easily the funniest, sexiest, smartest regular actor to be cast in Star Trek in 15 years." In his 2022 rewatch, Keith DeCandido of Tor.com praised Blalock, saying she overcame the setup and costume of the character "to give us a magnificently mature and complicated character."

In 2016, Wired ranked T'Pol as the 10th most important character of Starfleet within the Star Trek science fiction universe. In 2017, Screen Rant ranked T'Pol the 8th most attractive person in the Star Trek universe. In 2018, The Wrap ranked T'Pol as the 28th best character of Star Trek overall. They said her "acting could sometimes be as ridiculous as her fanservice outfits" but that it was fun to watch the Vulcan grapple with their emotions. In 2018, CBR ranked Jolene Blalock as the 17th best actor of the Star Trek franchise. Chris Snellgrove said the Blalock was a victim of both bad writing and bad direction. When the show needed ratings they found ways to remove her clothes; he said "this exploitation is desperate and sad, and the actor deserved better." CBR ranked T'Pol as the 4th "fiercest" female character of the Star Trek universe. Alexandra August wrote that T'Pol continues the tradition of "catsuited ice queens started by Seven of Nine" and, similar to her predecessor, "despite the fact that her appearance was gratuitously sexual, the conflicted Vulcan is brought to life beautifully by Blalock."

=== Awards ===
For her performance as T'Pol, Blalock was nominated for a Saturn Award in the category Best Supporting Actress on Television, which she won. Blalock was again nominated in the same category, three more times.

== See also ==
- List of Star Trek: Enterprise characters
