= Amok Time =

- Star Trek: The Original Series episode
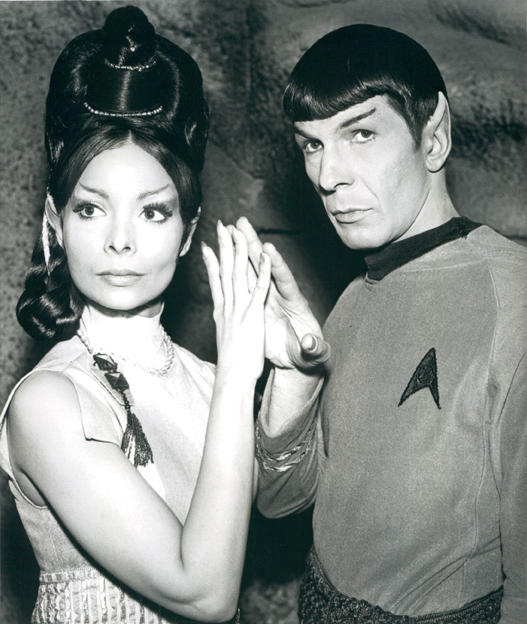
- Arlene Martel as T'Pring and Leonard Nimoy as Spock
- Episode no.: Season 2 Episode 1
- Directed by: Joseph Pevney
- Written by: Theodore Sturgeon
- Cinematography by: Jerry Finnerman
- Production code: 034
- Original air date: September 15, 1967

Guest appearances
- Celia Lovsky – T'Pau; Arlene Martel – T'Pring; Lawrence Montaigne – Stonn; Byron Morrow – Admiral Komack

Episode chronology
← Previous "Operation – Annihilate!"	Next → "Who Mourns for Adonais?"
- Star Trek: The Original Series season 2

"Amok Time" is the second season premiere episode of the American science fiction television series Star Trek. Written by science fiction author Theodore Sturgeon, scored by Gerald Fried, and directed by Joseph Pevney, it first aired on September 15, 1967.

The episode features First Officer Spock returning to his homeworld for a brutal Vulcan wedding ritual. It is the only episode of The Original Series to depict scenes on the planet Vulcan.

It was the first episode to air (though the fifth, by production code) of season 2 featuring Ensign Pavel Chekov (Walter Koenig) as the ship's navigator. It was also the first episode to list "DeForest Kelley as Dr. McCoy" in the opening credits, and the first episode broadcast in the series' new time slot of 8:30 pm on Friday night. This is the first episode to use the "Vulcan salute" and introduced the concept of pon farr, the Vulcan mating cycle.

== Plot ==
Spock, first officer of the USS Enterprise, exhibits unusual, moody behavior and requests leave on his home planet Vulcan. Captain Kirk and Chief Medical Officer Dr. McCoy agree, and Kirk diverts Enterprise. Kirk receives orders from Starfleet to represent the Federation at the inauguration ceremony for Altair VI's new president. Though Kirk sets course for Altair VI, Spock changes course back to Vulcan, though claims no memory of having done so.

Kirk orders Spock to Sickbay, where McCoy finds evidence of physical and emotional stress which will kill him if not treated. Spock explains that he is undergoing pon farr, a condition male Vulcans experience periodically throughout their adult life; he must mate or die. Kirk sets course for Vulcan, believing Spock's life is more important than his career.

On Vulcan, Spock invites Kirk and McCoy to accompany him to the wedding. T'Pring, Spock's betrothed, arrives with Stonn, a pureblood Vulcan whom she prefers to Spock. T'Pau, a renowned matriarch, begins the ceremony. However, T'Pring demands the kal-if-fee, ritual combat between Spock and a champion she selects; she chooses Kirk. Spock begs T'Pau to forbid it, but T'Pau leaves the decision to Kirk; another champion will be selected if he refuses. Kirk accepts the challenge, only to learn that it is to the death.

The two fight with lirpa. Kirk is challenged by Spock's strength as well as the thinner atmosphere of Vulcan. T'Pau lets McCoy inject Kirk with a compound to offset the effects of the Vulcan atmosphere. Spock later garrots Kirk with an ahn'woon. McCoy declares Kirk dead and requests transport to Enterprise.

Spock renounces his claim on T'Pring, who explains that she feared losing Stonn in the kal-if-fee. By choosing Kirk, T'Pring would have Stonn either way: If Spock was the victor, he would release her from the marriage for having made the challenge, and if Kirk won, he would not want her. Spock compliments T'Pring on her logic and warns Stonn that "having is not so pleasing a thing after all as wanting".

Aboard Enterprise, Spock intends to submit himself for trial for killing Kirk, when he discovers Kirk alive and well, prompting a rare display of joy. The injection McCoy gave Kirk was a neuroparalyzer. Spock admits that he lost all desire for T'Pring after he thought he killed Kirk. At T'Pau's request, Starfleet has belatedly given the Enterprise permission to travel to Vulcan.

== Reception ==
For the franchise's 30th anniversary, TV Guide ranked "Amok Time" No. 2 on its list of the 10 best Star Trek episodes. In 2009, Zack Handlen of The A.V. Club gave the episode an A rating. In 2012, The A.V. Club ranked this episode as one of top ten "must see" episodes of the original series.

In 2012, The Christian Science Monitor ranked this the best episode of the original Star Trek.

In 2014, Gizmodo ranked "Amok Time" as the 12th best episode of Star Trek, out of the over 700 ones made by that time. IGN ranked "Amok" number 9 in a top ten list of original series episodes.

In 2015, Wired magazine did not recommend skipping this episode in their binge-watching guide for the original series.

In 2015, Polygon ranked "Amok Time" as one of the three best Spock-centric episodes of Star Trek.

In 2015, SyFy ranked this episode as one of the top ten essential Star Trek original series episodes.

In 2015, New York Public Library cited this episode as having Spock's second best scene in the show.

In 2016, The Hollywood Reporter rated "Amok Time" the 28th best television episode of all Star Trek franchise television prior to Star Trek: Discovery, including live-action and the animated series but not counting the movies. In 2016, Newsweek ranked "Amok Time" as one of the best episodes of the original series, noting it has one of the most memorable fights in Star Trek. In 2016, Business Insider ranked "Amok Time" the 10th best episode of the original series.

In 2016, Radio Times ranked the duel between Kirk and Spock on Vulcan as the 15th best moment in all Star Trek. They note this shows the audience the Vulcan home planet of Vulcan for the first time, and also introduces the Pon Farr aspect of Vulcan culture.

In 2017, Business Insider ranked "Amok Time" the 10th best episode of the original series. They note this is the first episode to use the phrase "Live long and prosper" in Star Trek.

In 2018, Collider ranked this episode the second best original series episode.

In 2018, PopMatters ranked this the 10th best episode of the original series. They highlighted Spock's line "After a time, you may find that having is not so pleasing a thing after all as wanting. It is not logical, but it is often true." while noting the introduction of planet Vulcan, Pon Farr, various guest stars, and what they call a "thrilling gladiatorial battle".

A 2018 Star Trek binge-watching guide by Den of Geek recommended this episode as one of the best of the original series.

In 2019, Nerdist included this episode on their "Best of Spock" binge-watching guide.

In 2019, CBR ranked this episode as one of the top 8 most memorable episodes of the original Star Trek.

In 2024 Hollywood.com ranked Amok Time at number 7 out of the 79 original series episodes.

== Legacy ==
Gerald Fried's incidental music for the fight—titled The Ritual/Ancient Battle/2nd Kroykah—became a standard underscore for combat scenes in season 2. It was notably spoofed during the Medieval Times sequence in the Jim Carrey film The Cable Guy (1996).

Leonard Nimoy first used his signature Vulcan salute in this episode.

The chart-topping British pop band T'Pau took their name from the Vulcan matriarch who presides over events on the planet.

The Omegaverse genre of speculative erotic fiction is noted as having been influenced by the episode.

The episode was parodied in the Futurama episode Why Must I Be a Crustacean in Love?
