= Trip Tucker =

Star Trek: Enterprise fictional character

- Star Trek character
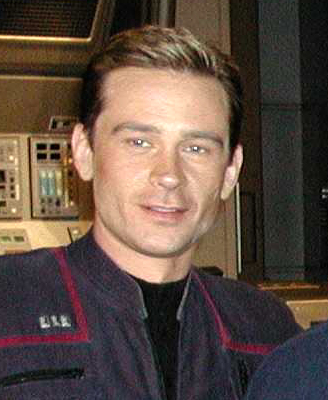
- Connor Trinneer as Charles "Trip" Tucker
- First appearance: "Broken Bow" (2001)
- Last appearance: "These Are the Voyages..." (2005)
- Created by: Rick Berman; Brannon Braga
- Portrayed by: Connor Trinneer

In-universe information
- Species: Human
- Gender: Male
- Affiliation: Starfleet
- Family: Charles Tucker II (father); Elizabeth Tucker (sister); Charles Tucker (grandfather)
- Significant other: T'Pol
- Children: Lorian Tucker (son; alternate timeline); Elizabeth T. Tucker (daughter; clone) unknown daughter (daughter; human/Xyrillian hybrid)
- Posting: Chief Engineer, Enterprise, Columbia
- Rank: Commander

Charles "Trip" Tucker III, portrayed by Connor Trinneer, is a fictional character in the television series Star Trek: Enterprise.

Tucker was the chief engineer on the Enterprise and also briefly served in the same role aboard at the Enterprise's sister ship Columbia.

== Biography ==
Tucker was born in 2121. His nickname "Trip" is short for "Triple", as he is the third generation of his family to be named Charles Tucker. He joined the United Earth Starfleet in 2139 and first met Jonathan Archer around 2143, a decade prior to the launch of Enterprise, when the two worked together on an early warp 2 prototype vessel using the warp engine designed by Archer's father, Henry Archer.

While a knowledgeable engineer, Tucker can be rash and "illogical", an opinion that early on causes friction between him and Enterprise's Vulcan science officer, T'Pol. During the first year of Enterprise's mission, he finds himself coping with situations with which no Starfleet engineer has ever coped, and is a key player in the vessel finally achieving maximum speed at warp 5.

Tucker also enjoys occasional romantic relationships, including one with an exotic alien engineer in the episode "Unexpected". When challenged about these relationships, his stock phrase is, "I was a perfect gentleman". He is statistically the greatest charmer aboard the Enterprise, and he has gone down in Star Trek history as the first human male ever to be pregnant and the first human male ever to be in a relationship with a member of another species.

In the last episode of the second season, Earth was attacked by an alien race called the Xindi. The attack was made by a prototype weapon that struck from Florida crossing into Venezuela, over the Caribbean Sea, and caused the deaths of 7 million people, including Tucker's sister. This left Tucker emotionally scarred and unable to sleep without experiencing vivid nightmares. At the request of Dr. Phlox, Tucker agreed to undergo Vulcan neuropressure treatments with T'Pol. Although the treatments required very intimate contact between the two, no signs were seen at first of anything beyond a professional relationship developing between the officers.

At a crucial point during the Xindi mission, Tucker suffered a potentially fatal injury, and the only way to save his life was to create a clone to harvest needed brain cells. The clone, named "Sim", grew to adulthood over only a few days, and many of the crew became fond of him, in particular T'Pol, who actually kissed Sim after he confessed to being attracted to T'Pol — but adding that he was uncertain whether those feelings were his own or Tucker's. Against Sim's objections, Archer ordered him to undergo the medical procedure to extract the needed cells to save Tucker's life, though this proved fatal to Sim.

As the Xindi mission progressed, Tucker found himself growing closer to T'Pol, and the two briefly became lovers, an event T'Pol later dismissed as an experiment, although the real cause was a side effect of her addiction to the substance Trellium D, which affected her emotional judgment.

Tucker admitted to T'Pol's mother he was in love with her daughter during a trip to Vulcan with her after the Xindi mission, during which she decided to marry her fiancé Koss in an arranged marriage. Although T'Pol's mother encouraged Tucker to express his feelings to her daughter, he chose not to do so. Later, following the dissolution of T'Pol's marriage, Tucker considered becoming involved with her again. In the episode "Observer Effect", T'Pol expressed great concern for Tucker, suggesting her feelings for him remained strong despite her claims to the contrary.

In 2154, during a mission to prevent a Romulan automated marauder from starting a war, Tucker determined that his attraction to T'Pol was negatively affecting his ability to do his job. After the mission, he requested, and received, a transfer to the new NX Class starship, Columbia.

During this period, Tucker began experiencing vivid daydreams involving T'Pol, without understanding that she was actually unintentionally communicating with him via mental telepathy when she attempted to meditate. In the episode "Bound", it was revealed that Tucker and T'Pol had become psychically bonded when they had made love a year earlier, although this link apparently did not manifest itself right away.

During the events of the episode "Divergence", Tucker was temporarily reassigned to Enterprise to facilitate repairs following a run-in with the Klingons. He subsequently submitted a request to Archer return to Enterprise full-time.

Tucker served as Enterprise's chief engineer for a full decade, and prepared to transfer to one of the newly built warp 7-capable starships following the decommissioning of Enterprise in 2161, which was to coincide with the signing of the Federation Charter. The series finale "These Are the Voyages..." revealed that Tucker and T'Pol ended their romantic relationship at some point after the events of "Terra Prime", for reasons as yet unrevealed. Despite this, the two remained close, and Tucker had to reassure T'Pol that the decommissioning of Enterprise and their reassignment to different vessels would not have any bearing on their friendship.

In the last episode, when Shran's former associates track down Enterprise and board the ship, they demand that Archer take them to Shran, but the captain refuses. The aliens are about to kill Archer, so Trip, thinking fast, tells them that he will take them to Shran. When Archer protests, the aliens knock him out. Trip leads the aliens into what appears to be a harmless utility closet — he tells them it is simply a com station and he is going to get Shran to come to them. Trip tells them he just needs to connect a couple of things, but when he brings a pair of conduits together, a massive explosion erupts, taking out both Trip and the aliens. Trip dies after being fatally wounded. However, what is seen is a holodeck simulation being run by Will Riker. Whether his death is an actual event is not definitively established.

Also, in the Star Trek Enterprise relaunch novels set after "These Are the Voyages...", it was revealed that Trip's death from the explosion was faked so he could join Section 31 to spy on the Romulans, however this has never been solidified as being canon.

== Personal life ==
In 2153, Tucker lost his sister, Elizabeth, in the Xindi attack on Earth which destroyed her hometown in southern Florida. In a first-season episode, "Fusion", he reveals he has a brother with whom he practiced dancing, although he is never seen. His parents survived the attack and later relocated to Mississippi; they are invited to attend the signing of the United Federation of Planets treaty in 2161, and keep their promise to attend even after Tucker's death. T'Pol requests the opportunity to meet them at this occasion, but whether she does is not known.

At least three offspring have — directly or indirectly — been linked to Tucker:

- In 2151, Tucker is accidentally impregnated by a Xyrillian female, but has the unborn fetus transplanted into another Xyrillian before it was born. The offspring is not genetically related to Tucker as Xyrillian reproduction only uses the mother's genes. No further information about this offspring has been revealed. ("Unexpected")
- In an alternate timeline in the episode "E²", at some point following an incident that sent Enterprise back to the year 2037, Tucker and T'Pol marry and have a son, Lorian, whose fate after the restoration of the timeline has yet to be revealed.
- In 2155, in the episode "Demons", Tucker learns that he has a six-month-old daughter, the mother apparently being T'Pol. It is revealed that the daughter was cloned using Tucker and T'Pol's DNA, which was stolen from Enterprise by an infiltrator working for Terra Prime. The cloning procedure was improperly executed, however, and the daughter — whom T'Pol named "Elizabeth" after Tucker's sister — dies soon after being rescued. The child's death leaves Tucker emotionally devastated as T'Pol — herself emotionally drained — tries to comfort him.

Trip is knowledgeable about the ancient board game Go, and actually has a Go board in his cabin (he is seen playing the game with the title character of the episode "Cogenitor")

Trip has a brief romance with princess Kaitamma (played by Padma Lakshmi) from Krios Prime in "Precious Cargo". They enjoy a passionate one-night stand when the pair find themselves alone on an uninhabited planet. When Trip returns to the Enterprise, and she to her own planet, she invites Trip to come visit her on Krios Prime after she will have become ruler.

Trip and Malcolm Reed become close friends after being stuck together in Shuttlepod 1 for 3 days after they find evidence that the Enterprise was destroyed (Shuttlepod One).

== Alternate timelines ==
In the alternate timeline seen in the episode "Twilight", Tucker becomes captain of Enterprise following the incapacitation of Jonathan Archer and T'Pol's resignation from Starfleet. He is killed when Enterprise's bridge is destroyed shortly before Archer resets the timeline.

As stated above, the episode "E²" takes place in an altered timeline. Except that Lorian is the son of T'Pol and Tucker, little else is revealed of the alternate Trip. He is long deceased by the time Lorian's version of Enterprise makes rendezvous with its namesake.

The Star Trek: Lower Decks episode "Fissure Quest" depicts a version of T'Pol from a timeline where she was married to Tucker for 63 years.

== Mirror Universe ==
In the Mirror Universe two-part episode, Tucker is the chief engineer of the ISS Enterprise, but is badly disfigured due to exposure from heavy delta ray radiation emanating from his Enterprise's engines. This version of Tucker also had a sexual relationship with the Mirror T'Pol, who once exploited this relationship in her attempt to sabotage Enterprise; she used a mind meld to implant a posthypnotic suggestion in Tucker's mind. It is implied this is not the first time she has used him in this way. Tucker is subsequently tortured in the agony booth, but vehemently denies any wrongdoing, insisting that he has always been loyal to the Empire and Archer. In the end, Archer tells Reed to break Tucker before releasing him from the booth, much to Tucker's horror. He later confronts T'Pol in main engineering and tells her he spent four hours in the booth. This version of Tucker, along with much of the ISS Enterprise crew, travels to the USS Defiant – which had been discovered in the Mirror Universe – and tries to get the ship working to further the Mirror Archer's attempt to take over the Terran Empire. Tucker successfully foils a plot by the Mirror Phlox to sabotage key systems aboard Defiant.

== Novels ==
In the framing story of the Enterprise novel, Last Full Measure (May 2006), it is revealed that Tucker did not actually die in "These Are the Voyages...", but survived and lived to be over 120 years of age (Tucker meets the young James T. Kirk and his family). The details of this plot point are revealed in the novel The Good That Men Do (written, as was Last Full Measure, by Andy Mangels and Michael A. Martin).

In The Good That Men Do, Tucker becomes impatient to do something about the coming Romulan threat to Earth, though Starfleet has ordered Enterprise to return home to bolster the upcoming formation of the Coalition of Planets (a precursor to the United Federation of Planets).

Tucker's crewmate, Malcolm Reed, puts him in contact with Harris who operates within Section 31. Tucker agrees to an undercover mission into Romulan territory to find and neutralize the Romulans' new warp 7 engine program, which will be faster than almost all other warp drives in existence (at this time the Vulcans had warp 7 capability) and would undoubtedly endanger the Coalition. He is successful, but in the process, he learns that Vulcans and Romulans were once one species. Tucker reluctantly agrees to remain officially "dead", lest this secret become public and thereby endanger the newly formed coalition. Also, the novel suggests that Tucker's extended lifespan is partly due to the genetic engineering he receives to pass as a Romulan.

In the novel The Romulan War: To Brave the Storm, it is hinted that although Commander Trip Tucker III is officially classified as dead, a small chance existed that he made it out of the escape pod. Resuming his life under an assumed name, he has two children with T'Pol, a son and daughter.

== Portrayal ==
Connor Trinneer based Trip's accent on a character from Oklahoma he had done in a play, only for it to be later established that the character was from Florida. Before Trinneer was cast, Zach Galligan also auditioned for the role. As a conceptual model for the character Trinneer thought of him as "a wonderkind NASCAR engine guy mechanic who happened to be in this other place."

== Reception ==
In 2009, IGN ranked Trip as the 21st best character of Star Trek.

In 2017, Screen Rant ranked the Trip the 13th most attractive person in the Star Trek universe.

In 2018, TheWrap ranked Trip Tucker as the 16th best main cast character of Star Trek overall.

== See also ==
- List of Star Trek: Enterprise characters
