= First Flight (Star Trek: Enterprise) =

- Star Trek: Enterprise episode
- Episode no.: Season 2 Episode 24
- Directed by: LeVar Burton
- Written by: John Shiban; Chris Black
- Production code: 224
- Original air date: May 14, 2003

Guest appearances
- Brigid Brannagh - Ruby; Vaughn Armstrong - Admiral/Commodore Forrest; Keith Carradine - A.G. Robinson; Michael Canavan - Vulcan Advisor #1; Victor Bevine - Flight Controller

Episode chronology
← Previous "Regeneration"	Next → "Bounty"
- Star Trek: Enterprise season 2

"First Flight" is the fiftieth episode of the American science fiction television series Star Trek: Enterprise, the twenty-fourth episode of the second season. It first aired on May 14, 2003, on UPN. It was written by John Shiban and Chris Black, and was directed by Star Trek: The Next Generation actor LeVar Burton (Geordi La Forge).

Set in the 22nd century, the series follows the adventures of the first Starfleet starship Enterprise, registration NX-01. In this episode, after Captain Jonathan Archer (Scott Bakula) is informed of the death of his former colleague, A.G. Robinson (Keith Carradine), he relates the story of breaking the warp 2.5 barrier to T'Pol (Jolene Blalock) while investigating a dark matter nebula.

The episode was inspired by the story of the first American astronauts as seen in the film The Right Stuff. Several sets were specifically built for this episode, and a reference to the designer of the Enterprise from the original Star Trek series is included in the story. Three crew-members from the U.S. Navy aircraft carrier USS Enterprise (CVN-65) appeared in this episode, and handed over a flag from the ship to the cast and crew. Critical reception to this episode was mostly positive, with praise directed at Scott Bakula. The episode received the second-lowest number of viewers received by Enterprise at that point, which was blamed on it being aired opposite the series finale of Dawson's Creek.

== Plot ==
As Enterprise is about to investigate a dark matter cloud, Captain Archer is informed by Admiral Forrest that his former Starfleet colleague, Captain Robinson, has died in a rock climbing accident. Archer, seeking solitude, desires to travel into the nebula in a shuttlepod armed with spatial charges to excite the dark matter. Sub-Commander T'Pol, noting that captains are prohibited from traveling off-ship unaccompanied, joins him and convinces him to tell the story of his friend Robinson and the Warp 5 program.

In a series of flashbacks, Commander Archer meets with Commodore Forrest, and is informed that although he excelled in simulations, his colleague Commander Robinson has been awarded the warp 3 test ship, the NX Alpha. Disappointed, Archer goes to the 602 Club, a local bar, bumping into Robinson there. Later, Robinson takes the scheduled flight aboard the NX Alpha, breaking the warp 2.0 barrier. He refuses a command from Forrest to stop and instead increases speed; the craft soon destabilizes and is destroyed as it approaches warp 2.2, but Robinson escapes. The Vulcans argue that the warp program should be postponed, but Archer wants the program, and his father's engine research, to continue. Archer, and his new friend Lieutenant Tucker, then go to the 602 Club to discuss the problem. Robinson arrives and blames Archer's father, and he and Archer end up in a fist fight.

The next day Archer discovers Robinson packing up the contents of his locker. He concedes that it is primarily an intermix problem, but that the engine could still work. Archer and Robinson then steal the NX Beta, with Tucker in flight control, but it starts to suffer the same issues as the Alpha. As Starfleet security detains Tucker, Archer and Robinson coax the engines to warp 2.5. Archer and Robinson are reprimanded, and the program is grounded for a year, but they have proved that his father's design was sound.

Archer launches his final two charges into the cloud, and a breathtaking nebula slowly reveals itself. Archer calls T'Pol to watch the actual nebula with her eyes, rather than monitor it through the sensors. T'Pol mentions the human tradition of first discoverers of astronomical phenomena having naming rights. Archer makes a sarcastic crack about calling it the "T'Pol/Archer Nebula". T'Pol gently responds that she was thinking Archer could name it the "Robinson Nebula", after his friend.

== Production ==
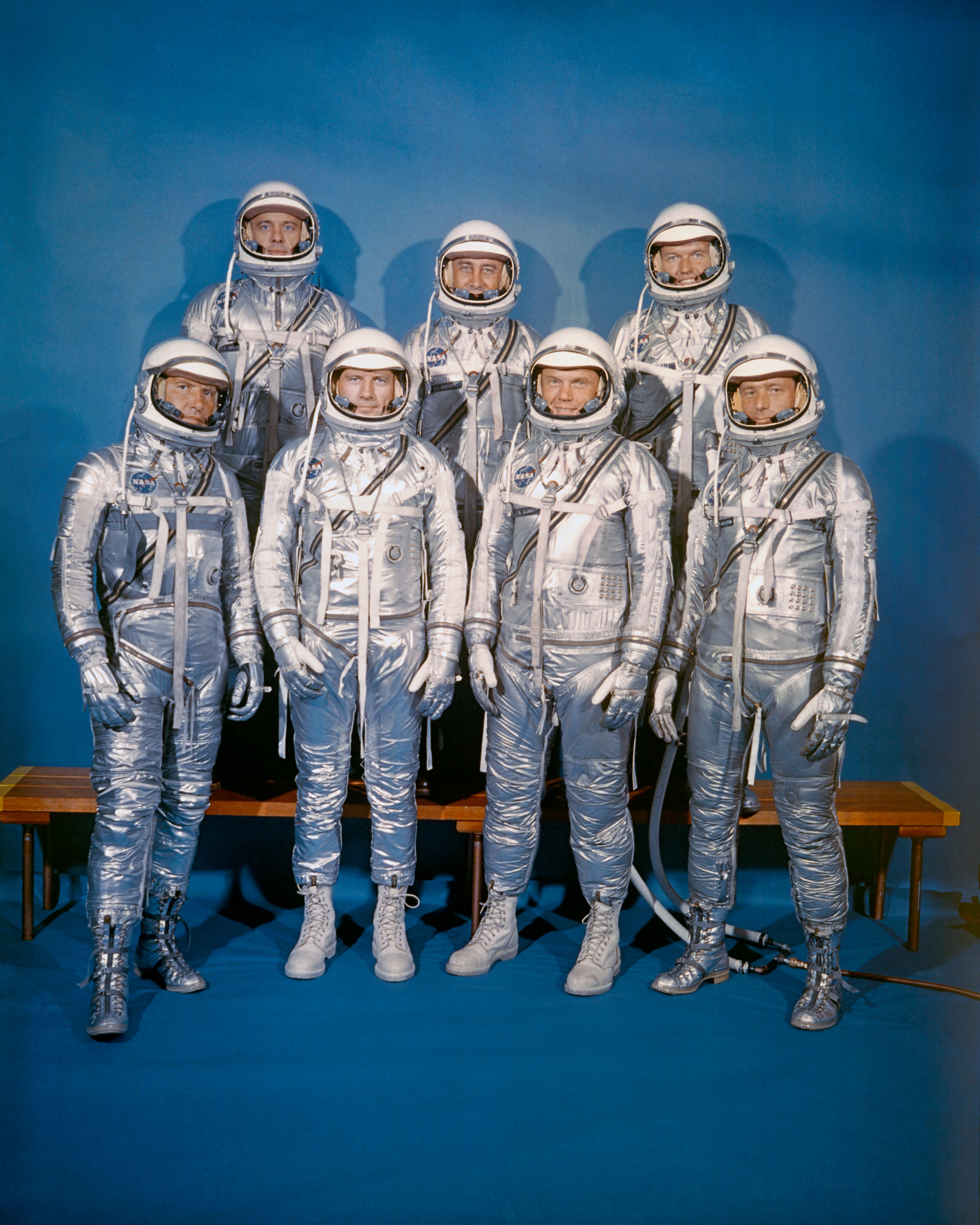
"First Flight" was inspired by the story of the first NASA astronauts (Mercury Seven pictured)

"First Flight" was inspired by the 1983 film The Right Stuff, the story of the test pilots at Edwards Air Force Base and the first NASA astronauts. Reference is also made to the Apollo 11 lunar landing, when Archer mentions that no-one remembers astronaut Buzz Aldrin's first words when he stepped onto the moon. Aldrin's actual first words were "Beautiful view."

Warp drive was first mentioned in Gene Roddenberry's first-draft pitch for Star Trek, dated March 11, 1964, although in that version it was referred to as a "space-warp drive". The drive allows for a vessel to travel faster than the speed of light by warping space-time around the ship itself. In 1994, physicist Miguel Alcubierre proposed the Alcubierre drive, using a similar theory. In the Star Trek universe, Zefram Cochrane invented the drive in 2063. Cochrane was portrayed by James Cromwell in the film Star Trek: First Contact and re-appeared in this role in the pilot of Enterprise, "Broken Bow". That episode showed the culmination of the development of the warp 5 engine, which was designed by Jonathan Archer's father, Henry, in the launch of the Enterprise itself. The Vulcans during this period gave oversight and advice to Starfleet in the development of the warp drive, but sought to slow the progress of the humans. "First Flight" showed a previously unseen period in the development of the fictional warp drive, with the pursuit of the warp 2 barrier. The dark matter mentioned in this episode is a real phenomenon, although it is unclear exactly what it is. It cannot be seen by telescopes, and it is theorised that it makes up a great deal of the matter in the universe.

John Shiban and Chris Black wrote "First Flight", the fiftieth episode of Enterprise. Former Star Trek: The Next Generation actor LeVar Burton directed the episode, his second of the season and fourth overall. He had previously directed episodes of other shows in the franchise, including the hundredth episode of Star Trek: Voyager, "Timeless". In this episode, Tucker states that his commanding officer at the testing facility is Captain Jefferies, this is a direct reference to artist and set designer Matt Jefferies, designer of the original USS Enterprise (NCC-1701). Jefferies died two months after the episode was aired.

Production began on March 10, 2003, and concluded on March 18. The first days' shoot consisted of scenes in the shuttlepod with Blalock and Bakula as other members of the cast were still shooting scenes for the episodes "Horizon" and "Regeneration". The present-day scenes were completed on the second day of filming, with the remaining five days of shooting being devoted to the flashback scenes. Sets were built specifically for this episode, including the NX Command Center, the 602 Club and the interior of the NX prototype vessels.

=== Casting ===
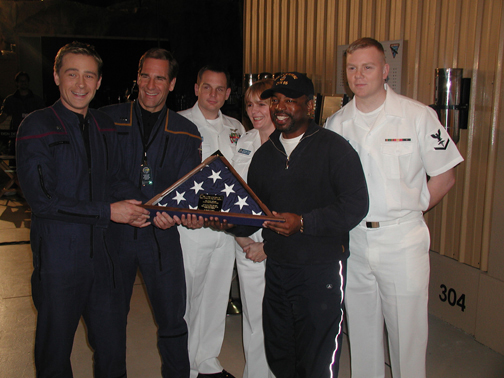
Three crew members of the U.S. Navy aircraft carrier Enterprise present a flag to Conner Trinneer, Scott Bakula and LeVar Burton

The guest cast in "First Flight" included the return of Vaughn Armstrong in the recurring role of Admiral Forrest, although this was his most demanding shoot so far, requiring him to be on set for five of the seven days of filming. Keith Carradine was cast as A. G. Robinson. This episode also saw the return of some actors who had appeared in other series of the Star Trek franchise. These included Michael Canavan, who appeared in this episode as a Vulcan advisor, but previously appeared in the Star Trek: Deep Space Nine episode "Defiant" as a member of the Maquis terrorist group. Also appearing in "First Flight" was Victor Bevine. He had previously appeared in DS9, Voyager and the movie Star Trek: First Contact.

"First Flight" also provided the stage for an exchange with the United States Navy aircraft carrier USS Enterprise (CVN-65). Three crew members of the real-life Enterprise had been voted as "Sailors of the Year" by the U.S. Navy, and so were given the roles of extras in this episode. This was not the first time such an exchange had occurred; previous winners had appeared as crew members on board the fictional Enterprise in the episode "Desert Crossing". This time around they were given roles at the NX Command Center instead. Aviation Maintenance Administrationman 2nd Class James D. Frey portrayed a technician, Navy Counselor 1st Class Kathleen J. Grant played a Senator and Hospital Corpsman 3rd Class Thomas P. Hunt was the Senator's assistant. All three were pleased to be appearing on the show, with Grant saying that "My nephew told all of the kids at his school his aunt was going to be on Star Trek. That makes the experience even more of a thrill for me", and Hunt saying "This will be on reruns for years to come, when I'm 60, I'll be able to say, 'Hey, that's me on Enterprise.'". In return, the three sailors presented the cast and crew of Star Trek: Enterprise with a flag that had been flying on the aircraft carrier earlier in the month.

== Reception ==
"First Flight" was first shown in the United States on May 14, 2003 on UPN. It was aired on the same night as the following episode, "Bounty". Both episodes saw a reduction in viewing figures compared to previous weeks, which was attributed to them being broadcast at the same time as the series finale of Dawson's Creek on The WB. "First Flight" received a 2.4/4% share among adults between the ages of 18 and 49. This means that it was seen by 2.4 percent of all 18- to 49-year-olds, and 4 percent of all 18- to 49-year-olds watching television at the time of the broadcast. It was the second lowest rating received by the series at that point, and "Bounty" received a slightly decreased rating of 2.3/4%, but the viewing figures were higher. "Bounty" was watched by 3.54 million viewers, whereas "First Flight" was watched by 3.3 million. "First Flight" was the 93rd most watched programme of the evening. The episode aired during the following week was the season two finale, whose figures rebounded slightly; "The Expanse" had a final rating of 2.8/4% with an audience of 3.88 million.

Michelle Erica Green reviewed the episode for TrekNation, and thought that Scott Bakula in particular gave one of his best performances of the show so far. Both he and Carradine worked well together, but thought that the other characters in the flashback were clichéd. Overall, she thought it was a "superbly filmed episode" with several new sets which were well used, and the visual effects were good. Jamahl Epsicokhan at his website "Jammer's Reviews" gave the episode a score of three out of four, saying that he welcomed the back story to the series being fleshed out in this episode. He thought that the episode itself wasn't very challenging to watch, but thought that the melancholy ending was fitting. He even thought that it might be worthwhile to go further back in time to see the actual founding of Starfleet. In his 2022 rewatch, Keith DeCandido of Tor.com gave it 4 out of 10.

Den of Geek ranked this the ninth best episode of this television series. The Digital Fix called it a "surprising charming episode" that helped provide context for the Enterprise's mission, but that it should have come in season one.

== Home media release ==
"First Flight" was first released for home media use on DVD as part of the second series box set of Star Trek: Enterprise. The release featured text commentary on the episode from Star Trek and NASA designers Michael and Denise Okuda. The episode also featured as one of the three Enterprise episodes on the Star Trek Fan Collective DVD Set "Captain's Log". The set featured episodes selected by each of the Captains from the Star Trek series, and several chosen by the fans, a total of seventeen episodes. A release on Blu-ray Disc for season two occurred on August 20, 2013.
