= Star Trek: Enterprise season 2 =

Season of television series

Star Trek: Enterprise
- Season 2
- DVD and Blu-ray cover
- No. of episodes: 26

Release
- Original network: UPN
- Original release: September 18, 2002 – May 21, 2003

Season chronology
- ← Previous; Season 1 Next → Season 3

The second season of the American science fiction television series Star Trek: Enterprise (Note: The series was referred to as Enterprise at the time of airing.) commenced airing on UPN in the United States on September 18, 2002 and concluded on May 21, 2003 after 26 episodes. Set in the 22nd century, the series follows the adventures of the first Starfleet starship Enterprise, registration NX-01. The second season saw the series continue a concentration on stand-alone episodes as seen in the debut season, but the decision was made to start an ongoing story arc to run into the third season with the second season finale episode "The Expanse". The second season also saw the return of executive producer Rick Berman to writing duties after he had been working on the film Star Trek: Nemesis.

The season continued the Temporal Cold War story arc with the opening episode "Shockwave" (part two), and the producers sought to include further appearances by the Andorians and the Vulcans. It also introduced the Romulans in their earliest appearance in the Star Trek timeline with the episode "Minefield", and the Borg made an appearance in the series in "Regeneration". Berman and Brannon Braga sought to bring Patrick Stewart in to direct an episode of Enterprise, and it was also suggested that either he or Whoopi Goldberg could appear on-screen as their Star Trek: The Next Generation characters. Berman also said he was open to an appearance by William Shatner.

According to the Nielsen Ratings received for the episodes, the season stayed steady above four percent with the exception of two dips below that level. One of these dips included the episode "Horizon", which with its 2.2 percent rating, was the lowest viewed episode of the series at that point. The critical reception to the second season was mixed, with one reviewer stating that the series did not learn from the mistakes of the first season and another calling it childish for the lack of consequences being seen in the episodes. However, the introduction of the ongoing story-line in the season finale was met with praise. The series was nominated for five Emmy Awards, four Saturn Awards and two Hugo Awards but did not win in any categories.

== Plot overview ==
The second season continues the Human exploration of interstellar space by the crew of Enterprise, and further mention is made of the Temporal Cold War. The early encounters and historic culture of familiar Star Trek franchise races, such as the Vulcans, Andorians, Klingons, Romulans, Tholians, Borg, and Tellarites, are also explored further. The season ends with a cliffhanger that sets up the Xindi story arc, set in the Delphic Expanse, of the third season.

== Cast ==
=== Main cast ===
- Scott Bakula as Captain Jonathan Archer
- Jolene Blalock as Sub-Commander T'Pol
- Connor Trinneer as Commander Charles "Trip" Tucker III
- Dominic Keating as Lieutenant Malcolm Reed
- Linda Park as Ensign Hoshi Sato
- Anthony Montgomery as Ensign Travis Mayweather
- John Billingsley as Doctor Phlox

=== Recurring cast ===
- Vaughn Armstrong as Admiral Maxwell Forrest (6 episodes) and Kreetassan Captain (1 episode)
- Gary Graham as Ambassador Soval (3 episodes)
- John Fleck as Silik (2 episodes)
- Daniel Riordan as Duras (2 episodes)
- Jeffrey Combs as Commander Shran (1 episode)
- Matt Winston as Temporal Agent Daniels (1 episode)

== Episodes ==
In the following table, episodes are listed by the order in which they aired.

No. overall	No. in season	Title	In-universe date	Directed by	Written by	Original release date	Prod. code	U.S. viewers (millions)
27	1	"Shockwave: Part 2"	Unknown	Allan Kroeker	Rick Berman & Brannon Braga	September 18, 2002	40358-028	4.89
As a group of Suliban take over Enterprise, Captain Archer tries to return to the 22nd century.
28	2	"Carbon Creek"	April 12, 2152	James A. Contner	S : Rick Berman & Brannon Braga & Dan O'Shannon; T : Chris Black	September 25, 2002	40358-027	4.84
Sub-Commander T'Pol relates the tale of a Vulcan crew stranded on Earth in the 1950s.
29	3	"Minefield"	Unknown	James A. Contner	John Shiban	October 2, 2002	40358-029	5.25
Enterprise snags a cloaked mine and Lieutenant Reed and Captain Archer race to disable it during first contact with the Romulan Star Empire.
30	4	"Dead Stop"	Unknown	Roxann Dawson	Mike Sussman & Phyllis Strong	October 9, 2002	40358-031	5.41
Heavily damaged by the Romulan mine, Enterprise is repaired by an unmanned and automated sentient alien repair station.
31	5	"A Night in Sickbay"	Unknown	David Straiton	Rick Berman & Brannon Braga	October 16, 2002	40358-030	6.25
The Captain's beagle, Porthos, becomes ill from an alien pathogen, and Captain Archer frets in Sickbay waiting for him to recover.
32	6	"Marauders"	Unknown	Mike Vejar	S : Rick Berman & Brannon Braga; T : David Wilcox	October 30, 2002	40358-032	5.60
Captain Archer barters for deuterium from a mining colony plagued by Klingon marauders, who are seeking deuterium as well.
33	7	"The Seventh"	Unknown	David Livingston	Rick Berman & Brannon Braga	November 6, 2002	40358-033	4.82
Sub-Commander T'Pol is reactivated as a Vulcan intelligence agent, reawakening a dark secret from her past.
34	8	"The Communicator"	Unknown	James A. Contner	S : Rick Berman & Brannon Braga; T : André Bormanis	November 13, 2002	40358-034	4.46
After an away mission, Lieutenant Reed discovers that his communicator was lost on a pre-warp planet; he and Captain Archer are then captured trying to retrieve it.
35	9	"Singularity"	August 14, 2152	Patrick Norris	Chris Black	November 20, 2002	40358-035	4.83
Enterprise charts a course through a trinary star system to investigate a black hole, and the crew find themselves suffering from a condition similar to OCD.
36	10	"Vanishing Point"	Unknown	David Straiton	Rick Berman & Brannon Braga	November 27, 2002	40358-036	3.78
After her first trip through the transporter, Ensign Sato finds herself becoming incorporeal, with the crew believing she has perished.
37	11	"Precious Cargo"	September 12, 2152	David Livingston	S : Rick Berman & Brannon Braga; T : David A. Goodman	December 11, 2002	40358-037	4.67
While answering a distress call, Commander Tucker is kidnapped along with a demanding alien princess.
38	12	"The Catwalk"	September 18, 2152	Mike Vejar	Mike Sussman & Phyllis Strong	December 18, 2002	40358-038	4.73
The Enterprise crew takes refuge inside one of the warp nacelles to avoid an inescapable radiation belt.
39	13	"Dawn"	Unknown	Roxann Dawson	John Shiban	January 8, 2003	40358-039	3.99
Commander Tucker is fired upon by an Arkonian ship and is then stranded on a planet with his attacker.
40	14	"Stigma"	Unknown	David Livingston	Rick Berman & Brannon Braga	February 5, 2003	40358-040	4.40
Sub-Commander T'Pol learns she has Pa'nar Syndrome, contracted from her mind meld in "Fusion", and faces being ostracized by Vulcan society.
41	15	"Cease Fire"	Unknown	David Straiton	Chris Black	February 12, 2003	40358-041	4.78
Captain Archer negotiates a cease fire between the Andorians and the Vulcans.
42	16	"Future Tense"	Unknown	James Whitmore Jr.	Mike Sussman & Phyllis Strong	February 19, 2003	40358-042	4.62
Enterprise finds a derelict ship, only to be attacked by both Suliban and Tholian ships.
43	17	"Canamar"	Unknown	Allan Kroeker	John Shiban	February 26, 2003	40358-043	4.10
Mistaken as smugglers, Captain Archer and Commander Tucker find themselves on a prisoner transport ship.
44	18	"The Crossing"	Unknown	David Livingston	S : André Bormanis; S/T : Rick Berman & Brannon Braga	April 2, 2003	40358-044	3.85
Incorporeal aliens attempt to take over Enterprise.
45	19	"Judgment"	Unknown	James L. Conway	S : Taylor Elmore; S/T : David A. Goodman	April 9, 2003	40358-045	3.69
Captain Archer is arrested and imprisoned by the Klingons for allegedly conspiring against the Empire.
46	20	"Horizon"	January 10, 2153	James A. Contner	André Bormanis	April 16, 2003	40358-046	3.36
After the death of his father, Ensign Mayweather visits his family on their cargo ship and begins to reconsider his place aboard Enterprise.
47	21	"The Breach"	Unknown	Robert Duncan McNeill	S : Daniel McCarthy; T : Chris Black & John Shiban	April 23, 2003	40358-047	3.19
Due to the demands of a militant faction, Enterprise is asked to retrieve Denobulan geologists from an alien cave. Dr. Phlox must treat a patient with racist views against his people.
48	22	"Cogenitor"	Unknown	LeVar Burton	Rick Berman & Brannon Braga	April 30, 2003	40358-048	4.08
Enterprise encounters the Vissians and Commander Tucker finds himself troubled by the fact the Vissians are a three-sexed species.
49	23	"Regeneration"	March 1, 2153	David Livingston	Mike Sussman & Phyllis Strong	May 7, 2003	40358-049	4.12
A group of Borg (from Star Trek: First Contact) are revived after a century frozen in the Arctic ice.
50	24	"First Flight"	Unknown	LeVar Burton	John Shiban & Chris Black	May 14, 2003	40358-050	3.30
Upon the death of a close friend, Captain Archer tells Sub-Commander T'Pol about his early career as an experimental warp engine pilot.
51	25	"Bounty"	March 21, 2153	Roxann Dawson	S : Rick Berman & Brannon Braga; T : Hans Tobeason and Mike Sussman & Phyllis Strong	May 14, 2003	40358-051	3.54
A Tellarite captures Captain Archer in order to collect a reward from the Klingons who have been searching for him since the events of "Judgment".
52	26	"The Expanse"	April 24, 2153	Allan Kroeker	Rick Berman & Brannon Braga	May 21, 2003	40358-052	3.88
After an alien attack on Earth, Enterprise is refitted before being sent into the Delphic Expanse. Sub-Commander T'Pol resigns her commission with the Vulcan High Command, and Commander Tucker is troubled by the death of his sister.

== Production ==
Production on the second season of Enterprise began on June 24, 2002, on a location shoot for the second episode of the season, "Carbon Creek". Once production on that episode was complete, the crew moved onto the second part of "Shockwave", which would be broadcast first. It was produced in that order as "Carbon Creek" only required Scott Bakula, Connor Trinneer and Jolene Blalock from the main cast to appear. The remaining cast returned on July 10, for the first day of production for the second half of "Shockwave".

Executive producer Rick Berman was looking forward to resuming writing with Brannon Braga on episodes of Enterprise as he had been previously busy with work on the film Star Trek: Nemesis. He was also in talks to bring Patrick Stewart in to direct an episode of the series, saying that the pair had discussed this and Stewart was interested but was busy at the time filming X2 in Canada. He added that once Stewart had a few weeks spare in his schedule, that they would see if he could be brought in to direct an episode.

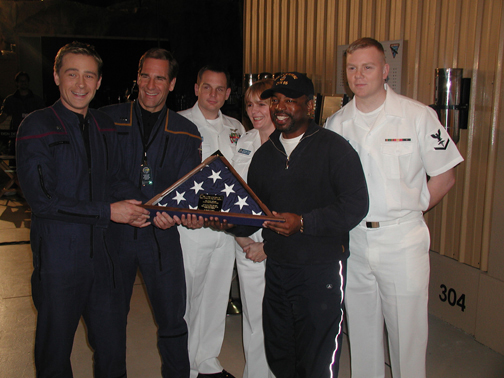
Three crew members of the U.S. Navy aircraft carrier Enterprise present a flag to Conner Trinneer, Scott Bakula and LeVar Burton on the set of "First Flight".

Two other Star Trek alumni returned to Enterprise to direct. These were Roxann Dawson and LeVar Burton. Dawson had previously played B'Elanna Torres on Star Trek: Voyager, and had directed the episodes "The Andorian Incident" and "Vox Sola" during the first season of Enterprise as well as two episodes of Voyager. She said that after a season of working together, the cast of Enterprise were finding their characters "beautifully".

Burton had played Geordi La Forge in Star Trek: The Next Generation, before moving into directing with the 100th episode of Voyager, "Timeless". He had directed two episodes of Enterprise during the first season, and filmed a further two during the second season including "First Flight". This episode was the 50th episode of the series and featured guest appearances from three members of the crew of the United States Navy aircraft carrier USS Enterprise (CVN-65).

There were several links in promotion between Star Trek: Nemesis and Enterprise, as season two saw Enterprise form half of a two-hour block called "Out of This World Wednesdays on UPN", with a new series of The Twilight Zone forming the second half. This promotion had a Nemesis competition tied into it, offering the chance for five winners to take a trip to Los Angeles to attend the premiere of the film. Another competition linked Nemesis back to Enterprise, with participating Loews Cinemas offering the chance to win a walk-on role on the series.

== Themes ==
Brannon Braga said that the production team sought to increase the tempo of season two compared to the first season. He said at a press junket held by the Television Critics Association in July 2002 that "We're just starting. We want to capitalise more on the fact that [Enterprise] is a sequel. We want to have a season that maybe has more action in it than it had last season." He predicted that possible storylines would include Jonathan Archer fulfilling more of his potential as Captain of the Enterprise, as well as further installments in the Temporal Cold War story-arc and further interactions between the crew and both the Andorians and the Vulcans.

Braga said that they wanted to avoid overloading the Temporal Cold War but instead they wanted to create an ongoing element to the series during season two. He expected that it would feature in the first episode of the season, "Shockwave" (part two), but then there would be a break before it was featured again. He also revealed that the recurring character of Daniels wasn't entirely human, and that this would be revealed during the second season while at a panel discussion at the Official Star Trek Convention in Las Vegas in August 2002. Berman, said that the revelation of who was controlling the Suliban would not be shown during the second season, but he promised a "really good" season and was open to William Shatner appearing in the show. Scott Bakula also referred to a previous discussion with Berman where the producer suggested that Patrick Stewart or Whoopi Goldberg could appear on-screen in the second season through the means of time travel from their time on Star Trek: The Next Generation.

Perhaps the biggest announcement made prior to the start of the season was the return of the Romulans to Star Trek. They had not previously been seen on Enterprise, and Braga was well aware that they would have to carefully consider the continuity as the crew of James T. Kirk's Enterprise were the first to see a Romulan in the episode "Balance of Terror". He said "The continuity is airtight. Believe me. We know. We know...". The species were due to make their first appearance in the Star Trek timeline in the episode "Minefield", which was written by former The X-Files writer John Shiban. At the same time that the Romulans were due to appear in Enterprise, work was underway on the Romulan-centric film, Star Trek: Nemesis. The second season also saw an appearance by the Borg in the episode "Regeneration", which was intended to follow up on the events in Star Trek: First Contact.

== Reception ==
=== Ratings ===
The season opened with Nielsen ratings of 4.9/8 percent for "Shockwave" (part two). This means that it was seen by 4.9 percent of all 18- to 49-year-olds, and 8 percent of all 18- to 49-year-olds watching television at the time of the broadcast. The ratings received for the season rose over the next few episodes to 5.4/8 percent for "Dead Stop" - the most watched episode of the season. "Vanishing Point" was the first episode of the season to drop below a 4 percent rating, but not the last as "Judgment", "The Breach" and "Horizon" also received ratings below the season average. The ratings received by "Horizon" of 2.2 percent were a series low at that point. But the ratings increased following that trio of episodes, and the season ended with "The Expanse" receiving ratings of 4.4/7 percent. Overall, season 2 was part of the show's long-term decline in ratings, with both the last episode to be seen by more than 5 million people and the first to be seen by fewer than 4 million.

=== Critical response ===
At the time of the broadcast of the final episode of the season, Scott D. Pierce for the Deseret News described Enterprise as not "an awful show, it's just, well, boring." He called the new story arc introduced in "The Expanse" a "promising idea". But also added, "it's pretty hard to get your hopes up too high for Enterprise."

Holly Ordway had said that the second season sought to be more realistic, but that it feels childish as no one gets hurt or killed - even in the episode "Marauders" which saw a group of colonists defend themselves from renegade Klingons. She called the finale a "giant reset button" on the series, adding that it seemed that the show was about to become a sequel to Voyager but squandering the premise it had been given.

James Hunt at the website Den of Geek placed three second season episodes in his top ten list of Enterprise. In ninth place, "First Flight" was chosen as it demonstrated that Jonathan Archer was "the most Kirk-esque Captain since the original". "Regeneration" was placed in third position, while "Carbon Creek" was the runner-up for the best episode because it was an early episode in which the series found its feet.

Randy Miller III, in his review of the Blu-ray release of the second season for DVD Talk, said that the memory of this season was worse than it actually was. He criticized the studio's insistence at stand-alone episodes but said that there was a marked improvement about halfway through the season, calling the finale "game-changing". He added that at the time of the DVD release, he did not feel so positively towards the season and agreed with Ordway's opinion at the time. Michael Simpson, while writing for SciFiNow, suggested that the second season of Enterprise "suggests a fatal failure to recognize what went wrong" with the first season. He said that the inclusion of the Borg in the episode "Regeneration" lacked fresh ideas as a similar idea had previously appeared in season one with the Ferengi making first contact but not being named in "Acquisition". He was frustrated with the season due to the "unfulfilled potential", and praised episodes such as "Carbon Creek", "Singularity" and "Cogenitor".

CBR rated Season 2 of Star Trek: Enterprise as the 14th best season of all 31 seasons of Star Trek up to that time.

=== Awards ===
Enterprise received five nominations in three categories at the 55th Primetime Emmy Awards. Three of these were in the "Outstanding Special Visual Effects For A Series" category; "Dead Stop", "The Crossing" and "The Expanse". The series had won that category at the 54th Emmy Awards, for the pilot "Broken Bow". Michael Westmore's team was nominated for "Outstanding Makeup For A Series (Prosthetic)" for their work on the episode "Canamar" and Dennis McCarthy musical score for "The Expanse" was nominated for "Outstanding Music Composition For A Series (Dramatic Underscore)".

Both "Carbon Creek" and "A Night in Sickbay" were nominated at the 2003 Hugo Awards for "Best Dramatic Presentation, Short Form", but lost to "Conversations with Dead People" – an episode of Buffy the Vampire Slayer. At the 29th Saturn Awards, the series was nominated for "Best Network Television Series" and Scott Bakula, Jolene Blalock and Connor Trinneer were nominated for "Best Actor on Television", "Best Supporting Actress on Television" and "Best Supporting Actor on Television", respectively. However, the series did not win any of the awards it was nominated for.

== Media information ==
As part of the releases of Enterprise on Blu-ray announced in early 2013, a box set featuring the episodes of the second season was released on August 19 in the United Kingdom and a day later in the United States and Canada.

Star Trek: Enterprise – Season 2
Set details		Special features	
26 episodes; 7-disc set; 1:85:1 aspect ratio; Subtitles: Danish, Dutch, English, English for the hearing impaired, French, German, Italian, Norwegian, Spanish, Swedish; Audio: English (Dolby Digital 5.1 and 2.0 Surround), French, German and Italian and Spanish (Dolby Digital 2.0 Surround)		DVD and Blu-ray: Enterprise Moments: Season 2; Enterprise Profile: Jolene Blalock; LeVar Burton: Star Trek Director; Enterprise Secrets; Inside "A Night in Sickbay"; Outtakes; Audio Commentary: "Dead Stop" and "Regeneration"; Text Commentary: "Stigma" and "First Flight"; Deleted scenes: "Minefield", "A Night in Sickbay", "Stigma" and "The Expanse"; Blu-Ray: In Conversation: The First Crew (HD); Uncharted Territory: Part One: Destination Unknown (HD); Uncharted Territory: Part Two: First Crew (HD); Uncharted Territory: Part Three: Course Correction (HD)	
Release dates
DVD		Blu-ray	
Region 1	Region 2	United States (Region free)	United Kingdom (Region free)
July 26, 2005	July 11, 2005	August 20, 2013	August 19, 2013
