= Rura Penthe =

Rura Penthe is the name of a fictional penal colony in the following works:

- A penal colony island in the 1954 Disney film 20,000 Leagues Under the Sea
- A Klingon penal planetoid in the Star Trek universe, featured in:
  - The 1991 feature film Star Trek VI: The Undiscovered Country
  - Two 2003 episodes of Star Trek: Enterprise
    - "Judgment" (Star Trek: Enterprise)
    - "Bounty" (Star Trek: Enterprise),
  - A deleted scene from the 2009 feature film Star Trek
