= Marauders (Star Trek: Enterprise) =

- Star Trek: Enterprise episode
- Episode no.: Season 2 Episode 6
- Directed by: Mike Vejar
- Story by: Rick Berman; Brannon Braga
- Teleplay by: David Wilcox
- Production code: 206
- Original air date: October 30, 2002

Guest appearances
- Larry Cedar - Tessic; Steven Flynn - Maklii; Bari Hochwald - E'Lis; Jesse James Rutherford - Q'Ell; Robertson Dean - Klingon Captain Korok; Wayne King, Jr. - Klingon #1; Peewee Piemonte - Klingon #2; Vince Deadrick Jr. - Klingon #3

Episode chronology
← Previous "A Night in Sickbay"	Next → "The Seventh"
- Star Trek: Enterprise season 2

"Marauders" is the sixth episode of the second season of the American science fiction television series Star Trek: Enterprise, the 32nd episode overall. It first aired on October 30, 2002, on UPN within the United States. The story was created by executive producers Rick Berman and Brannon Braga with a teleplay by David Wilcox. A similar premise had been included in the original pitch for Star Trek by Gene Roddenberry.

Set in the 22nd century, the series follows the adventures of the first Starfleet starship Enterprise, registration NX-01. In this episode, while in search of deuterium, Enterprise discovers a mining colony that is being controlled by Klingons who are bullying the inhabitants and hoarding their supplies. The crew conduct repairs on the colony and train the colonists to fight off the Klingons.

This episode was mostly filmed on location in a quarry in Ventura County, California, and the majority of the guest stars were stunt performers. Both Larry Cedar and Bari Hochwald had previously appeared in different episodes of Deep Space Nine and Voyager. "Marauders" was watched by 5.6 million viewers, the second highest audience for an episode of the second season. Reviews were mixed, with some critics responding negatively to the lack of consequences from the fight sequences, while another praised the characters interactions, and felt that it was a good example of the western genre.

== Plot ==
Captain Jonathan Archer (Scott Bakula), Sub-Commander T'Pol (Jolene Blalock) and Commander Charles "Trip" Tucker III (Connor Trinneer) fly down to a small colony of 76 miners in order to trade for deuterium. They initially try to barter with Tessic (Larry Cedar), the colony's leader, but he appears reluctant to part with any of the 80,000 liters in inventory, which is being held for 'someone else'. After negotiations, a deal is struck − 200 liters of deuterium for four power cells and whatever medical supplies Enterprise can spare, on the proviso that the Enterprise crew can fix two offline pumps in two days.

Despite deuterium being a valuable commodity, Archer is startled by the lack of basic medical supplies and the run-down nature of the colony. The reason becomes apparent when seven Klingons show up to collect deuterium according to their 'regular arrangement'. When Tessic informs Korok (Robertson Dean), the leader of the Klingons, that they do not have all the deuterium because two pumps were not working, Korok hits him and gives them four days to meet the order. Later, when Tucker and Archer attempt to talk them into fighting against the Klingons, Tessic tells them to take their 200 liters and leave. Leaving does not sit well with Archer and he convinces the leader to resist with their support.

On Enterprise, T'Pol teaches some of the colonists how to evade edged-weapon attacks (from Vulcan martial-art 'Suus-mahna'), while Ensign Hoshi Sato (Linda Park) and Lieutenant Malcolm Reed (Dominic Keating) teach other colonists how to fire their weapons more accurately. Archer and Tucker then suggest the colonists shift the entire colony to the south 50 meters. When the Klingon marauders arrive, the colony appears deserted and silent. Finally the defenders show themselves, and in the ensuing fight the Klingons are lured into an area surrounded by the capped-off deuterium well heads. On cue, the wells are ignited, surrounding the Klingons with flames. Tessic then tells the Klingons to leave and never come back. After they depart, Archer is rewarded with 2,000 liters of deuterium by the grateful miners.

== Production ==
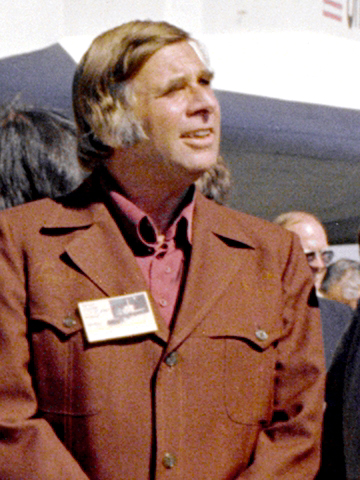
Gene Roddenberry's original pitch for Star Trek featured a similar premise called "Kentucky, Kentucky".

The initial pitch for Star Trek by Gene Roddenberry included a similar episode premise called "Kentucky, Kentucky". This story would have had Captain Robert M. April and the crew of the S.S. Yorktown visit a human colony which had been previously attacked by Viking-like aliens. This resulted in the colonists reverting in appearance to that seen during the American frontier-era. April and his crew band together to help the colonists fight off the aliens.

Executive producers Rick Berman and Brannon Braga developed the story, which was turned into a teleplay by David Wilcox. It was directed by Mike Vejar, his fourth episode of the series, although he had also developed several more episodes of the other series in the franchise. Filming on "Marauders" began on August 21, 2002, utilising the standing ship sets. The shoot on the following day mostly took place on a sound stage, while the third day's on set filming used the shuttlepod set as well as a newly created ship's gym set. The remainder of the eight days filming took place on location at a quarry in Ventura County, California, located about an hour's journey north west of Los Angeles. Temperatures were mild for that time of year, but the actors were still told to wear sunscreen and drink plenty of water. The actors portraying the Klingons joined on the second of the five days on location, with the majority of them played by stunt men. According to Bakula, the set used for the colony was the largest built so far for Enterprise.

Robertson Dean played the sole speaking Klingon, he had previously appeared in the Star Trek: The Next Generation episode "Face of the Enemy". Other members of the guest cast included Cedar, portraying the colonist Tessic, who had previously appeared in individual episodes of both Star Trek: Deep Space Nine and Voyager. Likewise, Bari Hochwald also appeared in those two series. While appearing in "Marauders", she was also performing in the play Fedunn at the Odyssey Theatre in Los Angeles.

== Reception ==
"Marauders" was first broadcast on the UPN within the United States on October 30, 2002. It was watched by 5.6 million viewers, equating to Nielsen ratings of 3.6/6 percent. This meant that the episode was watched by 3.6 percent of possible viewers, and 6% of those watching television at the time. This was the second most watched episode of the season, behind "A Night in Sickbay", which was broadcast a week prior.

J.C. Maçek III, writing for PopMatters, described "Marauders" as forming the first part of a loose trilogy of episodes within the second season focusing on re-introducing the Klingons to the series. The following episodes in the group were said to be "Judgment" and "Bounty". Jamahl Epsicokhan at his website Jammer's Reviews gave the episode two out of four, said that there was nothing exciting in "Marauders", and that the action sequences towards the end were unrealistic because despite all the apparent violence, not a single person even gets injured during the scene. He called the general premise "classic Trek", but that it lacked depth and didn't pose any interesting questions. He summed it up by saying it was "a bloodless, light-as-a-feather action show with handsome production values but absolutely and positively no edge."

Michelle Erica Green, reviewing the episode for TrekNation, said that the episode seemed to follow the same story as the 1998 animated film A Bug's Life, but was very much set in the western genre which inspired Roddenberry's original Star Trek pitch, with other comparisons to the 1960 film The Magnificent Seven. She felt that there was several scenes which enabled some character building moments for Hoshi, Travis Mayweather and Tucker, and described it overall as "a decent genre piece with good character work". In his 2022 rewatch, Keith DeCandido of Tor.com gave it five out of ten.

The Digital Fix noted this as an example of using the Klingons to provide a recognizable villain for the episode.

== Home media ==
The first home media release of "Marauders" was part of the season two DVD box set, released in the United States on August 7, 2005. A release on Blu-ray Disc for season two occurred on August 20, 2013.

== See also ==
- "The Magnificent Ferengi" - an episode of Star Trek: Deep Space Nine based on a similar premise
