= Precious Cargo =

Precious Cargo may refer to:

- Precious Cargo (film), a 2016 Canadian action film directed by Max Adams
- "Precious Cargo" (Star Trek: Enterprise), a 2002 episode of the American science fiction television series Star Trek: Enterprise
- Precious Cargo, a 1990 album by High Tide
- "Precious Cargo", a track on the 2009 film score Transformers: Revenge of the Fallen – The Score
