= Regeneration (Star Trek: Enterprise) =

- Star Trek: Enterprise episode
- Episode no.: Season 2 Episode 23
- Directed by: David Livingston
- Written by: Mike Sussman; Phyllis Strong
- Editing by: Daryl Baskin
- Production code: 223
- Original air date: May 7, 2003

Guest appearances
- Vaughn Armstrong as Admiral Forrest; Jim Fitzpatrick as Commander Williams; Chris Wynne as Doctor Monger; Bonita Friedericy as Rooney; John Short as Drake; Paul Scott as Lt. Foster

Episode chronology
← Previous "Cogenitor"	Next → "First Flight"
- Star Trek: Enterprise season 2

"Regeneration" is the forty-ninth episode of the American science fiction television series Star Trek: Enterprise, the twenty-third episode of the second season. It first aired on May 7, 2003, on UPN in the United States. The episode was written by Mike Sussman and Phyllis Strong, and was directed by David Livingston. It was a follow-up to the feature film Star Trek: First Contact.

Set in the 22nd century, the series follows the adventures of the starship Enterprise, registration NX-01. In this episode, a research team in the Arctic inadvertently triggers the reanimation of several cybernetically enhanced aliens, killed in an apparent spacecraft crash over a hundred years earlier. The aliens assimilate the researchers before escaping into space. The Enterprise pursues the ship and is attacked, forcing Archer to destroy the vessel. Afterwards they discover that the aliens sent a message into the Delta Quadrant containing the coordinates of Earth, a message that will not arrive until the 24th century.

The episode used props and costumes from previous Star Trek series in order to represent the Borg. The guest cast included Bonita Friedericy, the wife of main cast member John Billingsley. The ratings received by the episode were similar to those received during the previous week, and the number of viewers were one of the highest for the year. The critical response to "Regeneration" was mixed, with concerns directed at potential continuity problems, and that the appearance of the Borg was a little obvious. A follow-up episode to "Regeneration" was pitched for the fifth season of Star Trek: Enterprise but the show was cancelled at the end of the fourth season.

== Plot ==
A team of researchers discover remains of a crashed spaceship in the Arctic Circle, finding two humanoids with cybernetic implants frozen in the wreckage. The bodies are taken to a nearby compound to be studied. The scientists marvel at the nanoprobes that begin to repair the long dead aliens. One of the seemingly dead subjects attacks the scientists, assimilating them. Using scavenged parts from the wreckage of the Borg ship to enhance the transport, they escape into space, upgrading it with a faster warp drive and weapons.

Admiral Forrest orders Enterprise to rescue the "kidnapped" researchers. They soon receive a distress call from a Tarkalean freighter, and they arrive to discover the ship under attack from the enhanced transport. Captain Jonathan Archer tries to disable their weapons, but the ship jumps to warp speed. Archer brings the survivors to Sickbay, and finds their situation reminiscent of a Zefram Cochrane story he remembers (relating to First Contact). The assimilated Tarkalean crew soon awaken, and in the ensuing melee Doctor Phlox is infected with nanoprobes. They escape, and Lieutenant Reed then finds them modifying ship's systems, and learns that the Enterprise's phase pistols are ineffective against them. Archer, left with no other options, orders the section to be de-pressurized, and vents the Tarkaleans into space. Reed then begins upgrading the pistols, while Phlox treats himself with "omicron radiation" to destroy the nanoprobes.

Enterprise again catches up with the transport, but the recent modifications suddenly activate and shut down weapons and propulsion. Soon after the aliens hail Enterprise and demand that they surrender, noting that "resistance is futile". In response, Archer and Reed board the ship with upgraded pistols, plant explosives, and beam out. Commander Tucker troubleshoots the alien modifications thereby restoring main power to Enterprise. With the transport crippled, Archer realizes the altered crew members are too far gone and orders the transport's destruction. Later, a recovering Phlox informs Archer that while infected he kept hearing a repeating numerical sequence - Earth's coordinates sent somewhere into the Delta Quadrant. Sub-Commander T'Pol states it would take almost 200 years to reach its destination, but Archer remains troubled, concerned that they might only have postponed an eventual invasion.

== Production ==
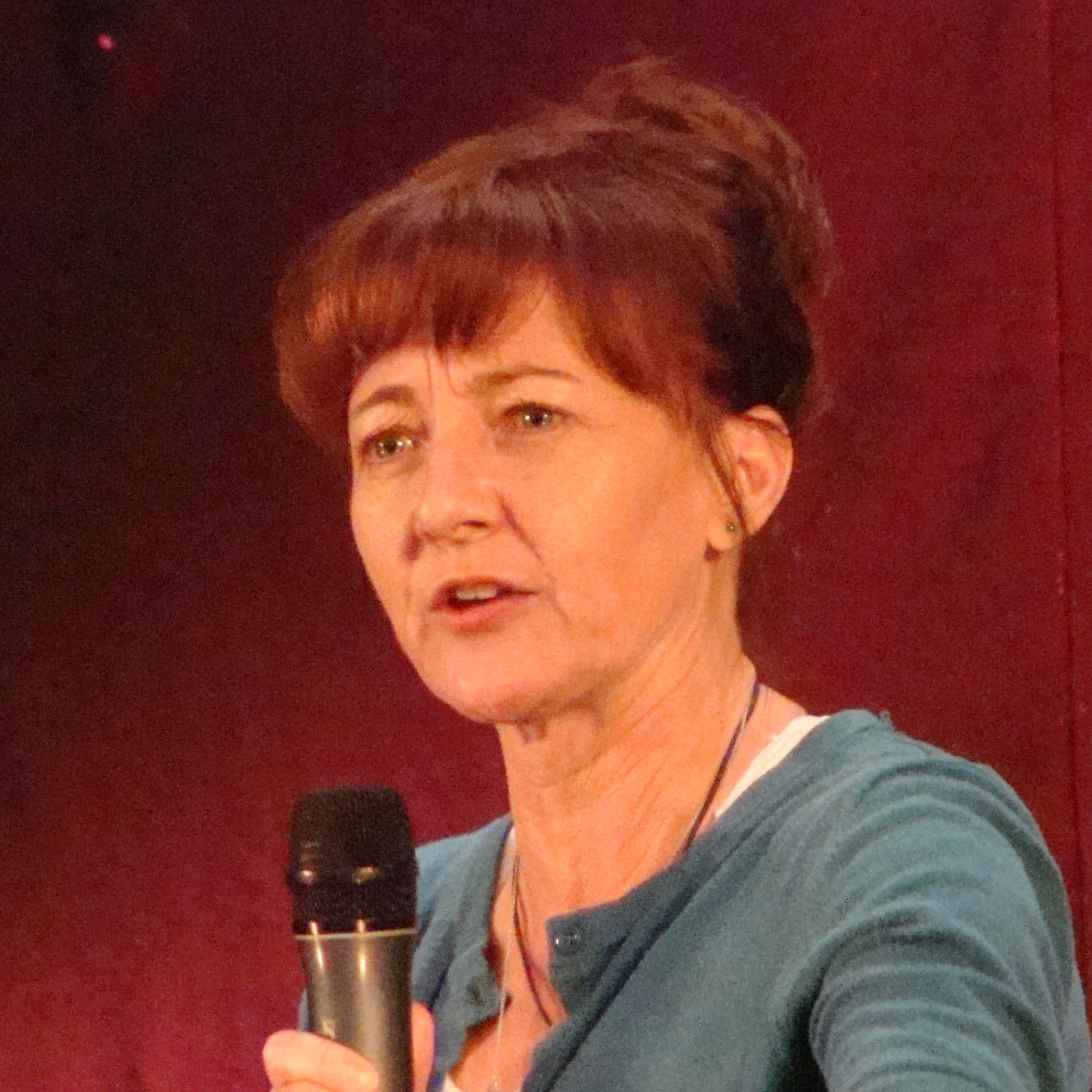
Bonita Friedericy guest starred as Rooney, and is married to John Billingsley who plays Doctor Phlox

Principal photography took place between February 27, 2003, and March 8. The B unit shoot for the episode was not completed until March 11. This coincided with the commencement of filming on the following episode, "First Flight". The Borg in the episode were all played by stuntmen who had previously worked on Enterprise, with four main "Stunt Borg" and four additional Borg for background shots. Bonita Friedericy was cast as Rooney, one of the researchers that discovered the aliens. Friedericy got the audition through her agent, director David Livingston and the casting assistant did not know that she was married to Billingsley, and producers Rick Berman and Brannon Braga did not let on that they had met her before. Friedericy did not share any scenes in the episode with her husband or film on the same days. Billingsley had suggested at one point during the filming of Enterprise that Friedericy should play all of his in-character wives. Director David Livingston is one of the more prolific Star Trek directors, and directed two other episodes in season two of Enterprise alone, "Stigma" and "The Crossing". The Borg make-up applied to Billingsley slowed down production, as there was discussion on set regarding how far the assimilation process on the character should progress.

"Regeneration" was intended to follow up on the events depicted in film Star Trek: First Contact which features a Borg sphere being destroyed whilst in orbit of 21st century Earth. Executive producer Brannon Braga initially refused to feature the Borg in Enterprise, calling it a "cheap trick". He agreed for them to appear when the premise for "Regeneration" was suggested, saying that "it was such a great concept I couldn’t resist it". The set pieces and costumes for the Borg were reused from earlier Star Trek productions, and had not been used since the series finale of Star Trek: Voyager, "Endgame". The Borg costume worn by Friedericy had been previously used by Roxann Dawson in the episode "Unimatrix Zero". For the sequence where the Borg debris is discovered, several other pieces of sets were re-purposed to act as debris. This included part of the saucer section of the USS Enterprise (NCC-1701-E), which first appeared in First Contact. Brian Tyler produced the score for "Regeneration". Previously he produced music for the episode "Canamar". Tyler, a lifelong Star Trek fan, requested a full tour of the "Enterprise" set as a condition of his contract. He was asked to score more episodes but with limited time available, he specifically chose "Regeneration" as it was a Borg episode.

Writers Judith and Garfield Reeves-Stevens pitched a story to be used for season five of Enterprise which would have followed up on the events in "Regeneration". They intended to bring actress Alice Krige back to Star Trek as a Starfleet medical technician who makes contact with the Borg seen in this episode. This was to result in the creation of the Borg Queen first seen in First Contact, which was played by Krige.

== Reception ==
=== Ratings ===
"Regeneration" was first shown in the United States on May 7, 2003, on UPN. It received a 2.7/4% share among adults between the ages of 18 and 49. This means that it was seen by 2.7 percent of all 18- to 49-year-olds, and 4 percent of all 18- to 49-year-olds watching television at the time of the broadcast. The ratings were the same as the previous episode, "Cogenitor", but saw an increase in overall viewing numbers from 4.08 million viewers to 4.12 million. This meant that "Regeneration" was the fourth highest viewed episode of Enterprise at the time of airing in 2003.

=== Critical response ===
Michelle Erica Green reviewed the episode for TrekNation, and was concerned by the continuity issues that the events in the episode presented, such as why Captain Jean-Luc Picard of the USS Enterprise (NCC-1701-D) didn't have a record of Archer and the crew's encounter with some nameless technologically enhanced aliens who assimilated people when he met them for the first time in "Q Who". She thought that there were good performances by Linda Park and John Billingsley, but thought that Billingsley as Phlox could have been more emotionally affected by his partial assimilation. Jamahl Epsicokhan at his website "Jammer's Reviews" gave the episode a score of three and a half out of four, saying that it was "a deviously clever premise, with the best-executed action of the season", but that the show was "doing itself few favors by reaching into the obvious Trekkian bag of tricks". J.C. Maçek III of PopMatters, called it "probably the best and most risky episode of the season" and felt the homage to The Thing was all too brief, and Starfleet's memory loss about the Borg was contrived, but that despite some missed opportunities it was a "very fine Star Trek episode". Aint It Cool News gave the episode 3.5 out of 5. They praised the sense of dread, the performances, especially of Billingsley and Park, but complained that it strained credulity that Phlox could survive the Borg nanotechnology so easily. In his 2022 rewatch, Keith DeCandido of Tor.com gave it 6 out of 10. He found the episode "incredibly inconsequential" but "it's a good action story, at least".

=== Accolades ===
Space.com rated "Regeneration" as the 10th best Star Trek episode of all episodes across all its series up to that time. Den of Geek listed "Regeneration" as the third best episode of Enterprise behind "In a Mirror, Darkly" and "Carbon Creek". The Digital Fix said that "Regeneration" was the best episode of the second season.

SyFy ranked Phlox as best of all of the six main-cast space doctors of the Star Trek franchise. It called Regeneration "a stupid episode" and said that it was "ridiculous that Phlox cured himself of Borg" but that achievement made him by far the most effective of any doctor in all of Star Trek.

== Home media release ==
The first home media release of the episode was as part of the season two DVD boxset, released in the United States on July 26, 2005. One of the extras included on the sixth disc of the set was audio commentary on "Regeneration" by writers Michael Sussman and Phyllis Strong. A release on Blu-ray Disc for season two occurred on August 20, 2013. This edition included the latter commentary, as well as a new one recorded by cast member John Billingsley and his wife, guest star Bonita Friedericy.

The episode was also released as part of the DVD box set "Star Trek Fan Collective - Borg".
