= The Breach (Star Trek: Enterprise) =

- Star Trek: Enterprise episode
- Episode no.: Season 2 Episode 21
- Directed by: Robert Duncan McNeill
- Story by: Daniel McCarthy
- Teleplay by: Chris Black; John Shiban
- Editing by: David A. Koeppel
- Production code: 221
- Original air date: April 23, 2003

Guest appearances
- Henry Stram - Hudak; Mark Chaet - Yolen; Laura Putney - Trevix; D.C. Douglas - Zepht; Jamison Yang - Crewman

Episode chronology
← Previous "Horizon"	Next → "Cogenitor"
- Star Trek: Enterprise season 2

"The Breach" is the twenty-first episode of the second season and forty-seventh episode of the television series Star Trek: Enterprise. It originally aired on April 23, 2003, on UPN. This episode was written by Chris Black and John Shiban from a story by Daniel McCarthy; Robert Duncan McNeill directs. Guest stars include Henry Stram, Mark Chaet, Laura Putney, D.C. Douglas and Jamison Yang alongside the main cast of the show.

In the 22nd century, starship Enterprise is asked to evacuate three Denobulan geologists from a planet after its controlling government is taken over by a militant faction.

== Plot ==
Sato enters sickbay to give Doctor Phlox a PADD with a message from the Denobulan Science Academy. Before reading it, Phlox casually has her assist him, as she usually does, but this time he has her hold a tribble to her obvious delight while he opens a pen, takes the tribble back and feeds it to the animal within, to her dismay.

The message is their request whereby Enterprise goes to extract a group of three geologists from a planet where xenophobic militants have taken charge and decreed that all off-worlders must evacuate. Being experienced with caving, Ensign Mayweather is chosen to lead Commander Tucker and Lieutenant Reed on the underground rescue mission. They have only three days to return to the surface with the scientists before the negotiated government ceasefire expires.

As the Enterprise nears the planet, it comes to the aid of an alien evacuee transport, suffering from a dangerous radiation leak. The most seriously injured of the various aliens brought aboard is Hudak, an Antaran, whose species has a centuries long history of conflict and animosity with the Denobulans. Though suffering from a fatal case of radiation poisoning, and being the first time the two species have interacted in generations, he immediately refuses help from Doctor Phlox. Archer orders Phlox to treat him, but he reluctantly declines, since Denobulan medical ethics places the patient's wishes above all other considerations.

Underground, the crew make good progress, but Mayweather injures his leg. Leaving him behind, Reed and Tucker soon locate the Denobulan geologists, who are happily engaged in recording the various rare and precious geological features of the cavern. With time running out, Tucker is insistent the group departs, while the scientists downplay the level of the threat, but finally assent. Back on the ship, using tact and diplomacy of his own, Phlox endeavors to help Hudak, but his initial attempts end in failure. Phlox, for his part, is also upset at the mutual hatred between the two species - but since Hudak refuses to be treated, Phlox must wait. Eventually, Hudak reflects on Phlox's words and agrees to the lifesaving procedure. An agreement is then reached in which the three Denobulans are granted passage home aboard the same transport as Hudak.

== Production ==
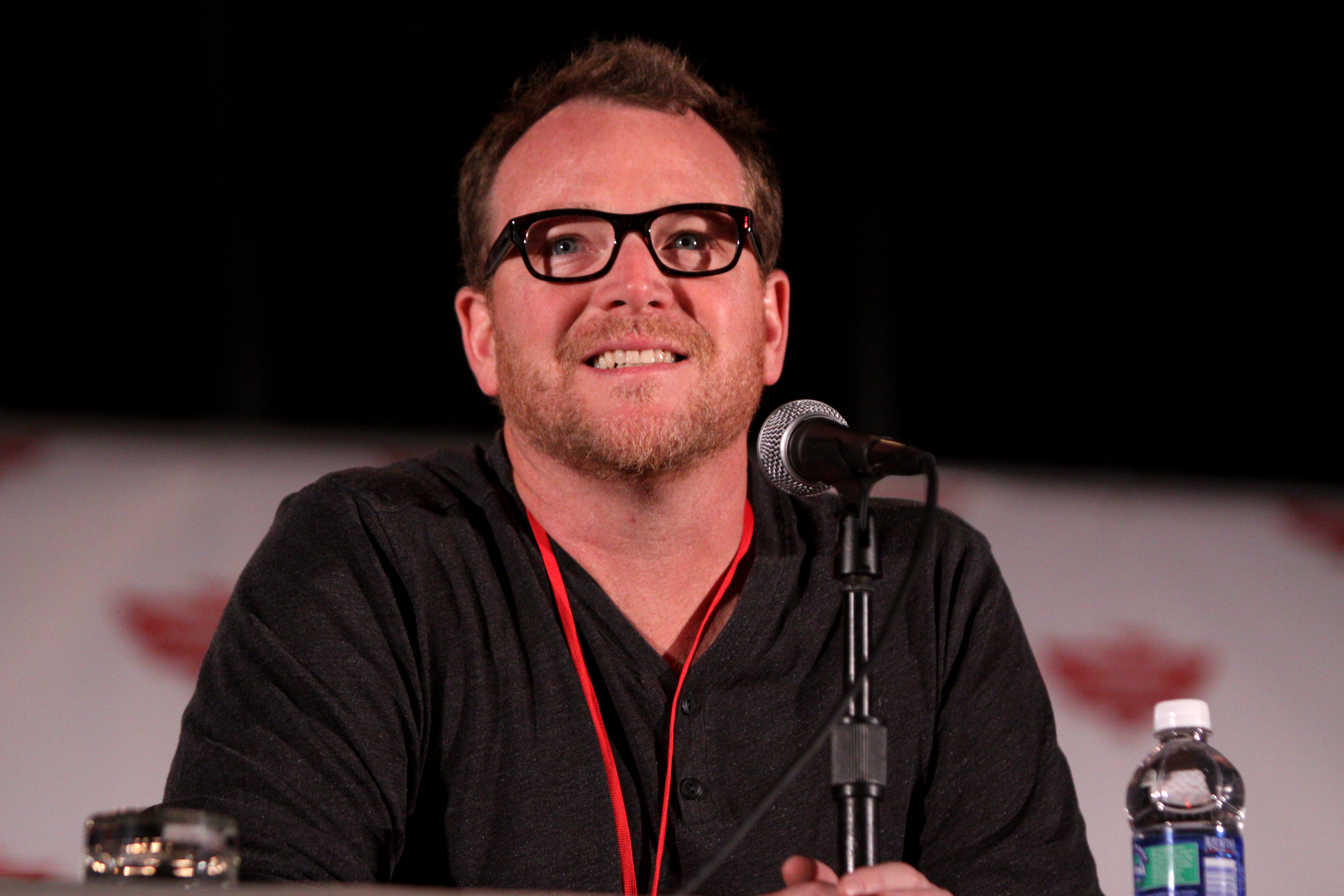
Star Trek: Voyager actor Robert Duncan McNeill directed this episode.

The episode was directed by Robert Duncan McNeill, who played Tom Paris in Star Trek: Voyager, and had directed four episodes of Voyager before directing for Enterprise. This was the second of four Enterprise episodes directed by McNeill. Of the episodes he directed, he said "The Breach" was the one he was most satisfied with because it was such a challenge. They had only thirty feet of rock wall, only a few visual FX moments, and they needed to create the appearance of a much longer descent. The script included a small slip and fall, and McNeill was inspired by Romancing the Stone to make it into a longer sequence where they're sliding down the waterfall, and by dragging them across the floor "We can make it seem like they're falling half a mile down when, really, they're falling 15 feet."

John Billingsley had envisioned the character of Doctor Phlox as an unflappable optimist, and he had mixed feelings about the revelation that the Denobulans had been war criminals. He understood the need for the writers to create conflict, but the idea seemed a little too jarring and there were aspects of the script that didn't quite work for him. Billingsley said: "McNeill did a terrific job in that episode keeping all from us getting overly mawkish" and also praised guest star Henry Stram and ultimately they were able to "find some good stuff" and Billingsley was pleased how the episode turned out.

After first shooting their normal ship scenes, Trinneer, Keating and Montgomery spent two days training with Stunt coordinator Vince Deadrick Jr., in climbing and rappelling techniques. He trained them at a 30-foot indoor climbing wall and outdoors at Stoney Point, Los Angeles County. Stunt performers Shawn Crowder, Marty Murry, and Korty Manns, took the place of Trip, Reed, and Mayweather respectively where needed. The cave scenes were also digitally enhanced to make them look more hazardous.

The episode came in eight minutes short, and McNeill had to come back to shoot extra footage. It was only a few weeks before airdate, so he had no time to edit the episode himself, and had not seen the final cut of the episode before it aired. McNeill enjoyed the experience: "It was really nice. Everyone's settled in the groove" and was already looking forward to directing his next episode in August.

== Reception ==
"The Breach" originally aired on April 23, 2003 on UPN. It aired at the same time as an episode of Dawson's Creek ("Catch–22"), also directed by Robert Duncan McNeill. It had a Nielsen ratings share of 2.3/4. It was watched by a total average of 3.19 million viewers. The ratings were small improvement over the lowpoint set by the previous episode "Horizon", but overall the audience numbers were down. Enterprise was beaten by Dawson's Creek in the weekly ratings.

Michelle Erica Green of TrekNation gave the episode a positive review and said she doesn't mind recycled stories as long as it was good material and done well, and was delighted to see the question of medical ethics revisited again. Jamahl Epsicokhan of Jammer's Reviews gave the episode 3 out of 4, and called it "A nice hour of very traditional Star Trek." Television Without Pity gave it an A grade.

In 2015, Den of Geek in a review of important show characters, noted him as "funny, quirky Phlox" and pointing out the character introduced the audience to the Denobulan species. They recommended the episodes "Dear Doctor", "Stigma", "The Breach", and "Doctor's Orders" for the Phlox character.

In his 2022 rewatch, Keith DeCandido of Tor.com gave it 7 out of 10.
