= Horizon (Star Trek: Enterprise) =

- Star Trek: Enterprise episode
- Episode no.: Season 2 Episode 20
- Directed by: James A. Contner
- Written by: André Bormanis
- Production code: 220
- Original air date: April 16, 2003

Guest appearances
- Joan Pringle - Rianna Mayweather; Corey Mendell Parker - Paul Mayweather; Nicole Forester - Nora; Philip Anthony-Rodriguez - Juan; Adam Paul - Crewman Nichols; Kenneth Feinberg - Alien Captain

Episode chronology
← Previous "Judgment"	Next → "The Breach"
- Star Trek: Enterprise season 2

"Horizon" is the twentieth episode of the second season of the science fiction television series Star Trek: Enterprise, and originally aired on April 16, 2003, on UPN. The episode was written by André Bormanis and directed by James A. Contner. The episode's guest stars included Nicole Forester, who had previously appeared in Star Trek: Deep Space Nine; Joan Pringle; and Corey Mendell Parker.

Set in the 22nd century, the series follows the adventures of the first Starfleet starship Enterprise, registration NX-01. When the ship detours to observe volcanic activity on a planet, Ensign Mayweather (Anthony Montgomery) takes the opportunity to visit his family on board the E.C.S. Horizon.

Montgomery had previously suggested the appearance of Mayweather's parents at the end of season one, and was pleased to see them introduced. Several sets to create the Horizon were created on a soundstage, with the related scenes filmed in the second half of the episode's shoot after the main cast were dismissed, with the exception of Montgomery. Critical response was mixed, and the episode received the lowest ratings for a first-run episode of the series so far, viewed by 3.36 million viewers.

== Plot ==
At the direction of Starfleet, Enterprise makes a detour to a planet passing between two gas giants in order to observe the gravitational forces and subsequent volcanic activity. Their new course takes the ship close to that of E.C.S. Horizon, the cargo vessel on which Ensign Mayweather grew up. He requests permission for a further detour to rejoin his family on Horizon, as his father is ill and he hasn't been able to visit him in four years. Captain Archer readily agrees, but bad news arrives when Mayweather learns that his father died some six weeks earlier.

As planned, Mayweather boards Horizon and receives a warm welcome from most of the crew, including his mother Rianna. He finds that his brother, Paul, has been named acting captain, but he doesn't seem to be coping well with his new responsibilities. Mayweather offers to make a few repairs and upgrades to systems on the ship, but Paul tells him to stop, making him feel uneasy and out of place. Soon afterward the ship comes under attack, and a homing device is placed on the hull. Mayweather then recommends a boost in the ship's fighting capability, but Paul insists that the safest course is to flee to the nearest port and yield the cargo as needed.

Back on Enterprise, Commander Tucker arranges a movie night for the crew featuring the Frankenstein film trilogy, and invites Sub-Commander T'Pol. She eventually consents, and finally finds in the film an insightful view into historical human-Vulcan relations. Meanwhile, Mayweather makes his intended modifications without permission, resulting in a confrontation when Paul finds out. The ship comes under further attack from an alien vessel, and Paul offers up the cargo as planned. The aliens refuse and demand the vessel as well. Left without any other option, Paul tells Mayweather to reinitiate the modifications and to detach the command module from the cargo section. They soon disable the alien ship. The brothers reconcile and Mayweather leaves, promising to visit again soon.

== Production ==
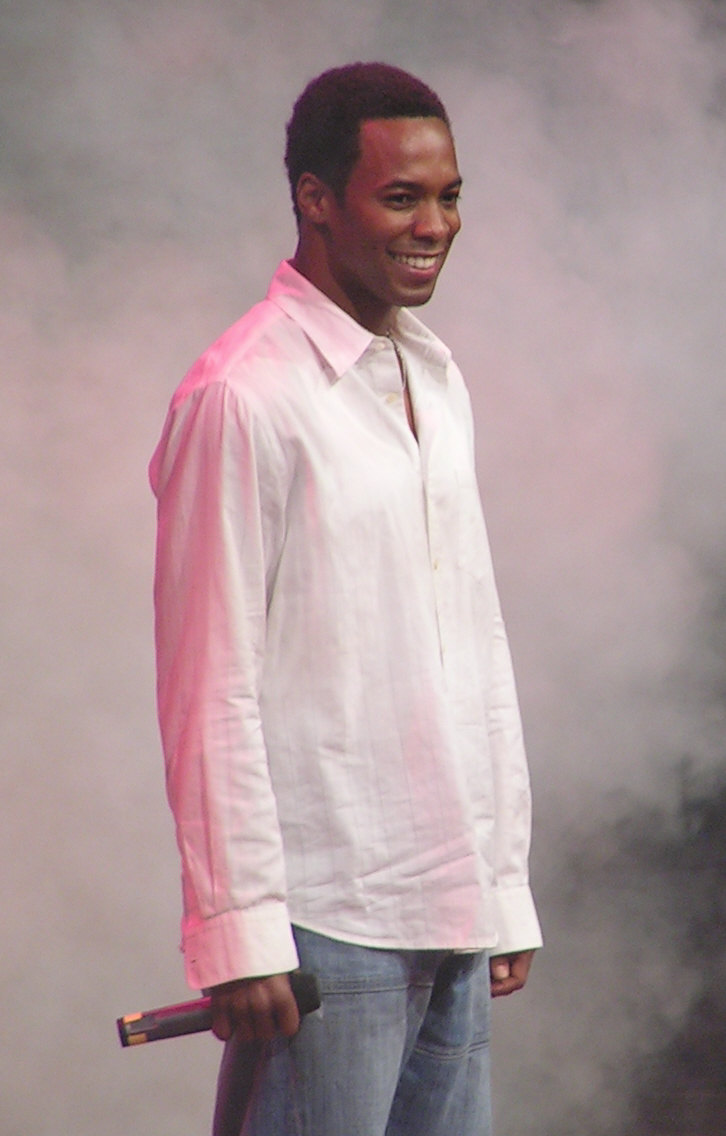
Anthony Montgomery was pleased to have the family of his character appear in "Horizon"

In an interview conducted towards the end of the first season of Enterprise, Anthony Montgomery suggested that it would be good to see Travis Mayweather's parents make an appearance in the show. Montgomery was pleased when this came true in "Horizon", saying, "It was really a touching episode for me, you get a feel of how hard it was for Travis to leave the family and join Starfleet."

Production began on January 28, 2003 and lasted for seven days. The first three days of filming took place on the Enterprise standing sets. The second day in particular took place mostly on the set for the gravity neutral "sweet spot" first seen in the Enterprise pilot, "Broken Bow". The main cast, with the exception of Montgomery, were only required for the first three days. Montgomery filmed his scenes over the course of all seven days along with the guest cast. Several sets were created on a soundstage to appear as the Horizon. These included the bridge of the cargo ship, a cargo hold, Mayweather's old quarters, a mess hall, and a variety of corridors. The Horizon itself was rendered using computer-generated imagery and was to appear as a similar type of cargo vessel to that seen in season one's "Fortunate Son".

Nicole Forester, who previously played a Dabo girl on Star Trek: Deep Space Nine, appeared in "Horizon" as Nora. Corey Mendell Parker and Joan Pringle both made their Star Trek debuts in this episode. The episode was written by André Bormanis, who had previously written episodes of Star Trek: Voyager and was the story editor for Enterprise during the first and second seasons.

== Reception ==
"Horizon" originally aired on UPN on April 16, 2003. In overnight figures from Nielsen the episode was thought to have received a 3.5/5% share among adults, beating The WB's Dawson's Creek in its timeslot. With those figures, while it would have continued a decrease in recent weeks, it would have still been more than the all-time low of "Vanishing Point", which recorded a share of 3.4%. The final adjusted ratings showed that "Horizon" received 3.36 million viewers, fewer than "Vanishing Point", setting the lowest rating record for a first-run episode of Enterprise at the time. Also Dawson's Creek actually beat Enterprise, with higher ratings although a lower number of viewers overall.

Michelle Erica Green, writing on the website TrekNation, enjoyed the performance of Anthony Montgomery after wondering why he hadn't been featured much so far in Enterprise. She said that the sub-plot was "witty" but didn't feel that the Mayweather family were well characterized. She found the episode frustrating because it seemed "to have all the elements in place to be a good episode". Jamahl Epsicokhan at his website Jammer's Reviews was neutral about the episode, saying that it was "not bad, but not particularly good or conclusive, either. Just simply 'there.'". He gave the episode a score of two and a half out of four. In scores given by readers of the website TrekWeb for the second season of Enterprise, "Horizon" was ranked 21st out of 26 episodes by average score. Based on the number of ten out of ten votes, it was placed last overall. James Gray of The Digital Fix criticized the episode as "just a variation on Season One's Favourite Son" [sic]. Baz Greendland also of The Digital Fix wrote: "'Horizon' is a largely dull, generic story with the dull, generic Mayweather" and said it "doesn’t do anything interesting with the boomer concept introduced in season one." Jordan Hoffman writing for Playboy.com ranked this episode 498 out of 695 Star Trek episodes, and wrote: "Decent world building as we visit Mayweather's family aboard their merchant vessel, but could use more oomph." In his 2022 rewatch, Keith DeCandido of Tor.com gave it 6 out of 10.

== Home media release ==
The episode was released on DVD as part of the season two box set on November 1, 2005 in the United States. A release on Blu-ray Disc for season two occurred on August 20, 2013.
