= Singularity (Star Trek: Enterprise) =

- Star Trek: Enterprise episode
- Episode no.: Season 2 Episode 9
- Directed by: Patrick Norris
- Written by: Chris Black
- Production code: 209
- Original air date: November 20, 2002

Guest appearance
- Matthew Kaminsky - Cunningham

Episode chronology
| ← Previous "The Communicator" | Next → "Vanishing Point" |
- Star Trek: Enterprise season 2

"Singularity" is the thirty-fifth episode (production #209) of the television series Star Trek: Enterprise, the ninth of the second season. The episode aired on UPN on November 20, 2002. The science fiction episode is set in the 22nd century of the Star Trek universe, where the NX-01 Enterprise with Captain Archer is exploring space.

The crew obsess over trivial matters when they explore a black hole in a triple star system and succumb to its radiation.

== Plot ==
It is August 14, 2152, and Enterprise decides to explore a unique black hole nestled within a triple star system. Cruising at impulse, it will take a few days to get there, freeing the crew up for other activities. Captain Archer uses the chance to work on the preface for a book about his father, and also asks Commander Tucker to look at the Captain's chair on the bridge. Meanwhile, Ensign Sato volunteers to help in the galley, Lieutenant Reed begins works on some new ship wide security protocols, and Doctor Phlox examines Ensign Mayweather's headache.

Over the next few days the crew starts obsessing about their selected tasks. Their behavior is also affecting their interactions — Reed and Tucker nearly come to blows, and Phlox sedates a frustrated and non-consenting Mayweather to perform an invasive medical test. The situation becomes so acute that Sub-Commander T'Pol, who remains unaffected, easily notices that everyone else is behaving oddly. Her investigation into the cause reveals that a peculiar form of radiation emitted from the black hole is the underlying cause. It will take two days to reverse course and leave the radiation field, and while she was determining this, everyone else on board has fallen unconscious.

There is an alternate path, but it will require piloting Enterprise closer to the dangerous black hole and she cannot navigate the treacherous field and pilot at the same time. T'Pol rouses the groggy captain with a cold shower and hot coffee, enough that he is able to man the helm. His ability to fly is sluggish, and as they near the exit, a large crumbling asteroid blocks Enterprise's path. Reed’s obsession created an automatic "Tactical Alert" that automatically kicks in and brings all defensive systems fully online, thus allowing T'Pol to blast the asteroids with the fully charged phase cannon. Once clear, things on-board soon return to normal, with the exception of the captain's improved chair and Reed's newly proven security protocol.

== Reception ==
"Singularity" was first broadcast November 20, 2002 on UPN. According to Nielsen it was watched by 4.83 million viewers.

The Digital Fix said this episode was "entertaining", and one of the "good episodes" from season two. In his 2022 rewatch, Keith DeCandido of Tor.com gave it seven out of ten.

Den of Geek recommended this episode and "Affliction" as important for character Reed. Geek.com rated this episode as having one of the top 35 moments in all of Star Trek, the genesis of Star Trek's "red alert".

== Home media release ==
This episode was released for home media use on DVD as part of the second series box set of Star Trek: Enterprise. Season Two was released on Blu-ray Disc August 20, 2013.
