= The Crossing (Star Trek: Enterprise) =

- Star Trek: Enterprise episode
- A possessed Tucker
- Episode no.: Season 2 Episode 18
- Directed by: David Livingston
- Story by: Rick Berman; Brannon Braga; André Bormanis
- Teleplay by: Rick Berman; Brannon Braga
- Production code: 218
- Original air date: April 2, 2003

Guest appearances
- Joseph Will - Crewman Michael Rostov; Steven Allerick - Ensign Cook; Alexander Chance - Crewman #1; Matthew Kiminsky - Crewman Cunningham; Valarie Ianniello - Female Crewmember

Episode chronology
← Previous "Canamar"	Next → "Judgment"
- Star Trek: Enterprise season 2

"The Crossing" is the forty-fourth episode of the television series Star Trek: Enterprise, the eighteenth of the second season. The episode aired on UPN on April 2, 2003.

Incorporeal beings attempt to take over the Earth starship Enterprise. At the start of the episode Enterprise is taken inside an enormous alien spacecraft of unknown origin, and the aliens take over various crewmember's bodies.

Later in the episode the crew takes shelter in the catwalk, which has enhanced shielding.

== Plot ==
While at warp speed, a huge alien vessel overtakes and swallows Enterprise, disabling the ship's engines and weapons. When the scanners register neither the alien ship nor its numerous energy-wisp-like incorporeal beings, Captain Archer takes Lieutenant Reed and Commander Tucker on an away mission to the interior. While there, Tucker is visibly "entered" by one of the beings before being returned to his normal state. Doctor Phlox's examination reveals no lingering effects.

Later, Tucker is possessed again, and is soon located in the mess hall enjoying the simple pleasures of food. When asked, the alien possessing Tucker says that they are explorers who merely want to experience the tangible nature of the corporeal state they long evolved from. In exchange, the crew would be permitted to have out of body experiences by "crossing" in to the incorporeal realm. Archer, doubtful of the aliens' intentions, demands the release of his ship, and the return of Tucker's consciousness, both of which quickly happen. Enterprise is now freed, but the engines are not operational. While making repairs, the crew starts displaying signs of possession one-by-one. Similar events occur throughout the ship, including the takeover of Reed, Ensign Sato, and 22 others – nearly 30% of the crew.

Ensign Mayweather, pursued by one of the aliens, finds sanctuary in the nacelle catwalk area, so Archer moves himself and 57 other uninfected crew there, with the wisp-incompatible Phlox remaining in sickbay. Sub-Commander T'Pol then proposes a plan to use her more disciplined mind to try to uncover the beings' intentions. Archer is opposed, but assents given that there is no alternative. T'Pol is soon overcome and discovers that the aliens plan to co-opt the 82 compatible crew-member's bodies to save themselves from their failing ship. Archer, T'Pol and Phlox then hatch a plan to forcibly expel the beings by asphyxiating the infected crew. Though he has to battle past an infected Tucker, Phlox is able to reach the atmospheric controls and floods the ship with carbon dioxide, and the aliens are forced to return to their ship. When the alien ship attempts to pursue Enterprise, Archer destroys it with two torpedoes.

== Production ==
Rick Berman described the episode as a "heavy science fiction episode that I'm very pleased with. That's the one with our 'wisps' that will remind people of the [alien clouds] from The Original Series."

The episode was filmed over seven days. Existing standing sets were used, including the Bridge, Ready Room, Mess Hall, Engineering, and Corridors. Additional sets from The Catwalk were also reused. A part of the alien vessel was constructed and extended using green-screen and computer-generated imagery in post-production.

== Reception ==
The Crossing was first broadcast April 2, 2003 on UPN. It had an average of 3.9 million viewers.

Michelle Erica Green at TrekToday was shocked at Archer blowing up the aliens compared to how she thought other Star Trek captains might have handled them. While she praised the special effects, "the shots of the alien ship," and the "details of Enterprise's innards" she said it was a "depressing outing for humanity's first encounter with non-corporeal aliens." Jammer's Reviews gave "The Crossing" 2 of 4 stars, saying in brief that its "early promise" quickly became "an overbaked stew of routine silliness". Jamahl Epsicokhan said what began "as epic, great-looking sci-fi" in its first act "hinting at...an interesting...truly different...life form...looking back at [corporeal] existence" was "promising material", but it turns into "a downhill slide, with a hostile invasion-of-the-body-snatchers" that ultimately ends up "recycling lame-brained Trek clichés." Television Without Pity gave the episode a grade C. In his 2022 rewatch, Keith DeCandido of Tor.com gave it 3 out of 10.

This episode was nominated for an Emmy Award for Outstanding Special Visual Effects for a Series.
