= Nicole Forester =

American actress

- Born: Nicole Theresa Schmidt; November 19, 1972 (age 53); Ann Arbor, Michigan, U.S.
- Education: American Academy of Dramatic Arts
- Years active: 1995–present
- Notable work: Guiding Light
- Spouse: Paul Brown (m. 2008)
- Children: 2

Nicole Forester (born Nicole Theresa Schmidt; November 19, 1972) is an American actress. She is best known for her role as Maggie Zajac on the Starz original series Boss and as Cassie Layne Winslow on Guiding Light.

== Early life ==
Forester was born in Ann Arbor, Michigan. She began dance training at the age of five and began working locally in professional musical theatre at the age of 12. She majored in drama in the Creative and Performing Arts Program at Winston Churchill High School in Livonia, Michigan (fellow alumni include actress Judy Greer and musician Rosie Thomas) and majored in Musical Theatre Performance at Western Michigan University before moving to Los Angeles at age 19. She graduated from the American Academy of Dramatic Arts in 1993, when she took Forester, her grandmother's maiden name, as her professional name.

== Career ==
Her early work in Los Angeles included roles in the television series Two and a Half Men, Monk, Will & Grace, The Single Guy, Beverly Hills 90210, and Mister Sterling, among others. Forester guest starred in two of the Star Trek spin-offs, playing a dabo girl in the Star Trek: Deep Space Nine episode "Distant Voices", and Nora in the Star Trek: Enterprise episode "Horizon". She also appeared in numerous national commercials, including The Olive Garden, Miller Lite, Claritin, and American Airlines. Forester has also appeared in many pilots, including playing the wife of Saturday Night Live's Chris Kattan in the TV movie sitcom Enough About Me for ABC.

After moving to New York City in 2005, Forester booked the contract role of "Cassie Layne Winslow" on CBS soap opera Guiding Light, replacing the originating actress, Laura Wright. In her three years on the show, Forester performed in nearly 300 episodes and received a Lead Actress Daytime Emmy Award nomination for her work in 2008.

In 2010, David Schwimmer cast Forester in his film, Trust, starring Clive Owen and Catherine Keener. Also in 2010 (and while 7 months pregnant with her second child), Forester worked with Richard Gere in The Double, directed by Michael Brandt. In 2012, Forester appeared in Jack Reacher, starring Tom Cruise and directed by Academy Award-winner Christopher McQuarrie.

In 2012, Forester filmed season two of Boss, the Golden Globe nominated drama series on Starz, starring Kelsey Grammer. Forester played "Maggie Zajac", the politically savvy wife of gubernatorial candidate and chronic philanderer "Ben Zajac", played by Jeff Hephner. From 2012 to 2021 she played Christie Casey (formerly Christie Jordan) in nine episodes of Chicago Fire and, in 2022, appeared as Marian Watts in the "Black Penguin" episode of FBI: International.

In 2023, Forester appeared in two films including as Jennifer Cooly in the drama The Dancing Monkey that was adapted from Eugene O'Neill's play The Hairy Ape, and as Erin in That's Funny, a 96% approval independent comedy-drama.

By 2026, Forester's appearances included as Jason 31's Partner in season 2, episode 5, of the TV series Dark Matter.

== Personal life ==
She is married to Paul Brown and they have two children, a daughter and a son.

Of French and German descent, Forester spent three years studying German at UCLA and, in 2006, a term at the Goethe-Institut in Schwaebisch Hall, Germany.

An avid knitter, Forester models on the cover of and inside the book Greetings from Knit Cafe by former CBS vice president, Suzan Mischer.

== Awards and nominations ==
Year	Award	Work	Result	Ref
2008	Daytime Emmy Award for Outstanding Lead Actress in a Drama Series	Guiding Light	Nominated	

Preceded by Laura Wright	Cassie Layne Winslow actress: Nicole Forester; 2005–2008	Succeeded by none
