= Cogenitor =

- Star Trek: Enterprise episode
- Episode no.: Season 2 Episode 22
- Directed by: LeVar Burton
- Written by: Rick Berman; Brannon Braga
- Production code: 222
- Original air date: April 30, 2003

Guest appearances
- Andreas Katsulas - Vissian Captain Drennik; F.J. Rio - Vissian Chief Engineer; Becky Wahlstrom - Vissian Cogenitor; Laura Interval - Veylo, Vissian Tactical Officer; Larissa Laskin - Calla, Vissian Engineer's Wife; Stacie Renna - Traistana

Episode chronology
← Previous "The Breach"	Next → "Regeneration"
- Star Trek: Enterprise season 2

"Cogenitor" is the 48th episode of the television series Star Trek: Enterprise, the 22nd episode of the second season. It originally aired April 30, 2003 on UPN.

Set in the 2100s of the Star Trek science fiction universe, the starship Enterprise led by Captain Archer encounters an alien race with a third gender.

== Plot ==
While exploring a hypergiant star, Enterprise makes first contact with an advanced and very friendly alien race known as the Vissians. The two starships' crews are happy to intermingle. Commander Tucker becomes intrigued when he meets a Vissian couple in the mess hall accompanied by a third member of their race, and learns that the being, which has no name, is a "cogenitor" - a third gender in Vissian biology. Cogenitors are needed to complete reproduction: they do not genetically contribute to offspring, but supply an enzyme required for fertilization. Since cogenitors only constitute 3% of the population, Vissians must apply to have a cogenitor assigned to them when they intend to conceive a child. Cogenitors are considered mentally deficient, and are not citizens on equal terms with men and women.

Elsewhere on the ship, Lieutenant Reed finds himself the romantic focus of a female Vissian crewmember - their tactical officer. Captain Archer bonds with the alien captain while on a three-day reconnaissance of the star in a small probe. Tucker becomes increasingly intent on the rights of the cogenitor and learns, with the help of Doctor Phlox, that they are actually equally intelligent. On the alien vessel, without the couple's knowledge, Tucker secretly encourages the cogenitor to learn to read, while building a friendship with them. Despite having a near-total lack of education available, the cogenitor is an insatiable learner. Soon learning the importance of names, the cogenitor asks to be called Charles (Commander Tucker's own first name). Tucker entertains the cogenitor on the Enterprise, showing the cogenitor the 1951 movie The Day the Earth Stood Still.

'Charles' soon realizes that future life in Vissian society would be unfulfilling. The cogenitor requests political asylum. Archer now returns to find himself in the middle of a first contact diplomatic crisis, with the Vissians confused and defensive at Tucker's interference in their traditions. Tucker appeals to Archer's sense of justice, but he sides with the Vissians. With the cogenitor returned, the Vissians hope good relations with the humans can continue. Later communications reveal that 'Charles' has died by suicide, thereby delaying the birth of the child and straining the relations between the two species. Archer summons Tucker and severely reprimands him for his lack of professionalism and judgment.

== Production ==
The guest cast in "Cogenitor" included the return of Andreas Katsulas in the role of the Vissian captain. Katsulas had previously appeared in several episodes of Star Trek: The Next Generation, playing the part of Romulan Commander Tomalak, and is also known for his role as Ambassador G'Kar in Babylon 5. Katsulas also appeared as the "one-armed man" in Harrison Ford's 1993 film The Fugitive. Shortly after filming "Cogenitor", Katsulas was diagnosed with incurable lung cancer.

== Continuity ==
When Tucker chooses a movie to show to the cogenitor, two of the options that appear on the screen are "Dixon Hill and the Black Orchid" and "The Bride of Chaotica", which refer to holodeck adventures of characters from other Star Trek series - respectively, Jean-Luc Picard's Dixon Hill and Tom Paris's Captain Proton.

== Reception ==
"Cogenitor" first aired April 30, 2003 on UPN. It had a Nielsen ratings share of 2.7/4. It was watched by a total average of 4.08 million viewers. American Idol on Fox dominated the Wednesday night ratings. Among science fiction or fantasy genre shows on television that week, the double episode season finale of Alias was on top, followed by Smallville. Enterprise rated lower than Charmed but ahead of Dawson's Creek.

Michelle Erica Green, writing for TrekNation, described "Cogenitor" as the best episode of Enterprise up to that time and noted similarities to The Handmaid's Tale and the Xenogenesis trilogy (Lilith's Brood). Jamahl Epsicokhan, on his website Jammer's Reviews, said that it was "the best and most probing episode of the season". In his 2022 rewatch, Keith DeCandido of Tor.com gave it 8 out of 10. He draws parallels to other Star Trek episodes "Half a Life" and "Thirty Days" saying they handle the moral conflict better. DeCandido is frustrated by the lack of consequences for Tucker, but appreciated other parts of the episode such as the eminent reasonableness of the Vissians in spite of it all.

TechRepublic included the episode on its list of the five best episodes of Enterprise. Slate Magazine ranked "Cogenitor" one of the ten best episodes in the Star Trek franchise. The A.V. Club included the episode on their list of the 10 episodes that best represent the show, and called it "Probably the best episode of Enterprise's first two years". Vox included it their list of the top 25 essential episodes of all Star Trek in 2016. The Digital Fix said this was a morality play about gender identity.

In a 2015 interview Dominic Keating, commented "I always say that the best episode we ever did was 'Cogenitor'." Trinneer was pleased with the development of his character, saying "it was important that Trip take responsibility for some of the stupid things that he does. Not to say that [helping the Cogenitor] was a stupid thing, but sometimes he would catch his foot in his mouth and then never really have to pay for it, the person commits suicide."
