= Precious Cargo (Star Trek: Enterprise) =

- Star Trek: Enterprise episode
- Episode no.: Season 2 Episode 11
- Directed by: David Livingston
- Story by: Rick Berman; Brannon Braga
- Teleplay by: David A. Goodman
- Cinematography by: Marvin V. Rush
- Production code: 211
- Original air date: December 11, 2002

Guest appearances
- Padma Lakshmi as Princess Kaitaama; Leland Crooke as Firek Plinn; Scott Klace as Firek Goff

Episode chronology
← Previous "Vanishing Point"	Next → "The Catwalk"
- Star Trek: Enterprise season 2

"Precious Cargo" is the thirty-seventh episode (production #211) of the American science fiction television series Star Trek: Enterprise. The episode aired on UPN on December 11, 2002. It is the eleventh episode of the series' second season.

Set in the 22nd century, the series follows the adventures of the first Starfleet starship Enterprise. In this episode, the Enterprise answers an alien distress call and Commander Tucker (Connor Trinneer) is kidnapped and then escapes with a spoiled and beautiful alien princess Kaitaama (Padma Lakshmi).

The episode is noted by technologists for its depiction of the universal translator, one of the technologies real-world experts are interested in realizing.

== Plot ==
Firek Goff, the captain of a Retellian cargo vessel, docks and asks Captain Archer for help; a passenger-carrying stasis pod is malfunctioning. Archer then offers Trip's services, while also extending an offer of Enterprise hospitality to both the captain and his brother, Plinn. When Tucker enters the cargo hold inside Goff's ship, he notices a beautiful female alien beneath the stasis canopy. Goff tells him that she is a passenger traveling home from a planet where she was studying medicine. He explains that because his ship can't travel over warp 2.2, she has to be kept in stasis because there is not enough food to support them all.

As Tucker starts working on the stasis pod, it begins to fail, and fearing that the occupant will suffocate, he releases her. Tucker is then knocked unconscious by Goff, who then flees from the faster Enterprise by disabling her engines and ionizing its warp trail, but Plinn is left behind. The female passenger, Kaitaama, is initially hostile. Tucker uses the translator Ensign Sato left with him, and he learns she is a high-ranking soon-to-be First Monarch being held for ransom. Tucker has a plan for escape, and though she believes that her status will keep her safe, she joins Tucker in an escape pod.

Meanwhile, Archer and Sub-Commander T'Pol use a ruse similar to "good cop/bad cop" to persuade Plinn to tell them how to locate Goff's ship. The plan works and Plinn reveals the warp core's signature frequency. After finding an island on the planet, Tucker and Kaitaama soon set up camp in a swamp, and their mutual antipathy eventually gives way to burgeoning sexual tension. Goff soon locates them using the homing beacon on the escape pod. Tucker and Goff fight until the latter is subdued by Kaitaama, just as an Enterprise rescue team also arrives. Kaitaama is later collected by a battle cruiser from her home world of Krios Prime, and suggests she will invite Tucker to visit her in the future when she is in power.

== Production ==
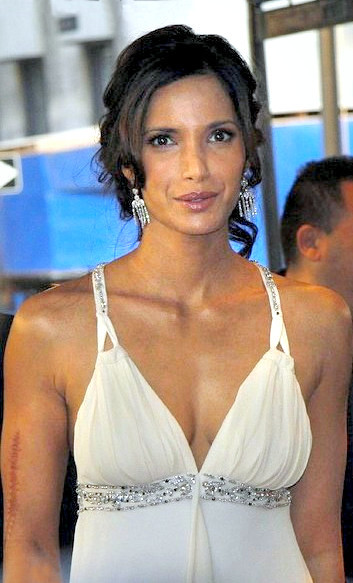
Actress and model Padma Lakshmi guest stars as an alien princess.

Writer David Goodman wrote the script based on the story idea presented by Rick Berman and Brannon Braga. Goodman, new to the series, notes that there had been a lot of turnover after the first season with writers, and that writer Chris Black, who had helped him on his draft, was sad about this. Goodman later joked that he was "proud of the fact that I've written one of the most hated episodes of Star Trek ever", he conceded that he was new and that many of the problems with the episode were his fault, but that the bad script he wrote was not the bad episode that aired. Braga did a rewrite, treating it like a screwball comedy, but he struggled and felt that he did not do a good job.

The episode guest stars the Indian-American actress and model Padma Lakshmi, who went on to host Top Chef. Her character Kaitaama is from Krios Prime, the same planet as Kamala from the Star Trek: The Next Generation ("The Perfect Mate"). Guest star Leland Crooke previously appeared in two episodes of Star Trek: Deep Space Nine as the Vorta Gelnon. Scott Klace was in the Star Trek: Voyager episode "Juggernaut".

The Retellian's cargo spacecraft was designed by John Eaves.

== Reception ==
"Precious Cargo" first aired on UPN December 11, 2002. The episode was watched by an audience of 4.67 million viewers, putting it among the lowest rated episodes of the season.

The good cop/bad cop scene with T'Pol and Archer was noted as one of the better parts of the episode. Michelle Erica Green of TrekNation was critical of the episode, calling it a rip-off of the episodes "Elaan of Troyius" and "The Perfect Mate", and "offering no plot twists that the viewer can't see coming." She also drew comparisons to the film Star Wars (1977), with the character Kaitaama being analogous to Princess Leia and the overall theme of rescuing a princess, flirtatious one liners, and crash landing on an exoplanet like Dagobah. Jammer's Reviews gave the episode zero out of four. In his 2022 rewatch, Keith DeCandido of Tor.com gave it one out of ten.

Star Trek Magazine rated "Precious Cargo" one out of five and named it the worst episode of the season. They said that, although there were many worst episodes to choose from, it was the worst because we had seen it all before; and called it "boring, without merit, and almost unwatchable". Fans at the 50th anniversary Star Trek convention voted "Precious Cargo" the tenth-worst episode of any Star Trek series. CBR included it on a ranking of Star Trek episodes they considered "So Bad They Must Be Seen". WhatCulture ranked it the seventh-worst episode of the Star Trek franchise; Screen Rant ranked it the eleventh-worst.

John Billingsley said it was his least favorite episode of the series: "It just didn't come together." Brannon Braga considered it one of the worst episodes of Star Trek.

The Digital Fix said this episode was not terrible, just that "these stories have been done before. And better."

== Home media release ==
The first home media release of "Precious Cargo" was as part of the season two DVD box set, released in the United States on July 26, 2005. A release on Blu-ray Disc for season two occurred on August 20, 2013.

== See also ==
- Arena (Star Trek: The Original Series) (Alien universal translator shown)
- Metamorphosis (Star Trek: The Original Series) (Star Trek universal translator introduced, 1967)
