= The Communicator (Star Trek: Enterprise) =

- Star Trek: Enterprise episode
- Reed and Archer are captured when they return to retrieve a lost communicator.
- Episode no.: Season 2 Episode 8
- Directed by: James A. Contner
- Story by: Rick Berman; Brannon Braga
- Teleplay by: André Bormanis
- Production code: 208
- Original air date: November 13, 2002

Guest appearances
- Francis Guinan - General Gosis; Tim Kelleher - Lieutenant Pell; Dennis Cockrum - Alien Barkeep; Brian Reddy - Doctor Temec; Jason Waters - Alien Soldier

Episode chronology
← Previous "The Seventh"	Next → "Singularity"
- Star Trek: Enterprise season 2

"The Communicator" is the thirty-fourth episode (production #208) of the television series Star Trek: Enterprise, the eighth of the second season. The episode aired on UPN on November 13, 2002. Set in the 22nd century, the starship Enterprise has set out from Earth to explore the galaxy.

Reed and Archer retrieve a communicator left behind on an alien planet, but are captured in the process.

== Plot ==
After returning from an exploratory away mission to a pre-warp society on the brink of war, Lieutenant Reed is unable to locate his communicator. A search of the shuttle bay area proves fruitless, so Captain Archer and Reed return to the planet to try to find it, so as not to leave a contaminant within the culture. Unfortunately, they then manage to walk into a trap set by the local military, who have already found the communicator. With their capture, the local commander, General Gosis, also possesses 'contaminant' scanners and a phase pistol.

Becoming desperate to locate the away team, Sub-Commander T'Pol's attempt at contact actually divulges the Captain's identity, and Archer and Reed are physically interrogated. After a mild beating, it is discovered that not only are Archer’s and Reed's forehead morphology not the same as the locals', but they also have iron-based red blood, and vastly different internal organs. In response, Archer and Reed improvise a story about being genetically-altered prototypes (with prototype equipment) from an opposing faction known as the Alliance. While allaying suspicion that they are aliens, the military commander decides to hang Archer and Reed so that autopsies can be performed to discover more about their "enhancements".

Meanwhile, on Enterprise, a rescue mission is planned by Commander Tucker using the captured Suliban cell ship (as seen in episode "Broken Bow"), but problems arise with its cloak. In their cell, Archer and Reed contemplate the irony of their adherence to an early version of Starfleet's Prime Directive. As they are about to be hanged, the cloaked Suliban ship with T'Pol, Tucker, and Ensign Mayweather arrives, enabling Archer and Reed to escape with their shuttle-pod and captured technology. Later, back on Enterprise, Archer reflects on the consequences of their actions even in the absence of foreign artifacts, and T'Pol is impressed that Archer was willing to sacrifice himself in the line of duty.

== Production ==
The episode was directed by James Contner, and was his fourth time directing for the show. The script was written by Andre Bormanis from a story by Rick Berman and Brannon Braga. The episode explores a premise hinted at in the original Star Trek, at the end of "A Piece of the Action", when Doctor McCoy jokes about having accidentally left his communicator behind.

Guest cast Francis Guinan and Dennis Cockrum previously appeared in the Star Trek: Voyager episode "Live Fast and Prosper", and Tim Kelleher portrayed ex-Borg "Four of Nine" in the episode "Survival Instinct".

== Reception ==
Jamahl Epsicokhan at his website "Jammer's Reviews" gave the episode 2.5 out of 4. The Digital Fix noted this as an example of Enterprise doing classic Star Trek storytelling, and said it was "a surprising good Prime Directive story", commenting how the plot captures events "spiraling out of control" when a Star Trek technology device, a communicator, is left behind on an alien planet. In his 2022 rewatch, Keith DeCandido of Tor.com gave it 4 out of 10.

Den of Geek recommended this episode to understand the importance of the Jonathan Archer character to the show.

== Home media release ==
This episode was released for home media use on DVD as part of the second series box set of Star Trek: Enterprise. Season Two was released on Blu-ray Disc August 20, 2013.
