= Vanishing Point (Star Trek: Enterprise) =

- Star Trek: Enterprise episode
- Hoshi questions the nature of her existence after using the transporter.
- Episode no.: Season 2 Episode 10
- Directed by: David Straiton
- Written by: Rick Berman; Brannon Braga
- Production code: 210
- Original air date: November 27, 2002

Guest appearances
- Keone Young - Hoshi's Father; Gary Riotto - Alien #1; Ric Sarabia - Alien #2; Moran Margolis - Crewman Baird; Carly Thomas - Alison

Episode chronology
| ← Previous "Singularity" | Next → "Precious Cargo" |
- Star Trek: Enterprise season 2

"Vanishing Point" is the 36th episode (production #210) of the television series Star Trek: Enterprise, the tenth of the second season. Hoshi is on an away mission which requires teleportation for evacuation. Hoshi is the communications officer aboard the starship NX-01 Enterprise, on this television show set in the 22nd century of the Star Trek science fiction universe.

The episode explores one of the classic staples of the Star Trek universe, a transporter-gone-wrong theme. Ensign Hoshi Sato passes through the transporter and finds that she is slowly disappearing. At the same time, she is the only person who can see aliens planting explosives in key ship systems, with no way to warn the crew.

The episode first aired on UPN on November 27, 2002. It had a Nielsen rating of 2.5/4 and an audience of 3.78 million viewers.

== Plot ==
Ensign Sato and Commander Tucker are on an away mission, taking pictures and gathering data and samples from an ancient set of ruins. Their mission is cut short, however, when a diamagnetic storm approaches, but before they can make it back to the shuttlepod they are forced to use the transporter instead. Sato is reluctant to use it, so Tucker goes back first. After the incident, aboard Enterprise, Sato feels that things are not right, particularly due to it being her first time using a transporter. After a visit to Doctor Phlox, she goes to sleep, hoping to feel better in the morning.

She is wakened by an emergency call from the bridge having apparently overslept by three hours. On the bridge, Captain Archer informs her that Tucker and Ensign Mayweather have been taken hostage on the planet while retrieving the shuttlepod. Sato is unable to help, failing to understand the "simple bi-modal syntax" of the aliens. She is ordered to return to her quarters, where she sees her reflection in the mirror fade away and water passing through her hands when she takes a shower. Phlox still cannot find anything wrong, attributing Sato's experience to transporter anxiety. But only a little while later, she completely dematerializes.

The crew begin to search for her, and she observes Phlox and Tucker scanning the ship for her cellular residue. She watches Archer speak with her father to inform him of her "death". In her wanderings, she hears and later encounters two strange aliens who are planting and arming suspicious devices throughout the ship. She attempts to disrupt a circuit in Capt. Archer's cabin, in the hopes an S.O.S. Morse code flashing signal will alert Archer's notice. T'Pol dismisses it as a malfunction and suggests Archer needs rest after the difficult day they have all had (due to Hoshi's passing). Unable to warn anyone, she endeavors to interrupt the explosive devices, reaching in and switching them off as they are activated, unseen by the treacherous reptilian aliens. This eventually leads her onto the escaping aliens' transporting device, only to rematerialize in the Enterprise's transporter room. She is disoriented, and concerned about the aliens, warning that the ship is about to be blown up, but Lieutenant Reed explains to her that she has been trapped for only 8.3 seconds in the pattern buffer because of the storm and that her recent experiences could only have been her own mind's anxiety hallucinations; in effect, a dream.

== Background ==
Transporter accidents have been a staple of the Star Trek universe since the 1960s TV shows (see "Mirror, Mirror" (1967)) and some famous examples are the transporter accident in Star Trek:The Motion Picture (1979) and the Star Trek: The Next Generation episode which makes a copy of Riker. This episode explores what happens to consciousness during a period in which the person does not have a body. Some have compared transporters to general anesthesia in modern society.

== Production ==
The episode was written by Rick Berman and Brannon Braga, and directed by David Straiton. Straiton also directed "Desert Crossing" in season one and "A Night in Sickbay" earlier in season two.

Production began Wednesday, October 2, 2002. The Fox 11 KTTV show Good Day Live visited the set and interviewed the cast. The episode was filmed in non-chronological order, scenes in Transporter Alcove that would include green-screen optical effects were filmed first, with the "vanishing" effect to be added in post production. Existing standing sets of the ship interiors were reused, including the ship's gym, a set that seen for the first time in "A Night in Sickbay". Park and Trinneer filmed the scenes in the Alien Ruins on Tuesday. Wednesday, October 9, was a special day, Scott Bakula was welcomed with a red-carpet to celebrate his birthday, and his trailer was draped with streamers and banners. Production personnel wore black baseball caps with the word "CAPTAIN" on it to mark the occasion.

Guest star Keone Young who plays Hoshi's father, previously portrayed baseball legend Buck Bokai in the Deep Space Nine episode "If Wishes Were Horses". Morgan Margolis, who plays Crewman Baird, who temporarily replaces Hoshi, previously appeared as an alien in the Star Trek: Voyager episode "Living Witness".

== Reception ==
"Vanishing Point" first aired on UPN November 27, November 2002, the Wednesday before Thanksgiving. According to Nielsen it had a rating of 2.5 and a share of four, meaning 2.5 percent of households in America with TV sets saw the episode, and 4% of households watching television at the time were watching the show. The episode was watched by an audience of 3.78 million viewers, a new low for the series.

Jamahl Epsicokhan of Jammer's Reviews gave it 3.5 out of 4, and called it "Creepy and psychologically compelling, with enough carefully navigated plot manipulations to keep you guessing." Aint It Cool News gave the episode 3 out of 5, and praised Linda Park, "who's in every scene and always manages to bring a realistic vulnerability too rare to Star Trek. The producers decided to hire only two female regulars this year, but they sure hired the right two." They thought some viewers would hate the ending and the resemblance to the episode "The Next Phase". Michelle Erica Green of TrekNation found the ending too predictable, and felt there was not enough plot for a main storyline. She thought "Linda Park does a nice job with the material she's given" but wished the alien relics could have somehow been made relevant to Sato's disappearance, but concludes that ultimately "It's all a big tease". Green also wondered if the episode was deliberately dumped in the pre-Thanksgiving timeslot when ratings were inevitably going to be terrible. In 2021, The Digital Fix compared this to the Star Trek: The Next Generation episode "The Next Phase", which also explored the results of a transporter accident, and complained about the lack of originality "these stories have been done before. And better." In his 2022 rewatch, Keith DeCandido of Tor.com gave it 2 out of 10.

In 2020, Den of Geek ranked this episode the twelfth scariest episode of all Star Trek series. Star Trek: The Complete Manual published by SciFiNow listed it as the fourth worst episode of the whole series.

== Home media release ==
"Vanishing Point" was released for home media use on DVD as part of the season two DVD box set, released in the United States on July 26, 2005. Season Two was released on Blu-ray Disc August 20, 2013.

The episode was also published as a single episode on the pay-to-play streaming service CBS All Access in the 2010s.

== See also ==
- Second Chances (Star Trek: The Next Generation) (Transporter accident)
- The Next Phase (Transporter incident)
