= Canamar =

- Star Trek: Enterprise episode
- Episode no.: Season 2 Episode 17
- Directed by: Allan Kroeker
- Written by: John Shiban
- Production code: 217
- Original air date: February 26, 2003

Guest appearances
- Mark Rolston - Kuroda Lor-ehn; Holmes Osborne - Enolian Official; Michael McGrady - Nausicaan Prisoner; Sean Whalen - Zoumas; Brian Morri - Enolian Guard; John Hansen - Prisoner

Episode chronology
← Previous "Future Tense"	Next → "The Crossing"
- Star Trek: Enterprise season 2

"Canamar" is the forty-third episode of the science fiction television series Star Trek: Enterprise, the seventeenth of the second season (production #217). The episode aired on UPN on February 26, 2003.

Mistaken for smugglers, Captain Archer and Commander Tucker find themselves on a prisoner transport ship.

Canamar is the name of the Enolian penal colony. The episode also features Sub-commander T'Pol, and alien prisoner Kuroda (Mark Rolston).

== Plot ==
Upon leaving the Enolian homeworld, Captain Archer and Commander Tucker are mistakenly identified as smugglers and arrested. They are placed on a prison transport headed for the penal colony known as Canamar. Among their fellow prisoners is a man named Kuroda, and a hulking Nausicaan. Back on Enterprise, Sub-Commander T'Pol, having found the abandoned shuttlepod, manages to convince an Enolian official that Archer and Tucker are innocent. Just as they are about to be released, however, Kuroda breaks free and takes down the guard and pilot.

When the vessel comes under attack from Enolian patrol ships, Archer convinces Kuroda to allow Tucker to assist them. Tucker manages to create a plasma cloud diversion, allowing the transport to jump to warp. Kuroda is impressed with Archer's ploy. In fact, Kuroda has come to respect Archer and asks him to join him on his next endeavor. As the two men talk, Kuroda reveals that he was 14 when he first spent time in a penal colony. He was innocent, but he still spent five years in prison, and started making a living as a criminal after he was released. Kuroda also finally reveals that they will rendezvous with another ship at Tamaal and destroy the transport. Archer, determined to save the other prisoners, enlists Tucker's aid.

Tucker is freed under the pretext of fixing a docking hatch, and manages to render the Nausicaan unconscious, but draws the attention of Kuroda, who realizes that Archer has been plotting against him all along. The transport soon docks, but when the doors open, Lieutenant Reed and Ensign Mayweather appear. The crew evacuate the transport, which is now in a decaying orbit, but Kuroda refuses to leave. Back on Enterprise, the Enolian official demands a report for his superiors. Archer tersely informs the official that he and Tucker were falsely arrested, and wonders how many others on their way to Canamar do not belong there.

== Production ==
The episode was directed by Allan Kroeker. It was written by John Shiban who previous wrote the episodes "Minefield" and "Dawn". The story idea had originally been part of the episode Judgment where Archer was sentenced to a Klingon penal colony but Brannon Braga liked "Archer on a prison transport" concept so much he wanted to make it into a separate episode, which eventually became "Canamar".

Filming took eight days in two blocks, six days from December 13 to December 20 and after the holidays another two days on Monday and Tuesday, January 5 and January 6, 2003. The majority of the regular cast finished after two days of filming, Bakula and Trinneer were required for the entire shoot, most of which took place on the Enolian prison ship.

Guest star Mark Rolston who played Kuroda, previously appeared as "Lieutenant Pierce" in The Next Generation episode '"Eye of the Beholder". He found the fight scenes strenuous, and said "Scott [Bakula] and I must have spent ten hours filming the fights. And let me tell you, both of us are in our forties now so it's not quite as easy as it used to be."

Brian Tyler composed the score for the episode (and the episode Regeneration later in the season). Tyler previously scored the Sci-Fi channel mini-series Frank Herbert's Children of Dune and had replaced composer Jerry Goldsmith on the film Timeline. Some of his work had been used as a temp track and the producers decided to ask him if he would score the episode. As a Star Trek fan he agreed, with the added condition that he also get a full tour of the "Enterprise" set.

== Reception ==
Canamar was first broadcast February 26, 2003 on UPN. It had an average of 4.10 million viewers.

Michelle Erica Green at TrekToday called it "a decent action hour, and then it's over" summing up that it's not "offering much subtextual commentary on prison" and not moving "Trek's social agenda" nor "breaking new...ground...showing the gritty sides of main characters." Green said it "feels like a merger of Next Gen's 'Gambit' and Voyager's 'The Chute'" noting that "the action is well-paced and engrossing" while crediting the "good guest performances and excellent directing." Jammer's Reviews rated this 2 out of 4 stars with a brief summation of an "excellent lesson in how to spin your wheels." Jamahl Epsicokhan called it "formulaic action fluff" even though admitting it was "handsomely produced" and "slickly directed."

The Digital Fix said this episode was "fun" and compared it to a theatrical movie.

In his 2022 rewatch, Keith DeCandido of Tor.com gave it 4 out of 10.

== Awards ==
The episode was nominated for an Emmy Award in the category Outstanding Makeup For A Series (Prosthetic), but lost to Primetime Glick.

== Home media release ==
This episode was released for home media use on DVD as part of the second series box set of Star Trek: Enterprise. Season Two was released on Blu-ray Disc August 20, 2013.
