= A Night in Sickbay =

- Star Trek: Enterprise episode
- Episode no.: Season 2 Episode 5
- Directed by: David Straiton
- Written by: Rick Berman; Brannon Braga
- Production code: 205
- Original air date: October 16, 2002

Guest appearance
- Vaughn Armstrong – Kreetassan Captain

Episode chronology
← Previous "Dead Stop"	Next → "Marauders"
- Star Trek: Enterprise season 2

"A Night In Sickbay" is the thirty-first episode of the American science fiction television series Star Trek: Enterprise, the fifth episode of season two. It first aired on October 16, 2002, on UPN within the United States. The episode was written by executive producers Brannon Braga and Rick Berman, and directed by David Straiton.

Set in the 22nd century, the series follows the adventures of the first deep space Starfleet starship Enterprise, registration NX-01. In this episode, after visiting the planet Kreetassa, Captain Archer's (Scott Bakula) dog Porthos falls ill with an unknown pathogen. Archer stays overnight in sickbay to look after his dog with Doctor Phlox (John Billingsley), knowing that afterwards he must take part in an elaborate apology display to the Kreetassans.

The episode featured Vaughn Armstrong, who reprised his role of the Kreetassan Captain from the episode "Vox Sola". Several scenes also proved challenging for the main dog actor who portrayed Porthos, who was named Breezy. She was required to lie still for long periods, jump into Bakula's arms on command, and also act on her own while her trainer was not on set. Berman compared the relationship between Archer and Phlox to The Odd Couple, saying that the episode was "a lot of fun". The episode was nominated for the 2003 Hugo Award for Best Dramatic Presentation (short form) and received the highest Nielsen ratings for any episode of Enterprise during season two at that point. Critical reception at the time was mixed, and in retrospect reviews were more negative.

== Plot ==
After a five-day away mission spent apologising on the planet Kreetassa, the away team consisting of Captain Archer, Sub-Commander T'Pol, Ensign Sato, and Archer's dog, Porthos, return to the ship to decontaminate. Porthos has acquired a pathogen on the planet surface and must be quarantined. Archer learns from Commander Tucker of the ship's need for an extra plasma injector from the Kreetassans, but negotiations break down after it is discovered that Porthos had urinated on a sacred tree, insulting the Kreetassans. Archer reacts poorly to the news and is given a list of requirements he must meet in order to apologise.

He and Doctor Phlox then tend to Porthos, and Archer spends the night in Sickbay to be with his pet. Throughout the night, as Porthos' immune system weakens, Archer experiences Phlox's side of life in Sickbay. During the night, as he dreams of Porthos' funeral, Archer also deals with unresolved and suppressed sexual tension with T'Pol. He also relates to Phlox how he met Porthos, and how he was the last in a litter of four male puppies, the 'Four Musketeers'. Through it all, Archer struggles to reach an emotional understanding with Phlox and T'Pol, as the two alien senior-crew members have little grasp of the human-pet relationship, and Phlox keeps offering Archer unsolicited advice about dealing with his apparent feelings for T'Pol.

T'Pol, working out in the gym, also keeps urging Archer to apologize to the Kreetassans for Porthos' behavior, but Archer resists because he blames them for Porthos' illness. In the end, Porthos recovers following a pituitary transplant from an alien chameleon. Finally swallowing his pride, Archer then goes down to the Kreetassan capital and delivers an intricate ritual apology which involves slicing a tree trunk with a chainsaw, arranging the pieces of wood in a complex pattern on the ground, and chanting phrases in the Kreetassan language. Having successfully apologised to the Kreetassans, the crew finally manage to procure three plasma injectors prior to their departure.

== Production ==
Executive producers Rick Berman and Brannon Braga had worked together to write a series of episodes for Star Trek: Enterprise, with "A Night in Sickbay" amongst them. Berman originally described the episode at a press junket when talking about season two at an event held by UPN for the Television Critics Association. He said it was a "very humorous episode that has our good captain going and spending some time in sickbay, because his dog gets sick. He moves into sickbay the same way a mother will move into the hospital when her child gets sick, and it ends up being an 'Odd Couple' kind of an episode between the captain and Dr. Phlox. It's a lot of fun." Bakula also explained in an interview with the website TrekWeb that the episode featured Archer's dog Porthos as a background character, and that it was also about Archer spending a night in sickbay with Phlox. He said that this meant that the viewer will "find out a lot of stuff about [Phlox] that we may not have wanted to know; like what he does when he's in his off hours... he has things to cut and trim!" Billingsley said later that he enjoyed working with Bakula on this episode, and called "A Night in Sickbay" one of his favourites.

The episode was directed by David Straiton, who had previously directed "Desert Crossing". The shoot took six and a half days, which concluded on August 8, 2002. "A Night in Sickbay" was intended to be a low-cost episode as the majority of scenes required only the use of the standing sets for the series. The only credited guest star in "A Night in Sickbay" was Vaughn Armstrong, who played the Kreetassan captain once again. Armstrong is better known for his recurring role in Enterprise as Admiral Maxwell Forrest, but had previously played the Kreetassan captain in the first season episode "Vox Sola". In order to appear as the captain, some three and a half hours of make-up time was required, with the actor needed to arrive to have his make-up applied at 5:30am for his one day of shooting. Armstrong appeared in a variety of different roles in several different Star Trek programs, dating back to the Star Trek: The Next Generation season one episode "Heart of Glory". Other make-up effects during this instalment of Enterprise included a pair of prosthetic feet for Dr. Phlox, although other effects for the character were added in post-production.

=== Porthos ===
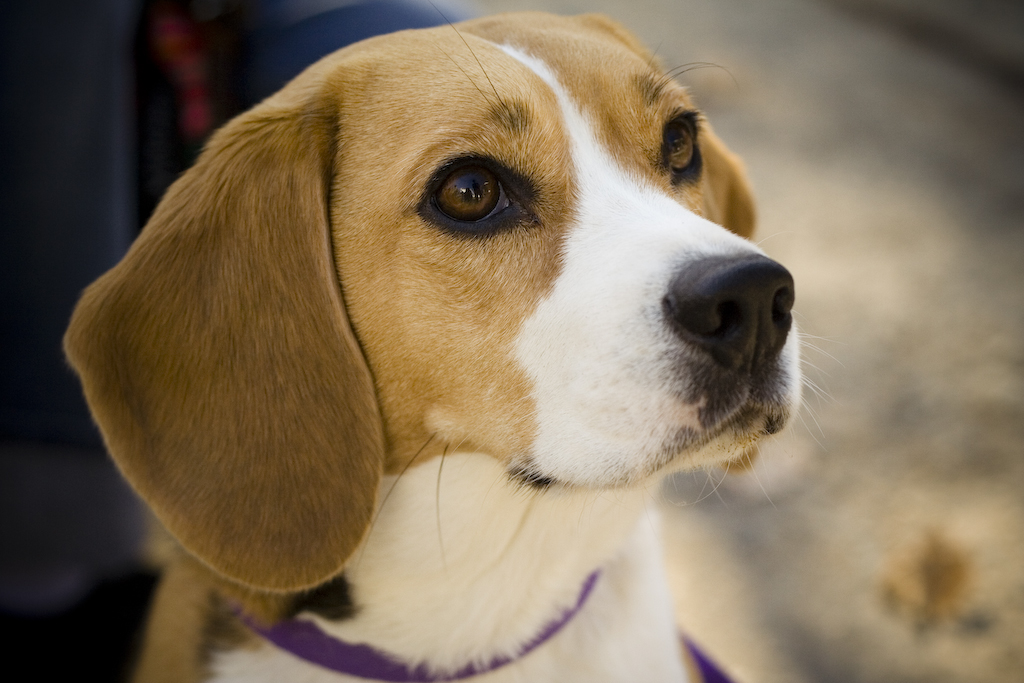
Porthos was played by more than one Beagle (example of a Beagle pictured), and was also represented by a prop dog for some scenes.

There were two Beagles portraying Porthos, who were supplied by Performing Animal Troupe, an animal supply company for film and television. These dogs included a female Beagle called Breezy, who was the main dog actor who played Porthos during season two. A second dog called Windy provided backup to Breezy. Breezy was the original double for male dog actor Prada who appeared in the first-season episodes of Enterprise up until "Two Days and Two Nights", when Breezy became the main dog. She had also previously appeared as Lou in the 2001 film Cats & Dogs.

More than one scene proved problematic for Breezy during the filming of the episode, as the decontamination room set was an enclosed four wall set, meaning that in the scene where Archer rubs down Porthos with decontamination gel, Breezy's trainer Scott Rowe couldn't be on the set with her. Normally he would have been behind the camera assisting the director by ensuring the dog is looking wherever the scene required. He hoped that with him off the set, that Breezy would look where required and not directly at the camera. In order to prepare for the scene where Porthos leaps out of an immersion tank and into Archer's arms, Rowe had a mock-up created so he could practice it with Breezy. He said that "By the time we went into it on that one day to prep on set with Scott, she was jumping out of it into my arms, but I had to make sure that she's going to jump out and do it into Scott's arms." In the final scene, not only did Breezy leap into Bakula's arms, but she also licked him repeatedly on the face. This wasn't due to training, but because they wiped food on Bakula's face.

A further challenge for the dog actor was to lie still in an isolation tank and not move even when petted by Bakula or Billingsley during some long scenes whilst on screen. At times a stunt dog was used, but Breezy was required for any close-ups. A Beagle prop was also created for the scenes in the isolation tank and to be submersed in a super-hydration tank. The prop was created by Joel Harlow, who had also created make-up designs for the television series Carnivàle and the film The Chronicles of Riddick.

== Reception ==
"A Night in Sickbay" was first aired in the United States on the UPN on October 16, 2002. It received Nielsen ratings of a 3.9/6 percentage share among all adults, including 6% of all adults watching television at the time of the broadcast. Although overnight figures had shown a slight decrease from the previous episode, the final numbers showed that the ratings were the highest seen so far during season two, and the third week of increased ratings for Enterprise in succession. This meant that 6.26 million viewers watched the episode, an increase of 860,000 viewers from the previous week's episode, making it the highest viewed episode since season one's "Sleeping Dogs". Alexander Chase at USA Today said the numbers "confirm a ratings turnaround for the newest Trek series". The episode placed Enterprise fourth in a list of the most highly rated science fiction or fantasy genre shows on television for that week, behind Alias, Smallville and John Doe.

Herc of Ain't It Cool News rated the episode three out of five, and praised the story about how Porthos was named and the elements of sexual tension between Archer and T'Pol. He thought the Odd Couple type relationship between Archer and Phlox did not work all the time, that there were too many misfires in the comedic elements, and the episode was repeating things that had already "Been seen done." Michelle Erica Green of TrekNation, said she enjoyed the episode on the whole and enjoyed the characterisation. She criticised the non-moving Beagle prop as it made her son think the dog was dead, which was then followed by "what looks like a drowned dog in formaldehyde". Jamahl Epsicokhan of Jammer's Reviews called it "easily the dumbest concept for an episode of Star Trek since Voyager's holodeck was hijacked by the residents of Fair Haven", and gave it a score of one out of four. He felt that the episode made a mockery out of the characters, and that some of the situations they were placed in were just ridiculous. In his 2022 rewatch, Keith DeCandido of Tor.com gave it zero out of ten.

IGN called it "The hands-down worst show of the season". TechRepublic included the episode on its list of the five worst episodes of Enterprise. Star Trek: The Complete Manual published by SciFiNow listed it as the third worst episode of the series. Screen Rant ranked "A Night in Sickbay" the 14th worst Star Trek episode, highlighting what they felt were poor character development choices and a weak plot that revolved around a sick dog (Porthos) that peed on a tree. WhatCulture ranked this episode the 17th worst episode of Star Trek. The Digital Fix felt this was a "bad episode", but noted it for experimenting with format. Den of Geek defended the episode, saying it was flawed, but nowhere near as bad as "Spock's Brain" or "Threshold". In 2016, SyFy included this episode in a group of Star Trek episodes they felt were commonly disliked, but "deserved a second chance".

== Awards ==
The episode was nominated for the Hugo Award for Best Dramatic Presentation (short form) at the 2003 awards alongside "Carbon Creek" and episodes of Buffy the Vampire Slayer, Angel, and Firefly. The award went to the Buffy episode "Conversations with Dead People".

== Home media ==
The first home media release of "A Night in Sickbay" was part of the season two DVD box set, released in the United States on August 7, 2005. The release featured deleted scenes from the episode as well as a special feature on the episode entitled "Inside A Night in Sickbay". A release on Blu-ray Disc for season two occurred on August 20, 2013.
