= Bounty (Star Trek: Enterprise) =

- Star Trek: Enterprise episode
- Episode no.: Season 2 Episode 25
- Directed by: Roxann Dawson
- Story by: Rick Berman; Brannon Braga
- Teleplay by: Hans Tobeason; Mike Sussman; Phyllis Strong
- Production code: 225
- Original air date: May 14, 2003

Guest appearances
- Jordan Lund - Skalaar; Robert O'Reilly - Kago-Darr; Ed O'Ross - Gaavrin; Michael Garvey - Klingon Captain Goroth; Louis Ortiz - Klingon Warrior

Episode chronology
← Previous "First Flight"	Next → "The Expanse"
- Star Trek: Enterprise season 2

"Bounty" is the 51st episode of Star Trek: Enterprise, the 25th episode of the second season. It presents the Tellarite aliens, seen previously in "Journey to Babel" of the original series. There is a Pon Farr sub-plot with T'Pol. The episode aired on UPN on May 14, 2003.

This episodes follows on from the story of "Judgment" where Captain Archer escaped a life sentence in the Rura Pente gulag. The Klingons have put up a bounty for his recapture, so various bounty hunters are pursuing him. The story arc with the Klingons continues into the next episode, "The Expanse", the season finale. In the secondary story, a bacterium infects T'Pol and induces premature Pon Farr, part of the Vulcan mating cycle, which tests the medical skill and professionalism of Dr. Phlox.

== Plot ==
The crew of the Enterprise encounters Skalaar, a Tellarite who is surprisingly friendly and offers to give them a tour of a nearby planet. Skalaar is actually a bounty hunter and abducts Captain Archer, planning to turn him over to the Klingons for payment. The Klingons have placed a substantial price on Archer's head since his escape from the Rura Penthe gulag. Archer soon learns that Skalaar plans on using the reward to buy back Tezra, his previous ship.

On Enterprise, Sub-Commander T'Pol and Doctor Phlox begin an hours-long decontamination after a recent away mission. T'Pol begins acting strangely, and begins making sexual overtures to Phlox. It appears that a microbe has activated pon farr, the Vulcan sex drive. Phlox races to find a treatment, but T'Pol's actions become more and more erratic. Finally, she knocks Phlox out and escapes from decontamination. Lieutenant Reed and a security team manage to subdue her. Later, T'Pol wakes up feeling more or less her usual self, and embarrassed by her actions, Phlox promises not to mention what happened to anyone.

Meanwhile, Skalaar runs into trouble when a rival bounty hunter tracks him down and demands that he turn over Archer. Skalaar refuses, and the rival opens fire. In the battle, Archer convinces Skalaar to temporarily free him, and the two men land on a nearby planet to make repairs. As they work, Archer learns more about Skalaar's circumstances. Skalaar turns Archer over to the Klingons as planned, but ends up receiving only two-thirds of the promised reward. In revenge, he alerts Enterprise to the location of the Klingon ship, and Archer escapes in an escape pod. Enterprise arrives and retrieves Archer, damaging the Klingon ship enough to end the battle. Some time later, Skalaar contacts Archer and warns that the price on Archer's head will probably double. Grateful, Archer bids Skalaar farewell.

== Production ==
Michael Westmore had previously expressed interest in revisiting the design of alien characters from the original series, (Note: Journey to Babel) saying doing a better Tellarite was a goal, but that the design would depend on the script.

The script was written by Hans Tobeason with Mike Sussman and Phyllis Strong. Tobeason previously wrote for shows such as SeaQuest DSV, Now and Again and Birds of Prey. The story concept came from producers Rick Berman and Brannon Braga. This was director Roxann Dawson's fifth episode of Enterprise, and third episode of season 2. Production started on Wednesday, May 19, 2003 and ran until May 27.

Robert O'Reilly who played the bounty hunter Kago-Darr, previously played the Klingon Chancellor Gowron in Star Trek The Next Generation and Deep Space Nine. He was particularly grateful for the job, having recently become father to triplets at the time. Jordan Lund who plays the bounty hunter Skalaar, previously appeared in Star Trek: The Next Generation as a Klingon and in Deep Space Nine as a Bajoran. His Klingon character Kulge was killed by Gowron. The second Tellarite, Skalaar's brother Gaavrin, was played by Ed O'Ross.

== Reception ==
"Bounty" was first broadcast on the UPN in the United States, on May 14, 2003. It was aired as part of a double bill directly after "First Flight". According to Nielsen Media Research it had a ratings share of 2.3/2 and was watched by 3.54 million viewers. Both episodes saw a reduction in viewing figures compared to previous weeks, which was attributed to them being broadcast at the same time as the series finale of Dawson's Creek on The WB. "Bounty" received a lower ratings share of the two episode but slightly higher audience numbers.

Jamahl Epsicokhan of Jammer's Reviews gave the episode 1.5 out of 4. He compared the main bounty hunter plot to Midnight Run but found it "pedestrian and obvious" complaining that yet again this season Archer was thrown in a cell. He was highly critical of the contrived and gratuitously sexualized subplot. Michelle Erica Green, writing for TrekNation, said the episode was not as bad as she had expected it to be, the T'Pol subplot having been heavily advertised in advance. She found the main plot too similar to the episode "Canamar" calling it a boring and derivative wrongful-imprisonment storyline. The T'Pol subplot did not disgust her as much as several Star Trek: Voyager episodes. Green recognizes that she was not the target audience for this but was critical that we don't learn anything from it and that it was unlikely to make the show's rating rise because it was not going convince anyone to watch Enterprise regularly. Green did praise the Tellarite makeup and appreciated the continuation of the Klingon storyline, but said that it was wasted on this episode. Baz Greenland of The Digital Fix said the episode was a travesty. He called the main plot "okay" but was critical of the subplot the exploitative sexualization of Jolene Blalock. He rated it the worst episode of the season, and concluded: "Embarrassing and unforgivable at every level..." IGN reviewed season 2 and criticized this episode, saying it came off as an example of "cheap pandering" to fanboys. In his 2022 rewatch, Keith DeCandido of Tor.com gave it 2 out of 10.

== See also ==
- Star Trek VI: The Undiscovered Country (Theatrical debut of Rura Penthe with Kirk in 1991)
