= Judgment (Star Trek: Enterprise) =

- Star Trek: Enterprise episode
- Episode no.: Season 2 Episode 19
- Directed by: James L. Conway
- Story by: Taylor Elmore; David A. Goodman
- Teleplay by: David A. Goodman
- Production code: 219
- Original air date: April 9, 2003

Guest appearances
- J. G. Hertzler - Advocate Kolos; Granville Van Dusen - Klingon Magistrate; John Vickery - Prosecutor Orak; Daniel Riordan - Duras; Helen Cates - Klingon First Officer; D.J. Lockhart - Klingon Cell Guard; Danny Kolker - Klingon Rura Penthe Guard

Episode chronology
← Previous "The Crossing"	Next → "Horizon"
- Star Trek: Enterprise season 2

"Judgment" is the nineteenth episode of the second season of Star Trek: Enterprise, the forty-fifth episode overall. It first aired April 9, 2003, on UPN.

Captain Archer appears before a Klingon tribunal, charged with attacking a Klingon space ship and inciting a rebellion.

This episode guest stars J. G. Hertzler as a Klingon lawyer. Bakula picked this episode as a favorite of his.

== Plot ==
Captain Archer finds himself in the witness stand of a Klingon tribunal where he's charged with both aiding rebels opposed to the Empire and of attacking a Klingon ship. In his cell, under the pretext of needing to be checked for contagion, Archer is visited by Doctor Phlox, who gives Archer an update that efforts to have him released are under way. Archer tells Phlox to relay a message, that no matter what the outcome, Sub-Commander T'Pol will leave orbit and keep the Enterprise's crew safe. In the chamber, the prosecutor, Orak, faces off against Archer's advocate, a veteran of the courts named Kolos.

Orak calls as his first witness Second Weapons Officer (formerly Captain) Duras to testify—a process in which Archer is not allowed to interject. Duras then relates a biased tale of himself confronting a belligerent Archer, who supposedly fires on the Klingon ship first. Archer cannot hold his tongue, and is quickly silenced with pain sticks by the tribunal guards. Back in the cells, Kolos is tasked with offering Archer a deal. Rather than plea bargain, Archer insists that Kolos actually work harder to put up a valid defense. In response, Kolos relates how the judiciary used to be about the law and honor, but more recently the warrior mindset meant that victories became the accepted norm.

Kolos re-enters the court and advocates for Archer's right to testify based on an archaic judicial charter. Archer is permitted to relate his tale of helping the neglected refugees and merely damaging the Klingon warship, giving Kolos the chance to relate the numerous times Archer has helped the Empire in the past. Archer is still found guilty and sentenced to life on the Klingon dilithium mining planet of Rura Penthe. Kolos protests, and is himself sentenced to a year at Rura Penthe. Meanwhile, T'Pol uses irregular back-door diplomatic channels and bribes to arrange to get the captain back. Kolos remains, deciding to obey the law he has served for so long with honor.

== Continuity ==
Archer's escape from Rura Penthe is referred to in the 51st episode "Bounty", when he is captured by a bounty hunter. In the season finale, "The Expanse", there is a subplot where he is again pursued by Duras.

This episode noted for featuring Rura Penthe and also connecting to the Duras plot.

In the script, the name of the Klingon colony where the tribunal takes place, was revealed to be Narendra III, which was an important plot point in the 1990 Star Trek: The Next Generation episode, "Yesterday's Enterprise".

In the 1991 film, Star Trek VI: The Undiscovered Country, Captain Kirk and Doctor McCoy are held prisoner by the Klingons, and sentenced to work in the mines of Rura Penthe. The Klingon courtroom in "Judgment" was also made to look like the one from this film, and the judge also bangs a spherical metal gavel that creates sparks.

== Production ==
James Conway returns to direct, his last episode having been the Enterprise pilot "Broken Bow". The script was written by David Goodman, based on an idea from himself and newcomer Taylor Elmore. Goodman said the episode was fun to write, and that he included as many references as possible to the Klingons from Star Trek: The Next Generation and most of them remain in the final episode. The episode was an attempt to reconcile how the Klingons in The Original Series seemed different from the Klingons in The Next Generation. Goodman explained that the Klingons were undergoing a cultural shift, but deeper under the surface was the basis for what we later learn about the Klingon culture. Goodman would explore the topic further in his book Star Trek Federation: The First 150 Years. Originally, the crew would have rescued Archer from a prison transport rather than Rura Penthe, but Brannon Braga liked "Archer on a prison transport" concept so much he wanted to make it into a separate episode, which eventually became "Canamar". Filming took place from January 17 to 28.

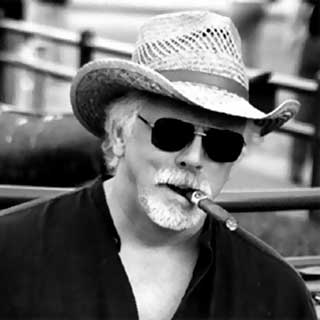
J. G. Hertzler guest starred as Advocate Kolos

Guest star J. G. Hertzler portrayed Advocate Kolos. Hertzler is known for playing the Klingon General Martok in Deep Space Nine and many other Star Trek roles. He also previously worked with Scott Bakula on Quantum Leap in the episode "Sea Bride". The episode was directed by James L. Conway who cast Hertzler as Martok in Deep Space Nine. Hertzler was required to audition for the part and he was surprised to get the role, but he grew to like Kolos immensely and was pleased to get the chance to work with Scott Bakula again. Hertzler said the Klingon makeup still took about 3 hours, and he worked 3 days that were as long as 16 to 18 hours, but he loved it. The Klingon Magistrate is played by Granville Van Dusen who returns in the season 3 episode "Proving Ground" as an Andorian.

== Reception ==
"Judgment" first aired April 9, 2003 on UPN. According to Nielsen Media Research it was rated 2.5/4 and was watched by 3.7 million viewers.

In his 2022 rewatch, Keith DeCandido of Tor.com gave it 10 out of 10. Noting that he has himself authored books about the Klingons he says "it shouldn't surprise anyone that I adore this episode", firstly for addressing the obvious point that it is not possible that all Klingons could be warriors, and showing what was implied but never stated by previous stories. He praises the performances and gravitas of the three guest stars.

Scott Bakula said he picked it as his favorite episode because he loved the simplicity of it, the tremendous guest cast, and the moral lesson of a few people standing up and making a difference.

The A.V. Club gave this episode an honorable mention in their list of recommended Enterprise television episodes. Den of Geek recommended this episode to understand the importance of the character Kolos to the show, praising "great acting" by actor J.G. Hertzler and said the episode has a "thought provoking" narrative about culture. The Digital Fix noted this episode for its focus on Klingons, but showing the audience a different side to the aliens with a "brilliant performance" by J.G. Hertlzer as a Klingon lawyer. They felt the episode reminded them of scenes from Star Trek VI: The Undiscovered Country, and noting that it is set on Rura Penthe which was also featured in that theatrical film.

== Home media release ==
"Judgment" was first released for home media use on DVD as part of the second series box set of Star Trek: Enterprise. The episode also featured as one of the three Enterprise episodes on the Star Trek Fan Collective DVD Set "Captain's Log", the episode was selected by Bakula. A release on Blu-ray Disc for season two occurred on August 20, 2013.
