= Hans Tobeason =

Hans Tobeason is an American television screenwriter and executive producer. He created the Freedom science fiction series and was writer and co-executive producer for Birds of Prey. He also co-wrote the teleplay for the Star Trek: Enterprise second season episode Bounty.

For his first professional television work, Tobeason was nominated with David J. Burke for the 1993 Writers Guild of America Award for the pilot episode, "The Box," for the TriBeCa anthology series drama.

He graduated from Harvard College in 1981.
