= The Expanse (Star Trek: Enterprise episode) =

- Star Trek: Enterprise episode
- A crewman in Engineering during the Enterprise's battle with the Klingons.
- Episode no.: Season 2 Episode 26
- Directed by: Allan Kroeker
- Written by: Rick Berman; Brannon Braga
- Production code: 226
- Original air date: May 21, 2003

Guest appearances
- John Fleck - Silik; Vaughn Armstrong - Admiral Forrest; Gary Graham - Ambassador Soval; Daniel Riordan - Duras; James Horan - Humanoid Figure; Bruce Wright - Doctor Fer'at; Dan Desmond - Klingon Chancellor; Josh Cruze - Captain Ramirez; David Figlioli - Klingon Crewman; L. Sidney - Klingon Crewman #2; Gary Bullock - Klingon Council Member

Episode chronology
← Previous "Bounty"	Next → "The Xindi"
- Star Trek: Enterprise season 2

"The Expanse" is the fifty-second episode of Star Trek: Enterprise, the twenty-sixth episode and finale of the second season. The episode aired on UPN on May 21, 2003. The episode launched a change of direction for the series, starting with a cataclysmic attack on the Star Trek version of Earth and introducing a new alien foe, the Xindi.

This episode set the foundation for the season-spanning Xindi story arc, encompassing all of season three and the first three episodes of season four. The story line continues in the season three opening episode, "The Xindi".

== Plot ==
In April 2153, an alien probe attacks Earth, cutting a destructive swath 4,000 km long, from Florida to Venezuela, killing millions, including Commander Tucker's younger sister, Elizabeth. Enterprise is recalled to Earth by Admiral Forrest. On the way, Captain Archer is briefly kidnapped by the Suliban Cabal. He accuses the Suliban leader, Silik, of being responsible for the Earth attack, but Silik professes ignorance. The Cabal's sponsor, a human from the distant future, appearing as a vague, shadowy figure, informs Archer about the Temporal Cold War and the Xindi, the race that attacked Earth. He claims the Xindi have been told by another Cold War faction that they will be destroyed in 400 years by Humans.

Enterprise is again ambushed, attacked by a Klingon Bird of Prey commanded by Captain Duras at the behest of the Klingon High Council. Fortunately, three other Starfleet vessels arrive, forcing it to retreat. Archer relates his encounters to Starfleet and the Vulcan High Command that the Xindi of the present are trying to preempt their destruction in the future. Ambassador Soval is dubious of Archer's temporal war argument, and tries to dissuade him from venturing into the Delphic Expanse (where they traced the Xindi probe's origin), a dangerous section of space that once destroyed the Vulcan ship Vaankara.

Archer, acting on advice from the shadowy informant, scans the crashed probe, revealing a component with an unmistakable date stamp placing the date of construction at 420 years in the future. Starfleet orders Archer to take Enterprise to the Expanse to try to stop the Xindi. Starfleet refits the Enterprise with improved weapons and shields, and a detachment of MACOs (Military Assault Command Operations soldiers) are stationed aboard for the mission.

Ambassador Soval informs T'Pol that her assignment on Enterprise has been terminated by the High Command, who deem this to be purely a human matter. T'Pol logically points out that if they needed a Vulcan on the Enterprise before, they are in greater need now, so her assignment should be continued. She debates, but does not disobey. Enterprise begins their journey towards the Expanse, and to return T'Pol to Vulcan. They are again attacked by Duras, but Archer retaliates using his new torpedoes at 10% and then 50% strength. The Klingon warbird limps away. T'Pol reveals she has resigned from the Vulcan High Command and wishes to stay on the ship. After she tells Archer that "you need me,” the detour to Vulcan is cancelled.

After a three-month journey, Enterprise nears the Expanse and is again attacked by Duras. Archer decides to use the 100% setting on his torpedoes, and Duras' ship is destroyed. The Enterprise continues on into the Delphic expanse.

== Production ==
The episode was written Rick Berman and Brannon Braga. It was directed by Allan Kroeker, who also directed the previous season finale "Shockwave".

== Reception ==
In his 2023 rewatch, Keith DeCandido of Tor.com gave it 3 out of 10.

In 2016, Radio Times ranked the Xindi attack on Earth, the 45th greatest scene of all Star Trek film and television productions. They note the event re-energized the show and launched a season long story arc. They note, "Then came a cliffhanger episode that began with a devastating sight: an alien probe cutting a swathe of destruction across Earth.

In 2019, Den of Geek said this was an important episode for understanding T'Pol.

=== Awards ===
This episode was nominated for the 2003 Emmy Award for Outstanding Special Visual Effects for a Series.

== Novelization ==
A novelized adaptation of the episode by J.M. Dillard was published as The Expanse by Pocket Books in trade paperback format in October 2003. The novel also adapted the following episode, "The Xindi".

== Home media release ==
This episode was released for home media use on DVD as part of the second series box set of Star Trek: Enterprise. Season Two was released on Blu-ray Disc August 20, 2013.
