= André Bormanis =

American television producer and writer

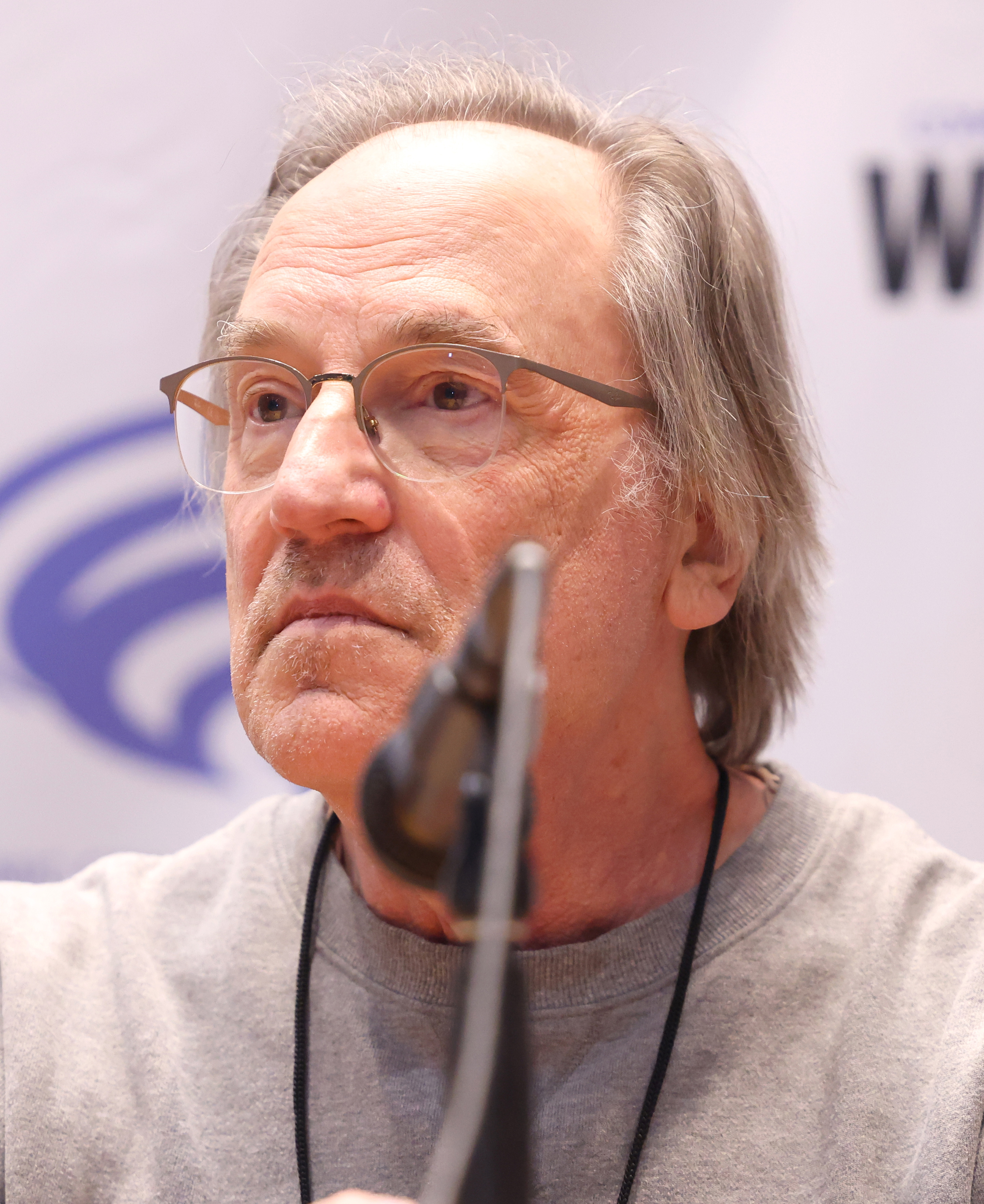
- Bormanis in 2025
- Born: February 13, 1959 (age 67); Chicago, Illinois
- Citizenship: USA
- Education: Physics (B.S.); Science, Technology, and Public Policy (M.A.)
- Alma mater: University of Arizona; George Washington University
- Occupations: Television writer and producer

Andre Bormanis (born February 13, 1959) is an American television producer, screenwriter, and author of the book Star Trek: Science Logs. Bormanis is most notable for his involvement in the long-running Star Trek franchise, and was the science consultant on Star Trek: The Next Generation, Star Trek: Deep Space Nine, Star Trek: Voyager and Star Trek: Enterprise. He also wrote a number of episodes of the Star Trek: Voyager series and became a writer and producer on the Enterprise series, as well as acting as a science and technical advisor on two of the Next Generation films.

He was also a writer and producer of the CBS science fiction drama Threshold; the CBS drama series Eleventh Hour; a writer for Tron: Uprising; and the director of scientific research for Cosmos: A Spacetime Odyssey. In 2017, Bormanis became a science consultant and a writer-producer on The Orville.

== Television and film career ==
=== Star Trek ===
Bormanis became the science consultant for Star Trek: The Next Generation and went on to work in that capacity for Star Trek: Deep Space Nine and Star Trek: Voyager. In his role he acted as an advisor for the screenwriters, in order to ensure that the correct scientific principles are included in the episodes. Whilst working on Voyager, he co-wrote the episode "Nightingale". He has also been a writer of several episodes of Star Trek: Enterprise, such as "Silent Enemy", "Extinction", and "The Communicator". He has since written the book Star Trek: Science Logs.

=== Other work ===
Following his work on Enterprise, he joined fellow Star Trek alumnus Brannon Braga on his new series Threshold on CBS. It was cancelled after thirteen episodes.

He has set up a production company called Sky by Night Productions. His most recent work has been writing for the television series The Orville. He serves on the board of directors of the Griffith Observatory Foundation.

== Personal life ==
Bormanis received a degree in physics from the University of Arizona in 1981. In 1994, following a NASA Space Grant Fellowship from the District of Columbia Space Grant Consortium, he gained a master's degree in science, technology and public policy from George Washington University. In addition to his television work, he has worked as a consultant to the San Juan Institute and the Planetary Society in Pasadena, California.
