= Chris Black (screenwriter) =

American television producer and screenwriter

Chris Black is a screenwriter and television producer, from Toledo, Ohio. Black is known for writing and producing mainly science fiction and action series, although he also was a part of the production team of the comedy-drama Desperate Housewives during its first two seasons.

Black has produced and written episodes of Cleopatra 2525, The Huntress, Sliders, Star Trek: Enterprise, Hawaii and Standoff. In addition, he has written episodes of several other shows, including Weird Science, Xena: Warrior Princess and Vanished. He also co-wrote the 1997 action movie Masterminds starring Patrick Stewart.

In 2022, Black and Matt Fraction co-created Monarch: Legacy of Monsters for Apple TV+. Black also serves as showrunner.

== Accolades ==
Year	Award	Category	Nominee(s)	Result	Ref.
2022	Peabody Awards	Entertainment	Severance	Won	
