= List of Star Trek: Enterprise episodes =

Star Trek: Enterprise is an American science fiction television series that originally aired on the UPN network from September 26, 2001 to May 13, 2005. Until the episode "Extinction" towards the start of the third season, the series was called simply Enterprise without the Star Trek prefix. The series aired for 97 (DVD and original broadcast) or 98 (syndicated) episodes across four seasons, centering on the adventures of the 22nd century starship Enterprise. They are the first deep space explorers in Starfleet, using the first Warp 5 equipped vessel. It was set within the universe of the Star Trek franchise, with the series placed earlier in the chronology than Star Trek: The Original Series.

Following the end of Star Trek: Voyager, executive producers Rick Berman and Brannon Braga entered immediately into production on Enterprise in line with feedback from the studio. They remained sole executive producers and showrunners until the fourth season when Manny Coto took the lead on the show. He had joined the crew as co-producer during the third season. The pilot, "Broken Bow", was watched by 12.5 million viewers on the first broadcast on UPN. After the first few weeks of episodes, the ratings were considered to be solid enough and the expectation was that the series would run for seven seasons in the same manner as The Next Generation, Deep Space Nine and Voyager. However, the viewing figures began to decrease towards the end of the season. Changes were made for the third season, with the introduction of the season-long Xindi storyline. This improved the reviews that the series was receiving, but the ratings continued to decrease. Critics began to talk of giving Star Trek a break from television and suggesting that the decline was caused by overall franchise fatigue. UPN cut the 26 episode order for the third season to 24, meaning that if 24 episodes were created for the fourth season as well then they would have the 100 episodes needed for syndication. However, it was cancelled two episodes short of this target.

== Series overview ==
Season	Episodes	Originally released		Average viewers (millions)	Average rank
Season	Episodes	First released	Last released	Average viewers (millions)	Average rank
1	26	September 26, 2001	May 22, 2002	5.9	115
2	26	September 18, 2002	May 21, 2003	4.03	135
3	24	September 10, 2003	May 26, 2004	—N/a	—N/a
4	22	October 8, 2004	May 13, 2005	2.9	150

== Episodes ==
=== Season 1 (2001–02) ===
No. overall	No. in season	Title	In-universe date	Directed by	Written by	Original release date	Prod. code	U.S. viewers (millions)
1	1	"Broken Bow"	April 16, 2151	James L. Conway	Rick Berman & Brannon Braga	September 26, 2001	40358-721	12.54
2	2	"Broken Bow"	April 16, 2151	James L. Conway	Rick Berman & Brannon Braga	September 26, 2001	40358-721	12.54
3	3	"Fight or Flight"	May 6, 2151	Allan Kroeker	Rick Berman & Brannon Braga	October 3, 2001	40358-003	9.18
4	4	"Strange New World"	Unknown	David Livingston	S : Rick Berman & Brannon Braga; T : Mike Sussman & Phyllis Strong	October 10, 2001	40358-004	7.81
5	5	"Unexpected"	Unknown	Mike Vejar	Rick Berman & Brannon Braga	October 17, 2001	40358-005	8.16
6	6	"Terra Nova"	Unknown	LeVar Burton	S : Rick Berman & Brannon Braga; T : Antoinette Stella	October 24, 2001	40358-006	8.35
7	7	"The Andorian Incident"	June 19, 2151	Roxann Dawson	S : Rick Berman, Brannon Braga; S/T : Fred Dekker	October 31, 2001	40358-007	7.19
8	8	"Breaking the Ice"	Unknown	Terry Windell	Andre Jacquemetton & Maria Jacquemetton	November 7, 2001	40358-008	7.36
9	9	"Civilization"	July 31, 2151	Mike Vejar	Mike Sussman & Phyllis Strong	November 14, 2001	40358-009	7.14
10	10	"Fortunate Son"	Unknown	LeVar Burton	James Duff	November 21, 2001	40358-010	6.11
11	11	"Cold Front"	September 12, 2151	Robert Duncan McNeill	Stephen Beck & Tim Finch	November 28, 2001	40358-011	7.33
12	12	"Silent Enemy"	September 1, 2151	Winrich Kolbe	André Bormanis	December 12, 2001	40358-012	6.11
13	13	"Dear Doctor"	Unknown	James A. Contner	Andre Jacquemetton & Maria Jacquemetton	January 16, 2002	40358-013	5.65
14	14	"Sleeping Dogs"	Unknown	Les Landau	Fred Dekker	January 23, 2002	40358-014	6.50
15	15	"Shadows of P'Jem"	Unknown	Mike Vejar	S : Rick Berman & Brannon Braga; T : Mike Sussman & Phyllis Strong	February 6, 2002	40358-015	6.05
16	16	"Shuttlepod One"	November 9, 2151	David Livingston	Rick Berman & Brannon Braga	February 13, 2002	40358-016	5.33
17	17	"Fusion"	Unknown	Rob Hedden	S : Rick Berman & Brannon Braga; T : Phyllis Strong & Mike Sussman	February 20, 2002	40358-017	4.49
18	18	"Rogue Planet"	Unknown	Allan Kroeker	S : Rick Berman & Brannon Braga; S/T : Chris Black	February 27, 2002	40358-018	4.69
19	19	"Acquisition"	Unknown	James Whitmore Jr.	S : Rick Berman & Brannon Braga; T : Maria Jacquemetton & Andre Jacquemetton	March 27, 2002	40358-019	5.45
20	20	"Oasis"	Unknown	Jim Charleston	S : Rick Berman & Brannon Braga; S/T : Stephen Beck	April 3, 2002	40358-020	5.64
21	21	"Detained"	Unknown	David Livingston	S : Rick Berman & Brannon Braga; T : Phyllis Strong & Mike Sussman	April 24, 2002	40358-021	4.88
22	22	"Vox Sola"	Unknown	Roxann Dawson	S : Rick Berman & Brannon Braga; S/T : Fred Dekker	May 1, 2002	40358-022	5.40
23	23	"Fallen Hero"	February 9, 2152	Patrick Norris	S : Rick Berman, Brannon Braga & Chris Black; T : Alan Cross	May 8, 2002	40358-023	5.34
24	24	"Desert Crossing"	February 12, 2152	David Straiton	S : Rick Berman & Brannon Braga; S/T : André Bormanis	May 8, 2002	40358-024	4.68
25	25	"Two Days and Two Nights"	February 18, 2152	Michael Dorn	S : Rick Berman & Brannon Braga; T : Chris Black	May 15, 2002	40358-025	5.26
26	26	"Shockwave, Part I"	Unknown	Allan Kroeker	Rick Berman & Brannon Braga	May 22, 2002	40358-026	5.28

"Broken Bow" aired as a two-hour episode on UPN. When the series entered syndication, it began airing as a two-part episode.

=== Season 2 (2002–03) ===
No. overall	No. in season	Title	In-universe date	Directed by	Written by	Original release date	Prod. code	U.S. viewers (millions)
27	1	"Shockwave: Part 2"	Unknown	Allan Kroeker	Rick Berman & Brannon Braga	September 18, 2002	40358-028	4.89
28	2	"Carbon Creek"	April 12, 2152	James A. Contner	S : Rick Berman & Brannon Braga & Dan O'Shannon; T : Chris Black	September 25, 2002	40358-027	4.84
29	3	"Minefield"	Unknown	James A. Contner	John Shiban	October 2, 2002	40358-029	5.25
30	4	"Dead Stop"	Unknown	Roxann Dawson	Mike Sussman & Phyllis Strong	October 9, 2002	40358-031	5.41
31	5	"A Night in Sickbay"	Unknown	David Straiton	Rick Berman & Brannon Braga	October 16, 2002	40358-030	6.25
32	6	"Marauders"	Unknown	Mike Vejar	S : Rick Berman & Brannon Braga; T : David Wilcox	October 30, 2002	40358-032	5.60
33	7	"The Seventh"	Unknown	David Livingston	Rick Berman & Brannon Braga	November 6, 2002	40358-033	4.82
34	8	"The Communicator"	Unknown	James A. Contner	S : Rick Berman & Brannon Braga; T : André Bormanis	November 13, 2002	40358-034	4.46
35	9	"Singularity"	August 14, 2152	Patrick Norris	Chris Black	November 20, 2002	40358-035	4.83
36	10	"Vanishing Point"	Unknown	David Straiton	Rick Berman & Brannon Braga	November 27, 2002	40358-036	3.78
37	11	"Precious Cargo"	September 12, 2152	David Livingston	S : Rick Berman & Brannon Braga; T : David A. Goodman	December 11, 2002	40358-037	4.67
38	12	"The Catwalk"	September 18, 2152	Mike Vejar	Mike Sussman & Phyllis Strong	December 18, 2002	40358-038	4.73
39	13	"Dawn"	Unknown	Roxann Dawson	John Shiban	January 8, 2003	40358-039	3.99
40	14	"Stigma"	Unknown	David Livingston	Rick Berman & Brannon Braga	February 5, 2003	40358-040	4.40
41	15	"Cease Fire"	Unknown	David Straiton	Chris Black	February 12, 2003	40358-041	4.78
42	16	"Future Tense"	Unknown	James Whitmore Jr.	Mike Sussman & Phyllis Strong	February 19, 2003	40358-042	4.62
43	17	"Canamar"	Unknown	Allan Kroeker	John Shiban	February 26, 2003	40358-043	4.10
44	18	"The Crossing"	Unknown	David Livingston	S : André Bormanis; S/T : Rick Berman & Brannon Braga	April 2, 2003	40358-044	3.85
45	19	"Judgment"	Unknown	James L. Conway	S : Taylor Elmore; S/T : David A. Goodman	April 9, 2003	40358-045	3.69
46	20	"Horizon"	January 10, 2153	James A. Contner	André Bormanis	April 16, 2003	40358-046	3.36
47	21	"The Breach"	Unknown	Robert Duncan McNeill	S : Daniel McCarthy; T : Chris Black & John Shiban	April 23, 2003	40358-047	3.19
48	22	"Cogenitor"	Unknown	LeVar Burton	Rick Berman & Brannon Braga	April 30, 2003	40358-048	4.08
49	23	"Regeneration"	March 1, 2153	David Livingston	Mike Sussman & Phyllis Strong	May 7, 2003	40358-049	4.12
50	24	"First Flight"	Unknown	LeVar Burton	John Shiban & Chris Black	May 14, 2003	40358-050	3.30
51	25	"Bounty"	March 21, 2153	Roxann Dawson	S : Rick Berman & Brannon Braga; T : Hans Tobeason and Mike Sussman & Phyllis Strong	May 14, 2003	40358-051	3.54
52	26	"The Expanse"	April 24, 2153	Allan Kroeker	Rick Berman & Brannon Braga	May 21, 2003	40358-052	3.88

=== Season 3 (2003–04) ===
No. overall	No. in season	Title	In-universe date	Directed by	Written by	Original release date	Prod. code	U.S. viewers (millions)
53	1	"The Xindi"	Unknown	Allan Kroeker	Rick Berman & Brannon Braga	September 17, 2003	40358-053	4.07
54	2	"Anomaly"	Unknown	David Straiton	Mike Sussman	September 24, 2003	40358-054	4.29
55	3	"Extinction"	Unknown	LeVar Burton	André Bormanis	October 1, 2003	40358-055	4.00
56	4	"Rajiin"	Unknown	Mike Vejar	S : Paul Brown; T : Chris Black; S/T : Brent V. Friedman	October 8, 2003	40358-056	4.51
57	5	"Impulse"	Unknown	David Livingston	S : Terry Matalas; S/T : Jonathan Fernandez	October 15, 2003	40358-057	4.17
58	6	"Exile"	Unknown	Roxann Dawson	Phyllis Strong	October 22, 2003	40358-058	3.46
59	7	"The Shipment"	Unknown	David Straiton	Chris Black & Brent V. Friedman	October 29, 2003	40358-059	3.70
60	8	"Twilight"	Unknown	Robert Duncan McNeill	Mike Sussman	November 5, 2003	40358-060	4.06
61	9	"North Star"	Unknown	David Straiton	David A. Goodman	November 12, 2003	40358-061	3.88
62	10	"Similitude"	Unknown	LeVar Burton	Manny Coto	November 19, 2003	40358-062	4.59
63	11	"Carpenter Street"	Unknown	Mike Vejar	Rick Berman & Brannon Braga	November 26, 2003	40358-063	3.71
64	12	"Chosen Realm"	Unknown	Roxann Dawson	Manny Coto	January 14, 2004	40358-064	3.93
65	13	"Proving Ground"	December 6, 2153	David Livingston	Chris Black	January 28, 2004	40358-065	3.44
66	14	"Stratagem"	December 12, 2153	Mike Vejar	S : Terry Matalas; T : Mike Sussman	February 4, 2004	40358-066	4.07
67	15	"Harbinger"	December 27, 2153	David Livingston	S : Rick Berman & Brannon Braga; T : Manny Coto	February 11, 2004	40358-067	3.95
68	16	"Doctor's Orders"	Unknown	Roxann Dawson	Chris Black	February 18, 2004	40358-068	3.73
69	17	"Hatchery"	January 8, 2154	Michael Grossman	S : Mike Sussman; S/T : André Bormanis	February 25, 2004	40358-069	3.52
70	18	"Azati Prime"	Unknown	Allan Kroeker	S : Rick Berman, Brannon Braga; S/T : Manny Coto	March 31, 2004	40358-070	3.78
71	19	"Damage"	Unknown	James L. Conway	Phyllis Strong	April 21, 2004	40358-071	2.86
72	20	"The Forgotten"	Unknown	LeVar Burton	Chris Black & David A. Goodman	April 28, 2004	40358-072	3.35
73	21	"E²"	Unknown	Roxann Dawson	Mike Sussman	May 5, 2004	40358-073	3.25
74	22	"The Council"	February 12, 2154	David Livingston	Manny Coto	May 12, 2004	40358-074	3.41
75	23	"Countdown"	February 13, 2154	Robert Duncan McNeill	André Bormanis & Chris Black	May 19, 2004	40358-075	3.46
76	24	"Zero Hour"	February 14, 2154	Allan Kroeker	Rick Berman & Brannon Braga	May 26, 2004	40358-076	3.91

=== Season 4 (2004–05) ===
No. overall	No. in season	Title	In-universe date	Directed by	Written by	Original release date	Prod. code	U.S. viewers (millions)
77	1	"Storm Front"	Unknown	Allan Kroeker	Manny Coto	October 6, 2004	40358-077	2.89
78	2	"Storm Front, Part II"	Unknown	David Straiton	Manny Coto	October 13, 2004	40358-078	3.11
79	3	"Home"	Unknown	Allan Kroeker	Mike Sussman	October 20, 2004	40358-079	3.16
80	4	"Borderland"	May 17, 2154	David Livingston	Ken LaZebnik	October 27, 2004	40358-080	3.18
81	5	"Cold Station 12"	Unknown	Mike Vejar	Alan Brennert (Note: Credited as Michael Bryant)	November 3, 2004	40358-081	3.39
82	6	"The Augments"	May 27, 2154	LeVar Burton	Mike Sussman	November 10, 2004	40358-082	3.39
83	7	"The Forge"	Unknown	Michael Grossman	Garfield Reeves-Stevens & Judith Reeves-Stevens	November 17, 2004	40358-083	3.15
84	8	"Awakening"	Unknown	Roxann Dawson	André Bormanis	November 24, 2004	40358-084	3.38
85	9	"Kir'Shara"	Unknown	David Livingston	Mike Sussman	December 1, 2004	40358-085	3.19
86	10	"Daedalus"	Unknown	David Straiton	Alan Brennert & Ken LaZebnik	January 12, 2005	40358-086	3.03
87	11	"Observer Effect"	Unknown	Mike Vejar	Garfield Reeves-Stevens & Judith Reeves-Stevens	January 19, 2005	40358-087	2.76
88	12	"Babel One"	November 12, 2154	David Straiton	Mike Sussman & André Bormanis	January 26, 2005	40358-088	2.53
89	13	"United"	November 15, 2154	David Livingston	S : Manny Coto; T : Judith Reeves-Stevens & Garfield Reeves-Stevens	February 2, 2005	40358-089	2.81
90	14	"The Aenar"	Unknown	Mike Vejar	S : Manny Coto; T : André Bormanis	February 9, 2005	40358-090	3.17
91	15	"Affliction"	November 27, 2154	Michael Grossman	S : Manny Coto; T : Mike Sussman	February 16, 2005	40358-091	3.17
92	16	"Divergence"	Unknown	David Barrett	Garfield Reeves-Stevens & Judith Reeves-Stevens	February 23, 2005	40358-092	2.96
93	17	"Bound"	December 27, 2154	Allan Kroeker	Manny Coto	April 13, 2005	40358-093	2.56
94	18	"In a Mirror, Darkly"	January 13, 2155	James L. Conway	Mike Sussman	April 20, 2005	40358-094	2.59
95	19	"In a Mirror, Darkly"	January 18, 2155	Marvin V. Rush	S : Manny Coto; T : Mike Sussman	April 27, 2005	40358-095	2.92
96	20	"Demons"	January 19, 2155	LeVar Burton	Manny Coto	May 4, 2005	40358-096	3.01
97	21	"Terra Prime"	January 22, 2155	Marvin V. Rush	S : André Bormanis; T : Manny Coto; S/T : Judith Reeves-Stevens, Garfield Reeves-Stevens	May 11, 2005	40358-097	3.80
98	22	"These Are the Voyages..."	47457.1 (Note: Set during "The Pegasus".)	Allan Kroeker	Rick Berman & Brannon Braga	May 18, 2005	40358-098	3.80

== Ratings ==
Star Trek: Enterprise : U.S. viewers per episode (millions)

Season	Episode number																									
Season	1	2	3	4	5	6	7	8	9	10	11	12	13	14	15	16	17	18	19	20	21	22	23	24	25	26
1	12.54	12.54	9.18	7.81	8.16	8.35	7.19	7.36	7.14	6.11	7.33	6.11	5.65	6.50	6.05	5.33	4.49	4.69	5.45	5.64	4.88	5.40	5.34	4.68	5.26	5.28
2	4.89	4.84	5.25	5.41	6.25	5.60	4.82	4.46	4.83	3.78	4.67	4.73	3.99	4.40	4.78	4.62	4.10	3.65	3.69	3.36	3.19	4.08	4.12	3.30	3.54	3.88
3	4.10	4.29	4.00	4.51	4.17	3.46	3.70	4.06	3.88	4.59	3.71	3.93	3.44	4.07	3.95	3.73	3.52	3.78	2.86	3.35	3.25	3.41	3.46	3.91	–	
4	2.89	3.11	3.16	3.18	3.39	3.39	3.15	3.38	3.19	3.03	2.76	2.53	2.81	3.17	3.17	2.96	2.56	2.59	2.92	3.01	3.80	3.80	–			

Audience measurement performed by Nielsen Media Research

== See also ==
- Lists of Star Trek episodes
