= E² =

- Star Trek: Enterprise episode
- Episode no.: Season 3 Episode 21
- Directed by: Roxann Dawson
- Written by: Michael Sussman
- Production code: 321
- Original air date: May 5, 2004

Guest appearances
- Randy Oglesby – Degra; Tucker Smallwood – Xindi-Primate; Rick Worthy – Jannar; Tess Lina – Karyn Archer; David Andrews – Lorian; Tom Schanley – Greer; Steve Truitt – Crewman No. 1

Episode chronology
| ← Previous "The Forgotten" | Next → "The Council" |
- Star Trek: Enterprise season 3

"E²" (pronounced "E-Squared") is the seventy-third episode of the American science fiction television series Star Trek: Enterprise, the twenty-first episode of season three. It first aired on May 5, 2004, on UPN in the United States. The episode was the fifth of the season written by Mike Sussman, and it was directed by Star Trek: Voyager alumnus Roxann Dawson, her fourth of the third season.

Set in the 22nd century, the series follows the adventures of the first Starfleet starship, Enterprise, registration NX-01. Season three of Enterprise features an ongoing story following an attack on Earth by previously unknown aliens called the Xindi. In this episode, the Enterprise encounters a version of itself that was sent 117 years into the past—now populated by the descendants of the crew as a generational ship. The two crews must work together so the modern Enterprise can access a wormhole defended by Xindi vessels.

The episode made use of the standing Enterprise sets, as well as those created for Degra's ship. Guest stars included those who had previously appeared as members of the Xindi Council, as well as several who are new to Enterprise, who appeared as members of the future Enterprise. Most scenes were filmed between February 3 and 11, 2004, with an additional special effect shoot on February 13. Reviewers compared "E²" to a number of several other episodes, including "Children of Time", "Deadlock", and "All Good Things...". The Nielsen ratings received by the episode equated to a 3.3/5% audience share.

== Plot ==
To reach the rendezvous with Degra in three days, Enterprise approaches a nebula that contains a subspace corridor defended by Kovaalan vessels. The corridor will let them traverse the distance in minutes. Suddenly, an older yet enhanced copy of Enterprise appears, captained by a half-Vulcan man named Lorian, who explains that after the Enterprise enters the corridor, it will destabilize, causing Captain Archer's version to travel 117 years into the past. Confronted with this situation, and not wanting to contaminate Earth's history, it then turns itself into a generational ship to await the Xindi crisis. Arriving on board, Lorian reveals that he is the son of Commander Tucker and Sub-Commander T'Pol. Archer also meets his great-granddaughter, Karyn Archer, who is part Ikaaran, as Enterprise will rescue her great-grandmother Esilia from a spatial-anomaly field.

Lorian, after considering his knowledge of events, believes that the wormhole must be avoided altogether. Archer and Lorian then disagree over whether to implement an engine modification to Enterprise, since there is a 22% chance that it might destroy the ship. Archer then meets old T'Pol on board old Enterprise, and considers a plan where his ship could pass through safely, due to alternative modifications she suggests. A frustrated Lorian then reveals a secret plan: to steal the newer plasma injectors from Enterprise so they can confront the Xindi in place of their ancestors.

Lorian leads a raid and successfully steals the parts, but the old Enterprise is disabled by Archer as it is about to go to warp and Lorian is put in the brig. Archer is angry at having his own method of stealing engine components used against him. Lorian reveals that he had a chance to stop the Xindi Probe from The Expanse from attacking Earth by sacrificing Enterprise, but failed because he hesitated to condemn his crew. The two captains finally agree to work towards their shared mission. Meanwhile, T'Pol meets her older self and discuss her addiction to Trelium-D and her relationship with Tucker. The older T'Pol confirms the younger's deepest fears: in Tucker, there is something bringing irrationality into her life which she can not control, but which will nurture her and have a positive irreplaceable effect on her life and spirit.

The Enterprises enter the nebula and Archer's is quickly disabled. Lorian's then tows it into the corridor using a tractor beam and turns back to attack the Kovaalan ships, saying he will follow shortly. Archer's Enterprise arrives safely, but old Enterprise never emerges and Archer wonders if, by successfully traversing the corridor, they ceased to exist. Degra arrives for their rendezvous.

== Production ==
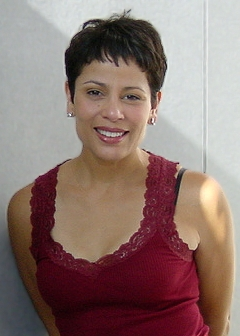
Roxann Dawson directed this episode. In addition to directing several Star Trek episodes, she starred as B'Elanna Torres on Star Trek: Voyager

The episode was the fifth written by Mike Sussman in the third season. His previous work was "Hatchery", co-written with André Bormanis. It was also the fourth episode of the season directed by Roxann Dawson. With "E²", she had directed more episodes than any other director at that point in the season, having previously worked on "Doctor's Orders", "Exile" and "Chosen Realm". Scott Bakula commented on the production of the episode: "...a great episode along the lines of 'Twilight' and 'Similitude.' It's a classic sci-fi and Star Trek episode."

Filming began on February 3, 2004, overlapping with the final day of production on the previous episode, "The Forgotten". Production required the use of the standing Enterprise sets, as well as those that represented Degra's ship. The majority of the shoot was completed on February 11, but an additional day of special effects filming with part of the cast also took place on February 13, 2004. The actors who played the members of the Xindi Council were among the guest stars who appeared in this episode: Randy Oglesby; Rick Worthy; and Tucker Smallwood. In addition, a number of guest actors appeared in Star Trek for the first time: David Andrews; Tess Lina; Tom Schanley; and Steve Truitt.

== Reception ==
"E²" first aired on May 5, 2004. It received a 3.3/5% share, meaning that 3.3 percent of all households, and 5 percent of all households watching television at the time of the broadcast saw it. These were similar ratings to the previous episode, "The Forgotten", and slightly lower than the following episode, "The Council". Compared to other shows in the same time slot, it placed sixth on the night, one place behind Smallville on The WB.

Michelle Erica Green reviewed the episode for TrekNation, saying that it "focused far more on the characters and the consequences of their contact with their descendants than it is on the vast technobabble resulting in a successful traverse of the Xindi corridor." She praised David Andrews as Lorian, calling it "a wonderful bit of casting," and felt that the character's actions mirrored those of Captain Archer previously in the series. She compared the resolution of "E²" to the Star Trek: Voyager episode "Deadlock" and the series finale of Star Trek: The Next Generation, "All Good Things...". She felt that the lack of conclusion to what happened to the future Enterprise was "very satisfying." Jamahl Epsicokhan on his website Jammer's Reviews, called the episode an "acceptable but all-too-familiar time-travel concept," and a "step down" compared to the previous three episodes of the series. He compared it to the Star Trek: Deep Space Nine episode "Children of Time", which he said "was a far superior episode because it was about our characters – astonishingly and agonizingly – choosing one destiny over another, and sacrificing a great deal in coming to that decision." He gave "E²" a rating of two and a half out of four.

Den of Geek ranked "E²" as the seventh best episode of Enterprise. The Hollywood Reporter rated it as 92nd best episode of all Star Trek up to that time, calling it a "fine episode". The Hollywood Reporter also interviewed various cast and production crew of the Star Trek franchise to determine the "100 Greatest Episodes" from across the five series, ranking "E²" as the 92nd best episode of all time.

== Home media release ==
The first home media release of "E²" was as part of the season three DVD box set, released in the United States on September 27, 2005. It subsequently became one of three Enterprise episodes to be included in the Star Trek: Alternative Realities Collective DVD set which was released in 2009. The other episodes were "In a Mirror, Darkly" and "Twilight", and also featured were other mirror universe installments including "Mirror, Mirror" and three of those from Deep Space Nine. The Blu-ray release of Enterprise was announced in early 2013, and released on January 7, 2014. This also featured deleted scenes from this episode.

== See also ==
- E (mathematical constant)
