= Star Trek: Enterprise season 3 =

Season of television series

Star Trek: Enterprise
- Season 3
- DVD and Blu-ray cover
- No. of episodes: 24

Release
- Original network: UPN
- Original release: September 10, 2003 – May 26, 2004

Season chronology
- ← Previous; Season 2 Next → Season 4

The third season of the American science fiction television series Star Trek: Enterprise commenced airing on UPN in the United States on September 10, 2003 and concluded on May 26, 2004 after 24 episodes. Set in the 22nd century, the series follows the adventures of the first Starfleet starship Enterprise, registration NX-01, and its crew.

Starting with the third episode of this season, producers added Star Trek to the name of the show, previously the series was known simply as Enterprise. The opening theme was also changed for a more instrumental version.

With UPN seeking to attract a wider audience for the show, this season the writers pivoted from the stand-alone episodes Star Trek had been known for, to a single, serialized storyline: the crew's mission to prevent the Earth being destroyed by a newly introduced alien species, the Xindi. Episodes focus on action-driven plots and a military assault team is stationed aboard as the crew faces more combat during missions away from Enterprise.

== Plot overview ==
The third season embraces a heavily serialized format initially dedicated to the search for a Xindi superweapon. It focuses on the Enterprise NX-01's mission to prevent a second, more powerful Xindi attack from destroying Earth. It also explores and develops the early encounters between Humans, Vulcans and Andorians. Additionally, main characters such as Captain Archer, Commander Tucker and Sub-Commander T'Pol receive considerable development.

== Cast ==
=== Main cast ===
- Scott Bakula as Captain Jonathan Archer
- Jolene Blalock as Sub-Commander T'Pol
- Connor Trinneer as Commander Charles "Trip" Tucker III
- Dominic Keating as Lieutenant Malcolm Reed
- Linda Park as Ensign Hoshi Sato
- Anthony Montgomery as Ensign Travis Mayweather
- John Billingsley as Doctor Phlox

=== Recurring cast ===
- Rick Worthy as Jannar (10 episodes)
- Randy Oglesby as Degra (10 episodes)
- Scott MacDonald as Commander Dolim (8 episodes)
- Tucker Smallwood as Xindi-Primate Councilor (9 episodes)
- Steven Culp as Major Hayes (5 episodes)
- Sean McGowan as Corporal Hawkins (4 episodes)
- Matt Winston as Temporal Agent Daniels (3 episodes)
- Daniel Dae Kim as Corporal Chang (3 episodes)
- Jeffrey Combs as Commander Shran (2 episodes)
- Gary Graham as Ambassador Soval (1 episode)
- Molly Brink as Lieutenant Talas (1 episode)

== Episodes ==
In the following table, episodes are listed by the order in which they aired.

No. overall	No. in season	Title	In-universe date	Directed by	Written by	Original release date	Prod. code	U.S. viewers (millions)
53	1	"The Xindi"	Unknown	Allan Kroeker	Rick Berman & Brannon Braga	September 17, 2003	40358-053	4.07
Captain Archer and Lieutenant Reed visit a mining facility in order to track down a Xindi.
54	2	"Anomaly"	Unknown	David Straiton	Mike Sussman	September 24, 2003	40358-054	4.29
The crew of Enterprise encounters the rigours of the Delphic Expanse first-hand, and deal with pirates operating from a giant cloaked alien sphere.
55	3	"Extinction"	Unknown	LeVar Burton	André Bormanis	October 1, 2003	40358-055	4.00
While pursuing the Xindi, three crew members are exposed to an alien virus and begin to mutate into Loque'eque, a long-dead alien race.
56	4	"Rajiin"	Unknown	Mike Vejar	S : Paul Brown; T : Chris Black; S/T : Brent V. Friedman	October 8, 2003	40358-056	4.51
A slave girl Archer rescues from an alien bazaar seeks refuge aboard Enterprise but betrays the crew instead.
57	5	"Impulse"	Unknown	David Livingston	S : Terry Matalas; S/T : Jonathan Fernandez	October 15, 2003	40358-057	4.17
Enterprise encounters a Vulcan ship whose crew has become unstable due to Trellium-D exposure. Sub-Commander T'Pol soon begins to exhibit the same symptoms.
58	6	"Exile"	Unknown	Roxann Dawson	Phyllis Strong	October 22, 2003	40358-058	3.46
A Beauty and the Beast-like tale involving Ensign Sato encountering a potentially helpful telepath on a deserted world.
59	7	"The Shipment"	Unknown	David Straiton	Chris Black & Brent V. Friedman	October 29, 2003	40358-059	3.70
Captain Archer learns of kemocite, a key element in a new weapon being built to destroy Earth, and seeks to follow its supply to the superweapon.
60	8	"Twilight"	Unknown	Robert Duncan McNeill	Mike Sussman	November 5, 2003	40358-060	4.06
A parasite causes Captain Archer to lose his short-term memory, and he (with the help of T'Pol and Doctor Phlox) seeks a way to change the past.
61	9	"North Star"	Unknown	David Straiton	David A. Goodman	November 12, 2003	40358-061	3.88
Investigating a planet found to be inhabited by humans, the crew find a town resembling the American "Old West".
62	10	"Similitude"	Unknown	LeVar Burton	Manny Coto	November 19, 2003	40358-062	4.59
Commander Tucker becomes comatose after an accident, and a rapid-growing clone is created for the purpose of harvesting brain tissue.
63	11	"Carpenter Street"	Unknown	Mike Vejar	Rick Berman & Brannon Braga	November 26, 2003	40358-063	3.71
With the help of Temporal Agent Daniels, Captain Archer and Sub-Commander T'Pol go back to 2004 Detroit to stop a group of Reptilians from developing a biological weapon.^{TCW}
64	12	"Chosen Realm"	Unknown	Roxann Dawson	Manny Coto	January 14, 2004	40358-064	3.93
Religious zealots seek to execute Captain Archer, for supposed acts of sphere desecration, after hijacking Enterprise.
65	13	"Proving Ground"	December 6, 2153	David Livingston	Chris Black	January 28, 2004	40358-065	3.44
Xindi scientists test their new, planet-killing weapon in an asteroid field as Captain Archer is suddenly assisted by Andorians in the Delphic Expanse.^{Fed}
66	14	"Stratagem"	December 12, 2153	Mike Vejar	S : Terry Matalas; T : Mike Sussman	February 4, 2004	40358-066	4.07
A Xindi scientist, Degra, is tricked into giving Captain Archer information about the location of the new superweapon.
67	15	"Harbinger"	December 27, 2153	David Livingston	S : Rick Berman & Brannon Braga; T : Manny Coto	February 11, 2004	40358-067	3.95
Enterprise encounters a dying alien, one of the Sphere Builders, for the first time.
68	16	"Doctor's Orders"	Unknown	Roxann Dawson	Chris Black	February 18, 2004	40358-068	3.73
As Enterprise passes through a "trans-dimensional disturbance," the crew is put into hibernation, leaving Doctor Phlox in control of the ship.
69	17	"Hatchery"	January 8, 2154	Michael Grossman	S : Mike Sussman; S/T : André Bormanis	February 25, 2004	40358-069	3.52
Captain Archer becomes overly protective of an Insectoid hatchery, to the point of endangering their mission.
70	18	"Azati Prime"	Unknown	Allan Kroeker	S : Rick Berman, Brannon Braga; S/T : Manny Coto	March 31, 2004	40358-070	3.78
Finding the superweapon on Azati Prime, Captain Archer embarks on a suicide mission to destroy it, and Enterprise suffers a devastating attack by the Xindi.^{TCW} ^{Fed}
71	19	"Damage"	Unknown	James L. Conway	Phyllis Strong	April 21, 2004	40358-071	2.86
Enterprise, now heavily damaged, seeks a warp coil from an alien vessel but is forced to steal it.
72	20	"The Forgotten"	Unknown	LeVar Burton	Chris Black & David A. Goodman	April 28, 2004	40358-072	3.35
Captain Archer deals with the loss of 18 crew members and continues negotiations with two of the five Xindi species.
73	21	"E²"	Unknown	Roxann Dawson	Mike Sussman	May 5, 2004	40358-073	3.25
The Enterprise crew meet their own descendants from an alternate timeline in the past.
74	22	"The Council"	February 12, 2154	David Livingston	Manny Coto	May 12, 2004	40358-074	3.41
Captain Archer speaks at the Xindi Council, sparking a civil war for control of the superweapon.
75	23	"Countdown"	February 13, 2154	Robert Duncan McNeill	André Bormanis & Chris Black	May 19, 2004	40358-075	3.46
Captain Archer seeks the support of the Aquatics in order to tip the war in their favor.
76	24	"Zero Hour"	February 14, 2154	Allan Kroeker	Rick Berman & Brannon Braga	May 26, 2004	40358-076	3.91
The final showdown with the Reptilians and their Guardian allies occurs.

== Production ==
Season 3 was the first to use a single story arc for an entire season and is only one of two seasons (of every Star Trek series) not to feature a Klingon character, the other being the first season of Star Trek: Strange New Worlds. The season was cut from 26 to 24 episodes by Paramount, following some disappointing early ratings. In an attempt at boosting ratings, the series title was changed to Star Trek: Enterprise after "Extinction" (earlier episodes released later on DVD were updated to reflect this change) and the theme music was made more upbeat.

The series had been filmed in High Definition from the pilot episode, but the sixth episode, "Exile", was the first episode to be broadcast in HD.

== Broadcast ==
Season	Timeslot	Season premiere	Season finale	TV season	Rank	Viewers (in millions)
3rd		September 10, 2003	May 26, 2004	2003–2004	178	3.26

== Media information ==
Season three was also included in a complete set containing all four seasons of the series.

Star Trek: Enterprise – Season 3
Set details		Special features	
24 episodes; 6-disc set; 1:85:1 aspect ratio; Subtitles: Danish, Dutch, English, English for the hearing impaired, French, German, Italian, Norwegian, Spanish, Swedish; Audio: English (Dolby Digital 5.1 and 2.0 Surround), French, German, Italian and Spanish (Dolby Digital 2.0 Surround)		DVD and Blu-ray: The Xindi Saga Begins; Enterprise Moments: Season 3; Enterprise Profile: Connor Trinneer; A Day in the Life of a Director: Roxanne Dawson; Outtakes; Behind the Camera: Marvin Rush (exclusive to North America BestBuy boxset); Audio Commentary: "North Star" and "Similitude"; Text Commentary: "The Xindi", "Impulse" and "Countdown"; Deleted scenes: "Similitude ", "Chosen Realm" and "E2".; Blu-Ray: In a Time of War: Call to Arms, Front Lines, Final Conflict; Temporal Cold War: Declassified	
Release dates
DVD		Blu-ray	
Region 1	Region 2	United States (Region free)	United Kingdom (Region free)
September 27, 2005	September 5, 2005	January 7, 2014	January 27, 2014

== Reception ==
Enterprise's long-term ratings decline, which it had been suffering through its entire run, continued in Season 3, which featured both the show's last episode to be seen by more than four million people ("Stratagem"), and the first to be seen by fewer than three million ("Damage").

In 2019, CBR rated Season 3 of Star Trek: Enterprise as the seventh best season of all Star Trek seasons up to that time.

In 2022, Dominic Keating said he liked the original theme music, but disliked the revised version used in Season 3.

== See also ==
- Xindi
