= Harbinger (Star Trek: Enterprise) =

- Star Trek: Enterprise episode
- Episode no.: Season 3 Episode 15
- Directed by: David Livingston
- Story by: Rick Berman; Brannon Braga
- Teleplay by: Manny Coto
- Production code: 315
- Original air date: February 11, 2004

Guest appearances
- Noa Tishby - Corporal Amanda Cole; Thomas Kopache - The Alien; Steven Culp - Major Hayes

Episode chronology
← Previous "Stratagem"	Next → "Doctor's Orders"
- Star Trek: Enterprise season 3

"Harbinger" is the sixty-seventh episode of Star Trek: Enterprise, the fifteenth episode from the third season. The episode aired on UPN on February 11, 2004. "Harbinger" works together three plot lines in a single episode: the T'Pol-Tucker relationship, the Hayes (the MACO commander) and Reed tension and uncovering the nature of a mysterious alien discovered in an anomaly and its possible links to the expanse sphere builders. Guest star Thomas Kopache plays the alien guest and Noa Tishby plays Amanda Cole, the third in the T'Pol-Tucker love triangle.

== Plot ==
It is December 2153, and Enterprise continues along its course towards Azati Prime to find the Xindi weapon. (Note: "Stratagem") Commander Tucker begins spending time with a female MACO; Corporal Amanda Cole, and Sub-Commander T'Pol begins to exhibit signs of suppressed jealousy. Meanwhile, the long-simmering tension between Lieutenant Reed and Major Hayes finally comes to a head when Hayes approaches Archer over their security roles aboard Enterprise. Hayes suggests training together to share ideas, but Reed sees this as a move to undermine his authority.

Enterprise diverts to investigate a convergent region of spatial anomalies (created in the center of five spheres), where the crew discover a pod containing an alien. The pod is retrieved, and the alien is taken to Sickbay, but Doctor Phlox can do little to keep him alive. Archer wishes to interrogate him, and does so against Phlox's wishes. Meanwhile, Hayes sets up a weapons training session, and comments continually at Reed's performance. They later get into a fistfight, much to Archer's chagrin.

T'Pol and Tucker finally continue their Vulcan 'neuropressure' sessions, and T'Pol reveals her conversation with Sim-Trip to him, and the two become intimate. She later is very clinical in thanking Tucker for his assistance in her one-time "exploration of human sexuality". Back in Sickbay, the alien revives and physically begins to phase. He attacks Phlox, and then heads through walls towards the warp core, attempting to destabilize the magnetic seals. Reed and Hayes, now working together, stop the alien and he is returned to Sickbay. When Archer asks for answers, the alien says that when the Xindi destroy Earth his people (Note: His people are later revealed to be the Sphere Builders) will prevail, and phases again, disappearing completely.

== Production ==
The story was by Rick Berman and Brannon Braga, and the script written by Manny Coto. David Livingston directed, and started pre-production immediately after shooting "Proving Ground." Production ran from November 19 to December 1, with a break for the Thanksgiving holiday weekend.

Guest star Thomas Kopache who plays the unknown alien, made several previous appearances in Star Trek, including the Enterprise premiere of "Broken Bow" as the Vulcan Tos. He also portrayed the father of Kira Nerys in two episodes of Deep Space Nine.

One prop featured in this show is a latex alien body with mottled skin inside of a clear acrylic tube. The latex alien has a multitude of attached probes and clear wires, possibly fiber optics. This was meant to show the alien inside what was thought to be a stasis chamber. The item was auctioned by Christie's in October 2006 for a hammer price of 3,840 USD, against an estimate of 2,000-3,000 USD. The prop is known as "Pin Cushion Man" and overall has a size of 90 inches by 36 inches by 54 inches (2.3 m × 0.91 m × 1.4 m).

== Reception ==
Harbinger was first aired in the United States on UPN on February 11, 2004. According to Nielsen Media Research, it received a 2.6/4 rating share among adults. It had an average of 3.9 million viewers.

A review compared "Harbinger" to the Deep Space Nine episode "Call To Arms" and noted its connection to the season long Xindi story arc in season 3. Herc of Ain't It Cool News gave the episode three out of five, but concluded: "For all its entertainment value, this episode doesn't have an idea in its head; it's one of the emptiest installments of Star Trek ever produced." Screen Rant ranked "Harbinger" as the sixth best romance in Star Trek, noting this episode as the beginning of T'Pol and Trip's relationship.

== Home media release ==
"Harbinger" was released as part of the season three DVD box set, released in the United States on September 27, 2005. The Blu-ray release of Enterprise was announced in early 2013, and the season three box set was released on January 7, 2014. The Blu-Ray has a surround sound 5.1 DTS-HD Master Audio track for English, as well as German, French, and Japanese audio tracks in Dolby audio.
