= E-squared =

E-squared may refer to:

- "E²", an episode of Star Trek: Enterprise
- E-Squared Records, a music label founded by Steve Earle and Jack Emerson
