= Azati Prime =

- Star Trek: Enterprise episode
- Episode no.: Season 3 Episode 18
- Directed by: Allan Kroeker
- Story by: Rick Berman; Brannon Braga; Manny Coto
- Teleplay by: Manny Coto
- Production code: 318
- Original air date: March 3, 2004

Guest appearances
- Matt Winston as Temporal Agent Daniels; Randy Oglesby as Degra; Scott MacDonald as Commander Dolim; Tucker Smallwood as Xindi-Primate Councilor; Rick Worthy as Jannar; Christopher Goodman - Thalen

Episode chronology
← Previous "Hatchery"	Next → "Damage"
- Star Trek: Enterprise season 3

"Azati Prime" is the eighteenth episode of the third season of the American science fiction television series Star Trek: Enterprise, the 70th overall. The episode aired on UPN on March 3, 2004. The episode was written by Manny Coto from a story developed by Coto, Rick Berman and Brannon Braga. It was directed by Allan Kroeker, his second of the season. The episode featured several guest actors, including those playing members of the Xindi Council, as well as Matt Winston who reprised his role of Temporal Agent Daniels for the second time this season.

Set in the 22nd century, the series follows the adventures of the first Starfleet starship Enterprise, registration NX-01. Season three of Enterprise features an ongoing story following an attack on Earth by previously unknown aliens called the Xindi. In this episode, the crew track a Xindi superweapon down to a planet and Captain Jonathan Archer (Scott Bakula) seeks to destroy the weapon in a suicide attack. He is captured, and the Enterprise is seriously damaged after an attack by four Xindi vessels.

The USS Enterprise-J appeared in this episode, based on designs by Doug Drexler. The ship was from 400 years in the future from the timeframe that the series is set in, and the bridge set was created mostly using green screen. John Eaves also created several designs of aquatic Xindi vessels for this episode. "Azati Prime" received Nielsen ratings of 2.6/4 percent. Critical reaction was mostly positive, with praise directed at the pacing of the episode and the plotting of the overall arc.

== Plot ==
Enterprise approaches Azati Prime where the Xindi are constructing their super weapon. Captain Archer sends Commander Tucker and Ensign Mayweather on board the Xindi shuttle they had captured, to investigate the planet. Working their way past security, they approach the weapon, which is being built underwater. Archer orders Enterprise to destroy a Xindi detection facility on the planet's moon to prevent it from signalling the ship's presence. The shuttle returns with scans of the weapon and Archer decides to pilot a suicide mission to destroy it. The crew try to talk him out of it but he is resolute.

Archer then finds himself 400 years in the future on board the USS Enterprise-J, alongside Temporal Agent Daniels. They are at the battle where the Sphere Builders (Note: the alien species first seen in episode "Harbinger") are defeated by the Federation, preventing an invasion. The builders have the technology to view alternate timelines, and have been manipulating the Xindi to prevent the Federation from forming. Daniels gives Archer an initiation medal from a Xindi who had joined Starfleet as temporal evidence. Back on his Enterprise, Archer rejects the notion of a Human–Xindi détente and leaves on the shuttle. He arrives at the super weapon construction site but finds the weapon is gone, and is rapidly captured by the Xindi Commander Dolim.

The Reptilians begin to interrogate Archer, who then asks to speak to Degra, the Primate scientist from episode Stratagem. Using Daniels' medal, Archer tries to convince Degra that the Reptilians cannot be trusted but Dolim arrives with armed colleagues and takes the Primates away. Sub-Commander T'Pol, in command of Enterprise, displays signs of an emotional breakdown. She also decides to go on a mission, to negotiate a peace and reacts angrily when Tucker tries to stop her. An attack from four Xindi ships follows, and the episode concludes with a cliffhanger, as Enterprise is left severely damaged.

== Production ==
"Azati Prime" was the first episode of Enterprise to be filmed in 2004, starting on January 5. Filming took eight days, concluding on January 14. The eighth day overlapped with the production of the following episode, "Damage". The story was developed by Manny Coto alongside Rick Berman and Brannon Braga. Coto developed it into a script, his third of the series. The director of the episode was Allan Kroeker, who also directed "The Xindi" earlier in the season as well as the final episodes of both Star Trek: Deep Space Nine and Star Trek: Voyager. The episode featured a number of guest stars, including Smallwood, Oglesby, MacDonald and Worthy, who appeared in their recurring roles on the Xindi council. Winston appeared as Daniels for the second time during season three, having made his debut in season one's "Cold Front".

The Xindi shuttle set had been constructed for "Hatchery", while a new set was constructed for the bridge of the Enterprise-J, which consisted mostly of a green screen. The future Enterprise was designed by Doug Drexler, who drew the first design only two days prior to the production meeting for the episode. The computer generated model was created in a few hours, and Drexler later said that they would have finished it differently. He imagined that the vessel was so large that there would be universities and entire parks on board, with the turbolifts replaced by short range transporters. More than one design was created, with the final version created with elements from different designs. One of the elements incorporated into the version seen on screen was a reduction in the size of the warp nacelle supports as Drexler said that he did not like that they had increased in size. John Eaves also created a number of designs for aquatic Xindi vessels for use in the episode, as well as a rejected design for the superweapon.

== Reception ==
"Azati Prime" was first aired in the United States on UPN on March 3, 2004. It received a 2.6/4 percent share among adults. This means that it was seen by 2.6 percent of all households, and four percent of all of those watching television at the time of the broadcast. Enterprise was the sixth most watched program in the time slot, behind Smallville on The WB. It was estimated that "Azati Prime" was watched by 4.02 million viewers, which was less than recent episodes had received.

Michelle Erica Green of TrekNation compared elements of the episode to the Star Wars franchise, such as the Xindi super-weapon standing in for the Death Star. She found the pacing made the episode "engrossing" and thought that the action sequences would qualify it for technical Emmy Awards. She said that the one flaw in the episode was the characterization of Archer and T'Pol, as she felt that some of their actions were implausible. Jamahl Epsicokhan on his website Jammer's Reviews, gave "Azati Prime" a rating of three and a half out of four. He thought it was compelling and was impressed with how elements of earlier episodes were brought together, also saying that it was "possibly the most entertaining episode of Enterprise yet this season". Aint It Cool News gave the episode a rating of 3.5 out of five, and generally praised the episode, but complained that Archer found himself in a prison cell yet again. Film and television critic Jordan Hoffman gave the episode four out of five, and said that the Xindi story-line was reaching a peak.

James Gray writing for The Digital Fix said "Azati Prime" was probably the best episode in the series yet, and had the best space battle scene of all Star Trek television and movies up to that time. Io9 ranked the spacecraft design shown in this episode, the Enterprise-J, as the eleventh best version of the starship Enterprise in the Star Trek franchise.

== Home media release ==
The only home media release of "Azati Prime" has been as part of the season three DVD box set, released in the United States on September 27, 2005. The Blu-ray release of Enterprise was announced in early 2013 and season three is expected to be released in January 2014.
