= Proving Ground (Star Trek: Enterprise) =

- Star Trek: Enterprise episode
- The Andorians and Commander Shran arrive and provide assistance to Enterprise
- Episode no.: Season 3 Episode 13
- Directed by: David Livingston
- Written by: Chris Black
- Production code: 313
- Original air date: January 21, 2004

Guest appearances
- Molly Brink - Lieutenant Talas; Randy Oglesby - Degra; Scott MacDonald - Commander Dolim; Tucker Smallwood - Xindi-Primate Councilor; Rick Worthy - Jannar; Granville Van Dusen - Andorian General; Jeffrey Combs - Commander Shran; Josh Drennen - Degra's Assistant

Episode chronology
← Previous "Chosen Realm"	Next → "Stratagem"
- Star Trek: Enterprise season 3

"Proving Ground" is the thirteenth episode from the third season of the science fiction television series Star Trek: Enterprise. It is the sixty-fifth episode of the series, first airing on UPN on January 21, 2004.

This installment continues the story arc of the Starfleet spaceship Enterprise dealing with an attack on Earth by the Xindi in the 22nd century. After opening with a montage of scenes from previous shows, Captain Archer and a recurring Andorian character, Commander Shran, take on the Xindi in an uncertain alliance.

== Plot ==
Enterprise, despite losing most of its map data, continues to traverse a series of spatial anomalies in the Delphic Expanse. When heavily damaged by a particularly dangerous vortex, Enterprise is suddenly pulled clear by an Andorian ship. The ship's captain, Shran, claims he is only interested in helping Enterprise in its mission to subvert the Xindi's planet-killing weapon, in the interest of forming a closer alliance with humanity.

Suspicious of the Andorian's true motives, Captain Archer nonetheless agrees to allow them to work with his crew to repair the ship and to scan the test-site of the Xindi prototype weapon.

Shran permits Archer to command his crew in capturing the weapon. With Enterprise distracting the Xindi, the Andorian vessel grabs the weapon and stores it aboard. The Andorians actually want the weapon to give them an advantage in their conflict with the Vulcans. Archer is ejected in an escape-pod.

Back aboard Enterprise, Archer contacts Shran and threatens to detonate the weapon unless the Andorians surrender it. Shran believes this ultimatum to be a bluff, but when Archer activates the detonation sequence, he reluctantly ejects it. The weapon explodes, damaging the Andorian ship but leaving Enterprise unscathed.

They receive a secret transmission from the Andorians, containing detailed scans of the prototype. Archer is pleased and orders it transmitted to Starfleet, and invites Trip and T'Pol to his quarters to try some Andorian Ale.

== Production ==
Combs had previously made guest appearances in both Star Trek: Deep Space Nine and Star Trek: Voyager. Producer Manny Coto said he hoped to make Combs a regular on the show, had the series been renewed for a fifth season.

Shran's antennae are prosthetics that are moved by remote control. Combs and the puppeteer discussed the scenes in advance so they could work in tandem, "we have created, slowly, this little bit of language," which can reflect the character's mood, speech, and actions.

The episode is directed by veteran Star Trek franchise television director David Livingston, who directed over 60 episodes of Star Trek in this period.

== Reception ==
"Proving Ground" first aired in the United States on UPN on January 21, 2004. According to Nielsen Media Research, it received a 2.2/3 rating share among adults. It had an average of 3.4 million viewers. American Idol dominated the evening, pushing down the ratings for other networks.

James Gray writing for The Digital Fix was positive about the episode, and was happy with the presentation of the Andorian character Shran. Lisa Granshaw at Den of Geek noted the Andorian episodes as an important vehicle for Shran, one of the significant characters of the series. Combs' performance was also praised.

Critic Darren Mooney concludes that "Proving Ground" is "not a bad episode. In fact, it is quite a good one." In a wide-ranging review, touching on multiple episodes, he notes that "Proving Ground" "contributes more to the arc than anything like 'Carpenter Street' or 'Chosen Realm', featuring the testing of the Xindi weapon. It also features the Andorians, suggesting that Star Trek: Enterprise has not completely divorced itself from its original place in the Star Trek canon." The Digital Fix said this episode gave "some real momentum" to the third season, and had plenty of plot twists.

== Home media release ==
"Proving Ground" was released as part of the season three DVD box set, released in the United States on September 27, 2005. The Blu-ray release of Enterprise was announced in early 2013, and the season three box set was released on January 7, 2014. The Blu-Ray has a surround sound 5.1 DTS-HD Master Audio track for English, as well as German, French, and Japanese audio tracks in Dolby audio.

== See also ==
- "Journey to Babel" (Andorians introduced to Star Trek, airdate November 17, 1967)
- "The Andorian Incident" (first ENT episode with Andorians in season 1, introduces Shran)
- ENT season 4 trilogy story with Andorians:
  - "Babel One" (S4E12, part one, airdate- January 28, 2005)
  - "United" (S4E13, part two, airdate- February 4, 2005)
  - "The Aenar" (S4E14, part three, airdate- February 11, 2005)
