= Hatchery (Star Trek: Enterprise) =

- Star Trek: Enterprise episode
- Episode no.: Season 3 Episode 17
- Directed by: Michael Grossman
- Story by: André Bormanis; Michael Sussman
- Teleplay by: André Bormanis
- Production code: 317
- Original air date: February 25, 2004

Guest appearances
- Steven Culp - Major Hayes; Daniel Dae Kim - Corporal Chang; Sean McGowan - Corporal Hawkins; Paul Eliopoulos - Crewman #1

Episode chronology
← Previous "Doctor's Orders"	Next → "Azati Prime"
- Star Trek: Enterprise season 3

"Hatchery" is the seventeenth episode of the third season of the American science fiction television series Star Trek: Enterprise, the 69th overall. It was written by André Bormanis and Michael Sussman, and was directed by Michael Grossman; his first episode of Star Trek. The episode aired on UPN on February 25, 2004.

Set in the 22nd century, the series follows the adventures of the first Starfleet starship Enterprise, registration NX-01. Season three of Enterprise features an ongoing story following an attack on Earth by previously unknown aliens called the Xindi. In this episode, Captain Jonathan Archer (Scott Bakula) discovers an Insectoid egg hatchery on a downed Xindi ship and becomes obsessed with protecting the eggs. In response to his increasingly erratic behavior, Commander Charles "Trip" Tucker III (Connor Trinneer) leads a mutiny to relieve Archer of his command.

== Plot ==
The Enterprise investigates a lifeless Insectoid vessel crashed on a barren planet, hoping to find helpful information on its computer database. Archer leads an away team to explore the wreckage and discovers an Insectoid hatchery with several dozen surviving eggs, but a failing bio-support system. He is sprayed in the face by one of the eggs. Doctor Phlox concludes it was a defense mechanism and treats him with an analgesic. Dead Insectoids and one of their shuttles are then taken aboard for analysis, and computer logs reveal the survivors cut off their own life support in order to save the ship's hatchery.

Despite objections, Archer keeps Enterprise at the planet and orders Commander Tucker to repair the hatchery's bio-support. Incompatibilities with Starfleet portable power generators cause an overload, prematurely hatching one of the eggs, but Phlox cannot save it. Increasingly obsessive, Archer soon orders the transfer of one-third of Enterprise's antimatter supply to the Xindi ship so that full power can be restored. With the success of the mission in mind, Sub-Commander T'Pol refuses to carry out his order, so he relieves her of duty and confines her to quarters. Soon after, Lieutenant Reed, in control of the bridge, destroys an escaping Xindi ship. Archer relieves him as well, saying that the alien crew could have helped to save the eggs.

Archer promotes Major Hayes, non-Starfleet leader of the MACOs (Military Assault Command Operations), to First Officer. Hayes questions nothing about Archer's behavior, and has his MACOs man a number of critical positions on the ship. Archer orders Ensign Sato to prepare an Insectoid-language distress signal. With time running out, Tucker and Phlox conclude that a mutiny is in order, and they free T'Pol and Reed to assist. After a tense standoff and shootout with the MACOs, the Enterprise crew capture the bridge. Meanwhile, Tucker beams down to the hatchery and stuns Archer. Back on Enterprise, a thorough medical scan by Phlox reveals that the egg had sprayed Archer with a "nurturing hormone", making him focus on preserving them. In the end, Archer is fully treated, Hayes confirms that he did not have a medical reason for thoughtlessly following questionable orders, and the ship resumes at full warp-speed towards Azati Prime.

== Production ==
The script for "Hatchery" was written by André Bormanis and Michael Sussman, and directed by Michael Grossman. This was the first episode in the Star Trek universe to be directed by Grossman, who had previously directed episodes of the science fiction and fantasy television shows Firefly, Buffy the Vampire Slayer and Angel. "Hatchery" saw the return of several of the recurring cast members portraying MACO marines; Steven Culp as Major Hayes, Daniel Dae Kim as Corporal Chang and Sean McGowen as Corporal Hawkins. The other MACOs seen were portrayed by stunt workers.

"Hatchery" required several new sets to be built under the supervision of production designer Herman Zimmerman, to represent the crashed Xindi-Insectoid vessel and the hatchery chamber. The special effects seen in the episode, such as the egg sacs and the dead Insectoids, were created by the makeup team under the leadership of Michael Westmore. The work of these two teams, combined with the smoke and lighting effects, create the hatchery set seen throughout the episode. Further effects were added in post-production, which included the addition of newborn Insectoids. Filming was completed on December 19, 2003, the final episode to be filmed that year. The cast and crew took a two-week break following "Hatchery" over Christmas, returning on January 5, 2004.

== Reception ==
"Hatchery" was first aired in the United States on UPN on February 25, 2004. According to Nielsen Media Research, it received a 2.4/4 percent share among adults. This means that it was seen by 2.4 percent of all households, and 4 percent of all of those watching television at the time of the broadcast. Both the previous and following episodes, "Doctor's Orders" and "Azati Prime", received higher ratings, each of 2.6/4 percent. "Hatchery" was not the least viewed installment of the series, which came two episodes later when "Damage" received a rating of 2.0/3 percent.

Michelle Erica Green of TrekNation enjoyed the episode and said it had thrilling moments but was disappointed that it did nothing to further the Xindi plot arc. "It's good, but it's not quite striving for greatness."

Baz Greenland of The Digital Fix said this was a "decent" episode in season 3, but thought it delayed resolving the Xindi story arc.

== Home media release ==
The first home media release of "Hatchery" was as part of the season three DVD box set, released in the United States on September 27, 2005. The Blu-ray release of the third season of Enterprise took place on January 7, 2014.
