= Triannon =

Triannon may refer to

- Grand Trianon, in France
- Petit Trianon, in France
- The Triannon, an alien race in the Star Trek: Enterprise episode "Chosen Realm"
