= Doctor's Orders (Star Trek: Enterprise) =

- Star Trek: Enterprise episode
- Episode no.: Season 3 Episode 16
- Directed by: Roxann Dawson
- Written by: Chris Black
- Production code: 316
- Original air date: February 18, 2004

Episode chronology
| ← Previous "Harbinger" | Next → "Hatchery" |
- Star Trek: Enterprise season 3

"Doctor's Orders" is the sixteenth episode from the third season of the science fiction television series Star Trek: Enterprise. It is the sixty-eighth episode of the series, first airing on UPN on February 18, 2004.

In the 22nd century aboard spaceship NX-01 Enterprise, two crew members, Doctor Phlox and Commander T'Pol, guide the ship through an area of dangerous space while the rest of the crew are comatose. The episode is directed by Roxann Dawson with a story by Chris Black, and additional music by Kevin Kiner and Dennis McCarthy.

== Plot ==
While traveling through the Delphic Expanse, Enterprise encounters a trans-dimensional disturbance that lies directly along its time-sensitive course to Azati Prime and the Xindi weapon ("Stratagem"). The crew also learns that the disturbance causes permanent neurological damage to the human neocortex. To avoid a two-week detour while avoiding the danger to the crew, Doctor Phlox disables the neocortex of all human crewmembers, so they can survive the four day journey through the disturbance on impulse power. Trip Tucker fears the transdimensional space will adversely affect the warp field and recommends against using the warp drive in the disturbance.

While the crew is sedated, Phlox attends to his extended duties aboard the ship, including caring for Captain Archer's dog, Porthos, since Phlox is immune to the effects of the disturbance. As Phlox does so, he takes the opportunity to compose a letter to Dr. Lucas, a friend of his whom he met on an exchange tour of Denobula. Unfortunately, Phlox himself begins to become nervous and is easily spooked by irregular ship noises. In Engineering, falsely perceiving movement, he becomes increasingly tense and nervous. While investigating a noise, he encounters Sub-Commander T'Pol, who is also carrying out duties while the human crew are sedated and, as a Vulcan, has been enjoying the quiet contemplation this situation allows her. She commits to spending some time with Phlox for a meal.

Phlox's paranoia escalates into delusion. At one point, he believes that two Insectoids have somehow boarded the ship. T'Pol insists there is nothing on the sensors, but humors him by helping with a deck-to-deck search, which reveals nothing save that Phlox is becoming delusional. During the search Phlox almost shoots Porthos, who he forgot to put in his cabin. T'Pol reminds him that it is healthy for Denobulans to use hallucinations to relieve stress. Phlox disagrees until he hears and then sees a 'zombie' Ensign Sato; he contacts T'Pol and encounters an awake Captain Archer hallucination. He finally scans himself after having nearly a dozen hallucinations, and confirms the disturbance is impacting his thinking. He plans to sedate himself and let T'Pol run the ship; but she states that she is also becoming disturbed, despite not having hallucinations. He refuses to sedate T'Pol and remains in command.

After four days, they discover that the anomaly they have transited is expanding and Enterprise is now ten weeks from its edge, rather than having emerged from it half an hour before as they should have. Both T'Pol and Phlox are now easily agitated and distracted, but they conclude that engaging the warp drive is their only chance to escape. T'Pol's mind is unable to focus on helping as Phlox battles to master the warp drive. He succeeds in getting the ship free of the altered space, running the warp engines at Warp 2 with her help.

That done, he wakes Archer and then escorts T'Pol to her room, only to find the real T'Pol sleeping there, having been sedated at the same time as the human crew. His T'Pol hallucination disappears, but the ship and crew are now safe.

Phlox sends his unedited letter along to his friend, Dr. Lucas, assuring him that he will enjoy the story of his hallucinations.

== Production ==
"Doctor's Orders" was written by co-executive producer Chris Black. The episode was directed by Roxann Dawson, making it the eighth time she directed an episode of Enterprise. Billingsley and Blalock were the only two actors on set for all seven days of filming.

== Reception ==
Doctor's Orders was first aired in the United States on UPN on February 18, 2004. According to Nielsen Media Research, it received a 2.6/4 rating share among adults. It had an average of 3.7 million viewers.

Michelle Erica Green of TrekNation called it an "interesting character study" and said "as bottle shows go, it's a beautifully done, satisfying episode, and a nice break from the Xindi action storyline while still moving the ship forward on its quest."

Star Trek Magazine rated "Doctor's Orders" one out of five, and named it the worst episode of the season, despite the heavy presence of Porthos, as he alone could not save this episode. James Whitbrook of Io9 described this episode as a worse version of the Star Trek: Voyager episode "One".

In contrast, Den of Geek in a review of important show characters, noted the doctor as "funny, quirky Phlox" pointing out that the character introduced the audience to the Denobulan species. They recommended the episodes "Dear Doctor", "Stigma", "The Breach" and "Doctor’s Orders" for the Phlox character.

== Home media release ==
"Doctor's Orders" was released as part of the season three DVD box set, released in the United States on September 27, 2005. The Blu-ray release of Enterprise was announced in early 2013, and the season three box set was released on January 7, 2014. The Blu-Ray has a surround sound 5.1 DTS-HD Master Audio track for English, as well as German, French, and Japanese audio tracks in Dolby audio.

== See also ==
- "One," an episode of Star Trek: Voyager which earlier used a similar plot.
- The Court Jester, the movie Doctor Phlox watches during movie night.
