= Stratagem (Star Trek: Enterprise) =

- Star Trek: Enterprise episode
- Episode no.: Season 3 Episode 14
- Directed by: Mike Vejar
- Story by: Terry Matalas
- Teleplay by: Michael Sussman
- Production code: 314
- Original air date: February 4, 2004

Guest appearances
- Randy Oglesby - Degra; Josh Drennen - Thalen; Douglas Bierman - Degra's Assistant

Episode chronology
← Previous "Proving Ground"	Next → "Harbinger"
- Star Trek: Enterprise season 3

"Stratagem" is the sixty-sixth episode of the science fiction television series Star Trek: Enterprise, the fourteenth episode of the third season. The episode aired on UPN on February 4, 2004. Set in the 22nd century, it follows the journey of the Starfleet spaceship Enterprise.

In this episode, Captain Archer tricks the Xindi scientist Degra into revealing information about the location of the super-weapon that the Xindi plan to use to destroy Earth.

== Plot ==
Three years in the future, Captain Archer and Degra (the scientist behind the Xindi weapon project) are aboard a shuttle escaping from an Insectoid prison camp. Degra cannot remember his time as Archer's cellmate and friend, and remains suspicious despite having a prison tattoo and long greying hair. Archer convinces him that this memory loss is due to the bloodworms in his system (used because they excrete a truth drug, but sometimes causes the victim to suffer temporary amnesia afterwards), and removes a live worm from Degra's arm.

They are, in fact, inside a simulator aboard Enterprise (and still in December 2153), and the entire setup is a ploy to learn where the weapon is being constructed. Degra and his crew had been captured near the test site of the weapon, the worm was inserted by Doctor Phlox, and the crew constructed the fake ship. The ruse is partially successful; Degra reveals information about his family and inputs coordinates into the navigation system. He later becomes suspicious after a malfunction in which one of the windows of the simulator briefly glitches due to ship-wide power fluctuations, and attacks Archer.

This leaves Archer with a dilemma; traveling to the red giant star, Azati Prime, would take them three weeks, time they do not have to waste on a wild goose chase. Instead, they again deceive Degra into thinking that they have used stolen Xindi warp technology to open subspace vortices, and trick him into thinking that they have already arrived at the coordinates. Degra shouts that they will never be able to breach the base's defenses, thus proving that the coordinates do relate to the weapon. In a final deception, Degra and his crew are mind-wiped and returned to their ship.

== Production ==
The story was by Terry Matalas, the script was written by Mike Sussman, and it was directed by Mike Vejar.

Filming began on Monday, November 10, and ran for the usual seven days until Tuesday the 18th.

== Reception ==
Stratagem first aired in the United States on UPN on February 4, 2004. According to Nielsen Media Research, it received a 2.6/4 rating share among adults. It had an average of 4.1 million viewers. American Idol was on top of the ratings overall, and a repeat of The Apprentice got higher ratings than Smallville and Enterprise.

Michelle Erica Green of TrekNation was positive about the episode and how it "develops an intriguing supporting character". She compared it to "Mission: Impossible in space" and called it a "marvelously entertaining episode". Brian at Bureau 42 sarcastically asked "Two weeks in a row for staying on track with the story? Someone tied up Berman and Braga, didn't they?" The Vulcan Database reviewed the episode and called it "a fantastic episode marred somewhat by a lackluster final act."

Critic Darren Mooney of them0vieblog.com was positive about how the showrunners stayed more disciplined with the over-arching plot-line of the Xindi conflict and avoided another episodic side-trip. The Digital Fix praised actor Randy Oglesby's depiction of the character Degra.

== Home media release ==
"Stratagem" was released as part of the season three DVD box set, released in the United States on September 27, 2005. The Blu-ray release of Enterprise was announced in early 2013, and the season three box set was released on January 7, 2014. The Blu-ray has a surround sound 5.1 DTS-HD Master Audio track for English, as well as German, French, and Japanese audio tracks in Dolby audio.
