= Mayweather =

Mayweather is a surname, and may refer to:

- Anthony Mayweather (born 1985), professional wrestler, also known as Crimson
- Earring George Mayweather (1927–1995), American blues harmonica player and singer
- Floyd Mayweather Sr. (born 1952), former boxer and current trainer
- Floyd Mayweather Jr. (born 1977), Olympic and professional boxer
- Jeff Mayweather (born 1964), former boxer and current boxing writer/trainer
- Roger Mayweather (1961–2020), boxer and boxing trainer of Floyd Mayweather Jr.

== See also ==
- Mayweather Promotions, a boxing promotional firm founded by Floyd Mayweather Jr. in 2007
- Travis Mayweather, fictional character portrayed by Anthony Montgomery in the television series Star Trek: Enterprise
- Eyan Mayweather, album by Nigerian rapper Olamide, 2015
