= David Livingston =

American television producer

- Occupations: Television director and producer

David Livingston is an American television producer and director. He is mostly known for his involvement in the writing and production of the various modern Star Trek franchises.

Livingston also has production credits on several episodes of Seven Days and Threshold as well as a 2002 television remake of Carrie.

== Career ==
=== Star Trek ===
Livingston began his work with Star Trek as a unit production manager on Next Generation in 1988 before moving up the ranks to become a supervising producer in 1992 for Next Generation and the subsequent Trek series. He served as a supervising producer on Star Trek: The Next Generation, Star Trek: Deep Space Nine and Star Trek: Voyager. He has directorial credits on two Next Generation episodes, 17 Deep Space Nine episodes, 28 Voyager episodes and 14 Enterprise episodes, for a total of 62 episodes. He also has writing credits on the Star Trek: Deep Space Nine first-season episode "The Nagus".

In 1994, Livingston was nominated, along with the rest of the series' production staff, for an Emmy for Outstanding Drama Series for Next Generation.

=== Contributions to the Star Trek universe ===
A lionfish in the aquarium of Jean-Luc Picard's ready room for all seven years of Star Trek: The Next Generation was named Livingston after him, by art director Herman F. Zimmerman. Also named after him were the Starship USS Livingston and Starfleet Vice Admiral David Livingston, who was listed on the dedication plaques of the USS Enterprise-D, USS Defiant, USS Pasteur, USS São Paulo and USS Voyager.

=== Other work ===
Livingston has production credits on several episodes the science fiction television series Seven Days and Threshold. He also has direction credits on episodes of Baywatch Nights, Seven Days, Viper, Sliders and Strong Medicine. In 2000, Livingston wrote, directed and produced Slice of Life, a short film starring Matthew Baer, Patricia Tallman and Star Trek: Voyager's Robert Picardo.

In 2004, Livingston opened a photography exhibition entitled "The Sign," featuring original photography of the Hollywood Sign. In 2005, he opened another exhibition entitled "Slice of Life" which featured some of Livingston's experimental photography. Livingston worked as photographer for WENN for nine months, before getting hired to work as a freelance photographer for Getty Images.
