= Phlox (Star Trek) =

Fictional character from the television series Star Trek: Enterprise

Dr. Phlox
- Star Trek character
- John Billingsley as Dr. Phlox
- First appearance: "Broken Bow" (2001)
- Last appearance: "These Are the Voyages..." (2005)
- Created by: Rick Berman; Brannon Braga
- Portrayed by: John Billingsley

In-universe information
- Species: Denobulan
- Affiliation: Starfleet
- Posting: Chief medical officer, Enterprise (NX-01)

Phlox /ˈflɒks/ is a fictional character, played by John Billingsley, in the television series Star Trek: Enterprise. Set in the 22nd century in the science fiction Star Trek universe, he is the physician aboard the first human Warp 5 capable starship, Enterprise (NX-01), commanded by Captain Jonathan Archer. Phlox first appears in the premiere episode, "Broken Bow" (2001), marking the franchise's introduction of the Denobulan race.

== Overview ==
Phlox, a Denobulan, was on Earth as part of the Interspecies Medical Exchange when he was called to serve aboard the Enterprise. As part of the Exchange, he regularly corresponds with Dr. Lucas, his human counterpart on his home planet of Denobula Triaxa.

Phlox has five children by his three wives: two daughters, both of whom also work in the medical field; and three sons, one of whom is an artist, while the youngest, Metus, is estranged from him (Phlox attempts to reconcile with him at the end of episode 21, season 2).

Phlox is portrayed as having an open mind to other species and cultures—even the Antarans, a race that once warred with the Denobulans. He is extremely frank about romantic and sexual matters, often to other crew members' embarrassment, and sometimes plays the role of matchmaker. He has an interest in natural remedies, and his sickbay contains an interplanetary menagerie, some of which are food for other animals that are sources for medical drugs.

Phlox is curious with a wry sense of humor. He has an affinity for Earth cuisine, particularly egg drop soup and other Chinese food. He is also interested in religion: he once prayed with a group of monks who visited Enterprise, spent a week with monks at a Tibetan monastery, attended Mass at St. Peter's Basilica in Rome and observed the Tal-Shanar ritual at the Vulcan compound in Sausalito.

Phlox's physical abilities were revealed gradually during the franchise. He appears to need little sleep, instead embarking on an annual "hibernation" that lasts for six days. He also has great control over his facial muscles, being able to open his mouth wider than humans, as demonstrated by the impossibly large grin he occasionally sports ("Broken Bow", "A Night in Sickbay" and "These Are the Voyages..."). When threatened, he has the ability to inflate his head like a blowfish to scare off attackers ("Home").

== Sexuality ==
According to Denobulan custom, Phlox has three wives, each of whom has two other husbands. Only one of his wives, Feezal, was seen on the show. His character being polyamorous has been noted in commentary. Billingsley himself has referred to the character as the first polyamorous Star Trek character, and has also referred to Phlox as the first gay character in the show.

== Reception ==
Media website The Digital Fix said that Billingsley delivered a "consistently charming performance", and that he convincingly portrayed Phlox as a doctor, including his ability to transition "from a reassuring bedside manner to one of sombre gravitas".

In 2015, Den of Geek, in a review of important show characters, noted him as "funny, quirky Phlox", and recommended the episodes "Dear Doctor", "Stigma", "The Breach" and "Doctor’s Orders" as his best appearances.

In 2016, SyFy ranked Phlox #1 of the six main-cast space doctors in the Star Trek franchise, citing his good bedside manner, relaxing demeanor, and success in curing patients, including those partially Borged.

In 2018, The Wrap ranked Phlox 27th out of 39 main-cast Star Trek franchise characters, prior to Star Trek: Discovery. Witney Seibold, writing for Slashfilm, referred to him as Trek's greatest character, describing his sense of humour and Billingsley's accomplished portrayal.

== Possible return of Phlox ==
With the popularity of the character amongst fans, it had initially been broached to Billingsley about returning to Live Star Trek. In 2021, he indicated he had been reluctant to return to the role, partially because of the time needed in makeup playing an alien character with prosthetics. However, as time has gone by, with the question raised consistently, about Enterprise returning has indicated he is willing to return to the character.

Both Phlox and Star Trek: Enterprise are popular with fans who want to see the show return. However while bringing the show back has challenges, there has been interest in bringing the character itself back into current shows, in particular Star Trek: Strange New Worlds. This is made possible because his race, the Denobulans, are very long lived, living to be 300 years or more, and he would still be alive in those timelines. Billingsley revealed the Strange New Worlds creative team in 2023 had enquired with him about the lifespan of his character, which he considered may be them trying to work Phlox into the cast of Strange New Worlds. He said he himself has also spoken to writers for Strange New Worlds and pitched ideas for the character's return.

== See also ==
- List of Star Trek: Enterprise characters
