= Mike Sussman (TV series writer/producer) =

American television writer and producer

- Born: Philadelphia, Pennsylvania, US
- Occupations: Television producer and writer

Mike Sussman is an American television writer and producer. He is best known as a creator and executive producer of the TNT crime drama Perception, as well as a writer and producer of the Star Trek franchise.

== Early life ==
Sussman was born in Philadelphia, Pennsylvania, later moving with his family to Sarasota, Florida. While attending Florida State University, he took a class in screenwriting, penning a spec script for Star Trek: The Next Generation that obtained him a Writers Guild of America internship with the writing staff of Star Trek: Voyager.

== Career ==
Prior to his first staff job on a scripted drama, Sussman worked in broadcast journalism, serving as a writer and producer for KCAL-TV's Emmy Award-winning Prime Nine News. He later shared the award for "Best Newscast" at the New York Festivals Television & Film Awards.

A longtime Star Trek fan, Sussman made his first professional sale to Voyager Executive Producer Michael Piller on the final day of his writing internship. That story became the basis for the acclaimed second-season episode "Meld," which cast Academy Award-nominee Brad Dourif in a recurring role as sociopathic crewman Lon Suder. Sussman ultimately sold several freelance stories to Voyager before partnering with Phyllis Strong, and the pair were hired as story editors by showrunner Kenneth Biller for the series' seventh and final season. Their partnership continued on the next spin-off, Star Trek: Enterprise, until the two branched out as solo writers; Sussman was subsequently promoted to producer on the series. All told, he is credited with writing or co-writing more than thirty episodes of the Star Trek franchise.

Sussman's work on Enterprise included many of the series most popular and acclaimed episodes. In its third season, he penned the time-jumping alternate reality tale "Twilight", which was rebroadcast on April 8, 2005, as the "#1 Fan Favorite Episode" of the series, chosen in a Viewer's Choice poll at UPN.com. In the show's fourth season, Sussman showed his affection for the original Star Trek series with arguably his most popular script, the two-part episode "In a Mirror, Darkly". Set in Star Trek's dark and oppressive Mirror Universe, the feature-length adventure recreated many of the iconic sets from The Original Series, and served as both a sequel and a prequel to episodes from Captain Kirk's era. New York Daily News TV critic David Bianculli called the two-parter "the best hours of Enterprise yet." In 2016, Star Trek fans at the 50th anniversary convention in Las Vegas chose "In a Mirror, Darkly" as one of the "10 Best Star Trek episodes" out of the more than seven hundred live-action episodes produced as of that date.

After his tenure on Star Trek, Sussman served as a writer and producer on the CBS science fiction drama Threshold, starring Carla Gugino and Peter Dinklage; and later on Sam Raimi's syndicated fantasy series Legend of the Seeker for Disney/ABC Studios.

Diversifying from his sci-fi background, Sussman went on to co-create and executive produce the one-hour crime procedural Perception with his former Trek colleague Kenneth Biller. That series, also from ABC Studios, starred Emmy Award-winner Eric McCormack as a crime-solving neurologist, and aired for three seasons on TNT. Following Perception, Sussman wrote and produced the SyFy Channel series 12 Monkeys; and The Last Ship from Executive Producer Michael Bay and TNT Originals.
