= Countdown (Star Trek: Enterprise) =

- Star Trek: Enterprise episode
- Episode no.: Season 3 Episode 23
- Directed by: Robert Duncan McNeill
- Written by: André Bormanis; Chris Black
- Production code: 323
- Original air date: May 19, 2004

Guest appearances
- Scott MacDonald – Commander Dolim; Rick Worthy – Jannar; Tucker Smallwood – Xindi-Primate Councilor; Josette DiCarlo – Sphere-Builder Woman; Bruce Thomas – Xindi-Reptilian Soldier; Andrew Borba – Xindi-Reptilian Lieutenant; Mary Mara – Sphere-Builder Presage; Ruth Williamson – Sphere-Builder Primary; Steven Culp – Major Hayes; Paul Dean – Reptilian Technician

Episode chronology
← Previous "The Council"	Next → "Zero Hour"
- Star Trek: Enterprise season 3

"Countdown" is the 23rd episode of the third season of the American science fiction television series Star Trek: Enterprise and is the 76th overall episode. It first aired on May 19, 2004, on UPN in the United States. Set in the 22nd century, the series follows the adventures of the first Starfleet starship, Enterprise, registration NX-01. Season three of Enterprise features an ongoing story-line that follows an attack on Earth by aliens called the Xindi, a group of aliens that did not appear in preceding series.

In this episode, Captain Jonathan Archer (Scott Bakula) convinces the Xindi-Aquatics to aid him in his fight against the Xindi-Reptilians and Insectoids alliance to prevent Earth's destruction by their super-weapon. The weapon departs for Earth, with Archer in pursuit on board a Xindi vessel. In the midst of a battle between the two Xindi factions, an away team is sent to rescue Ensign Hoshi Sato (Linda Park), previously captured by the Reptilians.

"Countdown" was the first collaboration between writers André Bormanis and Chris Black, and was directed by former Star Trek: Voyager actor Robert Duncan McNeill. It was shot over eight days, with additional sets built for the Xindi-Reptilian vessel and the interior of the super-weapon. Critics praised the change in the dynamic between Major Hayes (Steven Culp) and Malcolm Reed (Dominic Keating). "Countdown" was watched by 3.5 million viewers on its first broadcast. It won an Emmy award for visual effects.

== Plot ==
Needing a third species' codes to arm the weapon, Xindi-Reptilians inject their prisoner, Ensign Hoshi Sato, with neural-parasites. With the Xindi super-weapon about to be armed and time running out, Captain Jonathan Archer tries to persuade the Xindi-Aquatics to help him and his Xindi allies destroy it. Sato's kidnapping, and Archer's promises to shut down the 78 known spheres (initially a partial, desperate bluff), finally convinces the Aquatics into believing that the Sphere Builders, and not the humans, may indeed represent their true enemy.

A battle between Archer's Xindi fleet and the Reptilian-Insectoid fleet soon breaks out around the super-weapon. Locating Sato on board a Reptilian ship, a small squad of MACOs, led by Major Hayes and with the support of Lieutenant Malcolm Reed, transports on board the ship to extract her. With the space battle ongoing, the transporter system is damaged so that no more than two personnel can beam out at a time. Holding off the Reptilians on the ship, Hayes sends one of his men and Sato out first, and then the rest of the team, but just as Hayes, now alone, is beaming out, a Reptilian soldier fires through his chest. Back on board Enterprise, he tells Reed who his MACO successor should be, moments before he dies.

With the "threads of time" turning against them, the Sphere Builders decide to intervene by creating spatial distortions around the weapon. The distortions hinder Enterprise and the rest of Archer's Xindi fleet, and destroy a number of Aquatic ships, which buys the Reptilians enough time to activate the codes. Dolim (Scott MacDonald) has the super-weapon enter a vortex and head for Earth, escorted by two allied ships. Inside one of the vessels, having witnessed the interference of the Guardians using the Spheres, the Insectoid leader begins to doubt the motives of them and the Reptilians. Since the Reptilians already have the Insectoids' launch code, Dolim destroys the Insectoid's ship. Far behind via the vortex, and needing to close the distance with speed, Archer takes a Xindi recommendation to pursue Dolim using Degra's faster spaceship, taking a sickened Sato with his team to guide them through the super-weapon.

== Production ==
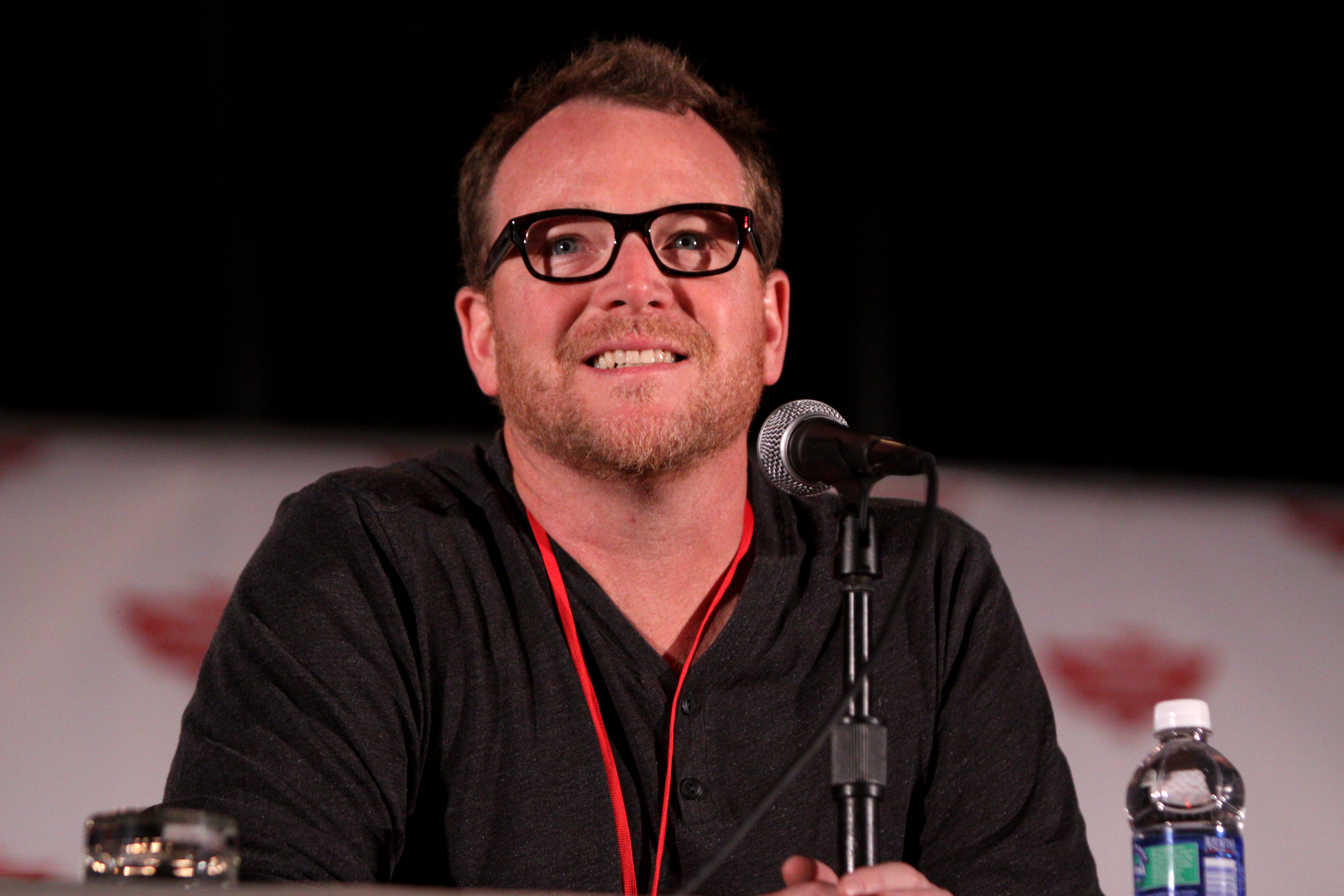
"Countdown" was the fourth episode of Enterprise to be directed by former Star Trek: Voyager actor Robert Duncan McNeill.

This was the first episode written as a combined effort by André Bormanis and Chris Black, although Bormanis had written episodes such as "Hatchery" and "Extinction", while Black wrote "Doctor's Orders" among others. "Countdown" also saw the return of Star Trek: Voyager actor Robert Duncan McNeill as director. The episode was his second during season three after previously working on "Twilight". "Countdown" had an eight-day shooting timetable versus the normal seven.

Additional sets were constructed to present the interior of the Xindi-Reptilian ship, and the inside of the super-weapon. Two full days of the shoot took place on the Reptilian sets, while a day was spent filming on the super-weapon set. The scenes set inside the ships of the Xindi-Aquatics and the Xindi-Insectoids were created in post-production rather than using physical sets. This was in addition to the standing sets, and the Xindi specific sets built initially for previous episodes, such as the interior of Degra's ship, and the "Avian Residence" which had both been built for use on-screen in "The Council". Scenes involving the Sphere Builders; played by Josette DiCarlo, Mary Mara and Ruth Williamson; were filmed in a combined shoot featuring the scenes from both "Countdown" and "The Council". Filming concluded on March 4, although B-unit shoots continued on March 8, with McNeil directing once more. This was in addition to further B-unit filming under the direction of Dan Curry for the episode "E²" and the start of the work on the season finale, "Zero Hour" under Allan Kroeker.

Several elements of the props and effects were re-used from previous episodes. The reactor core on the super-weapon was a combination of the props previously used as a Romulan mine in "Minefield" and rings from the Enterprise gymnasium which had appeared in the episode "Vanishing Point". The special effect used for the subspace vortexes created by the Sphere Builders had originally been created for the transwarp effect in the Voyager episode "Hope and Fear". The guest stars in "Countdown" were recurring from previous episodes, although it would be the final appearance for Steven Culp as Major Hayes. Culp had appeared in the series throughout the third season since "The Xindi". During the development of "The Shipment", Culp proposed the backstory for Hayes, which was accepted by the production team. The role was not his first in the Star Trek franchise, as he had been cast and filmed for an appearance as Commander Martin Madden for the film Star Trek: Nemesis. It would have seen him as the replacement for Commander William Riker at the end of the film, but it was cut from the final version.

== Reception ==
"Countdown" was first aired in the United States on UPN on May 19, 2004. According to Nielsen Media Research, it received a 2.3/4 percent share among adults. This means that it was seen by 2.3 percent of all households, and 4 percent of all of those watching television at the time of the broadcast. The episode was watched by 3.5 million viewers. The following episode, "Zero Hour", received a 2.7/4 percent rating with the viewer number increased by 400,000.

Michelle Erica Green, in her review for TrekNation, said that she saw the Hayes/Reed arc come full circle with the death of Hayes and the return of Reed to the position he had previously held prior to the MACO's arrival. She felt that otherwise, the episode consisted of action to the exclusion of character development but Green criticized the ease at which some of the Xindi side with Archer. She called it a "strong arc episode" and set-up the finale, but was concerned that the strong build-up could lead to it being an anticlimax. Jamahl Epsicokhan, on his website Jammer's Reviews, gave the episode a rating of three out of four. He felt that the structure of the plot was the same as the previous episode, but that it had no story and was "simply plot and action skillfully assembled — a series of events framed as goal-oriented nonstop momentum." He was pleased to see an improvement in the writing of the Reed/Hayes relationship and the MACOs, although he felt the collaborative working between the two parties should have occurred earlier in the season.

Digital Trends highlighted the best episodes from each Star Trek series, and picked "Countdown" and "Zero Hour" as the winners for Star Trek: Enterprise. The Digital Fix said that this episode, and the following episode "Zero Hour", were "an exciting end to an ambitious season."

=== Awards ===
The episode won an Emmy Award in the category "Outstanding Special Visual Effects for a Series". The episode "The Council" was also nominated.

== Home media release ==
The home media release of "Countdown" was as part of the season three DVD box set which was released in the United States on September 27, 2005. The Blu-ray release of Enterprise was announced in early 2013, and released on January 7, 2014. The Blu-Ray has a surround sound 5.1 DTS-HD Master Audio track for English, as well as German, French, and Japanese audio tracks in Dolby audio.
