= The Council (Star Trek: Enterprise) =

- Star Trek: Enterprise episode
- Episode no.: Season 3 Episode 22
- Directed by: David Livingston
- Written by: Manny Coto
- Production code: 322
- Original air date: May 12, 2004

Guest appearances
- Randy Oglesby – Degra; Tucker Smallwood – Xindi-Primate Councilor; Rick Worthy – Jannar; Scott MacDonald – Commander Dolim; Josette DiCarlo – Sphere-Builder Woman; Sean McGowan – Corporal Hawkins; Mary Mara – Sphere-Builder Presage; Ruth Williamson – Sphere-Builder Primary

Episode chronology
← Previous "E²"	Next → "Countdown"
- Star Trek: Enterprise season 3

"The Council" is the seventy-fourth episode of the American science fiction television series Star Trek: Enterprise, the twenty-second episode of season three. It first aired on May 12, 2004, on UPN in the United States. The episode was the fifth of the series written by Manny Coto, and it was directed by David Livingston, his fourth of the third season.

Set in the 22nd century, the series follows the adventures of the first Starfleet starship Enterprise, registration NX-01. Season three of Enterprise features an ongoing story following an attack on Earth by previously unknown aliens called the Xindi. In this episode, Captain Jonathan Archer (Scott Bakula) attempts to convince the Xindi Council not to use their super-weapon on Earth. Meanwhile, Sub-commander T'Pol (Jolene Blalock) leads an away team to a nearby sphere to attempt to retrieve a data core in order to get more information on the Sphere-Builders.

The episode featured several returning guest stars, including Randy Oglesby, Tucker Smallwood, Josette DiCarlo and Sean McGowan. Additional sets were required for the scenes at the Xindi Council, while the sets for Degra's ship had been created for an earlier episode. Although most scenes were filmed between February 12 and 23, the scenes featuring the Sphere-Builders were filmed in conjunction with the following episode on February 26. Two reviewers praised the episode, and it was nominated for the Primetime Emmy Award for Outstanding Special Visual Effects. There was a slight increase in ratings with the episode earning a 3.4/5% audience share, translating into approximately 3.35 million viewers.

== Plot ==
Enterprise is en route to the Xindi Council. Under escort by Degra's ship, Captain Archer is briefed on the five member species of the Council. Other friendly Xindi ships soon join the escort. As they approach the planet, the flagship of Reptilian Commander Dolim intervenes. After a tense standoff, Dolim backs down. On the planet, Archer and Ensign Sato enter the Council chamber and present their evidence to the gathered representatives; Dolim, angered at the move, walks out in protest. A Guardian appears to him later, promising Reptilian dominance if he continues their original plan.

Meanwhile, a shuttlepod containing Sub-Commander T'Pol, Lieutenant Reed, Ensign Mayweather and MACO Corporal Hawkins, investigate a nearby sphere in order to try to collect more data on the Sphere Builders (who are now becoming increasingly concerned with the human threat). The shuttle enters a concealed exhaust vent, and reaching the core, the team retrieve a memory module. The intrusion activates an automated defense system, and Hawkins is killed helping the others escape.

Doctor Phlox and Commander Tucker create a holographic version of the Sphere Builder (from "Harbinger") which Archer presents to the Council. Many admit its resemblance to the Guardian race, a people who the Xindi both revere and worship for helping them after the destruction of Xindus. The Guardians have claimed that they are protecting the Xindi from the spheres. The Council votes to delay the weapon's launch, with even Dolim agreeing. That night, Dolim confronts and murders Degra as revenge for the destruction of a Reptilian ship. At the next meeting, Dolim openly admits the death (and Reptilian primacy) and the Reptilian and Insectoid members leave. They soon launch the super-weapon, escorted by Dolim with his flagship. With both Enterprise and friendly Xindi vessels in pursuit, Dolim kidnaps Sato and disappears into a subspace vortex.

== Production ==
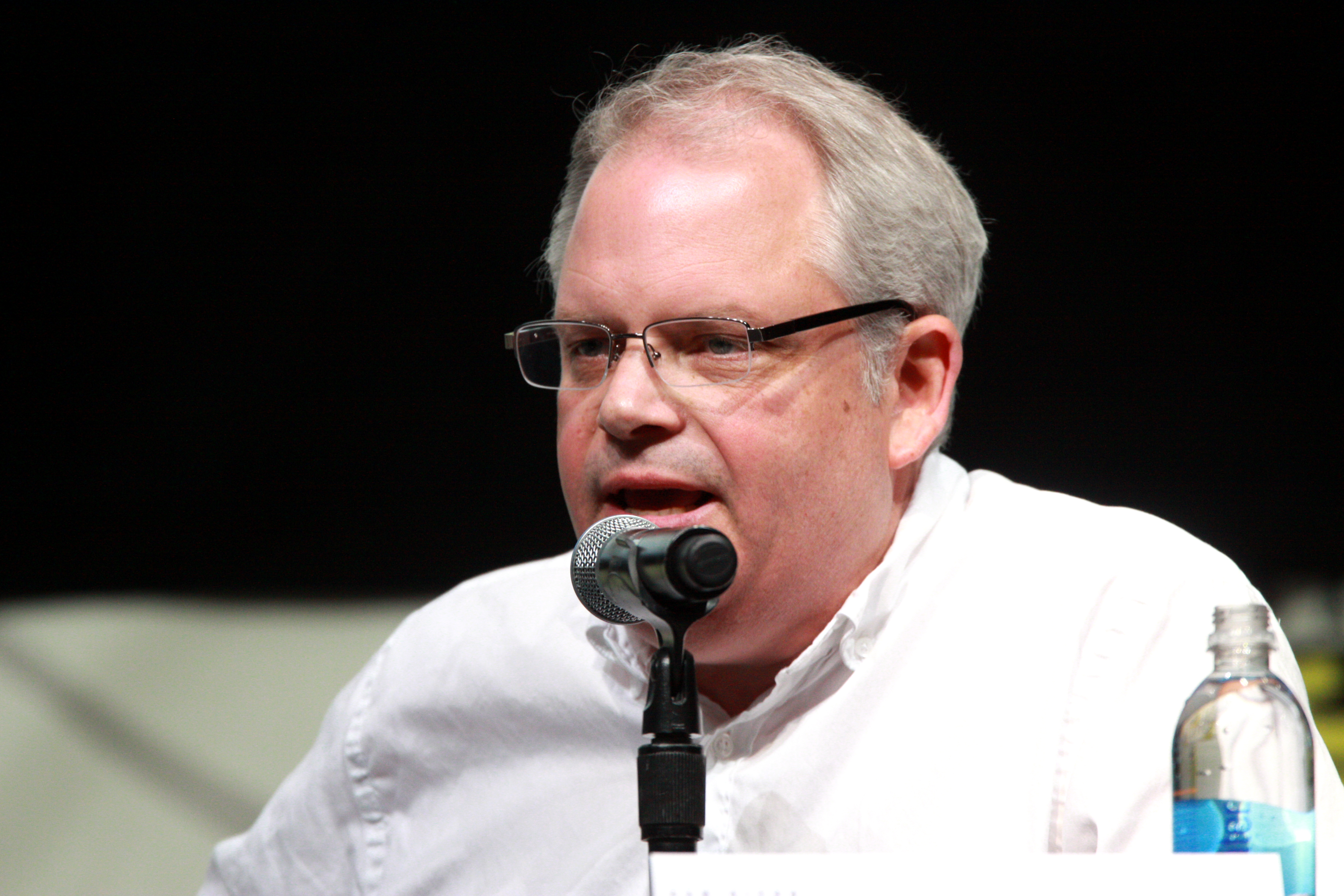
"The Council" was the fifth episode to be written by Manny Coto.

Filming on "The Council" began on February 12, 2004, and concluded on February 23, having taken seven days to film with shooting placed on hold for Presidents' Day. The exception to this was the scenes featuring Sphere-Builders which were shot in conjunction with the following episode, "Countdown", on February 26. Manny Coto wrote "The Council", his fifth episode for Enterprise. David Livingston directed the episode, which was his fourth of the season – tying Roxann Dawson for the most episodes during season three. It was the second time that Coto and Livingston had collaborated on an episode, having previously worked together on "Harbinger".

A number of temporary sets were built for the episode, including those for the Xindi Council, which were meant to be originally created in-universe by the extinct avian race of Xindi. The sets for Degra's ship continued to be used, and the Enterprise sets still featured damage following the actions in earlier episodes. "The Council" featured a larger than normal number of guest actors to represent various members of the Xindi Council. These included Tucker Smallwood as the Primate Council Member; He had previously appeared in the role earlier in the season in "The Xindi" and "Rajiin". Smallwood had also appeared elsewhere in the genre in Space: Above and Beyond as Commodore Ross. Sean McGowan made his fourth and final appearance of the series in "The Council", while Randy Oglesby also made his final appearance as Degra. Josette DiCarlo returned as a female Sphere-Builder, after first appearing in "Damage", while Mary Mara and Ruth Williamson both made their Enterprise debuts as other Sphere-Builders.

== Reception ==
"The Council" was first aired on May 12, 2004, on UPN. It received a 3.4/5% share, meaning that it was seen by 3.4 percent of all households, and 5 percent of all households watching television at the time of the broadcast. This translated to approximately 3.35 million viewers. It was a slight increase on the ratings received by the previous episode "E²", which was viewed by a 3.3% audience share.

Michelle Erica Green watched the episode for TrekNation, calling it a "taut, tense action episode" with predictable plot twists that still felt "wrenching" when revealed. Although she felt that the launch of the super-weapon was outweighed by the murder of Degra, she found the episode "quite engrossing" and thought "The Council" demonstrated that Enterprise was "coming into its own". Jamahl Epsicokhan, for his website Jammer's Reviews, said that the death of Degra was a shame as he was the "season's most pivotal and interesting character". He said that the shot of the super-weapon being launched was a "terrific and fearsome shot", and gave the episode a score of 3.5 out of 4.

The episode was nominated for the Primetime Emmy Award for Outstanding Special Visual Effects, but lost to the team that worked on the episode "Countdown".

The Digital Fix said this was an episode that "gets back to the heart of Star Trek."

== Home media release ==
The first home media release of "The Council" was as part of the season three DVD box set, released in the United States on September 27, 2005. The Blu-ray release of Enterprise was announced in early 2013, and released on January 7, 2014.
