= Exile (Star Trek: Enterprise) =

- Star Trek: Enterprise episode
- Episode no.: Season 3 Episode 6
- Directed by: Roxann Dawson
- Written by: Phyllis Strong
- Production code: 306
- Original air date: October 15, 2003

Guest appearances
- Maury Sterling - Tarquin; Philip Boyd - Com Officer

Episode chronology
← Previous "Impulse"	Next → "The Shipment"
- Star Trek: Enterprise season 3

"Exile" is the fifty-eighth episode of the American science fiction television series Star Trek: Enterprise, the sixth episode of season three. It first aired on October 15, 2003 on UPN in the United States, and was the first time the show was broadcast in High Definition. The episode was written by Phyllis Strong and directed by former Star Trek: Voyager actress Roxann Dawson.

Set in the 22nd century, the series follows the adventures of the first Starfleet starship Enterprise, registration NX-01. In this episode, Ensign Hoshi Sato (Linda Park) is contacted telepathically by an alien named Tarquin (Maury Sterling), who offers assistance with the Xindi. Whilst she visits Tarquin at his home, the rest of the crew investigate another mysterious sphere within the expanse.

The episode was seen as a take on Beauty and the Beast, with Sterling required to wear a full head prosthetic when Tarquin was in his non-human form. Several sets were created in a gothic style to represent Tarquin's home, while the anomalies created by the Delphic Expanse sphere were added in post production. The episode was the lowest rated so far of season three, having aired at the same time as Major League Baseball playoffs. It received a rating of 2.3, which was 0.3 lower than a re-run of "The Xindi" a week later at the same time as the World Series. The critical response was generally positive.

== Plot ==
Sub-Commander T'Pol, examining gravitational anomaly patterns, calculates the location of a second sphere within the Delphic Expanse and Enterprise diverts course to investigate. (Note: Similar to the sphere previously seen in "Anomaly") Ensign Sato is contacted telepathically by Tarquin, an alien that appears to her in human form.

Enterprise soon arrives at Tarquin's planet. He welcomes Archer and Hoshi and explains that he can telepathically read objects, and suggests that Enterprise bring him a Xindi object; they give him part of the weapon used to attack Earth. (Note: In "The Expanse") He adds a condition, he will only help them if Sato agrees to remain while he works. They reluctantly agree, and Enterprise departs to investigate the second sphere. Tarquin and Sato discuss many subjects and initially the alien seems trustworthy. She also discovers that he had been watching her telepathically for some time and that she is not the first person to be brought here to provide companionship for him; the graves of four earlier companions lie outside his home.

Enterprise approaches the sphere, but has to halt its approach due to damage from the spatial anomalies generated by it. The ship sends down a shuttlepod insulated with Trellium-D and is able to approach close enough to take readings. (Note: In the episode "Impulse") Archer and Trip return to Enterprise and set course to retrieve Sato. Tarquin tries to trick her into staying with him but she refuses and threatens to destroy a device which enhances his telepathic abilities. He reluctantly agrees to let her go and later provides Enterprise with the co-ordinates for the Xindi colony that is building a part of the weapon. T'Pol's analysis reveals that there are at least fifty spheres in the expanse.

== Production ==
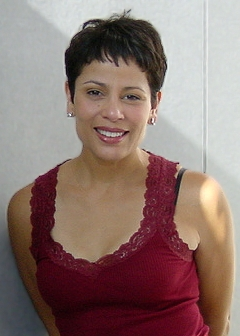
Roxann Dawson directed this episode. In addition to directing several Star Trek episodes, she had also starred as Chief Engineer Torres on Star Trek: Voyager

Both Linda Park and executive producer Rick Berman saw "Exile" as a play on Beauty and the Beast. Filming began on August 20, 2003, overlapping with the final day of shooting for the previous episode, "Impulse". Shooting ran through to August 29, the final working day before the Labor Day weekend. As Linda Park was the only member of the main cast to be required for scenes on the final day of shooting, the remaining cast began work on the following episode, "The Shipment". A number of sets were created for use in this episode, all of which were created to show Tarquin's home. Although this was only referred to in the script as an "alien sanctuary", the set designers created an aged gothic-inspired alien castle across five sets. Set decorator Jim Mees added to this design by filling the areas with further gothic artifacts and exotic flowers.

The subplot required several special effects to be added in post production to show how the sphere affects the Enterprise during its mission. These were supervised by Dan Curry. To portray Tarquin in his native form, Maury Sterling wore a full head prosthetic. The majority of the time spent filming was while Tarquin was telepathically communicating with Hoshi, where Sterling appeared as a human. The writer and director had close ties to Star Trek: Voyager. Roxann Dawson portrayed Chief Engineer B'Elanna Torres in that series, "Exile" being her sixth Enterprise directing credit. "Exile" writer and series co-producer Phyllis Strong had previously written episodes of Voyager.

== Reception ==
"Exile" was first aired in the United States on the UPN network on October 15, 2003, and was the first time the show was broadcast in High Definition. It received a 2.3/4 percentage share among all adults, including 4 percent of all adults watching television at the time of the broadcast. This was the lowest ratings the show had received so far during season three and blame was placed against the episode going up against coverage of the Major League Baseball play-off games. The episode which followed "Exile" during the following week was a repeat of the season premiere, "The Xindi". It was aired in order to avoid putting new episodes up against a game of the 2003 Baseball World Series on the Fox Network. That re-run received a 2.6 rating, which was higher than "Exile" from a week earlier.

Michelle Erica Green reviewed "Exile" for TrekNation, and found that it reminded her of the Voyager episode "Alter Ego" where a lonely alien contacts Tuvok whilst pretending to be a character on the holodeck. She also thought that Tarquin in particular was reminiscent of Flint from The Original Series episode "Requiem for Methuselah" due to the long life span of the character. She said that Tarquin's castle reminded her of a Disney Castle while other elements such as his communications device, were similar to something out of The Lord of the Rings. Jamahl Epsicokhan, at his website Jammer's Reviews, said that "Exile" was a well rounded episode but thought that it did not "venture as far as it could've and perhaps should've". He described the scene where Trip has problems with the shuttle as a "irrelevant but nevertheless great scene that's kind of brilliant in a Three Stooges kind of way". He gave the episode a score of three out of four.

== Home media release ==
The first home media release of "Exile" was as part of the season three DVD box set, released in the United States on September 27, 2005. The Blu-ray release of the third season of Enterprise took place on January 7, 2014.
