= Zero Hour (Star Trek: Enterprise) =

- Star Trek: Enterprise episode
- Episode no.: Season 3 Episode 24
- Directed by: Allan Kroeker
- Written by: Rick Berman; Brannon Braga
- Production code: 324
- Original air date: May 26, 2004

Guest appearances
- Scott MacDonald – Commander Dolim; Rick Worthy – Jannar; Tucker Smallwood – Xindi-Primate Councilor; Josette DiCarlo – Sphere-Builder Woman; Bruce Thomas – Xindi-Reptilian Soldier; Andrew Borba – Xindi-Reptilian Lieutenant; Matt Winston – Temporal Agent Daniels; Mary Mara – Sphere-Builder Presage; Ruth Williamson – Sphere-Builder Primary; Jeffrey Combs – Commander Shran; Günther Ziegler – German Doctor; J. Paul Boehmer – SS Officer; Zachary Krebs – Andorian

Episode chronology
← Previous "Countdown"	Next → "Storm Front"
- Star Trek: Enterprise season 3

"Zero Hour" is the twenty-fourth and season finale episode of the third season of the American science fiction television series Star Trek: Enterprise, the seventy-seventh episode overall. It first aired on May 26, 2004, on UPN within the United States. Set in the 22nd century, the series follows the adventures of the first Starfleet starship, Enterprise, registration NX-01. Season three features an ongoing story following an attack on Earth by previously unknown aliens called the Xindi.

In this episode, Sub-Commander T'Pol leads the Enterprise on an attack on Sphere 41 in an attempt to destroy the sphere network within the Delphic Expanse. Meanwhile, a team led by Captain Jonathan Archer has infiltrated the Xindi super-weapon while it is en route to Earth. Both the spheres and the weapon are destroyed, but Archer is lost, presumed dead. Enterprise returns to Earth but the crew suddenly find that they have been sent back in time to a very different Second World War.

The episode was written by series co-creators Rick Berman and Brannon Braga and was directed by Allan Kroeker. It took eight days to film and included two competition winners and a larger guest cast than normal. The twist at the end of "Zero Hour" was originally conceived by the writers as a joke, but was developed over the course of the third season to become the concept of "alien Nazis". This twist was further explained and resolved in the season four two-part opener "Storm Front". Roughly 3.91 million viewers watched "Zero Hour" on first broadcast.

== Plot ==
Sub-Commander T'Pol orders Enterprise to Sphere 41, a critical Sphere, in an attempt to destroy the entire sphere network. They arrive to find that the Sphere Builders have created a distortion field around it. Doctor Phlox determines that 12–15 minutes exposure will kill the crew. Undeterred, T'Pol and Commander Tucker devise a modification to the deflector dish that can be used to destroy the sphere. As they approach, two Guardians arrive and begin damaging the ship's systems, but they cannot prevent the sphere's destruction. It implodes, setting off a chain reaction that destroys the rest of the spheres, ending all spatial anomalies in the Delphic Expanse.

Meanwhile, Captain Archer, accompanied by Lieutenant Reed, Ensign Sato, and a team of MACOs, enters the vortex created by the Xindi super-weapon. During the pursuit, a recovering Sato is pushed by Archer to decipher Degra's schematics. Archer is suddenly pulled into the future by Temporal Agent Daniels, this time to the founding of the United Federation of Planets, but Archer is again uninterested. Arriving near Earth, Archer receives an unexpected transmission from Commander Shran, who engages and then destroys the Xindi-Reptilian ship. In the chaos, Archer and his team are able to beam aboard the weapon. A fierce fire-fight ensues, and as Archer and Sato try to disable the weapon, Commander Dolim attempts to stop them. Archer kills him and the weapon is destroyed.

Sato and Reed return to Enterprise and report to T'pol that Archer did not make it off the weapon. Ferried on an Xindi-Aquatic ship, Enterprise arrives back at Earth, but they are unable to contact Starfleet. T'Pol orders Tucker and Ensign Mayweather to fly a shuttlepod down to San Francisco, where they are attacked by what seem to be P-51s. In a World War II German field-hospital, a doctor summons some SS officers to examine the unfamiliar uniform of a burn patient. The patient is revealed as Archer and one of the SS personnel steps out of the shadows, showing himself to be a gray-skinned alien.

== Production ==
=== Writing and story ===
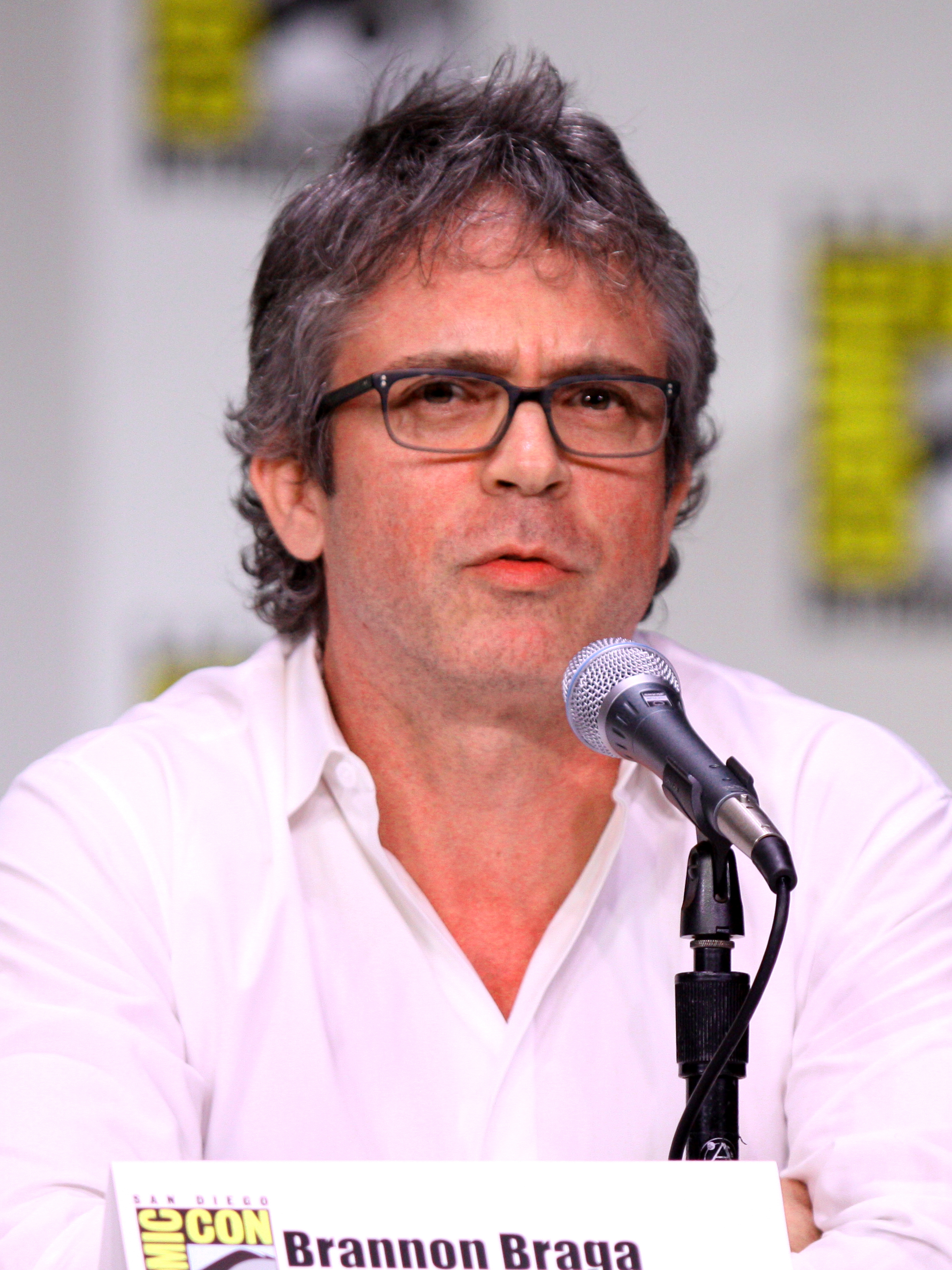
Brannon Braga envisaged "Zero Hour" as the third act in a story.

"Zero Hour" was the culmination of a season-long story arc first introduced by the events of "The Expanse", wherein an alien race called the Xindi attacks Earth and kills seven million people. During the course of the third season, the Enterprise went into the previously unexplored Delphic Expanse to search for the Xindi and to prevent a further attack which will destroy Earth. Executive producer and writer Brannon Braga felt that the end of the season in a three-part arc composed of "The Council", "Countdown" and "Zero Hour", which he compared to three acts of the same story. The episode was written by Braga alongside Rick Berman. The duo were the co-creators of Star Trek: Enterprise.

The idea that Enterprise would be successful in its mission was planned from the start of the development of the year-long story. However, the producers and writing team would joke that there would be a "bizarre twist" such as the crew returning to Earth and discovering that it was now ruled by giant cockroaches. The writers decided against a Xindi-based cliffhanger and sought an unusual twist. Braga said that "I can't remember who said 'Nazis,' but we just somehow ended up with Nazis. Then that didn't even feel like enough, so we decided to make them alien Nazis." He expected it would make the returning episode in season four "really interesting", and wanted to end the series on something "wacky". Most of the cast were not given the final few pages of the script until they were already in production. Actor Dominic Keating, who portrays Malcolm Reed on Enterprise, called the ending a "lovely twist... that just makes you scratch your head and wonder at what you've just seen." The twist was wrapped up at the start of season four with the two-part episode "Storm Front".

It was the third time that Nazis had appeared in the Star Trek franchise. The first was in the episode "Patterns of Force" in Star Trek: The Original Series, and then again on the holodeck on Star Trek: Voyager in the two-part "The Killing Game". In the episode, T'Pol states that "Zero Hour" takes place in 2152, a statement which contradicts other episodes. Manny Coto, executive producer and show runner for the following season, explained that this was a mistake in the script. It was later stated in the timeline published in Voyages of Imagination by Jeff Ayers that the events of "Zero Hour" took place on February 14, 2154, a day after the setting of the episode "Countdown".

=== Direction, filming and guest stars ===
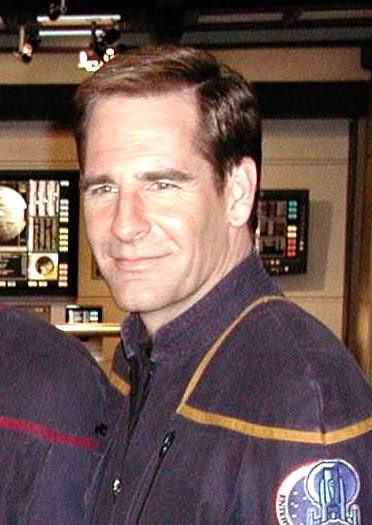
Scott Bakula said initially that there were three endings for "Zero Hour", but later explained that only one was filmed.

Allan Kroeker directed the episode. He had previously directed the season two closing episode "The Expanse", and the first episode of season three, "The Xindi". Previously in the franchise, he had directed the finale of both Star Trek: Deep Space Nine and Star Trek: Voyager. Production began on March 5 and was completed eight working days later. Because there was no ability to shoot scenes using a second unit during the production of a following episode, ten pages of script were shot on the final day of filming instead of the normal seven or eight. "Zero Hour" was the final episode of Enterprise to be shot on film stock, as for the following season, the decision was made to switch to high-definition digital video.

Scott Bakula stated in an interview on The Wayne Brady Show that there were three endings to the episode filmed. This was later denied by Dominic Keating while on stage at Creation Entertainment's Grand Slam event in Pasadena in March 2004. He did clarify that the script for the final scene was delivered to his house in three envelopes, accompanied by a security guard with a dog. Bakula explained later during an online chat for the official Star Trek website that only one ending was ever filmed.

"Zero Hour" featured a guest and stunt cast larger than usual for episodes of Enterprise. For the final day of filming, there were 35 extras on set. The additional actors appearing in "Zero Hour" included J. Paul Boehmer, who portrayed an SS agent at the end of the episode. Boehmer had appeared several times previous in the Star Trek franchise, and his first part ever as an actor was as a holographic Nazi Captain in the Voyager episode "The Killing Game". He had also previously appeared in Enterprise as the Vulcan Mestral in the episode "Carbon Creek". Boehmer returned to reprise his role from "Zero Hour" during the two-part "Storm Front" in season four. Boehmer noted that the episode was filmed with a higher than normal level of secrecy, as it was the first time he did not receive a complete script and was only given his specific pages, which included warnings not to disclose anything about the episode.

In addition to the actors appearing on the episode, two members of the public made walk on appearances as Starfleet crewmen on the engineering set. These were Amy Ulen, who had won the prize on KZOK-FM. She was a high school English and drama teacher. Joining her was DJ Bob Rivers from the Seattle-based UPN affiliate radio station. Also appearing was Brian D'Arcy who gained his role through a charity auction held by Wired magazine to benefit the Starbright Foundation. Ulen would later have a cameo in the fan production Star Trek: Of Gods and Men.

== Reception ==
=== Broadcast ===
"Zero Hour" was first broadcast on May 26, 2004, on the UPN network within the United States. It was watched by 3.91 million viewers. It received a Nielsen rating of 2.5/4 percent, which meant that it was seen by 2.5 percent of all households, and 4 percent of all households watching television at the time of the broadcast. "Zero Hour" placed UPN in fifth place in the ratings during the timeslot. The episode was first broadcast in the UK later that year on June 7, on Sky One.

Prior to the broadcast of the finale of season three, there were rumors that the series was going to be cancelled. UPN decided to renew the series, but moved it for season four to Friday nights, and so "Zero Hour" was the final episode of Enterprise to be broadcast on a Wednesday evening.

=== Critical response ===
Michelle Erica Green, in her review for TrekNation, found the ending of the episode amusing, describing it as an "insane left hook of a cliffhanger". She praised the character development elsewhere in the episode, but kept returning to what she described as "EVIL ALIEN NAZIS". Jamahl Epsicokhan, at his website Jammer's Reviews, gave the episode two and a half out of four stars. He said that the episode featured several science fiction clichés, such as having the Xindi weapon destroyed in Earth's orbit. He said that the final scene of the episode was the "Ultimate WTF ending" and compared it to the "jarring" finale of Tim Burton's version of the film Planet of the Apes. IGN gave the episode 1.5 out of 5, and said "while parts of the episode had flashes of what the series should be, it was still as big a mess as the rest of Season 3." They criticized the ending of a season long plot arc with a cliffhanger.

WhatCulture ranked this episode the 12th worst episode of the Star Trek franchise.

James Gray writing for The Digital Fix was positive about the episode, concluding that it was a "satisfyingly action-packed climax to the season". The Digital Fix said that this episode, and preceding "Countdown", were "an exciting end to an ambitious season."

== Awards ==
Michael Westmore, make-up supervisor on Enterprise, was nominated for Outstanding Makeup for a Series, Miniseries, Movie or a Special (Prosthetic) at the 2004 Emmy Awards for his work on "Zero Hour". The award instead went to James McKinnon for his work on an episode of Nip/Tuck.

== Home media release ==
The first home media release of "Zero Hour" was as part of the season three DVD box set, released in the United States on September 27, 2005. The Blu-ray release of Enterprise was announced in early 2013, and season three was released on January 7, 2014. The Blu-Ray has a surround sound 5.1 DTS-HD Master Audio track for English, as well as German, French, and Japanese audio tracks. Jay Chattaway's music for the episode was released as part of the four disc Star Trek: Enterprise Collection on December 2, 2014, including the orchestral pieces "Sphere Builder On Board / Andorian Offensive / Sphere / Final Showdown" and "My Captain".
