= Damage (Star Trek: Enterprise) =

- Star Trek: Enterprise episode
- Episode no.: Season 3 Episode 19
- Directed by: James L. Conway
- Written by: Phyllis Strong
- Production code: 319
- Original air date: April 21, 2004

Guest appearances
- Casey Biggs - Illyrian Captain; Randy Oglesby - Degra; Scott MacDonald - Commander Dolim; Tucker Smallwood - Xindi-Primate; Rick Worthy - Jannar; Josette DiCarlo - Sphere-Builder Woman

Episode chronology
| ← Previous "Azati Prime" | Next → "The Forgotten" |
- Star Trek: Enterprise season 3

"Damage" is the seventy-first episode of the science fiction television series Star Trek: Enterprise, the nineteenth episode of the third season. It is set in the 22nd century of the Star Trek universe, with Captain Archer commanding the Starfleet starship NX-01 Enterprise in its maiden flight to explore space and to meet alien species. The episode aired on UPN on April 21, 2004.

This episode is a continuation of the Xindi story arc from the previous episode, "Azati Prime." Star Trek: Deep Space Nine recurring guest star Casey Biggs (who had also played Damar in Star Trek) is featured as an Illyrian captain.

== Plot ==
Even though Enterprise is severely damaged, the Xindi unexpectedly break off the attack of the previous episode. Reptilian Commander Dolim is angered by the recall after the other Xindi begin to doubt that Enterprise represents the same threat they previously imagined. The Primate Degra argues that the evidence of interference in Xindi culture, provided earlier by Captain Archer, must be discussed first. Dolim submits, and the Aquatics send Archer back to Enterprise in an escape pod. He arrives to find the ship in disarray, with at least fourteen members of the crew dead. The ship needs a replacement warp coil in order to travel at warp.

Although adrift, Enterprise encounters an Illyrian spacecraft, damaged by the gravimetric energy generated by the Delphic Expanse. Archer attempts to trade with the captain, but he refuses to give up their sole warp coil. Meanwhile, a partial Xindi Council (Degra; another Primate council member, and Jannar, an Arboreal) communicate with "the Guardian" - the audience's first view of the prophetic time traveler of the trans-dimensional, "Sphere-Builder" species. The Guardian admits to transporting the Reptilians into the past (as per the episode "Carpenter Street"), and encouraging Reptilians and Insectoids to remain on the Council. Upset, Degra insists on further examining Archer's evidence regarding the Guardian-Sphere Builder connection.

Meanwhile, Ensign Sato discovers a message from Degra hidden aboard the Xindi escape pod, asking Enterprise to rendezvous with him in a few days at a nearby location. Unable to travel at warp, Archer is forced to attack the Illyrian vessel and steal their coil, although this will leave them unable to reach home for three years. Archer's decision is met with an angry outburst from Sub-Commander T'Pol, but Archer justifies his actions as a necessity of war, saving billions of lives while making the Illyrian's journey more perilous. The episode reveals T'Pol hid a three-month addiction to Trellium-D, which she finally admits to Doctor Phlox. Unusually for a Vulcan, it has left her experiencing emotions. Despite further damage, the raid is successful, and Enterprise heads for the covert rendezvous.

== Production ==
The episode was written by Phyllis Strong, who contributed four scripts to Star Trek: Voyager, and was executive story editor for Star Trek: Enterprise from the show's inception in 2001 until September 2002, when she was promoted to co-producer. (Strong left the show at the conclusion of its third season in May 2004.) This was her 13th and last script for Enterprise.

Casey Biggs who played the Illyrian Captain, is better known for starring as the Cardassian Damar, on Star Trek: Deep Space Nine. The producers told him “Well, we’re creating a new race here,” and he was interested to be a part of that but they never wrote any more about the Illyrians. The species of the aliens encountered in this episode is not mentioned on-screen but was identified in the episode's script. Illyrians with the design shown have not appeared in later productions, but the identification has been reinforced by writers of Star Trek: Strange New Worlds and by tie-in fiction such as Star Trek: Strange New Worlds - The Illyrian Enigma.

Production ran from Tuesday, January 13 to Thursday, January 22.

== Reception ==
James Gray writing for The Digital Fix was positive about the episode, and noted "the three episode run 'Azati Prime' – 'Damage' – 'The Forgotten' easily as thrilling as anything seen in modern Trek." PaperBlog.com rated "Damage" the tenth best of all Star Trek: Enterprise episodes. It praised the show's contravention of standard Star Trek character rules, noting, "there is a certain set of expectations as to how Star Trek characters will behave in most scenarios. That's why it's so interesting when that doesn't happen." The review found Jonathan Archer's self-loathing for committing theft well-written and an important characterization. The A.V. Club gave this an honorable mention, in their list of recommended Enterprise television episodes. The Hollywood Reporter ranked "Damage" as the 77th best episode of all Star Trek episodes (up to that time). They note how this episode shocked audiences by departing from what was expected of a Star Trek captain; Archer's actions were hypocritical to the goal of establishing a good reputation for humans in the universe. Business Insider listed "Damage" as one of the most underrated episodes of the Star Trek franchise at that time. They compare the moral ambiguities to the DS9 episode "In the Pale Moonlight" but unlike Sisko who struggles to justify his actions, Archer is resigned to the fact his mission means he will sometimes have to cross the line. The Digital Fix said this was the "darkest" episode of the series, with a focus on character development.

== Bibliography ==
- Erdmann, Terry J.; Block, Paula M. (2008). Star Trek 101: A Practical Guide to Who, What, Where, and Why. New York: Pocket Books. ISBN 9780743497237.
