= The Shipment =

The Shipment may refer to:

- "The Shipment" (Star Trek: Enterprise), a 2003 TV episode
- The Shipment (film), 2001
