= Extinction (Star Trek: Enterprise) =

- Star Trek: Enterprise episode
- Episode no.: Season 3 Episode 3
- Directed by: LeVar Burton
- Written by: André Bormanis
- Production code: 303
- Original air date: September 24, 2003

Guest appearances
- Roger Cross – Tret; Daniel Dae Kim – Corporal Chang; Troy Mittleider – Palmer; Philip Boyd – Com Officer; Brian J. Williams – Alien Decon Agent

Episode chronology
← Previous "Anomaly"	Next → "Rajiin"
- Star Trek: Enterprise season 3

"Extinction" is the 55th episode of the American science fiction television series Star Trek: Enterprise, the third episode of season three. It first aired on September 24, 2003 on UPN in the United States. This was the first episode to include the prefix "Star Trek" in the title of the series. Set in the 22nd century just prior to the formation of the United Federation of Planets, the series follows the adventures of Starfleet's first Warp 5 starship, Enterprise, registration NX-01.

Season three of Enterprise features an ongoing story following an attack on Earth by a previously unknown alien race called the Xindi. In this episode, while investigating a planet visited by the Xindi, several crew members, including Captain Jonathan Archer, become infected with a virus that mutates them into another species. While they develop a cure, the Enterprise crew must prevent an alien race from exterminating the mutated crew members. The episode was written by story editor André Bormanis and directed by Star Trek: The Next Generation alumnus LeVar Burton.

"Extinction" was shot across seven days, with the soundstage transformed into an alien jungle for filming. John Eaves designed a Xindi pod, as well as an alien spaceship which he strongly disliked. Jolene Blalock, Scott Bakula, Linda Park and Dominic Keating were each required to undergo extended make-up sessions during six days of the shoot in order to show their characters in various states of mutation. Around four million viewers watched "Extinction" on first broadcast, but the critical reception was mixed. Although the actors who underwent additional make-up were praised, the plot was found to be similar to previous episodes in the franchise and the ending was considered poor.

== Plot ==
On Enterprise, Sub-Commander T'Pol is called to the command center by Captain Archer. Archer tells her that he has located a nearby planet that the Xindi recently visited. Both travel down to the surface with Lieutenant Reed and Ensign Sato. They discover a Xindi shuttle along with two dead crewmembers, one of whom has been incinerated. With little warning, Archer, Sato and Reed begin to transform physically and mentally into a different species. Within seconds they are fully changed. T'Pol is only mildly affected physically, appearing somewhat resistant.

After a physical altercation with her transformed crewmates, T'Pol is able to communicate with Archer by gaining use of the universal translator. She learns they have been overcome with an overwhelming instinct to reach a city called "Urquat", the homeland of their species. Commander Tucker and an away team of MACOs, equipped with biohazard suits, manage to capture and return Reed to the ship. Archer and Sato flee and T'Pol opts to stay with them. Doctor Phlox soon determines that they were infected by a mutagenic virus and concludes that T'Pol's Vulcan genetics rendered her partially immune.

Two "containment ships" soon arrive, demanding access to Enterprise to stop the virus that killed millions of their people 60 years earlier. Tucker refuses, but invites their leader, Tret, aboard. Tret explains that the original inhabitants of the planet, the Loque'eque, created the virus in a last ditch effort to continue their species. Believing it impossible to cure, he sends a team to the planet's surface to neutralize Archer and Sato. Archer leads Sato and T'Pol to Urquat, but they find it in ruins. Tucker beams down with a team of MACOs and rescues them. Enterprise warps away, but the alien ships pursue and attack the ship. Tucker asks Tret to allow Phlox more time to synthesize an antidote with T'pol's genes, but Tret refuses. Before he can board the ship, Phlox arrives with Archer and Sato—now mostly restored—and promises Tret a sample. Later, as Phlox plans to destroy the last vial of the virus, Archer tells him to keep it as the last remnant of the near-extinct species.

== Production ==
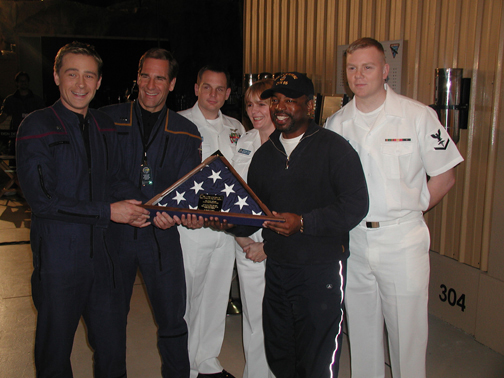
LeVar Burton, Connor Trinneer and Scott Bakula meet representatives of the aircraft carrier USS Enterprise

The episode was directed by LeVar Burton, who had directed more than twenty Trek episodes and played Geordi La Forge in Star Trek: The Next Generation. Scott Bakula praised Burton's work on Enterprise, saying that he had a "great energy and a great sense of fun" and said that the flame-throwers in "Extinction" got the former TNG actor "excited". The writer, André Bormanis, was previously the science advisor for the various Star Trek series and was the story editor on Enterprise. Joining the cast in a guest role as Tret was Roger Cross, who had appeared in several science fiction series such as The X-Files, Stargate SG-1 and Andromeda. He also appeared alongside Burton's The Next Generation co-star, Patrick Stewart, in X2: X-Men United. Returning in the same role he played in "The Xindi", the first episode of season three, was Daniel Dae Kim as Corporal Chang.

Filming on "Extinction" began on July 31, 2003, with a shoot that lasted the following seven working days. To represent the jungle of the alien planet, the soundstage was inundated with foliage. A Xindi landing pod was created to appear in those scenes. Several of the main cast were required to undergo extended make-up sessions lasting three or four hours every day for six days of the shoot for their characters to appear in stages of mutation. The make-up on Jolene Blalock was not as extensive as that on Scott Bakula, Dominic Keating and Linda Park due to her character's Vulcan anatomy. Both Bakula and Keating had to wear bladders on their throats as a special effect which were inflated when they growled. Following the experience, Park praised John Billingsley, who in his role as Doctor Phlox has to undertake similar make-up regimes for every episode.

Both the Xindi landing pod and the alien spaceship were designed by John Eaves. He also produced a series of designs for a Vulcan shuttle which ended up being written out of the episode. The Xindi pod went through three designs being approved, while the alien spaceship was accepted on the first submission. However Eaves regretted this, as he had submitted a spaceship design which he strongly disliked, calling it "by far my least favorite of anything I have ever drawn". It was based on a hatchet housed in a tool pouch. Eaves also developed the concept artwork for the alien temple.

This was the first episode of the series following the title change from Enterprise to Star Trek: Enterprise, and so it was the first time that the new title card appeared. Also, "Extinction" was dedicated to Jerry Fleck, which appeared at the end of the episode before the credits. He had died in his sleep during the filming of the episode "Twilight" and was working on pre-production for "North Star".

== Reception ==
"Extinction" was first aired on September 24, 2003, on UPN within the United States. It received a 2.5/4 percent share of the television audience, meaning that it was seen by 2.5 percent of all households, and 4 percent of all households watching television at the time of the broadcast. It was viewed by approximately four million viewers, making it the lowest viewed episode of season three at this point.

Michelle Erica Green reviewed the episode for TrekNation, saying it was a typical "crewmembers transform into scary aliens" episode. She compared it to similar episodes from elsewhere in the Star Trek franchise such as "Genesis" from Star Trek: The Next Generation and "Threshold" from Star Trek: Voyager. She had hope for a twist in the story, but instead found the ending of the episode "superfluous" and "sanctimonious". She praised Jolene Blalock for "keeping T'Pol credible and sympathetic", and Linda Park and Scott Bakula for the scenes in which they played the transformed versions of their characters.

== Home media release ==
The first home media release of "Extinction" was as part of the season three DVD box set, released in the United States on September 27, 2005. The Blu-ray release of the third season of Enterprise took place on January 7, 2014.
