= The Forgotten (Star Trek: Enterprise) =

- Star Trek: Enterprise episode
- Episode no.: Season 3 Episode 20
- Directed by: LeVar Burton
- Written by: Chris Black; David A. Goodman
- Production code: 320
- Original air date: April 28, 2004

Guest appearances
- Randy Oglesby - Degra; Rick Worthy - Jannar; Bob Morrisey - Xindi-Reptilian Captain; Seth MacFarlane - Ensign Rivers; Kipleigh Brown - Taylor

Episode chronology
← Previous "Damage"	Next → "E²"
- Star Trek: Enterprise season 3

"The Forgotten" is the seventy-second episode of the American science fiction television series Star Trek: Enterprise, the twentieth episode of season three. It first aired on April 28, 2004, on UPN in the United States.

Set in the 22nd century, the series follows the adventures of the first Starfleet starship Enterprise, registration NX-01. Season three of Enterprise features an ongoing story following an attack on Earth by previously unknown aliens called the Xindi - a group of five surviving races who each evolved on the same planet. The Enterprise enters the Delphic Expanse seeking to stop the super-weapon with which the Xindi intend to destroy Earth.

== Plot ==
Captain Archer tells the crew that they will continue their mission, but will remember the 18 crew members who died in the recent battle with the Xindi ("Azati Prime"). He directs Enterprise to rendezvous with Degra. He also orders Commander Tucker to write a letter to the parents of Jane Taylor, a member of his engineering team who died in a recent battle. Also, Sub-Commander T'Pol discusses with Doctor Phlox the consequences of her Trellium addiction, and is troubled when he tells her the inability to fully control her emotions may be permanent.

Arriving at a sphere, Enterprise is soon approached by Degra and Jannar's ship, who Archer then invites on board in an attempt to gain their trust. He then reveals his evidence: the Reptilian corpses and technology of the failed viral attack against 2004 Earth (per the episode "Carpenter Street"), images of the dying alien who attempted to destroy the ship, and scans of the interior of a sphere. He again reiterates that Humans and Xindi are destined to form an alliance to stop the Sphere Builders' incursion in the future. But he also demands that Degra reveal information about the weapon and its launch schedule. An increasingly persuaded Degra promises to do what he can to delay it.

Meanwhile, a dangerous plasma fire erupts unnoticed on Enterprise's hull. Initially, the blaze is small, but it expands progressively until Tucker and Lieutenant Reed are forced to undertake an extravehicular activity to extinguish it. Throughout the crises, Tucker repeatedly undermines the Captain's authority by reviling Degra for the suffering he caused during the first attack on Earth that killed his sister. To make matters worse, a large Reptilian ship arrives and they are forced to work together to destroy it, despite Degra's reluctance to attack fellow Xindi. With their pact now sealed, Degra suggests a meeting with the rest of the Council, and provides Archer with the coordinates.

== Production ==
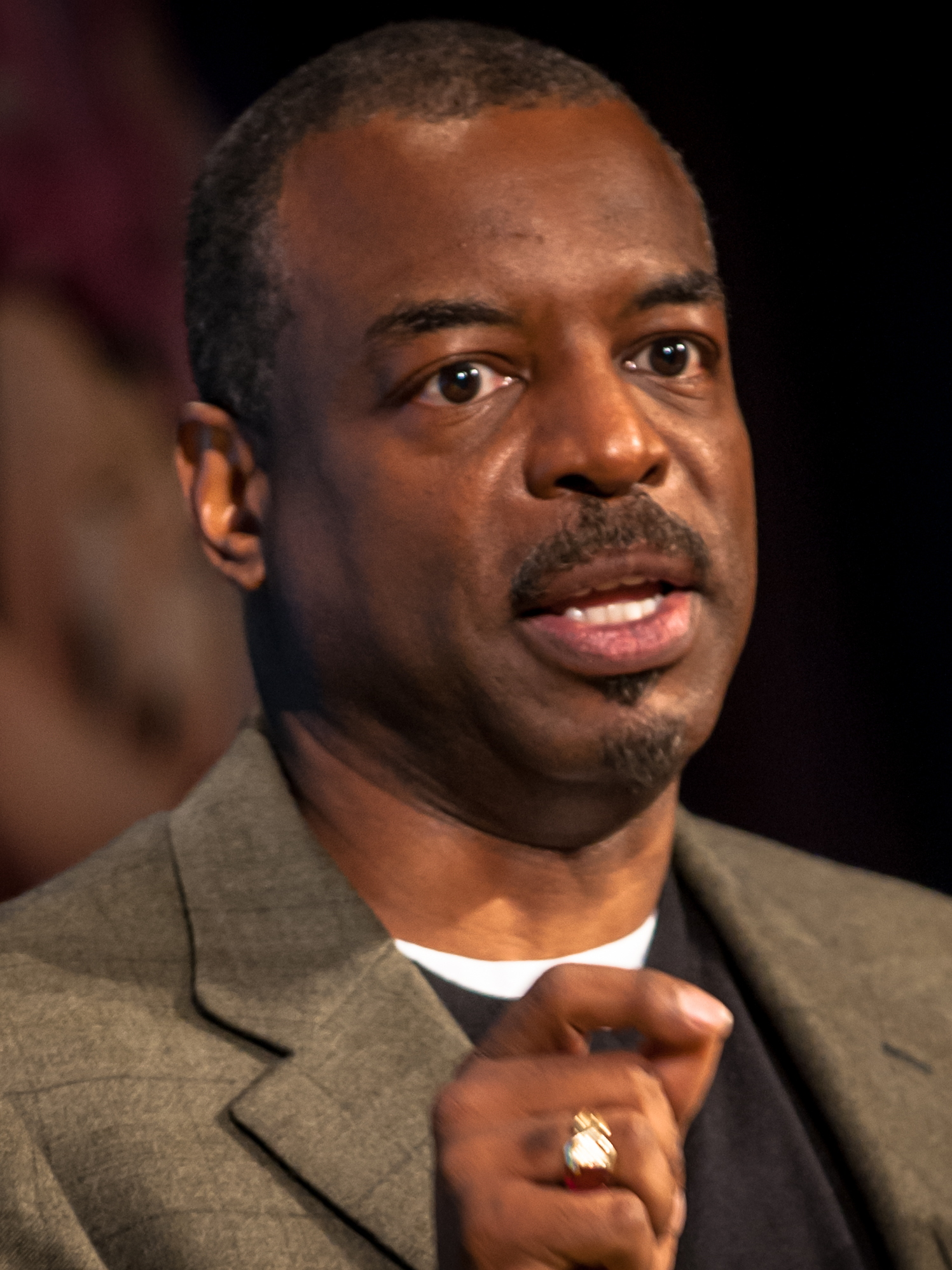
"The Forgotten" was the seventh episode of Enterprise to be directed by LeVar Burton.

The episode was the third of the season to be directed by Star Trek: The Next Generation alumnus LeVar Burton. He had previously directed two episodes in each of the first two seasons of the show. "The Forgotten" marked the first episode jointly written by Chris Black and David A. Goodman. They had each written several episodes of the series previously on a solo basis, and Goodman also wrote the Star Trek themed Futurama episode "Where No Fan Has Gone Before". Goodman praised Black for his work on the script saying Chris was "a very gifted writer who was also very confident and understanding of what the rules were for writing for Star Trek Enterprise."

Both Randy Oglesby and Rick Worthy returned in their recurring guest roles as members of the Xindi council, while Bob Morrisey returned to Enterprise as a Reptilian Captain, having previously appeared in the episode "Stigma" as Doctor Strom. Joining in a brief appearance as an Engineer in "The Forgotten" was Seth MacFarlane, creator of the television series Family Guy. He made one further appearance in the series, in the season four episode "Affliction" where his character was given the name of Ensign Rivers.

Production began on "The Forgotten" on January 23, 2004 and overlapped with three other episodes. This meant that the first day's shoot only involved Connor Trinneer, Jolene Blalock and Kipleigh Brown. When filming resumed after the weekend, the rest of the cast joined in the shooting on "The Forgotten" using a variety of standing sets for the Enterprise showing damage resulting from the action in earlier episodes. An additional set which made its first appearance was the morgue on the ship, which was holding three Reptilian-Xindi from the episode "Carpenter Street". Filming concluded on February 2, with an additional special effects shoot for the outside hull effects on the following day with Trinneer and Dominic Keating. The remainder of the cast began filming on the following episode, "E²".

== Reception ==
"The Forgotten" was first aired in the United States on UPN on April 28, 2004. According to Nielsen Media Research, it received a 2.2/4 percent share among adults. This means that it was seen by 2.2 percent of all households, and 4 percent of all of those watching television at the time of the broadcast. The episode broadcast after this episode, "E²", received the same ratings as "The Forgotten". This was an increase from the previous episode, "Damage", which had received a 2.0/3 percent share and was the lowest watched episode of the season.

TV Guide noted "The Forgotten" for a cameo by Seth MacFarlane, famous as a voice actor for several animated shows in the early 2000s; he also appears in the episode "Affliction".

James Gray writing for The Digital Fix was positive about the episode, and noted "the three episode run of "Azati Prime", "Damage" and "The Forgotten" is easily as thrilling as anything seen in modern Trek." The A.V. Club gave this an honorable mention in their list of recommended Enterprise television episodes. The Digital Fix said this "powerful episode" in season 3, highlighting a crew struggling with their losses in the previous episode, and Archer's struggle for peace. Keith DeCandido of Tor.com gave it 10 out of 10.

== Home media release ==
The first home media release of "The Forgotten" was as part of the season three DVD box set, released in the United States on September 27, 2005. The Blu-ray release of Enterprise was announced in early 2013, and released on January 7, 2014.
