= Rajiin =

- Star Trek: Enterprise episode
- Episode no.: Season 3 Episode 4
- Directed by: Mike Vejar
- Story by: Paul Brown; Brent V. Friedman
- Teleplay by: Brent V. Friedman; Chris Black
- Production code: 304
- Original air date: October 1, 2003

Guest appearances
- Nikita Ager - Rajiin; Tucker Smallwood - Xindi-Primate Councilor; Randy Oglesby - Degra; Rick Worthy - Jannar; Scott MacDonald - Commander Dolim; Steve Larson - Zjod; Dell Yount - B'Rat; B.K. Kennelly - Alien Merchant; Ken Lally - Lt. Taylor

Episode chronology
← Previous "Extinction"	Next → "Impulse"
- Star Trek: Enterprise season 3

"Rajiin" is the 56th episode of the American science fiction television series Star Trek: Enterprise, the fourth episode of season three. It first aired on October 1, 2003, on UPN in the United States. It was written by Brent V. Friedman and Chris Black from a story idea from Friedman and Paul Brown, and directed by Mike Vejar.

Set in the 22nd century, the series follows the adventures of the first Starfleet starship Enterprise, registration NX-01. Season three of Enterprise features an ongoing story following an attack on Earth by previously unknown aliens called the Xindi. In this episode, Captain Jonathan Archer (Scott Bakula) and the crew visit an alien bazaar seeking a formula to help protect the ship against the anomalies in the Delphic Expanse. They bring back on board a former slave called Rajiin (Nikita Ager), whose motivations are not what the crew initially believe.

Several sets were built for the episode, including the alien bazaar. Filming took longer than the normal seven days, with secondary shoots taking an additional day and a half. It was the highest-rated episode of the season so far, with 4.52 million viewers watching the first broadcast. The critical reception was mixed with criticism levelled at its "gratuitous" female sexuality, but the reviewers were pleased that it showed a sense of continuity in the overall Xindi arc with it described as a "space opera".

== Plot ==
The Xindi Council meet to discuss the progress of Enterprise. Although the Reptilians and Insectoids want to attack the humans, Degra advises them to continue with the plan to build the superweapon. On Enterprise, Sub-Commander T'Pol continues to help Commander Tucker with Vulcan neuropressure sessions. The crew, seeking the formula for a compound to reinforce the ship's hull against spatial anomalies, approach an ocean planet with a vast floating bazaar. Captain Archer leads an away team to meet with B'Rat Ud, who they have come into contact with.

After bartering, he sells them the formula for liquid trellium-D, and also informs them that the Xindi recently visited a merchant nearby. Archer meets the merchant, Zjod, a slaver who tries to sell him a female called Rajiin. Archer refuses and leaves, but Rajiin chases after him. Following a fight between Archer and Zjod, the away team leave with Rajiin, and Archer promises to return her to her home planet. Later she approaches Archer in his quarters, and as she nears him she puts him in a trance, and he no longer remembers her visit. Meanwhile, T'Pol and Tucker attempt to replicate the chemical from B'Rat's formula but the first attempt fails.

Afterwards, T'Pol returns to her cabin and is surprised to find Rajiin inside. She tries to resist, but is soon overcome. Rajiin attempts to flee using the transporter, but is quickly captured and placed in the brig. As Archer attempts to question her, Lieutenant Reed informs him that two Reptilian ships are on an intercept course. Rajiin admits she was gathering information for the Xindi Reptilians who, after battles with the crew, retrieve Rajiin and take her back to one of the ships. Enterprise attempts to pursue, but the Xindi enter a subspace vortex. Afterwards, the Xindi Council convenes again to discuss the development and construction of a new bio-weapon, a project helped by Archer's bio-data that was stolen by Rajiin.

== Production ==
Filming on "Rajiin" began on July 30, 2003, and primary shooting concluded after seven days filming on August 7. The second unit continued on August 8, with a further half day of shooting taking place the following week during the filming of the following episode "Impulse". This was the first episode to be worked on by Brent V. Friedman, who had joined the staff as a Consulting Producer. He had previously been a producer on other similar genre television series such as Dark Skies and The Twilight Zone. "Rajiin" was directed by Mike Vejar, who had previously directed episodes of The Next Generation, Deep Space Nine and Voyager. This was his fifth episode of Enterprise, and his first of season three.

Several sets were built for this episode, including an alien bazaar and a chemical laboratory. As the Xindi council returned in Rajiin for the first time after the first episode of the season "The Xindi", the guest stars who had appeared as their members returned. These included Tucker Smallwood, Randy Oglesby, Rick Worthy and Scott MacDonald. The titular character, Rajiin, was played by Nikita Ager. She had recently appeared in the television film Mermaids, which had also been co-written by Friedman. Main cast member Dominic Keating described Ager, saying "This girl is HOT! Oh my word. I forgot my lines a couple of times." Scott Bakula compared her character to Mata Hari and said Ager "did a wonderful job, and again, in a role that demanded a lot of different things from her." Dell Yount appeared as B'Rat; he had previously appeared in the Deep Space Nine episode "Sons of Mogh".

== Reception ==
"Rajiin" was first aired on October 1, 2003, on UPN. It received a 2.7/4% share, meaning that it was seen by 2.6 percent of all households, and 4 percent of all households watching television at the time of the broadcast. This translated to approximately 4.52 million viewers. It was the highest-rated episode of season three at that point, despite it going up against Smallville on The WB for the first time this season.

Michelle Erica Green of TrekNation, said that she was pleased with the continuity seen in "Rajiin" but felt that the female sexuality seen in this episode was the "most gratuitous... I can remember on Trek". She thought that the Rajiin character was a cliché, calling her a "trained slut who comes on to everyone around her". Green described the overall plot as "feeble", but praised the alien bazaar set. Jamahl Epsicokhan, on his website Jammer's Reviews, said that "Rajiin" demonstrated that there was an intention for the Xindi story arc to be a fully fledged space opera. He thought that the episode was average for the third season, and wasn't as good as "Anomaly". He felt that the scenes were reminiscent of comic books, saying that "There's nothing really wrong with that. Nothing great about it either." He gave it a score of 2.5 out of 4.

== Home media release ==
The first home media release of "Rajiin" was as part of the season three DVD box set, released in the United States on September 27, 2005. The Blu-ray release of the third season of Enterprise took place on January 7, 2014.
