= Twilight (Star Trek: Enterprise) =

- Star Trek: Enterprise episode
- Episode no.: Season 3 Episode 8
- Directed by: Robert Duncan McNeill
- Written by: Michael Sussman
- Production code: 308
- Original air date: November 5, 2003

Guest appearances
- Gary Graham - Ambassador Soval; Brett Rickaby - Yedrin Koss; Richard Anthony Crenna - Guard

Episode chronology
← Previous "The Shipment"	Next → "North Star"
- Star Trek: Enterprise season 3

"Twilight" is the eighth episode of the third season of the American science fiction television series Star Trek: Enterprise, originally broadcast on UPN on November 5, 2003. It was the sixtieth episode of the series overall. It was written by co-producer Michael Sussman, and directed by former Star Trek: Voyager actor Robert Duncan McNeill.

Set in the 22nd century, the series follows the adventures of the first Starfleet starship Enterprise, registration NX-01. In this episode, following an accident, Captain Jonathan Archer's (Scott Bakula) long term memory is affected and he is relieved of duty. The crew of the Enterprise subsequently fail to stop the Xindi attack on Earth resulting in the remnants of the human race resettling another planet. Dr Phlox (John Billingsley) finds a way of curing Archer in the past, in the hope that it would undo everything since the Captain was originally injured.

The episode and script was praised by Bakula during the shoot, which required the actors and sets to be aged to appear older in later time frames. Production was suspended for a day following the death (at home) of first assistant director Jerry Fleck, who was in pre-production on the next planned episode, "North Star", which subsequently resulted in crew changes on "Twilight". References in the episode were made to locations previously mentioned in the Star Trek: The Original Series episode "Space Seed" and the film Star Trek II: The Wrath of Khan. On first broadcast, "Twilight" was watched by 3.88 million viewers, more than the following episode. The critical response was positive.

== Plot ==
While rescuing Sub-Commander T'Pol from a spatial anomaly, Captain Archer is infected by subspace parasites in his cerebral cortex, resulting in anterograde amnesia. His condition prevents him from forming new long-term memories. This allows him to remember everything prior to the accident, but any new memories fade within a few hours. It soon becomes clear that Archer is not fit for duty, and he is subsequently relieved of his command. T'Pol is granted a field commission to Captain, but the mission fails and Earth, alongside every other human colony, is destroyed by the Xindi weapon. The few surviving humans form a convoy, led by the Enterprise, which travels to the planet Ceti Alpha V.

Twelve years pass and Archer, still plagued by memory loss, lives with T'Pol in a house on the colony. She has given up her career to care for him. They are visited by Doctor Phlox, who has finally developed a cure after years of research. He also discovers that when the subspace radiation treatments kill one of the parasite clusters in Archer's brain, it also vanishes from every other previous medical scan – as if the parasite had never existed. Therefore, since Archer will never have been infected, he would have remained Captain and possibly prevented the chain of events that led to Earth's destruction.

Unfortunately, the ship, now captained by Captain Tucker, is observed and attacked by Xindi vessels before the treatments can be completed. The Enterprise is outnumbered and heavily damaged and the entire bridge crew are killed. Phlox, T'Pol, and Archer race to create a subspace implosion to kill the parasites. As their procedure nears completion, Phlox, T'Pol and Archer himself are wounded by Xindi invaders but Archer manages to complete the procedure. The ship is destroyed in the subspace implosion, but their plan works and the subspace parasites are also destroyed by the implosion, and wiped out through time. The timeline is reset; Archer is in sickbay recovering from a physical injury but will never develop the amnesia he originally suffered.

== Production ==
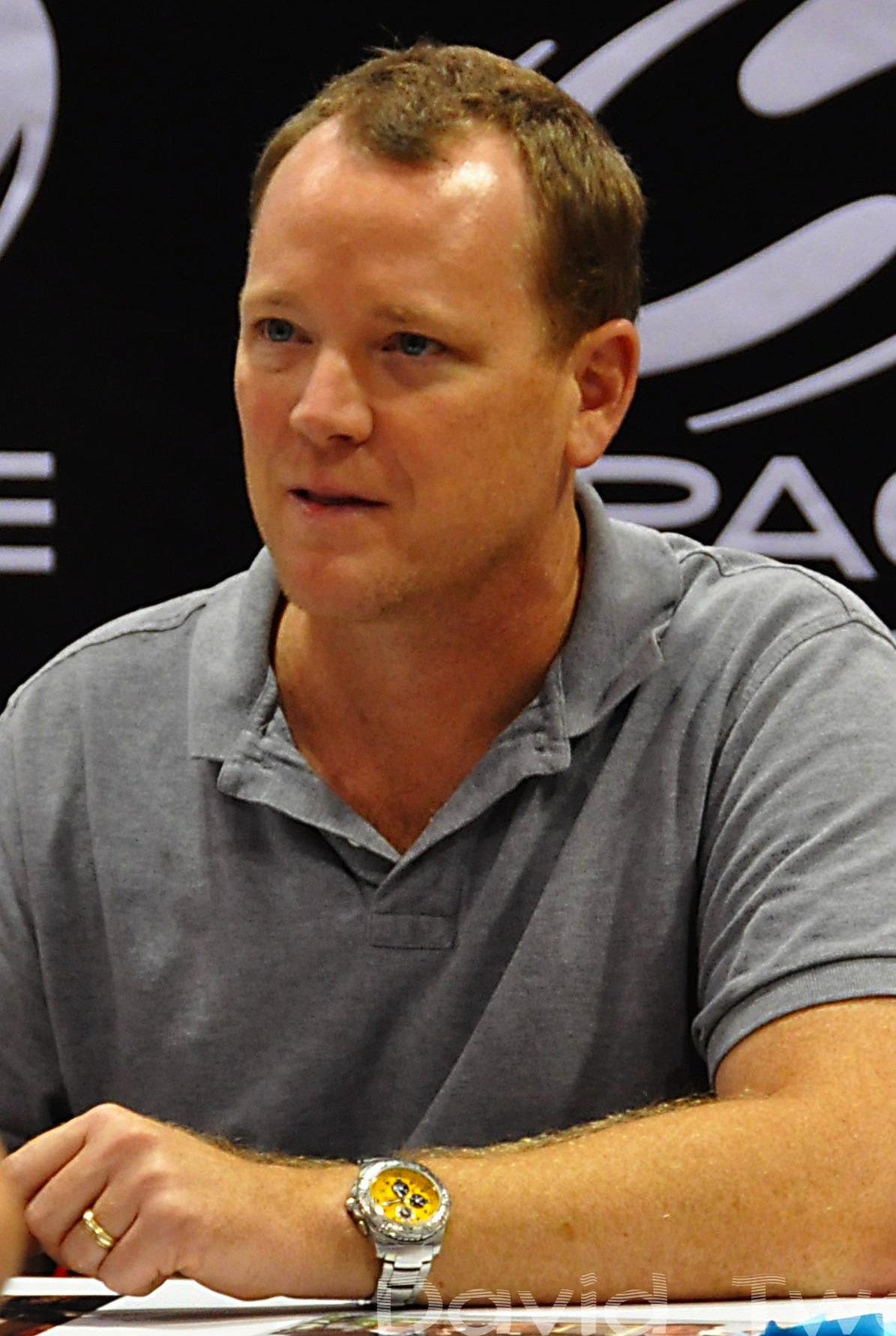
"Twilight" was the third episode of Enterprise to be directed by Robert Duncan McNeill

"Twilight" was written by Enterprise co-producer Mike Sussman, who had previously pitched the story as an episode of Star Trek:Voyager during season seven of that series. Sussman said that his story was inspired by the notion "that someone with Alzheimer's disease, in some ways, could be thought of as a time-traveler..." The Voyager producers chose not to buy Sussman's earlier pitch, which would have featured a time-crossed romance between Captain Janeway and First Officer Chakotay. Sussman ultimately sold the story to the producers of Enterprise, who said they would have preferred filming and airing the episode closer to the end of the season and the conclusion of the Xindi story arc, but had to produce it earlier as there were no scripts available to replace it.

"Twilight" was directed by Robert Duncan McNeill, his third directing credit for the series following "Cold Front" and "The Breach". McNeill had previously starred in Star Trek: Voyager as Tom Paris. McNeill was interviewed for the magazine Star Trek Monthly shortly after reading the script for "Twilight" for the first time. He explained that after reading it, he said "Holy crap how are we going to do that?" He explained that the episode would see the Enterprise destroyed but wasn't yet sure how they were going to film certain sequences such as the roof being blown off the bridge and the crew being sucked out into space.

Filming on the episode began on September 10, 2003, the same day as the airing of the season three premiere episode, "The Xindi". Production ran through to September 17. Production was suspended for a day on 8 September following the death of first assistant director Jerry Fleck over the preceding weekend. Fleck had been in pre-production for the following episode "North Star". Following the death of Fleck, the first assistant director on "Twilight", Michael DeMeritt, moved on to working on "North Star" and Arlene Fukai took over on "Twilight".

Whilst filming the episode, Bakula described it as "potentially the best script we've had and the best show to date". He found it hard to describe, saying it involved "time travel into the future, parasites in my hippocampus, and Xindi and subspace implosions". In order to represent the changes in time frames throughout the episodes, several of the cast were required to have their make-up adjusted between scenes. This included adding grey make-up to the dog actor who portrayed Archer's dog, Porthos, but the scene was cut from the final broadcast. Costume changes were made to represent promotions granted to the characters over the changes in time periods. These included Bakula who wore a wig during the later time periods shown in the episode. The wig he wore had originally been created for Gary Graham in his role as Ambassador Soval. The sets on the Enterprise were dressed to represent ongoing wear and tear.

During the shoot of the previous episode, "The Shipment", director David Straiton wore a suit and tie on the final day of shooting, something that Bakula described as being out of character. After McNeill heard about Straiton, he sought to outdo his fellow director. So instead, he arrived on the final day of shooting for "Twilight" wearing the uniform he wore as Tom Paris in Star Trek: Voyager. He hoped this would cheer the cast and crew up after a week of working on such a somber episode.

Guest stars included Gary Graham in his sixth appearance as Ambassador Soval, he filmed for one day and appeared in two scenes. Brett Rickaby made a guest appearance as Yedrin Ross. Rickaby had previously appeared in the television series Carnivàle. Richard Anthony Crenna was also credited in this episode as a security guard on board the Enterprise. "Twilight" contained references to the Star Trek: The Original Series episode "Space Seed" and the associated film Star Trek II: The Wrath of Khan. These references included the survivors of humanity settling on Ceti Alpha V, the planet that Khan Noonien Singh and his followers were exiled to in "Space Seed" and escaped from in Wrath of Khan; Sussman chose this new home world as a "cruel joke", since the planet would become all but uninhabitable within a hundred years. Reference is also made to the Mutara Nebula, where the climactic battle occurred between Captain James T. Kirk and Khan.

== Ratings ==
"Twilight" first aired on November 5, 2003 on UPN. The episode received a Nielsen rating of 2.6/4%. This means the episode was seen by 2.6 percent of all television-equipped households, and four percent of all households watching television at the time of the broadcast. This was the same rating as the following episode, "North Star." These figures placed "Twilight" sixth in the time slot based on the Nielsen ratings, and fifth in the number of viewers.

== Reception ==
Executive producer Manny Coto called "Twilight" the best episode of season 3.

"Twilight" proved to be one of the most popular episodes of the series with reviewers and with fans. As Enterprise was nearing the end of its first-run airings on UPN, the episode was chosen as the "#1 Fan Favorite Episode" in a Viewer's Choice poll at UPN.com, and rebroadcast in that context on April 8, 2005. In November of that year, readers of Star Trek Magazine selected the episode as one of the Top Five episodes of the series.

Jamahl Epsicokhan on his website Jammer's Reviews wrote, "if I were a cynic I might say that I've already seen elsewhere most of what 'Twilight' has to offer." He wrote that the episode's dark alternate future bore similarities to the Star Trek: The Next Generation episode "Yesterday's Enterprise", and that Archer's memory issues were analogous to those in the film Memento. Epsicokhan also suggested that the flashback sequences were similar to the Star Trek: Deep Space Nine episode "The Visitor", but was a "substantially less poignant take on hypothetical material". Nevertheless, he said that the episode "repackages the material well, plausibly ties it into the current Enterprise story arc," and has "something for everyone," with an "apocalyptic" action storyline tied in to an "intimate character story that works in its own right." He gave the episode a score of three and a half out of four. Reviewer James Michael Kozak on Ain't It Cool News, aka "Hercules Strong," said that the storyline "cribs shamelessly" from a number of episodes in the Star Trek franchise, including the Voyager installments "Year of Hell" and "Endgame", as well as The Next Generation's "Yesterday's Enterprise" and "All Good Things...", but added that "this [episode] remained just different enough for me to kind of love it." Kozak wrote that the episode presented the viewer "a very real sense of what is at stake in this bizarre conflict with the Xindi" for the first time, and that he was "moved" by the evolution of T'Pol's relationship with Archer. He gave the episode four out of five stars. Critic "Ex Deus" at TrekWeb.com gave the episode 9.5 out of 10 stars, saying "Scott Bakula gives one of his best performances as Archer.

The Star Trek 101 guidebook named "Twilight" as one of the "Ten Essential Episodes" from Star Trek: Enterprise. The Digital Fix said this was the best episode in season 3. Blogger J.P. Halt at his website Random Musings rated the episode 10/10, writing, "Mike Sussman, who is arguably the show's best writer, has crafted a very smart script." Halt added: "Overall, this is probably the best 'reset button' episode the Trek franchise ever crafted. It's one of a very small handful of outstanding Enterprise episodes, and a contender for the series' best."

The Washington Post noted that "Twilight" was Enterprise's "highest rated episode" in their analysis of ratings from the Internet Movie Database. Critic Stephanie V.W. Lucianovic at Television Without Pity, aka "Keckler," said that the episode will "get your Heart of Khan pumping with righteous Trekkie excitement," adding that the producers have "come up with something amazing that is completely, unabashedly, and unreservedly worthy of high praise." She gave the episode a grade of A+. io9 ranked "Twilight" as the 33rd best episode of Star Trek, out of the more than 700 made by that time.

Writer Darren Mooney at The M0vie Blog.com says that "'Twilight' is a surprisingly affecting love story, one that uses a science-fiction premise to capture a very human situation." He added that, "Mike Sussman is a writer with a very clear fascination and engagement with continuity and consistency... ['Twilight'] is a beautiful and thoughtful piece of Star Trek, an absolute triumph." WhatCulture ranked it as one of the "30 Best Star Trek Episodes Of All Time," saying that, "like many great episodes of Trek in the past, 'Twilight' had something interesting to talk about and did it exceptionally well... doing it within the confines of a mesmerizing character piece between Archer and T'Pol."

Matthew Kresal at WarpedFactor.com wrote, "Mike Sussman's script for 'Twilight' is an intriguing piece of work." He adds, "It's also a turning point for Enterprise as a whole and was the first sign of what the series might be capable of. On its own it stands out as one of Star Trek best alternate timeline episodes and rightfully so."

== Home media release ==
The first home media release of "Twilight" was as part of the season three DVD box set, released in the United States on September 27, 2005. It subsequently became one of three Enterprise episodes to be included in the Star Trek: Alternative Realities Collective DVD set which was released in 2009. The other episodes were "E²" and "In a Mirror, Darkly", and also featured were other mirror universe installments including "Mirror, Mirror" and three of those from Deep Space Nine. The Blu-ray release of the third season of Enterprise took place on January 7, 2014. The Blu-Ray has a surround sound 5.1 DTS-HD Master Audio track for English, as well as German, French, and Japanese audio tracks in Dolby audio.

== Music ==
Jay Chattaway's music for the episode was released as part of the four disc Star Trek: Enterprise Collection on December 2, 2014, including the orchestral pieces:

1-16	Armageddon	1:38
1-17	Rip Van Winkle / Angst	2:03
1-18	Showdown / Back To The Past	6:55
