= The Shipment (Star Trek: Enterprise) =

- Star Trek: Enterprise episode
- Episode no.: Season 3 Episode 7
- Directed by: David Straiton
- Written by: Chris Black; Brent V. Friedman
- Production code: 307
- Original air date: October 29, 2003

Guest appearances
- John Cothran, Jr. - Gralik Durr; Randy Oglesby - Degra; Steven Culp - Major Hayes; John Eddins - Xindi-Reptilian; Jack Alsted - Sloth #2; Sam Witwer - Sloth #3

Episode chronology
← Previous "Exile"	Next → "Twilight"
- Star Trek: Enterprise season 3

"The Shipment" is the fifty-ninth episode of the American science fiction television series Star Trek: Enterprise, the seventh episode of season three. It first aired on October 29, 2003 on UPN in the United States. The episode was written by Chris Black and Brent V. Friedman. It was directed by David Straiton, his sixth episode of the series at that point.

Set in the 22nd century, the series follows the adventures of the first Starfleet starship Enterprise, registration NX-01. In this episode, the crew follow a trail of information to a mining complex which is producing a compound used in the construction of a Xindi weapon, while Chief Engineer Charles "Trip" Tucker (Connor Trinneer) makes a discovery about the Xindi sidearms.

The episode was filmed in late August and early September at the same time as the season premier was first aired. It used a combination of standing sets along with a handful of new sets to represent locations on the Xindi planet. Two actors resumed their roles from earlier in the season; John Cothran, Jr. had previously appeared as a Klingon in both Star Trek: The Next Generation and Deep Space Nine. Reviews were mostly positive for "The Shipment", and it received a 3.9/6 rating, which was an increase from the re-run shown the previous week but was not as high as the following episode.

== Plot ==
At the Xindi Council, Degra reports that the weapon to destroy Earth should be ready in a matter of weeks. The coordinates provided by Tarquin (in "Exile") lead the Enterprise to a planet, and the crew decide to hide the ship behind a moon while a shuttlepod crewed by Captain Archer, Lieutenant Reed and Major Hayes approaches it. Evading detection, they land and enter a Xindi settlement, where they find a great quantity of kemocite being refined. They then observe Gralik Durr and two associates discussing the deal they have to mine the kemocite for Degra. The away team beams up a canister of kemocite for analysis, and then follow Gralik back to his home, where they confront him.

T'Pol's analysis shows that the Xindi probe which attacked Earth (in "The Expanse") contained kemocite. Archer then tells Gralik that Degra will use the kemocite to build a weapon, but the Arboreal denies any knowledge of the plan, saying he never asked what the kemocite was for. Back on Enterprise, Commander Tucker also learns that the kemocite is also the key to Reptilian rifle technology. Archer approves his idea to reverse engineer a rifle, but Tucker unknowingly triggers a self-destruct sequence and the weapon is beamed into space, where it explodes.

On the planet, Archer decides not to destroy the kemocite mining complex as he does not want the Xindi civilians to think of them as aggressors. Gralik explains that Degra told him the kemocite was for research, and explains how the Avians (a sixth Xindi race) were assumed to be made extinct in the Xindi Civil War which ended in the destruction of the Xindi homeworld (the debris field in "The Xindi"). A Reptilian shuttle arrives early, carrying Degra, to collect the final shipment of kemocite. Gralik takes the away team to a cave that will protect them from scans, but they are soon discovered by robotic drones sent by the Reptilians. When Gralik returns home, he is confronted by Degra, who reveals the true purpose of the kemocite, to build a weapon to destroy a "ruthless alien species". T'Pol, in the meantime, has modified the canister of kemocite so that the ship can track it. Archer manages to sneak it aboard the Xindi shuttle and after the Reptilians leave, Archer thanks Gralik for his trust and help.

== Production ==
Filming of the episode started on August 29, 2003, overlapping with the final day of the shoot for the episode "Exile". As the final scenes to be shot for "Exile" only required Linda Park from the main cast, the remaining cast were freed up to shoot scenes for "The Shipment". The first scenes to be filmed were those concerning the subplot of the episode where Tucker attempts to take apart the Xindi rifle. Filming resumed on the day after Labor Day with all of the main cast involved. Most of the sets used were the Enterprise standing sets, but additional sets were required to represent Gralik's home, the Xindi complex and a forest and cave area. During the shoot, live footage was shot of the sets and was presented by Scott Bakula for Good Day Live in order to promote the series three premier "The Xindi", which aired that evening.

It was the second episode of the season for director David Straiton after the second episode, "Anomaly", and his sixth episode of the series overall. Chris Black and Brent Friedman wrote the episode together. They were both producers on the show; Black a co-executive producer and Friedman a consulting producer. They had each written episodes of the series separately with Friedman credited for "Rajiin". Black has several credits to his name on the show, including "First Flight" and "Carbon Creek". The episode saw the return of John Cothran Jr., who had previously played two Klingons in previously Star Trek series. These were Nu'Daq in The Next Generation episode "The Chase" and Telok in the Deep Space Nine episode "Crossover". Other cast returning from earlier in the season were Steven Culp as Major Hayes and Randy Oglesby as the Xindi Degra. Executive producer Rick Berman later announced that Gralik would be returning to Enterprise, however "The Shipment" was the only on screen appearance of the character.

== Reception ==
"The Shipment" was first aired in the United States on the UPN network on October 29, 2003. It received a 3.9/6 share among all adults, with 6 percent of all adults watching television at the time of the broadcast. It was in sixth place for the night, one place behind Smallville on The WB which had a 4.2/7 rating. It was an increase from the 2.6 rating in the previous week for a re-run episode aired up against a Major League Baseball World Series game on the Fox Network. The following week was sweeps week, and saw an increase in viewers for the episode "Twilight" up to a rating of 4.07, an increase of nearly 400,000 viewers compared to "The Shipment".

Michelle Erica Green, reviewing the episode for TrekNation, described the episode as "very classic Trek". She was pleased to see that some character depth was being introduced into the new Xindi characters, and compared Gralik to Captain Dathon from the Star Trek: The Next Generation episode "Darmok" but thought that Gralik didn't get developed quite enough to be on the same level. Overall, she described the episode as "a very solid hour of entertainment, with very few nitpicks... a slick package with the values I consider to be real Trek". Jamahl Epsicokhan at his website Jammer's Reviews wasn't enthusiastic about a particularly "lackluster" action scene which he felt was a bad cross between Star Trek: Insurrection and Andromeda. However, he was pleased with the other aspects of the plot and praised the clever scripting. He gave the episode a score of three out of four.

The Digital Fix said this one of the interesting episodes that are part of the Xindi story arc, and noted it for having a moral dilemma.

== Home media release ==
The only home media release of "The Shipment" has been as part of the season three DVD box set, released in the United States on September 27, 2005. The Blu-ray release of Enterprise was announced in early 2013, and released on January 7, 2014.
