= North Star (Star Trek: Enterprise) =

Season-three episode

- Star Trek: Enterprise episode
- Episode no.: Season 3 Episode 9
- Directed by: David Straiton
- Written by: David A. Goodman
- Production code: 309
- Original air date: November 12, 2003

Guest appearances
- Emily Bergl as Bethany; Glenn Morshower as MacReady; James Parks as Deputy Bennings

Episode chronology
← Previous "Twilight"	Next → "Similitude"
- Star Trek: Enterprise season 3

"North Star" is the 61st episode of the American science fiction television series Star Trek: Enterprise, the ninth episode of the third season. It first aired on November 12, 2003, on UPN. It was written by David A. Goodman and directed by David Straiton.

Set in the 22nd century, the series follows the adventures of the first Starfleet starship Enterprise, registration NX-01. In this episode, the crew of the Enterprise discover a lost colony of humans in the Delphic Expanse. The colony originated from a wagon train from the American Old West in the 1860s which was abducted as slave labor by an alien race called the Skagarans. The humans overthrew the Skagarans and now treat them as second-class citizens.

Goodman wrote the episode after he was set a challenge by executive producer Rick Berman, and wrote in references to the 1940 film Santa Fe Trail and The Original Series episode "Spectre of the Gun". The episode was mostly filmed on the Western town set nicknamed "Six Points Texas" at the Universal Studios lot. Critical response to the episode was mixed, but the ratings held steady from the previous episode with a 2.6/4% share.

== Plot ==
While in the Delphic Expanse, Enterprise discovers a planet inhabited by about 6,000 humans who are living in the fashion of the 1860s American frontier alongside an alien race called Skagarans. Captain Archer, Commander Tucker and Sub-Commander T'Pol beam-down to the surface in period costume to investigate. They head into one of the numerous towns to observe the humans and aliens first-hand, and while Tucker and T'Pol acquire a horse, Archer stops Deputy Bennings from belittling a "Skag" waiter in the town's tavern. After questioning Archer on his plans and intentions, Sheriff MacReady tells Bennings to keep a close eye on Archer.

Archer, wishing to learn more about the Skagarans, enters the house of a teacher named Bethany he had seen earlier. The two depart for "Skag Town", the remnants of a 300-year-old wrecked spacecraft, but the deputy notices them leave. They arrive and meet Tucker and T'Pol, who had arrived earlier. Tucker and T'Pol travel back to Enterprise to investigate some data logs found in the wreckage, while Archer stays behind. On Enterprise Ensign Sato discovers that the humans overthrew their Skagaran masters after being abducted from Earth by them and brought to the planet centuries earlier. Bennings arrests and imprisons Bethany for teaching the Skagaran children. Archer helps her to escape, but she is shot by Bennings. Archer orders an emergency beam-up in front of Bennings and other locals.

Doctor Phlox treats her injury and discovers that she is one-quarter Skagaran. Meanwhile, back on the planet, Bennings is convinced that Archer, even though he is Human, is conspiring with the Skagarans to regain control of the colony. He tells MacReady that the only solution is to murder the Skagarans, for which MacReady, unconvinced, rebukes him. Bennings hands in his deputy badge after MacReady orders him not to take further action against the Skagarans. Archer returns in a shuttlepod along with T'Pol and a security crew, led by Lieutenant Reed — all wearing their modern uniforms. Landing in the center of town, he informs the Sheriff that he is from Earth and will return to take them back to Earth once their mission is over. Bennings then shoots MacReady, starting a firefight. In the chaos, Archer is also shot by Bennings, but finally overpowers him in a fistfight. Enterprise then departs, but not before returning Bethany to the surface, and providing her with a PADD to educate the local children about Earth's recent history. MacReady agrees that the laws against the Skagarans are outdated, and he allows Human and Skagaran children to learn together.

== Production ==
"North Star" was the season's third episode directed by David Straiton, while writer David A. Goodman had previously written the episodes "Judgment" and "Precious Cargo". (He also wrote the Star Trek themed Futurama episode "Where No Fan Has Gone Before".) Goodman explained that he was inspired by The Original Series episodes "A Piece of the Action" and "Patterns of Force" after executive producer Rick Berman set him the challenge of writing a "parallel Earth" story similar to those featured in TOS but that would fit with Enterprise. These types of stories, where humans had evolved societies on other planets similar to our own, featured in Gene Roddenberry's original pitch for Star Trek to NBC.

Goodman also added a reference to The Original Series episode "Spectre of the Gun" with the naming of the character Cronin, but said that Kitty was named after a character in the film Santa Fe Trail (1940) rather than the radio/television series Gunsmoke. He later described "North Star" as his favorite episode of the series. It was the third Western-themed Star Trek episode after "Spectre of the Gun" and The Next Generation episode "A Fistful of Datas". This episode included a number of guest cast members: Emily Bergl (Bethany) previously appeared in the miniseries Taken. Glenn Morshower (Sheriff MacReady) previously appeared in episodes of The Next Generation and Voyager. James Parks (Deputy Bennings) also appeared in Voyager.

It was the first episode filmed on location during season three, but the production only moved from the Paramount Studios lot to the Universal Studios back lot where the Western town set "Six Points Texas" was used. The shoot there started on the second day of filming, over a five-day period, and used a number of sets including the main street, livery stable, saloon and schoolhouse. The sets have been in more movies than any others in the world; the livery stable, in particular, was in the film My Little Chickadee (1940). A shuttlepod set-piece was brought over from Paramount Studios. This location was seen previously in the STAR TREK The Next Generation episode, A Fistful Of Datas(S6E08) filmed in 1992.

Twelve horses were used, and stunt doubles replaced main cast members whose characters were depicted riding. The episode included a number of stunts, supervised by Vince Deadrick Jr. Scenes using the standing sets at Paramount were filmed on the first and last days of shooting, which overlapped with the first day of shooting of the following episode, "Similitude".

The DVD includes the first below-the-line commentary track in Star Trek history, featuring first assistant director Michael DeMeritt. Among many details it includes provided is how the overall sepia look was achieved by director of photography Marvin Rush, a process of the physical film age called bleach bypass.

First Assistant Director (AD) Jerry Fleck died during preparations for "North Star". He joined season six of Star Trek: The Next Generation and was with the Star Trek franchise for eleven years. Production was shut down on September 15 out of respect, and the episode "Extinction" was dedicated to his memory.

== Reception ==
"North Star" was first aired on November 12, 2003, on UPN. It received a 2.6/4% share among adults between the ages of 18 and 49. This means that it was seen by 2.6 percent of all 18- to 49-year-olds, and 4 percent of all 18- to 49-year-olds watching television at the time of the broadcast. This was the same as the ratings received by the previous episode entitled "Twilight," but showed a loss of 200,000 viewers overall. "North Star" received lower ratings than the following episode "Similitude," which received a ratings share of 3.0/5%.

Michelle Erica Green, writing at TrekNation in 2003, said that she was expecting something similar to The Original Series episode "Spectre of the Gun", but was pleased to find it was more similar to Voyager's "The 37's." She said that, "because the episode is stylish and beautifully paced, the morality play doesn't get too heavy-handed or silly," but felt that it was one-sided because of the lack of information on the Skagarans. She summed up the "North Star" by describing it as a "fun, throw away" episode. Jamahl Epsicokhan on his website Jammer's Reviews described it as a "shallow Trek adventure by the numbers" which was "all about setting and rarely about substance." He gave it a score of two out of four. Epsicokhan, summing up the whole of season three, described "North Star" as one of the mediocre episodes in the season.

Shannon Nutt wrote in a 2014 review in High Def Digest that "North Star" was one of her two favorite episodes of the third season of Enterprise, but also acknowledged that her stance was not common and that most fans disliked the episode.

Keith R. A. DeCandido wrote a retrospective in 2023 that considered the episode one of the absolute worst episodes of Enterprise created. He gave "North Star" a 1/10 ranking. DeCandido thought the episode was a "bog-standard Western story", but did grant that guest stars Emily Bergl and Glenn Morshower put in good performances.

== Home media release ==
"North Star" was released as part of the season three DVD box set, released in the United States on September 27, 2005. The season was released on Blu-ray in the United States on January 7, 2014.

Jay Chattaway's music for the episode was released as part of the four disc Star Trek: Enterprise Collection on December 2, 2014, including the orchestral piece "Hangin' Offense".

== See also ==
- "The 37's" – a second season episode of Star Trek: Voyager based on the same premise of humans abducted from Earth by aliens for slave labor and then revolting in a take-over.
- Stargate (Humans taken in the past by aliens is also a foundational premise of the Stargate sci-fiverse)
