= Embers (2015 film) =

- Directed by: Claire Carré
- Written by: Charles Spano; Claire Carré
- Produced by: Charles Spano; Claire Carré
- Starring: Jason Ritter; Iva Gocheva
- Cinematography: Todd Antonio Somodevilla
- Edited by: Claire Carré
- Music by: Kimberly Henninger; Shawn Parke
- Production companies: Chaotic Good; Papaya Films; Bunker Features
- Release date: September 18, 2015 (Oldenburg Film Festival)
- Running time: 85 minutes
- Language: English

Embers is a 2015 American independent science fiction film directed by Claire Carré as her feature debut, and written and produced by Claire Carré and Charles Spano. It features Jason Ritter, Iva Gocheva, Greta Fernández, Tucker Smallwood, Karl Glusman, and Silvan Friedman.

The film world premiered at Oldenburg International Film Festival and US co-premiered at the Chicago International Film Festival and New Orleans Film Festival where it won Best Feature. Embers was selected as Closing Night Film at Slamdance Film Festival. Slamdance Presents acquired theatrical rights and The Orchard acquired global digital distribution rights to the film, releasing it in 2016.

== Plot ==
Embers tells the story of those who, a decade after a global epidemic, remain and suffer from lasting effects of the virus - retrograde and anterograde amnesia. The survivors navigate a decaying landscape, unable to recall the past or create new memories. Five interwoven stories each explore a different facet of life without memory in a future that has no past.

== Cast ==
- Jason Ritter as Guy
- Iva Gocheva as Girl
- Greta Fernández as Miranda
- Tucker Smallwood as Teacher
- Karl Glusman as Chaos
- Roberto Cots as Father
- Dominique Swain as Woman in the Long Dress
- Matthew Goulish as Guardian
- Silvan Ftiedman as Boy
- Sundance as Horse

== Reception ==
=== Critical response ===
Embers received positive reviews in The Hollywood Reporter, Los Angeles Times, and L.A. Weekly. On the review aggregator website Rotten Tomatoes, 83% of 23 critics' reviews are positive. Metacritic, which uses a weighted average, assigned the film a score of 55 out of 100, based on 4 critics, indicating "mixed or average" reviews.

Eric Kohn of IndieWire dubbed Embers, "the best science fiction discovery of the year," and Don Simpson writing for Smells Like Screen Spirit called Embers, "one of the most memorable independent science fiction films in the last decade.” Sight & Sound's Anton Bitel lauded the direction, saying, "Carré weaves from her ensemble amnesi-apocalypse a reflection of the human condition as philosophically compelling as it is emotionally intelligent." The Italian film journal Cine Lapsus described the film as, "Beckett absurdly suspended halfway between Memento and City Lights.” Variety criticized Embers, saying it "could be described as a mass-scale Memento, but that thumbnail sketch misses both the pic's impressive conceptual breadth and its numbing dramatic stasis."

=== Accolades ===
Director Claire Carré received nominations for the Someone to Watch Award at the 2017 Independent Spirit Awards and the Spotlight On Women Directors Award at the Gotham Awards. Embers was nominated for Best Production Design for Chelsea Oliver at the inaugural American Independent Film Awards.

Embers received numerous festival accolades including Best Feature at New Orleans Film Festival, SciFi London, Feratum Film Festival, and Oxford Film Festival, where Carré also was given the Alice Guy-Blaché Award. At Newport Beach Film Festival, Embers won both Best Feature and Best Director, and the film received awards for Best Feature and Best Editing at Buenos Aires Rojo Sangre Film Festival. Embers also received Best New Director at Brooklyn Film Festival, and both the Juice Award and Special Jury Prize at Sarasota Film Festival. Trieste Science+Fiction Festival in Italy awarded Embers the prestigious Asteroide.
