= Disney Castle =

Disney Castle is a generic name for the castles at the center of several Disney theme parks. It may refer to:

== Disney theme park locations ==
- Sleeping Beauty Castle at Disneyland and formerly at Hong Kong Disneyland
- Cinderella Castle at Magic Kingdom and Tokyo Disneyland
- Le Château de la Belle au Bois Dormant at Disneyland Park (Paris)
- Enchanted Storybook Castle at Shanghai Disneyland
- Castle of Magical Dreams at Hong Kong Disneyland

== Other uses ==
- The Walt Disney Pictures logo
- Disney Castle, a location in Kingdom Hearts
