= Jerry Fleck =

American assistant director (1947–2003)

- Born: November 4, 1947; Chicago, Illinois, U.S.
- Died: September 14, 2003 (aged 55); Saugus, Santa Clarita, California, U.S.
- Occupation: Assistant director

Gerald R. Fleck (November 4, 1947 – September 14, 2003) was an American assistant director best known for his work on the Star Trek franchise across eleven years.

== Early life ==
Fleck was born in Chicago, Illinois, to Ed and Joan Fleck. The family moved to Santa Barbara, California, in 1955. During his school years, Jerry became student government president and within the Boy Scouts of America, he became an Eagle Scout. He performed in school productions, and later joined the Santa Barbara Youth Theater. While at Santa Barbara City College, he won a scholarship to attend the American Academy of Dramatic Art in New York City. Jerry graduated from California State Long Beach with a BA in Theater Arts and production. He was in the same graduating class as Steven Spielberg.

== Career ==
After graduation, Fleck appeared in several theatrical productions while doing dinner theater where he performed across America. He joined the production team of Sunn Classic Pictures, working on series such as The Life and Times of Grizzly Adams. On that show, he worked with James L. Conway, with whom he would later work on the pilot of Star Trek: Enterprise, "Broken Bow". As an assistant director, he worked on other production companies' television series such as Hardcastle and McCormick, The A-Team and Hunter, and on feature films including Tim Burton's Edward Scissorhands and Beetlejuice. He joined Star Trek: The Next Generation as first assistant director, marking the start of eleven and a half years with the franchise. He continued his work with the series Star Trek: Voyager and Enterprise, and the Jonathan Frakes-directed films Star Trek: First Contact and Star Trek: Insurrection.

== Death ==
Fleck died of a heart attack at his home on September 14, 2003. He was working on pre-production for the Enterprise episode "North Star". Once news broke, production was shut down on Enterprise on September 15 out of respect. The episode "Extinction", which aired 10 days after his death, was dedicated to his memory. Scott Bakula said "It was a terrible, sad day for everyone involved with Star Trek. Jerry was, in many ways, the heart and soul of the entire team, and he will be always remembered, and greatly missed." Jerry is survived by his daughter, Emily Fleck, of Ojai, California; his stepson, Simon Stotler, of Portland, Oregon; his wife, Katy Fleck; his sister JoAnne Michels of Boise Idaho, and his brother, Michael Fleck, of Waiheke Island, New Zealand.
