= Impulse (Star Trek: Enterprise) =

- Star Trek: Enterprise episode
- Episode no.: Season 3 Episode 5
- Directed by: David Livingston
- Story by: Jonathan Fernandez; Terry Matalas
- Teleplay by: Jonathan Fernandez
- Cinematography by: Marvin V. Rush
- Production code: 305
- Original air date: October 8, 2003

Guest appearance
- Sean McGowan - Corporal Hawkins

Episode chronology
← Previous "Rajiin"	Next → "Exile"
- Star Trek: Enterprise season 3

"Impulse" is the fifty-seventh episode of the American science fiction television series Star Trek: Enterprise, the fifth episode of season three. The episode was written by story editor Jonathan Fernandez from a story by Fernandez and Terry Matalas. It first aired October 8, 2003 on UPN in the United States. The episode was described by Paramount Pictures as "as close to a horror show as Star Trek gets".

Set in the 22nd century, the series follows the adventures of the first Starfleet starship Enterprise, registration NX-01. In this episode, while investigating the Delphic Expanse for a Xindi superweapon, the Enterprise responds to the distress call of a Vulcan ship.

== Plot ==
Captain Archer carries Sub-Commander T'Pol into sickbay, where he and Doctor Phlox strap her to a bed. She awakes and threatens to kill Archer, and Phlox sedates her. A day earlier, Enterprise received a distress call from the Vulcan cruiser Seleya, and found the ship adrift in an asteroid belt rich in Trellium ore. Archer decides to send in a shuttlepod as Enterprise is too big to maneuver among the asteroids. En route, T'Pol informs the other members of the away team that the Vaankara had been sent into the Expanse to find the Seleya, but the crew began to attack one another and the ship was destroyed. Meanwhile, Commander Tucker and Ensign Mayweather decide to mine some Trellium ore from an asteroid.

Lieutenant Reed, T'Pol and Archer board the Seleya and are attacked by zombie-like Vulcans. Soon T'Pol begins to show the same effects as seen in the other Vulcans. Archer and the away team fight their way to the Seleya's Engineering section, where they attempt to re-route the bulkhead controls on the ship so they can get back to their shuttle. They discuss a general override, which would unlock the bulkheads, but also shut down the containment on the warp core, and T'Pol accuses Archer of wanting to kill all the Vulcans.

Tucker and Mayweather retrieve the ore, but their shuttlepod is damaged in the process. After they return to Enterprise they begin repairs. Meanwhile, the Vulcan crew begins to gas Engineering, forcing Reed to activate the override. Archer's away team head back to the shuttle and arrive moments before the Seleya is due to explode, but find the docking clamps locked. Tucker and Mayweather then arrive on the second shuttle and shoot out the clamps and the two shuttles depart, as the Seleya is destroyed.

Back on the Enterprise, Phlox treats T'Pol's symptoms, stating that Trellium is a lethal neurotoxin for Vulcans, but while the crew of the Seleya was beyond saving, T'Pol will slowly recover, having only briefly been exposed. Tucker announces enough ore was recovered to shield the forward hull, but Archer notes that it will harm T'Pol, and orders it stored in a bio-hazard locker until a cure can be created.

== Production ==
The story was by Jonathan Fernandez and Terry Matalas, and Fernandez also wrote the script. David Livingston directed a total of 62 episodes of Star Trek, including 15 episodes of Enterprise. "Impulse" was from a directing and visual standpoint, his favorite episode of the work he did on Enterprise. Everyone in all departments, especially director of photography Marvin Rush, understood that they were making a zombie movie, "so let's do a zombie movie." Livingston explained that when filming, he tended to shoot fast and that, relative to page count, he would inevitably come up short and have to shoot additional footage with the second unit to make the episode long enough. In this case, Livingston sketched out a sequence shot-by-shot for the end of the episode, which the producers accepted. This became T'Pol's nightmare, and he believed it integrated well into the episode and did not feel like it was added on. Livingston was very pleased with how the final episode turned out and said he wouldn't change anything. Blalock said she loved the episode.

== Reception ==
"Impulse" was first aired in the United States on UPN on October 8, 2003. It received a 2.8/4 percent share among adults. This means that it was seen by 2.8 percent of all households, and 4 percent of all of those watching television at the time of the broadcast. Enterprise was the sixth most watched program in the time-slot, behind Smallville on The WB. It was estimated that "Impulse" was watched by 4.17 million viewers, which was less than the previous episode, "Rajiin".

Michelle Erica Green of TrekNation was prepared for the worst based on the previews for this episode, but said it "is actually a well-done haunted ship story". She noted that the "script could have seemed really hackneyed were the visuals and the emotional focus not so perfectly controlled", and praised "a spot-on performance by Jolene Blalock and superb directing by David Livingston." Jamahl Epsicokhan at his website Jammer's Reviews described the episode as "sort of a guilty pleasure" due to the "superficial visual qualities", but said that it lacked substance. He gave "Impulse" a rating of three out of four. Television Without Pity gave the episode a grade A−.

H&I noted this as an episode of Star Trek featuring scary or eerie content, and said "this is about as straight-up horror as Star Trek gets." TheGamer ranked this one of the top 25 creepiest episodes of all Star Trek series. Den of Geek ranked this episode as the 7th most scary episode of all Star Trek franchise television episodes. ScreenRant ranked "Impulse" the 5th scariest episode of all Star Trek franchise episodes up to that time.

== Home media releases ==
"Impulse" was released as part of the season three DVD box set, released in the United States on September 27, 2005. The set included optional text commentary for "Impulse" from Mike and Denise Okuda. The season was released on Blu-ray in the United States on January 7, 2014.
