= Anomaly (Star Trek: Enterprise) =

- Star Trek: Enterprise episode
- Episode no.: Season 3 Episode 2
- Directed by: David Straiton
- Written by: Mike Sussman
- Production code: 302
- Original air date: September 17, 2003

Guest appearances
- Robert Rusler - Orgoth; Nathan Anderson - Sergeant Kemper; Julia Rose - Corporal McKenzie; Sean McGowan - Corporal Hawkins; Ken Lally - Lt. Taylor

Episode chronology
← Previous "The Xindi"	Next → "Extinction"
- Star Trek: Enterprise season 3

"Anomaly" is the 54th episode of the American science fiction television series Star Trek: Enterprise, the second episode of the third season. The episode was written by co-producer Mike Sussman and directed by David Straiton, his fifth for the show. The episode aired on UPN on September 17, 2003.

Set in the 22nd century, the series follows the adventures of the first Starfleet starship Enterprise, registration NX-01. Season three of Enterprise features an ongoing story following an attack on Earth by previously unknown aliens called the Xindi. In this episode, the Enterprise is attacked by an Osaarian vessel, and in pursuit they discover that the aliens have information on the Xindi which they must retrieve to help them on their mission.

The guest cast included Robert Rusler, who had previously appeared in Babylon 5, and Julia Rose, who wore a costume originally created for Hilary Swank in the 2003 film The Core. The episode received ratings of 2.6/5 percent according to Nielsen Media Research, which was the same as previous episode "The Xindi". It was watched by 4.29 million viewers which was an increase and the fourth highest so far in 2003. The actions of Captain Jonathan Archer (Scott Bakula) received criticism in this episode, but the special effects and action sequences were praised.

== Plot ==
As Enterprise continues to travel through the Delphic Expanse, the ship is damaged by destructive spatial anomalies. With most of the primary systems off-line, Ensign Mayweather notices another ship nearby but no life-signs are detected. Captain Archer leads Lieutenant Reed and several MACOs on an away mission, and discover the crew are all dead. Taking what they can, they return and resume their mission.

Soon another vessel approaches Enterprise, and a group of aliens beam on board, stealing weapons, food and equipment. The crew finally prevails, and one of the aliens, an Osaarian called Orgoth, is captured. Archer hopes to recover the stolen items, but the Osaarians have masked their ion trail. He then confronts Orgoth in the brig. He explains they were traders attempting to find new trade routes, but after being hit by the spatial anomalies they were unable to leave and resorted to piracy.

The crew are able to track the Osaarian vessel, finding a large 1,000-year-old sphere constructed out of a single alloy that the pirates are using as a hideout. Archer and his away team discover a series of habitat modules containing most of the stolen items. The crew also finds a cargo manifest, and Ensign Sato soon learns they had also recently attacked a Xindi ship. Archer once again confronts Orgoth, demanding to know everything about the Xindi. To make him talk, he drags the Osaarian to an airlock, initiating the decompression cycle. Orgoth reveals that they downloaded the Xindi database, and provides the access codes to their computer. When the alien ship returns, Mayweather maneuvers Enterprise close enough for Sato to download 90% of the database. Archer sends Orgoth back to his people.

== Production ==
Writer and co-producer Mike Sussman, who wrote the script of the episode, originally intending for it to show the origins of the Orion species, but this was changed to a new species, the Osaarians, during rewrites. Sussman said it was a difficult script to write and even though he was officially the sole credited writer, that "Brannon [Braga] easily wrote half of it" and in particular gave credit to Braga for the confrontation in the airlock, which he thought was the best scene in the episode. The episode was shot over seven days, with the majority of filming taking place on standing ship sets for the Enterprise. The Command Centre set was used for the second time, having previously appeared in the first episode of the season. It had been introduced as a new set for the third season as an area on the Enterprise where the crew would plan their next move in the mission against the Xindi. A new set was created for the brig, where the Osaarian Orgoth was held prisoner. One day of filming was on sets to represent the Osaarian base, with the majority of those made up using green screens that would allow the sets to be digitally inserted in post production.

Julia Rose made her debut as MACO Corporal McKenzie, having beaten between 25 and 40 other actors to get the part. The spacesuit costume that she wore in the episode was reused, having been created originally for the 2003 Paramount Pictures film The Core where it was worn by Hilary Swank. Rose had been a fan of Bakula from his time on Quantum Leap and described him as the "Dad" on set. Nathan Anderson appeared as Sergeant Kemper for the second time. Robert Rusler, who appeared as Orgoth, had previously been in the second season of Babylon 5 as Warren Keffer. "Anomaly" was the fifth episode to be directed by David Straiton.

== Reception ==
"Anomaly" was first aired in the United States on UPN on September 17, 2003. According to Nielsen Media Research, it received a 2.6/5 percent share among adults. This means that it was seen by 2.6 percent of all households, and 5 percent of all of those watching television at the time of the broadcast. It was estimated that "Anomaly" was watched by 4.29 million viewers, which was the highest since "Future Tense" in February 2003 was watched by 4.62 million and the fourth highest of 2003 so far.

Michelle Erica Green of TrekNation, compared the actions of Archer in this episode to those of Kathryn Janeway in the second part of the Star Trek: Voyager episode "Equinox", but felt that here it came across as "callous and horrific". She felt that Archer's actions were typical of a "Hollywood fantasy (or nightmare) post-9/11 leader" but thought that they were realistic. She also praised other elements such as the special effects such as the derelict ship, calling it "creepy, vivid, [and] entirely believable." Jamahl Epsicokhan at his website Jammer's Reviews, called the episode "proof that action-centric Trek can indeed work, and work well." He thought it was a vast improvement on the previous episode and found the stronger version of Archer interesting. He praised the soundtrack by Jay Chattaway which he felt suggested that the typical Star Trek music was being revised. He gave the episode a score of three and a half out of four.

== Home media release ==
The first home media release of "Anomaly" was as part of the season three DVD box set, released in the United States on September 27, 2005. The Blu-ray release of the third season of Enterprise took place on January 7, 2014.
