= Tucker Smallwood =

American actor, author (born 1944)

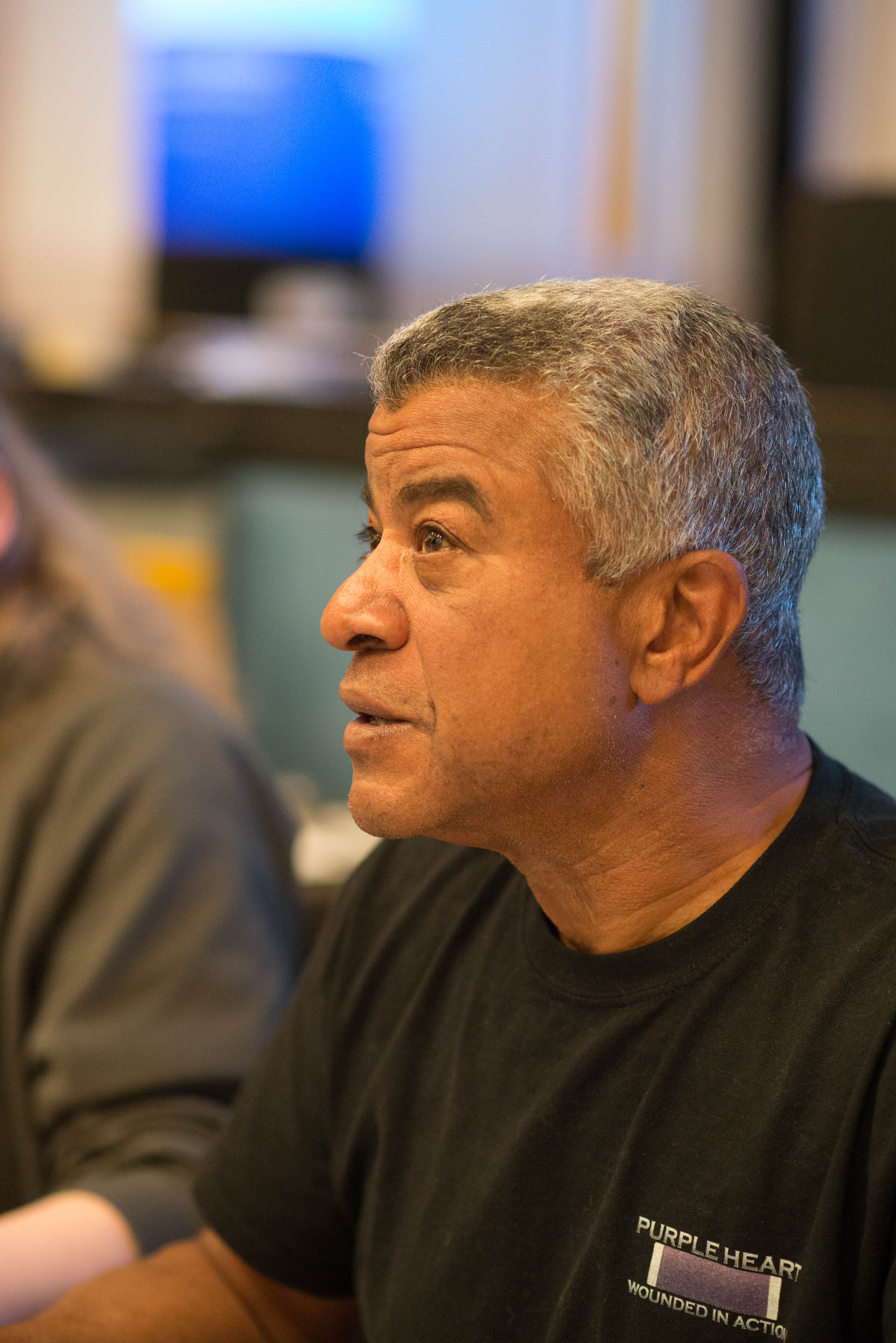
- Smallwood at Fedcon 25 in May 2016
- Born: February 22, 1944 (age 82); Washington, D.C., U.S.
- Occupations: Actor, author
- Military career
- Allegiance: United States
- Branch: United States Army
- Conflicts: Vietnam War (WIA)
- Awards: Purple Heart

Tucker Smallwood (born February 22, 1944) is an American actor, author, and vocalist.

== Early life ==
From 1967 to 1970, Smallwood, who is of African American heritage, served as a lieutenant in the U.S. Army's Airborne Infantry. Commanding a Mobile Advisory Team during the Vietnam War, he was critically wounded in action and pronounced dead, in 1969, but survived. After recovering from the injuries, Smallwood moved to New York City where he studied acting at the Neighborhood Playhouse and established a career as a performer in Broadway productions (Mahalia), films and television.

== Career ==
His films include The Cotton Club (1984), Contact (1997), Deep Impact (1998), Larry David's Sour Grapes, Traffic (2000), The One (2001), Quigley (2003), Spectres (2004) and Embers (2015). On television, he has been a regular and made guest appearances on many series, including Space: Above and Beyond, Millennium, Babylon 5, The X-Files, Curb Your Enthusiasm, Seinfeld, Murphy Brown, Star Trek: Voyager, Star Trek: Enterprise, Friends, The Wayans Bros. and The Sarah Silverman Program.

He often plays military characters, and as a science fiction fan, he always longed to play a Star Trek alien. He came close on Voyager when he played the human form of a disguised alien, but it was not until Enterprise that he played a fully alien character, a sympathetic Xindi, for several episodes.

Smallwood sometimes sings in his acting roles. He plays his guitar on several occasions on Space: Above and Beyond, as Commodore Ross. His character on Millennium sang to people before euthanizing them. He is the vocalist in the blues band Incarnation led by bassist Jerry Jemmott. Their self-titled first album, produced in 1994 at Clark Dimond's Dimond Studio in the Sangre de Cristo Mountains, is a tribute to the music of Delta Blues King Robert Johnson with 15 tracks written by or associated with Johnson. It was actually recorded in 1981 at Greene St. Recording featuring guitarist Arlen Roth. They were joined by Pat Conte on Guitar and T C James on piano with Herb Lovelle on drums.

Smallwood was one of the two actors in Bruce Nauman's video installation, "Good Boy Bad Boy" (1985).

He is the author of Return to Eden, an anthology of 33 personal essays describing his tour of duty in the Vietnam War, his life as performer and his return to Vietnam in 2004. Some of these essays previously appeared in magazines. In 2006, the mp3 version of Return to Eden was first runner-up in the audio/spoken word category at the Fifth Annual DIY Book Festival, which celebrates independent authors and publishers. In 2009, he hosted the hybrid television radio horror anthology series As Darkness Falls.

== Filmography ==
=== Film ===
Year	Title	Role	Notes
1984	The Cotton Club	Kid Griffin	
1985	Turk 182	Reporter at Bridge	
1987	The Secret of My Success	Executive	Uncredited
1990	Presumed Innocent	Detective Harold Greer	
1995	Aurora: Operation Intercept	Agent #1	
1996	Bio-Dome	Cmdr. Gates	
1996	Black Sheep	Election Analyst	
1997	Contact	Mission Director	
1997	Most Wanted	Police Chief William Watson	
1998	Sour Grapes	Anesthesiologist #2	
1998	Deep Impact	Ivan Brodsky	
1998	Strangeland	Capt. Churchill Robbins	
2000	Traffic	Partygoer #4	
2001	The One	Prison Warden	
2001	Air Panic	Keller	
2002	Like Mike	Mr. Reynolds	
2003	Melvin Goes to Dinner	Passenger	
2003	Quigley	Angel #2	
2004	Spectres	Will Franklin	
2004	The Eavesdropper	Gen. Humes	
2005	Heads N TailZ	Hobo	
2006	Final Move	Myron	
2006	False Prophets	Isaiah	
2006	Hood of Horror	Stevens	
2007	Flight of the Living Dead: Outbreak on a Plane	Col. Wolff	
2007	Fighting Words	Franklin	
2007	Evan Almighty	Committee Member	
2007	Dark Mirror	Detective Williams	
2009	Black Dynamite	Congressman Monroe James	
2015	Forgiveness	Captain Kittridge	
2015	Pixels	CIA Chief	
2015	Embers	Teacher	
2017	Girlfriend's Day	Governor Speakman	
2017	The Lady Killers	William	
2018	Another Time	TV show host	
2019	Loners	Father Monty	
2020	Sylvie's Love	Dr. Parker	
2020	Izzy Lyon: The Unspun Truth	Mordecai Fredericksonton III	
2021	Together Together	Carson	

=== Television ===
Year	Title	Role	Notes
1977	Contract on Cherry Street	Bus Driver	Television film
1988	Guiding Light	Security Guard	Episode #1.8319
1981	Cagney & Lacey	Ace Truck Driver	Episode: "Pilot"
1981	For Ladies Only	Tornado	Television film
1981	Texas	Lou	5 episodes
1983	One Life to Live	Airport Page	2 episodes
1983	As the World Turns	Detective	2 episodes
1985	ABC Weekend Special	Harry	Episode: "The Adventures of a Two-Minute Werewolf"
1991–1993	Reasonable Doubts	Michaels / Briggs	3 episodes
1991, 1997	Seinfeld	Various roles	Episodes: "The Pen", "The Parking Garage", "The Summer of George"
1992	Jake and the Fatman	Lawyer	Episode: "Stormy Weather: Part 1"
1994	Martin	Darrell	Episode: "Arms Are for Hugging"
1994	Murphy Brown	Bartender	Episode: "Reporters Make Strange Bedfellows"
1994	Silk Stalkings	Hotel Manager	Episode: "Vengeance"
1995	Me and the Boys	Rev. Watkins	Episode: "Money to Burn"
1995	Get Smart	President Mazabuka	Episode: "Goodbye Ms. Chip"
1995	Sister, Sister	Preacher	Episode: "I Do"
1995	Wings	Agent Stark	Episode: "The Person Formerly Known as Lowell"
1995	Babylon 5	David Endawi	Episode: "Matters of Honor"
1995–1996	Space: Above and Beyond	Commodore Ross	16 episodes
1996	The X-Files	Sheriff Andy Taylor	Episode: "Home"
1996	Mr. & Mrs. Smith	Mr. X	Episode: "The Impossible Mission Episode"
1997	Flipper	Mo James	Episode: "Beach Music"
1997	Diagnosis: Murder	District Attorney Ferris	Episode: "Open and Shut"
1998	Blackout Effect	Harold	Television film
1998	Millennium	Various roles	Episode: "Goodbye Charlie"
1998	Pensacola: Wings of Gold	Col. Gibson	Episode: "Trials and Tribulations"
1998	Frasier	Detective	Episode: "Ain't Nobody's Business If I Do"
1998	The Wayans Bros.	Lionel Cooper	Episode: "The Rich Girl"
1998	Night Man	General Nordoff	Episode: "Hitchhiker"
1998	Inferno	Police Chief	Television film
1998	Star Trek: Voyager	Adm. Bullock	Episode: "In the Flesh"
1998	Seven Days	Mr. Donovan	Episode: "Sleepers"
1998–1999	Malcolm & Eddie	T.R. Hawkins	7 episodes
1999, 2003	The Practice	Various roles	2 episodes
2000	The Others	Col. Montgomery	Episode: "Till Then"
2000	The Invisible Man	Anders	Episode: "Ralph"
2000	Opposite Sex	Military Officer	Episode: "Pilot"
2000	Bull	Priest	Episode: "Amen"
2000	Curb Your Enthusiasm	Restaurant Owner	Episode: "The Pants Tent"
2000	Level 9	Pilot	Episode: "Through the Looking Glass"
2001	JAG	Capt. Baxter	Episode: "The Iron Coffin"
2001	Kate Brasher	Mr. Parks	Episode: "Jeff"
2001	Titus	Sgt. Gordon	Episode: "Private Dave"
2002	The Chronicle	Alonso Freewald	Episode: "Touched by an Alien"
2002	Friends	Mr. Tyler	Episode: "The One with the Cooking Class"
2002	For the People	Judge	Episode: "Come Blow Your Whistle"
2003	Malcolm in the Middle	Baffert	Episode: "Academic Octathalon"
2003–2004	Star Trek: Enterprise	Xindi-Primate Councilor	9 episodes
2005	All of Us	Mr. Ashton	Episode: "Movin' on Up"
2006	The Loop	Dr. Evangelatos	Episode: "Trouble in the Saddle"
2006	My Name Is Earl	Hostage Negotiator	Episode: "Boogeyman"
2007–2010	The Sarah Silverman Program	God	4 episodes
2008	Chocolate News	Dr. Hubert Sunland	Episode #1.3
2012	The First Family	Admiral Masini	Episode: "Pilot"
2014	Suspense	John Carnby	Episode: "The Return of the Sorcerer"
2014	Modern Family	Judge	Episode: "Halloween 3: AwesomeLand"
2016	Send Me: An Original Web Series	Michael	2 episodes
2017	Workaholics	Pastor	Episode: "Tactona 420"
2018	Dream Corp LLC	General Jim Joynose Sr.	Episode: "Accordion Jim"
2019	Will & Grace	Professor Henry Rice	Episode: "Dead Man Texting"
2019	The Baxters	Arthur	2 episodes

=== Video games ===
Year	Title	Role
1995	Agile Warrior F-111X	Socom officer
1996	Tom Clancy's SSN	Adm. Jeb Thomas
2004	Men of Valor	Dandridge
2005	Ultimate Spider-Man	Beetle
