= The Xindi =

- Star Trek: Enterprise episode
- Episode no.: Season 3 Episode 1
- Directed by: Allan Kroeker
- Written by: Rick Berman; Brannon Braga
- Production code: 301
- Original air date: September 10, 2003

Guest appearances
- Richard Lineback – Kessick; Stephen McHattie – Alien Foreman; Tucker Smallwood – Xindi-Primate Councilor; Randy Oglesby – Degra; Rick Worthy – Jannar; Scott MacDonald – Commander Dolim; Marco Sanchez – Corporal Romero; Daniel Dae Kim – Corporal Chang; Nathan Anderson – Sergeant Kemper; Steven Culp – Major Hayes; Chris Freeman – Alien Head Guard; Adam Taylor Gordon – Young Charles Tucker

Episode chronology
← Previous "The Expanse"	Next → "Anomaly"
- Star Trek: Enterprise season 3

"The Xindi" is the 53rd episode of the American science fiction television series Star Trek: Enterprise, the first episode of the third season. It first aired on September 10, 2003, on UPN. The episode was written by executive producers Rick Berman and Brannon Braga, and directed by Allan Kroeker.

Set in the 22nd century, the series follows the adventures of the first Starfleet starship Enterprise, registration NX-01. Beginning with this episode, season three of Enterprise features an ongoing storyline following an attack on Earth by previously unknown aliens called the Xindi at the end of season two. In this episode, the crew of the Enterprise attempt to track down the location of the Xindi homeworld by asking a lone Xindi enslaved in a mining colony. After being tricked by the mining foreman, Captain Jonathan Archer (Scott Bakula) and Commander Charles "Trip" Tucker III (Connor Trinneer) escape with the Xindi, with assistance from Lieutenant Malcolm Reed (Dominic Keating) and the ship's new Military Assault Command Operations (MACO) team.

"The Xindi" saw the first appearance of several new sets, as well as a new costume for Sub-Commander T'Pol (Jolene Blalock). The episode saw a large number of guest stars, including several who would recur several more times during the third season such as Major Hayes played by Steven Culp, Tucker Smallwood as the Xindi-Primate Councilor and Randy Oglesby as Degra. The episode received ratings of 2.6/5 percent according to Nielsen Media Research, and was watched by 4.1 million viewers. "The Xindi" received a mixed reception from critics, who praised the increase of action promised for the season by this episode but criticised elements such as the writing and the MACOs.

== Plot ==
As Enterprise travels deeper into the Delphic Expanse, a secret council of aliens discuss what to do with the lone human spaceship. Meanwhile, Captain Jonathan Archer (Scott Bakula) directs Enterprise to a mining penal colony within the Expanse. He then strikes a deal with the mine's foreman (Stephen McHattie): in exchange for a half-liter of liquid platinum, Archer and Commander Charles "Trip" Tucker III (Connor Trinneer) will be allowed to meet a Primate worker named Kessick (Richard Lineback).

Archer requests the coordinates of Xindus, the Xindi homeworld, from Kessick (who reveals that he is one of five Xindi species) but the alien refuses to help unless Archer helps him escape. Archer declines, but he soon learns that the foreman had ulterior motives, since he has ordered three warships to overpower Enterprise and enslave his crew. Kessick claims to know how to escape the mine, but asks for Archer's help in return for guiding the Starfleet officers. Archer reluctantly agrees, and Kessick leads him and Tucker through the mine's sewage removal system. However, the group is soon detected in a conduit, and the foreman floods the system with plasma in an effort to kill them. They narrowly escape being killed, but quickly fall into the hands of the mine's security forces.

Meanwhile, Sub-Commander T'Pol (Jolene Blalock) persuades Lieutenant Malcolm Reed (Dominic Keating) to allow the newly assigned MACOs (Military Assault Command Operations) to attempt an extraction. Led by him, they perform remarkably well in combat, and manage to rescue Archer, Tucker, and Kessick. Enterprise then leaves orbit just as the warships arrive. Kessick dies, but not before providing coordinates for the Xindi homeworld. When the ship reaches this position, there is nothing but a 120-year-old field of space debris.

== Production ==
The episode followed up on the plot introduced in the final instalment of the second season in which a probe from an unknown alien species attacks Earth. A number of new sets and costumes were required, with preparations beginning for some departments up to three weeks before filming began. One change which was made was a new outfit for T'Pol, with costume tests taking place a week in advance of filming. The redesign was due to studio executives wanting the show to appeal more to the 18–49 male demographic. The production team looked to emulate the mid-series boost that the introduction of Seven of Nine provided on Star Trek: Voyager. Kate O'Hara of New York Magazine later chided in reference to the change, "Women of the future will certainly choose to wear tight, uncomfortable, skin-tight catsuits!"

"The Xindi" was seen as a new pilot by executive producers Brannon Braga and Rick Berman, who also wrote the episode. Braga said: "We were re-establishing an Enterprise that was going to be a little bit different this year, so we had to think of it in those terms." They felt the best way to do this was to immediately reveal the Xindi to the audience, and to give the MACOs something to do in order to introduce them. He called it a "big episode" as they sought to set up the rest of season. The shoot began on June 26, 2003, taking nine days instead of the usual seven to complete. One of the special effects used ground Styrofoam, which had been dyed blue and processed through a wood chipper, to represent the mineral Trellium-D. The Styrofoam particles stuck to the actors' shoes and costumes and ended up being spread throughout the Paramount lot where the series was filmed. It would turn up in unexpected places on set for the rest of the series, and was found in among the sets as they were being dismantled after the end of season four.

=== Guest cast ===
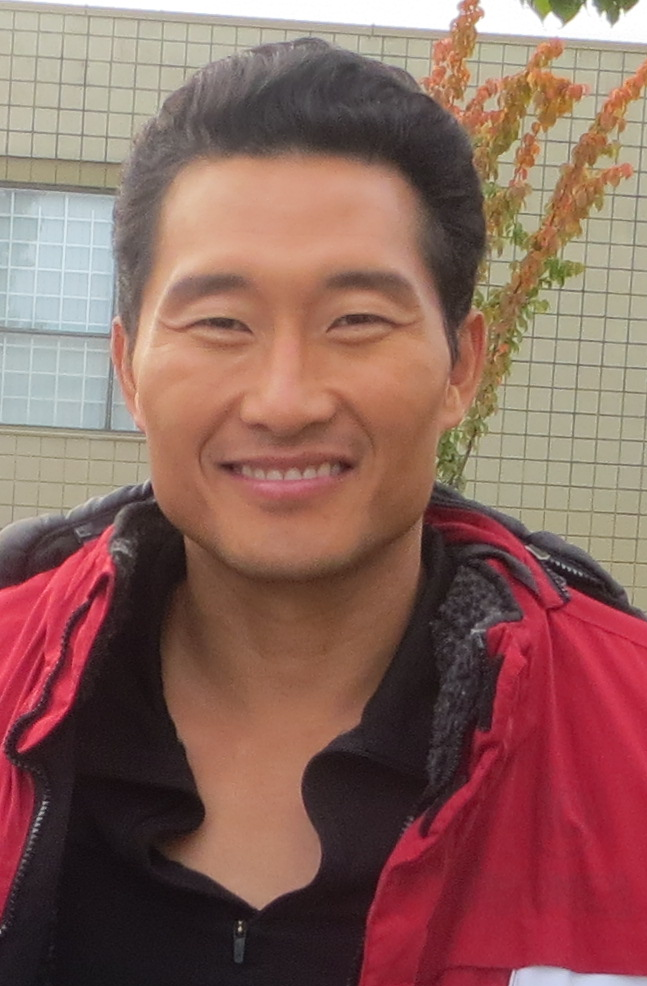
"The Xindi" marked the first appearance of several actors in recurring roles, including Daniel Dae Kim (pictured).

"The Xindi" featured several actors who would reappear throughout the season. These included the MACO marines under the command of Major Hayes, played by Steven Culp, in his first of five episodes. At the time of his appearance in "The Xindi", he felt that he did not have any characterisation to work with. During the production of his second episode, "The Shipment", Culp read an article in the Los Angeles Times about a troubled youth who joined the military and in serving in the Iraq War had found himself. After discussing it with the director, this became the basis for the character. Daniel Dae Kim made his first of three appearances as Corporal Chang; he had previously appeared as Gotana-Retz in the Voyager episode "Blink of an Eye". Nathan Anderson had previously appeared as Namon in the Voyager episode "Nemesis"; he made one further appearance as Sergeant Kemper in the following episode, "Anomaly".

Other actors included the members of the Xindi council. As with Kim and Anderson, Tucker Smallwood had already appeared on Voyager, as Admiral Bullock in the episode "In the Flesh". He appeared as his Xindi character nine times during the third season of Enterprise. Randy Oglesby, who played Degra, was another Voyager alumnus. He had appeared as Kir in the episode "Counterpoint". Rick Worthy had appeared as several different characters in the Star Trek franchise, including an appearance in the 1998 film Star Trek: Insurrection. As well as Kornan in the Star Trek: Deep Space Nine episode "Soldiers of the Empire", he too had appeared in Voyager, but in two roles; first as the androids 3947 and 122 in "Prototype" and then as Noah Lessing in "Equinox". In addition, making a return to the Star Trek franchise was Stephen McHattie, who had previously appeared as the Romulan senator Vreenak in the Deep Space Nine episode "In the Pale Moonlight".

== Reception ==
"The Xindi" was first aired in the United States on UPN on September 10, 2003. According to Nielsen Media Research, it received a 2.6/5 percent share among adults. This means that it was seen by 2.6 percent of all households, and 5 percent of all of those watching television at the time of the broadcast. It was estimated that "The Xindi" was watched by 4.1 million viewers. The following episode, "Anomaly", received the same rating but the viewer number increased by 200,000.

Robert Bianco reviewed "The Xindi" for USA Today, giving it two out of four stars. He said that while the Xindi storyline "does promise to provide more action and excitement", some of the alterations "smack[ed] of desperation". He called T'Pol "Seven of Vulcan", and said the main issue with the series was the "subpar" writing. In this episode, he felt that Tucker was written so poorly that Trineer seemed like he was overacting to compensate for it. Rob Owen of the Pittsburgh Post-Gazette described the new season as "less boring", he appreciated the faster pace than most episodes "but it does trip over itself", but criticized the incomprehensible aliens and ridiculous seduction scene between T'Pol and Trip.

IGN gave it one out of five, and said it was "like watching a television episode made up of all the things from the 'Stuff We've Tried That Doesn't Work on Star Trek' list." Criticism was directed at the introduction of the MACOs, which were described as Starship Troopers clones, and at the modification to the theme tune. The Xindi themselves were described as "bad Farscape knock offs", and the reviewer said that they set a poor tone for the rest of the season. Aint It Cool News gave it 2.5 out of five, and wrote: "This is easily the most mundane and haphazardly constructed of the Enterprise season openers." Michelle Erica Green of TrekNation said she was of a "double mind" about "The Xindi" as there were both good and bad elements. She praised the action sequences, the make-up and McHattie as the alien foreman. Green enjoyed the twist at the end with the Xindi homeworld being already destroyed, and felt that the Xindi species could be interesting if developed well. She wondered if the writers had learned at all from past mistakes, as the show was still not doing a good job with the dramatic tension among characters. She said the guest Xindi was given "more personality, wit and depth than any of these new semi-regulars" and feared the MACO's would not get the character development they would need, as it still had not happened for Mayweather after two seasons.

== Novelization ==
"The Xindi" was adapted as a novel in conjunction with the preceding episode, "The Expanse", by J.M. Dillard. Entitled The Expanse, the book was published by Pocket Books in trade paperback format in October 2003.

== Home media release ==
The first home media release of "The Xindi" was as part of the season three DVD box set, released in the United States on September 27, 2005. The Blu-ray release of Enterprise was released on January 7, 2014.
