= Star Trek: Enterprise season 4 =

Season of television series

Star Trek: Enterprise
- Season 4
- Blu-ray cover
- No. of episodes: 22

Release
- Original network: UPN
- Original release: October 8, 2004 – May 13, 2005

Season chronology
- ← Previous; Season 3

The fourth and final season of the American science fiction television series Star Trek: Enterprise commenced airing on the UPN network in the United States on October 8, 2004 and concluded on May 13, 2005 after airing 22 episodes. Set in the 22nd century, the series follows the adventures of the first Starfleet starship Enterprise, registration NX-01. The fourth season saw changes made to the production team, with Manny Coto becoming the show runner. He had joined the team during the third season as a co-executive producer. Other changes included Star Trek novelists Judith and Garfield Reeves-Stevens being brought on board as writers.

Season four was the final season of the series, with the show being cancelled during the filming of the episode "In A Mirror, Darkly". Following the cancellation, fans of the show conducted protests and raised funds to pay for a fifth season, however their efforts were unsuccessful. "These Are The Voyages..." was the final episode of the series, and gained the highest number of viewers for the season according to Nielsen Media Research. Despite critics describing the fourth season in a warmer manner, the finale was received poorly, with Rick Berman later regretting the storyline. The series was nominated for three Emmy Awards for episodes in the fourth season, but the only award won was an Outstanding Visual Effects for a Broadcast Series at the 2005 Visual Effects Society awards.

== Plot overview ==
Following the season-long Xindi arc during the third season, season four comprised several shorter story arcs. These included a wrap-up to the Temporal Cold War storyline that began with the pilot episode, "Broken Bow". Other arcs covered the differences between the Klingons seen in Enterprise, compared to those seen in series set later in the Star Trek timeline. One of the senior officers on the Enterprise is killed, during an Andorian story. The season also featured a greater number of references to Star Trek: The Original Series, with Orion slave girls and genetically engineered humans similar to Khan Noonien Singh appearing in one particular story arc, which also featured the return of Brent Spiner to the Star Trek franchise.

== Cast ==
=== Main cast ===
- Scott Bakula as Captain Jonathan Archer
- Jolene Blalock as T'Pol
- Connor Trinneer as Commander Charles "Trip" Tucker III
- Dominic Keating as Lieutenant Malcolm Reed
- Linda Park as Ensign Hoshi Sato
- Anthony Montgomery as Ensign Travis Mayweather
- John Billingsley as Doctor Phlox

=== Guest cast ===
- Gary Graham as Ambassador Soval (6 episodes)
- Jeffrey Combs as Commander Shran (5 episodes)
- Derek Magyar as Commander Kelby (5 episodes)
- Eric Pierpoint as Harris (4 episodes)
- Brent Spiner as Arik Soong / Lt. Cmdr. Data (voice only) (4 episodes)
- Vaughn Armstrong as Admiral Maxwell Forrest/Captain Maximilian Forrest (3 episodes)
- Abby Brammell as Persis (3 episodes)
- Michael Reilly Burke as Koss (3 episodes)
- Robert Foxworth as Administrator V'Las (3 episodes)
- Ada Maris as Captain Erika Hernandez (3 episodes)
- Brian Thompson as Admiral Valdore (3 episodes)
- Lee Arenberg as Tellarite Ambassador Gral (2 episodes)
- James Avery as General K'Vagh (2 episodes)
- Joanna Cassidy as T'Les (2 episodes)
- Adam Clark as Josiah (2 episodes)
- Jack Donner as Vulcan Priest (2 episodes)
- J. Michael Flynn as Nijil (2 episodes)
- Adam Grimes as Lokesh (2 episodes)
- Harry Groener as Nathan Samuels (2 episodes)
- Peter Mensah as Daniel Greaves (2 episodes)
- Alec Newman as Malik (2 episodes)
- Richard Riehle as Dr. Jeremy Lucas (2 episodes)
- John Rubinstein as Minister Kuvak (2 episodes)
- John Schuck as Antaak (2 episodes)
- Geno Silva as Senator Vrax (2 episodes)
- Terrell Tilford as Marab (2 episodes)
- Johanna Watts as Gannet Brooks (2 episodes)
- Peter Weller as John Frederick Paxton (2 episodes)
- Matt Winston as Temporal Agent Daniels (2 episodes)
- Kara Zediker as T'Pau (2 episodes)
- Molly Brink as Lieutenant Talas (2 episode)
- Jim Fitzpatrick as Commander Williams (1 episode)
- John Fleck as Silik (1 episode)
- Seth MacFarlane as Ensign Rivers (1 episode)
- Bill Cobbs as Dr. Emory Erickson (1 episode)

== Episodes ==
In the following table, episodes are listed by the order in which they aired.

No. overall	No. in season	Title	In-universe date	Directed by	Written by	Original release date	Prod. code	U.S. viewers (millions)
77	1	"Storm Front"	Unknown	Allan Kroeker	Manny Coto	October 6, 2004	40358-077	2.89
After destroying the Xindi weapon, Enterprise finds itself in the 20th century during World War II with Nazis in control of the North Eastern USA.
78	2	"Storm Front, Part II"	Unknown	David Straiton	Manny Coto	October 13, 2004	40358-078	3.11
Archer joins Silik to stop the alien Nazis, restore the timeline and end the Temporal Cold War.
79	3	"Home"	Unknown	Allan Kroeker	Mike Sussman	October 20, 2004	40358-079	3.16
Enterprise is welcomed home after saving Earth and the crew takes a much needed vacation. Tucker and T'Pol visit Vulcan where T'Pol must consider marriage to Koss. Erika Hernandez becomes captain of the Columbia and renews her acquaintance with Archer. Phlox encounters prejudice on Earth.
80	4	"Borderland"	May 17, 2154	David Livingston	Ken LaZebnik	October 27, 2004	40358-080	3.18
Dr. Arik Soong restores his relationship with his genetically-enhanced "children".
81	5	"Cold Station 12"	Unknown	Mike Vejar	Alan Brennert (Note: Credited as Michael Bryant)	November 3, 2004	40358-081	3.39
A space station crew is held hostage as Dr. Arik Soong and his Augments work to obtain hundreds of Augment embryos in hopes of creating an Augment population.
82	6	"The Augments"	May 27, 2154	LeVar Burton	Mike Sussman	November 10, 2004	40358-082	3.39
Dr. Arik Soong finds himself overthrown as "father" of the Augments and Archer rushes to prevent the destruction of a Klingon colony. As a result of his dashed hopes of enhancing humans, Soong turns in a new direction of research.
83	7	"The Forge"	Unknown	Michael Grossman	Garfield Reeves-Stevens & Judith Reeves-Stevens	November 17, 2004	40358-083	3.15
Earth's embassy on Vulcan is partially destroyed by a bomb, killing Admiral Forrest. Archer and T'Pol travel to Vulcan in search of an alleged terrorist group blamed for the explosion, of which T'Pol's mother is a member.
84	8	"Awakening"	Unknown	Roxann Dawson	André Bormanis	November 24, 2004	40358-084	3.38
Archer and T'Pol find T'Pau and T'Pol's mother and learn that Archer is carrying Surak's katra.
85	9	"Kir'Shara"	Unknown	David Livingston	Mike Sussman	December 1, 2004	40358-085	3.19
Archer and T'Pol bring back the Kir'Shara (Surak's artifact) that will lead to vast changes in the Vulcan world. T'Pol's Pa'nar Syndrome is cured by T'Pau.
86	10	"Daedalus"	Unknown	David Straiton	Alan Brennert & Ken LaZebnik	January 12, 2005	40358-086	3.03
Dr. Emory Erickson, inventor of the transporter, conducts a long-range experiment in order to recover his lost son.
87	11	"Observer Effect"	Unknown	Mike Vejar	Garfield Reeves-Stevens & Judith Reeves-Stevens	January 19, 2005	40358-087	2.76
Organians test the Enterprise crew by observing their reactions to a deadly silicon-based infection.
88	12	"Babel One"	November 12, 2154	David Straiton	Mike Sussman & André Bormanis	January 26, 2005	40358-088	2.53
Andorians threaten war on the Tellarites after apparently being attacked by a Tellarite vessel en route to trade talks.
89	13	"United"	November 15, 2154	David Livingston	S : Manny Coto; T : Judith Reeves-Stevens & Garfield Reeves-Stevens	February 2, 2005	40358-089	2.81
Archer and Shran engage in mortal combat as Archer tries to unite the Andorians and Tellarites who are being set at each other's throats by a remote-controlled Romulan vessel.
90	14	"The Aenar"	Unknown	Mike Vejar	S : Manny Coto; T : André Bormanis	February 9, 2005	40358-090	3.17
The drone Romulan ship that attacked the Andorians is under the control of an Aenar, an offshoot race of the Andorians. Archer and Shran join forces to rescue the Aenar and stop the Romulan plot.
91	15	"Affliction"	November 27, 2154	Michael Grossman	S : Manny Coto; T : Mike Sussman	February 16, 2005	40358-091	3.17
Phlox is kidnapped by the Klingons who are seeking to cure a disease caused by an attempt to create Klingon/Augment hybrids; T'Pol's mental abilities grow after she conducts her first mind meld.
92	16	"Divergence"	Unknown	David Barrett	Garfield Reeves-Stevens & Judith Reeves-Stevens	February 23, 2005	40358-092	2.96
With the Columbia's help, the Enterprise crew grapples with sabotage to their ship as they pursue the truth behind the kidnapping of Phlox. The disease is cured, but genetic mutations will make many Klingons appear human-like for generations to come.
93	17	"Bound"	December 27, 2154	Allan Kroeker	Manny Coto	April 13, 2005	40358-093	2.56
As a gift for negotiating with the Orion Syndicate, Archer receives three Orion Slave Girls, but these "gifts" have their own agenda. Meanwhile, Trip and T'Pol come to terms with the psychic bond that has been created between them.
94	18	"In a Mirror, Darkly"	January 13, 2155	James L. Conway	Mike Sussman	April 20, 2005	40358-094	2.59
95	19	"In a Mirror, Darkly"	January 18, 2155	Marvin V. Rush	S : Manny Coto; T : Mike Sussman	April 27, 2005	40358-095	2.92
In the Mirror Universe, Commander Archer mutinies against Captain Forrest in order to capture a future Earth ship found in Tholian space and Archer commandeers the 23rd-century Defiant from the Tholians and uses it in a nefarious power grab.
96	20	"Demons"	January 19, 2155	LeVar Burton	Manny Coto	May 4, 2005	40358-096	3.01
A xenophobic faction of humanity threatens to undermine talks to form a new coalition of planets.
97	21	"Terra Prime"	January 22, 2155	Marvin V. Rush	S : André Bormanis; T : Manny Coto; S/T : Judith Reeves-Stevens, Garfield Reeves-Stevens	May 11, 2005	40358-097	3.80
A human isolationist leader threatens to destroy Starfleet Command unless all aliens leave Earth immediately. His bargaining tool: a baby cloned from DNA belonging to Trip and T'Pol.
98	22	"These Are the Voyages..."	47457.1 (Note: Set during "The Pegasus".)	Allan Kroeker	Rick Berman & Brannon Braga	May 18, 2005	40358-098	3.80
Two centuries in the future, two crew members of the USS Enterprise (NCC-1701-D) (Commander William Riker and Counselor Deanna Troi) observe a holodeck creation of the final voyage of the NX-01 in 2161 (six years after the events of "Terra Prime") as it returns to Earth for decommissioning and the signing of the United Federation of Planets charter.

== Production ==
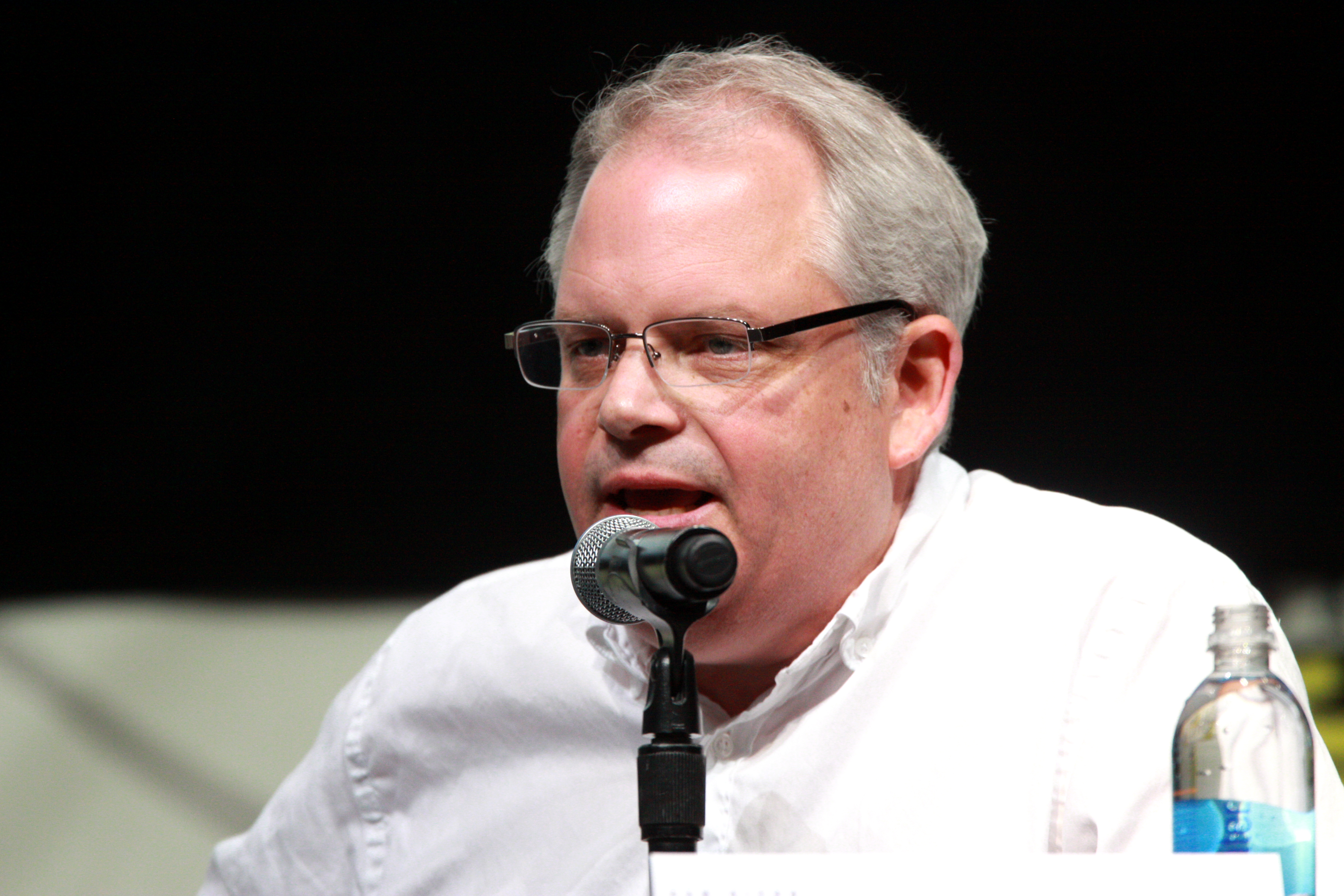
Manny Coto became the show runner for the fourth season of Enterprise, having joined as co-executive producer during season three.

The series had been at risk of cancellation following the third season. But the rights holders, Paramount Television, reduced the cost per episode that it charged network UPN from $1.7 million per episode to $800,000. The broadcast schedule was subsequently changed and repeat episodes were moved to Friday nights at 8pm ET / 9pm PT, with season four making its debut in that timeslot on October 8, 2004. TV Guide described the new time slot as "where the network was drawing virtually no viewers with what one executive calls 'eighth runs of slasher movies'". Enterprise was not the first Star Trek series to be moved to a Friday night timeslot following a budget cut, as Star Trek: The Original Series for the third season was moved to a 10pm ET timeslot where it was subsequently cancelled. Manny Coto said the budget cuts were mostly offset by the cost savings of filming using digital cameras.

The fourth season also saw a change in the production team. Enterprise had previously been run by the show's creators, Rick Berman and Brannon Braga, who were also the executive producers. Manny Coto joined the production team during the third season as a co-executive producer following his work on the series Odyssey 5. His scripts were well received, having written such episodes as "Similitude". For the fourth season, Coto was credited as the show runner. He explained in an interview that "What's been publicized, that Rick and Brannon have stepped back and I've moved in, is not exactly true. I've kinda moved in with them, so to speak, so we're all three running the show. I'm actually more in charge of writing, I guess, dealing with the writers and the 'writing room,' coming up with stories that Rick and Brannon approve or not approve, or give notes on." He explained that the process was for the three of them to pitch stories together and work on fleshing them out.

Following Coto's appointment as executive producer, he also sought to make changes to the writing team. Judith and Garfield Reeves-Stevens joined the team, having been known previously for writing Star Trek novels. These books included collaborations with William Shatner on his Shatnerverse novels. Their first television episode written for Star Trek: Enterprise was the first part of the planned Vulcan story arc in season four, "The Forge". They went to write several further episodes during the course of the season, including "Observer Effect", "United", "Divergence" and "Terra Prime". The series continued linking with NASA, with astronauts Terry W. Virts and Michael Fincke appearing as engineers on board the Enterprise in the series finale.

=== Cancellation ===
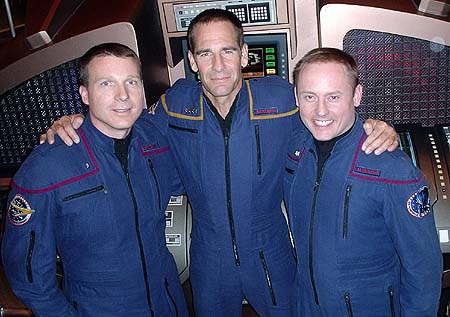
Scott Bakula with astronauts Terry W. Virts and Michael Fincke during the filming of the final episode of Enterprise.

It was announced on February 3, 2005 that Enterprise had been cancelled. The news was passed to the cast and crew on the sixth day of filming of the second part of "In a Mirror, Darkly". Following the broadcast of the final episode, "These Are the Voyages...", it was the first time in eighteen years that there were no new episodes of a Star Trek series scheduled for broadcast. Star Trek: Enterprise was the first live-action spin-off from The Original Series to last less than seven seasons. The end of series cast and crew party was held on April 13, 2005 at the Hollywood Roosevelt Hotel.

The President of Paramount Network Television, David Stapf, said: "The creators, stars and crew of Star Trek: Enterprise ambitiously and proudly upheld the fine traditions of the Star Trek franchise. We are grateful for their contributions to the legacy of Trek and commend them on completing nearly 100 exciting, dramatic and visually stunning episodes. All of us at Paramount warmly bid goodbye to Enterprise, and we all look forward to a new chapter of this enduring franchise in the future."

The cancellation of Enterprise was protested by fans of the series. Actions included around a hundred fans picketing the gates of Paramount Studios. The response to the cancellation was organised on websites such as TrekUnited.com. They raised money which was intended to be used for new Star Trek programming, with $48,000 raised within a month of the cancellation. The website sought to raise $32 million to pay for a full fifth season of the show, but failed to get close only gaining some $87,000 from general donors, plus $3 million of anonymous donations from investors who work in the American spaceflight industry. Rallies were also held elsewhere around the world, and a full page advertisement supporting the show was taken out in the Los Angeles Times. The money was refunded after an unsuccessful campaign, with reportedly only one accidental contact between TrekUnited and Paramount.

== Themes ==
The fourth season sought to be different from the previous series of Enterprise in the way that story arcs worked. In the earlier series there was the ongoing Temporal Cold War plot, with the Xindi attack at the end of the second season resulting in a seasonlong story arc during season three. Instead season four was split up into several smaller arcs which had been planned before the start of the season. The first of these arcs was a resolution to the long-running Temporal Cold War, with Braga stating that the intention was "to resolve [it]... once and for all". This would also mark the final appearance of the Suliban in Enterprise as they were tied into that storyline. The episodes wrapping up the cold war did not reveal the identity of the person from the future who was advising the Suliban. Braga explained in a preseason interview that "Well, we've been debating that for quite some time, and I'll leave that question open. We haven't decided yet. We have some ideas about him — or her — or it. But we haven't settled on any one identity yet. It's still a question mark." The identity of "future guy" was later revealed by Braga on Twitter as Archer from the future.

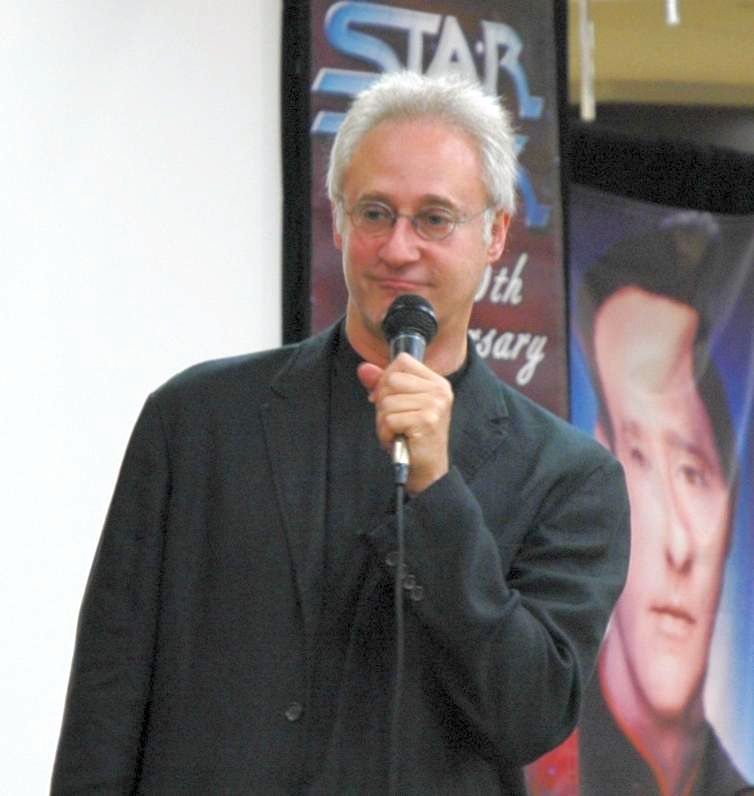
Brent Spiner returned to Star Trek to portray an ancestor of one of his Next Generation characters in an Enterprise story arc.

Brent Spiner returned to the Star Trek franchise, having previously played the character of Data in Star Trek: The Next Generation. In Enterprise he played the role of Dr. Arik Soong, an ancestor of Data's creator. Coto compared the character to Hannibal Lecter and talked about the fear that he inspired in the human authorities during the time of Enterprise due to Soong's actions involving illegal genetics. The storyline involved several references to The Original Series, such as the genetic supermen in the vein of Khan Noonien Singh as first seen in the episode "Space Seed" and later in the 1982 film, Star Trek II: The Wrath of Khan. The first episode of this Enterprise story arc also saw the reappearance of the Orion slave girls as seen in the first pilot of Star Trek, "The Cage". Coto credited this to his idea for the fourth season saying, "What I really wanted to do this season is make the episodes that I as a Star Trek fan would have to see. You know, as a fan of the original series, if I heard that they were doing the Orion slavers and the Eugenics Wars, I would have to be in front of that TV."

The producers also sought to resolve issues with the difference in Enterprise compared to the other series. One of these was the actions and attitudes of the Vulcans; Coto said that "there's a difference between the Vulcans of our era and the Vulcans of later eras. Our Vulcans lie, our Vulcans are monolithic, our Vulcans are not pacifistic." The Vulcan storyline seen in "The Forge", "Awakening" and "Kir'Shara" was compared to the Protestant Reformation by Coto. The arc also reintroduced the character of T'Pau, who was previously seen in The Original Series episode "Amok Time". For "Awakening", a younger version of the character was played by Kara Zediker.

== Reception ==
=== Ratings ===
Following the move to a Friday evening timeslot, Enterprise was going up directly against episodes of Stargate SG-1 on the Sci Fi Channel. The overall ratings by Nielsen Media Research placed the show in 150th place for the season. The season opened with ratings of 2.0/4 percent for the first part of "Storm Front", but the series lowest ratings were received for the mid season episode "Observer Effect". Five other episodes equalled the 2.0/4 percent ratings of "Storm Front" while "Cold Station 12", "The Augments" and "Kir'Shara" each received 2.1/4 percent ratings. The highest ratings of the seasons were received for the series finale, "These Are The Voyages...", which gained ratings of 2.4/4 percent. Rick Berman credited the falling ratings received by the series to a variety of elements saying, "The show certainly had a great start. It got very good reviews and it had a huge audience for the first half a dozen episodes and then it started to slip. I could take the blame for it. I could put the blame into the scripts. I could put the blame into franchise fatigue. I don’t know why it didn’t work."

=== Reviews ===
The links to The Original Series were seen as positive improvements to Star Trek: Enterprise by critics, including elements such as the appearance of the Mirror Universe and the Orion slave girls. Other story arcs praised included the Augment arc with Brent Spiner and the return of the genetic supermen made famous by Ricardo Montalbán's Khan in The Original Series. Phillip Chung of AsianWeek bemoaned the loss of the show, because he felt that it had improved over time and due to the franchise's continued progressive stance in showing racial minorities outside of the normal stereotypes.

In 2019, CBR rated Season 4 of Star Trek: Enterprise as the 19th best of 31 seasons of all Star Trek shows at that time, and said although it was a strong season "there were some big misses."

==== "These Are the Voyages..." ====
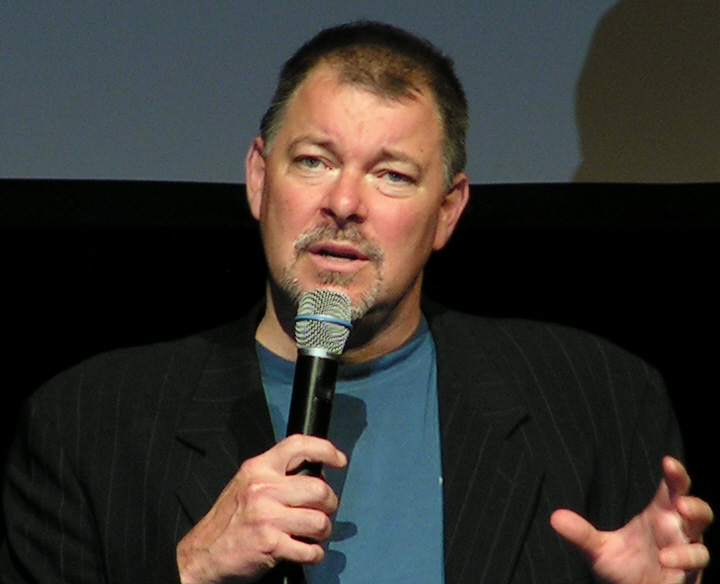
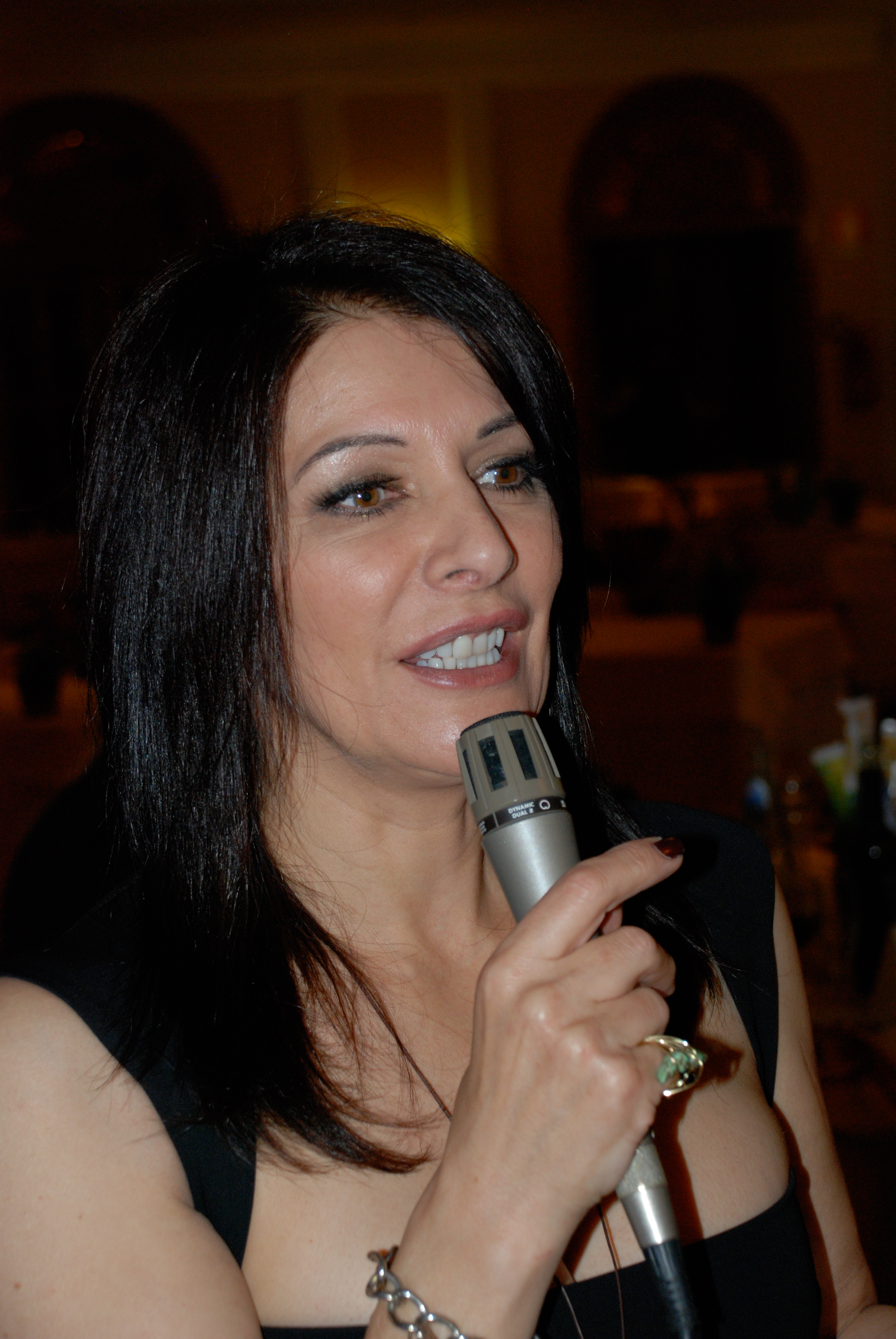
Jonathan Frakes and Marina Sirtis returned to their The Next Generation roles for the series finale of Enterprise.

The critical response to the final episode, "These Are the Voyages..." was mostly negative. For example, the Wisconsin State Journal described it as "hands down the worst series finale ever". The episode featured a holodeck simulation on the USS Enterprise (NCC-1701-D) from Star Trek: The Next Generation during the events of the episode "The Pegasus" and the return of Commander William Riker (Jonathan Frakes) and Counselor Deanna Troi (Marina Sirtis). It was written by Berman and Braga, who responded to negative criticism of the episode by saying "You have to remember that under normal circumstances most people probably would have thought this was a very cool episode because it has a great concept driving it". Berman later said: "I would have never done it if I had known how people were going to react."

Iain Miller of The Independent on Sunday criticised the appearance of the two The Next Generation characters in the finale, saying: "It was like watching a once great sprinter now gone to fat falling flat on their face while running for a bus." The review also compared the use of the holodeck in the episode as the Star Trek equal of the ninth season of Dallas, which was revealed to be a dream of Pam Ewing in the finale. Thomas Connor of The Chicago Sun-Times gave the finale half a star in his review, saying that the death of Charles "Trip" Tucker III was "the most anticlimactic and dramatically pointless death in the history of the franchise".

The Boston Herald described the episode as one of the best ways to disappoint fans during 2005, saying that it "turned out to be an inappropriate ode to Star Trek: The Next Generation." A preview of the episode in the Daily Herald by Ted Cox suggested that "it could never figure out if it was meant to appeal to devoted trekkies or a general audience. In alienating both, it appealed to neither."

=== Awards ===
Episodes from the fourth season of Enterprise received three nominations for the 2005 Emmy Awards. The hairdesign/stylist team were nominated for Outstanding Hairstyling For a Series for their work in the episode "In A Mirror, Darkly" but lost to the team on Deadwood. Vince Deadrick Jr was nominated for Outstanding Stunt Coordination for his work in the episodes "Borderland" and "Cold Station 12" but was beaten by Matt Taylor for 24. The third nomination was not for a specific episode, but for the overall season with the makeup team nominated for Outstanding Prosthetic Makeup For a Series, Miniseries, Movie Or a Special. The award went to HBO's The Life and Death of Peter Sellers. The series was nominated for Best Network Television Series at the 31st Saturn Awards, but the award went to Lost.

The second part of "Storm Front" was awarded the Outstanding Visual Effects for a Broadcast Series at the 2005 Visual Effects Society awards. Ronald D. Moore received the award on behalf of the production team. The dogfight over New York City seen in that episode was also nominated for Outstanding Created Environment in a Live Action Broadcast Program, but lost to the opening sequence of the television series Spartacus.

== Media information ==
Following the end of the series, the fourth season was released on DVD before the end of 2005. It was also included in a complete set containing all four seasons of the series.

Star Trek: Enterprise – Season 4
Set details		Special features	
22 episodes; 6-disc set; 1:85:1 aspect ratio; Subtitles: Danish, Dutch, English, English for the hearing impaired, French, German, Italian, Norwegian, Spanish, Swedish; English (Dolby Digital 5.1 and 2.0 Surround), French, German and Italian and Spanish (Dolby Digital 2.0 Surround)		DVD and Blu-ray: Enterprise Moments: Season 4; Inside the "Mirror" Episodes; Visual Effects Magic; Links to the Legacy; That's a Wrap; Enterprise Secrets; Outtakes; Audio Commentary: "In a Mirror, Darkly, Parts I & II" and "Terra Prime"; Text Commentary: "The Forge", "In a Mirror, Darkly, Part II" and "These Are The Voyages..."; Deleted scenes: "Storm Front", "The Aenar" and "In a Mirror, Darkly, Part II".; Blu-Ray: Before Her Time: Decommissioning Enterprise; In Conversation: Writing Star Trek Enterprise	
Release dates
DVD		Blu-ray	
Region 1	Region 2	United States (Region free)	United Kingdom (Region free)
November 1, 2005	October 31, 2005	April 1, 2014	April 14, 2014
