= Terra Prime =

- Star Trek: Enterprise episode
- Episode no.: Season 4 Episode 21
- Directed by: Marvin V. Rush
- Story by: Judith Reeves-Stevens; Garfield Reeves-Stevens; André Bormanis
- Teleplay by: Judith Reeves-Stevens; Garfield Reeves-Stevens; Manny Coto
- Cinematography by: Douglas Knapp
- Production code: 421
- Original air date: May 13, 2005

Guest appearances
- Peter Weller – John Frederick Paxton; Harry Groener – Nathan Samuels; Gary Graham – Ambassador Soval; Eric Pierpoint – Harris; Adam Clark – Josiah; Peter Mensah – Daniel Greaves; Johanna Watts – Gannet Brooks; Derek Magyar – Commander Kelby; Joel Swetow – Ambassador Thoris; Josh Holt – Ensign Masaro

Episode chronology
← Previous "Demons"	Next → "These Are the Voyages..."
- Star Trek: Enterprise season 4

"Terra Prime" is the 21st episode of the fourth season of the American science fiction television series Star Trek: Enterprise, and originally aired on UPN on May 13, 2005. The story was developed by Judith and Garfield Reeves-Stevens, along with André Bormanis, and developed into a script by the Reeves-Stevenses and show runner Manny Coto. The episode is the second of a two-part story, which started in "Demons". The episode was directed by Marvin Rush, his second for the series.

Set in the 22nd century, the series follows the adventures of the first Starfleet starship Enterprise, registration NX-01. In this episode, John Frederick Paxton, the leader of the xenophobic human group Terra Prime, threatens to use an array on Mars to destroy Starfleet Command, unless all aliens leave Earth immediately. Enterprise, Captain Archer and an away team covertly take a shuttlepod to the array and attempt to stop Paxton and rescue their crew-mates.

The guest actors who appeared in "Demons" were joined by Derek Magyar and Eric Pierpoint, who appeared earlier in the season in "Affliction", while Joel Swetow had previously appeared in episodes of Deep Space Nine and The Next Generation. The script called for a reference to the United States space program and so the Carl Sagan Memorial Station and the Mars Exploration Rover Sojourner were included in a shot added in post production. "Terra Prime" received a Nielsen rating of 2.0/4% and it was praised by critics who described it as a "real" episode and there were suggestions that had Enterprise gone into a further season then the story could have acted as an ongoing subplot. Prior to broadcast, Coto characterized "Terra Prime" as effectively the finale of Enterprise, in contrast to the actual last episode "These Are the Voyages...", which he likened to an epilogue. It was ranked as the best episode of the series by Empire.

== Plot ==
Commanders T'Pol and Tucker remain captives of Paxton, who continues to broadcast his demand on all channels and frequencies. Paxton's action has an unsettling effect on the interspecies conference since it is clear that not all humans support it. On Mars, Paxton allows T'Pol and Tucker to see the baby, and T'Pol uses her scanner to learn that the child is unwell (and that Paxton has been using Rigelian gene therapy to treat himself). Seeking to fine-tune their attack, Paxton then threatens T'Pol in order to force Tucker to optimize the targeting system of the array.

Enterprise is then ordered to Mars to destroy the array, but is turned away when a warning shot from the weapon damages the ship. Gannet Brooks, now in the brig, reveals to Ensign Mayweather she is a Starfleet Intelligence operative, and that Terra Prime probably has an operative aboard. Under the urging of Minister Samuels, the crew of Enterprise conceive a way to approach the deadly station undetected, using a shuttlepod hidden inside the tail of a comet. Captain Archer elects to lead the away mission, along with Lieutenant Reed, Doctor Phlox, and Mayweather.

En route, the shuttle's systems suddenly fail, nearly causing it to crash. Landing on Mars, the team then infiltrate Paxton's ship. Teaming up with Tucker, who has escaped his cell, they battle the Terra Prime followers in the control room. During the shootout, Paxton manages to lock the firing sequence — fortunately, Tucker has altered the targeting, and the beam misses. With Paxton under arrest, the hybrid child, named Elizabeth after Tucker's sister, is brought to Phlox, who unfortunately cannot do anything to save her. Investigations also reveal that Ensign Masaro was the spy, and he dies by his own hand. Back at Starfleet, Archer makes an impassioned speech to convince the delegates to explore the universe's mysteries together.

== Production ==
Judith and Garfield Reeves-Stevens created the story with André Bormanis and developed it into a script with show runner Manny Coto. Because of the nature of the two-part episode, revisions to the scripts for both "Demons" and "Terra Prime" were required as changes occurred in the other script. The Reeves-Stevens felt that a "ticking clock" was required for "Terra Prime", and so the 24-hour deadline set by Paxton's group was written into the end of "Demons". That exact ending was changed on several occasions which resulted in modifications to the "Terra Prime" script. Other changes were made following the filming of "Demons" as the Reeves-Stevens changed some of the dialogue for Paxton after seeing Peter Weller's performance. Shran, played by Jeffrey Combs, was written out of the episode, as the decision was made to have the character appear in the series finale instead.

Filming began on "Terra Prime" on the afternoon of February 15, 2005 and continued until February 25. It was the second episode to be directed by Marvin Rush, who had previously worked on the second part of "In a Mirror, Darkly". Rush was normally the director of photography on Enterprise, and was in the middle of the second day of shooting "Demons" with LeVar Burton as director, when he was asked to direct "Terra Prime", and had to leave immediately to prepare. The majority of sets created for the Martian array had been created for the previous episode, but a set was created to appear as an access tube specially for use in "Terra Prime". In order to represent the shuttlecraft entering the comet, rather than using camera movement, the set was placed on rollers and physically moved to appear turbulent. The Martian landscape was inserted using a green screen where the away team enter the array, and the actors had make-up applied to represent the red dust of the Martian landscape.

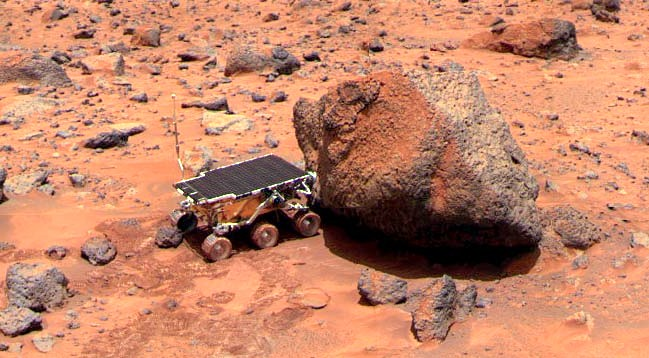
The rover Sojourner was included in a sequence added post production; it had previously appeared in the opening credits of the series

Several guest stars who had appeared in "Demons" continued in their roles in "Terra Prime"; Harry Groener, Peter Mensah and Adam Clark, along with Weller and Watts. A reference to Weller's former show Odyssey 5 is included in the episode, when his character is diagnosed with "Taggart's Syndrome", where Taggart was the name of his character on Odyssey 5. They were joined in this episode by several actors playing recurring roles, including Gary Graham who had played Ambassador Soval since the series pilot and Derek Magyar and Eric Pierpoint, who had played Commander Kelby and Harris respectively earlier in the season in "Affliction". Joel Swetow also appeared in "Terra Prime" as an Andorian Ambassador, who had previously appeared in the pilot of Star Trek: Deep Space Nine and The Next Generation episode "Firstborn" as well as performing voice roles for several Star Trek video games. The baby in the episode was played by a pair of twins, and the pointed Vulcan ears were added in post production.

The script requested two post production shots to be added as references to the American space program, which would have been shown as the shuttlepod landed on Mars. These included the Mars Exploration Rover Sojourner which appeared in the opening titles of Enterprise, now lying dormant and covered in dust. A further shot showed a plaque which denoted the landing spot of the rover on board the Carl Sagan Memorial Station. Following the cancellation of the series two episodes earlier, Coto stated that he considered "Demons" and "Terra Prime" to be the actual finale of the Enterprise storyline, rather than the final aired episode "These Are the Voyages..." which would be a goodbye to the franchise.

== Reception ==
"Terra Prime" was first aired in the United States on UPN on May 13, 2005. The broadcast saw the episode come in fifth place during the timeslot, with a Nielsen rating of 2.0/4. This means that it was seen by two percent of all households, and four percent of all of those watching television at the time of the broadcast. It gained higher ratings than The WB, which aired re-runs of What I Like About You and Reba, but was behind the other four major networks with a CBS special on Elvis Presley receiving ratings of 7.8/14. This was the same ratings received by "Demons", but was less than the final episode, "These Are the Voyages..." which received ratings of 2.4/4 when it was aired immediately after "Terra Prime".

Michelle Erica Green reviewed the episode for TrekNation, saying that it felt like a "real Star Trek episode", but wasn't sure about the characterization for T'Pol seen in "Terra Prime". Green would have preferred to see more of Mars, but was pleased with the glimpse of the Carl Sagan Memorial Station. She summed it up by saying that the two episodes were "no means perfect episodes, but they're reaching very earnestly for what Star Trek was in the beginning".

Jamahl Epsicokhan at his website Jammer's Reviews said that while there were plot holes in the story, and that elements were clumsy such as the showdown towards the end, the overall story was "sound". Epsicokhan said that the episode was a "much more satisfying as a send-off for the Enterprise crew" than "These Are the Voyages...". He gave "Terra Prime" a score of three out of four.

IGN gave it four out of five, and said; "In a perfect world, Enterprise would have gotten another year and could have used Terra Prime as a running subplot." While they thought that the message was heavy-handed, it was the type of story that Enterprise should have been covering all along. Andre Fisher for Empire ranked "Terra Prime" as the best episode of the series. Jay Garmon writing for TechRepublic, listed "Demons" and "Terra Prime" as the third of five best episodes of Enterprise. He thought that Peter Weller "stole the show", and that it created a "solid conclusion" to the show, despite the following episode, "These Are the Voyages..." The Hollywood Reporter rated "Demons"/"Terra Prime" the 94th best of all Star Trek episodes.

In a SyFy interview, some of the cast recommended this episode as a favorite, and suggested that the combination of "Demons" and "Terra Prime" was an alternate finale for Enterprise.

== Home media release ==
"Terra Prime" was released on home media in the United States on November 1, 2005, as part of the season four DVD box set of Enterprise. The Blu-ray edition was released on April 1, 2014.
