= Demons (Star Trek: Enterprise) =

- Star Trek: Enterprise episode
- Episode no.: Season 4 Episode 20
- Directed by: LeVar Burton
- Written by: Manny Coto
- Production code: 420
- Original air date: May 6, 2005

Guest appearances
- Harry Groener – Nathan Samuels; Eric Pierpoint – Harris; Peter Mensah – Daniel Greaves; Patrick Fischler – Mercer; Adam Clark – Josiah; Steve Rankin – Colonel Phillip Green; Johanna Watts – Gannet Brooks; Tom Bergeron – Coridan Ambassador; Peter Weller – John Frederick Paxton; Christine Romeo – Susan Khouri

Episode chronology
← Previous "In a Mirror, Darkly, Part II"	Next → "Terra Prime"
- Star Trek: Enterprise season 4

"Demons" is the twentieth episode of the fourth season of the American science fiction television series Star Trek: Enterprise, and originally aired on May 6, 2005, on UPN. The episode was written by showrunner Manny Coto and directed by LeVar Burton. "Demons" is the first part of a two part story, concluding with "Terra Prime".

Set in the 22nd century, the series follows the adventures of the first Starfleet starship Enterprise, registration NX-01. In this episode, the crew returns to Earth to participate in a conference to set up a trade coalition of alien races. While there, they discover a plot involving a xenophobic human organization called "Terra Prime".

Peter Weller, who later appeared in Star Trek Into Darkness (2013), guest-starred as John Frederick Paxton, and other guest stars included Harry Groener, who had previously appeared in episodes of both The Next Generation and Voyager. Filming of the episode overlapped with that of several other episodes, and sets included both the standing sets and an alleyway on the Paramount lot which was previously used in the Deep Space Nine episode "Little Green Men". The critical response to the episode was mostly positive with one reviewer stating that the two-part story posed similar ideological questions to those seen in The Original Series.

== Plot ==
Enterprise returns to Earth in order to attend the formation of a "Coalition of Planets". Nathan Samuels, a United Earth government minister, gives a speech, but he fails to mention the contribution they made to get the aliens to work collaboratively. A woman, later identified as Susan Khouri, staggers over to T'Pol and produces a vial containing a hair follicle, before collapsing and dying from a phaser wound. Back on board Enterprise, Doctor Phlox examines the hair's DNA, learning it is from the child of Commander T'Pol and Commander Tucker, but T'Pol denies ever being pregnant.

Captain Archer meets with Samuels, who is concerned that news of the child will stir xenophobic sentiment. Lieutenant Reed is ordered by Archer to liaise with Harris of Section 31. He is informed that Khouri was a member of Terra Prime, an anti-alien movement. Meanwhile, in the Terra Prime headquarters on the Moon, John Frederick Paxton and Doctor Mercer discuss the child. After Mercer leaves, Paxton sends for Daniel Greaves and tells him to deal with Mercer. On Earth, Archer tells Samuels that he knows that the minister was a former member of Terra Prime and convinces him to provide a case file on Khouri. Meanwhile, Ensign Mayweather gives his reporter ex-girlfriend, Gannet Brooks, a tour of the ship.

On the Moon, Paxton watches footage of Colonel Phillip Green ("The Savage Curtain"). Greaves enters and updates Paxton on the status of the child, and Paxton injects himself in the neck with an unknown substance. Phlox then reports that Khouri's body contained traces of a substance used in a zero-gravity mining facility. T'Pol and Tucker volunteer for an away mission to the Moon. Disguised as miners, they are quickly detained after Brooks apparently leaks details of the mission. Paxton reveals that the entire complex is a warp capable ship, and the vessel travels to Mars where it takes control of the verteron array, which normally protects the Earth from comets. He uses the array to fire a warning shot and issue an ultimatum — that all non-humans must immediately leave Earth.

== Production ==
=== Writing and casting ===
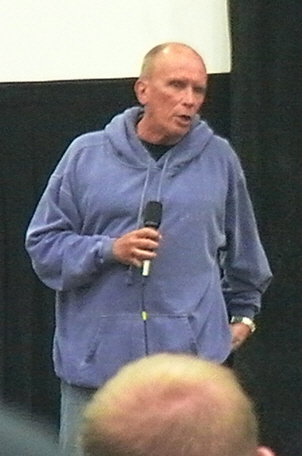
Peter Weller made his Star Trek debut in "Demons".

Showrunner and writer Manny Coto explained that the "demons" in the episode refers to the demons of intolerance that humanity must defeat before they can form the United Federation of Planets. Colonel Philip Green (the leading villain of World War III in the Star Trek universe) was originally intended to appear earlier in the season in the episode "Borderland" but the episode was instead re-written to feature Arik Soong after The Next Generation actor Brent Spiner became available; Green's appearance was one of several season four references linking Enterprise to The Original Series, including the Mirror Universe and Gorn in "In a Mirror, Darkly", Organians in "Observer Effect" and the Orions in "Borderland" and "Bound".

Peter Weller was cast in the role of John Frederick Paxton. Weller had previously appeared in other science fiction productions, including as the main character in the film RoboCop (1987). He also played Chuck Taggart in the television series Odyssey 5, which had been created by Manny Coto. Weller said of the plot of the episode: "The great thing about the whole Star Trek legacy is that they... metaphorize, they allegorize and they narrate what's going on the planet today". He would later go on to gain a role in the film Star Trek Into Darkness (2013). This was the third Star Trek appearance of Harry Groener, who played Nathan Samuels. He had previously portrayed Tam Elbrum in The Next Generation episode "Tin Man" and the Magistrate in the Voyager episode "Sacred Ground". Eric Pierpoint returned as Harris, whom he had previously played earlier in the season in the episode "Affliction". Game show host Tom Bergeron made a cameo in the episode as a Coridan Ambassador. He had previously appeared as D'Marr in the first-season episode "Oasis".

=== Filming ===
The episode was directed by former Star Trek: The Next Generation actor LeVar Burton, his second of the season, and his ninth and final for the series. Filming began on February 4, 2005, and completed on February 14. The first day of shooting overlapped with the filming for the previous episode, "In a Mirror, Darkly". The first day was spent filming scenes involving Mayweather and Brooks, while the second day overlapped with a reshoot of the conclusion of the episode "Bound" and inserts for "Affliction" and "Divergence". The following three days were spent on the standing sets such as the bridge and sickbay, before moving onto the standing cave sets on stage 9. These had previously been painted white for use in "The Aenar", and were repainted grey to represent the tunnels on the Moon for "Demons".

The only exterior location used was an alleyway on the Paramount lot near the soundstages. The alley had previously been used as a location in the Deep Space Nine episode "Little Green Men". Production moved to the Paramount Theatre on the final day of filming, which hosted the season premieres. It was used to portray the Assembly Hall of Starfleet Command. The footage of Colonel Green was shot later, with a green screen placed on the monitor during the filming with Weller.

== Reception ==
"Demons" was first aired in the United States on UPN on May 6, 2005. It received a 2/4% share among adults between the ages of 18 and 49. This means that it was seen by two percent of all households, and 4 percent of all of those watching television at the time of the broadcast. This was an increase of the overall audience share compared to the previous episode aired.

IGN gave the episodes "Demons" and "Terra Prime" a combined rating of four out of five. Michelle Erica Green at TrekNation described the episode as a "riveting hour of television". She thought that the episode posed the same types of ideological questions that The Original Series did on occasion and caused her to look forward to the following episode. Jamahl Epsicokhan at his website Jammer's Reviews gave the episode a score of three out of four, saying that it was a "pretty good story [told] in an exceptionally average way". Jay Garmon writing for TechRepublic, listed "Demons" and "Terra Prime" as the third of five best episodes of Enterprise. He thought that Peter Weller "stole the show", and that it created a "solid conclusion" to the show, despite the following episode, "These Are the Voyages..." The Hollywood Reporter said this and "Terra Prime" were the 94th best episode of all Star Trek television (over 700 episodes), noting how it had a lot of drama and praised its themes of inclusiveness and optimism.

In a SyFy interview, some of the cast recommended this episode as a favorite, and suggested that the combination of "Demons" and "Terra Prime" was an alternate finale for Enterprise.

== Home media release ==
"Demons" was released on home media in the United States on November 1, 2005, as part of the season four DVD box set of Enterprise. The Blu-ray edition was released on April 1, 2014.
