= These Are the Voyages... =

- Star Trek: Enterprise episode
- Episode no.: Season 4 Episode 22
- Directed by: Allan Kroeker
- Written by: Rick Berman; Brannon Braga
- Cinematography by: Douglas Knapp
- Production code: 422
- Original air date: May 13, 2005

Guest appearances
- Jeffrey Combs as Thy'lek Shran; Jonathan Schmock as Lead Alien; Jonathan Frakes as William Riker; Marina Sirtis as Deanna Troi; Brent Spiner as Data (voice, uncredited); Patrick Stewart as Jean-Luc Picard (voice, end sequence; uncredited); William Shatner as James T. Kirk (voice, end sequence; uncredited)

Episode chronology
← Previous "Terra Prime"	Next → —
- Star Trek: Enterprise season 4

"These Are the Voyages..." is the series finale of the American science fiction television series Star Trek: Enterprise. The 22nd episode of the fourth season and the 98th of the series overall, it first aired on UPN in the United States on May 13, 2005. It is a frame story in which the 22nd-century events of Star Trek: Enterprise are recounted in a 24th-century holodeck re-creation that is folded into the Star Trek: The Next Generation episode "The Pegasus", which aired eleven years earlier. It features guest stars Jonathan Frakes, Marina Sirtis and Jeffrey Combs, as well as a voice cameo from Brent Spiner. Series creators Rick Berman and Brannon Braga, who co-wrote the episode, conceived "These Are the Voyages..." as a valentine to Star Trek fans.

Set in the 22nd century, the series follows the adventures of the first Starfleet starship Enterprise, registration NX-01. In this episode, the story moves to the year 2370, when Commander William Riker grapples with making a difficult admission to his commanding officer about a cover-up. Riker, after consulting Counselor Deanna Troi, turns to the simulated events of the year 2161 for guidance, when the crew of Enterprise travels home to Earth for both decommissioning and the formation of the United Federation of Planets.

Reaction to "These Are the Voyages..." was negative. Critics and cast alike believed the Next Generation frame robbed the characters and their fans of closure, and that the death of Commander Trip Tucker felt forced and unnecessary. The final episode attracted 3.8 million viewers, the highest number since the previous season.

== Plot ==
In 2370, Commander William Riker, aboard Enterprise-D, is troubled by the events depicted in the Next Generation episode "The Pegasus", and seeks guidance. At Lieutenant Commander Deanna Troi's suggestion, Riker sets a holo-program to the date 2161, some six years after the events of "Terra Prime", to a time when the original Enterprise (NX-01) is due to be decommissioned after ten years of active service. The starship and its crew are also returning to Earth for the signing of the Federation Charter, and Captain Jonathan Archer frets over the speech he will give to the assembled delegates.

En route, Riker and Troi observe as Enterprise is contacted by Shran, a former Andorian Imperial Guard officer whom Archer believed to be dead. Shran is married to Jhamel ("The Aenar"), and their young daughter has been kidnapped. He asks for Archer's help in rescuing her from Rigel X. Archer decides to assist, despite Commander T'Pol's warning that they may be late returning for the ceremony. Riker joins the Enterprise crew as it assaults Shran's enemies and brings his daughter safely back. Troi also advises that Riker assume the role of ship's chef, hoping to earn the confidence of the simulated crew. As he prepares food with the crew, he learns more about their memories and impressions of Trip Tucker.

He also watches as the kidnappers board Enterprise, and how, in order to save Archer's life, Commander Tucker overloads two conduits and dies after being mortally wounded. Riker notices that Archer is troubled that he must write a speech about how worthwhile their explorations have been despite his friend's death, but T'Pol assures him Tucker would have considered it worthwhile. On Earth, Troi watches as Archer enters a crowded grand hall to give his speech and Riker joins her, now sure of what course he should take. The final shot of the episode is a montage of the ships named Enterprise: (NCC-1701-D, NCC-1701, and NX-01) as Captains Jean-Luc Picard, James T. Kirk, and Archer recite the "Where no man has gone before" prologue.

== Background ==
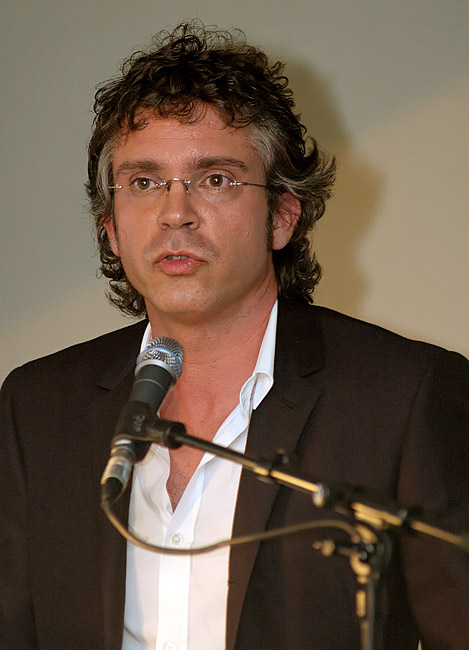
Producer Brannon Braga called "These Are the Voyages..." a "valentine" to Star Trek fans.

"Broken Bow", Enterprise's 2001 premiere episode, attracted 12.5 million viewers in its first broadcast, but ratings quickly dropped to a low of 5.9 million viewers. Enterprise was threatened with cancellation by the third season. The show survived by slashing its budget amid broadcaster UPN's schedule revamp. The show was moved to Fridays in 2004, while the rest of UPN's programming became more female-friendly, in part due to the success of America's Next Top Model. The third season introduced a season-long story arc, to some of the best reviews of the entire series. In the fourth season, Manny Coto became executive producer after writing and co-producing the show since 2003. While Coto's episodes were hailed by critics and fans as equaling the quality of previous Star Trek television series, the average viewership dropped to 2.9 million, with a series-low showing of 2.5 million in January 2005. According to Nielsen Media Research, Enterprise's final episode attracted 3.8 million viewers, an increase of 69% over the previous season's finale.

On February 3, 2005, Paramount announced that the fourth season of the show would be its last. The network waited until the series had been sold to syndication before making the announcement. The cancellation marked the first time new Star Trek episodes would not appear on television in 18 years, since Star Trek: The Next Generation premiered. The fourth season continued production so Paramount could sell an attractive 98 episodes to syndicates.

Actress Jolene Blalock (T'Pol) criticized the early stories as boring and lacking intriguing content. She felt early Enterprise scripts ignored basic tenets of Star Trek chronology, and offered "revealing costumes instead of character development". UPN executives said the male-oriented episodes of Enterprise did not mesh with the viewership of its other top shows, such as Top Model and Veronica Mars. Brannon Braga suggested the reason for cancellation was viewer fatigue, noting that "after 18 years and 624 hours of Star Trek, the audience began to have a little bit of overkill." Fans criticized Berman and Braga for ignoring Star Trek canon and refusing to fix their shows. Michael Hinman, news coordinator for SyFy Portal, said that in addition to the oversaturation of Star Trek, there "also is an oversaturation of Braga and Berman. [...] They couldn't sit back and say, 'You know, we just can't keep this fresh.' No, it was more about their stupid egos, and their nonsensical 'Even if it's broke, don't fix it' attitude." Berman noted that The Next Generation faced little competition from other science fiction shows, while Enterprise had to contend with a plethora of shows. For example, Friday viewing figures were higher for Battlestar Galactica.

== Production ==
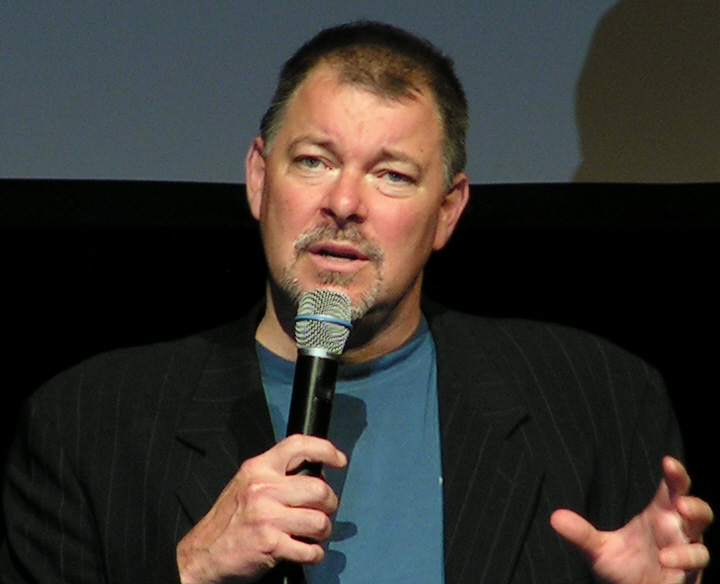
Jonathan Frakes enjoyed portraying Riker and working with Marina Sirtis again.

"These Are the Voyages..." was written by Braga and Berman, the pair's only script of the fourth season. Enterprise writer Mike Sussman told TrekNation in May 2005 that Braga had considered the idea of an episode crossover featuring characters from other Star Trek series prior to the finale. Sussman's original idea for the episode was to have The Doctor of Star Trek: Voyager treating an ill patient who may or may not have been Archer trapped in the future. Due to the subject matter, Sussman said his version would not have been suitable for the final episode. In interviews, Berman said the episode had always been intended as the season finale regardless of cancellation, and gave conflicting answers as to whether Trip would still have been killed if the show had continued.

Allan Kroeker directed the episode, his third series finale following Star Trek: Deep Space Nine's "What You Leave Behind" and Star Trek: Voyager's "Endgame". "These Are the Voyages..." featured guest appearances by Jonathan Frakes and Marina Sirtis as their Next Generation characters William Riker and Deanna Troi. Brent Spiner, another Next Generation veteran who had guest-starred earlier in the fourth season of Enterprise, had an off-screen speaking role as the android Data. Jeffrey Combs appeared as the Andorian Shran, whom Coto had wanted to be a permanent addition to the cast in the event of another season. The episode uses a framing story, so that it actually takes place in 2370 in the Star Trek universe aboard a holodeck on the Enterprise-D, specifically during the events of the Star Trek The Next Generation episode "The Pegasus".

Filming of the final episode began on Friday, February 25, after the first half of the day was spent completing "Terra Prime". Principal photography took eight days, one day longer than usual. The snowy, complex set of Rigel X, first seen in the pilot episode, was used, as was the rarely seen Enterprise galley. Enterprise-D locations such as hallways and the observation lounge were re-created. Frakes and Sirtis arrived just as a "Save Enterprise" rally was being held outside the lot. Similar to "What You Leave Behind", many of the production staff cameoed for a large crowd scene at the end of the episode, as Archer prepares to give his speech. Fifteen "VIPs", including writers Judith and Garfield Reeves-Stevens, André Bormanis, and Manny Coto joined two dozen extras in forming part of the audience. The rest of the digital set was filled by a computer-generated crowd. After their parts were finished, the final dismissal of each cast member was met with applause. Jolene Blalock and Scott Bakula were the last actors to be released, and Bakula gave a speech thanking the production crew for making the cast feel welcome. Filming ended on Tuesday, March 8, and the sets were struck. Frakes and Sirtis returned on March 9 to complete green-screen shots to be used when their characters entered or exited the holodeck. Berman would not elaborate on the episode's content before it aired, saying, "It's going to have some surprising twists and turns. It's somewhat of a valentine."

A series-ending wrap party was held for the cast and crew at the Roosevelt Hotel in April. Cast members spoke about their feelings about the end of the series. John Billingsley said the show "was a great ride, and it changed my life. It's something that will last forever for me." He was happy to say goodbye to the two-hour makeup sessions to create his character, Phlox. Many of the cast were taking a break and going on vacation before seeking new acting work. Among the notable guests were Star Trek: Nemesis screenwriter John Logan, who was not affiliated with Enterprise; and Peter Weller, who appeared as a villain in "Terra Prime".

== Reception ==
"These Are the Voyages..." was negatively received by both critics and the show's cast, with it often being compared to being an episode of Star Trek: The Next Generation.

=== Cast and crew commentary ===
Before the episode aired, Blalock called the episode "appalling." She followed up her remarks by saying she was upset over the finale being an episode of The Next Generation rather than an end for Enterprise.

Connor Trinneer, who played Commander Trip Tucker, felt the finale should have had a memorable farewell that he described as a "M*A*S*H moment", but the producers did not want such an element. Trinneer liked the finale and was satisfied by it as an actor; his character had plenty to do and he enjoyed working with Frakes. Anthony Montgomery (who played Ensign Travis Mayweather) was displeased with the finale and said: "I feel there could have been a more effective way to wrap things up for our show as well as the franchise as a whole. It just seemed to take a little bit away from what the Enterprise cast and crew worked so diligently to achieve over the past four years." While Frakes enjoyed working with Sirtis again, he said "the reality is it was a bit of a stretch to have us shut down [the Enterprise cast's] show," and that in hindsight it was a disservice to them. The early criticism forced the show's producers to hold a conference and address the issue. Braga admitted there was cast unrest, but defended the episode as a way to close not just Enterprise but Star Trek as a whole.

Berman said: "I've read a lot of the criticisms and I understand how some people feel, but [Braga] and I spent a lot of time coming up with the idea and a somewhat, I would say, unique ending to a series, especially when you're ending it prematurely. [...] You never like to disappoint people, but I think it's nonsense to say that it was more a Next Generation episode than an Enterprise episode. The only elements of [The Next Generation] that were present were there as a sounding board to allow us to look at a mission that took place six years after 'Terra Prime'." Braga later admitted that killing Tucker "wasn't a great idea", and called making the finale TNG-centric his biggest regret of the series. Coto said he liked the episode and found the script to be very moving. He said he considered the two-part story "Demons" and "Terra Prime" the quasi-finale of the season and called These Are the Voyages... "a kind of post-season episode" and actual farewell to Star Trek.

=== Critical response ===
Reviewers were also critical of the Next Generation tie-in. Sci Fi Weekly's Patrick Lee said the framing story "reduces [the Enterprise cast] to the status of lab rats." Lee further noted that even without the guest appearances, the episode did not live up to the best offerings of the season, including "In a Mirror, Darkly". National Post's Alex Strachan called the Next Generation cameos reminders of better Star Trek, compared to the "bad make-up effects, bad acting, bad music" of the latest show. Rob Salem of the Toronto Star said the cameos served no narrative purpose, and that the episode "robs [the] characters (and their fans) of any significant long-term development or satisfying sense of closure." Reviewers also criticized the episode's ending, where viewers never got to see Archer's rousing speech. IGN said the episode was "Berman and Braga's parting shot, making sure that everyone knew who was in charge," and that the sharp contrast between "These Are the Voyages..." and "Terra Prime" brought into relief the reason neither should be allowed to produce Star Trek ever again.

The death of Tucker was another point of controversy. Salem described the development as "a major character is pointlessly killed off in service of a pointless plot device," a complaint echoed by IGN. Actor Connor Trinneer, who played Trip, said during a convention appearance that the character had "gotten out of much worse scrapes than that," and the death seemed forced. The writers, Trinneer contended, wanted to kill off a character to "get the fans talking," and so Trip was killed off simply to manipulate viewers. Several critics ended their reviews by saying that whether fans would be disappointed or pleased by the episode, the majority of casual viewers would not care one way or another.

Newspapers covering Enterprise's cancellation and its final episode often said the failure of Enterprise was evidence that the franchise had moved too far from its roots and grown too dark. Andy Dehnart of MSNBC said that "while the writers and production designers deserve credit for offering worlds that were perhaps slightly more believable, they lost the fantastic, wondrous approach to space travel that The Next Generation borrowed from the original Star Trek and then perfected." USA Today's Michael Peck said that without the "dreams" of earlier series, "Star Trek becomes just another television drama." Melanie McFarland of the Seattle Post-Intelligencer, meanwhile, said the show "never found the sense of uniqueness within the Trek universe that every version that came before it possessed."

Den of Geek, while acknowledging critiques of the finale, said "These Are the Voyages..." was the tenth best episode of the series, praising the inclusion of Riker and Troi and remarking the "undeniable joy in seeing the familiar and beloved characters back on screen." Den of Geek later ranked it 6th on its list of the 15 worst episodes of all Star Trek.

WhatCulture ranked this episode the 19th worst episode of all Star Trek, CBR rated it 4th worst and ScreenRant called it the worst episode of the entire franchise to-date. CNET polled fans at the 50th anniversary Star Trek convention in Las Vegas, and "These Are the Voyages..." was voted the worst episode of all Star Trek.

== Home media release ==
The episode was released on DVD home media as part of the season four box set on November 1, 2005 in the United States. The episode was released in HD with surround sound on the Blu-ray release of the final season of Enterprise, which was made available on April 29, 2014. It was also one of three Enterprise episodes included in the DVD box set Star Trek Fan Collective - Captain's Log.
