= In a Mirror, Darkly =

- Star Trek: Enterprise episodes
- Episode nos.: Season 4 Episodes 18 and 19
- Directed by: James L. Conway (part I); Marvin V. Rush (part II)
- Written by: Michael Sussman (part I)
- Story by: Manny Coto (part II)
- Teleplay by: Michael Sussman (part II)
- Cinematography by: Douglas Knapp
- Production codes: 418 and 419
- Original air dates: April 22, 2005; April 29, 2005

Guest appearances
- Vaughn Armstrong – Captain Maximilian Forrest; Franc Ross – Grizzled Man; Caroline Bielskis – Montana Earth Woman; Gary Graham – Crewman Soval; Gregory Itzin – Admiral Black; John Mahon – Admiral Gardner; Derek Magyar – Ensign Kelby; Pat Healy - Alien Slave; Majel Barrett – Defiant Computer (voice)

Episode chronology
← Previous "Bound"	Next → "Demons"
- Star Trek: Enterprise season 4

"In a Mirror, Darkly" is collectively the eighteenth and nineteenth episodes of the fourth season of the American science fiction television series Star Trek: Enterprise, and originally aired on UPN on April 22 and 29, 2005. This installment was developed to be a sequel to The Original Series episode "The Tholian Web" and a prequel to "Mirror, Mirror". The decision to set an Enterprise episode in the mirror universe originated with a pitch to enable William Shatner to appear in the series. The teleplays for both parts of the episode were written by Mike Sussman, with Manny Coto contributing the story for the second part.

Set in the 22nd century, the series normally follows the adventures of the first Starfleet starship Enterprise, registration NX-01. However, these installments feature a mirror universe Jonathan Archer and evil counterparts of the normal characters, who serve the cruel and militaristic Terran Empire. In the first part, the ISS Enterprise learns of a Starfleet ship from the future of the main universe which is being stripped for parts by the Tholians, and seeks to take the ship from the aliens. The second part sees the surviving crew operating the USS Defiant and seeking to overthrow the Empire using its advanced weaponry.

The episode saw the reuse of footage from Star Trek: First Contact and the creation of an alternative opening credits sequence which included footage from other Paramount properties such as the film The Hunt for Red October. A three-quarters-around bridge from The Original Series era was constructed, as well as other sets from a Constitution-class starship. A Gorn and a Tholian were both created using CGI, with the Gorn using motion capture techniques. This installment also saw the return of Vaughn Armstrong as Admiral Maxwell Forrest after his main universe character was killed on screen earlier in the season in the episode "The Forge". This episode subsequently appeared in several lists of the best episodes of Star Trek: Enterprise. It was nominated for an Emmy Award for Outstanding Hairstyling for a Series in 2005.

== Plot ==
=== Part I ===
In 2063, a Vulcan ship lands on Earth, making first contact with humans (as seen in Star Trek: First Contact). Instead of peacefully greeting them, Zefram Cochrane shoots the lead Vulcan and the humans storm and loot the ship. In 2155, Doctor Phlox and Major Reed demonstrate a new torture device to Captain Forrest and Commander Archer on the ISS Enterprise. Archer suggests to Forrest they travel into Tholian space, as he has heard rumors of technology they might wish to steal. The two argue, and Forrest returns to his quarters where he is comforted by Lieutenant Sato. When he leaves, he is ambushed by Archer and several MACOs (a military team) and sent to the brig.

Archer travels to the bridge and announces that he has taken command. After torturing a Tholian pilot for coordinates, he orders a change of course to the shipyard, and tells Commander T'Pol, whom he promotes to first officer, to install a Suliban cloaking device with Commander Tucker. Archer also appoints Sergeant Mayweather as his personal guard, and Sato proposes that she keep her job as Captain's woman. Archer has Sato send a message to Starfleet about their mission to raid the Tholian technology. Tucker is injured when the cloaking device is sabotaged. Archer questions Forrest, who denies all knowledge, and Reed tortures Tucker expecting him to be the saboteur.

T'Pol leads a team to free Forrest and reclaim the ship, but Archer encrypts navigation control to prevent a course change. Forrest tortures Archer, but orders his release after he receives word that Starfleet agrees with Archer's plans. Archer shows images of an alternate universe vessel from the future named USS Defiant (a Constitution-class starship, last seen in "The Tholian Web"), that has technology and power that is a century more advanced than ISS Enterprise. On arriving at the asteroid where the Tholians are holding Defiant, Archer, T'Pol, and Tucker transport aboard, and Tucker begins powering up the vessel. Tholian ships then attack, creating an energy web around Enterprise. Forrest orders the crew to abandon ship but remains behind as the ship is destroyed.

=== Part II ===
Tholian ships create a web over the opening of the asteroid dock to prevent Defiant from leaving. T'Pol and Tucker restore power to the weapon systems, allowing Defiant to destroy enough enemy vessels to escape the trap. They recover 47 survivors from Enterprise, and Tucker is ordered to restore power to the warp drive. Sato goes to the captain's quarters and finds Archer perusing the ship's historical records, which includes parallel universe information about Starfleet, the United Federation of Planets, and their service records. Archer is surprised to learn his counterpart is an acclaimed and distinguished explorer, diplomat and politician.

Ensign Kelby is killed trying to repair the warp drive, and the crew discover, from Tholian slaves left on board, that a Gorn named Slar has sabotaged the ship. Archer, after hearing voices telling him to achieve more fame and honor, decides to lead an assault team and kills the Gorn. Tucker is able to repair the warp drive and the ship leaves to rendezvous with the ISS Avenger, arriving in time to save it from four rebel spacecraft. Avenger's commanding officer Admiral Black comes aboard for an inspection accompanied by his first officer, Soval. After Black refuses Archer's request for captaincy of the new ship, Archer disintegrates him with a phaser pistol.

Archer gives a speech to the officers of both ships, saying that they should move against Starfleet and the Empire. Soval and T'Pol meet, contemplating a future where alien species are respected and treated as equals; they convince Phlox to join their movement and sabotage Defiant. As the sole alien allowed to remain on board, he succeeds in disabling the ship's systems. Soval, on Avenger, then attacks, but Tucker disables Phlox and restores power. Defiant destroys its attacker. When Sato and Archer celebrate in the captain's quarters, Archer dies after being poisoned by Sato and we see that Mayweather is now in league with Sato. Reaching Earth on the advanced and powerful Defiant, Sato contacts Admiral Gardner, demanding his surrender and declaring herself "Empress Sato".

== Production ==
=== Writing and filming ===
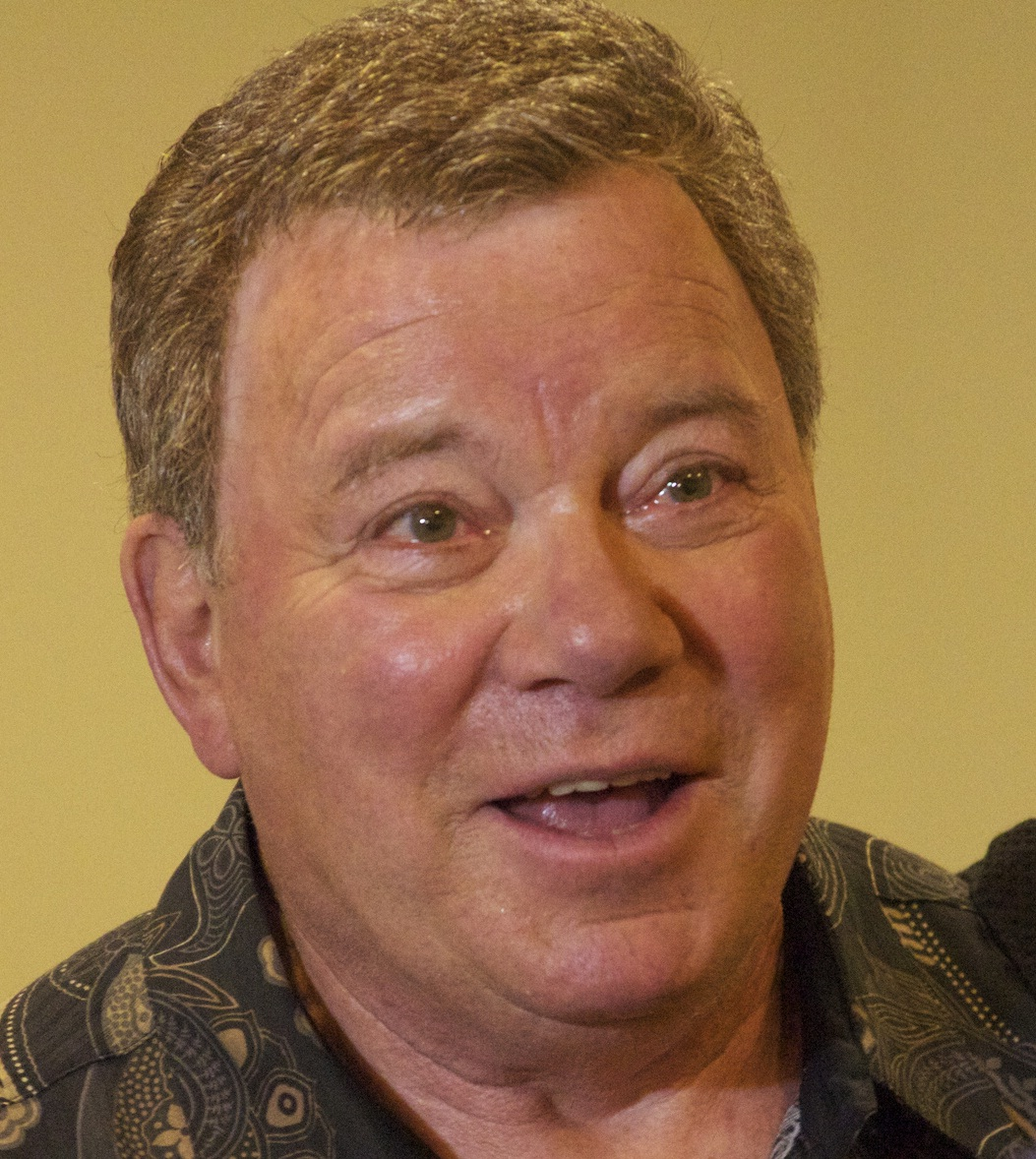
The idea to include the mirror universe in Enterprise originated from a pitch which would have featured William Shatner.

The idea of returning to the mirror universe in Enterprise was first suggested by Judith and Garfield Reeves-Stevens. In "Mirror, Mirror", the tantalus field was used on several occasions and was thought to be a disintegrator. The Reeves-Stevenses proposed that it could be explained that instead of killing its victims, the field instead transported them back through time to a penal colony in the main universe. The Enterprise would then come across the penal colony, meeting Tiberius, portrayed by William Shatner.

Tiberius would seek to use the transporter aboard the Enterprise to return to his own universe, but discovers that it has not yet diverged from the main universe and does not exist. The episode would then have explored the creation of the mirror universe through actions by Tiberius and Captain Archer. The storyline was pitched by Shatner, who had worked with the Reeves-Stevenses on the Shatnerverse series of Star Trek novels, to Manny Coto, Brannon Braga and Rick Berman. Berman had already received a pitch by Mike Sussman that would have Shatner portray an ancestor of Captain Kirk, who happened to be the chef on the Enterprise (NX-01). The three pitched the idea to Shatner, but negotiations fell through and terms were not agreed on for him to appear on the show.

Sussman began development on a script that saw the USS Defiant from "The Tholian Web" being brought back in time, instead of Tiberius. It was intended to be a sequel to that episode, as well as a prequel to "Mirror, Mirror". Sussman developed the teleplays for both parts of the episode, with Coto contributing the story for the second half. It was decided to have the entire installment in the mirror universe in order to maintain the events of "Mirror, Mirror" as being first contact between the two universes. The mirror universe features evil duplicates of the characters from the normal universe. Sussman had previously sought to use the Defiant in the second-season episode "Future Tense", but both costs and issues with the plot resulted in it being replaced with a previously unseen timeship.

Part 1 was directed by James L. Conway, who previously directed the Deep Space Nine episode "Shattered Mirror" which also made use of the Mirror Universe. Part 2 was directed by Marvin V. Rush who normally served as Director of Photography on the show, and had worked with Conway dozens of times before and was familiar with his directing style. Rush looked at what was being done in Part 1 while he was preparing the second episode, and aimed to make his episodes fit with the that and not look like it was obviously directed by someone else. On the sixth day of filming the second part of the episode, news was received that Star Trek: Enterprise had been cancelled by UPN as of the end of the season, which meant that "In a Mirror, Darkly" would be installments 94 and 95 of Enterprise's 98-episode run. "In a Mirror, Darkly" was Sussman's final contribution to the show; he had previously been a staff writer on Star Trek: Voyager and worked in the Star Trek franchise for ten years. He later described it as his favorites of the Star Trek installments that he wrote, saying that "I knew when I was writing them that they would almost certainly be the last episodes I would be writing for this particular incarnation of Star Trek, so I really treasured the experience." Part of Manny Coto's plans for season five of Enterprise would have included a return to the mirror universe crew first seen in "In a Mirror, Darkly". It would have been across four or five installments, which Coto described as a "mini-series within a series".

=== Visual effects and costuming ===
The opening sequence featured the reuse of footage from Star Trek: First Contact, where Zefram Cochrane makes first contact with the Vulcans, for which both James Cromwell and Cully Fredricksen agreed to accept Screen Actors Guild minimum salaries. Herman Zimmerman had kept the lower portion of the Vulcan vessel from that scene, and made it available to use for reshoots. While Enterprise was normally shot in digital, the mirror-First Contact scenes were shot on film so that they would match the appearance of the original footage. An alternative opening credits sequence was created, which Sussman credited Coto for. It featured footage used in other Paramount Pictures productions, including the Soviet nuclear submarine Konovalov firing a torpedo from The Hunt for Red October. Other elements include an atomic explosion, battleships, tanks and fighter jets.

Zimmerman led the construction of a full three-quarters around set to represent the bridge of the USS Defiant, which was used from the final day of filming the first part of this episode. It was the first time that a bridge set of that scale from a Constitution-class starship from The Original Series had been used since the final episode "Turnabout Intruder" was aired in 1969. Senior illustrator Doug Drexler was involved in the design; he had previously worked on the research that went into re-creating parts of The Original Series era USS Enterprise for the Star Trek: Deep Space Nine episode "Trials and Tribble-ations", as well as a set which was exhibited in Hyde Park in London. Other designers included in the creation of the set were Anna Packard, Michael Okuda and James Van Over. The actual construction of the set was in the hands of Tom Arp and his team. Sussman said of the set, "I think the bridge set is remarkable. I hope fans will be thrilled to see that set again in all of its glory. I feel that it probably looks better than the original in many respects, if you compare them side by side."

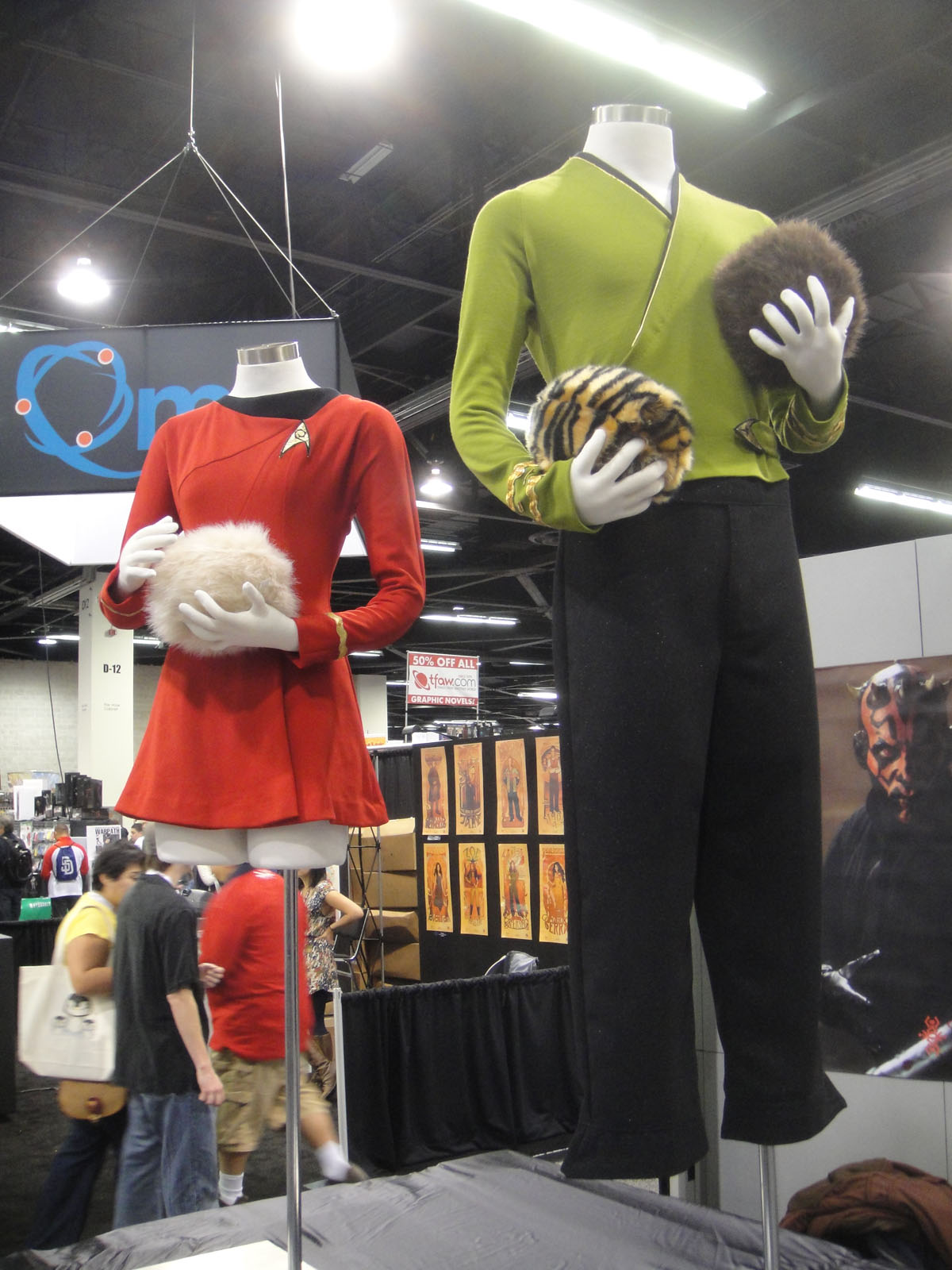
This episode saw the return of Original Series style uniforms, with the wraparound green tunic worn by Scott Bakula as Jonathan Archer.

The bridge of the Enterprise had previously been recreated twice in Star Trek series since the end of The Original Series. In the Star Trek: The Next Generation episode "Relics", only the engineering console was reconstructed, with the Captain's chair and the navigation consoles rented from a fan and the remaining consoles were edited in digitally using blue screens. Incomplete sets were also recreated for the Deep Space Nine episode "Trials and Tribble-ations", but these involved digitally inserting the actors into previous footage of The Original Series and so a full bridge set was not recreated.

Further sets for the Defiant were created for the second part of the episode, which included designs previously used in "Trials and Tribble-ations" for the Jefferies tube. The other sets included the Rec Room, Captain's quarters and the briefing room. Classic Original Series style uniforms were worn by some the main cast in the second installment; however, the production crew mistakenly gave the Defiant a unique uniform insignia different from the iconic delta (arrowhead) badge. This mistake likely stemmed from the erroneous fan theory that every starship in The Original Series had its own unique insignia. Bakula wore the wrap-around green uniform previously worn by Shatner in several episodes including "The Trouble with Tribbles", while Trinneer, Keating and Montgomery donned red shirts. Bakula joked: "Did we run out of material for Jolene's skirt?" as Blalock wore the science-blue miniskirt in the style of that worn by Christine Chapel. The normal Enterprise costumes also underwent changes, with those worn by female members of the crew having a portion removed to reveal their midriffs.

Original Series props such as phasers and PADDs were also created for the episode. Despite the mirror-Enterprise being destroyed in the first installment, during the second episode the standing sets were reused to represent the ISS Avenger. Both a Tholian and a Gorn were created in post production using CGI. The Gorn in particular required an actor in a tracking suit to allow the actors to interact with the character and give the animators something to overlay the CGI on. Stunt coordinator Vince Deadrick, Jr. wore the suit for scenes that required movement, while David Anderson wore it for static shots. Sussman also wrote biographies for Archer and Hoshi that would briefly appear on screen. Included in these were references to Archer becoming President of the Federation and that a planet called Archer IV that had previously appeared in Star Trek: The Next Generation was in fact named after him.

=== Casting ===
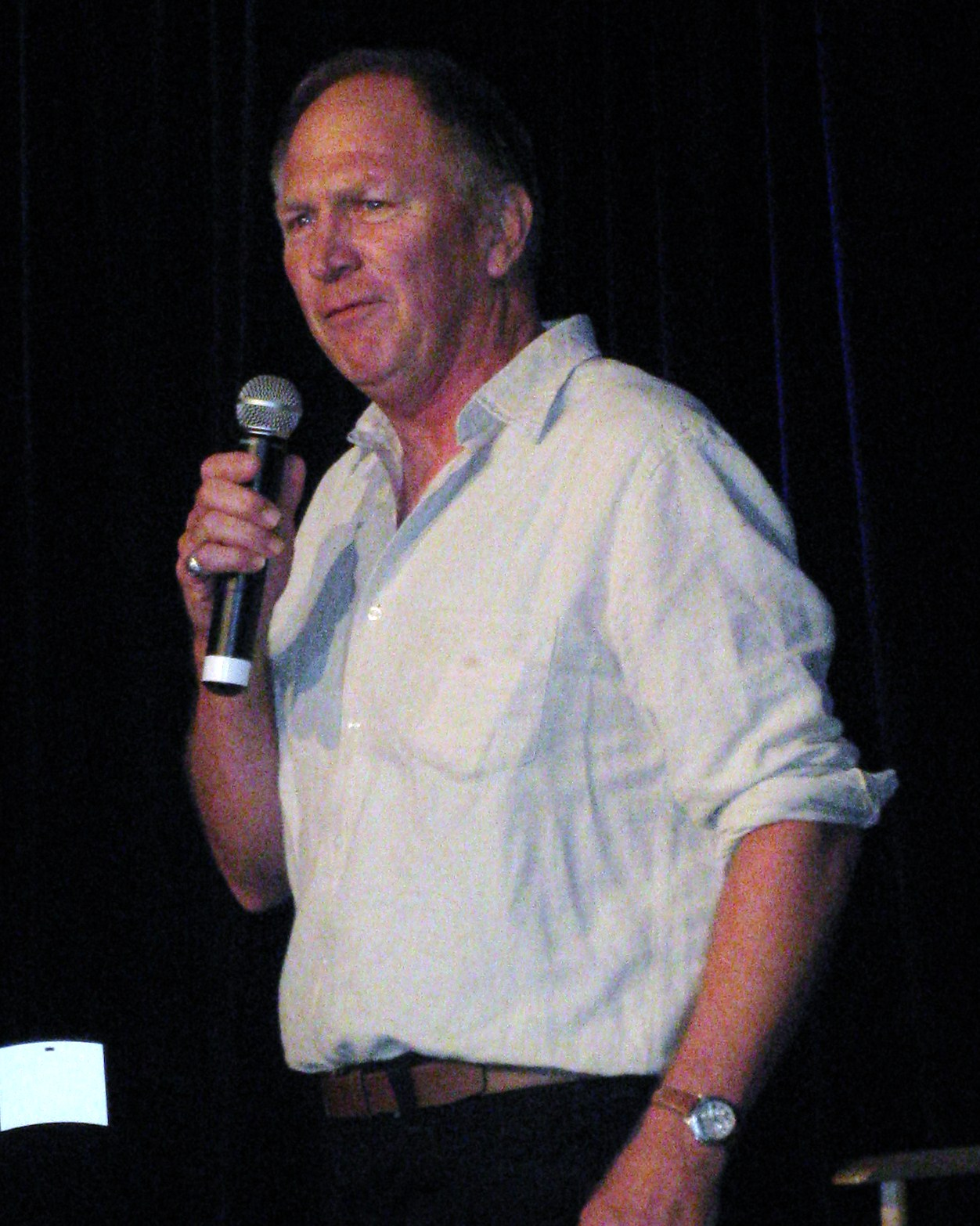
"In a Mirror, Darkly" saw the return of Vaughn Armstrong to Enterprise as the mirror universe version of his previous character.

The episode saw the return of Vaughn Armstrong as Captain Maximilian Forest. His main universe character, Rear Admiral Maxwell Forest, had been killed earlier in the season in the episode "The Forge". Both Bakula and Armstrong joked about the character suffering two deaths during the same season, although Armstrong also said of the relationship between mirror-Forrest and mirror-Hoshi that "in 25 years [of acting], I haven't gotten the girl, but I come back here and I get the girl! This is great." Gary Graham returned as the Vulcan Soval, who was a science officer aboard the Avenger in the mirror universe rather than his normal position of the Vulcan Ambassador. Graham was given a goatee beard in reference to the mirror universe Spock from "Mirror, Mirror".

Other guest stars in "In a Mirror, Darkly" included Gregory Itzin, who had previously appeared as a Vulcan commando in "Shadows of P'Jem" as well as episodes of Star Trek: Voyager and Deep Space Nine. Derek Magyar returned for his third appearance as Kelby after previously appearing in "Affliction" and "Bound". Writer Mike Sussman also appeared on screen, as one of the dead Defiant crew-members. With this episode, actress Majel Barrett, widow of Star Trek creator Gene Roddenberry, became the only actor to participate in every Star Trek series, including the animated series, as well as both the Original Series-based and Next Generation-based film series. In this episode, she provided the voice of the starship Defiant's computer. Her voice continued to be used as that of Starfleet computers after the cancellation of Enterprise in the J. J. Abrams-led Star Trek films.

These installments saw significant changes to the characters of the main cast. Linda Park, who plays Hoshi Sato in the series, later said that they were her favorite episodes of the show. She later explained: "Mirror Hoshi was strong in the way that Medea is strong, in the way that Clytemnestra is strong, in this very archetypal, warrior-woman way." She credited the role she played in this episode as demonstrating that she could play a tougher character, something which allowed her to gain other roles once the series ended.

== Reception ==
=== Ratings ===
The first part of "In a Mirror, Darkly" aired on April 22, 2005, on UPN in the United States. It was the 700th live-action Star Trek episode broadcast. It received a 2.0/3 percent share among adults between the ages of 18 and 49. This means that it was seen by two percent of all households, and three percent of all of those watching television at the time of the broadcast. This placed UPN fifth out of the major networks during the installment's hour of broadcast, ahead of The WB. This was the only time during the primetime hours that UPN placed ahead of The WB. The second part aired the following week on April 29. Ratings were similar to the first episode, with another 2.0/3 percent score, and again placing fifth during the timeslot ahead of The WB.

=== Cast commentary ===
In a 2015 SyFy article, Scott Bakula said the episode was a favorite of his. Actress Linda Park, who had a substantial role in the two-parter, has said, "I think it’s well known that those are my favorite episodes." However, Connor Trinneer and John Billingsley were more critical; Trinneer described them as "pandering," while Billingsley said they were "all effect and no point" and "a little too meta." Their fellow cast member Dominic Keating disagreed, calling the two-parter "good fun."

=== Critical response ===
David Bianculli of the New York Daily News called the episodes "the best hours of Enterprise yet." He wrote, "The biggest treat of this episode, though, is its ability to surprise - and to do so with not only a sense of Trek history, but with a sense of humor." Bianculli added that "by taking a walk on the wild side, Enterprise is being very good by letting its characters be very bad." He rated the episode three-and-a-half out of four stars, and said that it was so much fun that "had they adopted this attitude from the start, Enterprise probably would still be flying missions next season."

IGN gave the combined double episode a rating of five out of five, and said it "may be a gimmick episode, but it's a gimmick that works nearly flawlessly and shouldn't be missed." Reviewing the first part for TrekNation, Michelle Erica Green said that her favorite part was the modified opening sequence, and described it as "fun and lighthearted in a twisted sort of way" but thought that the closing episodes of the series would have been better if they had concentrated on the real crew and ship. She thought that the second installment saw the series "stretching a clever idea too thin", and that a "one-hour 'Mirror' would have made more sense in terms of the pacing and for Enterprise as a whole."

Jamahl Epsicokhan at his website Jammer's Reviews gave the first episode a score of three out of four, and the second part two and a half. Epsicokhan described it as an "evil comic book", and regarding the first part, "To call this episode over-the-top would be an understatement. This is a go-for-broke hour of lunatic madness." His view on the second part was that the re-created sets were impressive, but "it goes so far over the top that it comes back around and kicks itself in its own ass. It's overplayed, overacted, and over-goofy."

Den of Geek ranked it the number one episode of the series, writing that the installment "manages to include some of Enterprise's most inventive moments, not least the revised opening credits." Jay Garmon at TechRepublic ranked it as the fifth best episode, saying that the writers managed to include a "gleefully malicious and fatal series of unexpected double-crosses, but also work in some of the most satisfying and coherent mythology gags that Enterprise ever displayed". In a list of the top 100 episodes of the Star Trek franchise, "In a Mirror, Darkly" was placed in 40th place by Charlie Jane Anders at io9. The editors of Newsweek's Star Trek 50th Anniversary issue wrote that the episodes "often earns Trekker adulation," and listed them first among Enterprise's "Top 10" episodes; The Hollywood Reporter rated "In A Mirror, Darkly" the 88th best episode of all Star Trek episodes. Empire ranked the episodes 46th out of the "50 Best Star Trek episodes ever," and the second best installment of Enterprise after "Terra Prime." Wired also picked "In a Mirror, Darkly" as the best of Enterprise's entire run. SyFy ranked the two-part story fifth out of the seven Star Trek Mirror Universe episodes produced as of that date. That same year, Vulture wrote: "The series took a long time to find its feet, only hitting its stride in its final season with episodes like the two-part “In a Mirror, Darkly.”

Fans at the 50th anniversary convention in Las Vegas chose the two-parter as one of the "Ten Best Star Trek Episodes" of all time, out of more than seven hundred live-action installments produced as of that date.

=== Awards and nominations ===
Laura Connolly, Roma Goddard and Michael Moore were nominated for an Emmy Award for Outstanding Hairstyling For A Series for their work on this episode.

== Home media release ==
"In a Mirror, Darkly" was first released for home viewing as part of the Star Trek: Enterprise series four box set. It was released on region one DVD in the United States on November 1, 2005. The set included a fifteen-minute-long documentary on the origins of the episode and background to the mirror universe in general as well as audio commentary from Mike Sussman and Tim Gaskill on both parts of the episode. The commentary had previously been released on the official Star Trek website, where Gaskill is the editorial director. It subsequently became one of three Enterprise episodes to be included in the Star Trek: Alternative Realities Collective DVD set which was released in 2009. The other episodes were "E²" and "Twilight", and also featured were other mirror universe installments including "Mirror, Mirror" and three of those from Deep Space Nine. The Blu-ray edition was released on April 1, 2014.
