= Similitude (disambiguation) =

Similitude is a concept applicable to the testing of engineering models.

Similitude may also refer to:

- "Similitude" (Star Trek: Enterprise), an episode from the television series Star Trek: Enterprise
- Similarity (geometry)
