= Marvin V. Rush =

American cinematographer and director

Marvin V. Rush A.S.C. is a director of photography, cinematographer, television director and a camera operator. He is perhaps best known for his work on the Star Trek franchise.

He was nominated twice for an Emmy Award in his cinematography work: in 1991 for the Star Trek: The Next Generation episode "Family" and in 1995 for the Star Trek: Voyager episode "Heroes and Demons".

== Camera operator ==
- E. Nick: A Legend in His Own Mind (1984), second unit camera operator

== Cinematographer ==
- Easy Street (1986–1987)
- Meet the Hollowheads (1989)
- Star Trek: The Next Generation (director of photography) (as Marvin Rush) (1989–1993)
- Star Trek: Deep Space Nine (1993–94)
- Star Trek: Voyager (1995–2001)
- Star Trek: Borg (1996)
- Archibald the Rainbow Painter (1998)
- Star Trek: Enterprise (2001–2005}
- E-Ring (2006)
- Hell on Wheels (2011–2016)

== Director ==
- Star Trek: The Next Generation
  - The Host
- Star Trek: Voyager
  - Favorite Son
  - The Thaw
- Star Trek: Enterprise
  - In a Mirror, Darkly, Part II
  - Terra Prime

== Namesake ==
- Rush dilithium crystals were named after him
