= Similitude (Star Trek: Enterprise) =

- Star Trek: Enterprise episode
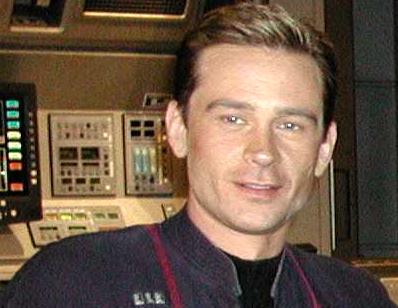
- Episode no.: Season 3 Episode 10
- Directed by: LeVar Burton
- Written by: Manny Coto
- Production code: 310
- Original air date: November 19, 2003

Guest appearances
- Maximillian Orion Kesmodel - Sim-Trip at 4; Adam Taylor Gordon - Sim-Trip at 8; Shane Sweet - Sim-Trip at 17

Episode chronology
← Previous "North Star"	Next → "Carpenter Street"
- Star Trek: Enterprise season 3

"Similitude" is the tenth episode from the third season of the science fiction television series Star Trek: Enterprise. It first aired on UPN on November 19, 2003 and was the 62nd episode in the series. Captain Archer orders a short-lived clone of Trip Tucker to be made to save Tucker's life. This episode won an Emmy for musical composition.

When the series was reappraised ten years after its initial broadcast, "Similitude" (along with "Dear Doctor") was noted by some reviewers as one of the most thought provoking episodes of Enterprise. In particular, they cited the examination of ethics on Enterprise, especially the questionable decisions Archer makes in Season 3.

== Plot ==
Commander Trip Tucker, while endeavoring to increase the stable speed of Enterprise to Warp 5, becomes comatose when the engines destabilize and explode. Doctor Phlox suggests a radical and controversial procedure to save him: growing a mimetic symbiote as a neurological donor. Archer, concerned with the overarching goal of their mission, authorizes the procedure. The symbiote, with a natural lifespan of two weeks, is then injected with Tucker's blood and is soon born. Phlox names him Sim, and as he develops rapidly, Tucker's memories and personality begin to express themselves, including an interest in engineering, and a romantic attraction to Sub-Commander T'Pol.

The window of time approaches when Phlox must perform the transplant—which, it turns out, will be fatal to Sim. Sim, having now "met himself" in Sick Bay, reveals knowledge of an experimental procedure that might allow for a significant extension of his lifespan. Archer learns that Phlox knew of this procedure, but concealed his knowledge due to its highly experimental and poorly researched nature. Sim expresses a strong desire to live—Tucker's own life notwithstanding—through the rest of his natural life. Later, a tired-looking Archer, angered at finding Sim in Tucker's quarters, states he would rather Sim voluntarily submit to the fatal procedure than be forced to do so.

Sim planned an escape but resigned himself to the transplant, after contemplating the death of his sister due to the Xindi attack on Earth. He realizes his and the crew's options are limited. Before leaving for Sick Bay, T'Pol arrives and gives him a kiss. Sim thanks Phlox for being a good father to him. With the medical procedure successful, Archer honors his sacrifice in the presence of the crew, including Trip. The episode begins and ends with the funeral and burial of Sim in space.

== Production ==
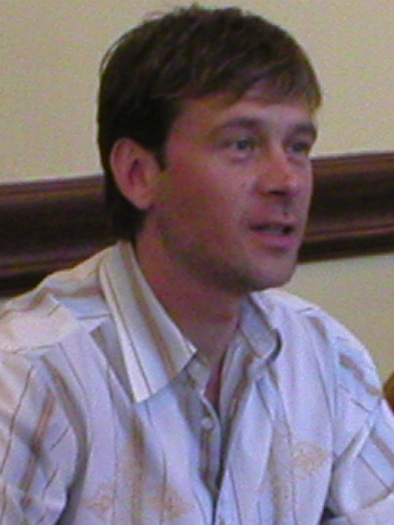
Connor Trineer, who plays the dual roles of Commander Tucker and the adult version of Sim, his clone

This was the first episode written by Manny Coto. Coto was the creator of the science fiction series Odyssey 5. Scott Bakula called it "one of our best scripts in three years." Coto was proud of the episode, and thought it was a good story premise: "It's actually the question of, 'What if an individual can be grown in seven days? And what if that individual could then be harvested to help another individual?' I thought it presented a fascinating dilemma and a great opportunity for drama."

The episode is a bottle show set on the ship, using only existing sets, although it does feature guest cast portraying the younger versions of Commander Tucker. The newborn clone "Sim" was played by a set of eight-week-old triplets, and the eight-month-old baby was portrayed by twins. Maximillian Kesmodel was the four-year-old and Shane Sweet played the seventeen-year-old Tucker. Adam Taylor Gordon, who previously played young Trip in The Xindi, returned as eight-year old-Sim, working for four of the seven days of production.

"Similitude" is the sixth Enterprise episode directed by LeVar Burton.

== Reception ==
The episode first aired on UPN on November 19, 2003. It saw increased Nielsen ratings earning a 3.0/5 total rating share. This means that approximately 3% of American households were tuned to UPN, while "North Star" was viewed by 5% of households at the time. This translated to an average audience of 4.59 million viewers, the most viewers the show had achieved for an episode since Future Tense in February 2003.

Herc of Ain't It Cool News gave the episode 3.5 out of 5. He praised the casting of the various versions of Trip, the "intellectual and, yes, emotional journey" of T'Pol, and appreciated the emphasis on "solidly paced, thought-provoking science fiction" although he was critical of the contrived circumstances needed to set up the moral dilemma. Michelle Erica Green of TrekNation thought the ending was a cop out, and that like the Voyager episode Tuvix, the character being murdered was "far more than the sum of his parts". She continued "I didn't have to feel this way, because it's not only a question of ethics but a question of plot holes" and she thought it would have been better if Sim had taken Tucker's place.

Den of Geek ranked this the ninth best episode of this television series. TechRepublic included the episode on its list of the 5 best episodes of Enterprise. The A.V. Club include this episode on their list of 10 episodes that best represented the series, and called it a "contender for the best episode of Enterprise". Vulture listed this episode as one of the best of Star Trek: Enterprise. Vox listed it as one of the 25 essential episodes of Star Trek.

John Billingsley said "Similitude" was probably the best episode of the series, for several reasons: "Everyone in the cast was involved and everyone had an emotional through-line. Some episodes, of any show, actors are used to convey information or they’re shunted aside. That episode, I thought it was the best of our ensemble pieces and it did what Star Trek does best, which is to deal with a topical question that has some sociological significance in a way that brings humanist values into play."

The Hollywood Reporter interviewed various cast and production crew of the Star Trek franchise to determine the "100 Greatest Episodes" from across the five series, and rated "Similitude" the 85th best episode of all Star Trek episodes.

=== Awards ===
Composer Velton Ray Bunch won an Emmy for musical composition, for this episode. Bunch had previously received two Emmy nominations, for the television series Quantum Leap and the television film Papa's Angels both featuring Scott Bakula, and in his acknowledgments Bunch thanked Bakula "who has been a fan and so loyal to me over the years."

== See also ==
- "Tuvix" (VOY S2E24, airdate May 6, 1996; another episode with the Trolley Problem)
- "The Child" (TNG S2E01, air date Nov 21, 1988; another episode with a rapidly aging child)
