= Bound (Star Trek: Enterprise) =

- Star Trek: Enterprise episode
- Episode no.: Season 4 Episode 17
- Directed by: Allan Kroeker
- Written by: Manny Coto
- Production code: 417
- Original air date: April 15, 2005

Guest appearances
- William Lucking – Harrad-Sar; Cyia Batten – Navaar; Derek Magyar – Commander Kelby; Crystal Allen – D'Nesh; Menina Fortunato – Maras

Episode chronology
← Previous "Divergence"	Next → "In a Mirror, Darkly"
- Star Trek: Enterprise season 4

"Bound" is the seventeenth episode of the fourth season of the American science fiction television series Star Trek: Enterprise, originally broadcast on UPN on April 15, 2005. It was written by showrunner Manny Coto, and directed by Allan Kroeker. The episode featured the return of the Orion slave girls, which had been originally seen in the original pilot of Star Trek: The Original Series, "The Cage".

Set in the 22nd century, the series follows the adventures of the first Starfleet starship Enterprise, registration NX-01. In this episode, three Orion slave girls come on board the ship, and the crew, with the exception of Commander "Trip" Tucker and Commander T'Pol who seem to have a resistant psychic bond, begin acting strangely.

The episode featured the return of Cyia Batten and William Lucking who had both previously appeared in multi-episode parts in Star Trek: Deep Space Nine. Four time MTV Music Video Award for Choreography winner Travis Payne was brought on board to oversee the extensive choreography for the three actresses playing the Orion women. Each actress went through a four to five-hour make-up process for each day of filming, which required them to be sprayed green. "Bound" received Nielsen ratings of 1.8/3%, and critical reaction was mixed with one reviewer listing it amongst the best episodes of Enterprise while another listed as the worst episode ever of any Star Trek series.

== Plot ==
Enterprise is en route to the Berengarius system, one of the proposed locations for a Starfleet starbase, when it is approached by an Orion Syndicate vessel. Captain Archer is invited to visit the Orion ship by its captain, Harrad-Sar. During the visit, Archer and Lieutenant Reed are entertained by three Orion dancers, Navaar, D'Nesh, and Maras. Archer negotiates with Harrad-Sar and they agree to a joint magnesite mining operation, and at Harrad-Sar's insistence the three slaves are given to him. They return to Enterprise with the slaves and set a course to survey the planet.

En route, the presence of the Orions begins having an effect on the crew: men become increasingly aggressive, while women increasingly suffer from headaches. Navaar focuses her attentions on Archer, while D'Nesh seduces Commander Kelby. Arriving at the planet, a sluggish Archer orders Reed to destroy another ship, but he refuses and it escapes. Kelby meanwhile sabotages the warp drive before Commander Tucker can physically stop him. Afterwards, Doctor Phlox determines that the Orions are producing pheromones, causing the crew's adrenaline levels to spike. Only Commander T'Pol and Tucker remain unaffected, since she is Vulcan and he shares her immunity because of their psychic bond.

The Orions are placed under guard in the decontamination chamber. Harrad-Sar returns in his vessel and attacks the now disabled Enterprise, and then begins to tow it away. He reveals that, in fact, the Syndicate seeks Archer's head, and in this matter he is the slave and the Orion women are his masters. The Orions escape and travel to the Bridge, as do T'Pol and Tucker. Navaar tells Archer to arrest T'Pol, but Tucker stuns all the male crew-members with his phaser, and Tucker and T'Pol disable the Orion ship with a pulse sent from Enterprise's deflector dish. They send the Orions back to their ship, and T'Pol finally admits she would personally like Tucker to return, and he replies that he has already requested a transfer back to Enterprise.

== Production ==
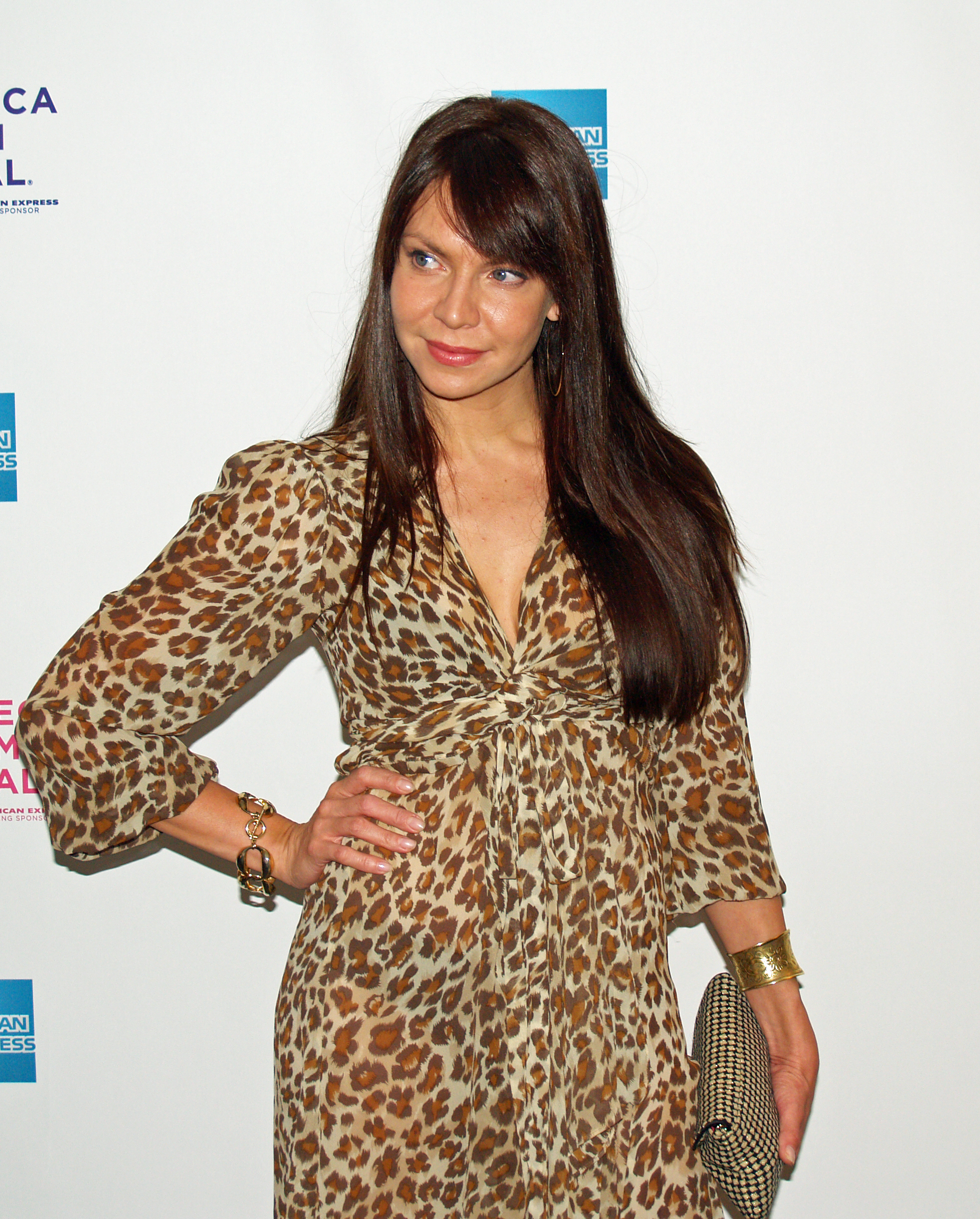
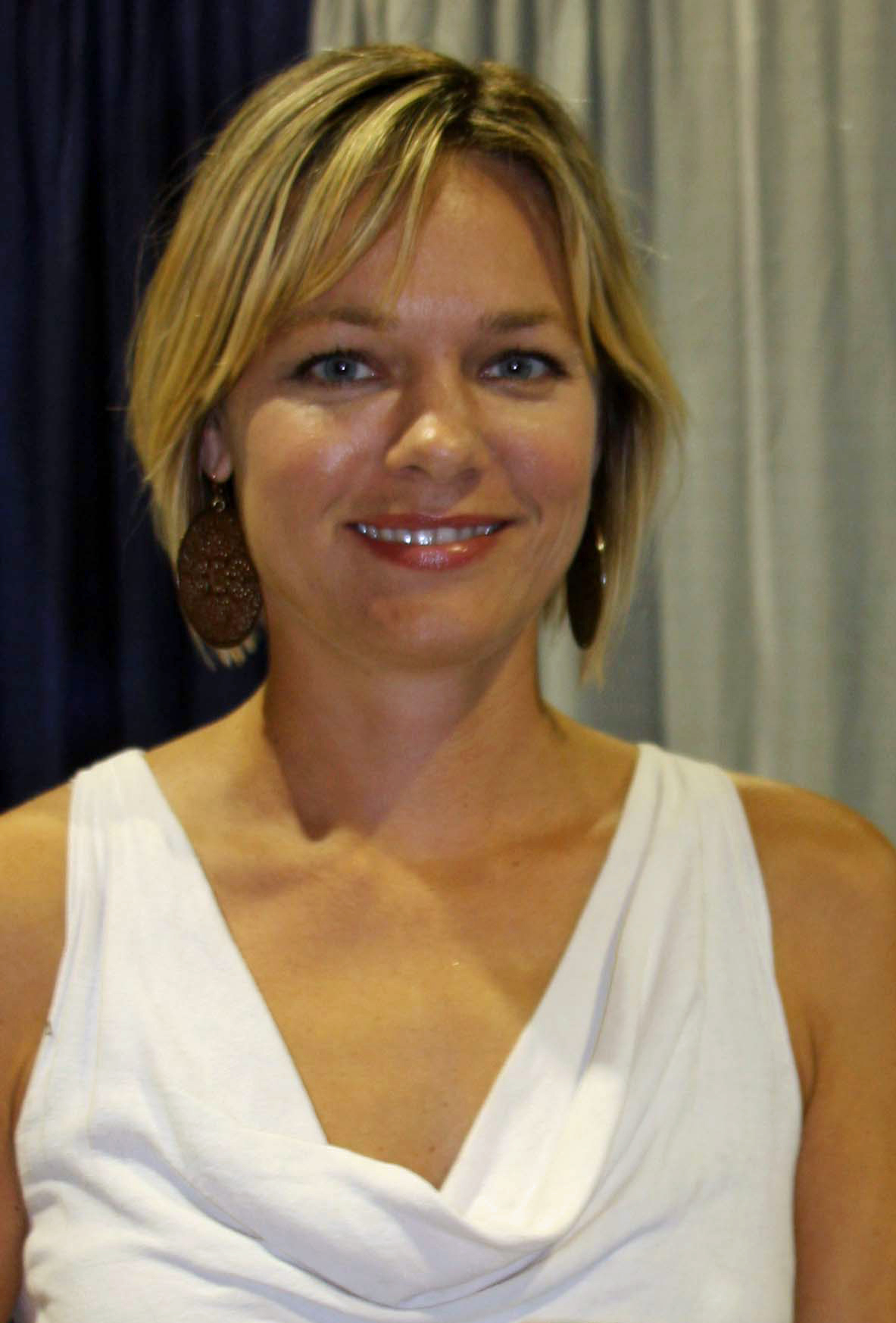
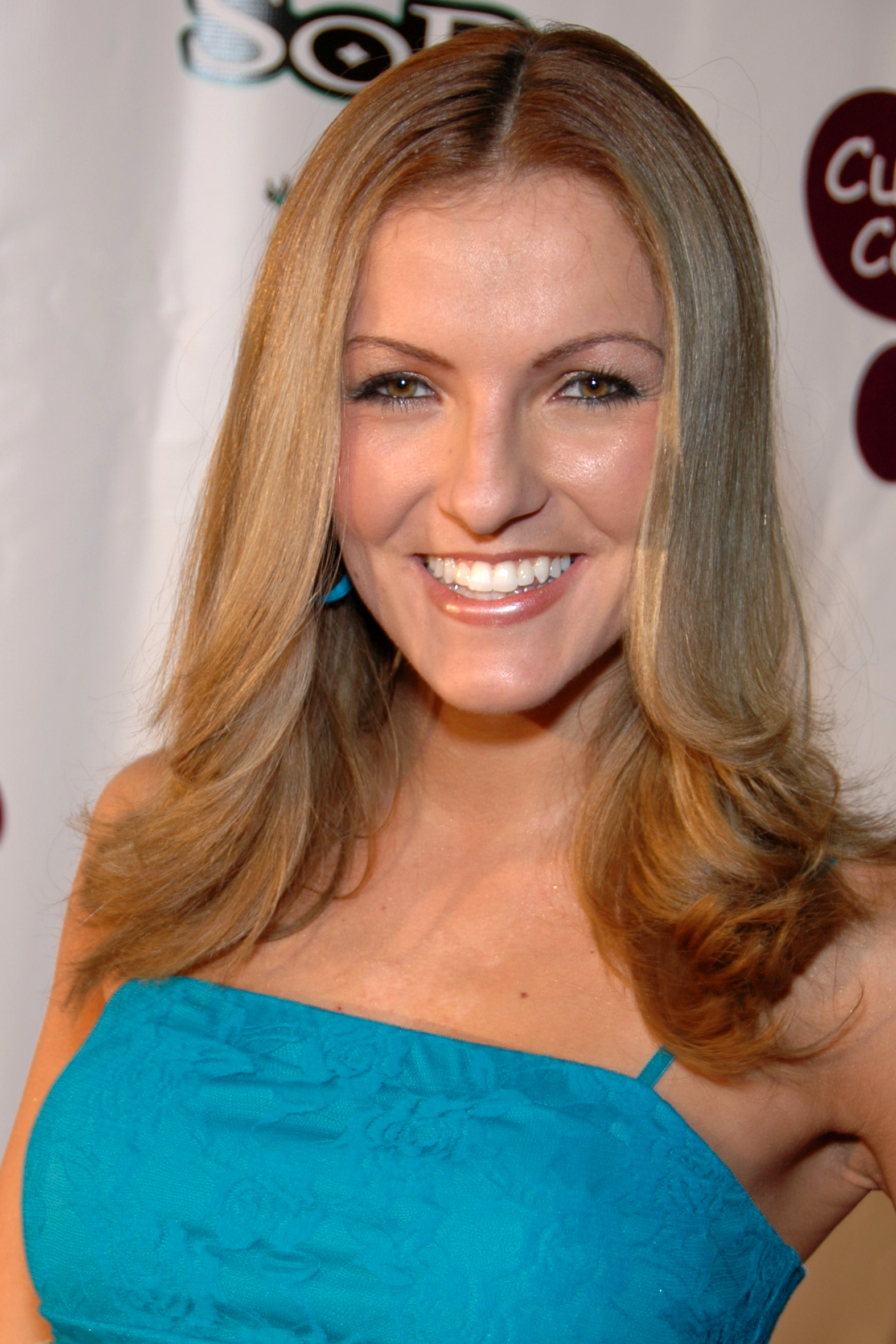
Cyia Batten, Crystal Allen and Menina Fortunato portrayed the three Orion slave girls in "Bound"

The Orion slave girls had been introduced in the original Star Trek: The Original Series pilot "The Cage", footage from which was later adapted to appear in the episode "The Menagerie". The make-up was designed by Fred Phillips, which was originally tested on Majel Barrett, before it was applied to Susan Oliver. Cyia Batten, Crystal Allen and Menina Fortunato played the three Orion women in "Bound". Batten had previously appeared as Tora Ziyal, the daughter of Gul Dukat in Star Trek: Deep Space Nine in the episodes "Indiscretion" and "Return to Grace". She also appeared in "Drive", an episode Star Trek: Voyager, as Irina. William Lucking had appeared as a Bajoran called Furel in three episodes of Deep Space Nine; "Shakaar", "The Darkness and the Light" and "Ties of Blood and Water". Derek Magyar returned as Commander Kelby, following his introduction earlier in the previous episode "Divergence".

Allen recalled The Original Series, and said that she was pleased to be remembered as an Orion slave girl in Enterprise. However, she was not pleased with the make-up process, which took between four and five hours to apply, and required each actress to be sprayed with green make-up over her whole body. Removal of the makeup was via the showers in the Paramount lot's executive gym. The make-up team also needed to apply fake sweat and bruises to other members of the cast to represent the results of the increased aggression shown by them in the episode's plot.

Allan Kroeker, the director of "Bound", had previously directed two episodes earlier in the season, "Storm Front" and "Home". Fortunato praised the director and described the Orions, saying that they "move very slowly, very seductively. I would like to compare us to snakes – we like to slither and creep around, versus a human. So we’re a little sneaky. The three of us are trying to get something accomplished, and each one of us has our target, so to speak, to try to manipulate them to get what we want in the end."

The choreography was overseen by Travis Payne, who had won the MTV Music Video Award for Best Choreography on four occasions and worked with Madonna, Michael Jackson and Britney Spears amongst others. Both Batten and Fortunato were trained dancers, with Batten being a former member of The Pussycat Dolls burlesque dance troupe, while Allen had previously appeared in films such as Maid in Manhattan and television series such as Boston Legal alongside William Shatner. After being cast, Fortunato said that the actresses playing the Orion women were not shown any film footage of the previous appearances of Orion slave girls, but were allowed to see a magazine article about Bobbi Sue Luther appearing as one in the episode "Borderland" in order to demonstrate what the make-up would look like.

Filming began on January 6, 2005 and concluded on January 14. Only six days were used to shoot, with January 10 spent working on choreography for the dance scene and for shooting additional footage for "Divergence". Filming on the earlier episode had also overlapped on the first day of filming. While the actresses playing the Orion women were required on all days, Lucking filmed all his scenes on the final day of shooting. The main cabin of the Orion ship was constructed in full specifically for this episode while the bridge was only a single wall as it was only seen on screen as a viewscreen background.

== Reception ==
"Bound" was first aired in the United States on UPN on April 15, 2005. It received a 1.8/3% share among adults between the ages of 18 and 49. This means that it was seen by 1.8 percent of all households, and three percent of all of those watching television at the time of the broadcast. This was lower than the following episode, where the first installment of the two-part "In a Mirror, Darkly" received ratings of 2.0/3%.

IGN gave the episode three out of five, and said that although it wasn't the best episode, it was moving the series in the right direction, and called it "a decent hour of action-adventure science fiction." Jason Davis of Cinescape gave it a B+ and said "Coto has crafted a script that evokes the ambience of the original while spinning a yarn that keeps even the most ensconced Trek aficionado in suspense." He concludes: "This episode, not to mention this season, is what Enterprise should have been all along." Jamahl Epsicokhan on his website Jammer's Reviews gave "Bound" a score of one out of four, saying that it was "too dumb, too obvious, too boring, and too rooted in gender stereotypes". He said that it was sexist and "the worst episode of Enterprise in more than two years". Michelle Erica Green of TrekNation said that it was the single worst episode of any Star Trek series, including "Spock's Brain". She considered it a statement in misogyny and also thought that it represented a scenario where homosexual characters do not exist. James Hunt of the website Den of Geek listed "Bound" as the fourth best episode of Enterprise, saying that it "found a way to include [the Orion slave girls] in a way that preserved the eye candy and shifted the power in the Orion relationships."

== Home media release ==
"Bound" was released on home media in the United States on November 1, 2005, as part of the season four DVD box set of Enterprise. The Blu-ray edition was released on April 1, 2014.
