= The Pegasus (Star Trek: The Next Generation) =

- Star Trek: The Next Generation episode
- The remains of the Pegasus are discovered.
- Episode no.: Season 7 Episode 12
- Directed by: LeVar Burton
- Written by: Ronald D. Moore
- Cinematography by: Jonathan West
- Production code: 264
- Original air date: January 10, 1994

Guest appearances
- Terry O'Quinn - Adm. Erik Pressman; Nancy Vawter - Adm. Margaret Blackwell; Michael Mack - Sirol

Episode chronology
← Previous "Parallels"	Next → "Homeward"
- Star Trek: The Next Generation season 7

"The Pegasus" is the 164th episode of the syndicated American science fiction television series Star Trek: The Next Generation, the 12th episode of the seventh season. It was written by Ronald D. Moore and directed by series cast member LeVar Burton.

Set in the 24th century, the series follows the adventures of the crew of the Federation starship USS Enterprise-D. In this episode, the Enterprise attempts to locate the Pegasus, a Federation starship that contained experimental technology of vital strategic importance, a Federation cloaking device, and was also the first starship posting of Enterprise first officer Commander William Riker (Jonathan Frakes) when he left Starfleet Academy.

== Plot ==
The Enterprise is ordered on a priority mission to collect a member of Starfleet Intelligence: Admiral Erik Pressman (Terry O'Quinn), former Captain of the USS Pegasus, where Will Riker (Jonathan Frakes) first served after graduating from Starfleet Academy. Pressman informs Captain Jean-Luc Picard (Patrick Stewart) and Riker that intelligence has located the Pegasus in the Devolin system near the Romulan Neutral Zone. Though it is presumed destroyed, Pressman orders the Enterprise to either recover or destroy the ship in order to prevent its capture by the Romulans. In private, Riker attempts to discuss the events aboard the Pegasus's last mission and questions Pressman's intentions, but Pressman instructs Riker to remain silent until the mission is completed.

In the Devolin system, the Enterprise encounters a Romulan Warbird, clearly searching for the Pegasus as well. Picard and Sirol (Michael Mack), the Romulan commander, acknowledge each other's presence, creating a tense situation. Though the Enterprise sensors locate the Pegasus buried in a large fissure in an asteroid, Picard orders them to move on to lure the Romulans away.

Picard asks Riker privately about the Pegasus. Prior to the assumed destruction of the vessel, there was a mutiny. Riker says that when the Pegasus' warp core overloaded, several officers took up arms against Pressman, fearful that the Captain was out of control. Riker went to his Captain's defense, Pressmen and Riker then left the ship using the escape pods. Shortly after they ejected from the ship, an explosion occurred. Picard reads a portion of the Judge Advocate General's report suggesting that the surviving officers and crew were involved in a cover-up and further investigation is warranted. Picard informs Riker that the aforementioned investigation never happened and that the report was buried by Starfleet Intelligence. Riker informs Picard that he is under Pressman's orders not to discuss the matter. Picard acknowledges that since, as a captain, he cannot order Riker to disobey an admiral's orders, he will have to trust Riker to not let Pressman put the Enterprise at unnecessary risk. With the Romulans distracted, the Enterprise returns to the asteroid. Pressman orders the Enterprise to enter a fissure in the asteroid, over Picard's objections. Once inside, they discover that the Pegasus is partially fused with the asteroid. Picard and Riker speculate as to whether there are any crew members trapped in the blocked part of the ship. Pressman and Riker transport to the Pegasus and recover an experimental device with which the ship was equipped. Pressman is elated to find it, but Riker is less enthusiastic. They return to the Enterprise when they learn the Romulans have closed the fissure, trapping the Enterprise inside.

Sirol diplomatically apologizes for "accidentally" closing the fissure and gives Picard and his crew the option of taking asylum aboard the Warbird, which would allow both the Enterprise and the Pegasus to be captured by the Romulans. Riker proposes using the device they took from the Pegasus—a prototype for a Federation cloaking device. The device is phase-shifting and as such it would allow the Enterprise to travel through the solid matter of the asteroid and escape. Pressman is furious at the breaking of Riker's silence, but Picard rebukes Pressman, pointing out that the development of a cloaking device by the Federation is a violation of the Treaty of Algeron. Pressman attempts to take command of the Enterprise, but the crew refuses to obey his orders. Picard orders the cloaking device to be installed on the Enterprise and is used to escape the asteroid. The cloak is then dropped in full view of the Romulan ship against Pressman's protestations, and Picard informs Sirol that the Federation will be contacting the Romulan government about the incident.

Picard orders Pressman to be arrested for violating the Treaty of Algeron. Riker insists that he be arrested as well, and Picard reluctantly agrees.

Visiting Riker in the brig, Picard informs Riker that Pressman and four other high-ranking officers in Starfleet Intelligence have been arrested pending a court-martial. He notes that Riker's record will be affected by this incident. Picard tells Riker that while he did conceal the truth of Pressman's illegal activities, he eventually stood up and told the truth, and as long as Riker still has the integrity to do so, he will still be proud to have him as a First Officer.

== Production ==
The visual effects shot of the USS Pegasus spacecraft was a re-dress of the Oberth-class model. The VFX model was auctioned off in 2006 by Christie's. The Oberth-class was designed by David Carson, and built at Industrial Light & Magic. The model was made for the 1984 theatrical film Star Trek III: The Search for Spock, where it depicted a ship called the "USS Grissom".

This episode was directed by LeVar Burton who had previously directed "Second Chances". He went on to direct 28 television episodes in the Star Trek franchise.

== Reception ==
Gizmodo ranked "The Pegasus" as the 55th out of 100 of the best of all Star Trek television episodes in 2014.

The Hollywood Reporter ranked "The Pegasus" as the 20th best episode of Star Trek: The Next Generation, noting the performance of guest star Terry O'Quinn and the moral complexity of the situations faced by Commander Riker.

In 2020, Vulture recommended this as one of the best Star Treks to watch along with Star Trek: Picard, noting how Riker struggles as he has an encounter with one of his previous captains. They point out that this is the episode that features "Captain Picard Day", which is referenced in later Star Trek series.

== See also ==
- Philadelphia Experiment — an urban legend about an experimental ship with the ability to become invisible, at the cost of crew members becoming fused with parts of it
- K-129 — a real-life case of recovering a lost military vessel under secrecy during the Cold War
- "The Next Phase" - A fifth season episode involving a Romulan attempt at creating a phase-shifting cloaking device
- "These Are the Voyages..." - The Star Trek: Enterprise series finale, set during the events of this episode, where Riker visits the holodeck and turns to the events of the 22nd century for guidance.
- Star Trek The Next Generation DVD set, volume 7, disc 3, selection 4
