= Manny Coto =

American director, producer and writer (1961–2023)

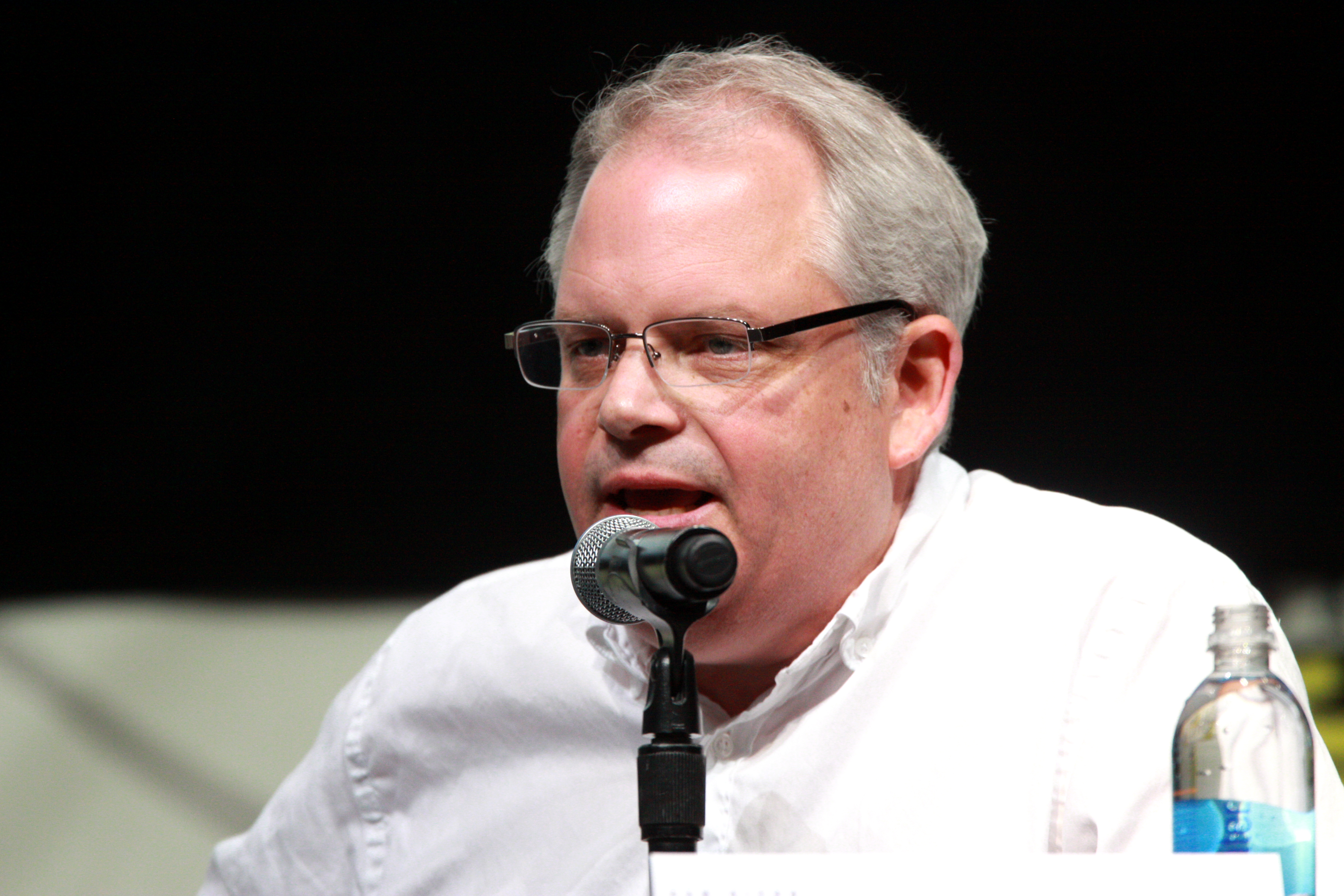
- Coto in 2013
- Born: Manuel Hector Coto; June 10, 1961; Havana, Cuba
- Died: July 9, 2023 (aged 62); Pasadena, California, U.S.
- Education: Loyola University New Orleans (BA); American Film Institute (MFA)
- Occupations: Director, screenwriter, television producer
- Spouse: Robin Trickett
- Writing career
- Period: 1983–2023
- Genres: Drama, adventure, science fiction, horror

Manuel Hector Coto (June 10, 1961 – July 9, 2023) was a Cuban-born American screenwriter, television and film director, and producer on various films and television programs.

Coto was the executive producer and showrunner of Star Trek: Enterprise in its final season, and executive producer of four seasons of 24. He was an executive producer and writer for the fifth season of the Showtime television series Dexter.

== Career ==
Coto graduated from the American Film Institute and has experience in the sci-fi and fantasy genres. In 1990, Brian Helgeland and Coto sold a script, The Ticking Man, for $1 million, but the film was never made. He wrote and directed an episode of the animated Tales from the Cryptkeeper series and also wrote and produced an episode for The Outer Limits when it was revived on Showtime in 1995. He was given the chance to create and write a series for Showtime after The Outer Limits was cancelled. The resulting series was Odyssey 5 and starred Peter Weller (Coto would later cast Weller in roles on Enterprise, 24 and Dexter).

Coto joined the writing crew of Enterprise in 2003, when the show was in its third season; his episodes include "Similitude", "Chosen Realm" and "Azati Prime". He became a co-executive producer later that season. In the fourth season, he became executive producer of the show, alongside series creators Rick Berman and Brannon Braga. According to his bio on StarTrek.com, he was a fan of Star Trek all his life and once wrote a Star Trek comic book.

After that he became executive producer on the fifth, sixth, seventh and the eighth and final season of 24.

In 2010, Coto joined the crew of Showtime drama series Dexter as a writer and executive producer for the fifth season. He continued to work as a writer and executive producer for the show's sixth and seventh seasons, airing 2011 and 2012.

Films Coto has directed include Cover Up, Dr. Giggles and Star Kid.

Coto was the creator and executive producer of Next, which premiered on October 6, 2020, on Fox.

Coto was the executive producer of American Horror Story and American Horror Stories, having written a number of episodes of both series. Coto directed the "Feral", from season one of American Horror Stories, and wrote the season opener, "Dollhouse", for season two.

== Personal life and death ==
Coto was born in Havana on June 10, 1961, fleeing with his mother to Orlando, Florida, United States.

Coto married Robin Trickett on December 27, 2004, in Venice, Italy.

Coto died of pancreatic cancer on July 9, 2023, at the age of 62.

== Filmography ==
=== Directing credits ===
==== Films ====
Year	Film	Notes
1989	Jack in the Box	Short
1990	Playroom	
1991	Cover-Up	
1992	Dr. Giggles	Also co-writer with Graeme Whifler
1997	Star Kid	Also writer
2000	The Other Me	
2001	Zenon: The Zequel	

==== Television ====
Year	Series	Episode
1989	Monsters	"Love Hurts"
1991	Tales from the Crypt	"Mournin' Mess"
2021	American Horror Stories	"Feral"

=== Writing credits ===
==== Films ====
Production	Notes
Dr. Giggles	Feature film (also director, co-written with Graeme Whifler, 1992)
Hostile Intent	Feature film (1997)
Star Kid	Feature film (also director, 1997)
Hellfire	Television film (co-written with Evan Katz, TBA)

==== Television ====
Production	Notes	Broadcaster
Alfred Hitchcock Presents	"Twist" (1988)	NBC
Tales from the Crypt	"Mournin' Mess" (also director, 1991)	HBO
Tales from the Cryptkeeper	"While the Cat's Away" (1993)	ABC
Dead at 21	"Gone Daddy Gone" (1994); "Use Your Illusion" (1994); "Cry Baby Cry" (1994); "Life During Wartime" (1994)	MTV
The Outer Limits	"If These Walls Could Talk" (co-written with Eric Estrin, 1995)	Showtime
Strange World	"Azrael's Breed" (1999); "Rage" (2000)	ABC
Odyssey 5	Also creator and executive producer; writer (4 episodes, 2002): "Pilot" (2002); "Shatterer" (2002); "Astronaut Dreams" (2002); "Fossil" (co-written with Jonathan Glassner, 2002)	Showtime
Star Trek: Enterprise	14 episodes (2003–2005): "Similitude" (2003); "Chosen Realm" (2004); "Harbinger" (2004); "Azati Prime" (2004); "The Council" (2004); "Storm Front" (2004); "United" (2005); "The Aenar" (2005); "Affliction" (2005); "Bound" (2005); "In a Mirror, Darkly: Part 2" (2005); "Demons" (2005); "Terra Prime" (co-written with André Bormanis, Judith and Garfield Reeves-Stevens, 2005)	UPN
The 1/2 Hour News Hour	17 episodes (2007)	Fox News Channel
24	27 episodes (2006–2007, 2009–2010)	Fox
Dexter	10 episodes (2010–2013): "Practically Perfect" (2010); "Take It!" (co-written with Wendy West, 2010); "The Big One" (co-written with Chip Johannessen, 2010); "Smokey and the Bandit" (2011); "Talk to the Hand" (co-written with Tim Schlattmann, 2011); "Sunshine and Frosty Swirl" (2012); "Chemistry" (co-written with Karen Campbell, 2012); "Do You See What I See?" (co-written with Wendy West, 2012); "Every Silver Lining..." (2013); "Remember the Monsters?" (co-written with Scott Buck, 2013)	Showtime
24: Live Another Day	Television miniseries, also executive producer; writer (4 episodes, 2014): "Day 9: 11:00 a.m. – 12:00 p.m." (pilot; co-written with Evan Katz, 2014); "Day 9: 7:00 p.m. – 8:00 p.m." (story writer, co-written with Evan Katz; teleplay by Tony Basgallop & Sang Kyu Kim, 2014); "Day 9: 8:00 p.m. – 9:00 p.m." (story writer, co-written with Evan Katz and Robert Cochran; teleplay by Adam DaSilva, 2014); "Day 9: 10:00 p.m. – 11:00 a.m." (co-written with Evan Katz, 2014)	Fox
24: Legacy	4 episodes (2017)	Fox
American Horror Story	Also executive producer; writer (11 episodes, 2018–2022): "Forbidden Fruit" (2018); "Gaslight" (co-written with Brad Falchuk, 2021); "Winter Kills" (co-written with Brad Falchuk, 2021); "Take Me to Your Leader" (co-written with Brad Falchuk and Kristen Reidel, 2021); "Inside" (co-written with Brad Falchuk and Kristen Reidel, 2021); "Blue Moon" (co-written with Kristen Reidel and Reilly Smith, 2021); "The Future Perfect" (co-written with Brad Falchuk, Kristen Reidel and Reilly Smith, 2021); "Thank You for Your Service" (co-written with Ned Martel and Charlie Carver, 2022); "Smoke Signals" (co-written with Brad Falchuk, 2022); "The Body" (co-written with Brad Falchuk and Our Lady J, 2022); "The Sentinel" (co-written with Our Lady J, 2022)	FX
Next	Also creator and executive producer; writer (2 episodes, 2020): "File #1" (pilot, 2020); "File #10" (co-written with Adam Simon, 2020)	Fox
American Horror Stories	Also executive producer; writer (13 episodes, 2021–2024): "Drive In" (2021); "The Naughty List" (2021); "BA'AL" (co-written with Ali Adler, 2021); "Feral" (2021) (also director); "Dollhouse" (2022); "Aura" (2022); "Drive" (2022); "Facelift" (2022); "Lake" (2022); "Daphne" (co-written with Brad Falchuk, 2023) (posthumous release); "Organ" (2023) (posthumous release); "X" (co-written with Brad Falchuk and Austin Elliott, 2024) (posthumous release); "The Thing Under the Bed" (2024) (posthumous release)	FX on Hulu
