= Travis Mayweather =

Fictional character from Star Trek: Enterprise

- Star Trek character
- Anthony Montgomery as Travis Mayweather
- First appearance: "Broken Bow" (2001)
- Last appearance: "These Are the Voyages..." (2005)
- Created by: Rick Berman; Brannon Braga
- Portrayed by: Anthony Montgomery

In-universe information
- Species: Human
- Affiliation: Starfleet
- Posting: Helmsman, Enterprise (NX-01)
- Rank: Ensign

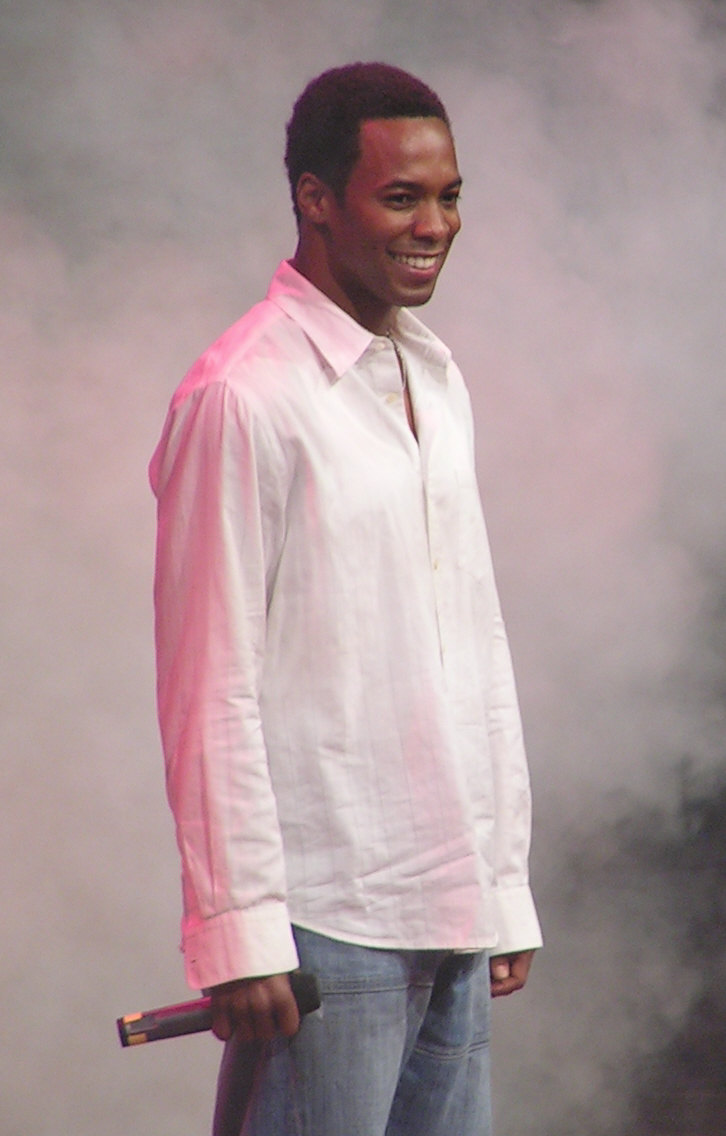
Anthony Montgomery was cast as Travis Mayweather

Travis Mayweather is a fictional character, portrayed by Anthony Montgomery, in the television series Star Trek: Enterprise, serving as a navigator and helm officer aboard the starship Enterprise. He holds the rank of ensign, and is in the command division. Mayweather was one of the main characters throughout the show's entire four-season run.

== Character overview ==
=== Television series ===
Mayweather was born in 2126 aboard the ECS Horizon, a human J-class cargo ship, and has visited the fictional planets Trillius Prime, Draylax, Vega Colony, and both Tenebian moons. He is a "boomer", meaning he grew up aboard cargo ships and that he has more experience in space than even his commanding officers.

Mayweather is a quiet and enthusiastic young man who is a highly skilled pilot and has some spelunking experience. He has at least one brother, Paul, who became the captain of the Horizon after the death of their father, the ship's previous captain, in January 2153. Their mother, Rianna, was the ship's medic and chief engineer. The show mentions that Mayweather has a sister who is married, but has never been seen.

Over the course of the series, Mayweather was injured, incapacitated, or even "killed" more times than any other character in the primary cast.

When Star Trek: Enterprise was first conceived, Mayweather was intended to be a lieutenant but his rank was changed to Ensign because the producers felt that having Mayweather and the older Malcolm Reed at the same rank wouldn't be believable.

=== Novels ===
In the novel Rise of the Federation: A Choice of Futures, Mayweather is promoted to first officer of USS Pioneer under Captain Malcolm Reed.

=== Costumes ===
There were five uniforms made for this character over the show's run, and they were later auctioned off. Examples of this include; the MACO uniform and a Red-shirt Mirror Universe costume for the episode "In A Mirror Darkly".

== Mirror Universe ==
In the two-part episode "In a Mirror, Darkly", the Mirror Universe version of Travis Mayweather is a sergeant in the MACO corps. He eventually allies himself with the Mirror Hoshi Sato in her attempt to take over the Terran Empire.

== Actor commentary and episodes ==
In an interview conducted towards the end of the first season, Anthony Montgomery suggested that it would be good to see Travis Mayweather's parents make an appearance on the show. Montgomery was pleased when this came true in "Horizon", saying, "It was really a touching episode for me, you got a feel of how hard it was for Travis to leave the family and join Starfleet."

== Reception ==
According to author David Greven, "Ensign Travis Mayweather, the helmsman, is African American and a complete blank, rarely is given even one non-technobabble line an episode; without the slightest exaggeration, it is entirely accurate to say that Nichelle Nichols' Uhura on Original Trek had more lines of dialog." In 2016, Travis was ranked as the 33rd most important character of Starfleet within the Star Trek science fiction universe by Wired magazine, out of 100 characters.

Nerd Infinite thought Mayweather was an interesting character due to growing up in space, but would have liked more stories about him.

== See also ==
- List of Star Trek: Enterprise characters
