= Douglas Knapp =

American cinematographer and camera operator (1949–2020)

- Born: August 5, 1949; Tulsa, Oklahoma, U.S.
- Died: February 3, 2020 (aged 70); Burbank, California, U.S.
- Other names: Douglas H. Knapp; Doug Knapp
- Occupations: Cinematographer; camera operator

Douglas Knapp (August 5, 1949 – February 3, 2020) was an American cinematographer and camera operator. His film credits include The All-American Girl, Dark Star, Assault on Precinct 13, and The First Nudie Musical.

== Life and career ==
Douglas Knapp was born in Tulsa, Oklahoma on August 5, 1949. Growing up in Calgary, Alberta, he attended Western Canada High School. In 1972, he graduated from the USC School of Cinematic Arts, where he attended with John Carpenter.

Knapp served as the cinematographer on Dark Star and Assault on Precinct 13, both of which were directed by Carpenter. He also served as the camera operator on Carpenter's Escape from New York, Tim Burton's Frankenweenie and Beetlejuice, as well as Back to School, Coming to America, National Lampoon's Christmas Vacation, and Driving Miss Daisy. In 1994, he received the President's Award from the Society of Camera Operators.

He taught cinematography at the Los Angeles Film School and West Los Angeles College.

After a battle with pancreatic cancer, he died at the age of 70 at his home in Burbank, California on February 3, 2020.

== Filmography ==
=== Feature films ===
- The All-American Girl (1973)
- Dark Star (1974)
- Assault on Precinct 13 (1976)
- The First Nudie Musical (1976)

=== Short films ===
- Peege (1973)

=== Television series ===
- Star Trek: Voyager (1996–1997)
- Star Trek: Enterprise (2005)

=== Videos ===
- Star Trek: Of Gods and Men (2007)
