= TechRepublic =

Online information technology trade publication

- Website type: Online magazine Online community
- Available in: English
- Owner: TechnologyAdvice
- Creators: Tom Cottingham and Kim Spalding
- Key people: Chris Bernard (Managing Editor, Enterprise Division)
- Website: www.techrepublic.com
- Commercial: Yes
- Registration: Optional
- Launched: 1997; 29 years ago

TechRepublic is an online trade publication and social community for IT professionals, providing advice on best practices and tools for the needs of IT decision-makers.

It was founded in 1997 in Louisville, Kentucky, by Tom Cottingham and Kim Spalding, and debuted as a website in May 1999.

The site was purchased by CNET Networks in 2001 for $23 million. TechRepublic was a part of the Red Ventures business portfolio alongside ZDNet, CNET, GameSpot, and Metacritic.

On August 9, 2021, a Nashville-based technology marketing company, TechnologyAdvice, announced the acquisition of TechRepublic.
