= Civilization (Star Trek: Enterprise) =

- Star Trek: Enterprise episode
- Episode no.: Season 1 Episode 9
- Directed by: Mike Vejar
- Written by: Phyllis Strong; Michael Sussman
- Production code: 109
- Original air date: November 14, 2001

Guest appearances
- Diane DiLascio - Riann; Wade Andrew Williams - Garos; Charlie Brewer - Alien / Akaali #1

Episode chronology
← Previous "Breaking the Ice"	Next → "Fortunate Son"
- Star Trek: Enterprise season 1

"Civilization" is the ninth episode (production #109) of the television series Star Trek: Enterprise, and was written by Phyllis Strong and Michael Sussman. Mike Vejar served as director for the episode. The episode aired on UPN on November 14, 2001.

Enterprise investigates a pre-industrial civilization of about 500 million people. They discover that there is another warp-capable species among the unsuspecting inhabitants. After Captain Archer, Commander Tucker, Ensign Sato and Sub-Commander T'Pol arrive, they discover a local scientist who believes that a newly arrived merchant is causing a sickness in the town.

== Plot ==
Enterprise locates a planet inhabited by pre-industrial humanoids called Akaali. Scanners also detect technology which does not correspond with the planet's technological level. Against Sub-Commander T'Pol's recommendation, Captain Archer decides to visit. Going in disguise, T'Pol suggests a distant rural landing site. Once in the Akaali city, Ensign Sato notices inhabitants that appear sick. Scans lead them to an old curio shop, but they encounter a force-field blocking the way. They are then confronted by a local apothecary, Riann. T'Pol stuns her, and when she awakens, Archer convinces her that he is an investigator from another city.

Archer and Tucker revisit the shop during the day posing as antique collectors. They confront Garos, asking him why his DNA is not Akaali. After confirming Tucker and Archer are not natives either, he freely admits his origins: he is part of a survey mission from Malur, and the power source is merely a fabrication unit to provide food and clothes. Archer tells him about the illness, but he claims it is an incurable indigenous virus. Doctor Phlox discovers that the water near the shop has been contaminated with a highly toxic chemical, tetracyanate 622.

Archer and Riann observe the shop at night to try to see what is being delivered to Garos. They follow a man leaving the shop with a delivery. He leaves the crates in a forest clearing, and Archer is then attacked by a Malurian. Under the shop, Archer and Riann then discover that Garos is mining a veridium isotope, and the poisoned water is a by-product. Archer orders the reactor beamed up by Enterprise but the Malurians now have a warship in orbit. T'Pol beams the power plant into the alien ship's path, using torpedoes to detonate it and crippling their shields. On the planet, Archer provides Riann with the antidote, and assures her that the Vulcans will monitor the planet to ensure the Malurians do not return.

== Production ==
Writing partners Phyllis Strong and Mike Sussman had previously been staff for the last season of Star Trek: Voyager. Sussman thought it was funny to make the Malurians the bad guys in this episode, knowing that in the future their species is wiped out by Nomad in the episode "The Changeling".

Production halted for a day in response to the September 11 attacks.

Guest star Wade Anthony Williams who plays Garos, previously appeared on Star Trek: Voyager in the episode "One" as Trajis Lo-Tarik.

When it was first broadcast on UPN, this episode included a PSA, where Scott Bakula welcomed home the aircraft carrier USS Enterprise (CVN-65).

== Music ==
Jay Chattaway's music for the episode was released on compact disc as part of the four disc Star Trek: Enterprise Collection on December 2, 2014, including the orchestral pieces:

2-2	Ye Olde City	2:33
2-3	Entering The Reactor / Reactor Surprise	3:12
2-4	Memorable	0:29

== Reception ==
Civilization was first aired in the United States on UPN on November 14, 2001. According to Nielsen Media Research, it received a 4.6/7 rating share among adults. It had an average of 7.1 million viewers.

Entertainment Weekly said "T'Pol steals the show again" and said she was more interesting than Captain Archer. The romantic subplot with Archer and Rainn was described as "sweet but unaffecting." Michelle Erica Green of TrekNation called the episode "a predictable fable of alien interference" which "gets no marks for originality." Green was positive about the performances of guest star Diane DiLascio (as Riann) and Jolene Blalock. Aint It Cool News gave the episode two out of five, calling it "pedestrian". He compares the poisoning story to a "medieval alien Erin Brockovich", and is annoyed that the episode has no impact on the ongoing plot. Keith DeCandido of Tor.com gave it five out of ten in his 2022 rewatch, and called it "a relentlessly average first-contact story".

The book Beyond the Final Frontier said: "It feels like a Riker episode of The Next Generation, and the story doesn't amount to much, but there's something cathartic about seeing a Starfleet officer who isn't restrained by the Prime Directive starting a gunfight in an alien street."

== Home media ==
This episode was released as part of Enterprise season one, which was released in high definition on Blu-ray disc on March 26, 2013; it has 1080p video and a DTS-HD Master Audio sound track.
