= Star Trek: Enterprise season 1 =

Season of television series

Star Trek: Enterprise
- Season 1
- DVD and Blu-ray cover
- No. of episodes: 26

Release
- Original network: UPN
- Original release: September 26, 2001 – May 22, 2002

Season chronology
- Next → Season 2

The first season of Star Trek: Enterprise (then titled simply Enterprise), an American television series, began airing on September 26, 2001, on UPN. The season concluded after 26 episodes on May 22, 2002. The series was developed by Rick Berman and Brannon Braga, who also served as executive producers. Season one regular cast members include Scott Bakula, Jolene Blalock, Connor Trinneer, Dominic Keating, Linda Park, Anthony Montgomery and John Billingsley.

== Plot overview ==
The first two seasons of Star Trek: Enterprise depict the human exploration of interstellar space by the crew of an Earth ship able to go farther and faster than any humans had previously gone, due to the breaking of the warp barrier, analogous to the Bell X-1 breaking the sound barrier. In the ninety years since Star Trek: First Contact, the Vulcans have been mentoring and guiding humans, routinely holding back scientific knowledge in an effort to keep them contained close to home, believing them to be too impulsive and emotionally dominated to function properly in an interstellar community. When Enterprise finally sets out, the Vulcans, often represented by T'Pol, are conspicuously close by. This generates some conflict as, in several early episodes, Archer and others often complain of the Vulcans' unsubtle methods of keeping an eye on them.

The early encounters and historic culture of familiar Star Trek franchise races, such as the Vulcans, Klingons, Andorians, Ferengi, Nausicaans, and Risans are also explored further. The crew faces situations that are familiar to Star Trek fans, but are unencumbered and unjaded by the experience and rules which have built up over hundreds of years of Trek lore and canon established in previous Star Trek series. Star Trek: Enterprise takes pains to show the origins of some concepts which have become taken for granted in Star Trek canon, such as Lieutenant Reed's development of force fields and red alerts, and Captain Archer's and Sub-Commander T'Pol's questions about cultural interference eventually being resolved by later series' Prime Directive.

A recurring plot device is the Temporal Cold War, in which a mysterious entity from the 27th century uses the Cabal, a group of genetically upgraded aliens of the Suliban species, to manipulate the timeline and change past events. Sometimes sabotaging Enterprise's mission and sometimes saving the ship from destruction, the entity's motives are unknown. Agent Daniels, a Temporal Agent from the 31st century responsible for policing the timeline, occasionally visits Archer to assist him in fighting the Suliban and undoing damage caused by the Temporal Cold War.

== Cast ==
=== Main cast ===
- Scott Bakula as Captain Jonathan Archer
- Jolene Blalock as Sub-Commander T'Pol
- Connor Trinneer as Commander Charles "Trip" Tucker III
- Dominic Keating as Lieutenant Malcolm Reed
- Linda Park as Ensign Hoshi Sato
- Anthony Montgomery as Ensign Travis Mayweather
- John Billingsley as Doctor Phlox

=== Recurring cast ===
- Vaughn Armstrong as Admiral Maxwell Forrest (6 episodes)
- Gary Graham as Ambassador Soval (2 episodes)
- John Fleck as Silik (3 episodes)
- Jeffrey Combs as Commander Shran (2 episodes)
- Matt Winston as Temporal Agent Daniels (2 episodes)

== Episodes ==
In the following table, episodes are listed by the order in which they aired.

| No. overall | No. in season | Title | In-universe date | Directed by | Written by | Original release date | Prod. code | U.S. viewers (millions) |
|---|---|---|---|---|---|---|---|---|
| 1 | 1 | "Broken Bow" | April 16, 2151 | James L. Conway | Rick Berman & Brannon Braga | September 26, 2001 | 40358-721 | 12.54 |
| 2 | 2 | "Broken Bow" | April 16, 2151 | James L. Conway | Rick Berman & Brannon Braga | September 26, 2001 | 40358-721 | 12.54 |
Enterprise (NX-01) is launched, and Captain Archer finds himself in the middle of a Temporal Cold War involving Klingons and Suliban.: Originally shown as a Two-hour Pilot Movie, but in syndication is shown as two separate episodes.
| 3 | 3 | "Fight or Flight" | May 6, 2151 | Allan Kroeker | Rick Berman & Brannon Braga | October 3, 2001 | 40358-003 | 9.18 |
Ensign Sato faces her fears on an alien ship whose crew was murdered, while Lieutenant Reed tries to upgrade the ship's defense system.
| 4 | 4 | "Strange New World" | Unknown | David Livingston | S : Rick Berman & Brannon Braga; T : Mike Sussman & Phyllis Strong | October 10, 2001 | 40358-004 | 7.81 |
A storm traps an away team in a cave on an alien world, and pollen spores cause them to experience psychosis.
| 5 | 5 | "Unexpected" | Unknown | Mike Vejar | Rick Berman & Brannon Braga | October 17, 2001 | 40358-005 | 8.16 |
Commander Tucker helps an alien crew fix their engines, has an "interspecies encounter" in a holodeck, and returns to find himself pregnant.
| 6 | 6 | "Terra Nova" | Unknown | LeVar Burton | S : Rick Berman & Brannon Braga; T : Antoinette Stella | October 24, 2001 | 40358-006 | 8.35 |
Enterprise is sent to learn what happened to an early Human colony called Terra Nova.
| 7 | 7 | "The Andorian Incident" | June 19, 2151 | Roxann Dawson | S : Rick Berman, Brannon Braga; S/T : Fred Dekker | October 31, 2001 | 40358-007 | 7.19 |
Captain Archer, Commander Tucker, and Sub-Commander T'Pol are taken hostage by Andorians in a Vulcan monastery called P'Jem.
| 8 | 8 | "Breaking the Ice" | Unknown | Terry Windell | Andre Jacquemetton & Maria Jacquemetton | November 7, 2001 | 40358-008 | 7.36 |
Lieutenant Reed and Ensign Mayweather extract a rare chemical on a comet while Sub-Commander T'Pol considers marriage to Koss.
| 9 | 9 | "Civilization" | July 31, 2151 | Mike Vejar | Mike Sussman & Phyllis Strong | November 14, 2001 | 40358-009 | 7.14 |
Captain Archer and an away team go undercover to a pre-industrial civilization in order to investigate an unexpected sensor reading.
| 10 | 10 | "Fortunate Son" | Unknown | LeVar Burton | James Duff | November 21, 2001 | 40358-010 | 6.11 |
The cargo ship Fortunate is damaged by Nausicaan pirates and Enterprise offers a helping hand, only to find the acting-captain has secret plans.
| 11 | 11 | "Cold Front" | September 12, 2151 | Robert Duncan McNeill | Stephen Beck & Tim Finch | November 28, 2001 | 40358-011 | 7.33 |
Captain Archer learns that Crewman Daniels is covertly helping to fight the Temporal Cold War against Silik and members of the Suliban Cabal.
| 12 | 12 | "Silent Enemy" | September 1, 2151 | Winrich Kolbe | André Bormanis | December 12, 2001 | 40358-012 | 6.11 |
Ensign Sato tries to find out what Lieutenant Reed's favorite food is, while Captain Archer deals with a secretive and aggressive alien first contact.
| 13 | 13 | "Dear Doctor" | Unknown | James A. Contner | Andre Jacquemetton & Maria Jacquemetton | January 16, 2002 | 40358-013 | 5.65 |
Doctor Phlox and Captain Archer must decide the fate of two species suffering from an evolutionary pandemic.
| 14 | 14 | "Sleeping Dogs" | Unknown | Les Landau | Fred Dekker | January 23, 2002 | 40358-014 | 6.50 |
Ensign Sato, Lieutenant Reed and Sub-Commander T'Pol attempt to help an unresponsive Klingon ship escape the crushing pressures of a gas giant.
| 15 | 15 | "Shadows of P'Jem" | Unknown | Mike Vejar | S : Rick Berman & Brannon Braga; T : Mike Sussman & Phyllis Strong | February 6, 2002 | 40358-015 | 6.05 |
Sub-Commander T'Pol is recalled to Vulcan. During her final away mission, she and Captain Archer are kidnapped, leading to another confrontation between Vulcans and Andorians.
| 16 | 16 | "Shuttlepod One" | November 9, 2151 | David Livingston | Rick Berman & Brannon Braga | February 13, 2002 | 40358-016 | 5.33 |
After finding debris from Enterprise, Lieutenant Reed and Commander Tucker are stranded in a shuttlepod far from help.
| 17 | 17 | "Fusion" | Unknown | Rob Hedden | S : Rick Berman & Brannon Braga; T : Phyllis Strong & Mike Sussman | February 20, 2002 | 40358-017 | 4.49 |
Enterprise encounters a crew of emotional Vulcans; Sub-Commander T'Pol experiences an illicit mind meld, with unsettling results.
| 18 | 18 | "Rogue Planet" | Unknown | Allan Kroeker | S : Rick Berman & Brannon Braga; S/T : Chris Black | February 27, 2002 | 40358-018 | 4.69 |
While exploring an uncharted planet, Enterprise crew members encounter a group of aliens who are hunting down indigenous creatures (Wraiths) for sport. Stephanie Niznik guest stars as the wraith alien.
| 19 | 19 | "Acquisition" | Unknown | James Whitmore Jr. | S : Rick Berman & Brannon Braga; T : Maria Jacquemetton & Andre Jacquemetton | March 27, 2002 | 40358-019 | 5.45 |
A group of Ferengi hijack Enterprise, but Commander Tucker, Captain Archer and Sub-Commander T'Pol resist the pirates in order to win back their ship.
| 20 | 20 | "Oasis" | Unknown | Jim Charleston | S : Rick Berman & Brannon Braga; S/T : Stephen Beck | April 3, 2002 | 40358-020 | 5.64 |
Captain Archer and an away team find a mysterious crew apparently alive on a ship that crash-landed years ago. René Auberjonois, from Deep Space Nine, guest stars as their leader.
| 21 | 21 | "Detained" | Unknown | David Livingston | S : Rick Berman & Brannon Braga; T : Phyllis Strong & Mike Sussman | April 24, 2002 | 40358-021 | 4.88 |
Captain Archer and Ensign Mayweather find themselves imprisoned in a Suliban internment camp run by the Tandarans.
| 22 | 22 | "Vox Sola" | Unknown | Roxann Dawson | S : Rick Berman & Brannon Braga; S/T : Fred Dekker | May 1, 2002 | 40358-022 | 5.40 |
A strange, symbiotic alien creature boards Enterprise and starts kidnapping members of the crew.
| 23 | 23 | "Fallen Hero" | February 9, 2152 | Patrick Norris | S : Rick Berman, Brannon Braga & Chris Black; T : Alan Cross | May 8, 2002 | 40358-023 | 5.34 |
Enterprise finds itself under attack while transporting a controversial Vulcan ambassador.
| 24 | 24 | "Desert Crossing" | February 12, 2152 | David Straiton | S : Rick Berman & Brannon Braga; S/T : André Bormanis | May 8, 2002 | 40358-024 | 4.68 |
Commander Tucker and Captain Archer are invited to a desert planet by a man named Zobral, only to discover that he has ulterior motives.
| 25 | 25 | "Two Days and Two Nights" | February 18, 2152 | Michael Dorn | S : Rick Berman & Brannon Braga; T : Chris Black | May 15, 2002 | 40358-025 | 5.26 |
Enterprise finally arrives for shore leave on Risa. While there, the crew experience more than they are later willing to admit.
| 26 | 26 | "Shockwave, Part I" | Unknown | Allan Kroeker | Rick Berman & Brannon Braga | May 22, 2002 | 40358-026 | 5.28 |
Enterprise is recalled to Earth after the crew is blamed for the accidental destruction of a colony world. En route, it is hijacked by Suliban and Captain Archer is trapped in the future.

== Broadcast ==
| Season | Timeslot | Season premiere | Season finale | TV season | Rank | Viewers (in millions) |
|---|---|---|---|---|---|---|
| 1st | Wednesday 8:00 pm | September 26, 2001 | May 22, 2002 | 2001–2002 | #115 | 5.9 |

== Reception ==
DVDVerdict.com described the first season as "seriously flawed" and noted "weak story telling". IGN awarded the first season of the series a score of 6 out of 10, stating that "for every solid episode like Dear Doctor ... there's a dreadful misfire like Silent Enemy" and attributed the show's declining audience figures to the "early rocky-going". AJ Carson of tvdvdreviews was more positive, describing the first season as "flawed, but it is still among TV's best sci-fi series". While Carson noted problems such as "one dimensional" secondary characters and a visual aesthetic that was at odds with the series' place in the chronology of the franchise, it was also noted that the "series looks terrific, its cast is immensely likeable, and its scripts are intelligent". CBR rated Season 1 of Enterprise as the 27th best season of all Star Trek seasons up to that time, ranking it lower than any of the other three seasons.

In his 2022 rewatch, Keith DeCandido of Tor.com gave the season 1 a rating of 4 out of 10. He says the premise is good in theory but in practice the most interesting thing they do with it is to put humanity into the middle of the Vulcan-Andorian conflict, and describes much of the season as "uninteresting and unexciting and mundane". DeCandido is critical of "Trek's Worst Opening Credits Theme Music" juxtaposed with "Trek's Most Visually Exciting Opening Credits".

=== Awards ===
Two episodes of the first season of Enterprise won and were nominated for various Emmy Awards. The series premiere "Broken Bow" was awarded an Emmy for "Outstanding Special Visual Effects for a Series" and was nominated for two other categories, "Outstanding Sound Editing for a Series" and "Outstanding Makeup for a Series (Prosthetic)". A later episode, "Two Days and Two Nights", won in the category "Outstanding Hairstyling for a Series".

== Media information ==
The first season DVD was released on May 3, 2005, ten days before the broadcast of the final episode of the series. This release marked a couple of firsts for Star Trek TV series DVD releases. It was the first to include extensive deleted scenes (although footage cut from the premiere of Voyager had been included in a featurette previously), and it was the first to include an outtakes or blooper reel.

Star Trek: Enterprise – Season 1
| Set details | | Special features | |
| 25 episodes; 7-disc set; 1:85:1 aspect ratio; Subtitles: English; Audio: English (Dolby Digital 5.1 and 2.0 Surround) | | DVD: Creating Enterprise; O Captain! My Captain! A Profile of Scott Bakula; Cast Impressions: Season One; Inside Suttlepod One; Star Trek Time Travel: Temporal Cold Wars and Beyond; Enterprise Secrets; Admiral Forrest Takes Center Stage; Enterprise Outtakes; Audio Commentary: "Broken Bow"; Text Commentary: "Broken Bow", "The Andorian Incident" and "Vox Sola"; Deleted scenes: "Broken Bow", "Fight or Flight", "Sleeping Dogs", "Shuttlepod One", "Oasis", "Fallen Hero", "Two Days and Two Nights" and "Shockwave, Part I"; Blu-Ray: ? | |
Release dates
| DVD | | Blu-ray | |
| Region 1 | Region 2 | United States (Region free) | United Kingdom (Region free) |
| May 3, 2005 | ? | ? | ? |
