= Fight or Flight (Star Trek: Enterprise) =

- Star Trek: Enterprise episode
- Episode no.: Season 1 Episode 3
- Directed by: Allan Kroeker
- Written by: Rick Berman; Brannon Braga
- Production code: 103
- Original air date: October 3, 2001

Guest appearances
- Jeff Rickets - Alien Captain; Efrain Figueroa - Translator Voice

Episode chronology
← Previous "Broken Bow"	Next → "Strange New World"
- Star Trek: Enterprise season 1

"Fight or Flight" is the third episode (production #103) of the television series Star Trek: Enterprise. "Fight or Flight" was written by Brannon Braga and Rick Berman. The episode aired on UPN on October 3, 2001. Allan Kroeker served as director for the episode; he had previously directed "Endgame," the finale of Star Trek: Voyager.

The starship Enterprise encounters an alien ship that is their first chance of first contact, but find hull breaches and no activity. When Ensign Sato joins Captain Archer to investigate the ship, she soon faces her fears.

== Plot ==
It is May 2151, and the crew of Enterprise are settling in, and are slowly getting acquainted with one another. The crew is restless as they have not encountered anything new in the past two weeks: Captain Archer is trying to locate a squeak in his ready room and anxious that they have not discovered any worthwhile planets yet; Sub-Commander T'Pol points out that Vulcans don't select their destination by what piques their interest as they don't share humanity's enthusiasm for exploration; Lieutenant Reed and Ensign Mayweather are running weapons simulations which are slightly off target; and in Sickbay, Ensign Sato cares for a slug brought back from an away mission.

When T'Pol picks up a drifting Axanar vessel on sensors, Enterprise drops out of warp to investigate. The ship shows evidence of weapons fire and bio-signs but does not respond to hails. Archer is eager to make first contact with a new race, but T'Pol recommends non-interference. After discovering multiple hull breaches, an away team in EV suits is dispatched. The alien crew is soon found dead, suspended upside-down with tubes attached to their chests. Spooked, the away team retreat and Enterprise departs. Doctor Phlox and Sato discuss her fears over the incident, and draw parallels between her and the slug being out of their natural environment.

Eventually, Archer decides to return to the ship. Phlox discovers the bodies are being harvested for a chemical similar to lymphatic fluid, whilst Commander Tucker restores communications and Sato decodes the Axanar language. When T'Pol warns Archer that a ship is approaching, the crew withdraws to Enterprise, but not before shooting the harvest pump. The alien vessel attacks, but Enterprise cannot return fire accurately due to problems with the targeting scanners. A second Axanar vessel arrives, and Sato persuades them that the alien ship was responsible. They then attack the hostile ship and Enterprise is saved. The episode ends with Sato and Phlox releasing the slug on a new planet.

== Production ==
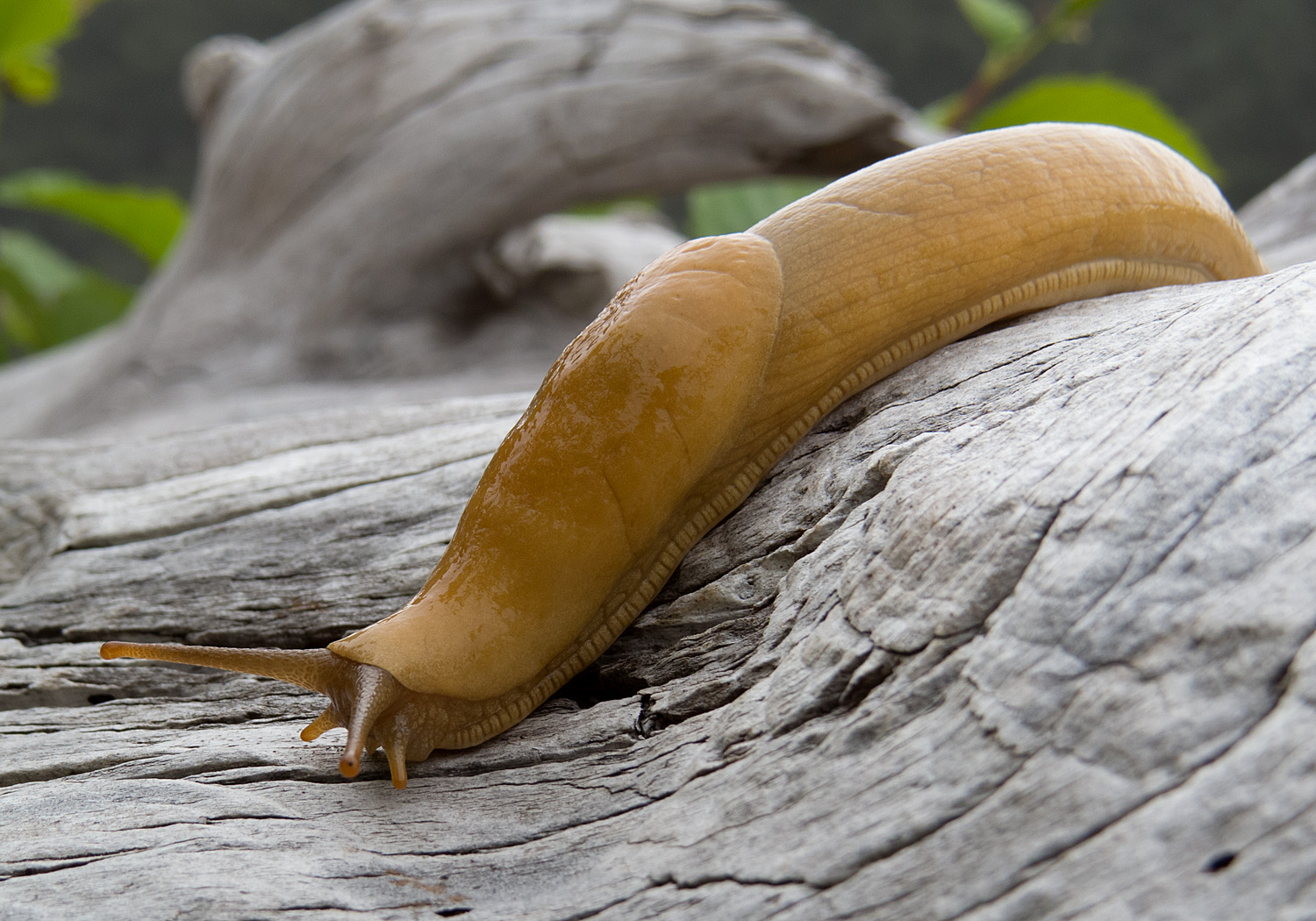
An Ariolimax or banana slug appeared in this episode.

Allan Kroeker served as director for the episode; he had previously directed the finale of Star Trek: Voyager ("Endgame"), the finale of Star Trek: Deep Space Nine ("What You Leave Behind"), and would later direct the finale of Star Trek: Enterprise ("These Are the Voyages..."), amongst 41 episodes across those three series.

Guest star Jeff Rickets who played the Axanar captain returned in "The Andorian Incident" to play Keval, one of the Andorian Imperial Guards. The slug that appears in the episode is an Ariolimax, the large yellow slugs are found in Northern California and commonly referred to as "banana slugs".

John Billingsley as Doctor Phlox had difficulty wearing the space suits, and while filming this episode pulled off his prosthetic ears when trying to remove the helmet.

== Reception ==
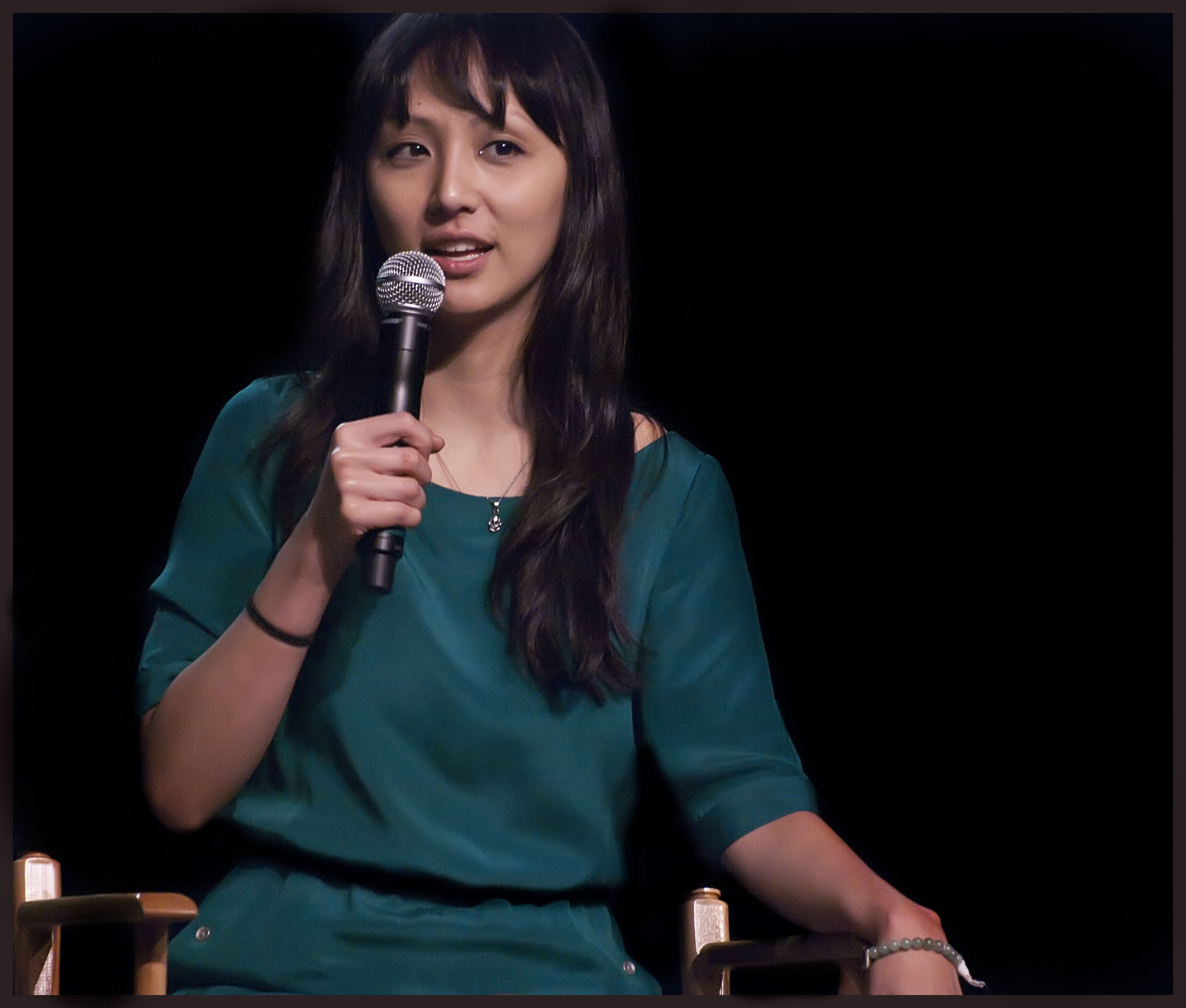
Actress Linda Park, cast as Hoshi Sato, said this episode showed how her character grew during the series

Fight or Flight was first aired in the United States on UPN on October 3, 2001. According to Nielsen Media Research, it received a 5.7/9 rating share among adults. It had an average of 9.2 million viewers. Audience retention was comparatively higher than the second episode of Star Trek: Voyager.

Writing for Knight Ridder, television critic Bobby Bryant named "Fight or Flight" among the four best episodes of the season. Bryant cited the Enterprise crew's response to the discovery of a slaughtered alien crew 'initially fleeing' as "one of the most honest reactions in Star Trek history." TrekWeb mentioned this episode, as one of the better episodes, noting that it takes place in space, and "manage[s] to capture at least some of that thrill of exploration and bring a fresh sensibility to the usual Star Trek cliches." A 2005 review of season 1 from TrekWeb was more critical of "Fight or Flight", and categorized it among "stories that were bland and uninspired in its creation and execution, boringly going where everyone else had gone before." Writing for Airlock Alpha, Michael Hinman was also critical of the episode, and commented, "'Broken Bow' hit the small screen of UPN with rave reviews, and impressive ratings. But things went downhill from there after a poor outing with blood-sucking aliens in 'Fight or Flight.'" Hinman observed that the episode was "seriously lacking" in amount of "tense moments"; he went on to note: "Another thing that was missing from 'Fight or Flight' ... was the sweeping camera angles that helped differentiate this new series from the static shots always found in Star Trek: Voyager and other incarnations." IGN rated it 4 out of 5. Keith DeCandido of Tor.com gave it 5 out of 10.

In an interview with Ian Spelling of The New York Times, actress Linda Park who portrays character Hoshi Sato on Enterprise cited "Fight or Flight" as an example of the progression and growth of her character during the series. In the book Star Trek 101 by Terry J. Erdmann and Paula M. Block quoted dialog from Park's character in an overview description of Hoshi Sato: "I was Jonathan Archer's first choice for this mission. Every inhabited world we come to is going to be filled with language. He needs me here."

Den of Geek recommended this episode and "Vox Sola" as ones to watch for the character development of Hoshi. The Digital Fix said this was one of the best episodes in season one, noting how it engages the audience in the wonder of exploration.
