= Detained (Star Trek: Enterprise) =

- Star Trek: Enterprise episode
- Episode no.: Season 1 Episode 21
- Directed by: David Livingston
- Story by: Rick Berman; Brannon Braga
- Teleplay by: Mike Sussman; Phyllis Strong
- Production code: 121
- Original air date: April 24, 2002

Guest appearances
- Dean Stockwell - Colonel Grat; Christopher Shea - Sajen; Jessica D. Stone - Narra; Dennis Christopher - Danik; David Kagen - Major Klev; Wilda Taylor - Suliban Woman

Episode chronology
← Previous "Oasis"	Next → "Vox Sola"
- Star Trek: Enterprise season 1

"Detained" is the twenty-first episode of the first season of the American television series Star Trek: Enterprise. The episode was developed into a teleplay by Mike Sussman and Phyllis Strong from a story by Rick Berman and Brannon Braga. David Livingston served as director. The episode aired on UPN on April 24, 2002. It guest stars Dean Stockwell and is the first time he had worked with Scott Bakula since they had starred together in the series Quantum Leap.

Captain Archer and Ensign Mayweather are detained by the Tandarans in a Suliban internment camp. Learning of the Suliban's persecution by the Tandarans, Archer enlists the aid of Enterprise and his crew.

== Plot ==
Captain Archer and Ensign Mayweather wake up in a Tandaran prison. They are soon met by Major Klev, who orders them both to the office of Colonel Grat. Grat interrogates them in detail regarding their intrusion into Tandaran space and the Suliban, and says that they will have to appear before a magistrate in three days time. He also refuses to allow Archer to contact Enterprise, but does so himself and apprises them of the current situation. Upon hearing this, Commander Tucker advocates a rescue attempt, but Sub-Commander T'Pol prefers to avoid provoking the Tandarans further, and orders Enterprise to Tandar Prime.

Later, Archer meets a Suliban called Danik, who tells him that they are in Detention Complex 26, an internment camp for Suliban imprisoned when the Cabal began attacking the Tandaran Sector eight years previously. In his office, Grat questions Archer in detail about the events of episode "Broken Bow", and also demands information about the Temporal Cold War. Archer wonders why innocent Suliban are being held prisoner, but Grat warns that delaying could result in Archer missing the transport to Tandar Prime. Grat contacts the Enterprise to report that the hearing has unfortunately been "delayed", allowing Lieutenant Reed and Ensign Sato to triangulate his signal and locate the prison.

That night, a communicator is beamed to Archer and Mayweather's cell. Archer tells Tucker he wants to help the Suliban escape, and Danik says his people can go to the Niburon Colonies, away from the Tandar Sector. The following morning Grat discovers the communicator and Archer is sent to isolation as punishment. Aboard Enterprise, T'Pol uses torpedoes to ward off the Tandaran defense-ships before clearing Tucker to launch in a shuttle-pod. Mayweather distracts Klev, allowing a Suliban-disguised Reed to activate charges and initiate the escape. As they flee, Grat argues that the Suliban will all go to join the Cabal, but Archer says that he hasn't been at the camp very long and doesn't know the Suliban very well, but he knows a hell of a lot more about the Suliban than Colonel Grat does. He knows that the Suliban will attempt to join the Niburon Colonies and that they have no interest in being genetically altered and joining the Cabal.

== Production ==
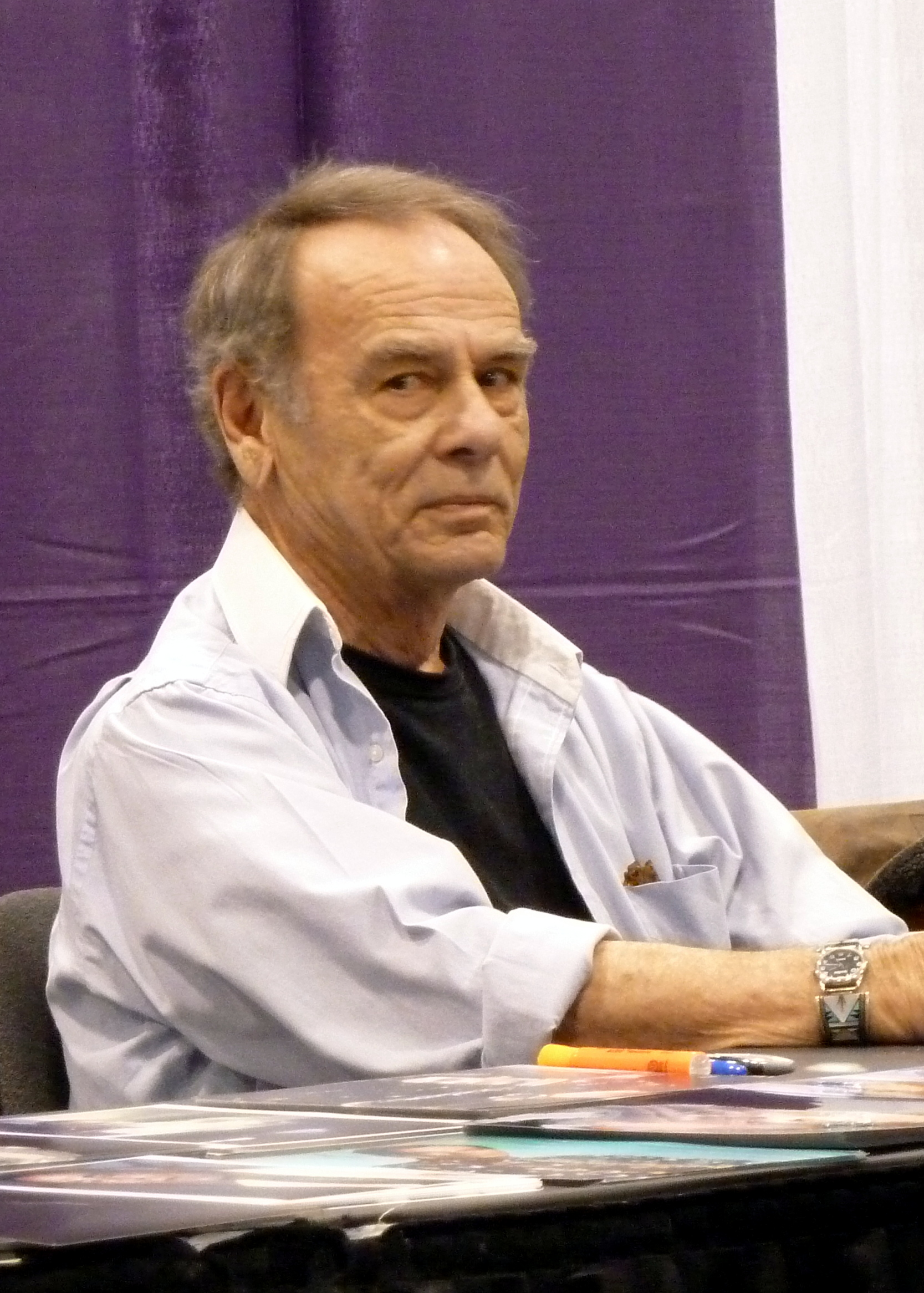
Dean Stockwell previously starred alongside Scott Bakula in the television series Quantum Leap

Prior to Enterprise, main cast member Scott Bakula had starred for several years in the television series Quantum Leap alongside Dean Stockwell, and there were suggestions at the start of Enterprise that Stockwell could make an appearance. Bakula suggested that Stockwell should appear in the show, saying "wouldn't that be great if we could get him on? It has to be; we've got to do it." At the start of the first season, this prospect was down-played in interviews. In a January 2002 interview, Bakula said that he missed working with Stockwell and that they would both love do an episode together, but that "They would have to be clever about it or just ignore it, so that it wouldn't be a distraction, but add to the show." Stockwell did not actively pursue a role in the series and waited to see what might happen. When an offer was made he contacted Bakula to check large amounts of prosthetic makeup was not required. Stockwell noted that Colonel Grat had a handheld computing device that was a clear reference to the supercomputer Ziggy from Quantum Leap. Guest stars Dennis Christopher and Christopher Shea, who play the Suliban Danik and Sajen, both previously appeared as Vorta on Deep Space Nine. Shea would return as an Andorian in the season 2 episode "Cease Fire." John Fleck who plays the Suliban leader Silik is friends with Dennis Christopher and warned him what to expect with the green pebble-dash makeup. Christopher appreciated the nuances in his part of the story, the difficulty of a father surviving in an internment camp, while teaching his child not to hate their captors. The makeup was very constricting and concealed their facial expressions, so the performance and emotion had to come through in the voice, so he was impressed by how well the child actor performed.

The episode was written by Mike Sussman and Phyllis Strong. Sussman was critical of the episode, because he disliked the obvious allegory of "message shows" and said "if it's intelligent, interesting, surprising—it doesn't need some hit-you-over-the-head message." Brannon Braga praised the performances of Bakula and Stockwell, he said "It's very different from their Quantum Leap dynamic, and it turned out wonderfully."

== Reception ==
Detained was first aired in the United States on UPN on April 24, 2002. According to Nielsen, it received a 3.0/5 rating share among adults. It had an average of 4.9 million viewers. It seemed to have struggled to attract audiences after two weeks of reruns, ratings were only slightly higher than "Fusion" which had the same rating and was the ratings low point of the season.

Aint It Cool News gave the episode 2.5 out of 5, with positive comments about the scenes featuring Stockwell but criticism for the heavy handed allegory. Michelle Erica Green of TrekNation called it "timely" and although it does not have the moral complexity of Voyager's "Remember" or Deep Space Nine's "Duet" the simple message of not prejudging a whole group of people comes through loud and clear. Keith DeCandido of Tor.com gave it 7 out of 10, in his 2022 rewatch. He was disappointed "that the metaphor was sledgehammered a little too heavily" and prison break was not more action-packed but the Bakula-Stockwell reunion, was "worth the price of admission all by itself" and "Stockwell is never not wonderful."

Detained has been listed among the best episodes of Star Trek: Enterprise and of all Star Trek. The A.V. Club gave this an honorable mention, in their list of recommended Enterprise television episodes. TrekNews.net ranked "Detained" as the tenth most essential episode of Enterprise, calling it a solid episode noting how Captain Archer must deal with an internment camp. Vox rated this one of the top 25 essential episodes of all Star Trek.

== Home media ==
This episode was released as part of Enterprise season one, which was released in high definition on Blu-ray disc on March 26, 2013; the release has 1080p video and a DTS-HD Master Audio sound track.
