= Strange New World (Star Trek: Enterprise) =

- Star Trek: Enterprise episode
- Episode no.: Season 1 Episode 4
- Directed by: David Livingston
- Story by: Rick Berman; Brannon Braga
- Teleplay by: Mike Sussman; Phyllis Strong
- Production code: 104
- Original air date: October 10, 2001

Guest appearances
- Kellie Waymire - Crewman Elizabeth Cutler; Henri Lubatti - Crewman Ethan Novakovich; Rey Gallegos - Crewman

Episode chronology
← Previous "Fight or Flight"	Next → "Unexpected"
- Star Trek: Enterprise season 1

"Strange New World" is the fourth episode (production #104) of the television series Star Trek: Enterprise and was written by Mike Sussman and Phyllis Strong based on a story from producers Brannon Braga and Rick Berman. David Livingston served as director for the episode. The episode aired on UPN on October 10, 2001.

Enterprise encounters a new world much like Earth. A small crew stays on the surface overnight to continue researching the planet. A violent storm forces the crew to shelter into a local cave, but crew members believe they are not alone.

== Plot ==
Enterprise passes a previously unknown Minshara-class planet with an Earth-like atmosphere and surface. Captain Archer orders a shuttle to be prepared for an away mission. After an afternoon studying the planet, Sub-Commander T'Pol, Commander Tucker, and Ensign Mayweather request further time on the planet, and do so with Archer's approval. Crewmen Cutler and Novakovich are also allowed to remain on the surface to study nocturnal life. The Captain and Lieutenant Reed then return to the Enterprise.

Later that evening, a violent storm front approaches so Tucker suggests that the landing party use the cave that T'Pol discovered earlier for shelter. Once there, Mayweather goes back to the original camp-site to recover food, and notices three humanoid life-forms wandering around, but T'Pol's scans reveal no unusual bio-signs. In the confines of the cave, Crewmen Cutler and Novakovich begin seeing and hearing humanoids too. Tucker also reports to Archer about seeing a mysterious alien lifeform. Searching for these other lifeforms, T'Pol takes a phase pistol and walks deeper into the cave. In her absence, the landing party become increasingly suspicious of her behavior, thinking that she is withholding information about the aliens from them.

Concerned, Archer and Reed attempt to reach the landing party in a shuttlepod, but cannot do so until the wind dies down. Novakavich is emergency beamed up due to his erratic behavior and bio-sign, and Doctor Phlox finds he has been exposed to tropolisine, a hallucinogenic compound found in pollen. Phlox also discovers he is near death, poisoned by an unexpected side-effect of the chemical. On the planet, Tucker is increasingly suffering from hallucinations. T'Pol reports to Archer that he is irrational and that Mayweather and Cutler are nearly unconscious. Reed beams an antidote down to the cave, and despite Tucker's interference, T'Pol is able to administer it. The next morning, the storm blows over, and everyone is fine.

== Production ==
The title "Strange New World" is a reference to the opening narration spoken by William Shatner in Star Trek: The Original Series where he says their mission is "to explore strange new worlds, to seek out new life and new civilizations, to boldly go where no man has gone before."

The episode was written by Mike Sussman and Phyllis Strong. They had both been working as writers on Star Trek: Voyager, and on their last day, were shown the script of the pilot episode of Enterprise "Broken Bow". Sussman and Strong were tasked with writing the script for "Strange New World" before Captain Archer had been cast or the pilot had begun filming. They loved the retro premise of the show, but there were many details still left to figure out. Science consultant and story editor André Bormanis pitched the line that if the captain was going to bring his dog Porthos, then someone could say "Where no dog has gone before". Brannon Braga liked the line and said to include it, and Rick Berman noted the line as an example of where the show made the effort to be intentionally funny. Scott Bakula insisted that the death of a crew member would be significant and that if there was not time to address the point and properly mourn the death then the character would need to survive.

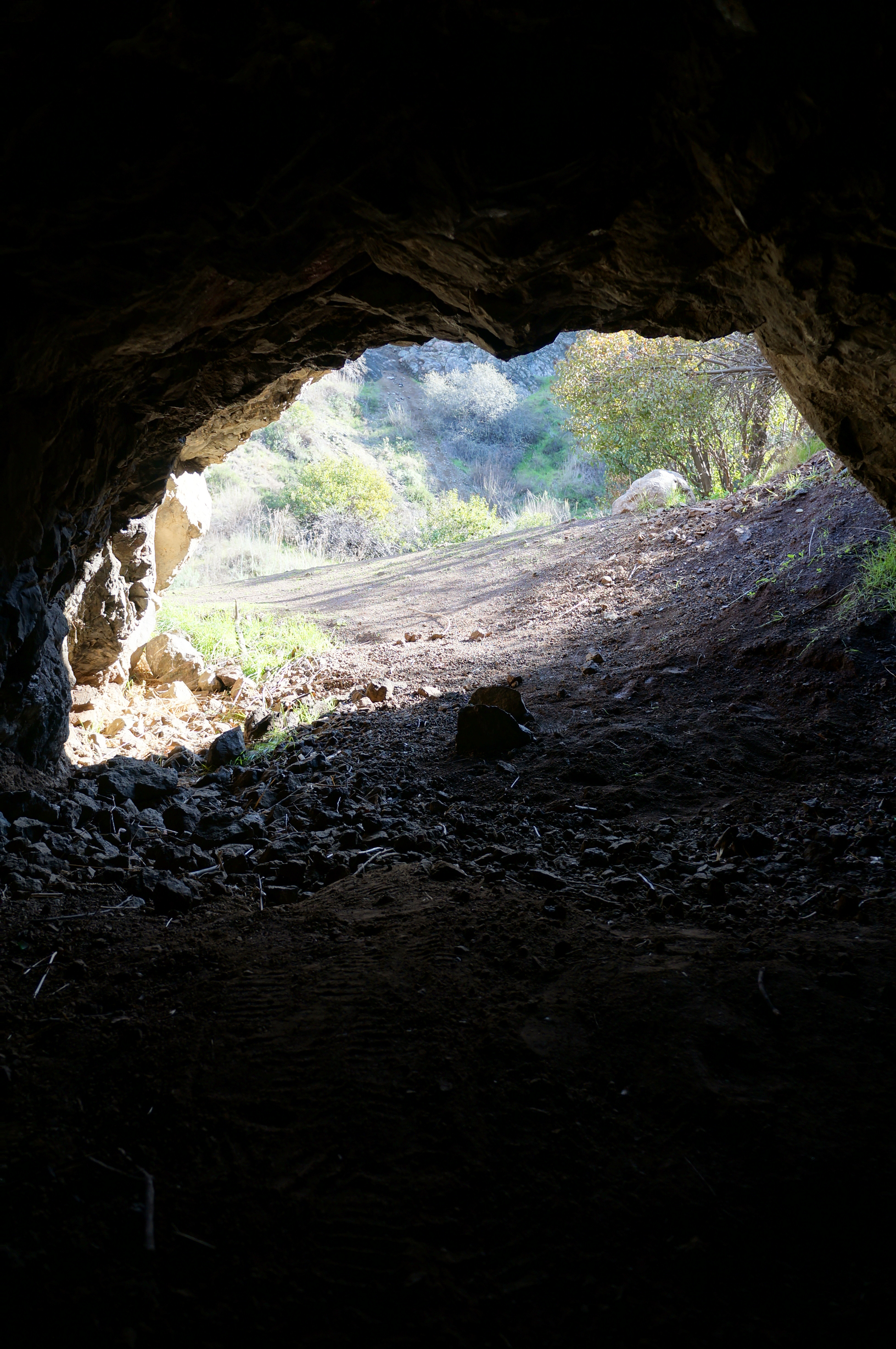
Filmed at the Bronson Caves, in Griffith Park.

Star Trek had previously referred to "class M" planets, this was the first time it was explained that "M" was short for Minshara, a Vulcan word.

The episode filmed on location in Griffith Park and used the Bronson Caves, with additional detail added by Visual Effects producer Dan Curry using matte painting techniques.

Kellie Waymire was cast as Elizabeth Cutler, and told it could be a recurring role. Waymire appeared again in the episodes "Dear Doctor" and "Two Days and Two Nights". Henri Lubatti, who plays Ethan Novakovich, previously voiced a character in the video game Star Trek: Away Team.

"Strange New World" marked the first occasion in which Anthony Montgomery participated in stunt work, finding that his previous work in the television series Awesome Adventures proved beneficial. He explained in an interview shortly after that he wanted to participate in as many stunt activities as the producers would let him.

== Reception ==
This episode was first broadcast October 10, 2001 on UPN. It achieved a Nielsen rating of 5.0/8 and was watched by a total average of 7.81 million viewers. It faced strong competition from the season premiere of Ed on NBC and Dawson's Creek on The WB.

"Strange New World" was noted by USA Today as an interesting episode of the franchise, pointing out the tension between humans and Vulcans in the Pre-Federation setting of this show. They note the fresh take on the Star Trek universe is a "whole lot of fun" highlighting the tension between first time space-explorer Captain Archer and Vulcan T'Pol. About.com's Julia Houston called it "An okay outing, particularly considering Star Trek rarely shines in the early episodes". She compared it to the episodes "The Naked Time" and "The Naked Now," where everyone goes nuts and reveals their inner fears, but was disappointed that Archer was not in the cave to reveal his thoughts. Aint It Cool News gave it 2.5 out of 5, calling it the "transporter mishap" episode. IGN rated it 3 out of 5, and found it generic, like an episode of the Star Trek remade but without the style, cinematography, score, or personality that made it fresh and novel back in its day. Keith DeCandido of Tor.com gave it 5 out of 10, calling it a depressingly standard episode and criticizes the stupid character decisions required to make the episode happen. He gave the episode and Bakula credit for insisting that the crew member survive instead of repeating the "morally repugnant" redshirt trope of casually ignoring the death of a minor character.

== Home media ==
This episode was released as part of Enterprise season one, which was released in high definition on Blu-ray disc on March 26, 2013; it has 1080p video and a DTS-HD Master Audio sound track.
