= Vox Sola =

- Star Trek: Enterprise episode
- Episode no.: Season 1 Episode 22
- Directed by: Roxann Dawson
- Story by: Rick Berman; Brannon Braga; Fred Dekker
- Teleplay by: Fred Dekker
- Production code: 122
- Original air date: May 1, 2002

Guest appearances
- Vaughn Armstrong - Kreetassan Captain; Joseph Will - Crewman Michael Rostov; Renée Elise Goldsberry - Crewman Kelly

Episode chronology
← Previous "Detained"	Next → "Fallen Hero"
- Star Trek: Enterprise season 1

"Vox Sola" (Latin for lone voice) is the twenty-second episode (production #122) of the television series Star Trek: Enterprise. It was developed into a teleplay by Fred Dekker from a story by Rick Berman, Brannon Braga, and Dekker. Roxann Dawson was the director. The episode aired on UPN on May 1, 2002.

Set in 2100s of the Star Trek science fiction universe, an early faster-than-light starship sets out to explore a galaxy filled with aliens. When a strange, symbiotic alien creature boards Enterprise and captures several crew members, Ensign Hoshi Sato attempts to decipher the creature's complex language.

== Plot ==
On board Enterprise, there has been a minor diplomatic incident with the Kreetassans. As the Kreetassan vessel departs, a clear, amoeba-like entity crosses to Enterprise, and systems begin to malfunction on a ship-wide basis. Crewmen Rostov and Kelly are both trapped in a cargo-hold by the entity which has now grown tendrils. Captain Archer, Commander Tucker, Lieutenant Reed and another crewman go to investigate and are all caught as well, except Reed who escapes through the cargo-hold-hatch, severing one of the tendrils in the process.

Ensign Mayweather suggests tracking the Kreetassans down to ask about the entity, while Doctor Phlox examines the severed tendril. He determines that those entrapped are becoming symbiotically linked together through the entity. Sato wants to communicate with it, but Sub-Commander T'Pol decides to neutralize it instead. Mayweather manages to find the Kreetassans, asking for any information they may have. They agree to share the location of the entity's home world, but only after Mayweather apologizes for the earlier incident. Apparently the "misunderstanding" occurred when the Kreetassans were taken to the mess-hall to find many of the crew eating in public, which they regard as highly vulgar.

T'Pol, Sato, and Reed make their way to the cargo-bay to attempt communication. Reed assembles experimental force-field-emitters, which are able to protect them from the entity's tendrils. Sato uses the Universal Translator to modulate a frequency that the entity can understand. After several attempts, the entity responds. It gives them new, more precise coordinates on its home-world, and Phlox notices that the bio-signs of the trapped personnel are stabilizing. The entity then releases the personnel, shrinking back to its original size. On the entity's planet, the organism and the severed tendril are both released and quickly re-absorbed into a larger alien body. As the shuttle-pod returns to Enterprise, dawn breaks and the entire area is revealed to be covered with a single huge organism.

== Production ==
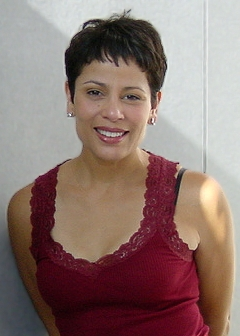
This episode was directed by Roxann Dawson, who had also starred on the main cast of Star Trek: Voyager

The episode title "Vox Sola" comes from Latin and literally means lone voice. The script was originally titled "The Needs of the One". The episode was directed by Roxann Dawson, she previously directed "The Andorian Incident". The episode was written by Enterprise creators Rick Berman and Brannon Braga, and also Fred Dekker. Dekker had thought Enterprise would and should be different, "I thought that we could create alien life-forms that were almost unimaginable" but felt that the series quickly fell back on "all the familiar tropes and aliens that the Star Trek franchise had already traded in for decades." He complained that his scripts were "meddled with" and "heavily rewritten". Dekker praised the cast, and said his favorite character was Hoshi because he felt she was the most human and relatable, so he tried to write for her as much as possible.

Vaughn Armstrong who played the Kreetassan Captain in this episode also plays Admiral Forrest. He ultimately appeared in 27 Star Trek episodes in 12 different roles. The costume and makeup took six to seven hours, and Armstrong said it was the most difficult character he had played. The other guest stars were Renée Elise Goldsberry as Crewman Kelly, and Joseph Will as Crewman Michael Rostov.

Roxann Dawson praised the cast, especially "Scott and Conner, who spent days suspended in harnesses covered in slime without a single complaint." She said "This episode was difficult, challenging and... well, at times I thought it was almost impossible." It was challenging to create the alien organism, but more importantly to make it believable and scary.

Most of the alien creature effects were done practically on set. Liz Castro was responsible for coordinating the visual effects and the CGI tendrils, with on-set help from Dan Curry. Goo was painted all over the actors and practical models so that it was dripping, then matched in CGI. The tendrils' fast movement made it easier to integrate them with the live footage. Curry found it interesting how the episode required the various departments—production design, special effects, visual effects, and stunts—to work together rather than carrying out their tasks separately. The stunt coordinator suggested using foam cutouts on stands to help visualize how the people would look in the cargo bay. The alien planet was filmed on a bluescreen, with the cast in their spacesuits and real dirt, but the rest was fully CGI.

== Reception ==
Vox Sola was first aired in the United States on UPN on May 1, 2002. According to Nielsen, it received a 3.4/6 rating share among adults. It had an average of 5.4 million viewers.

Jamahl Epsicokhan said the episode had a genuine sci-fiction ending, and some "good moments". He also noted that it references the French film The Wages of Fear, which is described as a classic film. He rated the episode 2.5 out of 4. Michelle Erica Green of TrekNation said the episode was redeemed for her by the unnamed alien, calling it "one of the most interesting we've seen on Trek in years" and was pleased that Sato finally had a large part to play. Television Without Pity gave the episode a grade B+. The book Beyond the Final Frontier reviewed the episode, and said "the alien looks a bit silly and the weirdness of the threat never quite comes across. Not a bad episode, but not a terribly exciting one either." Keith DeCandido of Tor.com gave it 8 out of 10, in his 2022 rewatch, and notes "what’s particularly strong about this episode is that it gives us two genuinely alien aliens."

Den of Geek recommended this episode and "Fight or Flight" as important episode to watch for the character Hoshi. TheGamer ranked this one of the top 25 creepiest episodes of all Star Trek series. The Digital Fix said this was a "great episode" in season one of Enterprise, saying it felt like a "classic" Star Trek story.

== Home media ==
Enterprise season one was released in high definition on Blu-ray disc on March 26, 2013, with 1080p video and a DTS-HD Master Audio sound track. The Blu-Ray included a feature on the making of this episode, which had been originally intended as a pilot episode for a PBS show titled "On The Set".

== See also ==
- The Wages of Fear (1953 film referenced in this episode)
