= Klimaszewski Twins =

Polish American models

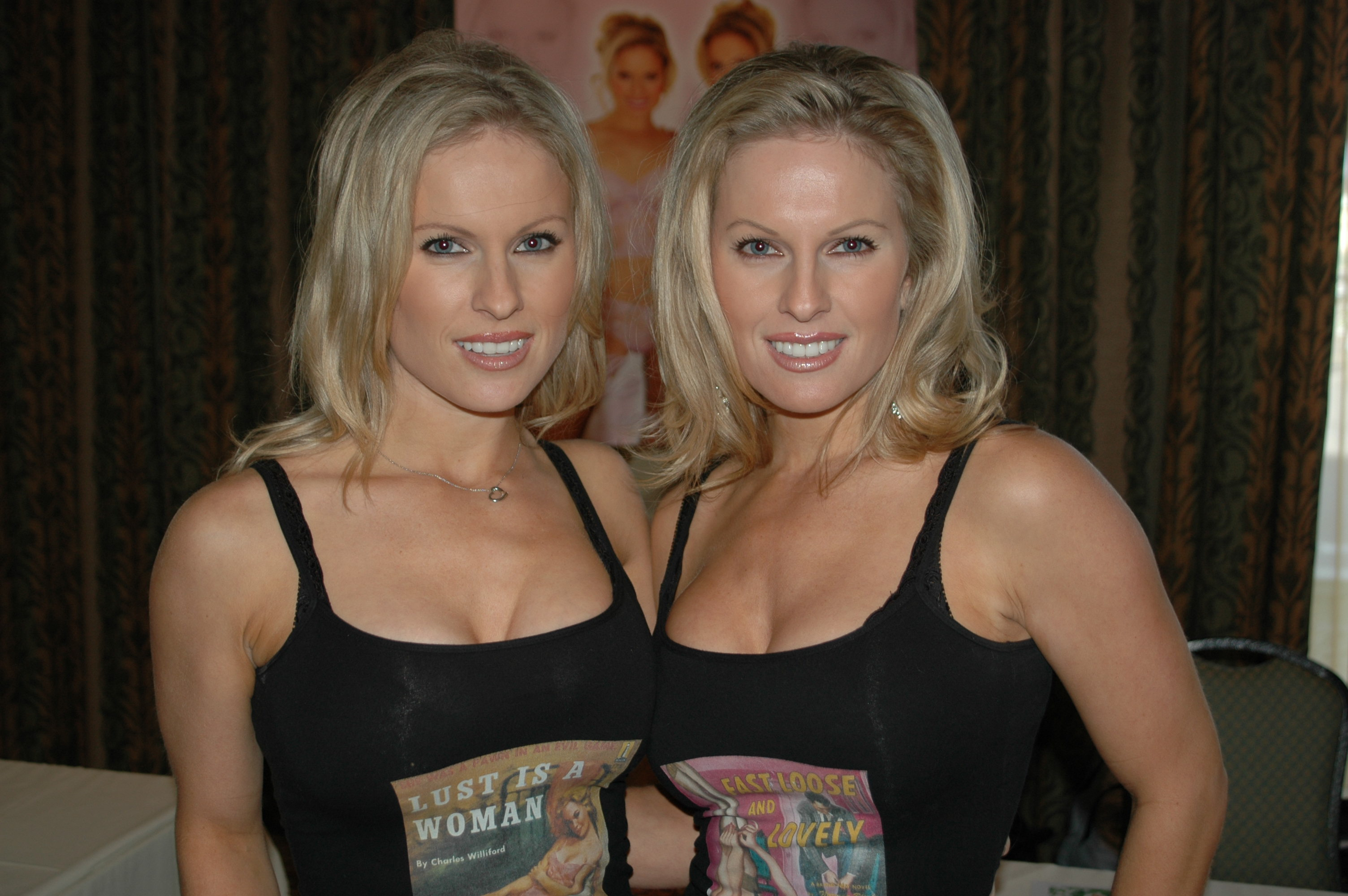
- The Klimaszewski Twins at the 2004 Glamourcon in LA

Personal information
- Born: Diane Klimaszewski; Elaine Klimaszewski; September 13, 1971 (age 55) Leicester, Massachusetts

Professional wrestling career
- Ring name(s): Diane and Elaine Klimaszewski; Diane and Elaine Power; Gold (Diane) and Silver (Elaine); Lolli (Diane) and Pop (Elaine)
- Billed height: 5 ft 3 in (1.60 m)
- Billed weight: 140 lb (64 kg)
- Trained by: Ultimate Pro Wrestling
- Debut: 1999
- Retired: 2001

Diane and Elaine Klimaszewski (born September 13, 1971) are Polish American models better known as the Coors Light Twins. They are also actresses and were briefly members of World Championship Wrestling's Nitro Girls.

== Careers ==
The twins made their first television appearance as teen dancers on Star Search in 1987 followed by appearances as models on the NBC game show Let's Make a Deal in 1990. They started acting in 1991 in Problem Child 2. In 1998, they worked together for a magic trick performed by The Masked Magician in Breaking the Magician's Code: Magic's Biggest Secrets Finally Revealed. On November 29, 1999, the twins debuted as Lolli and Pop on World Championship Wrestling in a segment with Johnny the Bull and Big Vito LoGrasso. In 2000, their ring names were changed to Gold and Silver and they briefly became members of the Nitro Girls dance group. The twins then signed with the World Wrestling Federation later that year, although the role that they were to play was not made clear. They were sent to Ultimate Pro Wrestling, a developmental territory, where they competed as the Power Twins. The Klimaszewskis were released by the WWF in June 2001.

They were cast as the Coors Light Twins beginning in 2002, in an ad campaign called "Love Songs" created by the agency Foote Cone & Belding. Coors reported that these were "the highest-scoring spots in Coors history" and they quickly became part of popular culture, parodied by Jennifer Garner and Rachel Dratch on Saturday Night Live while the real twins were invited to sing the national anthem at sporting events. The ads became a subject of political controversy when Pete Coors ran for the United States Senate in the 2004 election.

The sisters have appeared as regular cast members on Steve Harvey's Big Time Challenge, as the Big Time Twins. They appeared in full-body makeup, and with CGI-animated tongues, as aliens in "Broken Bow", the series premiere of Star Trek: Enterprise. They also had guest appearances in the movie Scary Movie 3 as the Coors Light Twins, and they run their own fashion line, ZipperGirls.

== Filmography ==
| Year | Title | Diane's role | Elaine's role | Notes |
|---|---|---|---|---|
| 1990 | Let's Make a Deal | Model | Model | |
| 1991 | Problem Child 2 | Hot Tub Girl | Hot Tub Girl | |
| 1995 | Weird Science | Tiffany | Brittany | Episode: "Bikini Camp Slasher" |
| 1996 | Rudy Coby: Ridiculously Dangerous | Aerobic Girl | —N/a | |
| 1996 | Tiger Heart | Amy | Amanda | |
| 1996 | Spy Hard | Twin #1 | Twin #2 | |
| 1996 | The Last Frontier | Twin #2 | Twin #1 | Episode: "Babes in Joyland" |
| 1997 | Pauly | Geena | Shoshana | Episode: "Pauly Come Home" |
| 1997 | Looking for Lola | Dancer | Dancer | |
| 1998 | Breaking the Magician's Code: Magic's Biggest Secrets Finally Revealed | Herself – Magic Assistant | Herself – Magic Assistant | |
| 2001 | Skippy | Bikini Twin | Bikini Twin | |
| 2001 | Star Trek: Enterprise | Dancer | Dancer | Episode: "Broken Bow: Part I" |
| 2001–2002 | Nikki | Dancer | Low Voice Prostitute / Dancer | 3 episodes |
| 2002 | Murderous Camouflage | Detective Johnson #2 | Detective Johnson #1 | |
| 2003–2004 | Hollywood Squares | Herself – Panelist | Herself – Panelist | 10 episodes |
| 2003 | The Drew Carey Show | Mandy – Minnesota Twin #1 | Sandy – Minnesota Twin #2 | Episode: "A Means to an End" |
| 2003 | Gigli | —N/a | Beach Dancer | |
| 2003 | Ripley's Believe It or Not! | Herself | Herself | Episode: "4.21" |
| 2003 | Scary Movie 3 | Diane | Elaine | |
| 2003 | Princess | Stacy | Tracy | |
| 2004 | She Spies | Twin #2 | Twin #1 | |
| 2004 | The 100 Scariest Movie Moments | Herself | Herself | |
| 2005 | Drop Dead Sexy | Brandy | Amber | |
| 2006 | Date Movie | Slut Twin | Slut Twin | |
| 2006 | The Late Late Show with Craig Ferguson | Megan | Ashley | Episode: "2.128" (Uncredited) |
| 2006 | Bachelor Party Vegas | Chrissy | Missy | |
| 2008 | Bar Starz | Twin #1 | Twin #2 | |

== See also ==
- Nitro Girls
