= Drop Dead Sexy =

- Directed by: Michael Philip
- Written by: Paul Doiron; John Benjamin Martin; Michael Philip
- Produced by: Michael Philip; Charles Acosta; Duncan Montgomery; Richard Middleton
- Starring: Jason Lee; Crispin Glover; Lin Shaye; Xander Berkeley
- Cinematography: Thomas L. Callaway; Richard Kooris
- Edited by: Mark Coffey; Mel Rodriguez; Mark Scheib
- Music by: Deborah Lurie
- Distributed by: Lionsgate
- Release date: March 12, 2005 (South by Southwest)
- Running time: 83 minutes
- Country: United States
- Language: English

Drop Dead Sexy is a 2005 American comedy film starring Jason Lee and Crispin Glover.

== Plot ==
When their money scam goes into the ground, two would-be thieves turn to kidnapping in an attempt to blackmail their target.

== Cast ==
- Jason Lee as Frank
- Crispin Glover as Eddie
- Pruitt Taylor Vince as "Spider"
- Melissa Keller as Crystal
- Audrey Marie Anderson as Natalie
- Lin Shaye as Ma Muzzy
- Xander Berkeley as Harkness
- Burton Gilliam as "Big Tex"
- Joseph D. Reitman as "Tiny"
- Diane Klimaszewski as Brandy
- Elaine Klimaszewski as Amber
- Brad Dourif as Herman
- Amber Heard as Candy
- Suzanna Urszuly as Sky
