= Broken Bow (Star Trek: Enterprise) =

- Star Trek: Enterprise episodes
- Episode nos.: Season 1 Episodes 1 and 2
- Directed by: James Conway
- Written by: Rick Berman; Brannon Braga
- Production code: 40358-721 (101-102)
- Original air date: September 26, 2001

Guest appearances
- John Fleck - Silik; Melinda Clarke - Sarin; Tommy Lister, Jr. - Klaang; Vaughn Armstrong - Admiral Forrest; Jim Beaver - Admiral Daniel Leonard; Mark Moses - Henry Archer; Gary Graham - Ambassador Soval; Thomas Kopache - Vulcan Attache Tos; Jim Fitzpatrick - Commander Williams; James Horan - Humanoid Figure; Joseph Ruskin - Suliban Doctor; Marty Davis - Young Jonathan Archer; Ron King - Farmer; Ricky Luna - Carlos; Chelsea Bond - Alien Mother; Ethan Dampf - Alien Child; Diane Klimaszewski - Dancer; Elaine Klimaszewski - Dancer; James Cromwell - Doctor Zefram Cochrane (uncredited); Byron Thames - Crewman; Peter Henry Schroeder - Klingon Chancellor; Matt Williamson - Klingon Council Member

Episode chronology
← Previous —	Next → "Fight or Flight"
- Star Trek: Enterprise season 1

"Broken Bow" is the two-part series premiere of the science fiction television series Enterprise (later renamed Star Trek: Enterprise). It originally aired as a double-length episode, but was split into two parts for syndication, though releases on home media and streaming maintain its original one-episode format. The episode aired on UPN on September 26, 2001. A novelization of the episode, written by Diane Carey, was published in 2001. The episode won the 2002 Emmy Award for Outstanding Special Visual Effects for a Series, and was also nominated for sound editing and make-up.

The events of the episode occur nine decades since Zefram Cochrane produced humans' first warp flight (as seen in the film Star Trek: First Contact). The episode sees the launch of Earth's first starship of exploration, Enterprise NX-01. Commanded by Captain Jonathan Archer, and against the objections of the Vulcans, it departs on an urgent mission to return an injured Klingon to Qo'noS, the Klingon homeworld, but come into conflict with the Suliban.

== Plot ==
=== Part 1 ===
On Earth in 2121, a young Jonathan Archer is painting a model spaceship with his father, Henry, principal designer of Earth's first Warp 5 engine. Without fully understanding the reasons behind the Vulcans' constraint, he believes that there must be an explanation for holding the human space program back.

Thirty years later, in 2151, a Klingon named Klaang crashes in Broken Bow, Oklahoma. (Note: This episode only says that the crash was in "Broken Bow"; however, in "Detained", there is a reference to this incident having taken place in Oklahoma.) He kills his two Suliban pursuers, but is then critically wounded by a farmer. Archer, now Captain of the soon-to-be-launched prototype starship Enterprise NX-01, is called to Starfleet Headquarters, where he discusses the incident with Admiral Forrest and Vulcan ambassador Soval. The Vulcans wish to delay the launch of Enterprise. Archer, after consulting with the Denobulan Doctor Phlox, convinces Forrest to allow the new ship to take Klaang to Qo'noS.

Prior to departure, Archer seeks additional crewmembers, including Phlox and linguist Hoshi Sato, while Sub-Commander T'Pol is assigned as their "Vulcan liaison". Meanwhile, on a Suliban vessel somewhere, Silik, leader of the Suliban Cabal, speaks with a mysterious, nameless humanoid figure from their future. The figure orders Silik to recover Klaang. On Enterprise Klaang regains consciousness, but the universal translator does not allow Archer and Sato to communicate with him effectively. Suddenly, Suliban attack the ship and main power is disrupted. During the chaos, one intruder is killed and Klaang is kidnapped.

Later, in Sickbay, Phlox shows Archer the autopsied Suliban corpse, and points out several genetic enhancements. Sato completes a translation of Klaang's speech, and keywords reveal that T'Pol has been withholding information about the Vulcan investigation, including the fact that Klaang had been on Rigel X. Meanwhile, an alien officer aboard the Suliban complex interrogates Klaang in the Klingon language. Arriving at the Rigel X Trade Complex, Archer, Sato, Tucker, and T'Pol are seized by Suliban agents.

=== Part 2 ===
Sarin, once a member of the Suliban Cabal, tells Archer that she gave Klaang a message to the High Council with proof of Suliban involvement in attacks on Klingon factions, and that the enhanced Suliban are following orders in a Temporal Cold War. Suliban from the Cabal show up, and attack, Silik kills Sarin and Archer is shot, but the away team escape back to Enterprise. T'Pol modifies Enterprise's sensors to track the Suliban vessel that attacked them, and they follow it to a gas giant. Meanwhile, aboard the alien complex, Silik talks with the mysterious figure again.

Within the gas giant is the Helix, a Suliban structure composed of hundreds of Suliban cell ships, which the Enterprise crew scan to find Klaang. Using the grappler, Enterprise grabs an attacking Suliban ship, the pilot ejecting. After studying the captured ship and its controls, Archer and Tucker pilot it to the Helix. Becoming separated, Tucker returns with Klaang to Enterprise. After a brief physical confrontation between Archer and Silik in a temporally altered audience room, Tucker uses Enterprise's new transporter to beam Archer out of the Helix.

They deliver Klaang and his message (encoded as DNA in his blood) to Qo'noS and the Klingon Chancellor and Council. Archer tells Tucker and T'Pol that Starfleet has ordered them to continue their mission. After reconsidering his preconceptions of Vulcans, he also invites T'Pol to stay on board and she agrees to ask permission.

== Production ==
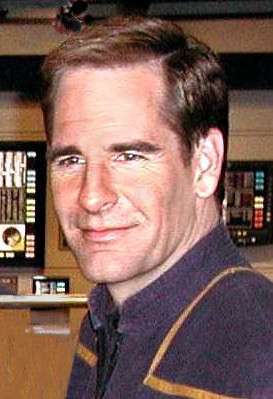
Scott Bakula stars as the Captain of NX-01 Enterprise, Jonathan Archer

Production began on Monday, May 14, 2001, and saw the return of many crew with past experience on the Star Trek franchise. Director James L. Conway had previously directed various episodes of Star Trek across the different series, and was offered the chance to direct the first episode of Enterprise by Rick Berman. Conway thought the script was fantastic and wanted to do the episode, but at that time he was executive vice-president at Spelling Entertainment, and had to ask Aaron Spelling and Duke Vincent for permission for a leave of absence to do it. Conway said it was the best experience he ever had directing a TV show. They had a long 32-day filming schedule, and a huge budget. All the sets had to be built, costumes and props had to be made, and all the setup costs of the show were included in the budget of the premiere. He also knew many of the crew from his previous work. Conway described himself as "a fan first and a director second" and he hoped that he did justice to the scripts and brought enthusiasm to every episode he did. Conway returned to direct several more Enterprise episodes, including "In a Mirror, Darkly" Part 1. Returning crew included First Assistant Director (1st AD) Jerry Fleck, Director of Photography (DP) Marvin V. Rush, and Visual Effects Supervisor Ronald B. Moore, all whom had been with the franchise since The Next Generation. Michael Okuda continued as Scenic Arts Supervisor, and as technical consultant to the writing staff. Production designers Herman Zimmerman and John Eaves also worked to create the look of the new series.

The episode introduces much of the cast of Enterprise, which remains for the rest of the show; it also has many guest stars. James Cromwell reprises the character Zefram Cochrane (uncredited), having previously played this character in the 1996 film Star Trek: First Contact. Klaang, the crash-landed Klingon was played by Tommy "Tiny" Lister Jr. John Fleck played the Suliban leader Sillik. Starfleet personnel, Admiral Forrest, Admiral Daniel Leonard and Commander Williams, were played by Vaughn Armstrong, Jim Beaver and Jim Fitzpatrick, respectively. Their characters were named after actors Leonard Nimoy, DeForest Kelley and William Shatner. This was Armstrong's ninth of twelve different characters on Star Trek. Vulcans are played by Gary Graham as Soval, and Thomas Kopache as Tos. The character name "Tos" is another nod to The Original Series, commonly abbreviated as "TOS". The butterfly dancers at Rigel X were played by the Klimaszewski Twins, Diane and Elaine. In Part 2, the Suliban female Sarin was played by Melinda Clarke, and the mysterious "Humanoid Figure" was played by James Horan.

== Release ==
The premiere of "Broken Bow" was at the Paramount Theatre on September 20, 2001. It was attended by the cast and crew of Enterprise, as well as several from Star Trek: Voyager and Star Trek: The Next Generation. It was first aired on UPN on September 26, 2001. The broadcast saw the episode come in first place during the timeslot, with 16 million viewers watching, with an average of 12 million. This was slightly lower than the premiere of Voyager but represented an increase of 42% over the final episode "Endgame", and was the best ratings for any series on that the channel since Voyager.

In the UK, "Broken Bow" first broadcast on satellite TV channel Sky One, before airing on Channel 4 during July 2002.

This episode was released as part of Enterprise season one, which was released in high definition on Blu-ray disc on March 26, 2013; it has 1080p video and a DTS-HD Master Audio sound track.

On the launch of the Paramount+ streaming service, on March 4, 2021, a one-day only free Star Trek marathon was presented, featuring the first episodes of the various Star Trek television series, including "Broken Bow". The marathon started at 7 am PT/10 am ET and was live streamed on the YouTube internet video platform, going through each episode chronologically in order of release, with "Broken Bow" airing after "Caretaker".

== Reception ==
The episode received positive reviews from critics. Ron Wertheimer of The New York Times gave the episode a positive review, saying: "Enterprise gets back to basics, then improves on them." David Segal of The Washington Post was critical of the first episode, saying that "the script is riddled with clunkers and jargon" and that the show "has a bargain-basement feel that lands just this side of camp; the space fights aren't much more convincing than PlayStation offerings. And everything is wrapped in a trite message about unity and the importance of getting along." Laura Fries of Variety says the prequel setting "rejuvenates a somewhat tired notion" but also says "viewers are reminded that this is more akin to their father's Star Trek." She praised Bakula for bringing "an earthy quality back" to the captain, making him "personable and accessible". Howard Rosenberg of the Los Angeles Times predicted that Star Trek fans would either "raise the bar impossibly high for this series or watch it because they watch everything with this brand" but as a casual viewer he found the premiere "mildly entertaining, but mostly plays rather tepidly, its occasional glints of intellect pushed far into the background by action." Allan Johnson of the Chicago Tribune was positive about the series as an accessible entry point for potential new fans. Entertainment Weekly gave it a grade B+, and said it was "appealing to both Trekkies and non-fans of this pop-cultural institution". Hal Boedeker of the Orlando Sentinel called the story "a standard adventure" and was critical of action sequences as "familiar" and that "it goes boldly and unapologetically where dozens of series have gone before." He praised Blalock for her performance: "Star Trek purists might not be amused, but the captivating Blalock energizes the franchise. Enterprise needs every bit of pizazz she can supply." Aint It Cool News gave the episode four out of five, praised Blalock for her performance, and said: "Clearly, an extraordinary amount of love and attention went into this endeavor, from the propulsive teleplay to the careful casting to the world-beating production design." IGN rated it three out of five, and wrote: "There's enough new, interesting stuff there to make me want to see more." Tor.com rated it five out of ten.

A review of the Blu-ray release by Blu-ray.com, commented on the visuals, remarking: "The scene in Brazil in "Broken Bow" does offer some nicely brilliant greens, and certainly some scattered traces of good, honest colors are seen throughout, but mostly this is a very uninspired palette", and also pointing out the special effects are in lower resolution than HD that causes some "jagged edges, and lack crisp details." They were more positive about the audio, remarking of the surround sound track: "The controversial theme song has never sounded better. It's rich, full of life, and with well-defined vocals and precise instrument clarity and reproduction. Much of the action on board the NX-01 is brought to life by the subtle, deep hum of the engines and the little odds and ends sound elements that define the atmosphere."

=== Accolades ===
"Broken Bow" was nominated for three Emmy Awards. It was nominated in the categories Outstanding Makeup For A Series (Prosthetic) and Outstanding Sound Editing For A Series, and it won the award for Outstanding Special Visual Effects For A Series.

In 2014, The A.V. Club include this episode on their list of the ten episodes that best represented the series. The double-episode was praised for establishing most of the key ideas that would drive the show. "It's a faltering beginning, but it hints at the potential Enterprise would spend seasons trying to realize." In 2015 Wired said that when the NX-01 leaves space dry dock for the first time is the best moment in the whole series. In 2016, SyFy ranked "Broken Bow" as the third best out of six Star Trek pilot episodes. In 2017, GameSpot ranked this as the fourth best pilot episode of any Star Trek series.

In 2016, The Hollywood Reporter rated "Broken Bow" the 80th best episode of all Star Trek episodes, IGN ranked it the 21st best episode of all Star Trek, while Empire ranked it the 37th best out of all Star Trek television episodes. In 2020, Screen Rant ranked "Broken Bow" the fourth best episode of all Star Trek franchise television episodes. (Note: Four years later, the episode was dropped in a 2024 update from Screen Rant, despite the list being expanded from "The 15 Best Episodes In Star Trek TV History, Ranked" to "20 Best Episodes Of Star Trek In TV History, Ranked", leaving no episodes from Star Trek: Enterprise on the expanded list.)

== Novelization ==
Broken Bow
- Author: Diane Carey
- Language: English
- Series: Star Trek: Enterprise
- Genre: Science fiction novel
- Publisher: Pocket Books
- Publication date: 1 October 2001 (hardback); 1 June 2003 (paperback)
- Publication place: United States
- Media type: Print (Paperback, Hardback)
- Pages: 282 pages
- ISBN: 0-7434-4862-6 (first edition, hardback); ISBN 0-7434-7062-1 (paperback)
- OCLC: 48183555
- Dewey Decimal: 813/.54 21
- LC Class: PS3553.A6684 B76 2001
- Text: Broken Bow at Internet Archive

A 240-page novelization written by Diane Carey was published in 2001 by Pocket Books. Carey was given only the script and wrote the novel without any further information from the production team. She said would normally take about two weeks to write a novelization, but that Broken Bow was written in just four days. In the Season 1 DVD special features, producers Rick Berman and Brannon Braga discussed how Diane Carey used the character's internal monologues to frequently criticize the script. It was Carey's last Star Trek novel.
