= Jonathan Archer =

Fictional character from Star Trek: Enterprise

- Star Trek character
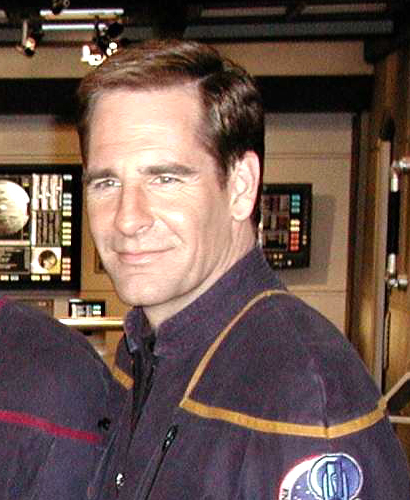
- Scott Bakula as Captain Jonathan Archer
- First appearance: "Broken Bow" (2001)
- Last appearance: "These Are the Voyages..." (2005)
- Created by: Rick Berman; Brannon Braga
- Portrayed by: Scott Bakula

In-universe information
- Species: Human
- Gender: Male
- Title(s): Captain; Admiral
- Occupation: Commanding Officer, Enterprise (NX-01); Chief of Staff, Starfleet Command; Ambassador to Andoria; Federation Councilman; President of the United Federation of Planets
- Family: Henry Archer (father); Sally Archer (mother)
- Nationality: American
- Origin: Earth
- Born: August 4, 2112 upstate New York

Jonathan Archer is a fictional character in the Star Trek franchise. He is one of the protagonists of the television series Star Trek: Enterprise, where he was portrayed by Scott Bakula.

Archer was the commanding officer of the first starship Enterprise (NX-01) from 2151 to 2161. Archer also played a major role in the formation of Starfleet and the United Federation of Planets, and was later President of the United Federation of Planets from 2184 to 2192. According to a computer display in the episode "In a Mirror, Darkly", historian John Gill considered Archer "the greatest explorer of the 22nd century."

== Biography ==
=== History ===
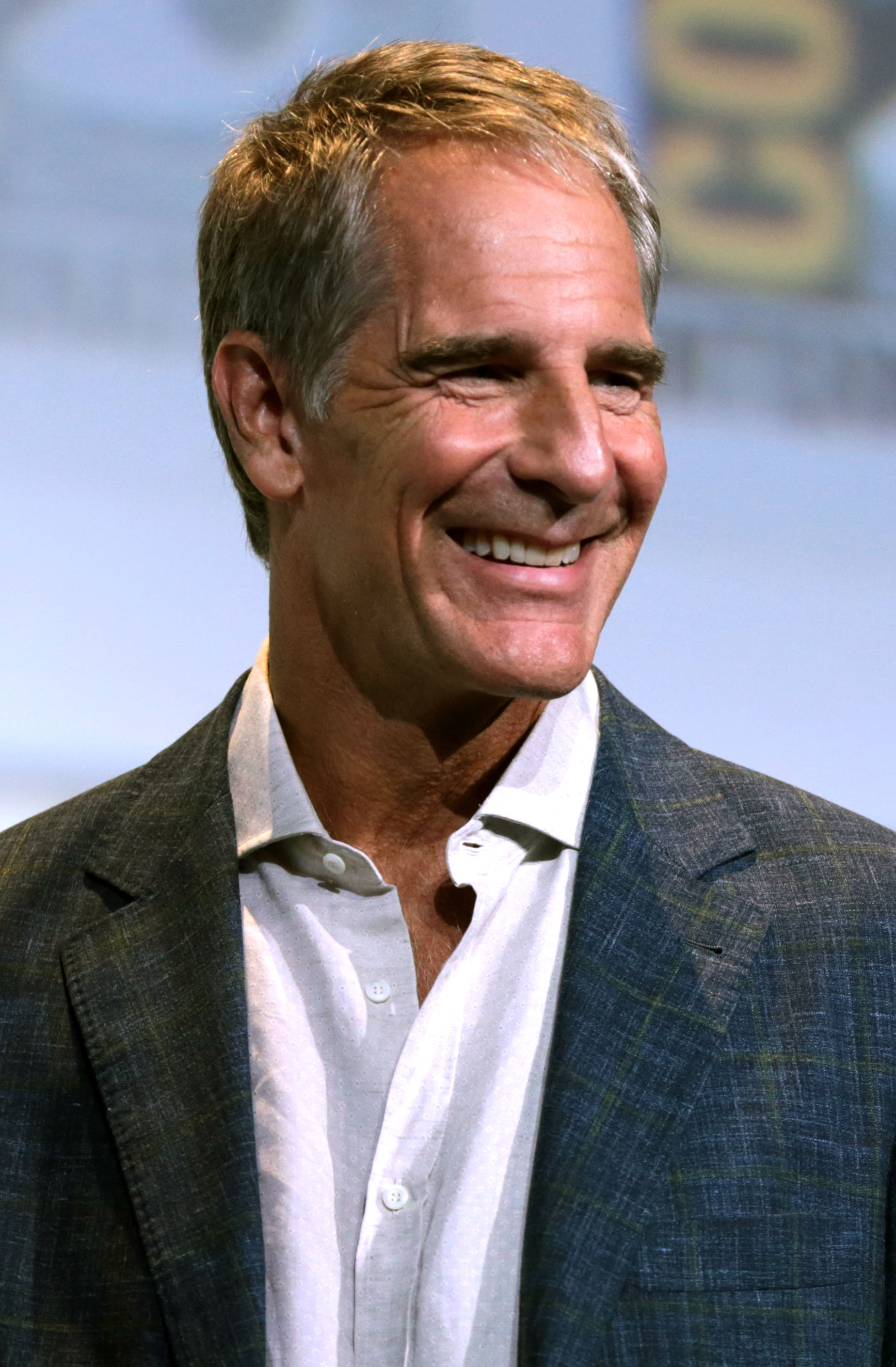
Actor Scott Bakula portrayed Archer.

Archer, the son of famed warp engineer Henry Archer and his wife Sally, was born on August 4, 2112, in Upstate New York, where he spent most of his formative years; he later claimed to have spent the majority of his life in San Francisco. The second-season episode "First Flight" depicts in flashback that he spent many years as a test pilot in the nascent Starfleet's NX program, based in San Francisco. His dreams of exploring started as a boy. As a youth, Archer earned the Eagle Scout Award, along with 26 merit badges, from the Boy Scouts of America. (Mentioned in the episode "Rogue Planet".) He is an avid water polo fan, and often relaxes by watching water polo games.

Archer grew up with a distrust of Vulcans, perceiving them as having held back humanity's progress, particularly with regard to his father's warp five project. As a commander, Archer served as a test-pilot in the NX warp trials with A.G. Robinson, Duvall and Gardner. (All mentioned in the episode "First Flight". It is assumed it is this Gardner who becomes Admiral when Maxwell Forrest dies in "The Forge".) Robinson pushed the limits of a test ship, the NX-Alpha, resulting in its destruction. The Vulcans recommended terminating the warp trials, which Starfleet agreed to, until Charles Tucker III (who would later serve as chief engineer under Archer) fixed the intermix ratios, and Archer and Robinson took the NX-Beta, the second test ship, without clearance to prove its readiness. The suspension of Archer did not completely stop the progress of the Enterprise's construction, as the program eventually resumed after a six-month halt.

=== Seasons 1 and 2 ===
As a man who loves to travel amongst the stars, Archer learns that being captain is a larger duty than manager and astronomer. He and his crew encounter species from all over the quadrant. The Enterprise sometimes comes under attack, although the motivations of their attackers are not always clear. Encounters with the Mazarites, Xindi, Tholians, Suliban and Klingons motivate Archer to become more of a military commander.

In addition, Archer learns that the duties of captain include being a diplomat. During Seasons 1 and 2, he is somewhat uncomfortable with this role, especially in the episode "A Night in Sickbay" when his pet beagle, Porthos, contracts a deadly illness on an alien world.

While exploring, Archer becomes an enemy of the Klingons. In a dispute with the Klingon Empire in 2152, he is convicted and sentenced to exile on Rura Penthe, even though he is innocent of the charges and despite the Klingons having acknowledged his previous service to the Empire. With his escape, a bounty is put on Archer's head and tensions with the Klingon Empire increase.

Also during this period, Archer has the distinction of making Earth's official first contact with dozens of alien races, including the Akaali, the Andorians, Axanar, Suliban, Tandarans, Tellarites, Tholians, Xindi and Romulans (the latter in audio only, because during Kirk's time, it is stated that humans have never set eyes on a Romulan).

=== Temporal Cold War ===
Although initially optimistic, Archer becomes involved in his first mission as captain of Enterprise in the middle of the Temporal Cold War. The Temporal Cold War begins at the beginning of the pilot episode, "Broken Bow". In that episode, the audience is introduced to the Suliban and a mysterious being from the future (informally referred to as "Future Guy") who is guiding them.

As the Temporal Cold War continues, Archer also meets Daniels, whose purpose seemingly is to safeguard Archer in particular and Enterprise in general. Daniels' comments are that Archer will be the man who helps form the United Federation of Planets, and it becomes apparent by the third season that Daniels is representing the Federation throughout the Temporal Cold War.

=== Season 3 ===
In Season 3, Archer is Earth's military commander in the Expanse. Following the Xindi attack on Earth in 2153, Archer becomes a changed man. No longer a congenial captain, he is now driven and determined to seek out and confront the perpetrators. Archer commits desperate, controversial acts of questionable morality to ensure a future for Earth, including torturing a prisoner, cloning Tucker to harvest body parts to save the chief engineer and thus killing the clone, and stealing a vital warp coil and leaving a ship of aliens stranded in space.

While on his mission to locate the Xindi, Archer is briefly transformed into a member of the extinct Loque'eque by a mutagenic virus. Later, he is infected by subspace parasites, creating an alternate timeline in which the Enterprise's mission fails and the Xindi succeed in destroying Earth (although the nature of these parasites mean that this timeline is erased when Phlox's cure for Archer erases the parasites themselves from history). With the help of Daniels, Archer, along with T'Pol, travels back in time to the year 2004 to prevent the release of a Xindi-Reptilian bio-weapon.

By the end of the season, Archer is presumed dead when the Xindi superweapon is destroyed, after having convinced three of the five Xindi races that reports of humanity's future conflict with them are wrong. However, in reality, he is transported back to the early 1940s during World War II, as is the Enterprise.

=== Season 4 ===
After returning home in 2154, Archer helps a faction of Vulcans fight an oppressive government on their planet. During this incident, he is the recipient of the katra, or living spirit, of the great Vulcan philosopher Surak. The katra is later transferred to a Vulcan priest, and Archer is left unharmed. This leads to the reformation of Vulcan society, and explains why the Vulcans of Archer's time were so different from the Vulcans of Kirk's time. In the process, Archer becomes the first known Human participant in a Vulcan mind meld. Since that experience, he has used that knowledge at least once: To assist T'Pol with conducting her first mind meld to gain information about who kidnapped Dr. Phlox (the episode "Affliction").

Archer is also involved in one of the first, and possibly most significant, treaties yet, being asked to escort Gral, the Tellarite ambassador, to the Tellarite-Andorian negotiations. En route, he and his crew run into the Andorian Shran, a long-time friend/enemy/ally. During Shran's stay, Romulans attack and cause the fragile alliance to crash to a halt. In the mix-up, a Tellarite kills Shran's lover Talas, and Shran avenges her death by demanding the Tellarite who killed her to fight to the death. In an attempt to protect the fragile peace treaty, Archer takes the challenge instead and Shran is incapacitated. The alliance remains intact, and soon evolves into the United Federation of Planets. ("Babel One", "United", "The Aenar", "Demons", "Terra Prime", "These Are the Voyages...").

=== Place in history ===
The time traveler Daniels reveals that Archer would eventually have a major role in the founding of the United Federation of Planets in 2161. He briefly takes Archer ahead in time to the point where Archer is about to sign the Federation accords on Earth, expanded further in the series finale.

Archer's fate is revealed in the episode "In a Mirror, Darkly, Part II" when a computer information screen aboard the 23rd century Starfleet vessel USS Defiant is briefly visible. According to the computer profile, Archer was an Admiral and Chief of Staff at Starfleet Command at the time of his retirement. He later went on to serve as ambassador to Andoria from 2165 to 2175. From 2175 to 2183, Archer served as a member of the Federation Council, followed by eight years as Federation President (2184–2192). He was also an honorary member of the Andorian Imperial Guard. Historian John Gill considered Archer "the greatest explorer of the 22nd century." The same computer display states that Archer's Planet and Archer IV (mentioned in "Yesterday's Enterprise" and "Strange New World" respectively) were named after him.

Unused production artwork would have shown that Archer dies peacefully in his sleep at his home in Upstate New York in 2245, exactly one day after he attends the commissioning ceremony of the USS Enterprise. However, this biographical computer display contained a number of discrepancies, including listing 2160 as the year that Archer's captaincy of Enterprise came to an end. The series later established that Archer's command ended in 2161, as seen in the series finale, "These Are the Voyages...".

At least three starships were named after him: the Archer-class scout ship featured in the tie-in novel series Star Trek: Vanguard and its follow-up Star Trek: Seekers, an unspecified ship alluded to in Star Trek: Nemesis and the USS Archer NCC-627 in the pilot episode of Star Trek: Strange New Worlds. Archer Spacedock from Star Trek: Discovery is also named for Jonathan Archer.

The 2009 Star Trek film briefly references Archer, as Montgomery Scott receives punishment stemming from an incident involving a transporter and "Admiral Archer's prized beagle." There was some confusion as to if this actually referred to Jonathan Archer himself as this would make him 141 years old. Star Trek writer Bob Orci went on record to clear up the issue, "Admiral Archer is a reference to the Archer we all know and love, and yes he would be over 100, which is a likely life expectancy in a futuristic space-faring race of humans (as depicted by McCoy's (DeForest Kelley, playing the 137-year-old Admiral) appearance in The Next Generation.)"

In the Star Trek: Discovery episode "Choose Your Pain", Archer is shown listed on the Starfleet Database as one of Starfleet's most decorated Captains as of 2256. Also included in the list are: Robert April, Matthew Decker, Philippa Georgiou, and Christopher Pike.

=== Porthos ===
Porthos is Archer's dog. One of four males born in a litter of English Beagles, Porthos and his brothers, Athos, Aramis and d'Artagnan, were named after characters from The Three Musketeers by Alexandre Dumas, père. He has been Archer's faithful companion since the age of six weeks, and has remained so for the duration of Archer's 10-year assignment as captain of Enterprise.

Porthos was portrayed by a male beagle named Prada in Season 1. Afterwards, he was played by a further two female beagles, Breezy and Windy, although the character of Porthos remained male.

Archer would occasionally leave Porthos in the care of Dr. Phlox when he was away or otherwise unavailable.

Archer cares very much for Porthos. In the pilot episode, Travis Mayweather says Archer won't use the transporter for himself and certainly not for his dog. In "A Night in Sickbay", Porthos nearly dies when he contracts a deadly pathogen on the Kreetassan homeworld, but is saved when Phlox transplants a gland from a chameleon-like creature.

In "Similitude", Archer explains in answer to the question "Can he do any tricks?" that "I haven't taught him any, mostly what he does is eat, sleep and not fetch." He also commented "there's nothing Porthos likes more than dinner time".

Although Porthos is not the first domesticated pet to be featured in a Star Trek series (Data owned a cat, Spot, in Star Trek: The Next Generation and Captain Jean-Luc Picard owned a lionfish named Livingston), Porthos has the distinction of being the first pet to maintain an ongoing presence in the series, and even – as illustrated above – become the focus of an episode.

In the Mirror Universe depicted in "In a Mirror, Darkly", Porthos is a Rottweiler. According to the episode's podcast on Startrek.com, the dog that portrayed the mirror Porthos was known on set as an even bigger "baby" than the dogs which have played the regular Porthos. Episode writer Mike Sussman noted that the animal was "The sweetest dog I have ever met."

In the episode "Acquisition", Porthos was interrogated by a group of Ferengi pirates while the rest of the crew were incapacitated, but the aliens' universal translator could not decipher his barking. The pirates didn't know what to make of the dog, even speculating that he was perhaps food. They then decided they could sell him to a zoo.

Brannon Braga's nephew had a dog named Porthos, which he thought was good name for a dog and took as inspiration for Archer's dog.

== Mirror Universe ==
In the Mirror Universe, Jonathan Archer is first officer of the ISS Enterprise with the rank of Commander. In this universe, he serves under the command of Captain Maximilian Forrest, the alternate version of Admiral Maxwell Forrest. In contrast to the "normal" Trek universe, where Forrest and Archer are close friends, the mirror versions of the characters do not get along well at all.

Like most characters in the Terran Empire, the mirror Archer is treacherous, cunning and scheming. He leads a mutiny against Forrest and takes over Enterprise. However, with the help of T'Pol and other Vulcans, Forrest is freed and retakes the ship. Archer surrenders, but had locked the ship's navigation controls so its heading could not be altered. His reason for the mutiny is brought to light as he had been informed about a ship that seemed to be from another dimension. With the ship's course unable to be changed and Starfleet now intrigued by what Archer has learned, Forrest is ordered to investigate. He also has Archer punished in the Agony Booth for a then record ten hours, giving the Commander only one hour to clean up and get ready for a staff meeting after his release. On arrival, they discover the USS Defiant, a Starfleet ship from 100 years into the future of the "normal" universe.

Archer leads an away team to take control of the Defiant while the Enterprise is destroyed by the Tholians. He and his team, plus survivors from the Enterprise, discover the Defiant was not only from another dimension, but the future and that the alternate dimension never had a Terran Empire. After successfully crushing a rebellion against the Empire, Archer attempts to take the future vessel to Earth where he plans to proclaim himself Emperor. However, before he can do so, he is killed by his universe's Hoshi Sato, who poisons him, takes the ship and claims the Terran throne for herself.

== Reception ==
In 2019, Vulture ranked Captain Archer as the 8th Star Trek captain by their selection criterion, a combination of competency and managerial style. They note Archer as being interested in exploration, but also having a relaxed attitude and that he also enjoys spending times with friends and his pet dog. Space.com rated Archer as the sixth best captain of Star Trek. The Washington Post ranked Archer as the seventh best Captain of Star Trek.

Screen Rant rated Archer as the fourth best captain, noting that he had to pioneer space without the benefit of the institutions he helped to create, and noted his ability to take on challenges. CBR ranked Archer as the 5th best member of Starfleet 2018, in between Spock (#6) and Captain Janeway (#4) in their ranking.

In 2018, The Wrap ranked Archer as the 29th best main cast character of Star Trek overall. In 2016, Captain Archer was ranked as the 9th most important character of Starfleet within the Star Trek science fiction universe by Wired.

== See also ==
- List of Star Trek: Enterprise characters
