= Hoshi Sato =

Fictional character from Star Trek: Enterprise

- Star Trek character
- Linda Park as Hoshi Sato
- First appearance: "Broken Bow" (2001)
- Last appearance: "These Are the Voyages..." (2005)
- Created by: Rick Berman; Brannon Braga
- Portrayed by: Linda Park

In-universe information
- Species: Human
- Affiliation: Starfleet
- Posting: Communications officer, Enterprise (NX-01)
- Rank: Ensign

Hoshi Sato /ˈhoʊʃi ˈsɑːtoʊ/, played by Korean American actress Linda Park, is a fictional character in the science fiction television series Star Trek: Enterprise.

In the show Sato, born in Kyoto, Japan on July 9, 2129, is the communications officer aboard the starship Enterprise (NX-01), and a linguist who can speak more than forty languages (polyglotism), including Klingon. She is an acknowledged linguistic genius and expert at operating the universal translator, a key instrument in allowing the crew to communicate with alien cultures.

== Biography ==
Relatively little of Sato's background was explored in the series. She briefly suffered from space sickness and claustrophobia. The fourth season episode "Observer Effect" revealed that she was once dishonourably discharged from Starfleet for running a floating poker game and breaking the arm of a Starfleet instructor who tried to break it up (she has a black belt in Aikido). She was subsequently allowed to reenlist because of her exceptional linguistic skills.

Before posting to the Enterprise, she taught linguistics in Brazil; it is not known whether she was an active Starfleet officer at the time, or was reactivated to serve under Jonathan Archer. She later (also in "Observer Effect") expressed regret at leaving without saying goodbye to her students.

== Fate ==
According to a computer bio screen, shown in the episode "In a Mirror, Darkly", and taken from the memory banks of the USS Defiant, Sato was born in Kyoto, Japan. She was instrumental in the development of the universal translator. She eventually marries a man named Takashi Kimura, and retires from Starfleet with the rank of lieutenant commander.

== Mirror Universe ==
In the Mirror Universe, Sato held the rank of Lieutenant. In addition to being the communications officer, she acted as the "Captain's Woman" (a combination yeoman/concubine) of Captain Maximillian Forrest and then Commander Jonathan Archer after Archer took control of the ISS Enterprise.

After Archer used the USS Defiant to put down the rebellion, Sato poisoned him and took command of the ship, taking the Mirror Travis Mayweather as a new consort. Upon reaching Earth, she demanded Earth's surrender and proclaimed herself Empress.

== Key episodes ==
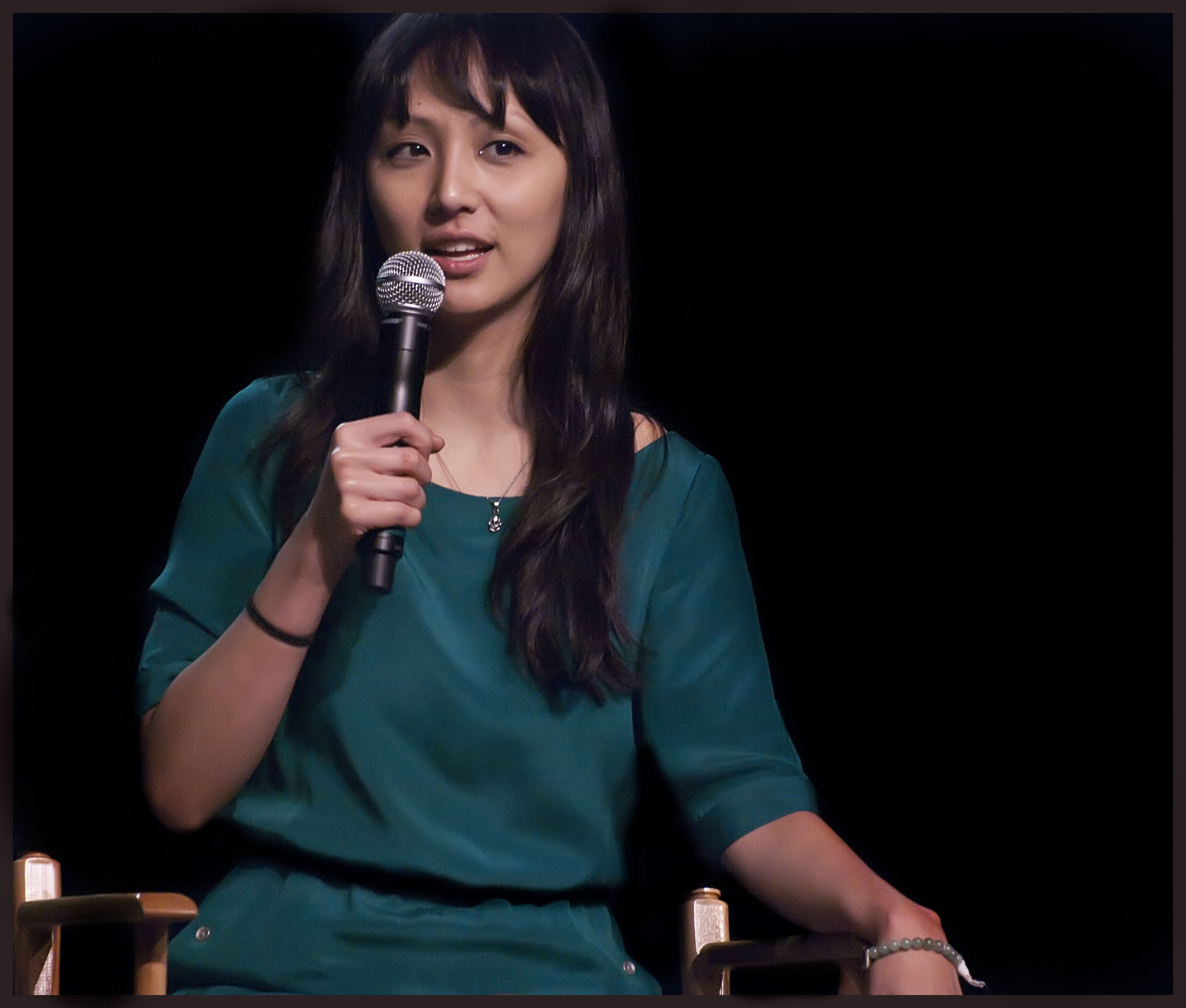
Actress Linda Park, cast as Hoshi Sato, said "Fight or Flight" showed how her character grew during the series

Episodes in which Sato's character is expanded or plays a key role:

- "Broken Bow" – Introduction to Sato's character; assigned to Enterprise
- "Fight or Flight" – Sato faces her fears on an alien ship whose crew was murdered.
- "Vanishing Point" – Her first use of the transporter
- "Exile" – She remains on an alien planet to learn more about the Xindi.
- "The Council" – Vital in communicating with the Xindi council
- "Countdown" – Kidnapped and tortured by Xindi-Reptilians, she is brainwashed to assist in destruction of Earth.
- "Zero Hour" – Crucial in the destruction of the Xindi superweapon before it can be used to destroy Earth
- "Observer Effect" – Chosen to carry a deadly pathogen in an experiment observed by the Organians
- "In a Mirror, Darkly" – The Sato of the parallel universe is promiscuous, conniving and ambitious, ultimately declaring herself Empress Sato of Earth.

== Reception ==
According to author David Greven, "Ensign Hoshi Sato is an Asian American linguist and the communications officer. Prone to fearful fits and generally seen as ineffectual in any terms other than the linguistic aspects of her job, Hoshi is the resident screamer."

Consulting producer and writer during season 1, Fred Dekker said Hoshi was his favorite character to write for as he felt she was the most human and relatable of the crew.

In 2001 in an interview with Ian Spelling of The New York Times, actress Linda Park who portrays character Hoshi Sato on Enterprise cited "Fight or Flight" as an example of the progression and growth of her character during the series.

In 2004, IGN said "Linda Park is possibly the most under-utilized actor on the show and shows the most potential."

In 2013, Slate magazine ranked Hoshi Sato one of the ten best crew characters in the Star Trek franchise.

In 2015, Den of Geek noted how Hoshi showed the importance of communication and the depth of her linguistic abilities. They recommended the episodes "Fight or Flight" and "Vox Sola" as watches for the Hoshi character.

In 2016, The Wrap ranked Hoshi the 37th, on a list of 39 of the best characters in the Star Trek franchise. They noted her importance as a translator but called her "a poor man's Uhura" and said the writers failed to flesh out the character beyond her basic premise. Wired ranked Lt. Commander Hoshi Sato the 27th-most important Starfleet character in the Star Trek universe.

== See also ==
- List of Star Trek: Enterprise characters
