= Linda Park =

South Korean-born American actress

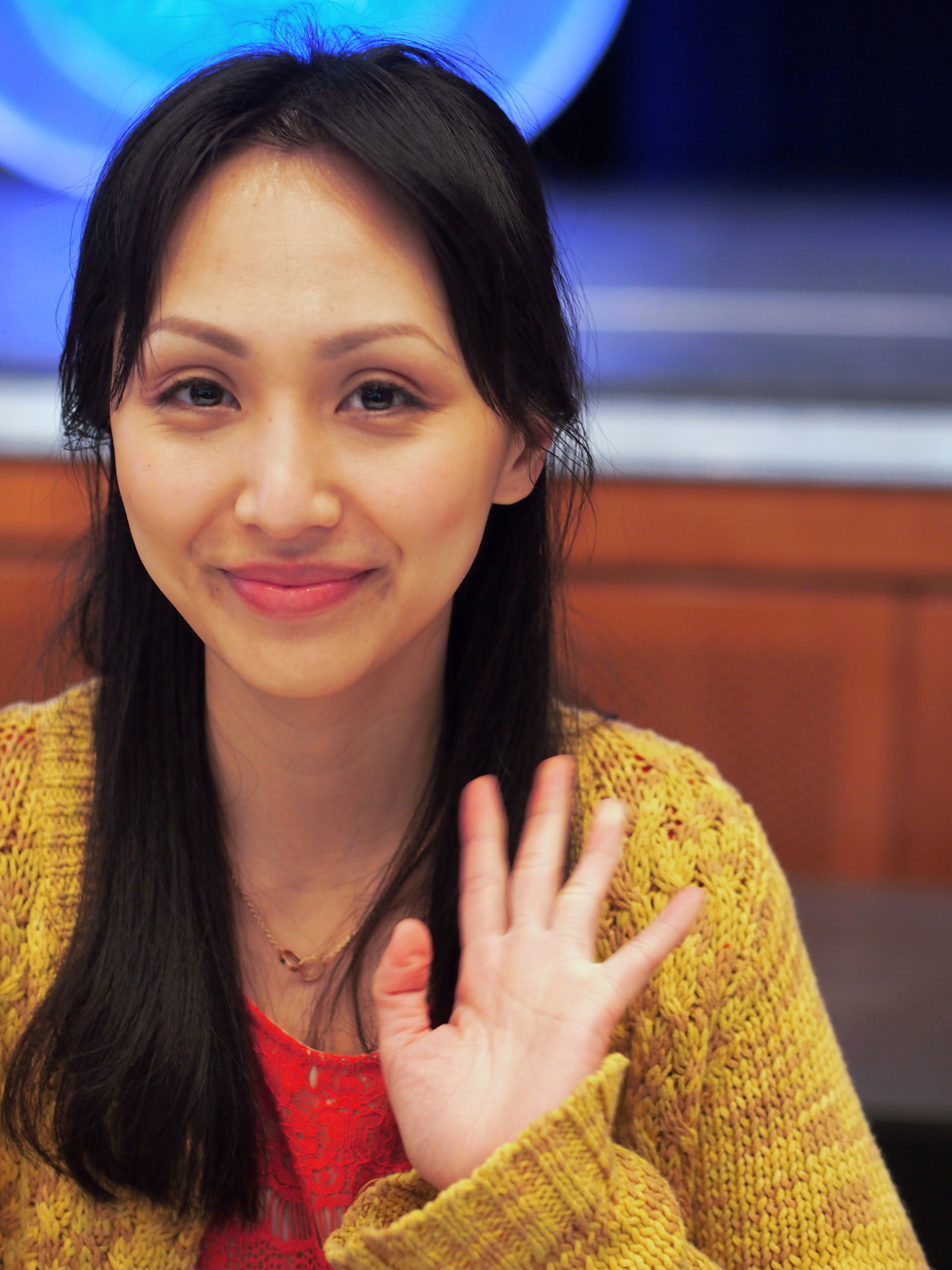
- Park in May 2013
- Born: July 9, 1978 (age 48); Seoul, South Korea
- Education: Boston University (BFA)
- Occupation: Actress
- Years active: 2001–present
- Spouse: Daniel Bess (m. 2014; div. 2022)
- Children: 1

Linda Park (born July 9, 1978) is an American actress. She is best known for playing communications officer Hoshi Sato in the science-fiction series Star Trek: Enterprise.

== Early life ==
Park was born in South Korea and raised in San Jose, California. She participated in a number of theatrical productions in her teens at Notre Dame High School and Bellarmine College Preparatory.

In 2000, she earned a Bachelor of Fine Arts degree from Boston University. During her college career, she spent a semester in England, studying at the London Academy of Music and Dramatic Art and the Royal Academy of Dramatic Art. Her college stage credits included Mad Forest, Lysistrata, Cyrano de Bergerac, Richard III, and The Trojan Women.

== Career ==
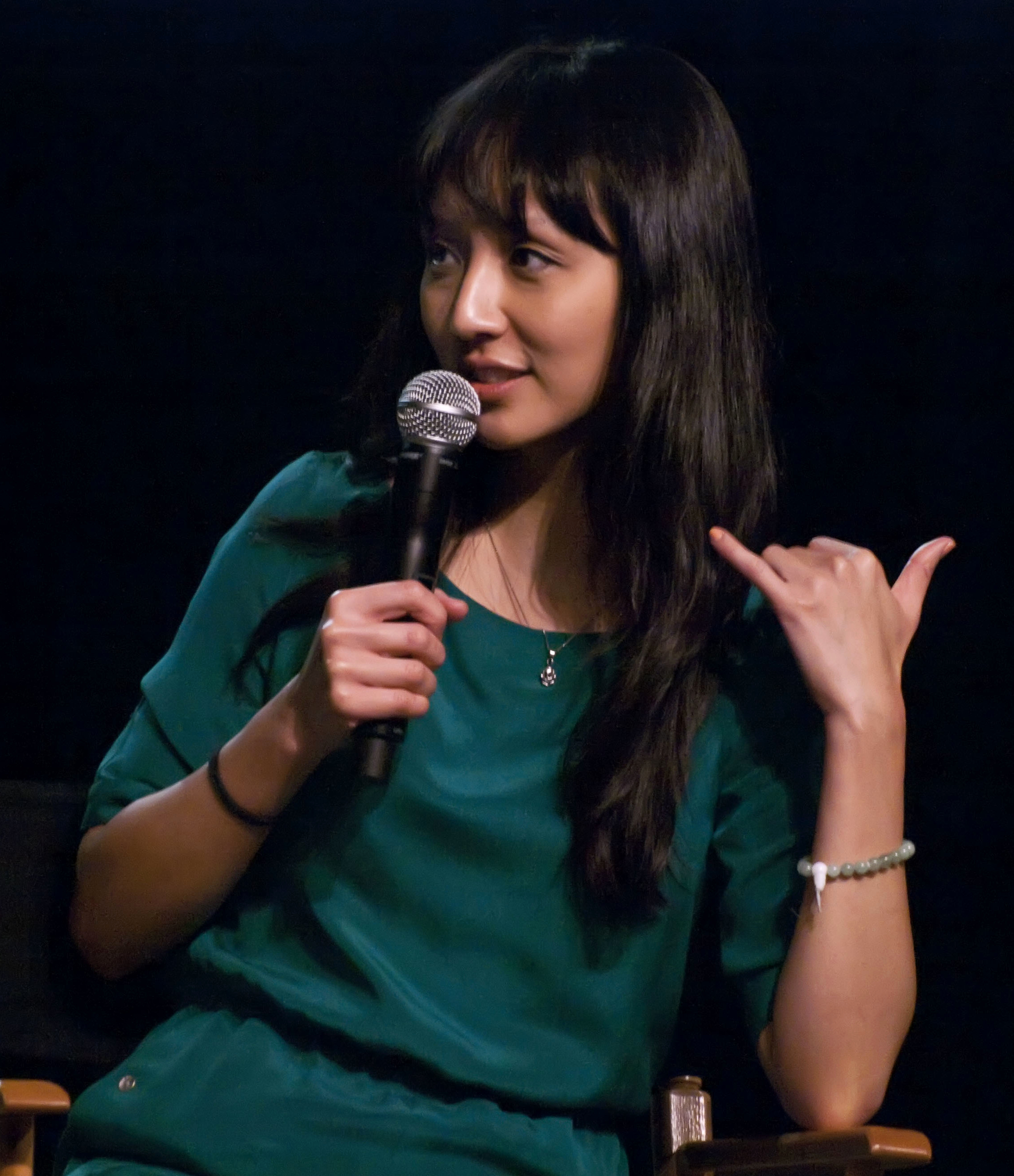
Park at 2009 Las Vegas Star Trek Convention

In 2001, Park had a small role in the feature film Jurassic Park III as the assistant to the character Ellie Sattler.

Also in 2001, less than a year after graduation, she was cast as Hoshi Sato in Star Trek: Enterprise, the sixth series of the Star Trek franchise, which premiered in September 2001. Sato is the ship's communications officer, with a natural gift for translating alien languages. Park herself is fluent in English and Korean, and also speaks some French.

Park produced and starred in her first short film, My Prince, My Angel (2006).

Park is a co-founder of the theater company Underground Asylum (UA). In October 2003, she starred in UA's world premiere of the Mary Fengar Gail one-act play Fuchsia, at The Hudson Theatres in Los Angeles. In 2010, she played Clytemnestra in a production of Agamemnon at the Barbara and Lawrence Fleischman Theater in Los Angeles. In 2011, she played Anne Deever in a production of Arthur Miller's All My Sons at the Matrix Theater in Los Angeles.

In 2009, Park became a series regular in the second season of Crash, playing Maggie Cheon. The show was subsequently cancelled after the death of series lead Dennis Hopper.

== Personal life ==
Park married actor Daniel Bess on October 11, 2014. They had a child together. On February 14, 2024, Park announced that she and Bess had been separated for over a year and had divorced.

Park was diagnosed with lupus in 1997.

Park is an active student of dance, remarking that "dancing has always been my second love". She has continued to study and practice ballet and other dance forms.

== Filmography ==
Film and television
Year	Title	Role	Notes
2001	Popular	Anna Lin	Episode: "Fag"
2001	Jurassic Park III	Hannah	
2001–05	Star Trek: Enterprise	Ensign Hoshi Sato	Main cast
2002	Taken	Party Goer	Uncredited
2004	Spectres	Renee Hansen	
2004	Geldersma	Min	Short film
2006	My Prince, My Angel	Shen	Short film; also producer
2006	Honor	Kate	Drama action film directed by David Worth
2007	Raines	Michelle Lance	
2007–08	Women's Murder Club	Denise Kwon	Main cast
2009	Infestation	Leechee	
2009	Life	Asst. Coroner Debbie Quo	Episode: "5 Quarts"
2009	Law & Order: Special Victims Unit	TARU Tech	Episode: "Liberties"
2009	Crash	Maggie Cheon	Main cast (season 2)
2011	The Mentalist	Dr. Montague	Episode: "Bloodhounds"
2011	House	Dr. Wendy Lee	Episode: "The Fix"
2012	NCIS	Lieutenant Nora Patel	Episode: "Lost at Sea"
2013	Yellow Face	Carla Chang	Comedy film
2013	The Face of Love	Jan	
2014	Legends	Dr. Blair Halstrom	2 episodes
2015	Castle	Inspector Zhang	Episode: "Hong Kong Hustle"
2016	Star Trek: Captain Pike	Captain Grace Shintal	
2016	A Christmas in New York	Courtney Chen	Holiday romance film
2017–20	Bosch	Jun Park	Recurring role (seasons 3–6)
2018	Dear Chickens	Nurse Stephanie	Short film
2018	iZombie	Mrs. Brinks' Chef	Episode: "Blue Bloody"
2018	The Affair	Dr. Woo	Episode: "410"
2018	The Resident	Janine Levasseur	Episode: "Trial & Error"
2019	Lovestruck	Kate	TV movie
2020	Amazing Stories	Dr. Mary Koh	Episode: "Signs of Life"
2020	Grey's Anatomy	Deborah Lee	2 episodes
2020	Unbelievable!!!!!	Amber Earhardt	Space Sci-Fi comedy film
2021	For All Mankind	Amy Chang	Recurring role (season 2)
2021	Fairfax	Joy	3 episodes (voice role)
2022	Dahmer – Monster: The Jeffrey Dahmer Story	Julie Yang	Miniseries, 1 episode
2023	Black Girl Missing	Elise	Lifetime original crime-drama TV movie
2023	Magnum P.I.	Dr. Lim	Episode: "The Retrieval"
2025	The Paper	Casting Director	Episode: "Church and State"
2025	A Man on the Inside	Betsy Muki	Recurring role (season 2)
