= Enterprise (NX-01) =

Fictional spacecraft from Star Trek: Enterprise

Enterprise NX-01
- The starship Enterprise (NX-01)
- First appearance: "Broken Bow"; Star Trek: Enterprise; 2001
- Last appearance: "These Are the Voyages..."; Star Trek: Enterprise; 2005

Information
- Affiliation: Starfleet
- Launched: April 12, 2151
- Decommissioned: 2161
- Captain: Jonathan Archer (Scott Bakula)
- Auxiliary vehicles: 2 Shuttlepods; 2 Workpods

General characteristics
- Class: NX
- Registry: NX-01
- Armaments: Spatial torpedoes; Photonic torpedoes; Phase cannons; Plasma cannons
- Defenses: Polarized hull plating
- Maximum speed: Warp 5.06 (maximum speed); Warp 5.2 (emergency)

Enterprise (NX-01) is the fictional spaceship that serves as the primary setting of the American science fiction television series Star Trek: Enterprise. The ship predates the other Starfleet ships named Enterprise and was first seen in the pilot episode "Broken Bow". Its missions included an initial period of deep space exploration and a mission into the Delphic Expanse following the Xindi attack on Earth; it was also instrumental in the formation of the United Federation of Planets with the Vulcans, Andorians and Tellarites.

Its final regular appearance occurred in "These Are The Voyages...", where the ship is seen en route to the signing of the Federation charter and the decommissioning of the ship. Enterprise has appeared in several non-canon novels, which describe both its actions in the Romulan War and the vessel's final fate as a museum ship in orbit of Pluto. A model of an NX class ship was seen on screen in the 2013 film Star Trek Into Darkness. It has also appeared in the video game Star Trek: Encounters and Star Trek: Legacy, both released in 2006. When Star Trek: Enterprise released in 2001, there was at first a negative reaction to the design, but television critics were mostly positive, calling the design "a sort of retro-futurism". Several Enterprise toys and models have been released, including versions by Art Asylum, Diamond Select Toys, QMx and Eaglemoss Publications.

== Background ==
In the original pitch for Star Trek by creator Gene Roddenberry, the vessel that the series was set on was called the SS Yorktown, changed to USS Enterprise before the start of the series.

Following the end of Star Trek: Voyager, which had been used to launch UPN, they were seeking a new Star Trek series. The network contacted Rick Berman during the fifth season of Star Trek: Voyager, and informed him that if he didn't develop a new Star Trek show then they would find someone else who would. Berman had previously been an executive producer on Voyager, and other series dating back to The Next Generation. Berman contacted Brannon Braga, and the two became the executive producers on the new show. The new series launched after the end of Voyager, but was set a century before the events seen in The Original Series. The new series was originally called Enterprise, without the Star Trek prefix. UPN president Dean Valentine said that "Paramount felt it was no longer necessary. Enterprise is synonymous with Star Trek". Berman's idea was to set it in an earlier time period, with limited technology such as the ship only being able to travel up to warp 5, as he felt that after three series being set in roughly the same time period it would be exciting for the fans.

== Concept and design ==
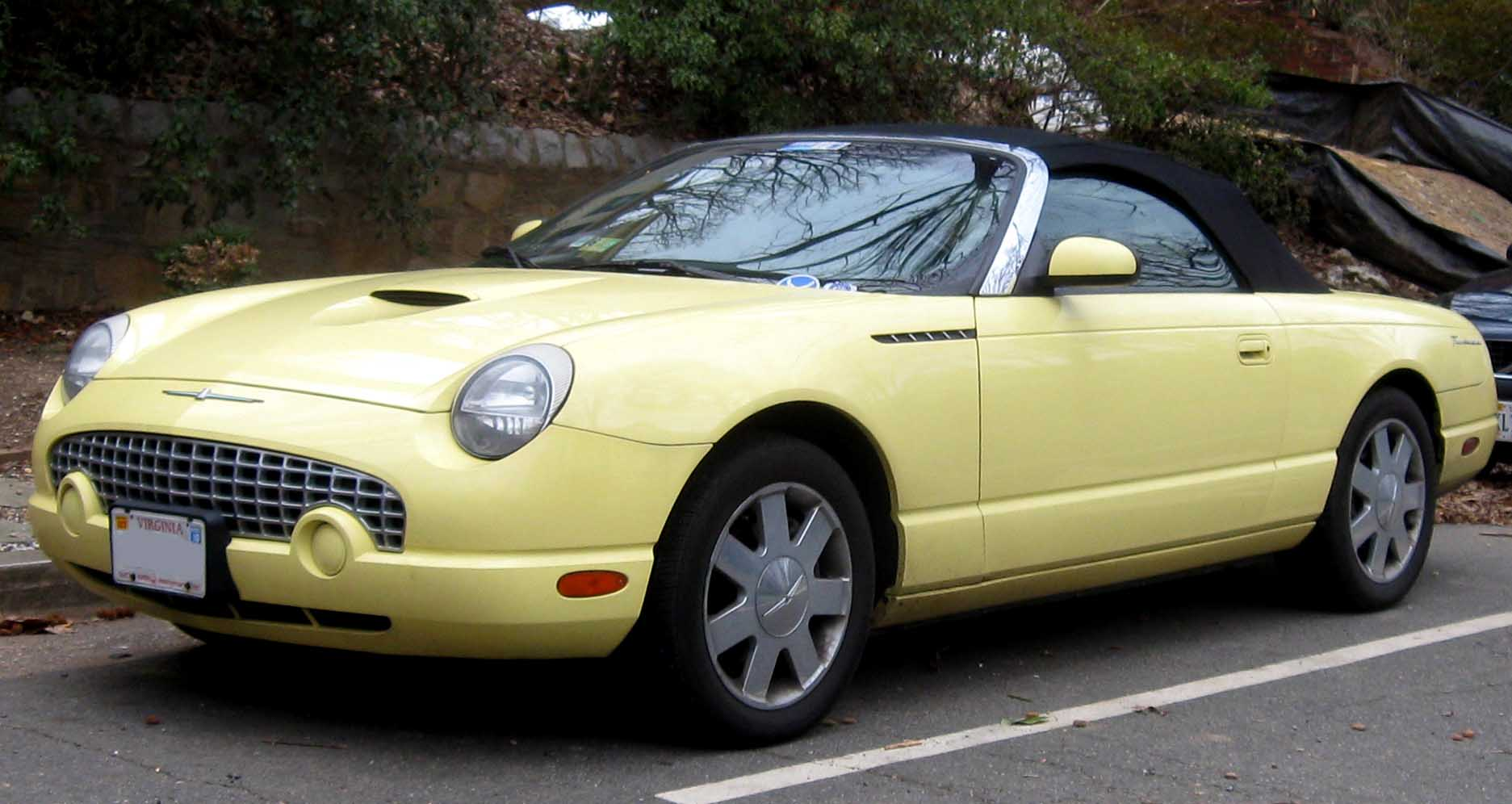
The throwback styling of the 2002 Ford Thunderbird inspired a similar concept (later abandoned) of having Enterprise (NX-01) as a throwback design, including secondary hull, of USS Enterprise (NCC-1701).

The first season was originally intended to be based around the construction of the ship. However, UPN wanted a more typical ship-based Star Trek series and so the ship was presented as almost finished in the pilot episode, "Broken Bow". Before the start of the series, the ship was referred to as the SS Enterprise.

An early design was for a version with a secondary hull, but it appeared to be too similar to the ship seen in The Original Series. That throwback styling had been partially inspired by Berman viewing the throwback concept in the 2002 Ford Thunderbird, itself a modern update of the original Thunderbird. Following that concept, the designers took the styling of the USS Enterprise from The Original Series and updated it, but ultimately it looked too much like a simple update to the same vessel.

The second design concept was similar to the Akira-class starship as seen on television in the Star Trek: Deep Space Nine and Voyager era, with the producers initially intending to use that class of vessel for Enterprise before Herman Zimmerman convinced them to go with a design with greater inspiration from The Original Series. The Akira itself had been created by Alex Jaeger for the 1996 film Star Trek: First Contact with influences from Battlestar Galactica, the Klingon Bird of Prey and the Miranda-class starship originally seen in Star Trek II: The Wrath of Khan. A similar design was created for Star Trek: The Academy Years, a film proposed by Harve Bennett in 1989. This featured the primary hull of Enterprise seen in The Original Series, but without a secondary hull.

=== Exterior design ===
Our first full view of the majestic ship as it clears the dock and moves into open space. More rocketship than starship, Enterprise is lean and masculine – yet its deflector dish and twin warp nacelles suggest the shape of Starfleet vessels to come.

— Excerpt from "Broken Bow" script, Rick Berman and Brannon Braga.

Enterprise NX-01 was designed by Doug Drexler, and based on the features of the Akira-class. The new class itself was designated as NX by the producers, but Drexler referred to it as the Enterprise-class due to the naval tradition of naming the class after the first vessel. Drexler had intended for the ship to be similar in design to the Daedalus-class starship with a sphere-shaped primary hull, but the producers wanted a flat saucer-shaped hull as it was more immediately recognizable as a Star Trek vessel. Drexler deliberately attempted to insert references to The Original Series into the ship. One of these was narrow struts leading from the body of the ship to the warp nacelles – however Dan Curry wanted them made bulkier as seen in ships of later series. Drexler included a leading edge at the front of the nacelles, and later described that the original struts would have been around a third more than those.

Drexler also wanted the bussard collectors at the front of the warp nacelles to be orange like The Original Series, but this was overruled by producers once more, who wanted them red also like the later series. Drexler thought that this was because Rick Berman wasn't fond of bright colors, and so Star Trek: Enterprise was filmed in greys and dark blues. The rear ends of the nacelles were influenced by Enterprise from The Original Series, with the spheres that appeared on the 1960s version split in two for the NX-01. Direct elements from The Original Series that did make it on to the NX-01 were the impulse engine cones and the lower sensor dome. The most prominent element from the first television Enterprise was the deflector dish. For the NX-01, it was vertically compressed placed at the front of the saucer. The process of Drexler getting his designs approved by the producers was later described as "a long hard battle" by production illustrator and creator of Enterprise-E, John Eaves.

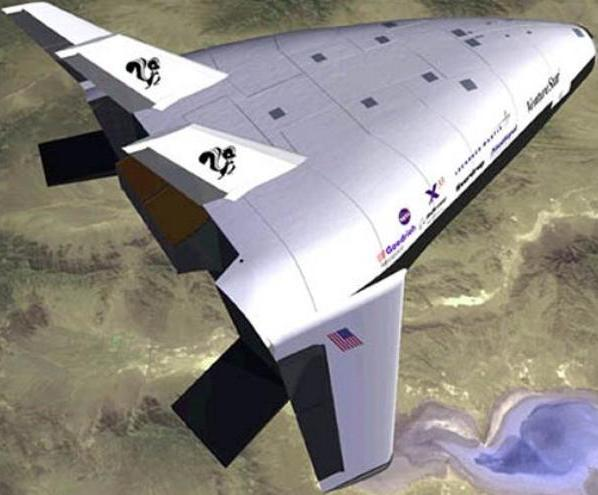
The Lockheed Martin X-33 inspired the design of the shuttlepods on board Enterprise.

The exterior model was created in CGI rather than as a physical model, with the production done by Pierre Drolet from Foundation Imaging using LightWave 3D. Two versions were created – a high definition version that was created for use in the television series itself and a lower resolution, which was also referred to as the "approved model". The low-res model was used for promotional purposes while work was conducted on the television model. The exterior of the ship made its debut in a centerfold spread in the July 14, 2001 edition of TV Guide using the approved model. This version looked smaller as the windows on the ship were larger than used on the television version, and the hull had a bronze tint. Regarding this change in coloration, Drexler later said that he didn't know when the change was made as both he and Zimmerman approved the prior version.

Following this initial usage, the approved model was only used as a stand-in for the production version in the previews in the fourth season. The drawing of the exterior of Enterprise in the captain's ready room was created by John Eaves in less than 24 hours alongside four other drawings of earlier incarnations of the name. The shuttlecraft on the show were directly inspired by the Lockheed Martin X-33, with Zimmerman saying that the re-entry vehicles used now will be the same technology used in the time of Enterprise because up until then they won't have had the technological push that comes from developing the advanced technology seen being introduced for the first time on the show. These were referred to as shuttlepods in the show; Enterprise was equipped with two of them.

==== Season 5 ====
Doug Drexler had intended for Enterprise to undergo a major refit if a fifth season had been produced, and the series had not been cancelled at the end of the fourth season. This would have seen the addition of a secondary hull, and resulted in the ship taking on an appearance closer to the Constitution-class vessels in The Original Series and later series. The redesign made its debut in the 2011 edition of the official Ships of the Line calendar. It was one of two designs for vessels never seen on screen to appear in that year's calendar, with Matt Jefferies' design for the USS Enterprise (XCV-330) also appearing.

This refit design of an NX-class starship made its television debut in the background of Star Trek: Picard's second season as a toy in young Jean-Luc Picard's house, and then again in third season as a decommissioned ship docked at the Starfleet Museum.

=== Interior design ===
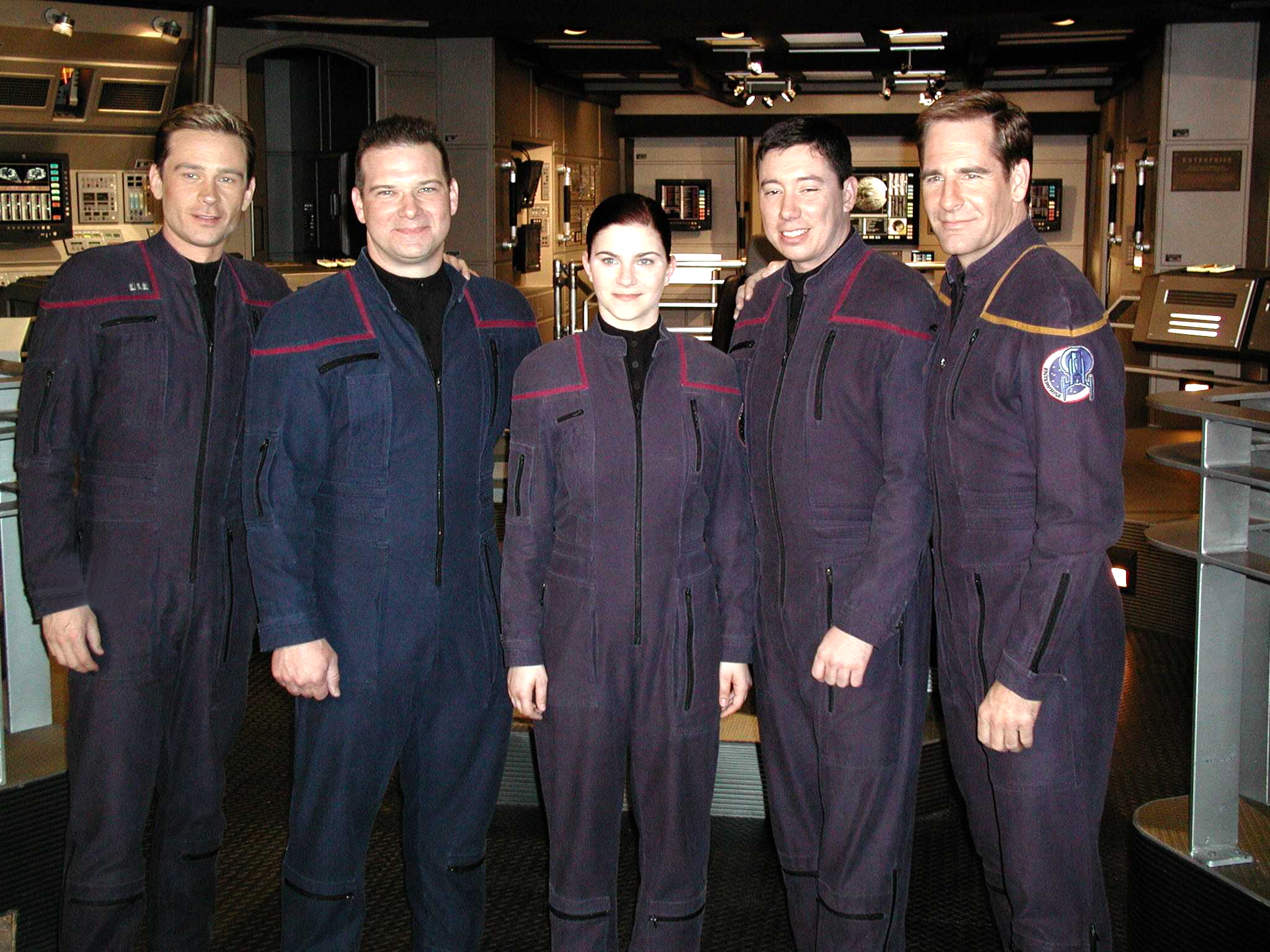
Scott Bakula and Connor Trinneer on the standing bridge set of Enterprise with three crew members from the aircraft carrier USS Enterprise (CVN-65).

The interior of the vessel was designed by Zimmerman, who visited United States Navy fast-attack submarines such as the USS Houston for inspiration. He also kept in mind the heritage of the other ships named Enterprise in the history of Star Trek. The designs attempted to allow a greater freedom of filming angles than seen in previous Star Trek series. The bridge stations were originally designed with both angular and tubular elements, but the tubular elements were dropped as they seemed out of place. John Eaves created the designs for the stations, while Mike and Denise Okuda, Jim Van Over and Anthony Fredrickson created the mechanical and detailed elements. Inspiration was taken from United States Navy ships and the Space Shuttle, such as the inclusion of operations manuals on some of the stations such as communications. Other elements that were added included a switch from the touch screen controls seen in series such as The Next Generation to more hands-on dials and buttons as appeared in The Original Series. The set also included what was described as "busy boxes" by the crew, which were parts of the consoles that folded out and were filled with wires - so that background actors could look busy during a shot when Enterprise was being refitted or when there was battle damage to be seen on screen.

Zimmerman and his team took feedback from the directors of previous Star Trek series to make the new space easier to film. Whereas in other series there have been purpose-built sets for briefing rooms, following the feedback this area was built into the bridge itself as the directors had stated that it proved difficult to make several people sitting around a table seem interesting. The transporter design was intended as a reference to the original series design that was created by Matt Jefferies, with Zimmerman including certain design elements such as the wall patterns around the transporter itself. The design of the engineering deck was overhauled from previous series with the intention for it to look like the engine room of a nuclear submarine. Zimmerman described it saying, "You're going to see a very powerful engine that looks like a very powerful engine."

== Appearances ==
=== Deep space exploration ===
The ship first appeared in the pilot of Star Trek: Enterprise, "Broken Bow". The episode showed the maiden voyage of Enterprise, with the crew of 84 returning a Klingon named Klang (Tom Lister, Jr.) to his homeworld, Qo'noS. Following that success, the ship and crew are ordered to begin a deep space exploration mission. At launch, the vessel was limited to a maximum speed of warp 5 and was equipped with an experimental transporter. The ship was launched three weeks ahead of schedule on April 16, 2151, and several of its weapon systems were not yet online but it was equipped with polarized hull plating as a defensive measure. It was not until the following month while in combat with an unknown foe that its spatial torpedoes were calibrated; and the phase cannons were installed in the following September.

The exploration mission was temporarily cancelled in the final episode of the first season, "Shockwave", following the destruction of an alien colony after a shuttlepod from Enterprise seemingly ignited the planet's atmosphere. The ship was recalled to Earth, but after an investigation showed that the Suliban were responsible, the mission resumed. In "Minefield", Enterprise suffered a hull breach from a Romulan mine, but the crew was informed of a nearby repair facility where the breach was repaired in "Dead Stop". Following the failure of a plasma injector in the warp drive, the ship had to make a detour to the Kreetassan homeworld in "A Night in Sickbay".

=== The Delphic Expanse ===
In the episode "The Expanse", the final episode of the second season, Enterprise was recalled once again to Earth following an attack by the Xindi resulting in the deaths of seven million people. At Captain Archer's urging the ship and crew undertook a new mission, to go into the Delphic Expanse and track down the Xindi to prevent the use of a greater weapon that would destroy Earth. Before departure, the ship was refitted with the new photonic torpedoes and a command center for data analysis. The crew was bolstered by a detachment of Military Assault Command Operations (MACO) soldiers. During the year-long mission in the expanse Enterprise was repeatedly damaged by the spatial anomalies in the area, which the crew discovered were caused by several alien-built moon-sized spheres. The ship suffers a further hull breach and other damage during the events of "Chosen Realm" when the ship and crew are caught up in the Triannon civil war.

While investigating a possible location of the superweapon in "Azati Prime", Enterprise was severely damaged by several Xindi vessels and its warp coil was destroyed. This necessitates the crew stealing a warp coil from an Illyrian vessel in the following episode "Damage" as without it the ship could not travel at warp and intercept the Xindi weapon. Following that acquisition, the ship and crew are approached by a version of Enterprise that had been sent 117 years into the past and has become a generational ship. The crew of the two versions of Enterprise work together and enable the present-day Enterprise to enter a subspace corridor to allow Captain Archer to meet with the Xindi Council. The whereabouts of the future Enterprise are unknown, but there is speculation as to whether it was destroyed or ceased to exist.

After locating the Xindi weapon in "The Council", the weapon was launched in "Countdown" in spite of an assault by Enterprise and her new Xindi allies. While Captain Archer leads a boarding party onto the weapon in the final episode of third season, "Zero Hour", Enterprise is commanded by T'Pol (Jolene Blalock) who directs it to a nearby sphere. She and Commander Tucker devise a way to modify the ship's deflector dish to use it as a weapon to destroy the sphere. Despite the interference of several Sphere Builders, the modifications destroy the sphere and set off a chain reaction destroying all the other spheres within the Expanse. Enterprise rendezvous with Archer's away team and it is revealed to the crew that Archer failed to make it off the superweapon before its destruction. The heavily damaged ship is returned to Earth inside a Xindi-Aquatic vessel. Upon arrival, the crew find that the events of the Temporal Cold War have overtaken them as the vessel is sent back in time to an alternative 20th century where Nazi Germany has successfully invaded the United States. After the crew defeat the alien Vosk (Jack Gwaltney) and recover Captain Archer, the ship is returned to its correct time by Temporal Agent Daniels (Matt Winston) in "Storm Front".

=== The Coalition of Planets and the Romulan War ===
Following the Xindi mission, Enterprise undergoes repairs and upgrades in "Home". In "Daedalus", Dr. Emory Erickson (Bill Cobbs), the inventor of the device, performed an upgrade on the transporter. Further upgrades occurred to the plasma injector in the warp drive, allowing Enterprise to reach a cruising speed of warp 5.02 and an emergency speed of warp 5.2. While carrying a Tellarite Ambassador to a conference on Babel One, the ship is diverted due to attacks on several nearby vessels. It is discovered to be a Romulan vessel that uses holograms to change its external appearance. The attacks are revealed in "The Aenar" as being an attempt by the Romulans to provoke a war between the Andorians and the Tellarites. Instead Enterprise is used as the location for peace talks and takes charge of a fleet of vessels used to create a sensor grid to track down the Romulan ship. This temporary alliance between the humans, Vulcans, Andorians and Tellarites lays the groundwork for the eventual Coalition of Planets.

Enterprise returns to Earth once more and Commander Tucker transfers to her new Sister Ship Columbia in "Affliction". He is later reinstated as Chief Engineer to Enterprise in the following episode, "Divergence". In that episode the two vessels undertake a pair of dangerous high warp manuevers- a zip line transfer to get Tucker over to repair Enterprise's warp drive following sabotage by the Klingons, followed by Columbia holding Enterprise at Maximum Warp with her own engines while Tucker removes the sabotage.

A Mirror Universe version of Enterprise is seen in the first part of "In a Mirror, Darkly" under the command of Captain Maximilian Forest (Vaughn Armstrong). The ship is destroyed in combat with Tholians shortly after a mutiny by Commander Archer.

In "Demons" and "Terra Prime", Enterprise travels back to Earth to resolve a crisis with a terrorist cell called Terra Prime, which seeks to remove all alien influence from Earth.

The Romulan war was not seen on screen, but instead has been described in the non-canon novel The Romulan War: Beneath the Raptor's Wing by Michael A. Martin, and subsequent follow-up books. The events of the episode "These Are the Voyages..." on board Enterprise are set six years after those seen in "Terra Prime" in 2161, but are actually related in the holodeck on board Enterprise-D during the events of the Star Trek: The Next Generation episode "The Pegasus". Following the Romulan war, Enterprise is diverted en route to Earth where is it due to be present for the signing of the Federation charter. The non-canon Shatnerverse novel Captain's Glory states that following its decommissioning, Enterprise was placed into the orbit of Pluto as a museum piece.

=== Other appearances ===
Enterprise appeared in the video games Star Trek: Encounters and Star Trek: Legacy, both released in 2006. It is the first vessel that the player controls in each storyline, before moving onto the USS Enterprise seen in The Original Series and later depictions. Enterprise was seen as a model in a collection depicting the history of flight in Fleet Admiral Alexander Marcus' (Peter Weller) office in Star Trek Into Darkness (2013). It was placed next to other historical vessels such as the Wright Flyer, the Space Shuttle and the NX-Alpha.

== Reception and commentary ==
There was a negative fan reaction to the design of Enterprise, and criticism of the efforts of Drexler and the other designers. When questioned about this, Geoffrey Mandel stated in an interview, "Having been around then, I also know that Doug Drexler and John Eaves did EXACTLY what the producers asked them to: Rick and Braga had very strong opinions, and knew exactly what they wanted."

Allan Johnson, while writing for the Chicago Tribune, said that Enterprise looked "sleeker and less cheesy than the original 'Trek'." Johnson added that although it contained technology that wasn't as advanced as that seen in the earlier Star Trek series set in the 24th century, it "still maintains a techno-savvy, post-1960s 'Trek' flair." David Kronke in the Los Angeles Daily News, said that the sets were "largely gun-metal gray, representing a sort of retro-futurism – sort of what might've happened if '50s sci-fi design cliches had had today's technology to work with" and that the consoles had a "simpler mechanical feel". In his review of "Broken Bow" for The Washington Post, David Segal described Enterprise's speed of warp 4 as slower than a Hyundai.

In 2018, Io9/Gizmodo ranked the NX-01 fictional spacecraft design shown in this episode, as the 7th best version of starship Enterprise of the Star Trek franchise. They felt that it both felt familiar as an Enterprise design, but also had its own look.

In 2019, SyFy ranked the fictional starship design, the NX-01 Enterprise as the 8th best version of the starship in the Star Trek science fiction universe.

=== Models and toy lines ===
The initial 7-inch (18 cm) figure range by Art Asylum each shipped with an Enterprise bridge console. They slotted together to form a bridge diorama. The actual Enterprise was also released by Art Asylum, and debuted at the 2002 New York Toy Fair. Following the acquisition of Art Asylum by Diamond Select Toys in 2007, the company continued to release Enterprise toys. These included both the main television version and a Mirror Universe configuration as seen in "In A Mirror, Darkly".

Enterprise has also been released as part of model lines. These include a 350:1 scale replica of the CGI model by QMx. It features more than 150 LEDs, sound effects and a signed plaque by Doug Drexler. Each QMx model takes 150 hours to make and was limited to a production run of 1,000 units. QMx also produced the models seen in Star Trek Into Darkness, including the one of Enterprise. Enterprise has also been released as a model kit by Round 2 Models as part of their Polar Lights line. These include both the version seen in the television series, and the refit design intended for season five.

== Bibliography ==
- Carey, Diane; Ruditis, Paul (2001). Enterprise: Broken Bow. New York: Pocket Books. ISBN 0-7434-4862-6.
- Nemecek, Larry (2003). Star Trek: The Next Generation Companion (3rd ed.). New York: Pocket Books. ISBN 0-7434-5798-6.
- Reeves-Stevens, Judith; Reeves-Stevens, Garfield (1995). The Art of Star Trek. New York: Pocket Books. ISBN 0-671-89804-3.
- Shatner, William; Reeves-Stevens, Judith; Reeves-Stevens, Garfield (2007). Captain's Glory. New York: Pocket Books. ISBN 978-0-7434-5376-9.
- Stillwell, Eric (2007). The Making of Yesterday's Enterprise. Raleigh, North Carolina: Lulu. ISBN 978-1-4357-0256-1.
