= Divergence (Star Trek: Enterprise) =

- Star Trek: Enterprise episode
- Episode no.: Season 4 Episode 16
- Directed by: David Barrett
- Written by: Judith Reeves-Stevens; Garfield Reeves-Stevens
- Production code: 092
- Original air date: February 25, 2005

Guest appearances
- Kristin Bauer – Lieutenant Laneth; James Avery – General K'Vagh; John Schuck – Antaak; Terrell Tilford – Marab; Eric Pierpoint – Harris; Ada Maris – Captain Erika Hernandez; Wayne Grace – Fleet Admiral Krell

Episode chronology
← Previous "Affliction"	Next → "Bound"
- Star Trek: Enterprise season 4

"Divergence" is the sixteenth episode of the fourth season of the American science fiction television series Star Trek: Enterprise. It originally aired on February 25, 2005 in the United States on UPN. It was the fourth episode of Enterprise to be written by Judith and Garfield Reeves-Stevens, and was the first episode of a Star Trek series directed by David Barrett. "Divergence" is the second part of a two part story, following on from "Affliction".

Set in the 22nd century, the series follows the adventures of the first Starfleet starship Enterprise, registration NX-01. In this episode, Columbia arrives so that Commander Tucker can be transferred to conduct repairs on Enterprise's warp engine before it overloads. The two ships then pursue a lead to a Klingon research outpost where Phlox is under pressure to cure the virus that the Klingons created from augmented human DNA.

Filming took eight days, with a two-week seasonal hiatus towards the end of December. In addition to the guest stars who appeared in "Affliction", they were joined by Wayne Grace as Admiral Krell. The episode received Nielsen ratings of 1.7/3 percent, which were lower than the previous week's episode. The critical response was mixed, the concept was praised but there was criticism over the plot holes and characterisation. The two part story has been named as one of the best storylines seen in Enterprise.

== Plot ==
With the ship unable to decrease speed below warp 5, and the warp core reaching dangerous pressure levels, Columbia and Commander Tucker rendezvous to provide assistance. However the crew know that the transporter cannot be used at warp, so the ships will need to maneuver in close proximity in order for Tucker to be transferred. Captain Archer releases Lieutenant Reed from the brig to perform the transfer. Once on Enterprise, Tucker successfully performs a rapid non-standard cold boot on the warp engine, which purges the Klingon subroutines. Tucker then agrees to remain onboard temporarily to assist with repairs.

Meanwhile, physician Antaak and a badly beaten Doctor Phlox update General K'Vagh on their progress. K'Vagh contacts Admiral Krell, who tells him that if a cure is not completed soon, the facility will be eradicated in order to contain the disease. Back on Enterprise, Archer questions Reed about his recent actions, and is contacted by Harris from Section 31, a secretive agency within Starfleet. Harris reveals that Phlox is on an important mission and little else, but Reed reveals his location as Qu'Vat; Harris contacts Krell, to inform him that Enterprise is on the way, and Krell reveals that he used Harris. Enterprise arrives at the colony, and Archer beams down to the base with Marab to confront the Klingons and Phlox.

Krell's Klingon battlecruiser and two Birds of Prey arrive in orbit and Krell orders the ships to destroy the colony. Enterprise attempts to intervene but is engaged by the Birds of Prey. Columbia arrives and joins combat with the two Birds of Prey, while Enterprise impedes the battlecruiser. Meanwhile, Phlox infects a voluntarily restrained Archer, as he needs human antibodies for the cure. Antaak then transports a canister of the virus onto the battlecruiser which infects the crew, including Krell. Needing the cure from Phlox, Krell stands down the attack and the Klingon High Council soon agrees to distribute the cure throughout the Empire.

Harris contacts Reed, thanking him and confirming that the plan proceeded as per Section 31's projections, stabilizing the leadership of the Klingon Empire while scaring it off from augment experimentation. Reed makes it clear that his loyalty lies with Archer and Enterprise rather than Harris and Section 31.

== Production ==
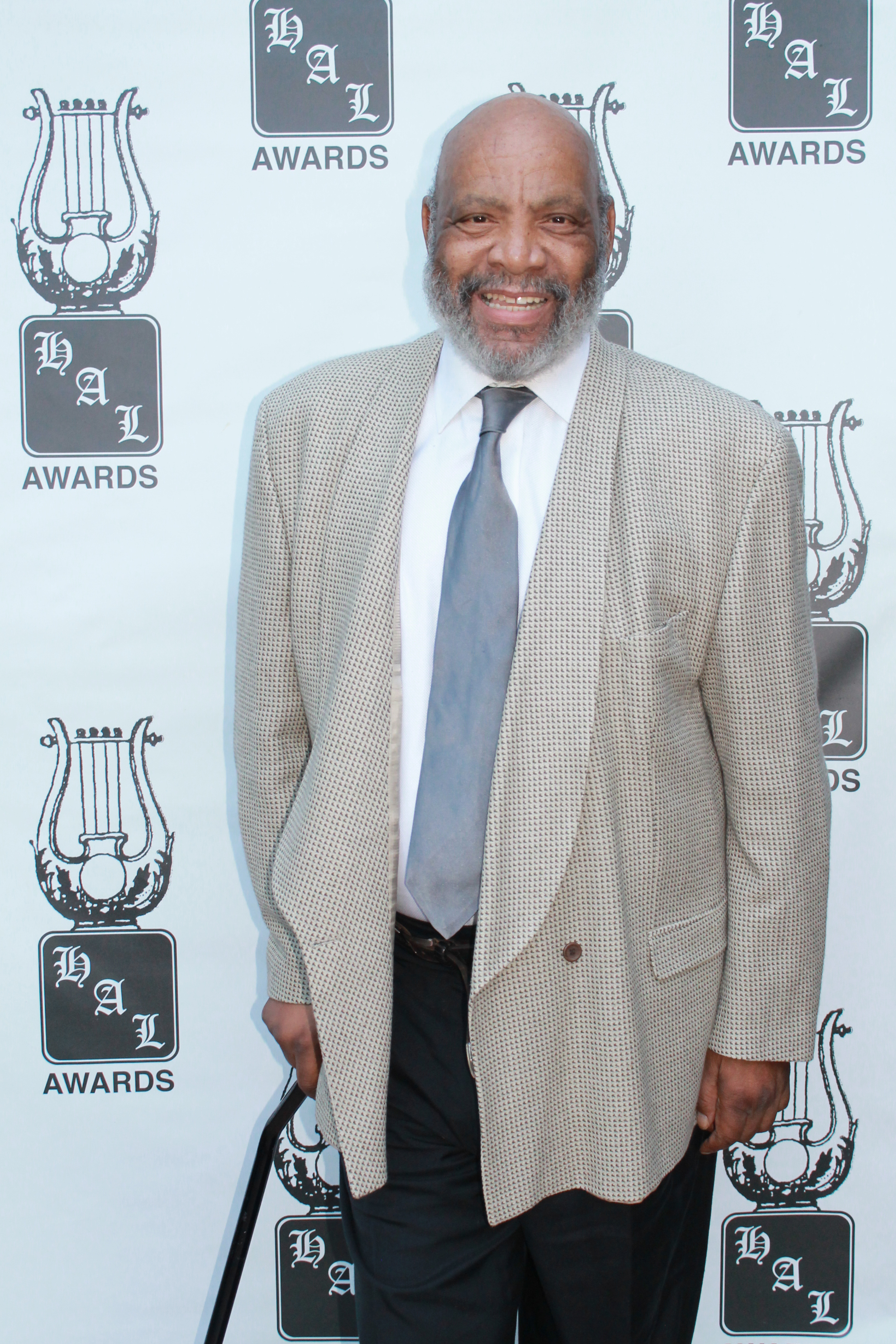
James Avery portrayed the role as K'Vagh, in both this and the previous episode "Affliction".

Filming began on December 14, 2004 and ran for four days before the cast and crew went on a two-week break over the holiday period. The production overlapped on December 16, with second-unit filming on the episode "United", which required most of the main cast with the exception of Billingsley as Phlox. The opportunity was taken to film the majority of the sequences with Phlox, K'Vagh and Antaak at the same time on a different sound stage so as to not delay the production. After the break, production resumed on January 3, 2005. Minimal shooting was conducted on the first day for "Divergence", as further second-unit filming took place in the afternoon for "United" and for "Babel One". On the second day, Eric Pierpoint and Wayne Grace filmed their scenes as they both appeared on only one set each. Whilst filming was scheduled for seven days, the second-unit filming for "Divergence" pushed into an eighth day on January 6, which overlapped with the production of "Bound".

Judith and Garfield Reeves-Stevens joined the staff as writers during season four. Prior to "Divergence" they had already written the episodes "The Forge", "Observer Effect" and "United". The Reeves-Stevens said of "Divergence", "we've written a multiple-starship action sequence that's never been seen before, and that everyone's very excited to bring to the screen." "Divergence" was the first Star Trek credit for director David Barrett. Several guest cast members resume their roles from "Affliction", including James Avery as K'Vagh, John Schuck as Antaak, Terrell Tilford as Marab and Eric Pierpoint as Harris. They were joined in "Divergence" by Wayne Grace as Krell. Grace had previously appeared across the franchise including in a voice role in the computer game Star Trek: Klingon Academy, a Cardassian in the Star Trek: Deep Space Nine episode "Wrongs Darker Than Death or Night" and as the Klingon Governor Torak in Star Trek: The Next Generation's "Aquiel". Kristin Bauer as Lieutenant Laneth later became better known in her appearances as Pam in HBO's True Blood.

== Reception ==
"Divergence" originally aired on UPN, on February 25, 2005. According to Nielsen Media Research, the episode received a 1.7/3 percent share. This means that it was seen by 1.7 percent of the population, and three percent of all viewers watching television at the time of the broadcast. This was less than the ratings received by the previous episode, "Affliction", which scored ratings of 1.8/3 percent. It finished behind programs on NBC, ABC, CBS and Fox as well as What I Like About You and a repeat of Reba during the second half-hour on The WB.

IGN gave the episode four out of five, and wrote: "Enterprise continues its transformation into a watchable, entertaining television series and, more importantly, a good Star Trek series."

Jason Davis of Cinescape gave the episode a grade B+, and praised the writers for taking the limitations of the original series and using it as the starting point for a solid story. He said the episode "Divergence" does double duty as a drama-filled adventure story boasting scenes of tension and quality moral conflicts while simultaneously adding to the overall canvas of Trek-lore with continuity that will satisfy long-standing followers of the franchise without getting in the way of occasional viewers."

Michelle Erica Green, in her review for TrekNation, said that it wasn't as good as the previous episode, and thought that there were plot holes. She felt that some of the episode featured bad science, such as when Tucker was transferred between the two ships. She also criticized Archer going down to the Klingon base on his own, calling him a "putz" and said of the Klingon attack, "since when do Klingons destroy ships with deadly subroutines rather than, you know, BOMBS?" She thought the characterization was forced, and wanted a better resolution to the events in "Affliction" which she had called "one of the greatest hours of Star Trek ever".

Jamahl Epsicokhan on his website Jammer's Reviews, gave the episode a score of two out of four, saying that the battle scenes were "painfully routine" and that where the episode "runs off the rails is in these final 10 minutes". He felt that it was a pattern of the final episodes in story arcs not having a "satisfying finish" and that "Divergence" followed in this pattern set by "The Augments" and "The Aenar".

The two part story in "Affliction" and "Divergence" were ranked the fifth best story of Enterprise by Den of Geek writer James Hunt. Keith DeCandido of Tor.com gave it 6 out of 10 in his 2023 rewatch.

In a SyFy interview, some of the cast recommended this episode as a favorite.

== Home media release ==
The first home media release of the episode was on DVD as part of the season four box set. This was released in the UK on October 31, 2005, and on November 1, 2005 in the United States. The Blu-ray edition was released on April 1, 2014.
