= United (Star Trek: Enterprise) =

- Star Trek: Enterprise episode
- Archer and Shran duel, each using an Ushaan-Tor.
- Episode no.: Season 4 Episode 13
- Directed by: David Livingston
- Story by: Manny Coto
- Teleplay by: Judith Reeves-Stevens; Garfield Reeves-Stevens
- Production code: 413
- Original air date: February 4, 2005

Guest appearances
- Jeffrey Combs – Commander Shran; Lee Arenberg – Ambassador Gral; Brian Thompson – Admiral Valdore; Geno Silva – Senator Vrax; Kevin Brief – Naarg; Molly Brink – Lieutenant Talas; J. Michael Flynn – Nijil; Scott Allen Rinker – Pilot

Episode chronology
← Previous "Babel One"	Next → "The Aenar"
- Star Trek: Enterprise season 4

"United" is the 13th episode of the fourth season of the American science fiction television series Star Trek: Enterprise and the 89th episode overall. It was first broadcast on UPN on February 4, 2005. It is the second of a three-part story which included the previous episode "Babel One", and the following episode, "The Aenar". "United" was written by Judith and Garfield Reeves-Stevens from a story idea by show runner Manny Coto. It was directed by David Livingston, his third of the season.

Set in the 22nd century, the series follows the adventures of the first Starfleet starship Enterprise, registration NX-01. In this episode, two of the crew are trapped on the Romulan drone ship while Captain Jonathan Archer (Scott Bakula) on the Enterprise attempts to gain the co-operation of the Andorians and Tellarites in tracking down the drone. His plan is complicated when Commander Shran (Jeffrey Combs) challenges a Tellarite to a duel, causing Archer to step in. After he defeats Shran, the races work together and force the retreat of the Romulan vessel and the missing crewman are recovered.

The episode was filmed over seven days, reusing the standing sets and those created for the previous episode. The duel was choreographed by Vince Deadrick Jr., and the Ushaan-Tor weapon itself was created by Dan Curry. "United" was watched by 2.81 million viewers on the first broadcast. Critics responded favourably to the episode, comparing it to the Star Trek: The Original Series episode "Amok Time" and the Andorians' actions to those of Klingons elsewhere in the franchise. The episode was Emmy Award nominated for makeup.

== Plot ==
"United" continues from the events in "Babel One". On Romulus, Admiral Valdore (Brian Thompson), Romulan scientist Nijil (J. Michael Flynn), and their pilot continue to control the mysterious "marauder", cloaking it to look like Enterprise and then using it to destroy a Rigelian vessel. Despite this success, Senator Vrax (Geno Silva) chastises them for losing full control of their drone since Commander Charles "Trip" Tucker III (Connor Trinneer) and Lieutenant Malcolm Reed (Dominic Keating) are still on board. Valdore and Nijil then work to trap Tucker inside a service junction as he attempts to divert power. After incapacitating him with leaked radioactive coolant, Valdore then orders Reed to re-establish the damaged warp matrix on the drone or see his crewmate die. Reed complies in order to rescue Tucker.

Meanwhile, aboard Enterprise, Commander T'Pol (Jolene Blalock) and Ensign Travis Mayweather (Anthony Montgomery) devise a surveillance grid that will require the coordinated effort of 128 spaceships. After seeking help from Earth and Vulcan, Captain Jonathan Archer (Scott Bakula) realizes that he will need to obtain Andorian and Tellarite support too. Archer's attempt hits a snag when Lieutenant Talas dies from the phaser wound sustained earlier. A devastated Commander Shran (Jeffrey Combs) openly challenges Naarg (Kevin Brief) to a blood-duel using Ushaan-Tor, an Andorian ice-miner's tool. Realizing that a death will derail trade negotiations, Archer announces himself as the Tellarite's substitute. The duel proceeds and Archer is fortunately able to win, and spares Shran's life after severing an antenna.

With the duel completed, Shran promises continued Andorian support for the grid, and the Tellarite's Ambassador Gral (Lee Arenberg) does the same. Enterprise, as a flagship, soon relocates and re-engages the drone. Reed and Tucker, caught in the crossfire and unable to be transported out, narrowly escape death by ejecting themselves into open space. A mixed fleet of "allied" vessels then arrive, forcing Vrax and Valdore to recall the drone at warp speed to Romulan space. Archer then invites the Andorians and the Tellarites to begin their negotiations early. On Romulus, the drone's pilot is revealed to be an Aenar, another species of the Andorian race.

== Production ==
"United" forms the second of a three part story, beginning with "Babel One" and concluding in "The Aenar". It was written by Judith and Garfield Reeves-Stevens, who were newly hired writers for the fourth season of Enterprise. It was their third script after "The Forge" and "Observer Effect". Manny Coto, the showrunner for the series, devised the story for "United". David Livingston directed the episode, his third of the season after "Borderland" and "Kir'Shara". Livingston said he went into the fourth season with the assumption that the show was not going to get a fifth season. After completing second unit shooting to fill out the episode, he walked out of the stage thinking: "It's over. It’s been a great run, but that's the last Star Trek shot I'm going to do."

Filming for the episode took seven days between November 11 and November 19, 2004, with half the shoot taking place on the standing ship sets representing the Enterprise itself, and the remainder on the Romulan drone and command center sets which had been created for "Babel One". For "United", the entire guest cast returned from the previous episode, as well as Geno Silva who played the Romulan senator Vrax and Scott Rinker as the albino Andorian revealed at the end of the episode. Neither actor had previously appeared in the franchise. The Reman race made their debut in the episode, as they had only previously appeared in the film Star Trek: Nemesis. The prosthetics seen in "United" were reused from that film.

Stunt co-ordinator Vince Deadrick Jr. choreographed the Ushaan fight scene between Shran and Archer, with stuntmen Gary Wayton and Kim Koscki doubling for Combs and Bakula in wide shots. The Ushaan-Tor itself was created by Dan Curry, whose previous work had included a variety of Klingon weapons including the bat'leth. The script had simply called for "a dangerous-looking Andorian weapon", with the design fully coming from Curry. To demonstrate the different physiology of the Andorians, the make-up department created a quantity of blue blood for use in that scene. It was also seen in an intravenous therapy prop in sickbay and for an earlier scene where Shran pours a quantity of it onto a Tellarite to issue his challenge.

== Reception ==
"United" was first broadcast in the United States on February 4, 2005 on UPN. It was watched by 2.81 million viewers, which was more than the 2.53 million who saw the previous episode, but less than the 3.17 million who watched "The Aenar".

Jamahl Epsicokhan, at his website Jammer's Reviews, gave the episode three out of four stars. He compared the fight scene to the one from the Star Trek: The Original Series episode "Amok Time", and felt that it showed the Andorians as being similar to the Klingons seen elsewhere in the franchise. He felt that the main storyline wrapped up in "United", despite the twist at the end.

Michelle Erica Green of TrekNation, also compared "United" to "Amok Time", placing Archer in the same role as Captain James T. Kirk in that episode. She said that this made sense for the sake of entertainment, but questioned why one of the marines on board the ship couldn't have fought Shran instead. Green felt that the Andorians finally showed a series of similarities to the Klingons and pondered why they hadn't become allies due to their similarities. She liked the episode, and posed one last question: "Where were these sort of episodes when Enterprise still had a chance?"

Alasdair Wilkins of The A.V. Club described "United" as containing the most pivotal moment in the series, specifically the moment where the founding races of the Federation worked together to defeat the Romulan plot. He also praised the work of Combs as Shran, adding that the duel between Shran and Archer was "the kind of larger-than-life presence the often staid Enterprise most benefits from". Den of Geek recommended this episode to understand the importance of the Jonathan Archer character to the show.

This episode received an Emmy Award nomination in the category "Best Prosthetic Makeup for a Series".

== Home media release ==
"United" was released on home media in the United States on November 1, 2005, as part of the season four DVD box set of Enterprise. The Blu-ray edition was released on April 1, 2014.
