= Affliction (Star Trek: Enterprise) =

- Star Trek: Enterprise episode
- Episode no.: Season 4 Episode 15
- Directed by: Michael Grossman
- Story by: Manny Coto
- Teleplay by: Mike Sussman
- Production code: 415
- Original air date: February 18, 2005

Guest appearances
- John Schuck as Antaak; James Avery as General K'Vagh; Ada Maris as Captain Erika Hernandez; Eric Pierpoint as Harris; Terrell Tilford as Marab; Kate McNeil as Commander Collins; Derek Magyar as Commander Kelby; Seth MacFarlane as Ensign Rivers

Episode chronology
← Previous "The Aenar"	Next → "Divergence"
- Star Trek: Enterprise season 4

"Affliction" is the fifteenth episode of the fourth season of the American science fiction television series Star Trek: Enterprise, and originally aired on UPN on February 18, 2005. The script was written by Mike Sussman from a story by executive producer Manny Coto. It was the second episode of Enterprise to be directed by Michael Grossman. The episode is the first of a two-part story, which concludes with "Divergence".

Set in the 22nd century, the series follows the adventures of the first Starfleet starship Enterprise, registration NX-01. In "Affliction", the crew investigate the kidnapping of Doctor Phlox (John Billingsley), and the ship is attacked by a new type of Klingon. Meanwhile, Phlox is taken to a Klingon colony to work on a cure for a plague whose effects include the disappearance of the Klingon's cranial ridges.

The episode sought to answer the question of why Klingons looked different in Star Trek: The Original Series than in other series of the franchise. It also introduced Section 31, originally seen in Star Trek: Deep Space Nine, to an earlier time in the Star Trek canon.

The episode featured a number of guest stars who had previous connections to the franchise, including James Avery who was in the running for the part of Worf in The Next Generation, John Schuck who played a Klingon Ambassador in two Star Trek films, and Eric Pierpoint who had appeared in several other episodes of Star Trek previously. Some of the standing sets were redressed to appear as the interior of the Columbia, and some scenes were filmed outside at the Paramount Studios lot in Los Angeles, California.

== Plot ==
Enterprise returns to Earth in time for the launch of the second NX class starship, Columbia, and Commander Tucker prepares for his transfer. Meanwhile, Ensign Sato and Doctor Phlox are attacked in San Francisco, and Phlox is kidnapped. Captain Archer and Lieutenant Reed investigate the scene, and Reed is given a secret assignment by a secretive agent that he seems to know. Commander T'Pol, seeking information from Sato, conducts her first mind-meld, and the two realize that the attackers spoke Rigelian. They discover that a Rigelian freighter recently left orbit and head off in pursuit.

On Columbia, Tucker ruffles a few feathers of his new team, and Captain Hernandez asks the reasons behind his transfer. Later, T'Pol, in her quarters, begins to meditate and mentally goes to her white cloud quiet place only to have a slightly confused, but still amused, Tucker shows up there and start arguing with her. The moment of the shared vision (despite being on different ships) is broken when a disoriented Tucker appears to come out of a momentary daydream on Columbia. Enterprise locates a destroyed Rigelian ship, and while investigating, they are suddenly attacked and boarded. MACOs repel the attack and a captured alien is taken to Sickbay, where scanners show that despite his human appearance, he is in fact Klingon. Archer then discovers Reed's complicity in evidence tampering and confines him to the brig. Archer also learns that the boarders sabotaged the ship, and he orders maximum speed in order to prevent the warp core from overloading. The ship increases speed to warp 5.2, the fastest it has ever been.

Phlox is taken to Qu'Vat, a Klingon colony where General K'Vagh and Doctor Antaak seek his help to cure a Klingon plague. To Phlox's horror, K'Vagh kills an infected Klingon so that an autopsy can be performed. Phlox determines that the victim's DNA has been supplemented with that of a genetically augmented human. Phlox also learns from Antaak that they experimented with augmented DNA after the events seen in "Borderland", but it self-mutated and escaped. Antaak and Phlox are told that they have five days to cure the outbreak before it is too late. Antaak suggests that the only course of action is to create stable augmented Klingons, but Phlox refuses to assist further.

== Production ==
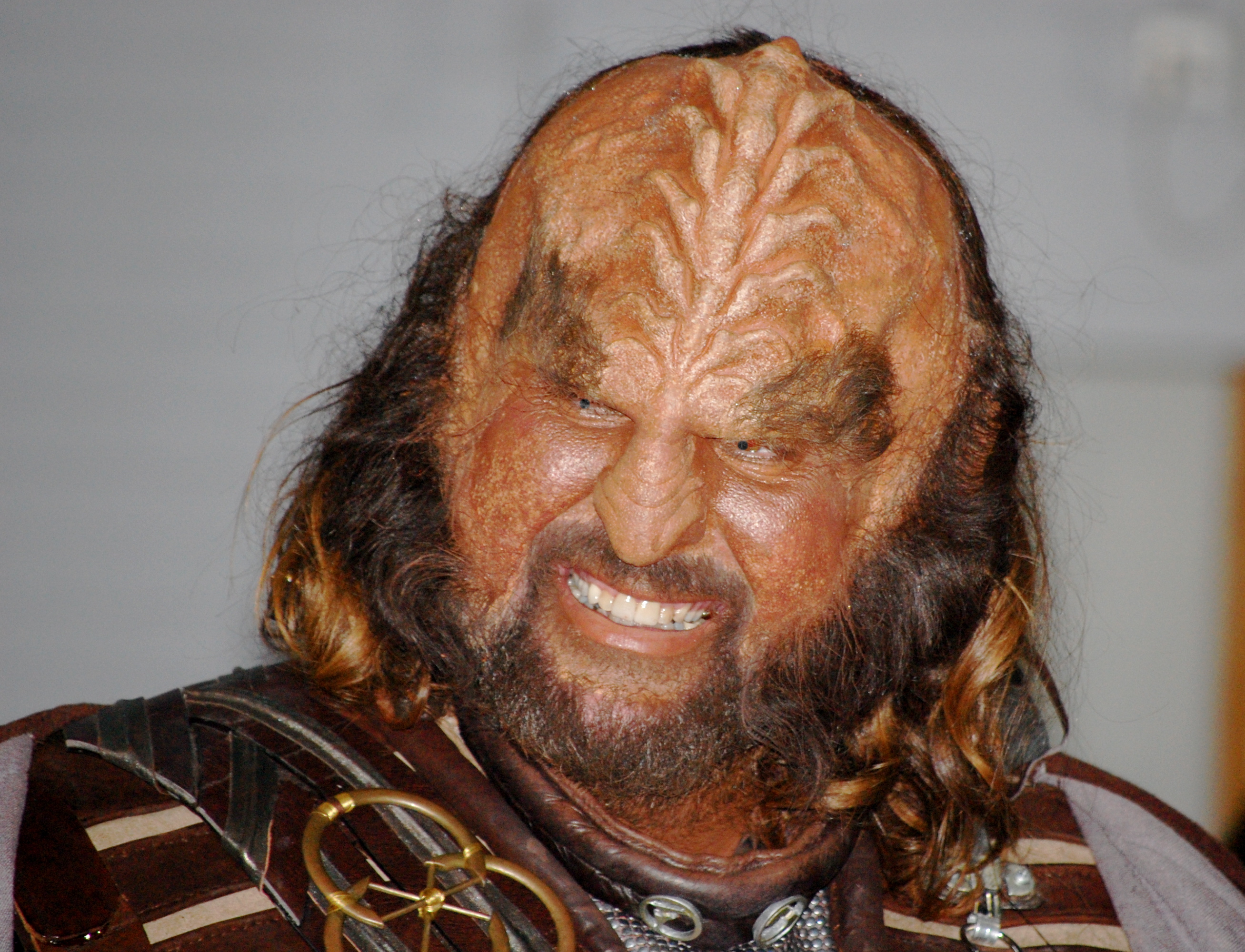
Up until "Affliction", Klingons (cosplayer pictured) in Enterprise had appeared with cranial ridges, initially seen in Star Trek: The Motion Picture

The storyline in "Affliction" answers an ongoing question which had begun with the pilot episode of Enterprise, "Broken Bow". In The Original Series, Klingons appeared mostly human, with no applied prosthetics. However, in Star Trek: The Motion Picture, they first appeared with forehead ridges and continued to appear this way through the remaining movies as well as The Next Generation, Deep Space Nine and Voyager. The DS9 episode "Trials and Tribble-ations" references the change, with Chief O'Brien suggesting that Klingons had been genetically modified and Doctor Bashir assuming a viral mutation had taken place.

Theories created by fans included the idea that the ridgeless Klingons were from a specific part of the home world, but this was discounted when three ridgeless Klingons from The Original Series appeared with ridges in the Deep Space Nine episode "Blood Oath". The Original Series had a restricted budget, and there was no funding for any prosthetic make-up for the Klingons until The Motion Picture. During The Original Series, it was decided to use them more frequently than the Romulans, whose prosthetics were more expensive. The original ridgeless design was created after suggestions by John Colicos, who based them on Genghis Khan and the people of the 13th and 14th century Mongol Empire. When "Broken Bow" aired, it featured Klingons with forehead ridges, despite the series being set prior to The Original Series. On the episode's script, the old style Klingons were referred to as "type-two" and "semi-Klingons".

The storyline was one of several in the fourth season of Enterprise which show runner Manny Coto sought to connect the series to The Original Series. Coto also revealed in an interview with the Chicago Tribune that the episode would see the start of Section 31. The episode also featured the first appearance on-screen of the Rigelians, despite first being mentioned in The Original Series and again in DS9. "Affliction" marks the fifth writing credit of the fourth season for Michael Sussman, while director Michael Grossman had previously directed the episode "Hatchery".

Filming took place from December 3, 2004, through to December 12. Several of the standing sets were redressed to appear as the locations on the USS Columbia, including the bridge, Captain's mess and the engineering section. The exterior scenes where Phlox and Hoshi were attacked were filmed on the Paramount lot in Los Angeles. As the New York streets backlot had already been used earlier in the season for the opening episode "Storm Front", this sequence was instead filmed in the area between the studio's Administration building and a building which had previously doubled for the high school in the sitcom Happy Days.

=== Casting ===
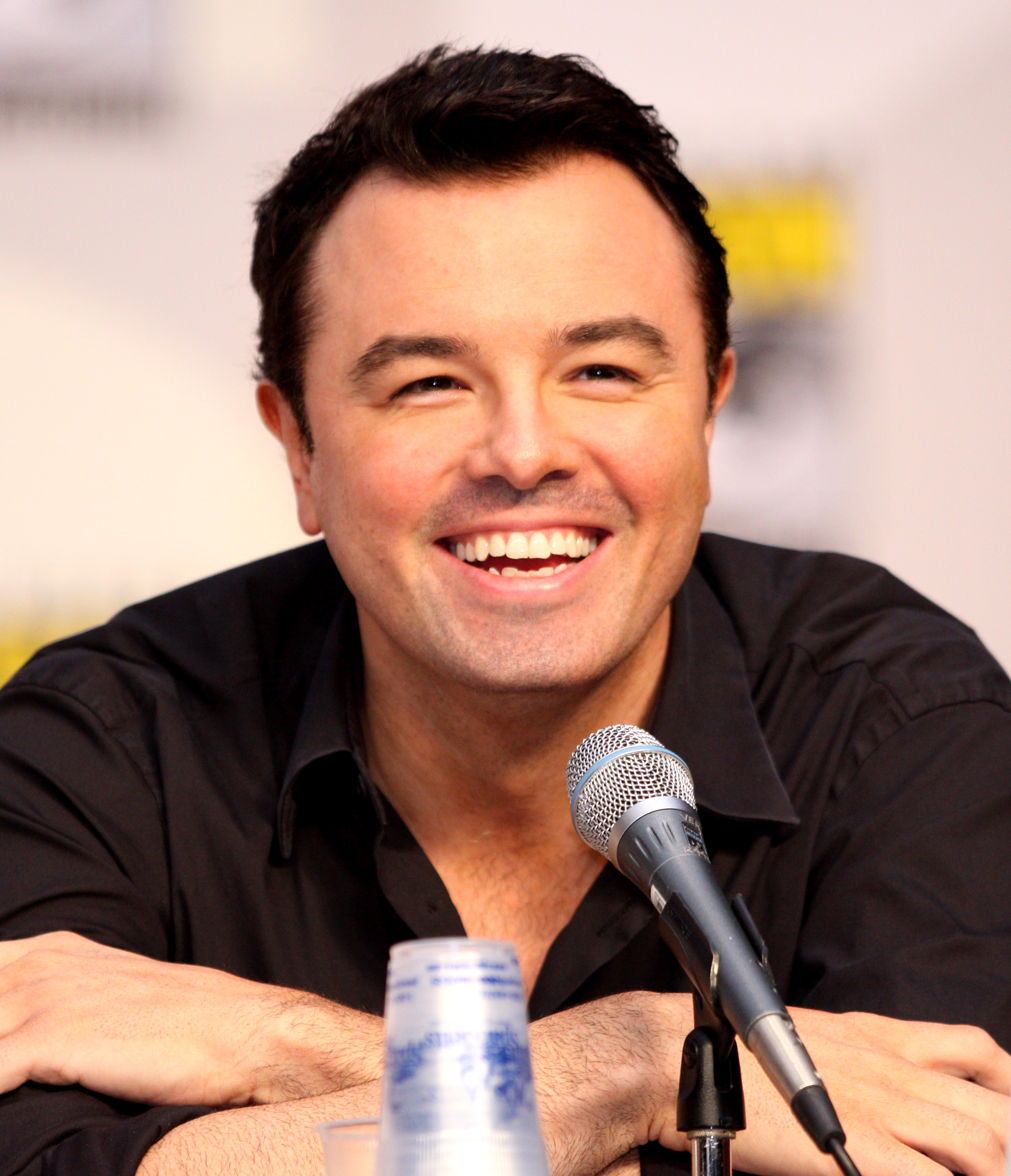
"Affliction" was the second appearance of Seth MacFarlane in Enterprise.

James Avery was cast as the Klingon General K'Vagh. He underwent a three-hour make-up process for the role, something he later described as a nightmare. He had previously been involved with Star Trek in 1987, when he was the runner up to Michael Dorn to be cast as Worf in The Next Generation. He became better known as Philip Banks in The Fresh Prince of Bel-Air. "Affliction" also featured a cameo by Marc Worden as a Klingon prisoner, who had previously appeared in the Deep Space Nine episodes "Sons and Daughters" and "You Are Cordially Invited" as Worf's son, Alexander Rozhenko.

John Schuck was cast as the Klingon doctor Antaak, having previously appeared as the Klingon Ambassador in both Star Trek IV: The Voyage Home and Star Trek VI: The Undiscovered Country. Schuck had also appeared in episodes of both Deep Space Nine and Voyager. Eric Pierpoint had previously appeared in several episodes of Star Trek across the various television series, including the TNG episode "Liaisons" as well as episodes of DS9 and Voyager. He had also appeared in the Enterprise episode "Rogue Planet".

Brad Greenquist appeared as a Rigelian in this episode in his second appearance on Enterprise, he too had also previously appeared in episodes of DS9 and Voyager. The other Rigelians were played by stuntmen Brian Williams and Tom Dupont, whilst Linda Park was stunt-doubled by Diana Inosanto. It was the second appearance of Seth MacFarlane, the creator of the animated television show Family Guy, in a role in Enterprise. He had previously appeared as an unnamed character in the third-season episode "The Forgotten" but gains the name Ensign Rivers in "Affliction".

== Reception ==
"Affliction" originally aired on UPN, on February 18, 2005. It received a 1.8/3% share among adults between the ages of 18 and 49. This means that it was seen by 1.8 percent of all 18- to 49-year-olds, and three percent of all 18- to 49-year-olds watching television at the time of the broadcast. This equals the ratings received by the previous episode, "The Aenar", which received the highest ratings of the fourth season so far. It finished behind programs on NBC, The WB, ABC, CBS and Fox.

IGN gave the episode 3.5 out of five, and called it "Another strong, solid episode of a series that is only getting better from week to week." Michelle Erica Green reviewed this episode for TrekNation, and described it as a "rollicking good ride". Green thought that linking the reason for the Klingons' appearance change to the augmented humans from earlier in the season was a clever idea, but the introduction of Section 31 was suspect as they hadn't been mentioned at all through the season three Xindi arc. She was pleased with the level of detail shown on screen, such as the computer-generated targs and Tucker changing the patch on his uniform when he transfers to the Columbia. Green said that John Billingsley "excels" in this episode, and that the ending was "perfect". Jamahl Epsicokhan on his website Jammer's Reviews, gave the episode a score of three out of four, saying that it was "solid and entertaining, but with no real signs of greatness" and thought that the cliffhanger ending was unnecessary.

The two part story featuring the episodes "Affliction" and "Divergence" were ranked the fifth best story of Enterprise by Den of Geek writer James Hunt. Variety commended the performance of James Avery, noted for his role on the Fresh Prince of Bel Air, as a Klingon General. Den of Geek recommended "Affliction" and "Singularity" for the development of the character Malcolm Reed. In his 2023 rewatch Keith DeCandido of Tor.com gave it 8 out of 10.

In a SyFy interview, some of the cast recommended this episode as a favorite.

== Home media release ==
This episode was released on home media on DVD, as part of the season four box set on November 1, 2005, in the United States, and on Blu-ray, released on April 1, 2014.
