= The Aenar =

- Star Trek: Enterprise episode
- Episode no.: Season 4 Episode 14
- Directed by: Mike Vejar
- Story by: Manny Coto
- Teleplay by: André Bormanis
- Production code: 414
- Original air date: February 11, 2005

Guest appearances
- Jeffrey Combs as Commander Shran; Alexandra Lydon as Jhamel; Brian Thompson as Admiral Valdore; Geno Silva as Senator Vrax; Alicia Adams as Lissan; Scott Allen Rinker as Gareb

Episode chronology
← Previous "United"	Next → "Affliction"
- Star Trek: Enterprise season 4

"The Aenar" is the fourteenth episode of the fourth season of the American science fiction television series Star Trek: Enterprise, and originally aired on UPN on February 11, 2005. It was written by André Bormanis from a story by Manny Coto, and was directed by Mike Vejar. "The Aenar" was the third installment of a three-part story which concluded the events of episodes "Babel One" and "United".

Set in the 22nd century, the series follows the adventures of the first Starfleet starship Enterprise. In this episode, Captain Jonathan Archer (Scott Bakula) and Commander Shran (Jeffrey Combs) travel to Andoria, a moon, seeking the help of the Aenar—an offshoot race of the Andorians—one of whom has been taken by the Romulans to pilot a drone vessel (first seen in the previous episode).

The episode showed the home world of the Andorians for the first time, with the sets for the planet's ice tunnels being created on a sound stage. Alexandra Lydon and Alicia Adams made their first Star Trek appearances in "The Aenar". Reviews were mostly negative, with critics citing issues with plot holes and unanswered questions from the story arc. About 3.17 million households watched its first airing.

== Plot ==
Senator Vrax (Geno Silva), fresh from the Romulan Senate, is disappointed that Admiral Valdore (Brian Thompson) and scientist Nijil's (J. Michael Flynn) drone program has failed to provoke a rift between Human, Andorian, Vulcan and Tellarite races as they had hoped (seen in "Babel One" and "United"). In fact, the opposite has happened – political discord throughout the Alpha and Beta Quadrants has declined. Now that a second drone vessel is ready to be launched, Valdore suggests a mission against the Enterprise in order to impress the Senate. Nijil argues that the pilot requires time to recover from his previous exertions, but Valdore insists and prioritizes the mission.

On Enterprise, analysis of data gathered in the previous encounter with the Romulan ship reveals that the ship is being piloted telepathically by an Andorian. Commander Shran (Jeffrey Combs) explains that the data indicates that the pilot is probably a member of the Aenar, a white-skinned and blind Andorian sub-race. This seems unlikely, since the Aenar are few in number, reclusive pacifists, and inhabitants of the isolated extreme northern polar region of their moon. Shran and Captain Jonathan Archer (Scott Bakula) then beam down to contact the Aenar. The Aenar's spokesperson, Lissan (Alicia Adams), initially declines to assist as the Aenar do not want to get involved in a war. A young Aenar named Jhamel (Alexandra Lydon) decides to help, since doing so may help locate Gareb (Scott Allen Rinker), her missing brother.

Meanwhile, Doctor Phlox (John Billingsley), Commander T'Pol (Jolene Blalock), and Commander Charles "Trip" Tucker III (Connor Trinneer) work in Sickbay on their own "telepresence" unit to help counter the drone ship. T'Pol volunteers to test it, and a concerned Tucker finds it increasingly difficult to balance his duties and emotions. Jhamel then tests the unit, with better results. Later, when the drone ships reappear and attack, she is able to contact the drone pilot, and it is indeed her long-lost brother, who was tricked into working with the Romulans. Learning the deception of his "helpers", he turns the drones on each other and both are soon destroyed, and Valdore angrily kills him in retribution. With the threat resolved, the Andorians depart Enterprise. Tucker requests a transfer to the Columbia, which Archer reluctantly grants.

== Production ==
"The Aenar" was the third and final part in the Romulan story arc, comprising "Babel One", "United" and "The Aenar". It was written by André Bormanis from a story by show runner Manny Coto. Bormanis had also written "Babel One", and earlier in the season the episode "Awakening", which formed part of the Vulcan story arc. "The Aenar" was directed by Mike Vejar, his third episode of the season.

This episode was the first time the homeworld of the Andorian race was represented on screen. The race had been introduced in the Star Trek: The Original Series second-season episode "Journey to Babel". The interior of a sound stage was fitted out to appear like caverns on the ice world as it was theorized that this was the environment in which a race such as the Andorians, including the Aenar sub-species, could have evolved. These sets were enhanced in post-production using computer-generated imagery.

Filming began on November 22, 2004, and was completed on December 2, with the production being halted for two days due to Thanksgiving. The majority of the guest stars from earlier installments of the trilogy returned for "The Aenar", and they were joined by Alexandra Lydon and Alicia Adams, who were both making their first appearances in a Star Trek series. Kim Koski was the stunt double for Jeffrey Combs during a scene in which Shran was impaled through the leg by a stalagmite.

== Reception ==
"The Aenar" was first aired in the United States on UPN on February 11, 2005. It was watched by 3.17 million viewers, which was an increase on the 2.81 million viewers who watched the previous episode. The following episode, "Affliction", received around the same number of viewers as "The Aenar".

Michelle Erica Green, while writing for the website TrekNation, thought that the episode had strong character development despite the other flaws present. She felt that it opened up a number of questions about the abilities of the Andorians due to their similarity to the Aenar, and enjoyed the issues present in the Tucker/T'Pol relationship. Although she said that it was the "weakest" of the story arc, it was also the most "gripping". Jamahl Epsicokhan, at his website Jammer's Reviews, gave the episode two out of four, adding that "The Aenar" was "aimless" since the majority of the storyline ended in the previous episode. He found fault with the plot, as the Romulan threat was unspecific, and because of several plot holes which the episode failed to explain.

== Home media release ==
"The Aenar" was released on home media in the United States on November 1, 2005, as part of the season four DVD box set of Enterprise. The Blu-ray edition was released on April 1, 2014.
