= Babel One =

- Star Trek: Enterprise episode
- Episode no.: Season 4 Episode 12
- Directed by: David Straiton
- Written by: Mike Sussman; André Bormanis
- Production code: 412
- Original air date: January 28, 2005

Guest appearances
- Jeffrey Combs - Commander Shran; Lee Arenberg - Tellarite Ambassador Gral; Molly Brink - Lieutenant Talas; J. Michael Flynn - Nijil; Brian Thompson - Admiral Valdore; Kevin Brief - Naarg

Episode chronology
| ← Previous "Observer Effect" | Next → "United" |
- Star Trek: Enterprise season 4

"Babel One" is the twelfth episode of the fourth season of the American science fiction television series Star Trek: Enterprise, and originally aired on UPN on January 28, 2005. The episode was written by Mike Sussman and André Bormanis, and directed by David Straiton. "Babel One" was the first of a three-part story which continued in the episodes "United" and "The Aenar". The arc was intended to precede the Romulan War which had been mentioned in previously aired episodes of the franchise, while "Babel One" was a reference to the Star Trek: The Original Series episode "Journey to Babel".

Set in the 22nd century, the series follows the adventures of the first Starfleet starship Enterprise, registration NX-01. In this episode, Enterprise is ferrying a Tellarite Ambassador, when they respond to distress calls from Andorian vessel under attack. Pursuing the mysterious attacking vessel, they begin to uncover a plot to derail cooperative relations between the Tellarites, Andorians and humans.

The guest cast included several actors who had previously appeared in the franchise, including Lee Arenberg, Brian Thompson and Jeffrey Combs. It also featured Molly Brink for the second time as Lieutenant Talas. The episode required extensive make-up for the guest cast playing various alien characters. Reviewers were positive about the episode, calling it an improvement on the previous week's "Observer Effect", and praised the ending. Although Nielsen ratings of 1.7/3 percent showed an improvement over the previous episode, the number of actual viewers was the lowest yet for the series with 2.53 million watching the episode on the first broadcast.

== Plot ==
It is November 2154, and Captain Archer and Ensign Sato spend time preparing for the arrival of Ambassador Gral and the Tellarite delegation, by practicing being blunt, complaining, and arguing. En route to the trade summit on "Babel One", they detect a distress call from the Andorian warship, Kumari, now under attack. Enterprise alters its course to assist, and arrives to find Commander Shran, Lieutenant Talas, and 17 other survivors in escape-pods. Archer goes to meet him in Sickbay, and an angry Shran claims that both the Andorian Ambassador's and his ship were attacked and destroyed by a powerful Tellarite vessel.

Scans of the debris indicate Tellarite weapon signatures, and recovered sensor data shows a Tellarite vessel firing. With both delegations on board, and accusations of duplicity rising between the groups, Archer considers taking the Andorians to their homeworld. At full warp, Enterprise is suddenly attacked by an Andorian ship. When attempts at communicating fail, Archer demands that Shran intervene — he complies by explaining how to knock out its shields — but the attempt is ineffective. Enterprise is spared only when the attacking ship has to retreat because of a fluctuating power grid. T'Pol then notices that the "Andorian" and "Tellarite" ships have the same energy signature. The alien vessel is then tracked, and it appears to be capable of holographically disguising itself. Shran is unconvinced, and using Talas as a distraction, manages to escape and capture Gral, before order is restored. However, when Archer convinces Shran to examine the evidence, a member of the Tellarite delegation is able to wrest a weapon from Talas, and shoots her.

Meanwhile, Commander Tucker, Lieutenant Malcolm Reed and two MACOs beam aboard the ship, only to find it deserted and without life support. Although the MACOs are beamed back, the transporter is damaged before Tucker and Reed can be rescued. They are able to locate an oxygen supply within the ship's systems, but become stranded when the vessel warps away, and make their way to an empty bridge. On Romulus, it is revealed that the ship is actually a drone, controlled by a pilot under the command of Romulan Admiral Valdore, supported by a scientist called Nijil, in an attempt to prevent a regional détente.

== Production ==
The episode was written by Mike Sussman and André Bormanis. The duo had previously collaborated on several episodes, the most recent of which season three's "Hatchery". Meanwhile, they had written episodes individually, with Sussman writing three episodes so far during season four and Bormanis penning "Awakening". "Babel One" was directed by David Straiton, his third in season four after the second part of "Storm Front" as well as the stand-alone episode "Daedalus".

Filming began on November 2, 2004 and lasted until November 10. The first scene filmed was on the Andorian bridge, which had been used in previous episodes but was made to look battle damaged for this episode. Other sets used included the standing sets to represent the Enterprise, as well as new sets showing the interior of the Romulan vessel. The title of the episode was an intentional reference to the Star Trek: The Original Series episode "Journey to Babel". The three-part story was intended to represent a precursor to the Romulan Wars, which had been referenced in "Balance of Terror" and "The Defector".

=== Casting and make-up ===
The guest cast included a number of Star Trek alumni. Jeffrey Combs returned to his recurring role of Shran, for his second appearance during season four. Joining him as a returning Andorian was Molly Brink, who had previously appeared as Talas in the episode "Proving Ground". Brian Thompson played the Romulan Valdore, having previously appeared in Star Trek: The Next Generation and Star Trek: Deep Space Nine as well as the film Star Trek Generations. Another Deep Space Nine actor who portrayed a new character in this episode was Lee Arenberg. He had previously appeared in a variety of roles across the franchise, three times as a Ferengi in The Next Generation and Deep Space Nine (including one, coincidentally also named Gral, no relation to the Tellarite Gral he plays here). He also appeared as a Malon, Pelk, in the Star Trek: Voyager episode "Juggernaut".

The guest cast required a variety of levels of make-up to portray their alien characters. Combs' make-up took around three and a half hours each day, as did the Tellarite prosthetics. The Andorian female cast members took around four and a half hour each day to get into make-up and costume, but on the first day, Brink required further make-up time as that day's shoot required her to appear in-character in her underwear. This meant that after the normal make-up schedule, she was sprayed blue from head to toe. At the end of that day's filming, the shower facilities at the studio's executive gym were used to remove the paint. Meanwhile, the Romulan make-up took three hours to apply, with all the relevant scenes completed in a single day.

== Reception ==
"Babel One" was first aired in the United States on UPN on January 28, 2005. The episode received a Nielsen rating of 1.7/3 percent. This means that it was seen by 1.7 percent of all households, and three percent of all of those watching television at the time of the broadcast. This was an increase in ratings compared to the previous week's episode, but saw a lower overall number of viewers. "Babel One" was watched by 2.53 million viewers, the lowest overall number of viewers to date for a first run episode of Enterprise.

Michelle Erica Green in her review for TrekNation enjoyed the interaction between Shran and Graal, and thought it was an improvement over the previous week's "Observer Effect". She also compared it to The Original Series episode "Journey to Babel", which she watched immediately prior to the Enterprise episode. She said: "On the surface "Babel One" has a very similar plot, yet it plays out like an original take on the situation rather than a retread." Jamahl Epsicokhan at his website Jammer's Reviews thought that the majority of the episode was "passable" but ultimately ended on a "good note" due to the twist in the ending. However, he criticised the promotional campaign by UPN, as he felt that the trailer for the episode had the "unfortunate effect of making the first 30 minutes of the plot extremely obvious to us, forcing us to watch in frustration while the characters put the pieces together". He gave the episode a rating of three out of four.

== Home media ==
The first home media release of the episode was on DVD; having been released as part of the season four box set on November 1, 2005 in the United States. The Blu-ray edition was released on April 1, 2014.
