= Romulan =

Extraterrestrial humanoid species in the Star Trek franchise

Romulans
- Star Trek race
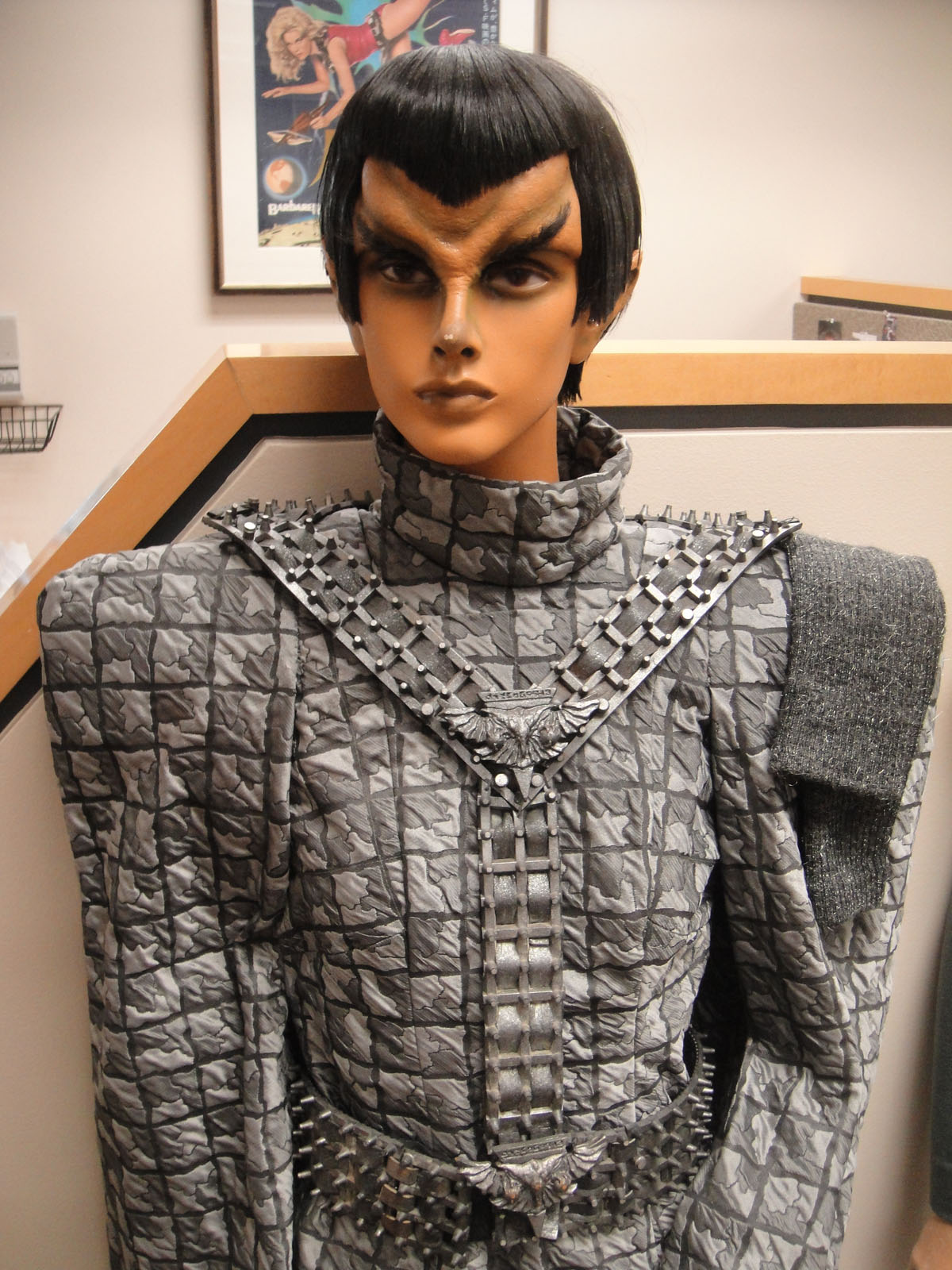
- A mannequin of a Romulan, as they appeared in the television series Star Trek: The Next Generation
- Created by: Paul Schneider

In-universe information
- Quadrant: Beta
- Home world: Romulus

The Romulans (/ˈrɒmjʊlənz, -jə-/) are an extraterrestrial race in the American science fiction franchise Star Trek. Their adopted home world is Romulus, and within the same star system they have settled a sister planet Remus. They first appeared in the series Star Trek (1966–1969). They have appeared in most subsequent Star Trek releases, including The Animated Series, The Next Generation, Deep Space Nine, Voyager, Enterprise, Discovery, Picard, Strange New Worlds, and Lower Decks. They appear in the Star Trek feature films Star Trek V: The Final Frontier (1989), Star Trek VI: The Undiscovered Country (1991), Star Trek: Nemesis (2002) and Star Trek (2009). They also appear in various other spin-off media, including books, comics, toys and games.

Writer Paul Schneider created the Romulans for the 1966 Star Trek episode "Balance of Terror". As a basis, he considered what the ancient Roman Empire might have looked like had it developed to the point of spaceflight. Physically, the Romulans were presented as humanoid, but the show's make-up department gave them pointed ears to distinguish them from humans. In the series, which is set in the 23rd century, the Romulans were speculated as having split from another alien species, the Vulcans, in the distant past. In contrast to the Vulcans, who were presented as peaceful and logic-oriented philosopher scientists, the Romulans were depicted as militaristic, having founded an interstellar empire. The Romulans were used as antagonists for the series' protagonists, the starship USS Enterprise, her crew, and their government, the United Federation of Planets.

In 1987, the writers of Star Trek: The Next Generation—set in the 24th century—again used the Romulans as antagonists of the Federation. The show's designers gave the Romulans new costumes and added a V-shaped ridge on the foreheads of most Romulan characters, though with indications that Romulans without the ridges also existed. In the series Star Trek: Enterprise, Romulans without ridges are depicted as passing for Vulcans (who do not have ridges either). The 2009 film Star Trek depicted the Romulan homeworld, Romulus, being destroyed by a supernova in the year 2387. This film featured Romulans without the head ridges. The impact of Romulus's destruction forms a plot-theme in the series Star Trek: Picard.

== History ==
=== Original development ===
The Romulans are a fictional extraterrestrial species in the Star Trek universe and were devised for the episode "Balance of Terror". They were reused for the second-season episode "The Deadly Years" and the third-season episode "The Enterprise Incident".

They are humanoid beings originating from the planet Romulus and are known for their cunning, secrecy, and often adversarial relations with other civilizations, especially the United Federation of Planets. Physiologically, Romulans are similar to Vulcans, another species in the Star Trek universe. In fact, Romulans share a common ancestry with Vulcans and are considered an offshoot of the same species. They have pointed ears and arched eyebrows, and possess great strength, intelligence, and longevity.

The Romulans diverged from their Vulcan counterparts millennia ago due to ideological differences. While Vulcans embraced logic and the teachings of Surak, advocating emotional control and pacifism, the Romulans rejected these principles. They embraced their emotions and maintained a more militaristic and secretive society. Romulans are known for their cunning strategies, espionage, and manipulation in political affairs. They have a powerful and formidable military, with their signature warbird starships being a symbol of their might.

Throughout various Star Trek series and films, the Romulans have been portrayed as complex adversaries with deep-seated cultural traditions and a sense of superiority over other species. Their interactions with other factions in the Star Trek universe often involve political intrigue, espionage, and attempts to expand their influence in the galaxy.

While based on the Roman Empire, they took on the adversarial role of Cold War era Communist China, with the fictional government the United Federation of Planets playing the role of the United States, and the Klingons, based on the Mongol Empire, acting the role of the Soviet Union. As a result, the Romulans were generally portrayed as mysterious, but also "highly militaristic, aggressive by nature, and ruthless in warfare". The make-up required for an episode including Romulans in the Original Series became too expensive and time-consuming, so the Romulans became largely overshadowed by the Klingons.

=== Reintroduction in the 1980s and 1990s ===
After the launch of Star Trek: The Next Generation in 1987, the show's writers introduced the Romulans in the final episode of the first season, "The Neutral Zone", which aired in the U.S. in May 1988. The episode was written by Maurice Hurley, who later acknowledged rushing it, putting together a script in a day and a half. In the episode, which is set in the year 2364, the Starfleet ship USS Enterprise-D—whose crew are the series' main protagonists—responds to the disappearance of Federation colonies along the Neutral Zone, fearing that it reflects growing Romulan activity in the region. Investigating, the Enterprise crew encounter a Romulan spaceship; it is stated that this is the first encounter between the two peoples for 53 years. The Romulans reveal that they have had colonies destroyed on their side of the border too, and the two species agree to share information on the issue in future. In later episodes it is revealed that these colonies were destroyed by a previously unknown species, the Borg, whom the show's writers had devised as a new alien antagonist following dissatisfaction with their previous attempt, the Ferengi. Initial thoughts by the script-writers had proposed a multi-episode storyline in which the Federation and Romulan governments would co-operate to fight the Borg; ultimately only certain elements of this idea entered "The Neutral Zone", and the Borg would be introduced not in the first season, but in the second-season episode "Q Who".

New costumes were designed for the actors playing Romulans, created by the show's costume designer William Theiss. The newly designed Romulan ship that appeared in "The Neutral Zone" was built as a miniature model by Greg Jein. The ship featured a newly designed Romulan crest, featuring a stylised bird of prey clutching two planets, Romulus and Remus, in its claws. Later in the series, this ship type would be explicitly referred to as a "warbird". In 1989, AMT released a plastic kit of the vessel, alongside other kits for a Ferengi ship and a Klingon bird of prey vessel.

The Romulans were re-used for the second-season episode "Contagion", written by Steve Gerber and Beth Woods and first aired in March 1989. In this episode, the Enterprise-D entered the Neutral Zone to answer a distress call and ends up in conflict with a Romulan vessel, with both spaceships being disabled by an alien computer virus. "Contagion" was the first episode in the Star Trek franchise in which the Romulan ship was given a name, in this case the Haakona. In the third-season episode "The Enemy", written by David Kemper and Michael Piller and first screened in November 1989, the Enterprise-D is depicted rescuing a crashed Romulan ship. The episode introduced the Romulan character Tomalak, played by Andreas Katsulas, who would reappear in three further Next Generation episodes. It also further established the idea of a significant enmity between the Romulans and the Klingons, with the Enterprise's Klingon officer, Worf (Michael Dorn), refusing to donate blood to save the life of an injured Romulan; the scriptwriters had debated whether to include this, with Dorn initially reticent.

Three episodes later, in "The Defector", written by Ronald D. Moore and first screened in January 1990, a Romulan admiral is presented as seeking to defect to the Federation. The episode is the first in the franchise to include images of Romulus itself and introduced the design of a Romulan scout vessel. "The Defector" also includes a reference to the Battle of Cheron, an incident in the 22nd century Earth-Romulan War that was previously mentioned in "Balance of Terror".

==== Deep Space Nine and Voyager ====
For "The Search", the opening two-part episode of the third season of Star Trek: Deep Space Nine, a Romulan link was introduced. The episode, which was written by Ira Steven Behr, Robert Hewitt Wolfe, and Ronald D. Moore, featured the introduction of a new Starfleet ship, the USS Defiant; the scriptwriters included the idea that it had been equipped with a cloaking device by the Romulans in return for intelligence that the Federation gathered on another alien power, the Dominion. A Romulan character, T'Rul (Martha Hackett), was included to oversee the device's use aboard the Defiant. The show's writers had initially planned on including T'Rul as a permanent fixture on the show but decided that she did not offer enough potential for new storylines.

The Romulans were reused later that season in "Visionary", where they are presented as attempting to destroy the Deep Space Nine space station as part of their plan to collapse the nearby wormhole and thus prevent a Dominion invasion of the Alpha Quadrant, the region of space where both the Federation and Romulans reside. Three episodes later, the follow-on episodes "Improbable Cause" and "The Die Is Cast" again featured the Romulans, in this case portraying a joint mission by the Romulan Tal Shiar and Cardassian Obsidian Order to fatally cripple the Dominion by eradicating its leaders, the Founders. For these episodes, new Tal Shiar outfits were designed; Moore related that this was partly his decision, for he "hated, underline hated, the Romulan costumes [introduced in the first season of The Next Generation]. Big shoulder pads, the quilting, I just loathed it". Costume designer Robert Blackman noted that his team created eight new Romulan uniforms, using the same fabric as the old ones but "dyed it down slightly, and we made them much sleeker and a little more menacing".

==== Star Trek: Nemesis ====
The Romulans were the major antagonists in the 2002 film Star Trek: Nemesis , with much of the action set on Romulus. The film also introduced the Remans, inhabitants of the other planet in the Romulan system, who serve as a slave labor caste in Romulan society.

==== Star Trek: Enterprise ====
In season 4, the Romulans played a pivotal role in the episodes "Kir'Shara", "Babel One", "United", and "The Aenar". In "Kir'Shara", it's revealed that Administrator V'Las of the Vulcan High Command is actually conspiring with a Romulan agent to "reunify" their two peoples through force. The agent, Major Talok, chases Captain Archer, T'Pol and T'Pau through the area of Vulcan known as The Forge throughout the episode, although his true nature isn't revealed until the end. In addition, in the previous episode "Awakening", Archer learned from Surak that during the "Time of Awakening", a Vulcan schism of those who "sought a return to savage ways" and "marched beneath the raptor's wings" (later the symbol of the Romulan people) perpetrate a cataclysmic nuclear attack upon Surak and his enlightened society. Soon after Surak's death, these Vulcan recidivists abandoned their homeworld to colonize the planets Romulus and Remus.

In "Babel One", "United", and "The Aenar", the Romulans plot to destabilize their sector of space by using drone ships disguised as vessels from various cultures to turn their enemies against each other. These drone ships are piloted remotely through telepresence by Gareb, a young Aenar kidnapped by the Romulans who had lied to him that he was the last of his people. The plot was exposed by the efforts of the Enterprise crew and instead resulted in the humans, Vulcans, Andorians, and Tellarites uniting to defeat the Romulan threat, bringing them closer together than ever. The Enterprise then enlists the help of Gareb's sister Jhamel who telepathically contacts her brother and informs him of the truth. Gareb turns on the Romulans, destroying one drone ship and allowing the Enterprise to destroy the other, foiling the Romulan plot. In retaliation, Romulan Admiral Valdore kills Gareb for his betrayal.

=== Reboot: 2009–present ===
For the 2009 Star Trek reboot film, the design of the Romulans was significantly altered; although keeping the pointed ears, the V-shaped forehead ridges were removed and various tattoos were added.

After Star Trek: Nemesis proved a financial failure and Star Trek: Enterprise was cancelled, the franchise's executive producer Rick Berman and screenwriter Erik Jendresen began developing a new film entitled Star Trek: The Beginning, which was to be set during the 22nd century Earth–Romulan War. The project never materialised. Instead, the decision was made to reboot the series by creating a film using the characters of the original Star Trek series but played by new actors. Putting together a script for the new film, the director J. J. Abrams stated that he wanted Romulans to be the antagonists because they had featured less than the Klingons in the original Star Trek series. The film's writers, Roberto Orci and Alex Kurtzman, thought that it would feel backward to demonize the Klingons as villains again after they had been presented heroically in later Star Trek series; they also wanted to use Spock as a central character in the film and believed that the Romulan presence would continue Spock's story from his last chronological appearance in "Unification".

In the 2009 Abrams reboot film, titled Star Trek, the planet Romulus is destroyed by a supernova in the year 2387. A Romulan mining ship, the Narada, survives and travels back in time to the 23rd century; its commander, Nero (Eric Bana), is committed to destroying the planet Vulcan to punish Spock for failing to save Romulus. The actors playing Romulans in this film wore three prosthetics applied to their ears and foreheads, while Bana had a fourth prosthetic for the bitemark on his ear that extends to the back of his character's head. The film's Romulans lacked the V-shaped ridges on the foreheads, which had been present in all of their depictions outside the original series. Neville Page wanted to honor that by having Nero's crew ritually scar themselves too, forming keloids reminiscent of the "V"-ridges. It was abandoned as they did not pursue the idea enough.

Picard's reaction to the destruction of Romulus is the backstory and central premise of Star Trek: Picard. The series begins with Picard in self-imposed exile at his French vineyard following his resignation in protest to Starfleet's handling of Romulans and androids. Picard has two live-in Romulans at his estate. At least two groups of Romulans survived: one group formed the Romulan Free State, while the other group was evacuated to the planet of Vashti.

In the Star Trek: Discovery episode "Unification III", Ambassador Spock's dream of Vulcan/Romulan reunification has been achieved. The Romulans have returned to their ancestral homeworld (since renamed Ni'Var) and reunified with their Vulcan cousins. When the Vulcans decided to pull out of the Federation due to the apocalyptic event known as the Burn, it was actually the Romulans who wished to remain, according to Starfleet Admiral Vance. In the episode "All Is Possible", Ni'Var rejoins the Federation.

== Romulan Warbird ==
Romulan Warbird

The Warbird was developed by Andrew Probert with the model built by Greg Jein. In the series it was introduced in the episode "The Neutral Zone" and seen on a recurring basis in the franchise from then on. In the Star Trek universe, it is twice as big as Picard's Enterprise D and is powered by an artificial quantum singularity. It is noted for its size and power in Star Trek by Picard and his crew. In 2017, Space.com said the Warbird was the ninth-best spacecraft in the Star Trek franchise. In 2020, CNET ranked the Romulan Warbird the 16th most powerful spacecraft in Star Trek.

== Romulan language ==
Two fictional languages have been constructed for the Romulans and Remans of the Star Trek franchise.

The first was created by Diane Duane for her non-canon series of novels called Rihannsu. In this imagining, it was an intentional creation, based on Old High Vulcan when the Romulans left Vulcan and established their own society. Duane describes it as sounding somewhat like Latin and Welsh.

The second was created by Trent Pehrson for the television series Star Trek: Picard. Its script is distinct from occasional glimpses of Romulan writing in earlier series. As of 2026, little information has been released about the language, though it is developed enough to be used for dialog in the show.

== Reception ==
In 2017, Den of Geek ranked Romulans the seventh best aliens out of 50 species from the Star Trek franchise, ahead of the Ferengi but behind the Q, and in first and second place respectively were the Vulcans and the Klingons.

== Other media ==
The Romulans have been the focus of a number of non-canon books and have appeared or been mentioned in other non-canon media. Among their key appearances have been:

- Diane Duane's miniseries Star Trek: Rihannsu, consisting of five books written between 1984 and 2006, is regarded as among the most detailed works focusing on the Romulans.
- In Dalla Van Hise's Killing Time (1985), the Romulans use time travel to alter history, which results in James T. Kirk becoming an ensign and Spock a starship captain.
- A prototype Romulan warbird is the focus of Simon Hawke's novel The Romulan Prize (1993).
- Robert Greenberger's The Romulan Stratagem (1995) involves Jean-Luc Picard and his crew competing with the Romulan officer Sela to convince a planet to join their respective states.
- In Diane Carey's Red Sector (1999), Spock and Leonard McCoy try to cure a virus that has infected the Romulan royal family.
- Josepha Sherman and Susan M. Schwartz's Vulcan's Heart (1999) involved Spock traveling to Romulus to aid the Romulan Commander from "The Enterprise Incident".
- Captain's Blood (2003), one of many collaborative works between Star Trek lead William Shatner and husband-and-wife team Judith and Garfield Reeves-Stevens, focused on the involvement of Kirk in preventing a Romulan civil war in the aftermath of Star Trek: Nemesis.
- The Tomed Incident is the focus of David R. George III's novel Serpents Among the Ruins (2003), which features the crew of the Enterprise-B.
- Star Trek: Vulcan's Soul is a trilogy written by Sherman and Shwartz between 2004 and 2007; set in the aftermath of the Dominion War, it focuses on members of Kirk's original crew becoming involved in a war between the Romulans and a fellow Vulcan offshoot, the Watraii.
- In the Star Trek: Titan novel Taking Wing (2005), the Romulan Star Empire collapses into civil war in the wake of Star Trek: Nemesis.
- The Star Trek: Titan novel The Red King (2005) opens with the disappearance of a Romulan fleet and features Donatra, the Romulan commander featured in Star Trek: Nemesis, working alongside William Riker and his crew.
- In the novel Kobayashi Maru (2008) by Michael A. Martin and Andy Mangels, Admiral Valdore attempts once again to cause conflict in the region approximately one year after the incident involving the Aenar, this time using a "telecapture" system, designed to take over and control enemy ships. Using three Klingon vessels, Valdore attacks Coalition of Planets allies hoping to weaken or destroy two enemies of the Romulan Star Empire by provoking a war. Captain Archer is eventually able to provide evidence of this Romulan deception. This is followed by yet another unsuccessful attempt to break apart the alliance which involves using telecaptured Vulcan cruisers against Proxima Centauri (a recent coalition member). In the book, the event that finally sparks the Coalition's declaration of war against the Romulans is the destruction of the Earth freighter Kobayashi Maru.
- The Romulan War: Beneath the Raptor's Wing is the sequel to Kobayashi Maru. Set between July 22, 2155 and July 22, 2156, it details the war between the Coalition of Planets and the Romulan Star Empire. The story focuses on the Romulan attempts at taking over the Coalition whilst the Vulcans who are aware they are vulnerable to the telecapture weapon withdraw from the fight early. The other Coalition members withdraw one by one in the face of continued losses, leaving it up to Earth Starfleet to stop the Romulan menace.
- In Star Trek Online, set in the year 2409, the Romulan survivor D'Tan (the adult version of a minor character from TNG episode "Unification II", played by Vidal Peterson) assisted in building a New Romulus after the destruction of the original homeworld twenty-two years prior. As part of rebuilding a new Romulan Republic, he became leader of the Romulan Unification Movement in an attempt to continue Ambassador Spock's work of bringing the Vulcan and Romulan people together.

== See also ==
- Weapons in Star Trek
