= Observer Effect (Star Trek: Enterprise) =

- Star Trek: Enterprise episode
- Episode no.: Season 4 Episode 11
- Directed by: Mike Vejar
- Written by: Judith Reeves-Stevens; Garfield Reeves-Stevens
- Production code: 411
- Original air date: January 21, 2005

Episode chronology
← Previous "Daedalus"	Next → "Babel One"
- Star Trek: Enterprise season 4

"Observer Effect" is the eleventh episode of the fourth season of the American science fiction television series Star Trek: Enterprise and the eighty-eighth overall. It was first aired on January 21, 2005, on UPN. It was written by Judith and Garfield Reeves-Stevens, and directed by Mike Vejar. Set in the 22nd century, the series follows the adventures of the first Starfleet starship, Enterprise, registration NX-01. This episode sees alien entities test the Enterprise crew by observing their reactions to a deadly silicon-based infection. Actual first contact with these aliens – the Organians – would occur about a century later, during the events of the original series Star Trek episode "Errand of Mercy".

As it was a bottle episode, the episode did not use any additional sets or guest stars with the intention of cutting down on costs for the series. This also gave time for the visual effects team to finish earlier work. The episode received mixed reactions from critics, with praise directed at the links to the original Star Trek series, while criticism directed towards some of the characterization of the characters. "Observer Effect" was watched by 2.76 million viewers on first broadcast, which formed part of an overall drop of viewers for the series.

== Plot ==
Lieutenant Reed and Ensign Mayweather play chess while serving as hosts to non-corporeal aliens known as Organians. Returning from an away mission on the planet below, Commander Tucker and Ensign Sato soon exhibit symptoms of a strange disease. Upon examination by Doctor Phlox, it is found to be a highly contagious silicon-based virus – which carbon-based physiology cannot counteract. To pass the time, while isolated in Decontamination, Tucker and Sato try to learn more about each other.

The Organians are keenly interested in examining the human response to this crisis, and compare notes to previous reactions by Klingons and Cardassians. They are members of an advanced species looking to make "first contact". For 800 years, the pair have been passively observing various space-faring species as they react to the pathogen, but no species has yet been deemed ready. Seeking a different view of the crew, they variably shift to the bodies of Captain Archer, Commander T'Pol and Phlox. The two Organians start to disagree: one is determined to maintain their non-interference protocol, while the other feels the protocol is outdated and unnecessary.

With time running out, Phlox and T'Pol find a way to disrupt the virus using deadly levels of radiation. Archer and Phlox, while wearing environmental suits, escort Tucker and Sato to Sickbay for treatment. Sato soon goes into cardiac arrest, and Archer removes his gloves and helmet to assist her, but she cannot be resuscitated. They then administer a dose of radiation to Tucker, but he dies too.

Suddenly, the Organians possess Tucker and Sato, explaining the situation to a surprised Archer, including the unstoppable spread of the infection. Archer pleads on behalf of his crew, pointing out that the Organians have lost empathy, confusing non-intervention after-the-fact with a harmful choice to not post warnings about the virus. They decide to modify their protocol, choosing to resurrect and cure the infected crew members, when they previously would have left the entire crew to die. They erase the encounter from the crew's memory. Archer orders a warning beacon to be placed above the planet, and the Organians leave to begin planning first contact with humans 100 years in the future.

== Production ==
"Observer Effect" was created as a bottle episode, the second in a row after "Daedalus". These episodes were intended to reduce costs on the series by not requiring additional set production. Unlike "Daedalus", "Observer Effect" also did not use any guest actors. It was the second to be written by Judith and Garfield Reeves-Stevens, who wrote a plot which brought back the Organians from the Star Trek: The Original Series episode "Errand of Mercy". The Organians were originally created for The Original Series by Gene L. Coon, and were intended as a balance to the Klingons. Mind replacement or mind invasion plotlines are common in science fiction. Other episodes in the Star Trek franchise exploring the theme include "Wolf in the Fold" and "Turnabout Intruder" from The Original Series, "Power Play" from Star Trek: The Next Generation and "Cathexis" from Star Trek: Voyager.

This was one of show runner Manny Coto's deliberate moves to link Enterprise closer to The Original Series during the fourth season. It was the second time that the crew of the Enterprise (NX-01) had met non-corporal entities following the second season episode "The Crossing". Filming began on the episode on October 22, 2004, and continued for the following seven working days. While the makeup department needed to present Park's and Trinneer's characters as they progressed through the sickness introduced by the Organians, the visual effects team was freed up to complete production on earlier episodes.

== Reception ==
=== Ratings ===
"Observer Effect" was first broadcast in the United States on January 21, 2005, on UPN. It was watched by 2.76 million viewers, which was a decrease from the 3.03 million who watched "Daedalus" but more than the 2.53 million viewers for the following episode, "Babel One".

=== Critical response ===
IGN gave the episode 4.5 out of five, and praised the episode saying it "manages to showcase a lot of the supporting characters" and concludes that it is "another giant step in the right direction."

Jamahl Epsicokhan, at his website Jammer's Reviews, described the plot of "Observer Effect" as not being as predictable as it might initially seem due to the crew's inability to save Tucker and Hoshi and their reliance on the aliens to do so. He felt that the links to "Errand of Mercy" were both "subtle" and "sublime", while describing the overall bottle show as "No slam-bang excitement; just a commitment to observation and plausible procedure." He adds that the episode was an example of "humanist science fiction" rather than an "adventure show".

Michelle Erica Green of TrekNation mostly liked the episode, stating "there was never the slightest problem with recognizing the distinct alien personalities, even though several actors played each Organian within the different host bodies. Jolene Blalock in particular was chilling picking up on Dominic Keating's portrayal of the same alien when it moved from Reed's body to T'Pol's. Connor Trinneer also did a nice job picking up on Anthony Montgomery's vocal inflections when possessed by the more open-minded Organian. This is one of the best possessed-by-aliens episodes that Star Trek has ever done", adding "...in terms of the regular cast's performances; these were subtle, strong in continuity and fun to watch." However, she had trouble following along sometimes when the characters were possessed, such as with Ensign Sato, while being possessed by the alien, began talking about a poker ring she used to run, believing the alien had run a poker ring at Starfleet. "My husband thought aloud that Sato must have been possessed by an alien when she started going on about the poker ring she used to run, and I agreed." She went on to indicate that she needed better clues given to her so that she would be able to tell when the characters were possessed and furthered believed that the transitions were occurring as they were talking, which did not occur during the episode. Furthering her occlusion of the show she states, "the biggest problem with the episode: these super-bright aliens only interact with the best of the best, the senior command crew. They don't take over the body of some ensign doing a grunt job cleaning the plasma manifolds, "thus ignoring the reason given within the show that non-essential senior crew would be better able to observe while not directly interfering.

Tor.com recommended "Observer Effect" as one of the better episodes of Enterprise, one that met the standards of a "good episode" of Star Trek, while noting some of the issues some audiences had with the show. Writing for The A.V. Club, Alasdair Wilkins included "Observer Effect" in his list of the twenty best episodes of the series. The Digital Fix said this episode was "very well done" and had "genuine tension" and tied into Star Trek lore.

Critic Darren Mooney offered much behind-the-scenes context: that two weeks after the air date, UPN announced the series was cancelled; that the initial script by the Reeves-Stevens team was rejected by Braga for its complexity; and points out that the many weaknesses, including the Organians in the episode reveal how the motivation for the characters' species name was to simply create another hook back to The Original Series. Mooney makes the point that though the script was written far in advance, there is a gloom to the episode where observers are watching the show around them die. Though stating that "Observer Effect" "was a much more effective bottle show than 'Daedalus' was", Mooney contends that the episode represents the cast and crew's acknowledgment that the show is dead, and all that is left is the waiting. He says the quote "somebody always dies" again echoes outside the bounds of the Enterprise starship. He further relates (by quoting writer Reeves-Stevens) how the entire body possession plot device was suggested by show runners Braga and Coto as a way "to save us some money", and indicates how the producers knew long before the network announcement that the shows being produced were "dead in the water".

== Home media release ==
"Observer Effect" was released on home media in the United States on November 1, 2005, as part of the season four DVD box set of Enterprise. The Blu-ray edition was released on April 1, 2014.
