= List of Star Trek aliens =

Extraterrestrials in the science fiction franchise

Xindi
- Star Trek race

In-universe information
- Home world: Xindus
- Language: Various native languages
- Affiliation: Sphere Builders (22nd century), United Federation of Planets (26th century)
- Leader: Governed by the Xindi Council

Star Trek is a science fiction media franchise that began with Gene Roddenberry's launch of the original Star Trek television series in 1966. Its success led to numerous films, novels, comics, and spinoff series. A major motif of the franchise involves encounters with various alien races throughout the galaxy. These fictional alien races are listed here.

Notable Star Trek races include Vulcans, Klingons, and the Borg. Some aspects of these fictional races became well known in American pop culture, such as the Vulcan salute and the Borg phrase, "Resistance is futile."

Star Trek aliens have been featured in Time magazine, which described how they are essential to the franchise's narrative.

== Key ==
Abbreviation	Title	Date(s)	Medium
TC	"The Cage" (Star Trek: The Original Series)	1966	TV
TOS	Star Trek: The Original Series	1966–1969	TV
TAS	Star Trek: The Animated Series	1973–1974	TV
TMP	Star Trek: The Motion Picture	1979	film
TWOK	Star Trek II: The Wrath of Khan	1982	film
TSFS	Star Trek III: The Search for Spock	1984	film
TVH	Star Trek IV: The Voyage Home	1986	film
TFF	Star Trek V: The Final Frontier	1989	film
TUC	Star Trek VI: The Undiscovered Country	1991	film
TNG	Star Trek: The Next Generation	1987–1994	TV
DS9	Star Trek: Deep Space Nine	1993–1999	TV
GEN	Star Trek Generations	1994	film
VOY	Star Trek: Voyager	1995–2001	TV
FC	Star Trek: First Contact	1996	film
INS	Star Trek: Insurrection	1998	film
NEM	Star Trek: Nemesis	2002	film
ENT	Star Trek: Enterprise	2001–2005	TV
ST09	Star Trek (2009)	2009	film
STID	Star Trek Into Darkness	2013	film
STB	Star Trek Beyond	2016	film
DSC	Star Trek: Discovery	2017–2024	TV
SHO	Star Trek: Short Treks	2018–2020	TV
PIC	Star Trek: Picard	2020–2023	TV
LOW	Star Trek: Lower Decks	2020–2024	TV
PRO	Star Trek: Prodigy	2021–2024	TV
SNW	Star Trek: Strange New Worlds	2022–present	TV
S31	Star Trek: Section 31	2025	film
SFA	Star Trek: Starfleet Academy	2026–present	TV

== A ==
Race	Description	Episodes (M = mention only)
Aenar	Andoria, Alpha Quadrant	"United" (ENT), "Strange New Worlds" (SNW)
Aenar	Aenar, along with the Andorians, inhabit the world of Andoria. In many regards, they are similar to the Andorians in physical appearance. Unlike the Andorians, their skin is light blue/white, they are almost blind, and they have powerful telepathic abilities. Aenar are pacifistic and do not use their mind-reading abilities against the will of another individual. Their blindness does not appear to hinder their abilities. Aenar government has little structure; leaders of Aenar society are chosen as the need arises, usually when contact with outsiders is called for. The Aenar are generally considered a different ethnicity of the Andorian race, not a separate species. The Aenar population is about 11,000 in size, and they inhabit the polar region of their world. Shran's daughter, Talla, from "These Are the Voyages..." (ENT), is a mixed-race individual of Andorian and Aenar origin and greenish in color, as is the Andorian in Star Trek: The Next Generation. Hemmer, the first Chief Engineer on the Enterprise in Strange New Worlds, is Aenar.	"United" (ENT), "Strange New Worlds" (SNW)
Andorian	Andoria, Alpha Quadrant	"Journey to Babel" (TOS), "United" (ENT)
Andorian	Main article: Andorian Andorians are a humanoid species with blue skin and antennae. They consider themselves a warrior race, contrasting with the pacifist Aenar. They are native to the moon Andoria, which orbits the planet Andor. They were a founding member of the United Federation of Planets.	"Journey to Babel" (TOS), "United" (ENT)
Angosian		"The Hunted" (TNG)
Angosian	Usually considered non-violent, Angosian authorities were responsible for genetically and chemically engineering soldiers to fight in their Tarsian Wars. Such process was irreversible, and the 'super soldiers' were considered outcasts and criminals that could not coexist alongside the normal population of Angosian society. As such, they were forced to be permanently confined to a penal settlement on an Angosian moon. A non-canon novel trilogy, Star Trek: The Q Continuum, shows that the Angosians have had some success in later efforts to reintegrate the soldiers, as one now serves on the Enterprise-E.	"The Hunted" (TNG)
Antedean	Antede III	"Manhunt" (TNG)
Antedean	The Antedeans from Antede III is an ichthyohumanoid species that resemble fish with a strong distaste for space flight. Although the Antedeans are a space-going race, space travel is quite traumatic. For individuals to deal with this problem, they induce a catatonic state while in space flight. To awaken from this state takes several hours. Once awakened from this sleep, Antedeans are generally greedy and eat large portions of vermicula. The Antedean race is divided over whether membership in the Federation is good.	"Manhunt" (TNG)
Arcadian		Star Trek IV: The Voyage Home
Arcadian	Arcadians have large, round, doll-like heads and have hair on the left and right sides of their heads with none in the middle. They are a member of the United Federation of Planets with a representative on the Federation Council. They joined at least as early as the 2280s.	Star Trek IV: The Voyage Home
Arcturian	Arcturus	Star Trek: The Motion Picture
Arcturian	Arcturians are known for their clones, which have the appearance of melted skin and originate from the densely populated world Arcturus. Nothing has been revealed about them in dialogue, so their backstory (by Fred Phillips and Robert Fletcher) is considered semi-canon.	Star Trek: The Motion Picture
Axanar		"Fight or Flight" (ENT), "Whom Gods Destroy" (TOS) M
Axanar	The Axanar are the first extraterrestrial race befriended by Earth people aboard the NX-01 Enterprise. One of James T. Kirk's earliest commendations is the Palm Leaf of Axanar Peace Mission, following the Battle of Axanar. However, the exact nature of the conflict is unrevealed; it is revealed in the episode "Whom Gods Destroy" that Starfleet Captain Garth of Izar achieved a great victory on behalf of the Federation, and his strategies became required reading at Starfleet Academy (since Kirk himself studied these strategies, the Battle of Axanar must thus have occurred well before Kirk entered Starfleet Academy in 2250, which was itself almost 20 years before "Whom Gods Destroy"). Kirk claims that the Axanar Peace Mission "topped [Garth's victory] with a greater one" and preserved the civilization that made Spock and himself "brothers," implying that the mission may have contributed to healing a severe rift in the Federation at that time.	"Fight or Flight" (ENT), "Whom Gods Destroy" (TOS) M

== B ==
Race	Description	Episodes (M = mention only)
Bajoran	Bajor (M-class)	"Ensign Ro" (TNG) "Emissary" (DS9)
Bajoran	Main article: Bajoran The Bajorans are a humanoid species with characteristic nose creases. They live on the planet Bajor. They are deeply spiritual people who worship The Prophets. They are enemies of the Cardassians, who occupied Bajor and treated the Bajorans as enslaved in the early 24th century. Time Magazine called the Bajorans "a proud people struggling to recover from another species's hostile occupation of their world."	"Ensign Ro" (TNG) "Emissary" (DS9)
Ba'ku	Unknown, The Briar Patch	Star Trek: Insurrection
Ba'ku	For broader coverage of this topic, see Star Trek: Insurrection § Plot. The Ba'ku people were a technologically advanced humanoid civilization. In the early 21st century, the race developed the means of building weapons of mass destruction and was on the brink of self-annihilation. A small enlightened group of the Ba'ku people escaped this horror and found an isolated planet. This group of Ba'ku followed a simple way of life and disdained the use of technology. (As shown in the film Star Trek: Insurrection, however, the Ba'ku still possessed some form of technology and the ability to use it in emergencies since they had attempted to repair the damaged Data.) At first, the Ba'ku were unaware of the metaphasic radiation in the planet's rings, which caused their aging process to decelerate significantly, although it was later discovered and cherished. The Ba'ku society consisted of strong bonds between individuals, as fewer than a thousand lived in a village. Their more straightforward way of life eventually prompted some of the younger Ba'ku villagers – who wanted to explore the galaxy with off-landers – to rebel against their elders, and an attempt was made to take over the village. When they were unsuccessful, they were exiled and eventually became the Son'a people. In 2375, peace on the Ba'ku planet was restored, and several members of the Son'a returned to their families.	Star Trek: Insurrection
Benzite	Benzar	"Coming of Age", "A Matter of Honor" (TNG)
Benzite	Benzites are a humanoid race from the planet Benzar, a member of the United Federation of Planets. Benzites possess smooth, hairless skin; they may range in color from bluish-purple to green-blue. A thick protrusion of the Benzite skull extends down over the face, displaying a prominent nasal lobe and brow. Two fish-like barbels droop down from above the upper lip. Benzites are highly resistant to poisons and other harmful substances. They can digest and derive nutrition from almost any organic compound. All Benzites from the same geostructure are physically similar, so much so that they are indistinguishable by non-Benzites.	"Coming of Age", "A Matter of Honor" (TNG)
Betazoid	Betazed	"Encounter at Farpoint" (TNG) "Tin Man" "Caretaker" (VOY) "Empathological Fallacies" (LOW)
Betazoid	The Betazoid are a humanoid species originating from the planet Betazed, a member of the United Federation of Planets. They are telepathic. Star Trek: The Next Generation features Counsellor Deanna Troi, a half-Betazoid half-human, as a prominent cast member and part of the bridge crew. She is featured in almost all TNG episodes and movies, and several episodes focus on the Betazoid people. These include shows with her mother, Lwaxana Troi. Her romantic interests, family, and personal life are plot elements in many Star Trek: The Next Generation episodes throughout the series. Episodes usually feature Troi using her telepathic abilities to help the crew better understand enemies and allies. Customs: The word Imzadi, meaning 'Beloved,' is often used between a Betazoid and their partner, whether they are of the same species or not. Betazoid weddings are conducted with the bride, groom, and several participants completely naked. The newlyweds possibly remain so for the duration of the honeymoon (TNG episode "Haven," novel The Persistence of Memory). A Betazoid woman's sex drive quadruples (at the least) when she reaches a certain age (TNG episode "Manhunt").	"Encounter at Farpoint" (TNG) "Tin Man" "Caretaker" (VOY) "Empathological Fallacies" (LOW)
Bolian	Bolarus IX	"Conspiracy" (TNG) "Emissary" (DS9) "Caretaker" (VOY)
Bolian	Bolians are humanoids with blue skin and a small ridge running from the back of their heads to their noses. They were named after a regular Star Trek director, Cliff Bole. As an in-joke, there have been references to the "Cliffs of Bole" on their planet. Neelix remarks that malfunctioning toilets will mainly affect the Bolians. During medical examinations, 24th-century doctors commonly ask if a human patient has had sexual relations with a Bolian. The Bolian world has been an active member of the Federation since 2320. Aside from contributing to the ranks of Starfleet, they have a delegation within the Diplomatic Corps. In 2366, the Bolian government was maintaining an uneasy truce with the Moropa (TNG: "Allegiance"). The Bolians are known to make crystal steel that is highly prized. They also own and operate the famous Bank of Bolius. In 2373, the Bolian government authorized the Ferengi Gaming Commission to manage their gambling emporiums. During the Bolian Middle Ages, the Bolians developed the medical philosophy known as the "Double Effect Principle" about euthanasia. This form of assisted suicide states that while euthanasia has the effect of relieving suffering, it also has the effect of causing death. Bolian marriages often involve more than two members. Any additional spouse is referred to as a "co-husband" or "co-wife." Bolian blues is a highly appreciated musical genre among Federation species.	"Conspiracy" (TNG) "Emissary" (DS9) "Caretaker" (VOY)
Borg	Unknown	"Q Who?" (TNG) "The Best of Both Worlds" (TNG) "I, Borg" (TNG) "Descent." (TNG) "Scorpion" (VOY) "Unimatrix Zero" (VOY) "Endgame" (VOY) "Regeneration" (ENT); Star Trek: First Contact
Borg	Main article: Borg (Star Trek) While encountered in the Enterprise episode "Regeneration," the Borg, a pseudo-species of cybernetically enhanced individuals, were not fully identified as the single greatest threat to the Federation until the events of The Next Generation episode "Q Who?". The Borg were discovered to be a group without individuality, where every member is a part of a collective consciousness in an attempt to achieve perfection. They assimilate any species they come into contact with for either biological aspects (for example, Talaxians would be incorporated for their dense physical structure, helpful in producing solid and resilient drones) or technological aspects (a species that has developed advanced engines or weaponry would be a sufficiently desirable target for assimilation) all in an attempt to improve further the overall perfection of the Borg as a whole. The Borg have encountered and assimilated thousands of species, quantity most notable by their designation of Species 8472, although more may have been added to the total since that encounter. The Borg are not a species but a collection of species. In their assimilated state, most races are altered or augmented with cybernetic enhancements that make them all look similar or instantly identifiable as Borg, making them a pseudo-species. Encounters with the Borg have varied in type, from the disastrous defense of the Wolf 359 system ("The Best of Both Worlds"), in which many Federation ships were lost, the successful repelling of two Borg cubes from Sector 001 on two separate occasions ("The Best of Both Worlds" "Star Trek: First Contact") and the infiltration, usage of and destruction of a Borg transwarp hub (a critical part of their interstellar menace) by the USS Voyager ("Endgame").	"Q Who?" (TNG) "The Best of Both Worlds" (TNG) "I, Borg" (TNG) "Descent." (TNG) "Scorpion" (VOY) "Unimatrix Zero" (VOY) "Endgame" (VOY) "Regeneration" (ENT); Star Trek: First Contact
Breen	Breen, Alpha Quadrant	"Season 7 (1998–99)" (DS9) "Trusted Sources" (LOW)
Breen	Main article: Breen (Star Trek) The Breen are a mysterious race who joined the Dominion during the Dominion War.	"Season 7 (1998–99)" (DS9) "Trusted Sources" (LOW)
Brikar	Unknown	Season 1 (PROD)
Brikar	Brikar are a large, rock-like species. First-known examples are both young: 8-year-old Rok-Tahk from Star Trek: Prodigy, and young adult Zak Kebron from the Star Trek: New Frontier series of novels. According to the novelization, Brikar experience puberty later than humans.	Season 1 (PROD)

== C ==
Race	Home planet	Episodes (M = mention only)
Race	Description	Episodes (M = mention only)
Cardassian	Cardassia Prime, Alpha Quadrant	Introduced in "The Wounded" (TNG); many TNG/DS9/VOY appearances.
Cardassian	Main article: Cardassian The Cardassians are enemies of the United Federation of Planets and are mentioned in Star Trek: Deep Space Nine, Star Trek: The Next Generation, and Star Trek: Voyager. They have noticeable ridges along their foreheads and necks and a crest on their foreheads, earning them the nickname, Spoonheads. Their government is a military dictatorship. Production design: Their makeup design was done by Michael Westmore, and their costumes by Robert Blackman. Major Cardassian characters: Garak, Gul Dukat.	Introduced in "The Wounded" (TNG); many TNG/DS9/VOY appearances.
Chameloid	Unknown	Star Trek VI: The Undiscovered Country, Martia Star Trek: Section 31, Quasi
Chameloid	A race of shapeshifters who can assume any form, the first appearance was in the form of Martia, a prisoner in the Klingon prison colony of Rura Penthe, whom Kirk and McCoy encounter when they are imprisoned there. Prior to this, Kirk stated that he thought Chameloids were merely mythical.	Star Trek VI: The Undiscovered Country, Martia Star Trek: Section 31, Quasi
Changeling	Unknown, Gamma Quadrant	PIC season 3; Odo, Seasons 1–7; Female Changeling, Seasons 3–7 (DS9)
Changeling	A race of fluid shapeshifters, who founded the Dominion by genetically engineering organisms to operate the military and logistics. These organisms refer to most humanoid species as "solids."	PIC season 3; Odo, Seasons 1–7; Female Changeling, Seasons 3–7 (DS9)

== D ==
Race	Home planet	Episodes (M = mention only)
Race	Description	Episodes (M = mention only)
Dar-Sha	Unknown	First appearance: "Kids These Days" (SFA)
Dar-Sha	Dar-Sha are humanoid with ridges on the nose and above the eyes. They first appeared in Star Trek: Starfleet Academy with the main character of Genesis Lythe, portrayed by Bella Shepard.	First appearance: "Kids These Days" (SFA)
Deltan	Delta IV, Alpha Quadrant	Star Trek: The Motion Picture, Ilia Star Trek: Section 31, Melle
Deltan	The Deltans are a humanoid species originating from the Federation planet Delta IV and are outwardly indistinguishable from humans, except that they are bald and wear headdresses. They are known for their strong sexual attraction, which can be distracting to members of other species, leading Deltans to take a vow of chastity upon joining Starfleet.	Star Trek: The Motion Picture, Ilia Star Trek: Section 31, Melle
Dol'drm	Original fifth planet from the sun, solar system	Star Trek: Strange New Worlds season 4, "Valles Marineris"
Dol'drm	The Dol'drm was a species living on a planet where the asteroid belt is today. It was destroyed 65 million years ago when antimatter stolen from the Enterprise was dropped on its surface by Martians.	Star Trek: Strange New Worlds season 4, "Valles Marineris"
Douwd	Unknown	"The Survivors" (TNG)
Douwd	Immortal energy beings with vast powers. Only one is known to exist, choosing to live alone in human form on the planet Delta Rana IV. That one committed xenocide against the Husnock. According to Time Magazine, Captain Picard found the Douwd he met an alien "being of extraordinary power and conscience" and felt they should be left alone.	"The Survivors" (TNG)

== E ==
Race	Home planet	Episodes (M = mention only)
Race	Description	Episodes (M = mention only)
Edosian	Edos	
Edosian	Edosians (aka Edoans) are a race of sentient tripedal beings. Edosians have an orange complexion, two yellow eyes, three arms, and three dog-like legs. Navigator Lieutenant Arex was introduced in Star Trek: The Animated Series, but his planet of origin, Edos, was mentioned only in the background material. Passing references to Edosian flora and fauna have been made in episodes of Star Trek: Deep Space Nine and Star Trek: Enterprise. In some tie-in novels and short stories, Arex is mentioned as a Triexian, with the Edosians being a near-identical race.	
El-Aurian	El-Auria, Delta Quadrant	"Rivals" (DS9)
El-Aurian	El-Aurians (referred to as a Race of Listeners by Dr. Tolian Soran, the El-Aurian antagonist in Star Trek Generations) are a humanoid race first introduced in the second season of Star Trek: The Next Generation with the character Guinan. The species was named in the Star Trek: Deep Space Nine episode "Rivals." El-Aurians appear outwardly identical to humans and have a variety of ethnic types, with both dark- and light-skinned members of the race being shown in various Star Trek movies and television episodes. They can live well over 700 years. They are considered a race of listeners and often appear patient and wise. El-Auria, the El-Aurian homeworld, was located in the Delta Quadrant and was destroyed by the Borg in the mid-23rd century. Few survived, and those who did were scattered throughout the galaxy. Some of the refugees came to the United Federation of Planets.	"Rivals" (DS9)

== F ==
Race	Home planet	Episodes (M = mention only)
Image	Description	Episodes (M = mention only)
Ferengi	Ferenginar, Alpha Quadrant	"The Last Outpost" (TNG) and several later episodes Many (DS9) episodes "False Profits" (VOY) "Mugato, Gumato" (LOW) "Parth Ferengi's Heart Place" (LOW)
Ferengi	Main article: Ferengi At the start of Star Trek: The Next Generation, the Ferengi are considered a mysterious race who care only about profit. They feature as major characters in Deep Space Nine. One of the noted Ferengi is Quark. The race is known for its Rules of Acquisition, sacred precepts that they try to live by.	"The Last Outpost" (TNG) and several later episodes Many (DS9) episodes "False Profits" (VOY) "Mugato, Gumato" (LOW) "Parth Ferengi's Heart Place" (LOW)

== G ==
Race	Home planet	Episodes (M = mention only)
Race	Description	Episodes (M = mention only)
Gorn	Unknown, Beta Quadrant	"Arena" (TOS) "The Time Trap" (TAS) "In a Mirror, Darkly Part 2" (ENT) "Memento Mori" (SNW) "Hegemony" (SNW)
Gorn	Main article: Gorn The Gorn are a violent species who are known for kidnapping large groups of people to serve as incubators for their eggs which they implant inside the body, typically killing the individual when the eggs hatch. Kirk fights with this lizard-like alien in the 1967 "Arena" episode of the original Star Trek series. Several Gorn ships attack the Enterprise while under Captain Pike's command (SNW). In 2017, Den of Geek ranked Gorn the 23rd best alien species of the Star Trek franchise.	"Arena" (TOS) "The Time Trap" (TAS) "In a Mirror, Darkly Part 2" (ENT) "Memento Mori" (SNW) "Hegemony" (SNW)

== H ==
Race	Home planet	Episodes (M = mention only)
Race	Description	Episodes (M = mention only)
Hirogen	Unknown, Delta Quadrant	"Message in a Bottle"(VOY) "Hunters" (VOY) "Prey" (VOY) "The Killing Game" Parts 1 & 2 (VOY) "Tsunkatse" (VOY) "Flesh and Blood" Parts 1 & 2 (VOY)
Hirogen	The Hirogen are a violent Delta quadrant species encountered by the USS Voyager. The Hirogen culture is based around hunting other sentient species, whom they regard as "prey." They are humanoid but larger than humans. Reception In 2017, ScreenRant ranked the Hirogen the 10th most bizarre aliens in the Star Trek franchise up to that time.	"Message in a Bottle"(VOY) "Hunters" (VOY) "Prey" (VOY) "The Killing Game" Parts 1 & 2 (VOY) "Tsunkatse" (VOY) "Flesh and Blood" Parts 1 & 2 (VOY)
Horta	Janus VI, Alpha Quadrant	"The Devil in the Dark" (TOS)
Horta	These are silicon-based life forms that eat rock on the planet Janus VI. The appearance of the only Horta shown in the original series Star Trek episode "The Devil in the Dark," was that of a lump with gray and red all over with no discernable features, looking very much like a giant rock. Every 50,000 years, the entire species die off, except for one mother, who lays thousands of eggs and protects them from danger. In that episode, the creature clashes with a mining colony due to a misunderstanding.	"The Devil in the Dark" (TOS)

== I ==
Race	Home planet	Episodes (M = mention only)
Race	Description	Episodes (M = mention only)
Illyrian	Illyria	"Damage" (ENT) "Ghosts of Illyria" (SNW) "Ad Astra per Aspera" (SNW)
Illyrian	The Illyrians are a species first encountered by the Enterprise NX-01. They are a race that holds genetic augmentation as a tradition, with their species adapting themselves genetically to be able to survive almost anywhere.	"Damage" (ENT) "Ghosts of Illyria" (SNW) "Ad Astra per Aspera" (SNW)

== J ==
Race	Home planet	Episodes (M = mention only)
Race	Description	Episodes (M = mention only)
Jem'Hadar	Unknown, Gamma Quadrant	"The Jem'Hadar" (DS9); Star Trek: Deep Space Nine passim
Jem'Hadar	The Jem'Hadar feature in Star Trek: Deep Space Nine, first introduced in the episode "The Jem'Hadar". They are the shock troops of the powerful Dominion, located in the Gamma Quadrant. Genetically engineered for strength and resolve, they are also short-lived and believe that "victory is life". They are bred to perceive the Founders – enigmatic shape shifters who rule the massive Dominion – as gods and are incapable of harming them. The Jem'Hadar are noted as being able to camouflage themselves with their surroundings and depend upon the drug Ketracel White, a substance made and distributed by the Founders as a means of control; their ships have no chairs, replicators, or medical facilities. The Jem'Hadar's numbers are unknown, but they are produced by the thousands as needed. Conceived as "more than just another fearsome alien", the Deep Space Nine makeup department searched for concepts depicting "toughness and resiliency" in the design of the Jem'Hadar. The final design was based on a rhinoceros, with some added ceratopsian traits. Originally designed on the premise that they were all clones, the first Jem'Hadar seen onscreen were all made to look identical to one another. However, as they became more deeply woven into the storylines, each Jem'Hadar was given a distinctive look. In 2017, ScreenRant ranked the Jem'Hadar as the 8th most bizarre aliens in Star Trek. In 2017, Den of Geek ranked the Jem'Hadar the 11th best aliens of the Star Trek franchise.	"The Jem'Hadar" (DS9); Star Trek: Deep Space Nine passim

== K ==
Race	Home planet	Episodes (M = mention only)
Race	Description	Episodes (M = mention only)
Kazon	Nomadic, Delta Quadrant	"Caretaker" "State of Flux" "Initiations" "Maneuvers" (VOY)
Kazon	Main article: Kazon The Kazon aliens were introduced on Star Trek: Voyager.	"Caretaker" "State of Flux" "Initiations" "Maneuvers" (VOY)
Kelpien	Kaminar	Introduced in "The Vulcan Hello" (DIS)
Kelpien	The Kelpiens lived on the terrestrial planet Kaminar, the world from which Commander Saru hailed in Star Trek: Discovery. The Ba'ul suppressed the Kelpiens for many generations. This race used its technological superiority to feast upon the Kelpien people and prevent them from experiencing Va'Harai and gaining greater consciousness. In S2E7 of Discovery, "Light and Shadows," the Kelpiens, with the help of an energy source associated with the Red Angel, all experienced Va'Harai. They lost their innate fear of the Ba'ul. After that, they plan to live in peace with their former tormentors.	Introduced in "The Vulcan Hello" (DIS)
Khionian	Khionia	Introduced in "Kids These Days" (SFA)
Khionian	The Khionians are a species capable of shifting between a form externally identical to that of a human, and their true form, which is hairless, covered in gray scales, and with black eyes and gray pupils. According to Khionian cadet Darem Reymi, this form has allowed him to withstand pressure differentials of 7,000 pounds per square inch (48,000 kPa) and temperatures as low as −271 °C (−455.80 °F; 2.15 K), letting him survive in the vacuum of space for up to eight minutes. Darem Reymi first appeared in Star Trek: Starfleet Academy.	Introduced in "Kids These Days" (SFA)
Klingon	Kronos, Beta Quadrant	Introduced in "Errand of Mercy" (TOS)
Klingon	Main article: Klingon The Klingons are a warrior race with a strict honor code. Their popularity is strong for a fictional race, and they had a real language written for them that is spoken in the real world, unique among science fiction aliens. Although the Klingons look very human-like in the original series, they underwent a design change for The Next Generation, explained in the show as a massive genetic alteration that added the iconic ridged foreheads.	Introduced in "Errand of Mercy" (TOS)
Kwejian	Kwejian, Alpha/Beta Quadrant	Introduced in "That Hope Is You, Part 1" (DIS)
Kwejian	The Kwejian are a humanoid species native to the planet Kwejian, an empathic people capable of connecting with plants and animals, an ability that manifests as a glowing orange pattern on the forehead when used. They were pre-warp until the 31st century and lived as stewards of their world in harmony with its flora and fauna, venerating a vast planet-spanning tree known as the World Root, from whose sap they crafted heirlooms. The Kwejian survive in a walled, isolationist enclave known as the Sanctuary, hunting their own food and distilling their own liquor. The Burn shifted the orbit of Kwejian's moon and disrupted the planet's tides, causing swarms of sea locusts to devour their harvests; facing starvation, the Kwejian struck a deal with the Emerald Chain, trading trance worms for a repellent to keep the locusts away. The best-known Kwejian is Cleveland Booker ("Book"), born Tareckx, a main character of Star Trek: Discovery from season 3 onward. Book left Kwejian in disgust over his family's dealings with the Emerald Chain and became a courier and conservationist devoted to protecting trance worms, later forming a romantic relationship with Commander Michael Burnham. In 3189, the USS Discovery helped free Kwejian from the crime lord Osyraa's influence, and Book combined his empathic abilities with those of his brother Kyheem, Steward of the Kwejian Sanctuary, to drive the sea locusts back into the ocean. In the Discovery season 4 episode "Kobayashi Maru," Kwejian and its moon were destroyed by gravitational shear from the Dark Matter Anomaly (DMA), killing all life on the surface, including Kyheem and his son Leto; Booker, aboard his ship at the time, was the only known survivor present. In the series finale, "Life, Itself," Booker is given a surviving cutting of Kwejian's World Root, preserved in the Eternal Gallery and Archive, allowing something of the Kwejian way of life to continue.	Introduced in "That Hope Is You, Part 1" (DIS)
Kzinti	Kzin	"The Slaver Weapon" (TAS)
Kzinti	Main article: Kzinti The Kzinti had originally appeared in the Known Space series by Larry Niven and then in the TAS episode "The Slaver Weapon", based on Niven's short story "The Soft Weapon". The cat-like Kzinti had four wars with humanity. According to Sulu, the last one was 200 years before their appearance in the episode. In the Star Trek: Picard episode Nepenthe, Riker says that Kzinti are present on the titular planet.	"The Slaver Weapon" (TAS)

== L ==
Race	Home planet	Episodes (M = mention only)
Race	Description	Episodes (M = mention only)
Lanthanite	Unknown	Introduced in "The Broken Circle" (SNW). "Kids These Days" (SFA)
Lanthanite	The Lanthanites were introduced in the person of Chief Engineer Pelia in the first episode of the second season of Star Trek: Strange New Worlds. Captain Nahla Ake, portrayed by Holly Hunter in Star Trek: Starfleet Academy, is half-Lanthanite. Long-lived, they are noted for having surreptitiously been present, unnoticed, on Earth since at least the Bronze Age, not being discovered by humans until the 22nd century. They serve at Starfleet Academy and in the fleet.	Introduced in "The Broken Circle" (SNW). "Kids These Days" (SFA)

== N ==
Race	Home planet	Episodes (M = mention only)
Race	Description	Episodes (M = mention only)
Nausicaan	Nausicaa, Beta Quadrant	Introduced in "Tapestry" (TNG).
Nausicaan	The Nausicaans are typically portrayed as a brutal and violent people. They are trypically seen as pirates, mercanaries, and bar brawlers.	Introduced in "Tapestry" (TNG).

== O ==
Race	Home planet	Episodes (M = mention only)
Race	Description	Episodes (M = mention only)
Ocampa	Ocampa, Delta Quadrant	
Ocampa	The Ocampa were a humanoid species who lived on the planet Ocampa in the Delta Quadrant. Their early history was shrouded in mystery but their own legends told of a time when they were capable of great mental feats. About five hundred Ocampan generations before 2371, Nacene explorers from another galaxy inadvertently damaged the atmosphere of the planet Ocampa so badly that all nucleogenic particles were lost, thus rendering the atmosphere incapable of producing rain. The planet rapidly became a desert, a time the Ocampans later remembered as "The Warming". The Nacene left two of their kind behind to "honor the debt that could never be repaid" to the Ocampa. The male Nacene, known as the Caretaker to the Ocampa, led the endangered species through tunnels into a vast underground city constructed especially for them. The Caretaker provided them with food, entertainment, water from subterranean sources, and power from the Caretaker's array nearby in space. The Nacene then sealed the Ocampa in, using a force barrier. The Ocampa ruling Elders were subsequently charged with discovering the wishes of the Caretaker, who had become almost a deity to the Ocampan populace. By the late 21st century, the female Nacene, called Suspiria by the Ocampa, had decided to leave her mate to seek out "more interesting places." She established her own array, with a colony of Ocampa. Despite this, Ocampa history had no tales of any of them leaving or being abducted by aliens. Under Suspiria's guidance, these Ocampa colonists developed their mental talents and eventually created technology capable of increasing their natural life spans to as much as twenty years. This made them arrogant to the point that they might look at other humanoids like they looked at pets. All Ocampa appeared to be natural telepaths, able to communicate with members of their species and those of other species, as well. Among the more unusual mental abilities exhibited by the Ocampa were eidetic memory, precognition, telekinesis of varying strength, and the ability to sense and manipulate the subatomic level of matter. Tanis, an Ocampa living on Suspiria's array, demonstrated to Kes that she could control the life force in living things, causing them to grow or die as she wished. Tanis also told Kes that the Ocampa could join Suspiria in a subspace layer called Exosia, which he described as a realm of pure thought. In early 2374, Kes experienced a rapid and uncontrollable blossoming of her mental abilities, possibly due to experiencing intense telepathic contact with the powerfully telepathic Species 8472. Her body and everything around her, including Voyager, began to destabilize at the subatomic level. Kes left the ship and allowed this process to complete itself, apparently evolving into a being of pure energy. She could then move objects through space without need of conventional propulsion, and later exhibited the ability to travel through time. In 2376, an angry and bitter Kes, who returned to her physical form, came back to Voyager and almost destroyed it with her mental powers; only by seeing a recording of herself made before she left Voyager was the timeline changed, Kes calmed down and elected to return to her homeworld.	
Organian	Organia, Alpha Quadrant	"Errand of Mercy" (TOS) "Observer Effect" (ENT)
Organian	The Organians are incorporeal energy creatures ("pure energy, pure thought"). After the climax of the episode "Errand of Mercy", Spock comments that they are "as far above us on the evolutionary scale as we are above the amoeba." They assumed humanoid form to "interact" with the Federation representatives and the Klingons. They render all weapons belonging to the opposing parties inoperable through extreme heat and then vanish. The Organians were a race of beings who had evolved into pure conceptual beings, the essence of thought with no human bodies. In some ways, they were similar to Q for power levels and abilities. In the novel Q Strike, the Organians appear to observe a battle between members of the Q Continuum and other seemingly omnipotent beings from the Star Trek universe. The original Q identifies them after being asked by Captain Jean-Luc Picard who they are and is rather dismissive, remarking that "compared to their code of noninvolvement, your Prime Directive is practically an incitement to riot." The Organians also appeared on Star Trek: Enterprise in the episode "Observer Effect", where they observed members of the crew infected with a silicon-based virus to decide whether or not they should make first contact with humans. They did not technically appear onscreen; they only manifested themselves by possessing the bodies of several members of the Enterprise crew. In 2017, Den of Geek ranked Organians the 20th best aliens of the Star Trek franchise. In 2020, ScreenRant ranked them the 5th smartest aliens of the Star Trek franchise.	"Errand of Mercy" (TOS) "Observer Effect" (ENT)
Orion	Orion, Beta Quadrant	"The Cage"(TC) (TAS) (DS9) (VOY) (DIS) (ENT) (LOW)
Orion	Main article: Orion (Star Trek) Orions are a green-skinned, humanoid alien species in the Star Trek universe. An Orion was first portrayed as an illusion in the original Star Trek pilot. She was seen as well in the broadcast series when this original pilot was incorporated into a two-part episode (episodes 11 and 12) in the first season. Orions are also portrayed in Star Trek: The Animated Series, Star Trek: Deep Space Nine, Star Trek: Voyager, Star Trek: Discovery, Star Trek: Enterprise, Star Trek: Lower Decks, Star Trek: Picard, as well as the 2009 Star Trek film.	"The Cage"(TC) (TAS) (DS9) (VOY) (DIS) (ENT) (LOW)

== P ==
Race	Home planet	Episodes (M = mention only)
Race	Description	Episodes (M = mention only)
Pakled	Pakled Planet	"Samaritan Snare" (TNG) "Brothers" (TNG) M "No Small Parts", "The Spy Humongous", "we Duj" (LOW) "First First Contact" (LOW) M.
Pakled	The Pakled are a species of spacefaring humanoids who obtain technology from other races (rather than developing it themselves), often through trickery. They first appeared in the TNG episode "Samaritan Snare," where the Pakled ship Mondor feigned needing repairs. After Chief Engineer Geordi La Forge was transported to the Mondor and completed repairs, the Pakled captured him and demanded weapons technologies. The Pakled do not appear again but are mentioned in the TNG episode "Brothers" as the Pakleds inadvertently having rescued Data's brother Lore, who was beamed into space at the end of "Datalore". They appeared again in Star Trek: Lower Decks Season 1 episode "No Small Parts" as the antagonists. The Pakleds, having upgraded their ships using scavenged technology from dozens of species, destroy the U.S.S. Solvang, and cause severe damage to the U.S.S. Cerritos, before being chased away by the Cerritos and U.S.S. Titan commanded by Captain William T. Riker.	"Samaritan Snare" (TNG) "Brothers" (TNG) M "No Small Parts", "The Spy Humongous", "we Duj" (LOW) "First First Contact" (LOW) M.

== Q ==
Race	Home planet	Episodes (M = mention only)
Race	Description	Episodes (M = mention only)
Q	Unknown	"Encounter at Farpoint", "Q Who", "Deja Q", "Hide and Q", "Devil's Due", "Qpid", "True Q", "Tapestry", "All Good Things..." (TNG) "Q-Less" (DS9) "Death Wish", "The Q and the Grey", "Q2" (VOY) "Cupid's Errant Arrow" (LOW) M "Veritas" (LOW); Season 2 and "The Last Generation" (PIC) "Wedding Bell Blues" (SNW)
Q	Main article: Q (Star Trek) The Q are immortal, seemingly omnipotent creatures, all named Q. Q is their collective name and the name of their Continuum. One Q is particularly interested in humanity and enjoys repeatedly causing trouble for Captains Picard and Janeway and once for Sisko. The proper Q form is never seen as they claim other races cannot comprehend it. The Q was introduced on Star Trek: The Next Generation, though the character of Trelane in TOS episode "The Squire of Gothos" was shown in Star Trek:Strange New Worlds to be the son of Q.	"Encounter at Farpoint", "Q Who", "Deja Q", "Hide and Q", "Devil's Due", "Qpid", "True Q", "Tapestry", "All Good Things..." (TNG) "Q-Less" (DS9) "Death Wish", "The Q and the Grey", "Q2" (VOY) "Cupid's Errant Arrow" (LOW) M "Veritas" (LOW); Season 2 and "The Last Generation" (PIC) "Wedding Bell Blues" (SNW)

== R ==
Race	Home planet	Episodes (M = mention only)
Race	Description	Episodes (M = mention only)
Romulan	Romulus, Beta Quadrant (historically, Vulcan in the Alpha Quadrant)	"Balance of Terror", "The Enterprise Incident (TOS) "The Deadly Years" (TOS) M Star Trek: Nemesis (PIC)
Romulan	Main article: Romulan Romulans are humanoid extraterrestrials that appear in the Star Trek television series, where members of their race often serve as antagonists. They are a violent, treacherous offshoot of the Vulcans and rule the militaristic Romulan Empire. They prominently feature in the film Star Trek: Nemesis.	"Balance of Terror", "The Enterprise Incident (TOS) "The Deadly Years" (TOS) M Star Trek: Nemesis (PIC)
Reman	Remus, Beta Quadrant	Star Trek: Nemesis "United", "The Aenar" (ENT)
Reman	Remans are a humanoid caste related to the Romulans, forced to live as enslaved under the Romulans and work in the hazardous dilithium mines on Remus. They also prominently feature in Star Trek: Nemesis.	Star Trek: Nemesis "United", "The Aenar" (ENT)

== S ==
Race	Home planet	Episodes (M = mention only)
Race	Description	Episodes (M = mention only)
Son'a	Unknown, The Briar Patch	Star Trek: Insurrection
Son'a	Main article: Star Trek: Insurrection Once members of the neo-luddite race the Ba'ku, the Son'a were exiled from their home planet by their fellows for trying to overthrow the leadership and embracing more advanced technology. Now separated from the rejuvenating properties of the Ba'ku planet, they attempt to avoid death through medical procedures. The Son'a use of certain technology, including isolytic-burst weaponry, was banned within the Federation. Nonetheless, in 2375 the Federation allied with the Son'a to take advantage of their technology to gather rejuvenating 'metaphasic particles' emanating from the rings of the Ba'ku planet, which is in Federation space. After the operation, which involved the forced relocation or genocide of the Ba'ku, was called into question and stopped by the crew of the Enterprise, a number of the Son'a reintegrated into the Ba'ku population. Others later joined the Dominion. The Son'a have subjugated two peoples as their slaves: the Ellora and the Tarlac.	Star Trek: Insurrection
Species 8472	Unknown, Fluidic Space	"Scorpion Part 1 & 2", "Prey", "In the Flesh" (VOY) "Unimatrix Zero Part 2", "Someone to Watch Over Me", "The Omega Directive", "Q2" (VOY) M
Species 8472	Main article: Species 8472 Species 8472 appeared in four episodes of Star Trek: Voyager. While passing through Borg space, Voyager encounters Species 8472, a race that surpasses the Borg in combat prowess.	"Scorpion Part 1 & 2", "Prey", "In the Flesh" (VOY) "Unimatrix Zero Part 2", "Someone to Watch Over Me", "The Omega Directive", "Q2" (VOY) M

== T ==
Race	Home planet	Episodes (M = mention only)
Race	Description	Episodes (M = mention only)
Talaxian	Talax, Delta Quadrant	"Dragon's Teeth", "Jetrel", "Fair Trade", "Homestead", "The Raven", "Investigations", "Basics Part II","Caretaker", "Random Thoughts" (VOY)
Talaxian	On Star Trek: Voyager, the ship's cook Neelix is a Talaxian, first appearing in "Caretaker". In 2017, Den of Geek ranked Talaxians the 21st best aliens of the Star Trek franchise.	"Dragon's Teeth", "Jetrel", "Fair Trade", "Homestead", "The Raven", "Investigations", "Basics Part II","Caretaker", "Random Thoughts" (VOY)
Talosian	Talos IV, Alpha Quadrant	"The Cage", "The Menagerie" (TOS), "If Memory Serves" (DIS)
Talosian	The Talosians were the first race encountered in the Star Trek franchise. They are a race that used to be technologically advanced and warp-capable, but a nuclear holocaust devastated their homeworld. The Talosians are noted for their power of illusions. In 2017, Den of Geek ranked Talosians the 16th best aliens of the Star Trek franchise.	"The Cage", "The Menagerie" (TOS), "If Memory Serves" (DIS)
Tellarite	Tellar Prime, Alpha Quadrant	"Journey to Babel", "Whom Gods Destroy" (TOS), "The Time Trap" (TAS), "Carbon Creek", "Babel One", "Dead Stop", "Civilization", "Bounty", "Borderland", "United", "Terra Prime" (ENT), "Dream Catcher", (PRO) "The Red Angel", "Through the Valley of Shadows" (DIS)
Tellarite	The Tellarites have a facial appearance created by having the actors wearing converted pig masks. Culturally, they are known for their love of arguing and blunt, forceful speech, which most other cultures would consider rude; if Tellarite speech is answered in kind, they will typically consider it an honor. Tellarites appeared rarely in the TNG-era shows, but on Enterprise they are a significant part of several episodes, becoming one of the founding species of the United Federation of Planets. They also appear in Discovery, in which Gorch, a Tellarite Starfleet admiral, is depicted. The animated series Lower Decks depicted a Tellarite captain in the episode "Moist Vessel." In the animated series Prodigy one of the main characters, Jankom Pog, is a 16-year-old Tellarite. In 2017, Den of Geek ranked Tellarites the 25th best aliens of the Star Trek franchise.	"Journey to Babel", "Whom Gods Destroy" (TOS), "The Time Trap" (TAS), "Carbon Creek", "Babel One", "Dead Stop", "Civilization", "Bounty", "Borderland", "United", "Terra Prime" (ENT), "Dream Catcher", (PRO) "The Red Angel", "Through the Valley of Shadows" (DIS)
Tholian	Unknown, Alpha Quadrant	"The Tholian Web" (TOS), In a Mirror, Darkly, " "Future Tense" (ENT)
Tholian	The Tholians are an extremely xenophobic, non-humanoid hermaphroditic species with a propensity for precision. They first appear in the original series episode, "The Tholian Web", where Spock remarks when fired upon by the Tholians: "The renowned Tholian punctuality." Tholian biology required high temperatures around 480 Kelvin (207 °C, 404 °F). They could tolerate lower temperatures for a brief period; if they were exposed to temperatures around 380 Kelvin or less, their carapace would crack. This was painful or distressing; a Tholian subjected to such a temperature regime could be coerced to cooperate. In temperatures even lower, a Tholian would freeze solid and shatter.	"The Tholian Web" (TOS), In a Mirror, Darkly, " "Future Tense" (ENT)
Tribble	Iota Geminorum IV, Beta Quadrant	"The Trouble with Tribbles" (TOS), "More Tribbles, More Troubles" (TAS), "Trials and Tribble-ations" (DS9), "The Breach" (ENT), "Context is for Kings", "Despite Yourself" (DIS), "The Bounty" (PIC), "No Small Parts (LOW)
Tribble	Main article: Tribble Tribbles are a small, harmless species noted primarily for their ability to reproduce extremely quickly; this rapid reproduction creates massive Tribble colonies which can be dangerous to any ecosystem. Though they are normally extremely docile and produce a unique purring sound in the presence of humanoid species that elicits a calming effect, Tribbles produce a shrill shrieking sound in the presence of Klingons.	"The Trouble with Tribbles" (TOS), "More Tribbles, More Troubles" (TAS), "Trials and Tribble-ations" (DS9), "The Breach" (ENT), "Context is for Kings", "Despite Yourself" (DIS), "The Bounty" (PIC), "No Small Parts (LOW)
Trill	Trill, Alpha Quadrant	
Trill	The Trill are a humanoid species. A small minority, after a rigorous selection process, are permitted to join with a sentient, intelligent symbiont. The symbiont is long-lived and can pass from host to host, carrying all the prior host's memories, skills, and experiences. Trill symbionts are also capable of joining with human hosts. The Trill made their debut on television in the Star Trek: The Next Generation episode "The Host" (May 11, 1991) and were further developed in Star Trek: Deep Space Nine. The Trill Jadzia Dax is the 8th host of the symbiont Dax, and together they are one of the main characters of Deep Space Nine for the first six seasons; when Jadzia is killed, Ezri Dax, becomes the next Dax host for the seventh and final season. This species was also briefly represented as a holonovel character corresponding to Ensign Harry Kim on Star Trek: Voyager in "Author, Author" (April 18, 2001). Adira Tal, a human joined with a Trill symbiont, appears in the third season of Star Trek: Discovery. A Trill doctor, Naáshala Kunamadéstifee, appears in Star Trek: Picard, and several Trill also feature in Lower Decks. Trill have been studied in analyzing the biology of Star Trek, especially regarding the symbionts. There are two contrasting concepts for Trill. One is that a symbiont is essentially an alien person; nonetheless, the joined Trill still mixes the original person with the memories and some of the personality of the symbiont. Only a tiny percentage of Trill are joined, and being accepted for the process is considered an honor. For joined Trill, a symbiont's memories, and to some extent personality, are synthesized with the existing Trill's character. Joined Trill have been studied in the philosophies of Star Trek, in particular, whether a person is essentially the sum of their memories (the philosopher Locke's "memory theory"). This concept was explored in the Star Trek: Deep Space Nine television episode "Dax." (see Personal identity § Locke's conception) The contrasting philosophy of the symbiont is called "functionalism," according to Star Trek and Philosophy: The Wrath of Kant, in which people are defined by their actions as opposed to memories. The symbionts have been dismissed as "just memories" rather than an actual person, although in other cases they are described as a "sentient symbiotic organism."	

== V ==
Race	Home planet	Episodes (M = mention only)
Race	Description	Episodes (M = mention only)
Vidiian	Vidiia Prime, Delta Quadrant	"Phage", "Faces", "Lifesigns", "Deadlock", "Resolutions", "Coda", "Think Tank", "Fury" (VOY)
Vidiian	Main article: Vidiians The Vidiians are encountered in the Delta Quadrant by Voyager.	"Phage", "Faces", "Lifesigns", "Deadlock", "Resolutions", "Coda", "Think Tank", "Fury" (VOY)
Vorta	Kurill Prime, Gamma Quadrant	Seasons 2–7 (DS9)
Vorta	Vorta are a member race of the Dominion. One family of then-primitive Vorta once saved one of the Changelings, the rulers of the Dominion. For this, they were genetically engineered into an intelligent species thoroughly loyal to the Changelings and, since then, acted as Dominion administrators, field commanders, scientists, and diplomats. They have direct authority over the Jem'Hadar and are tasked with dispensing doses of Ketracel White to them. In 2017, Den of Geek ranked the Vorta the 15th best aliens of the Star Trek franchise.	Seasons 2–7 (DS9)
Vulcan	Vulcan, Alpha Quadrant	Introduced in "The Cage" (TOS)
Vulcan	Main article: Vulcan (Star Trek) Vulcans are an advanced, brilliant, warp-capable humanoid species from the planet Vulcan. In the past, they were emotional and highly violent until the philosopher Surak convinced most of them to strive to suppress their emotions. War broke out between Surak's followers and those who refused to accept his teachings. Eventually, the latter left Vulcan; one of these factions became the Romulans. While modern Vulcans still feel emotions, they consider it shameful to display or be governed by them. They seek to act by logic alone.	Introduced in "The Cage" (TOS)

== X ==
Race	Home planet	Episodes (M = mention only)
Race	Description	Episodes (M = mention only)
Xindi	Xindus, Delphic Expanse	"The Expanse" (ENT); Season 3 (ENT); Star Trek: Beyond M
Xindi	The Xindi /ˈzɪndi/ is the collective term for six fictional races in the science fiction television series Star Trek: Enterprise. The entire third season, broadcast from 2003 to 2004, centered on this group of previously unknown aliens. They are native to the planet Xindus in a region of space known as the Delphic Expanse. They consist of five species resembling familiar Earth animals (a rarity for alien races in Star Trek) and a sixth resembling humans. At first, they appeared as violent enemies wanting no interaction with humanity. Still, the common ground gradually emerged as the crew of the Enterprise discovered that the Xindi were being manipulated into this hostility by the Sphere Builders. Some Xindi became important recurring characters as the 24-episode story arc unfolded. During the thirteenth live-action film in the series, Star Trek Beyond, the Xindi were mentioned along with the Romulans as aliens that humanity fought wars against in the years leading up to the formation of the Federation. Their defeat and the eventual alliance were the cause behind Edison's mutiny against the Federation, leading him to become the villain Krall. === First appearance === The Xindi's presence was established in the second-season finale of Star Trek: Enterprise, "The Expanse", in which the Xindi launched a probe that attacked Earth in April 2153, killing seven million people in a strip of destruction stretching from Florida to Venezuela. They appeared again in the third-season premiere, "The Xindi," to play a significant role in the primary story arc of season three. === Xindi history === The Xindi are a collective of six intelligent species that evolved simultaneously on the same planet (Xindus). Despite the radically different appearance of all six species, they all share identical ridges on their cheekbones and have very similar DNA. All six of these species were involved in a war lasting about 100 years and ending in the 2030s. Alliances among the Xindi species were forged and changed continuously throughout the war, so much that most Xindi forgot what started it 50–60 years into the fight. Everyone remembered how it ended, however. In desperation, the Insectoids and Reptilians detonated several charges beneath the eight most enormous seismic fissures of the geologically unstable planet Xindus, leading to its destruction and, ultimately, the extinction of the Avian race. After the war, the Xindi scattered throughout the Expanse into several colonies. They are passionate about establishing a new homeworld and unifying all Xindi. Still, they differ significantly on how to accomplish this and who should hold the ultimate reins of power. The Xindi then spent the early part of 2153 deciding how to confront the threat of humanity and planned a biological weapon based on the human genetic profile. This was ultimately rejected by the Xindi Council (the Reptilians went ahead with the bio-weapon but were eventually foiled), so they worked on a weapon to destroy Earth. (Although they technically succeeded, the timeline in which this occurred was undone.) In Star Trek Beyond, Krall, formerly Captain Balthazar Edison, is mentioned to have fought the Xindi and is enraged by the idea of making peace with them and other enemies such as the Romulans. ==== Sphere Builders ==== The Xindi were pawns in the Temporal Cold War, as interference in their history began shortly after the ending of their civil war, with the appearance of a trans-dimensional alien race who guided them to new homelands and resources. The Xindi came to revere these "Guardians," whom they later understood to be the same species as the "Sphere Builders." These aliens were also similarly revered by the Trianon, who believed that deities, which they called "The Makers," constructed the spheres to transform the expanse into a paradise. This led to a devastating religious civil war, as seen in the episode "Chosen Realm." The Xindi were also informed by the Guardians, at least as early as 2152, that they would be victims of a genocidal attack from humans in the 26th century. Following their guidance, the Xindi launched a preemptive test strike on Earth as a precursor to a devastating second attack. In Daniels' timeline, Xindi crewmen serve in the Federation in the 26th century, in a battle with humans and Xindi, against the Sphere Builders. With the help of Captain Archer's evidence of future cooperation, the Xindi Council began to split over the issue of whether the Guardians were the real enemy. The split widened when Reptilian Council Member Dolim killed Primate Council Member Degra. With the help of the Guardians, the Reptilians and Insectoids then took control of the finished Xindi weapon and set on a course for Earth, thus triggering a new civil war. A combined fleet of Arboreals, Primates, and Aquatics pursued the weapon. En route to Earth, a rift appeared in the Reptilian-Insectoid alliance when the Insectoids proposed delaying the destruction of Earth in light of Archer's revelation about the true nature of the Sphere Builders. The Reptilians determined to see the task completed and eliminated the accompanying Insectoid vessel. Arriving near Earth, the Andorian vessel Kumari, commanded by Shran, suddenly destroyed the Reptilian ship, allowing humans to board the Xindi weapon and destroy it. At the same time, Enterprise was able to destroy the entire sphere network, stopping the spatial anomalies. With the Sphere Builder threat ended, the Xindi Council reconvened (the Reptilians were eventually convinced to return), and the Xindi abandoned their belief in the Guardians and their hostile intent toward humans. === Xindi Council === The Xindi Council is the joint governmental body of the Xindi races, as seen in Season three of Star Trek: Enterprise. The Council was formed after the destruction of the Xindi homeworld Xindus in the 2030s. It consisted of two representatives of each Xindi species and was created to find a new homeworld for all the Xindi races. Although they found a few suitable planets, they could never agree on a final choice. The Council chamber is located on a world 15.6 light-years from Azati Prime. The land-based races sit at a large round table in the center of the room, while the Aquatics look on from a large tank adjoining the chamber by a window. The section has built-in equipment for holographic and a viewscreen for telemetry. The room was a stronghold built by the Xindi-Avians before they were wiped out. Circa 2152, the council discovered that humans would destroy them in four hundred years. In a panic, they assigned the Primate scientist, Degra, to construct a weapon to destroy Earth. After several disagreements, the Council was dissolved. To do the Sphere Builders' bidding, the Reptilians and Insectoids broke away from the Primates, Arboreals, and Aquatics. Civil war ultimately broke out when Commander Dolim killed Degra. After Dolim was killed, the Sphere Builders were discredited, the super-weapon destroyed, and the Council reconvened. The names of council representatives as revealed in "The Council" were: Arboreals: Jannar; Aquatics: Kiaphet Amman'sor; Insectoids: unknown (most Xindi Insectoid names are unpronounceable by humans; called "Shrest" in the novelizations); Primates: The Chairman, Degra; Reptilians: regimental commander Dolim; === Other significant Xindi characters === : Kessick – Primate, enslaved on a Trellium-D mine; Thalen – Primate, Degra's assistant; Gralik – Arboreal, chief technician of kemocite facility; === Reception === In 2017, ScreenRant ranked the Xindi the 13th most bizarre aliens in Star Trek. In 2017, Den of Geek ranked Xindi the 14th best aliens of the Star Trek franchise.	"The Expanse" (ENT); Season 3 (ENT); Star Trek: Beyond M

== See also ==
- List of fictional extraterrestrials
