= Geno Silva =

American actor (1948–2020)

- Publicity Photo of Geno Silva
- Born: January 20, 1948; Albuquerque, New Mexico, U.S.
- Died: May 9, 2020 (aged 72); Los Angeles, California, U.S.
- Occupation: Actor
- Years active: 1974–2007

Geno Silva (January 20, 1948 – May 9, 2020) was an American actor, best known for his role as The Skull, Alejandro Sosa's silent hitman in Scarface (1983).

Silva also appeared in films such as 1941 (1979), Tequila Sunrise (1998), The Lost World: Jurassic Park (1997), Amistad, Mulholland Drive, and A Man Apart.

== Early life ==
Geno Silva was born on January 20, 1948, in Albuquerque, New Mexico, to parents Jerry Silva Sr. and Lucille (née Chavez). He grew up in the Barelas neighborhood of Albuquerque with his brother Jerry Jr. and sister Liz.

== Personal life ==
Silva was married to Pamela Phillips. They had one child, a daughter named Lucia.

=== Death ===
On May 9, 2020, Silva died at his home in Los Angeles of complications from frontotemporal degeneration, a form of dementia, which he had lived with for 15 years.

== Filmography ==
=== Film ===
Year	Title	Role	Notes
1974	Thomasine & Bushrod	"Taffy"	
1978	Mean Dog Blues	"Tonto"	
1979	Wanda Nevada	Apache Ghost	
1979	1941	Martinez	
1981	Zoot Suit	Galindo	
1983	Scarface	"The Skull"	
1988	Tequila Sunrise	Mexican Cop	
1989	My Mom's a Werewolf	Dr. Rod Rodriguez	
1991	Night Eyes 2	Luis	
1996	Walker Texas Ranger	"El Coyote"	
1997	The Lost World: Jurassic Park	Carlos, Barge Captain	
1997	Amistad	José Ruiz	
1997	Vanishing Point	Mike Mas	
2001	Mulholland Drive	Hotel Manager / Emcee	
2003	A Man Apart	Memo "Diablo" Lucero	
2005	5 Stages of Grief	Manuel's Father	Short film
2005	Tortilla Heaven	Don Transito	Final film

=== Television ===
Year	Title	Role	Notes
1975	On the Rocks	Joey	
1976	The Quest	Army Scout	
1977	How the West Was Won	Red Hawk	2 episodes
1977	Trouble River	Indian	
1977	McLaren's Riders	Pete Sunfighter	
1977	The Young Pioneers	Fool's Crow	
1978	Ishi: The Last of His Tribe	Elder Uncle	
1979	The Chisholms	Ferocious Storm	2 episodes
1980	Wild Times	Ibran	2 episodes
1982	Bret Maverick	Running Wolf	
1982	Fantasy Island	Claude	
1986	The A-Team	Juan Alvarez	1 episode
1988	Miami Vice	Rojas	1 episode
1988	Police Story: Cop Killer	Lieutenant Hank Ramos	TV Movie
1990	El Diablo	Chak Mol	TV Movie
1991	Days of Our Lives	Domingo Salazar	2 episodes
1993	Key West	Hector Allegria	13 episodes
1996	Walker, Texas Ranger	El Coyote	2 episodes
1996	The Sentinel	Hector Carasco	2 episodes
2005	Star Trek: Enterprise	Senator Vrax	2 episodes
2005	Into the West	Padre Jose San Bernardino Sanchez	1 episode
2007	Cane	Quinones	final acting role
