= Andorian =

Extraterrestrial from Star Trek

Andorians
- Star Trek race
- Commander Shran and crew from the 2004 Star Trek: Enterprise episode "Proving Ground".
- First appearance: "Journey to Babel"; Star Trek: The Original Series; 1967
- Created by: D.C. Fontana

In-universe information
- Quadrant: Beta, Alpha
- Home world: Andoria
- Sub-races: Aenar
- Language: Andorian language
- Affiliation: United Federation of Planets, Andorian Empire

Andorians are a fictional race of humanoid extraterrestrials in the American science fiction franchise Star Trek. They were created by writer D. C. Fontana. Within the Star Trek narrative, they are native to the blue icy Class M moon, Andoria (sometimes referred to as Andor). Distinctive traits of Andorians include their blue/green skin, a pair of cranial antennae, and white hair.

Andorians first appeared in the 1967 Star Trek: The Original Series episode "Journey to Babel", and have been seen or mentioned in episodes of subsequent series in the Star Trek franchise. They were indicated to be a vital, important member of the United Federation of Planets in the 1997 Star Trek: Deep Space Nine episode "In the Cards", but did not gain considerable exposure until the 2001–2005 series Star Trek: Enterprise, on which they were used as recurring characters, most notably in the person of Thy'lek Shran, a starship commander who maintained a sometimes adversarial and begrudging friendship with Enterprise Captain Jonathan Archer. The series revealed more about Andorian ships, the home world Andoria, and the culture and history of Andorians and their subspecies, the Aenar. The 2004 episode "Zero Hour" established that Andorians were one of the four founding members of the United Federation of Planets.

== Development ==
Thelev, an Orion assassin disguised as an Andorian, from the 1967 original series episode "Journey to Babel".

Andorians appeared in four episodes of The Original Series and as background elements in both Star Trek: The Motion Picture and Star Trek IV: The Voyage Home, but remained largely undeveloped until Enterprise. Showrunner Brannon Braga originally wanted to limit the number of original series elements on Enterprise, but came to see the challenge of "tak(ing) the goofiest aliens from The Original Series and make them a real culture that’s cool and believable."

== Appearance ==
Ensign Jennifer Sh'reyan as seen in Lower Decks.

Andorians have blue blood, blue or blue-green skin, white or grey hair, and antennae on the crown of the skull. By the time of the 2001 – 2005 TV series Star Trek: Enterprise, their antennae were depicted as protruding from the forehead. These antennae are capable of intentionally-controlled movement; Andorians use them for gesturing, hearing, and balancing. The design of Andorians has changed with every new production, including the placement of their antennae, additional makeup appliances, and the blue shade of their skin.

== Homeworld ==
Andoria (sometimes referred to as Andor), is an icy moon orbiting a ringed gas giant. In a DVD bonus feature for the 4th season of Enterprise, episode writers Judith and Garfield Reeves-Stevens stated that Andor was the gas giant, Andoria the moon, and that this was a conscious effort to address the discrepancy, but continued varying usage across canon, reference, and licensed sources have not fully resolved the discrepancy.

Most of Andoria's cities are built underground to take advantage of geothermal warmth. Temperatures have been known to reach −28 °C in the summer. Andoria has at least one moon or neighboring planet. Andorians share their homeworld with an obscure telepathic subspecies, Aenar, which have either light blue or white skin.

The non-canonical Star Trek Star Charts (2002) cites Andoria as the seventh planet in orbit around the star Procyon (Alpha Canis Minoris) in the Beta quadrant, but previous material has Andoria as the eighth planet of the orange dwarf Epsilon Indi in the Alpha quadrant. Andoria is near Betazed, Earth, Tellar, and Vulcan.

== Reception ==
In 2017, Den of Geek ranked the Andorians the 9th best aliens of the Star Trek franchise.
