= TrekNation =

Reference and community website for the Star Trek franchise

- Website type: Fan site
- Owner: Christian Höhne Sparborth
- Creator: Christian Höhne Sparborth
- Website: http://www.treknation.com https://trektoday.com/ https://www.trekbbs.com/ https://www.jammersreviews.com/
- Commercial: No
- Registration: Free

TrekNation is a reference and community website for the Star Trek franchise. It also serves as a hub for its network websites: TrekToday, a news site updated nearly daily; The Trek BBS, which describes itself as the largest Star Trek community on the Internet; and Jammer's Reviews, a Star Trek review site.

== TrekNation ==
=== History ===
TrekNation was established on February 5, 1999 by Christian Höhne Sparborth as a network site for Sparborth's sites TrekToday and TrekBBS after he left another network, the TrekZone Network, over disagreements with TrekZone's founder. Other websites included in TrekNation were Jamahl Epsicokhan's review site Star Trek: Hypertext and the now defunct Warp Eleven.

In addition to serving as a network site, TrekNation conducted a number of interviews with past and present Star Trek cast, crew, and contributors; published articles and columns on the Trek franchise; and posted reviews of Deep Space Nine, Voyager and Enterprise. The site also maintained both an episode guide for the various Star Trek series and a now defunct section dedicated to the Wildstorm Star Trek comics.

After the cancellation of Enterprise, the articles and interviews began to slow down. As of 2009, TrekNation's main updates are "Retro Reviews" of the original Star Trek and The Next Generation.

TrekNation and its networked sites have been affiliated with the UGO Network since TrekNation's founding.

=== TrekNation Episode Guide ===
TrekNation still maintains an episode guide for all Trek series (including The Animated Series). Although information on the episodes themselves are not as detailed as that at Memory Alpha, all episode pages for Deep Space Nine, Voyager, and Enterprise contain links to both TrekNation's review of the episode and reviews on other websites. Links are not provided to the Retro Reviews of Star Trek and The Next Generation. Most episodes from all six series also include a parody written by FiveMinute.net.

== Trek BBS ==
=== History ===
The Trek BBS, founded in early 1999, is the largest and most active section of TrekNation, with over 20,000 registered users. Sparborth, the site's founder, was the first head administrator. In June 1999, TrekBBS became part of TrekNation, and was updated with a new layout, known to many posters as "Big Blue". The site also became affiliated with UGO at this time.

In December 2002, Sparborth decided to step down as head administrator, and turned the job over to the administrator Lisa, who had been the de facto head for several months. In September 2004, Lisa resigned as well, and Bonnie Malmat, known on the BBS as T'Bonz, replaced her as head administrator, a position she still holds. In 2005, Malmat was interviewed by the Los Angeles Times on her views of fandom in light of and about TrekBBS's stand on the contentious issues surrounding TrekUnited's "Save Enterprise" campaign. In 2007, the Los Angeles Times again interviewed Malmat for her opinion of fan reaction toward plans for a new Star Trek film by J. J. Abrams and Damon Lindelof.

=== Forums ===
The board includes dedicated forums for all aspects of the Star Trek franchise, including each television series, the movies, novels, games, and fan creations such as fan fiction. Additionally, there are a number of forums for discussion of topics other than Star Trek. These include forums for other science fiction shows such as Doctor Who, as well as forums on less specific topics, including general media, politics, and miscellaneous discussion. The board also has an active social community, which has led to the creation of several spin-off boards.

=== Notable Members ===
Several Star Trek professionals frequent TrekBBS. They include actress Chase Masterson, frequent illustrator Rick Sternbach, graphic designers Michael Okuda and Andrew Probert and Enterprise producers and writers David Goodman and Mike Sussman.

Additionally, many professionals affiliated with Pocket Books post about Star Trek novels, including former editors Margaret Clark, Marco Palmieri and John Ordover. Authors such as Christopher L. Bennett, Margaret Wander Bonanno, Greg Cox, Keith R.A. DeCandido, David R. George III, David Mack, Andy Mangels, Michael A. Martin, Terri Osborne (who was once a moderator on the board), Geoffrey Thorne, David A. McIntee and Dayton Ward also make regular posts at TrekBBS. Because of these visits, several authors have included TrekBBS in their acknowledgements, particularly in Articles of the Federation and The Art of the Impossible, both by Keith R.A. DeCandido, and Ex Machina by Christopher L. Bennett. Additionally, Margaret Wander Bonanno credits TrekBBS and several of its posters (including two former moderators) for reviving her Star Trek writing career on the dedication page of Catalyst of Sorrows.

== TrekToday ==
TrekToday is TrekNation's news site. It went live on February 5, 1999, and has had near-daily updates since then. In addition to posting news about Star Trek, Trek Today posts TrekNation's Retro Reviews and Site Columns, highlighting past Trek news and highly active threads on TrekBBS. The current news editors are Sparborth and Bonnie Malmat. Michelle Erica Green writes the episode reviews.

In early 2001, TrekToday was the first site to post information about the characters for the then-upcoming Enterprise. Sparborth was later interviewed in 2002 about the possible end of the Star Trek franchise.

== Jammer's Reviews ==
Jammer's Reviews, formerly known as Star Trek: Hypertext, is the only TrekNation site not founded by Sparborth. Instead, the site was founded in 1995 by Jamahl Epsicokhan, known on TrekBBS and his site as Jammer. Jammer's site originally focused on reviews of Deep Space Nine, Voyager and Andromeda. Star Trek: Hypertext was part of TrekZone before migrating to TrekNation upon the latter's founding in 1999. In 2000, Jammer was invited by Voyager producer Joe Menosky to pitch a story, although nothing came of it. Also, from September to December 2000, Jammer's Voyager and Andromeda reviews were syndicated by Space.com. This ended in January 2001, when Space.com closed their science-fiction section.

On TrekBBS, Jammer is one of the moderators of the Deep Space Nine forum, a position he has held since the forum's creation. On his website, he has begun reviewing the new Battlestar Galactica and The Next Generation.

== Spin-offs ==
Sparborth owns two other websites which are similar to TrekNation. The first is CSI Files, launched in 2003. It publishes news on CSI: Crime Scene Investigation and its spinoff shows. It also includes a TrekBBS-like forum, TalkCSI. The second site was Get Desperate!, a site for Desperate Housewives news. This site launched in 2005, but is now defunct. Sparborth owned a third site for Andromeda, Slipstream Web, but this site is now defunct. Sparborth also had a German language Star Trek BBS.

== See also ==
- Outpost Gallifrey
- GateWorld
- TheForce.Net
- Memory Alpha
