= Storm Front (Star Trek: Enterprise) =

- Star Trek: Enterprise episodes
- Episode nos.: Season 4 Episodes 1 and 2
- Directed by: Allan Kroeker (Part I); David Straiton (Part II)
- Written by: Manny Coto
- Production codes: 401 and 402
- Original air dates: October 8, 2004; October 15, 2004

Guest appearances
- Golden Brooks – Alicia Travers; Jack Gwaltney – Vosk; John Fleck – Silik; Matt Winston – Temporal Agent Daniels; Christopher Neame – German General; Steven R. Schirripa – Carmine; Mark Elliot Silverberg – Kraul; David Pease – Alien Technician; Burr Middleton – Newsreel Narrator; Joe Maruzzo – Sal; Tom Wright – Ghrath; J. Paul Boehmer – SS Agent; John Harnagel – Joe Prazki

Episode chronology
← Previous "Zero Hour"	Next → "Home"
- Star Trek: Enterprise season 4

"Storm Front" is the title of the first and second episodes of the fourth season of the American science fiction television series Star Trek: Enterprise. They were first broadcast on October 8, and October 15, 2004, respectively, on UPN in the United States. They were written by executive producer Manny Coto, and directed by Allan Kroeker. The episodes resolved the cliffhanger at the end of the third season finale, "Zero Hour". It was Coto's first episodes as the new show runner for the series.

Set in the 22nd century, the series follows the adventures of the first Starfleet starship, Enterprise, registration NX-01. In this episode, after destroying the Xindi weapon, Enterprise finds itself in the 20th century during World War II with Nazis in control of the northeastern USA. Captain Archer (Scott Bakula) joins Silik (John Fleck) to stop the alien Nazis, restore the timeline, and end the Temporal Cold War.

The episodes featured the return of several recurring characters, as well as stunt casting in the form of appearances by actors from other contemporary series – Golden Brooks, Joe Maruzzo and Steve Schirripa. These were the first episodes of the franchise to be shot digitally rather than using film stock, and the filming of the two halves were completed together over 14 days. The first part was seen by 2.89 million viewers, increasing to 3.11 for the second episode. "Storm Front" was poorly received by the critics, with complaints directed at the pace of the episode, the ending of the Temporal Cold War and the general premise itself.

== Plot ==
=== Part I ===
Following the events of "Zero Hour", Commander Charles "Trip" Tucker III (Connor Trinneer) and Ensign Travis Mayweather (Anthony Montgomery) survive the attacks by P-51 Mustangs on their shuttlepod and arrive back on Enterprise. Temporal Agent Daniels (Matt Winston), near death, suddenly appears to Doctor Phlox (John Billingsley) in sickbay. He warns that an alien named Vosk (Jack Gwaltney), the leader of a faction of the Temporal Cold War, has altered the timeline with catastrophic consequences. Enterprise was brought to the mid-20th century to end the Temporal Cold War between several factions including the Federation. On Earth, Captain Jonathan Archer (Scott Bakula) escapes from the Germans when American resistance fighters ambush his convoy.

Wounded, he is taken to a Resistance safehouse in Brooklyn. With the Germans controlling the U.S. Eastern Seaboard, it is revealed that the aliens, known as the Na'kuhl, have sworn allegiance to Nazi Germany. They escaped from Daniels by using "stealth time technology". They are providing the Nazis with advanced weapons and technology in exchange for material and supplies to build a temporal conduit that will take them back to their own time period (since the stealth tech was only one way). Meanwhile, Silik (John Fleck), the leader of the Suliban Cabal, has boarded Enterprise and manages to steal a shuttlepod to fly to Earth. Tucker and Mayweather are then sent to find Silik along with the shuttlepod. Archer contacts Sub-commander T'Pol (Jolene Blalock) using a stolen communicator and is transported back to Enterprise. Before dying, Daniels asks Archer to stop the Na'Kuhl from using the conduit and becoming even more dangerous. On Earth, the landing party find and destroy the shuttlepod, but are captured and taken in for interrogation.

=== Part II ===
Lieutenant Malcolm Reed (Dominic Keating) finds the point of divergence in the timeline: the 1916 murder of Lenin, where witnesses claimed Lenin's killer "vanished into thin air." The removal of Lenin prevents the October Revolution from successfully taking place, causing Hitler to disregard Russia as a threat, and the full weight of the Nazi war machine is then directed at Western Europe and the United States. Vosk seeks an alliance with Enterprise, releasing Mayweather and Tucker in hopes of forging a new understanding with Archer. Medical scans soon reveal that Tucker is actually Silik in disguise and he and Archer realize they need each other's help. They enlist the help of the Resistance to destroy the shields of the Na'kuhl complex and to help rescue Tucker.

Before they can complete the mission, Silik is killed by a guard near the conduit, and Archer is almost shot by a confused Tucker. With the alien shields down, Enterprise then completes an atmospheric entry, flying over New York City and destroying the alien facility with photon torpedoes. The episode ends with Daniels showing Archer the threads of the timeline resetting themselves back to normal, as the Temporal Cold War finally ends with the death of Vosk. Archer demands that Daniels should never visit or bother Enterprise again. With their mission completed, Enterprise finally arrives back in its proper time period, where the ship is escorted home by a mixed fleet of Starfleet, Vulcan, Andorian, and Tellarite vessels.

== Production ==
=== Premise and writing ===
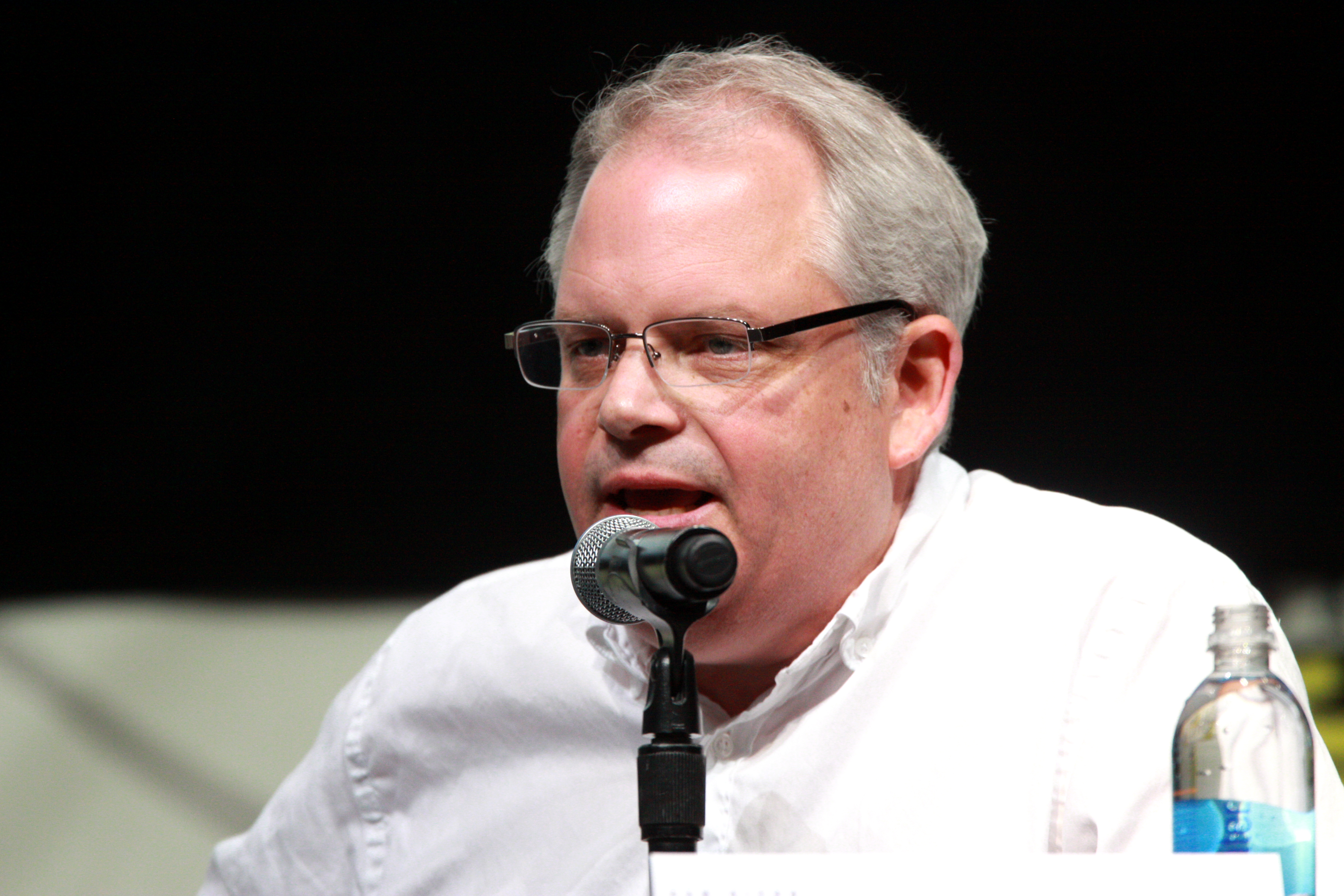
The two part "Storm Front" was the first story for Manny Coto in his new role as Enterprise showrunner.

The decision to introduce a Nazi threat in Enterprise was decided upon when the producers were wrapping up the third season. Executive producer Brannon Braga explained afterwards that "I can't remember who said 'Nazis,' but we just somehow ended up with Nazis. Then that didn't even feel like enough, so we decided to make them alien Nazis." Only one scene featuring the Nazis was filmed during the previous episode, "Zero Hour". The intention was to resolve this quickly at the start of the fourth season and avoid a lengthy storyline.

Further changes occurred prior to the start of the fourth season; executive producers Braga and Rick Berman both took a step back from the show and brought in Manny Coto as the new showrunner for Enterprise. Coto found that after he got through the Nazi story left over from season three, he would have greater freedom to connect the series to Star Trek: The Original Series. He described that cliffhanger as one in which the characters needed to be written out of, as there was no set plan in place on how to resolve it. He made the decision to switch the story from being purely-time travel based to one which featured alternate history, while resolving the Temporal Cold War, and wrote the script for both parts himself.

=== Casting ===
Fleck and Winston resumed their recurring roles on Enterprise in both parts of "Storm Front", as Silik and Daniels. J. Paul Boehmer resumed his role from "Zero Hour" as an SS Agent; he had previously appeared as a Nazi in the Star Trek: Voyager episode "The Killing Game", as well as the Vulcan Mestral in the Enterprise episode "Carbon Creek". Two other actors who returned in "Storm Front" from previous Voyager appearances were Tom Wright, who had appeared as Tuvix in the titular episode, and Christopher Neame, who played Unferth in "Heroes and Demons".

There were also several Star Trek debuts in "Storm Front", including Golden Brooks, better known for her main cast role in UPN's Girlfriends; and Joe Maruzzo and Steve Schirripa, who both appeared in HBO's The Sopranos. These three appearances were described as "stunt casting" by UPN President Dawn Ostroff. Jack Gwaltney was cast as Vosk, the villain of the two-parter.

=== Filming ===
Filming began on July 15, 2004, and was the first time an episode of the Star Trek franchise was shot digitally rather than on traditional film stock. Director of photography Marvin V. Rush later said that it was an easy transition—that it made filming easier, as a high-definition monitor was available on set allowing departments, such as make-up, to make immediate adjustments. Directing Enterprise once again was Allan Kroeker for the first half of "Storm Front", who had helmed the previous episode "Zero Hour". The production of the two parts intermingled over 14 days, with the second half directed by David Straiton. The initial two days of filming took place on the standing sets representing the Enterprise and the shuttlepod. The shoot moved to Stage 9 on the Paramount lot when it resumed after a weekend break, which had been set up to represent the interior of a New York City apartment.

An area of the Paramount backlot was subsequently dressed to appear as exteriors in a Nazi-occupied New York City. This included a reproduction of a boxing poster previously shown in The Original Series episode "The City on the Edge of Forever", as well as a number of references to the production crew. A couple of locations which had appeared before in the franchise were shown, including a street corner shown in the Enterprise episode "Carpenter Street", The Next Generation's "Time's Arrow" and the Voyager episode "11:59". A bus stop from Voyager's "Non Sequitur" was also reused.

Most filming of the episode's second half wasn't done on the standing sets. Scenes were shot elsewhere, including on-site shooting at Griffith Park, which was previously used in the Voyager episode "Future's End". Other locations included the re-dressed Paramount backlot, and an alleyway elsewhere on the site. A night shoot was required for a firefight sequence featuring explosions and stunt work. Additional post-production work was required to show Silik's shapeshifting. In the sequence where Archer and Silik infiltrate the alien compound, Fleck appeared without his usual Silik prosthetics—as, in the story, Silik has used his shape-shifting abilities to resemble a human.

== Reception ==
=== Broadcast ===
The first part of "Storm Front" debuted on October 4, 2004, at a gala evening on the Paramount lot hosted by Kevin Frazier. The screening was followed with a panel discussion featuring Coto, Braga, Kroeker, Rush, Bakula, supervising producer Peter Lauritson, and Sony executives Yasuhiko Mikami and Andrew Stucker. The fourth season of Enterprise was moved to Friday nights on UPN network. The first episode of "Storm Front" was broadcast on October 8, watched by 2.89 million viewers. When the second part was shown the following week, the number of viewers had increased to 3.11 million.

=== Critical reception ===
Charlie McCollum for the Knight Ridder newspapers said that the first half fell flat on promises made to rejuvenate the series, adding that "Storm Front" represented "a confusing premise, flat production and recycled stories." Jamahl Epsicokhan, at his website Jammer's Reviews, gave both parts two and a half out of four stars. He wrote that the episode "inherits so much nonsensical time-travel baggage from previous episodes (including last season's final 60 seconds) that the premise is all but indefensible" and ultimately the episode "breaks down the entire temporal war (at least I think it does) to a single battle in Earth's past, that revolves around a single sci-fi MacGuffin: Vosk's conduit that the Nazis are constructing for him."

Michelle Erica Green of TrekNation, described the first part as "thoroughly entertaining" but was uneasy that the series was producing something so "irrelevant". Green found the episodes were a refreshing change from the Xindi arc in the third season. She said that the second part inherited the same issues from past episodes, but that the opening was strong with the fake newsreel footage of Adolf Hitler arriving in New York City. She didn't like that the Temporal Cold War storyline ended without any clear resolution, and the lack of character moments in the episode.

KJB of IGN gave the first half three out of ten, adding that the first episode suffered from a lack of pace, and described it as "awful". The second episode was rated four out of ten and called "thin on plot", but Coto was praised for killing off "long term pain" Silik, adding that the Suliban were "still the worst aliens ever created for the Trek franchise". KJB closed on a hope that "with some of the conceptual flotsam flushed away, Coto may actually have a chance to give Enterprise a decent final run before its inevitable and grisly end."

Jordan Hoffman writing for Playboy ranked this episode 470th out of 695 Star Trek episodes, and said the Temporal Cold War storyline was worn-out and "this all feels like a step backward." CBR rated "Storm Front" as the seventeenth best multi-part episode of Star Trek. They also ranked this fifteenth of the top twenty time travel themed episodes of all Star Trek series.

== Awards ==
Ronald B. Moore, Dan Curry and David Takemura won the award for Best Visual Effects in a Broadcast Series at the Visual Effects Society Awards in 2004 for their work on the second part of "Storm Front". The other nominees were the pilot episode of Stargate: Atlantis and "Lost City", a two-part episode of Stargate: SG-1.

== Home media release ==
Both parts of "Storm Front" released on home media in the United States on November 1, 2005, as part of the season four DVD box set of Enterprise. The Blu-ray edition was released on April 1, 2014.

== See also ==
- "Patterns of Force" – an episode of the original Star Trek series featuring a society based on Nazi Germany
- Hypothetical Axis victory in World War II
