= Carbon Creek (Star Trek: Enterprise) =

- Star Trek: Enterprise episode
- Episode no.: Season 2 Episode 2
- Directed by: James A. Contner
- Story by: Rick Berman; Brannon Braga; Dan O'Shannon
- Teleplay by: Chris Black
- Production code: 201
- Original air date: September 25, 2002

Guest appearances
- Ann Cusack - Maggie; J. Paul Boehmer - Mestral; Hank Harris - Jack; Michael Krawic - Stron; David Selburg - Vulcan Captain; Clay Wilcox - Billy; Ron Marasco - Vulcan Captain Tellus; Paul Hayes - Businessman

Episode chronology
← Previous "Shockwave (Part II)"	Next → "Minefield"
- Star Trek: Enterprise season 2

"Carbon Creek" is the second episode of the second season of the science fiction television series Star Trek: Enterprise, the 28th episode overall. It first aired on September 25, 2002, on UPN in the United States. Only three of the main cast appear in this episode. It features a flashback story, and T'Pol tells how first contact between humans and Vulcans actually happened far earlier than the date officially celebrated. In 1957 (shortly after the launch of Sputnik) a Vulcan ship crashes in North America and the three surviving Vulcans, including her great-grandmother T'Mir, also played by Jolene Blalock, attempt to live among the local people. It was directed by James A. Contner, his second episode of Enterprise as director. It was filmed partly on location in Crestline, California.

The episode received positive reviews. One review said that it explored themes of acceptance and alienation. The episode was nominated for a Hugo Award.

== Plot ==
Captain Archer, Commander Tucker and Sub-Commander T'Pol are having dinner to celebrate the first anniversary of T'Pol's assignment aboard Enterprise. During conversation, Archer asks why T'Pol traveled to Carbon Creek, Pennsylvania, before she re-joined Enterprise. T'Pol reveals that, contrary to human belief that the first contact between humans and Vulcans occurred in the mid-2060s, (Note: As seen in Star Trek: First Contact) it actually occurred a century earlier. Tucker and Archer react incredulously to this claim, so T'Pol offers to tell them her great-grandmother's story.

T'Mir is a member of a four-Vulcan crew studying Earth from orbit in 1957, when they witness the launch of Sputnik, the planet's first artificial satellite. A mishap with their impulse manifold forces the craft to crash-land in Pennsylvania. The captain is killed and T'Mir, as second-in-command, takes charge. A distress signal is sent, but after more than two weeks no reply is received. From fear of starvation, Mestral and T'Mir enter the nearby town of Carbon Creek, Pennsylvania. Over the next few months, the Vulcans successfully integrate themselves with the townsfolk, renting an apartment from Maggie, a tavern owner.

One day there is a firedamp explosion in the mine; Mestral helps rescue a dozen trapped miners by covertly blasting through a rock wall with a phaser. Eventually, a Vulcan vessel signals that it will arrive to retrieve the crew. Before leaving, T'Mir learns a human lesson in compassion, and travels by train to Pittsburgh where she "sells" the rights to Velcro. The money she receives is more than enough to pay for the college education of their landlady's son. As the Vulcan ship nears, Mestral announces that he intends to stay on Earth and observe the great advances he expects lie ahead. T'Mir reluctantly agrees, and tells the rescuers that Mestral had died along with the captain. T'Pol leaves Archer and Tucker unsure whether or not to believe the story. In her quarters, she reveals she still has T'Mir's handbag.

== Production ==
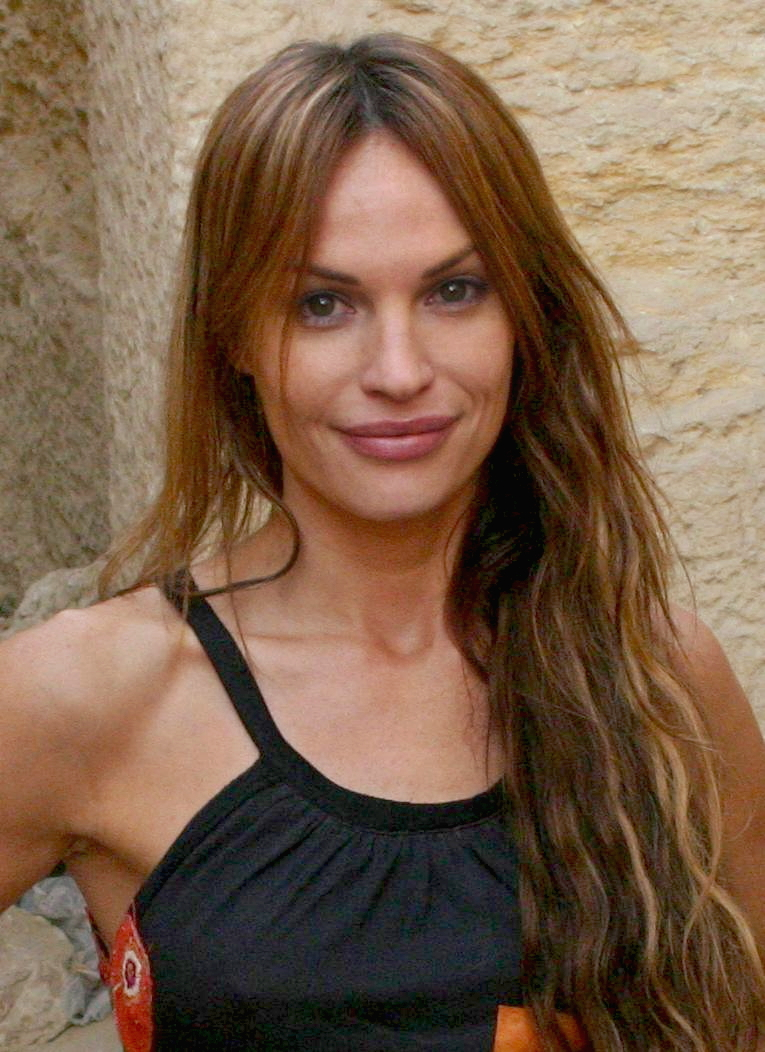
Jolene Blalock portrays both T'pol, and her ancestor T'Mir in this flashback story set in 1950s Pennsylvania

Dan O'Shannon, the executive producer and head writer of Frasier, pitched the idea to Brannon Braga. They were friends and both were working for Paramount. Rick Berman liked the idea, but they decided it "was too off concept to do in the first season", and instead saved it for the second season. Braga said the original series episode "The City on the Edge of Forever" provided some inspiration for the episode. Mestral and T'Mir raided a clothesline for proper period apparel, and Mestral wore a wool cap to cover his ears (as Spock did). The Vulcans get menial jobs, much as James T. Kirk and Spock got jobs as labourers during their adventure. Mestral and T'Mir are both seen sweeping floors, as Spock did. Also, a Vulcan is shown working on an electronics project in a kitchen.

Jolene Blalock played the Vulcan commander T'Mir. This continues a tradition of casting Star Trek actors to portray their character's ancestors. Blalock said getting to play her own grandmother was something different and that she liked the episode. J. Paul Boehmer played Mestral, the character was named after George de Mestral, the inventor of Velcro. Boehmer said that as an actor it was fun for him to interpret "the wonderful archetype that Leonard Nimoy was able to create" and that he was a "total geek" for the original series. Boehmer had previously appeared in Star Trek as a Cardassian, a Borg Drone, and a Nazi. He later returned to Enterprise portraying a Nazi, in the episode "Storm Front". Michael Crawic, who played Stron, previously appeared as a guest star on Deep Space Nine and Voyager. David Selburg makes his fourth appearance on Star Trek and played the Vulcan captain.

Although "Carbon Creek" was aired as the second episode of the season, it was the first to be filmed. It was the second episode directed by James A. Contner, who had previously directed the episode "Dear Doctor". Production began on Wednesday, 26 June 2002, with two days of location shooting. On Friday, they returned to Paramount Studios lot, and began shooting on sets depicting the fictional mining town, as well as the bridge of a Vulcan ship. Bakula and Trinneer reported to work on Monday, July 8, to shoot scenes on the standing Enterprise sets. On Friday July 19, some additional exterior pickup shots were filmed. Further pickup shots occurred during the filming of the fourth episode. "Carbon Creek" exterior locations were filmed in the Valley of Enchantment, which is located in Crestline, California, near San Bernardino. The filming locations were State Highway 138 and Waters Drive. The small grocery store, Johnnie's Market, was the actual small town market there. The fictional town of Carbon Creek, Pennsylvania, was shown during the episode to be on Pennsylvania Route 138, which would place it somewhere in Butler County, Pennsylvania, about 40 miles north of downtown Pittsburgh. While Carbon Creek is fictional, there is a Carbon County, Pennsylvania located about 60 miles northwest of Doylestown.

An alternate take of one of the captain's mess scenes was filmed, with the actors (including Jolene Blalock) acting as though they were intoxicated. The scene was played straight in the broadcast version, while the "drunk take" was included on the Season 2 DVD release, as part of the season's blooper reel, due to actor Connor Trinneer breaking character at the end of the take.

Author Homer Hickam saw the episode and wrote: "I have little doubt that the writers were inspired by my book Rocket Boys and its film adaptation October Sky", and "imitation is the sincerest form of flattery, so I'm pleased by the show". Scenic art supervisor Michael Okuda responded and said he didn't know if the references were intentional or not but that he noticed the echoes too. Okuda deliberately added his own references, including a window sign for "Big Creek Manufacturing & Sales" at the company where T'Mir goes to sell her invention.

The Vulcan uniform worn by Mestral, including a brown leather jacket, was sold at the "It's a Wrap!" auctions.

== Continuity ==
- T'Mir's sale of the patent rights to Velcro is analogous to Montgomery Scott's sale of the patent rights to transparent aluminum in Star Trek IV: The Voyage Home.
- This was one of several episodes to feature a minor running joke involving T'Pol's age. At the end of the third season, in the episode "Zero Hour", she admits to Trip that on her next birthday she will be 66 years old.
- In the beginning of the episode, Trip makes an off-hand remark about there being a statue at the site of First Contact between humans and Vulcans, a reference to Star Trek: First Contact, in which several characters (including the statue's then-future model) discuss the future statue at the site.
- Stron, because of his haircut, has to endure being compared endlessly to Moe Howard of the Three Stooges. Mestral enjoys the simpler pleasures of human life such as baseball games and watching I Love Lucy on TV. Desilu Productions, the show's production house, also produced Star Trek: The Original Series.
- The question of how the Vulcans manage to understand and be understood by humans in this episode without the use of universal translators and without learning English is not addressed. A core concept of the show was that Hoshi Sato was brought along to learn and translate alien languages because universal translators had not been invented yet, and multiple Season 1 episodes including Broken Bow and Fallen Hero refer to Vulcans needing to learn English.

== Background ==
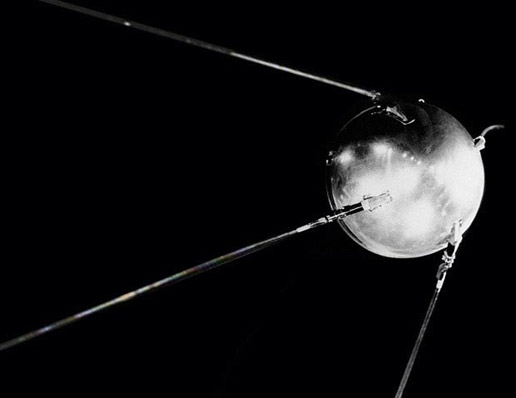
The episode is set in 1957, when the first man made satellite Sputnik was launched.

- Coincidentally, the same month as the episode was being filmed there was a real coal mine accident at Quecreek, Pennsylvania, where nine miners were trapped underground for three days. All were rescued.
- Early in the episode, Trip remarks that T'Pol's story is like "an old episode of The Twilight Zone." The night this episode originally aired, a new version of The Twilight Zone debuted on UPN, from executive producer Ira Steven Behr.
- The episode contains a fictionalized account on the origins of Velcro. In reality, Velcro was invented in 1951 by Swiss engineer George de Mestral, after whom the character Mestral in this episode is named.

== Reception ==
"Carbon Creek" first aired September 25, 2002, on UPN. According to Nielsen, it was rated 2.4%, and had an audience share of seven. This means it was watched by 4.84 million viewers. This was up slightly from the previous week, but down significantly from the first season. Among first run science fiction or fantasy genre shows that week, Enterprise came in seventh place. By comparison, in first place with 11.3 million viewers was the season two premiere of Alias, a spy series starring Jennifer Garner, broadcast on ABC.

IGN gave the episode seven out of ten, a "Good" rating, saying "it's better than the ads made it seem", and were thankful that it did not have anything to do with time travel. They were positive about the nostalgia and the "fish out of water" moments, and enjoyed the episode even though they found it predictable. Michelle Eric Green of TrekNation, compared it to the film October Sky and the Deep Space Nine episode "Little Green Men", calling it "a derivative but fairly delightful episode". Green said the episode is worthwhile just for Mestral, who combines enthusiasm and open-mindedness with Spock-like deadpan humor. She praised the episode for getting the right balance of humor and drama, well-crafted performances and fun visuals. Julia Houston, writing for About.com, criticized the lack of originality or consequences: "it's not a funny romp, nor a revealing glimpse into anyone's background. No one we care about learns anything, and we learn nothing about them. Here's hoping for better episodes in future." James Gray of The Digital Fix compared it to the Star Trek: Voyager episode "11:59". He concludes that "Carbon Creek" sums up the whole season as "nice to look at, well made and acted, an immaculately pristine forty-five minutes of television that is nevertheless a complete waste of time, having no purpose or point other than to fill in a slot on the schedule." Television Without Pity gave the episode a grade of B−. In his 2022 rewatch, Keith DeCandido of Tor.com gave it seven out of ten. DeCandido found it more effective than "11:59", but was bothered by some of the anachronisms and inaccuracies, saying "it's a fun episode. Just wish they’d done more than a modicum of research…".

In 2009, Den of Geek ranked "Carbon Creek" as the second best episode of Enterprise. The episode was praised as giving the characters warmth and familiarity, while overflowing with what it calls "dry Vulcan humor". In 2017, Den of Geek included "Carbon Creek" on their list of the 50 Best Episodes of Star Trek. In 2011, Tor.com recommended "Carbon Creek" as one of six great episodes of Enterprise, saying "this second season episode is really a standout, if only because it's just so charming." TechRepublic included the episode on its list of the 5 best episodes of Enterprise. In 2014, The A.V. Club gave the episode an honorable mention in their list of recommended Enterprise television episodes. In 2015, "Carbon Creek" was included in Geek.com's 35 greatest moments in Star Trek. In 2016, TrekNews.net ranked "Carbon Creek" fourth in their list of the top ten essential episodes of Enterprise. They said it was "just good, wacky fun" watching Vulcans try to adapt and blend in and watch I Love Lucy. A 2016 binge guide by Wired recommends this episode, saying it was one not to miss, that "Blalock acquits herself admirably," and that it is "the culture clash hijinks" that we all want to see. In 2021, The Digital Fix said this episode was one of the highlights from season two, and said it was charming to see the Vulcans adapt to life on Earth.

=== Awards ===
"Carbon Creek" was nominated for a Hugo Award in the category Best Dramatic Presentation, Short Form. The episode "A Night in Sickbay" was also nominated. The award was won by Buffy the Vampire Slayer for "Conversations with Dead People".

== Home media releases ==
The first home media release of "Carbon Creek" was part of the season two DVD box set, released in the United States on July 26, 2005. A release on Blu-ray Disc for season two occurred on August 20, 2013.

== See also ==
The 1987 Star Trek novel Strangers from the Sky shares the basic concept as this episode, in that Vulcans accidentally land on Earth years before the official "First Contact".
