= Shockwave (Star Trek: Enterprise) =

- Star Trek: Enterprise episodes
- Episode nos.: Season 1 and 2 Episodes 26 and 1
- Directed by: Allan Kroeker
- Written by: Rick Berman; Brannon Braga
- Production codes: 126 and 128
- Original air dates: May 22, 2002; September 18, 2002

Guest appearances
- John Fleck - Silik; Matt Winston - Temporal Agent Daniels; Vaughn Armstrong - Admiral Forrest; James Horan - Humanoid Figure (Part I); Stephanie Erb - Receptionist (Part I); David Lewis Hays - Tactical Crewman (Part I); Gary Graham - Ambassador Soval (Part II); Keith Allan - Suliban Commander Raan (Part II); Jim Fitzpatrick - Commander Williams (Part II); Michael Kosik - Suliban Soldier (Part II)

Episode chronology
| ← Previous "Two Days and Two Nights" | Next → "Carbon Creek" |
- Star Trek: Enterprise season 1

"Shockwave" is a two-part episode of the television series Star Trek: Enterprise. Part one is the first-season finale, the twenty-sixth episode (production #126), and part two is the second season opener, the twenty-seventh episode (production #128). Because of this, common to the Star Trek franchise in this period, part one aired on UPN on May 22, 2002, with a cliffhanger ending, but it was nearly four months before the second part aired on UPN on September 18, 2002.

Set in the 22nd century of the Star Trek science fiction universe, Captain Archer of the Enterprise deals with a shuttlecraft incident on an alien planet.

== Plot ==
=== Part I ===
While visiting an alien mining colony on Paraagan II, a shuttle accidentally sets fire to the large amounts of tetrazine in the atmosphere, instantly incinerating the 3,600 colonists on the surface. Despite Lieutenant Reed's precautions, Captain Archer personally puts full blame on himself for all the deaths caused. He doesn't argue with Starfleet's Admiral Forrest when Enterprise's mission is officially cancelled, and the ship is ordered to return home (on the advice of Vulcan Ambassador Soval).

Later, Archer is suddenly transported back ten months in the past. He then encounters Crewman Daniels who warns him that the Suliban are trying to sabotage Enterprise's mission. He wants to help Archer discover the truth, because events must go on to preserve the timeline. Using information from Daniels, Reed finds a cloaked Suliban device on the shuttlepod's engine manifold, and Archer directs Commander Tucker to build advanced quantum beacon detectors. Enterprise then travels back to an asteroid field near Paraagan II where a Suliban ship is hiding. They quickly cripple and board the ship, finding computer memory chips with proof of the Suliban's plan.

As Enterprise makes its escape, they are able to prove that the explosion wasn't their fault. Sub-Commander T'Pol is still skeptical about the time travel explanation, as Vulcan scientists believe time travel is impossible. Later the ship starts experiencing warp field problems, and soon detects 20 or 30 Suliban cell ships in pursuit. The ships decloak, and Silik orders Archer to surrender himself. Archer puts T'Pol in command, but he never makes it to the Suliban shuttle, as he is time transported again, this time to a derelict 31st century building overlooking a devastated cityscape. Daniels appears behind him telling him that bringing him into the future to protect him caused this dramatic change in the timeline. Archer asks to be sent back to repair the damage, but since all the time travel equipment is gone, they are both trapped.

=== Part II ===
With Archer gone, T'Pol chooses to surrender the ship to the Suliban to let them verify his disappearance. They do not find any trace of Archer, but they retrieve their data disks and detect a temporal signature in the turbolift. Meanwhile, in the 31st century, Daniels realizes that there is no available technology to send Archer back and, because of this, the timeline has been disrupted. Archer gives Daniels his communicator and scanner, allowing Daniels to make a device able to contact Enterprise.

The Suliban take Enterprise to a nearby helix, and Silik interrogates T'Pol to learn where Archer has gone, but she knows little. When T'Pol is returned to her quarters, Archer contacts her and gives her instructions on how to bring him back. Meanwhile, Tucker is able to set up a communication link between the senior staff, and they plan an escape. The plan begins when two Suliban find T'Pol acting strangely, and are knocked out by Reed and Ensign Mayweather. Reed then goes to Daniels's quarters to retrieve a futuristic device, but is caught by the Suliban. During interrogation, he tells Silik that Archer gave him orders to destroy the device, to prevent him from using it to get in touch with the Suliban's contact from the future.

Silik then tries to contact his master but he only succeeds in bringing Archer back, Daniels and Archer having managed to set up a device that allows them to return Archer to his time using the communication device as a 'target'. Meanwhile, on Enterprise, a faked warp core breach is initiated, forcing the Suliban to evacuate the ship. As soon as they are freed, Enterprise goes to warp, pursued by Suliban ships. Archer destroys Daniels's device and, having taken Silik hostage, secures their escape. The reunited crew finally present their proof to Starfleet Command and the Vulcans. Soval still recommends cancellation of the mission, but Archer promises that humanity will learn from their mistakes. T'Pol supports him, adding that the Vulcans should learn from their mistakes as well. Soval exits, and it is decided that Enterprise's mission will continue for now.

== Production ==
Producer Rick Berman was proud of how the cliffhanger episode turned out, "I think it will blow people away." Brannon Braga was also pleased how the episode turned out, and said the episode speaks to the entire season that came before it, because for the first time T'Pol stands with Archer instead of fighting against him, and they work together to vindicate Enterprise and continue their mission despite both Starfleet and the Vulcan High Command having decided the mission was a failure.

Berman explained that they normally wait until after the summer break before they figure out how to resolve the cliffhanger, but this time after the show wrapped, he and Braga spent an extra week coming up with ideas for the first three episodes of season 2.

Although Part 2 of "Shockwave" was the first episode of season two it was the second episode produced, as "Carbon Creek" was filmed first, as it only required three principal cast members. Filming began on Wednesday, July 10, was shot entirely on three soundstages at Paramount, and wrapped the following Thursday.

== Ratings ==
"Shockwave: Part 1" was first aired in the United States on UPN on May 22, 2002. According to Nielsen Media Research, it received a 3.3/6 rating share among adults. It had an average of 5.3 million viewers.

"Shockwave: Part 2" was first aired in the United States on UPN on September 18, 2002. According to Nielsen Media Research, it received a 3.2/5 rating share among adults. It had an average of 4.9 million viewers.

== Reception ==
Daryl H Miller of the Los Angeles Times calls the first season of the show a success, but notes that it and this episode "repeats an awful lot of the original show's formula". Aint It Cool News gave Part 1 a rating of four out of five. IGN gave "Shockwave Pt. II" three out of five stars, and was positive about the unrealized potential of the show, but was critical of the ongoing attempts to distract from flaws with visual gags such as Hoshi losing her shirt. Kathie Huddleston of SciFi.com (SyFy) gave "Part 2" a grade B−, and wrote: "Unfortunately, as is too often the case with cliffhangers (and especially Star Trek cliffhangers), the setup is much better than the resolution." She also felt that the episode was rushed and the situation too easily solved. Leo Walsh of Cinescape gave the "Part 1" a grade B, and called the cliffhanger "reasonably compelling" but warned "the proof of a cliffhanger is in the execution of part two". Walsh gave "Part 2" a grade B−, and says it wraps up the "cliffhanger in the least troublesome manner possible", and while there is action and character development, it fails to address the epic questions brought up by "Part 1". Jammer's Reviews rated Shockwave, "Part I" with four out four stars, and "Part II", two out of four stars.

In 2021, Baz Greenland of The Digital Fix said "Shockwave: Part I" was a strong ending to season one, saying it was a "terrific cliffhanger. He felt that "Part II" was not as good, saying "It should be thrilling, but it lacks the tension and excitement of the season one finale". In his 2022 rewatch, Keith DeCandido of Tor.com gave four out of ten to Part 1. He gave Part 2 a rating of five out of ten, saying is actually better than Part 1, because it tells "a straight-up action storyline that has our heroes being competent."

== Music ==
Jay Chattaway's music for the episode was released as part of the four disc Star Trek: Enterprise Collection on December 2, 2014, including many pieces from the episode(s).

Part I:
| 1-2 | Disaster | 0:54 |
| 1-3 | Eulogy | 1:41 |
| 1-4 | Daniels Arrives | 3:00 |
| 1-5 | Hide And Seek | 3:32 |
| 1-6 | No Return | 3:37 |

Part II:
| 1-7 | A Refresher | 1:41 |
| 1-8 | Playing Possum | 2:14 |
| 1-9 | The Captain | 2:23 |
| 1-10 | Onward | 0:19 |

== Home media release ==
"Shockwave: Part I" was released as part of Enterprise season one, which was released in high definition on Blu-ray disc on March 26, 2013; the set has 1080p video and a DTS-HD Master Audio sound track.
