= Acquisition (Star Trek: Enterprise) =

- Star Trek: Enterprise episode
- Episode no.: Season 1 Episode 19
- Directed by: James Whitmore, Jr.
- Story by: Rick Berman; Brannon Braga
- Teleplay by: Maria Jacquemetton; Andre Jacquemetton
- Production code: (40358-019) 119
- Original air date: March 27, 2002

Guest appearances
- Jeffrey Combs - Krem; Ethan Phillips - Ulis; Clint Howard - Muk; Matt Malloy - Grish

Episode chronology
← Previous "Rogue Planet"	Next → "Oasis"
- Star Trek: Enterprise season 1

"Acquisition" is the nineteenth episode (production #119) of the first season of the American science fiction television series Star Trek: Enterprise that originally aired on March 27, 2002, on UPN. The episode was developed into a teleplay by Maria and Andre Jacquemetton from a story by Rick Berman and Brannon Braga, and was directed by James Whitmore, Jr. Set in the 22nd century, the series follows the adventures of the first Starfleet starship, Enterprise, registration NX-01. In this episode, a group of interstellar alien thieves knock out the Enterprise crew and begin looting the ship. Commander Charles "Trip" Tucker III (Connor Trinneer) is the only one left to stop them.

The Ferengi first appeared in the Star Trek: The Next Generation episode "The Last Outpost", and first contact with the race was described in "The Battle". In addition, a Ferengi language was developed by the writers which was based on French. The episode also had a number of guest stars who had previously appeared in Star Trek; Clint Howard, Ethan Phillips and Jeffrey Combs. It was poorly received by critics, but according to the Nielsen ratings, it received a 5.2/6% audience share during broadcast.

== Plot ==
As Enterprise drifts in space, the crew is unconscious. An alien cruiser scans the ship, then docks with it. Two Ferengi, Muk and Grish, board wearing breathing filters. They deactivate a gas-emitting device that the Starfleet crew brought up from the surface of a nearby moon. Unknown to the intruders, Commander Tucker is still conscious and makes his way to Engineering and uses the ship's sensors to monitor the aliens as they plunder the ship.

The Ferengi awaken Captain Archer and demand to know where he keeps his valuables. The Captain refuses to help and tells the Ferengi they have no money or latinum on board, so he is confined to a cargo bay. The aliens are unconvinced that Enterprise carries no valuable materials. They set off to find the vault themselves, leaving Krem and Archer to transfer the loot. Archer sees Tucker and sends him to the launch-bay to retrieve the Ferengi's hypospray. Doing so, Tucker revives Sub-Commander T'Pol. She deduces that the gas device was intentionally left as a 'Trojan Horse'. In Sickbay, three of the four Ferengi search for the non-existent vault, and T'Pol uses a PADD to distract and then start an argument between them.

In Engineering, Archer tries to negotiate with Krem, who is tempted when Archer says that he will throw in T'Pol. Muk goes to the launch-bay and finds Tucker, who escapes, but Ulis subdues him with his electro-whip. The Ferengi, Archer and Trip meet in the launch-bay where Archer plays along with Tucker's deception about "the vault". T'Pol assists in subduing the intruders, and the crew oversee the return of the stolen goods. Archer tells the Ferengi not to go within a light year of a human or Vulcan vessel ever again (and they indeed do not reappear until some 200 years later in the episode The Last Outpost).

== Production ==
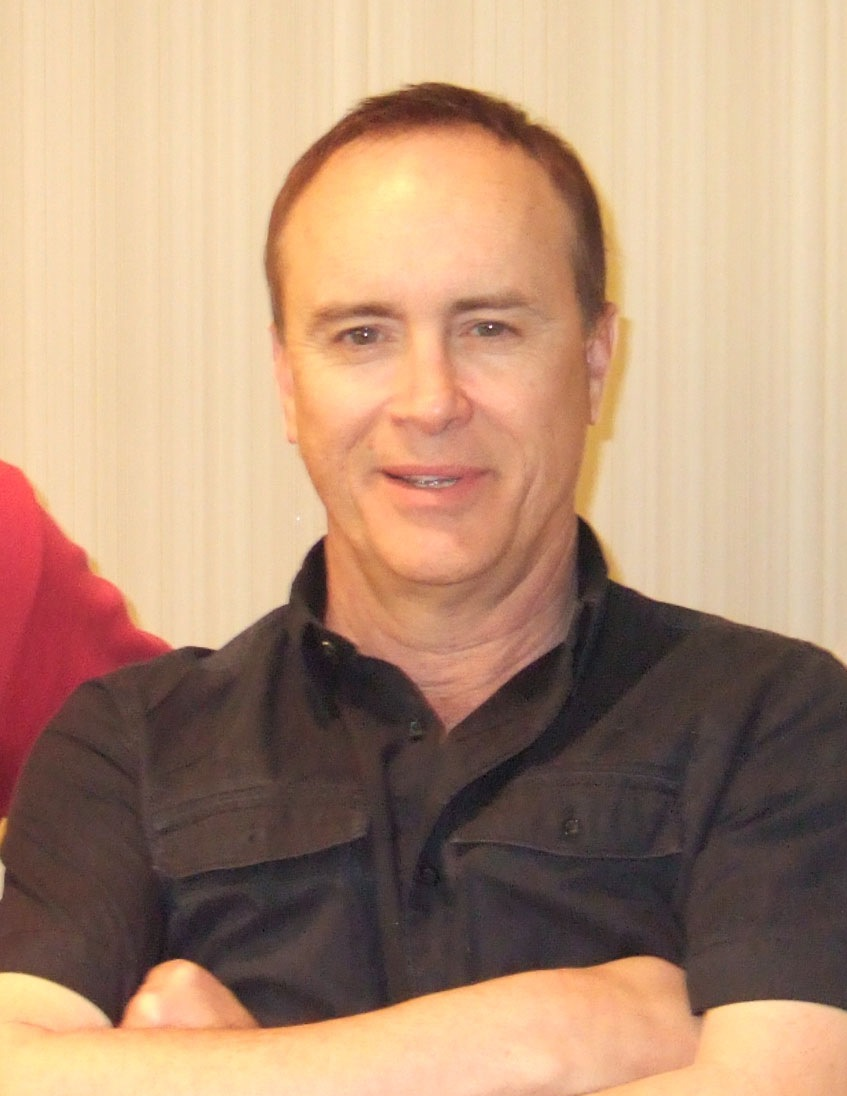
Jeffrey Combs had already appeared as Shran in Enterprise when he guest starred in "Acquisition" as a Ferengi.

The writers of "Acquisition", Maria and Andre Jacquemetton, developed a spoken language for the alien race known as the Ferengi. Although they had been seen before on screen in previous incarnations of Star Trek, including throughout Star Trek: Deep Space Nine, a spoken language had not been developed. The pair wrote the dialogue initially in English, before translating it into French and then breaking it down into syllables. They described it as "fun to write". The pair had intended for the Ferengi throughout the episode to speak their new language, but this was reduced to only the first act. This was the third episode written by the duo, after "Breaking the Ice" and "Dear Doctor".

Story editor André Bormanis explained in a web chat, just before the airing of the episode, that they had sought to ensure that Jean-Luc Picard was the captain who made first contact with the Ferengi officially; Bormanis commented that he thought the episode was funny. The Ferengi made their first appearance in the Star Trek: The Next Generation episode "The Last Outpost", having been developed by franchise creator Gene Roddenberry and producer Herbert Wright. The events of the episode "The Battle" established that it was Picard on board the USS Stargazer at the Battle of Maxia that made the official first contact with the race on behalf of the Federation. Mike Sussman said it was "one of the more controversial choices, but I think we structured the show in a way that preserves Picard's first contact with them". He also joked that (chronologically) first contact with the Ferengi really occurred at Roswell in 1947 (in the Deep Space Nine episode "Little Green Men").

Director James Whitmore, Jr. had directed episodes of 24, Buffy the Vampire Slayer, Roswell, The X-Files and many other shows. He occasionally acts in the episodes he directs, and he appeared in several episodes of Quantum Leap starring Scott Bakula, of which he directed 15 episodes. Whitmore also directed the season 2 episode "Future Tense".

The guest cast featured three former Star Trek alumni including Clint Howard who had appeared in the original Star Trek episode "The Corbomite Maneuver" as Balok. Ethan Phillips had appeared as Neelix, a main cast character in Star Trek: Voyager, as well as the Ferengi doctor Farek in The Next Generation episode "Ménage à Troi". The third alumnus was Jeffrey Combs who had appeared as several characters such as Weyoun and the Ferengi Brunt in Star Trek: Deep Space Nine. Combs had already appeared in Enterprise as the Andorian Shran, and would continue to do so for the rest of the series. He said that being asked to appear as a Ferengi once again took him by surprise, but that Krem was "a world's away" from the Brunt character, which pleased him.

== Reception ==
"Acquisition" originally aired on UPN on March 27, 2002. According to Nielsen ratings, it received a 5.2/6% share, meaning that it was seen by 5.2 percent of all households, and 6 percent of all households watching television at the time of the broadcast. It had an average of 5.45 million viewers.

Herc, in his review for Ain't It Cool News, compared to the Die Hard inspired episode of Alias entitled "The Box". He thought that the Enterprise episode wasn't as good and suggested it might have been a filler episode. He gave it a rating of 2.5 out of five, saying "one continues to get the impression that the Trek writers find the Ferengi a lot funnier than the audience does." Alasdair Wilkins, at The A.V. Club described the episode as "Star Trek comfort food", but also that it demonstrated "a show unable to carve out its own identity, content to rehash old stories when the show's very premise demands new storytelling" but concedes that "what the episode loses in originality it does somewhat regain in execution". Chaz Lipp at The Morton Report called "Acquisition" a "goofy" episode, and one of several which were "weak and uninspired". In his 2022 rewatch, Keith DeCandido of Tor.com gave it one out of ten, and wrote: "To call this episode a trash fire is being incredibly mean and unfair to hot flaming garbage." He said that the episode, in common with other bad Ferengi episodes, fails to take the concept seriously and instead goes for "what will get the most cheap laughs rather than what will make a good story". Furthermore, while acknowledging that Star Trek would break continuity and that it was worth it for the right story, he did not think it was justified for a dumb comedy episode. One of the few things he liked about the episode was the "nuanced" performance of Combs as Krem, calling it better than the episode deserved. In his Season 1 overview, he reiterated that the low rating, joint lowest with "Dear Doctor", was "well-deserved".

In 2014, The A.V. Club noted this as one of the top ten representative episodes of this series. They noted how the show struggled to harness the existing canon, yet also stay within supposed limitations of a prequel, which was represented in the episode. For example, at this time the Federation was not supposed to have any knowledge of the Ferengi, but they still made an episode with them and got around this issue by having the NX-01 crew never discover who these aliens were. Despite this, they found the episode "fun to watch" praising the humour and acting of the episode.

== Home media release ==
The first home media release of the episode was on VHS in the UK on September 23, 2002. It was first released in the United States on DVD, having been released as part of the season one box set during May 2005. The Blu-ray release of Enterprise was released in the United States on March 26 with the UK release following on April 1.
