= Carpenter Street (Star Trek: Enterprise) =

- Star Trek: Enterprise episode
- Episode no.: Season 3 Episode 11
- Directed by: Mike Vejar
- Written by: Rick Berman; Brannon Braga
- Production code: 311
- Original air date: November 26, 2003

Guest appearances
- Leland Orser – Loomis; Matt Winston – Temporal Agent Daniels; Jeffrey Dean Morgan – Xindi-Reptilian; Michael Childers – Strode

Episode chronology
← Previous "Similitude"	Next → "Chosen Realm"
- Star Trek: Enterprise season 3

"Carpenter Street" is the 63rd episode of the American science fiction television series Star Trek: Enterprise, the eleventh episode of season three. It first aired on November 26, 2003, on UPN in the United States. It was written by executive producers Rick Berman and Brannon Braga and directed by Mike Vejar.

Set in the 22nd century, the series follows the adventures of the first Starfleet starship Enterprise, registration NX-01. In season three, the ship enters the Delphic Expanse to search for a Xindi super weapon in response to an attack on Earth. In this episode, Captain Jonathan Archer (Scott Bakula) and Sub-commander T'Pol (Jolene Blalock) travel back to early 21st-century Earth to find a group of Xindi-Reptilians seeking to wipe out the human race by using a biological agent.

The Los Angeles production of the episode used several different methods to represent 21st century Detroit, including exterior shots around Los Angeles, exterior sets at the Lacy Street Production Center, and shots at the downtown New York standing sets at Paramount studios. The guest cast featured Matt Winston returning as Temporal Agent Daniels, and Jeffrey Dean Morgan as a Xindi-Reptilian. It had the lowest number of viewers of season three at that point according to the Nielsen ratings, a decline attributed to pre-Thanksgiving travel. Critical response was mostly negative, with criticism directed at the plot.

== Plot ==
Temporal Agent Daniels informs Captain Archer that three Reptilians have traveled back in time to Detroit, Michigan, to the year 2004, where they intend to produce a bio-weapon to annihilate humans. The Xindi Council had banned the use of bio-weapons, forcing the Reptilians to take extraordinary measures behind the council's back. Daniels sends Archer and Sub-Commander T'Pol back in time to investigate, and provides Archer with temporal tags, allowing them to bring back anything not belonging in 2004 to their own time-line.

Using a hand scanner, Archer is able to steal a vehicle, and T'Pol locates the Xindi bio-signs leading them to an abandoned factory on Carpenter Street. They notice Loomis, a blood bank employee, exiting the building. Suspecting something, they follow him home. After he tries to escape, T'Pol uses the Vulcan nerve pinch to stop him. When he awakes, he believes that Archer and T'Pol are police officers, and requests a lawyer. Archer punches him, and he admits delivering six bodies to his mysterious employers, each one for a different blood type. Archer comes up with a plan, and decides to pose as one of the victims.

After being delivered by Loomis, Archer realizes that they are developing some sort of a bio-weapon. Archer begins destroying their technology, and kills one of the three Reptilians. Two others try to escape with the deadly bio-agent, and Archer kills another one as they flee. The last Xindi escapes due to the interference of Loomis, who T'Pol stuns with her phaser. On the factory's roof, Archer corners him as he attempts to release the bio-agent. Archer and T'Pol tag all non-21st-century artifacts, and return to Enterprise. Loomis, still groggy in his car, is apprehended by real police officers and attempts to explain the "lizard people" and their "ray guns."

== Production ==
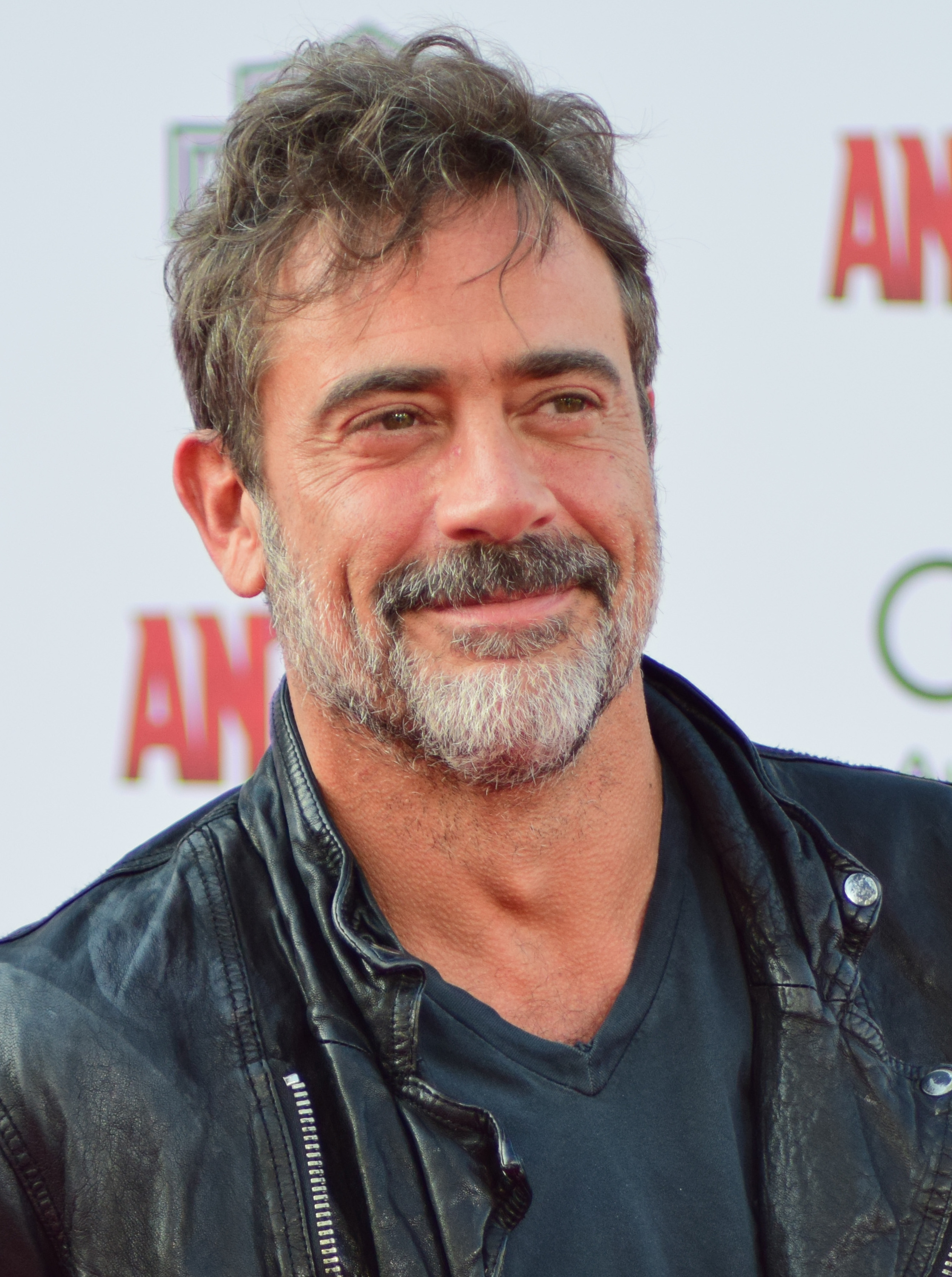
Actor Jeffrey Dean Morgan wanted to quit acting while appearing in "Carpenter Street" due to the makeup required for the role

The episode was written by Rick Berman and Brannon Braga, the executive producers of Star Trek: Enterprise. It was directed by Mike Vejar, his sixth episode of the series. He previously directed episodes for three other Star Trek series. When asked about the use of time travel stories in Star Trek in relation to "Carpenter Street", Scott Bakula said that "Obviously it's something you want to be careful of, and yet at the same time I'm told that the fans love the time travel episodes, and there's certainly an effort on Rick and Brannon's part to write things that they hope the fans will love. This particular journey back in time is very grounded in story." He added that he believed the episode setting was chosen because production values were "easily accomplished" and it "deals with germ warfare, and that certainly is a relevant topic today."

Guest stars on the episode included Matt Winston, who appeared for the fourth time as Temporal Agent Daniels, having last played him in the second-season episode "Shockwave". Returning to Star Trek, but appearing for the first time in Enterprise, was Leland Orser, who played Loomis. He previously appeared in the Star Trek: Voyager episode "Revulsion", as well as the Star Trek: Deep Space Nine episodes "The Die Is Cast" and "Sanctuary". Jeffrey Dean Morgan disliked portraying a Xindi Reptilian in "Carpenter Street". He later explained that "I had to pay my bills. I knew I'd play some guy saying some stuff. Then I got a call saying I needed to go in for a prosthetic fitting. I remember them dripping goop on my face, and I had straws sticking out of my nose. I couldn't eat lunch. I was claustrophobic. I'd go home in tears. This was the job that made me want to quit acting."

Filming began October 10, 2003, on the standing Enterprise sets as well as a temporary set which represented Loomis' apartment. It continued on the following Monday, along with production on both "Twilight" and "Similitude". On October 13, location shots began for "Carpenter Street" in downtown Los Angeles. As these scenes take place in darkness, they did not start until dusk and the shoot was conducted overnight. The first night comprised the scenes in 21st century vehicles, and the rest of the week was spent at the Lacy Street Production Center, which had urban settings which could represent the downtown Detroit area. During the following week, the production moved back to the Paramount lot where the standing New York Street back lot was used; this included the use of one area where a scene from Francis Ford Coppola's The Godfather (1972) had been shot. The episode finished filming on October 23, including an overlap with the production of "Chosen Realm" on October 22.

== Reception ==
"Carpenter Street" first aired on November 26, 2003, on the UPN network in the United States. It received a Nielsen rating of 2.9/4 percent, meaning that it was watched by 2.9 percent of all adults and 4 percent of all adults watching television at the time of the broadcast. This was the lowest ratings received by any episode during the third season. This slump had been attributed to the date of the broadcast, which had taken place on the night before Thanksgiving, a day which typically sees a large number of people travel, thereby decreasing the overall ratings of television shows.

In her review for the website TrekNation, Michelle Erica Green said that the episode entertained, but was an "ultimately pointless time-travel episode that redeems its existence primarily by not requiring a reset button." She thought that Orser was "superb" as the "repugnant" Loomis, and the episode was "entertaining fluff" but was "warm and witty and well-done." Jamahl Epsicokhan of Jammer's Reviews, called the episode a "turkey" and said that it was "a mediocre time-travel bore with barely enough plot for me to accuse of not making sense." He criticized the lack of explanation given to the Xindi's involvement in the Temporal Cold War, and said that the plot itself was akin to "swiss cheese" due to the number of plot holes. He gave the episode a score of one and a half out of four. Herc of Ain't It Cool News gave the episode 2.5 out of five, and said fans would likely react to the episode "with a collective shrug" and expressed his disappointment that "nothing of consequence is changed, learned or advanced."

The Digital Fix called this episode "dark and gritty" and said it brought some fun ideas.

== Home media release ==
A home media release of "Carpenter Street" has been as part of the season three DVD box set, released in the United States on September 27, 2005. The Blu-ray release of Enterprise was announced in early 2013, and released on January 7, 2014.
