= Cold Front =

Cold Front may refer to:

- Cold front, a weather event
- Cold Front (Star Trek: Enterprise)
- Cold Front (G.I. Joe)
- Cold Front (film)
- Cold front, RPG Maker game
