= Cold Front (Star Trek: Enterprise) =

- Star Trek: Enterprise episode
- Episode no.: Season 1 Episode 11
- Directed by: Robert Duncan McNeill
- Written by: Stephen Beck; Tim Finch
- Production code: 111
- Original air date: November 28, 2001

Guest appearances
- John Fleck - Silik; Matt Winston - Temporal Agent Daniels; Michael O'Hagan - Captain Fraddock; Joseph Hindy - Prah Mantoos; Leonard Kelly-Young - Sonsorra; Lamont D. Thompson - N.D. Alien Pilgrim

Episode chronology
← Previous "Fortunate Son"	Next → "Silent Enemy"
- Star Trek: Enterprise season 1

"Cold Front" is the eleventh episode (production #111) of the television series Star Trek: Enterprise. It was written by Stephen Beck and Tim Finch, and directed by Robert Duncan McNeill. The episode aired on UPN on November 28, 2001. The episode reveals more about the Temporal Cold War story arc first introduced in "Broken Bow". Captain Archer is confronted by a member of his crew who claims to be from nine hundred years in the future – and is there to capture a Suliban operative who has boarded Enterprise.

== Plot ==
Enterprise investigates a stellar nursery with several ships inside. Hailing one, they encounter a group on a pilgrimage to the Great Plume of Agosoria. Every eleven years, one of the protostars emits a neutron blast that the pilgrims consider a sacred event. Captain Archer invites the pilgrims to visit Enterprise. In Engineering, Commander Tucker explains the Warp 5 engine to the pilgrims. One alien discreetly disconnects an antimatter junction, and his arm morphs, revealing him as Suliban.

As Enterprise tries to go around a plasma storm, a bolt strikes the ship and causes an antimatter cascade that almost reaches the reactor, but is stopped by the disconnected junction. Tucker detects the sabotage in the junction, but does not suspect any of the crew. Crewman Daniels informs Archer that he believes one of the pilgrims is Silik, the Suliban whom Archer previously encountered. In his quarters, Daniels tells Archer he is not Starfleet but from the 31st century, commenting that the people who command Silik in the Temporal Cold War are from an earlier century. He comments that he has been sent to capture him, and asks for permission to tie his tracking technology into the ship's internal sensors.

Silik appears to Archer in his quarters and claims that Daniels' group was responsible for the antimatter cascade, and that the Temporal Accord is a lie. In Engineering, Daniels detects Suliban bio-signs, but is surprised and vaporized by Silik. T'Pol and Tucker summon Doctor Phlox to revive the now unconscious Archer. Archer asks Tucker to use Daniels' sensors to locate Silik while he and T'Pol visit Daniels' quarters to study the database that Archer saw earlier. It is gone. Silik escapes to Shuttle Bay 4, and refuses to surrender the device, so Archer shoots it from his hand. Silik opens the bay doors and freefalls to a waiting Suliban shuttlepod, and Archer asks Lieutenant Reed to seal off Daniels' cabin and any temporal secrets it may hold.

== Production ==
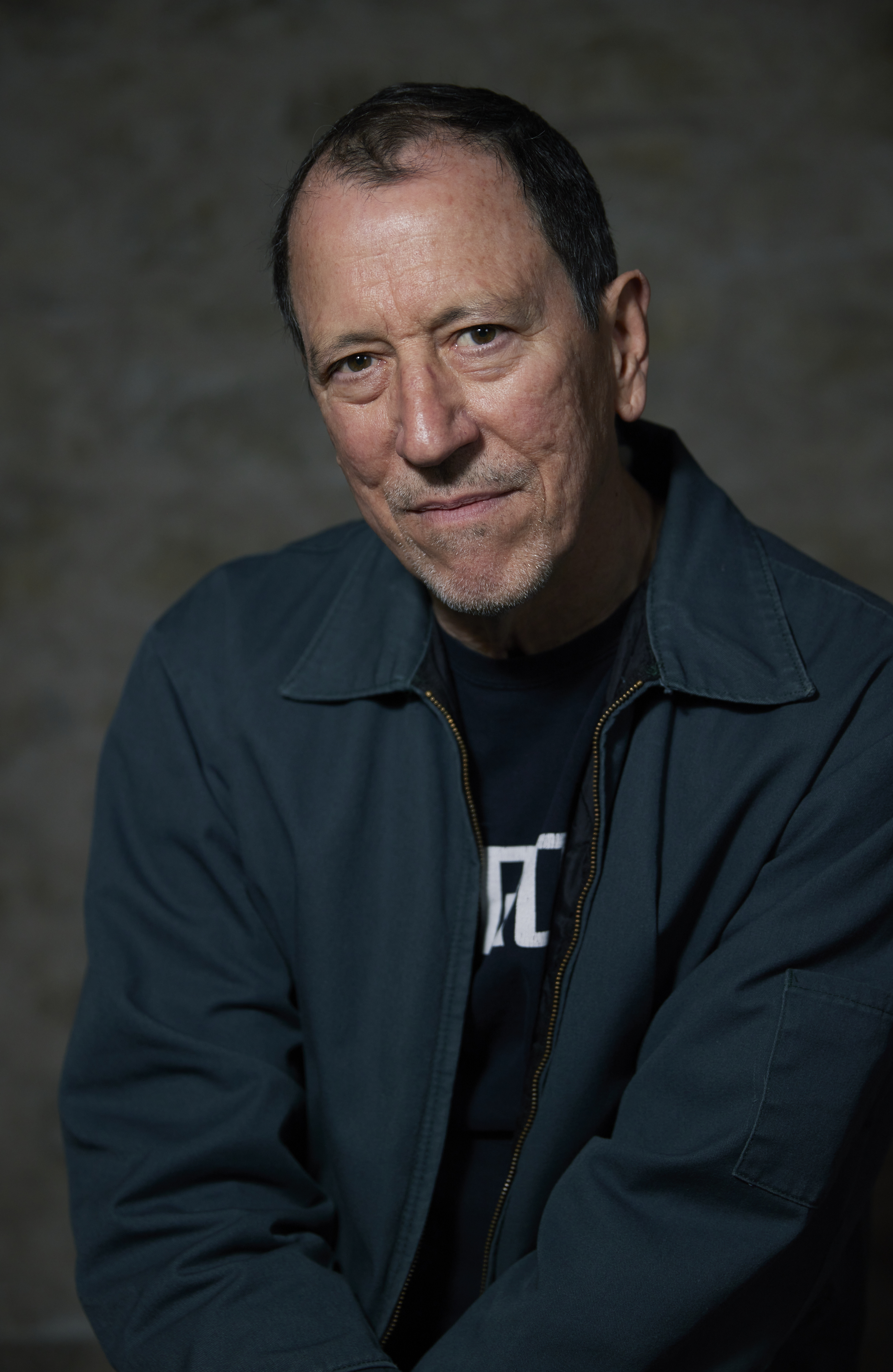
John Fleck guest stars as Silik as part of the ongoing Temporal Cold War storyline.

The episode was directed by Robert Duncan McNeill, who played Tom Paris in Star Trek: Voyager. McNeill had directed multiple episodes of Voyager, but missed on several chances to direct on shows that were cancelled before completing a full season, and was enthusiastic about directing on Season 1 of Enterprise. Around the time the pilot episode was filming, he asked Rick Berman to give him a chance to direct as soon as possible and asked what he needed to do to make it happen. He kept asking, and spent more time in editing and screening sessions, particularly screenings when Berman was in the room, to get a better understanding of the way Berman wanted things done. McNeill found it interesting to direct, it was only the second episode to feature the Suliban, and was a mystery that is not fully resolved by the end of the episode. McNeill later noted that there had been high expectations on set, "they were just getting going and everyone was a bit tense. It seemed to be a combination of the cast and crew trying to distance themselves from Voyager, and to establish the tone and style of the show."

Writers Stephen Beck and Tim Finch worked as executive story editors on this first season. Beck and Finch previously worked on the UPN series Seven Days before joining Enterprise.

John Fleck returns as a Borothan pilgrim and Silik. This is the first episode to include Matt Winston as Daniels. Winston is the son of special effects master Stan Winston.

== Reception ==
Cold Front was first aired in the United States on UPN on November 28, 2001. According to Nielsen Media Research, it received a 4.7/8 rating share among adults. This means it had an average of 7.33 million viewers. The top rated show for the hour was NBC's Christmas in Rockefeller Center. Enterprise came in fourth place.

Sunny Lee of Entertainment Weekly wrote: "Finally, they did it. The writers of this week's Enterprise, Steve Beck and Tom Finch, provided the season's first truly compelling episode. Until now, each show has been wrapped up in an agreeable but ho-hum way. But "Cold Front" was more complicated, with an ending that was both intriguing and unsettling." Chris Wyatt of Cinescape gave the episode a B+ grade. He enjoyed the plot, adding to the mystery of the Temporal Cold War storyline, but was disappointed by the choreography which made the fight scenes "seem stilted and a little silly". Aint It Cool News gave it four out of five, and said it was the "best Enterprise yet". Keith DeCandido of Tor.com gave it four out of ten in his 2022 rewatch. He did not appreciate the mystery elements of the story: "It's tiresome, it's not very effective, and it does a poor job of masking the fact that there's no actual story here."

In 2021, The Digital Fix praised this episode for having the "best moment" in season one of Enterprise, remarking it was a "bold twist" that established some mystery about what was going on with the ship's voyage.

== Home media ==
This episode was released as part of Enterprise season one, which was released in high definition on Blu-ray disc on March 26, 2013; the release has 1080p video and a DTS-HD Master Audio sound track.
