= List of Star Trek: Enterprise characters =

This is a list of recurring characters from the live-action science fiction television series Star Trek: Enterprise, which originally aired on UPN between 2001 and 2005. The television show takes place in the 22nd century of the Star Trek universe and takes place on a starship (NX-01 Enterprise) exploring space. Characters are ordered alphabetically by family name, and characters who played a significant recurring role in the series are listed here; the entire cast is also listed at List of Star Trek: Enterprise cast members.

Some of the reoccurring guest actors include Jeffrey Combs (who played the Andorian Shran), Vaughn Armstrong (Earth Admiral Maxwell Forrest), Randy Oglesby (Degra), Rick Worthy, and Scott MacDonald.

== Main ==
- Jonathan Archer, commanding officer of the USS Enterprise NX-01. Portrayed by Scott Bakula
- T'Pol, first officer and science officer. Portrayed by Jolene Blalock
- Phlox, chief medical officer. Portrayed by John Billingsley
- Travis Mayweather, conn officer. Portrayed by Anthony Montgomery
- Hoshi Sato, communications officer. Portrayed by Linda Park
- Charles "Trip" Tucker III, chief engineer. Portrayed by Connor Trinneer

=== Malcolm Reed ===
Malcolm Reed
- Star Trek character
- Portrayed by: Dominic Keating

In-universe information
- Species: Human
- Affiliation: Starfleet

Malcolm Reed, portrayed by Dominic Keating, was, at different times, the tactical officer and armory officer aboard the starship Enterprise. He held the rank of lieutenant.

Reed, born 2117, is English. Reed's parents are Stuart and Mary, and he has a sister, Madeline. They appeared on-screen in the episode "Silent Enemy" while communicating with Enterprise. In addition to his parents and sister, other known relatives are an Uncle Archie and "two spinster aunts."

Reed's great-uncle was in the British Royal Navy on Earth, but was killed in action while chief engineer of HMS Clement (a submarine that struck a mine, a leftover from an unmentioned war). Reed has a strong appreciation for his uncle, not only because of the heroics of this relative but also because they both share a common condition: aquaphobia, or the fear of drowning. He is one of the few men in his family who did not join the Royal Navy, a fact that led to some friction with his father, who is also a Royal Navy veteran. Reed is also an Eagle Scout, obtaining 28 merit badges, two more than his commanding officer, Jonathan Archer.

Reed is responsible for the development of or contributing to the development of procedures that are used throughout the Star Trek timeline. In the episode "Singularity", Reed develops what would be known as the Tactical Alert which would bring the ship to battle readiness at a moment's notice. This was jokingly referred to by Commander Tucker as the "Reed Alert". Reed initially liked the idea but then decided it was "a bit narcissistic". The Tactical Alert would evolve into the condition "Red Alert" and "Yellow Alert" used in all other Star Trek series.

Reed has an almost suicidal sense of self-sacrifice, and can also be consumed at times with regret over paths not followed in his love life, due to his inability to "get close" to women; he and Charles Tucker III have at least one ex-girlfriend in common. In one alternate timeline seen during the Xindi mission, in which Enterprise becomes a generational ship unable to return to Earth, Reed dies without leaving any heirs, having been unable or unwilling to find a mate. The episode "Shuttlepod One" reveals that Reed has an apparent crush on T'Pol, but this was never expanded upon further; he even went so far as to state to Trip that " T'Pol has an awfully nice bum!" It is worth noting that Keating intentionally played him as gay, and stated so multiple times. 2007 interview 2013 interview

The episode "Divergence" revealed that in 2149, Reed, then an ensign, had been recruited as an operative for a mysterious offshoot of Starfleet Intelligence, which in Star Trek: Deep Space Nine would be identified as Section 31. He believed he had left Section 31 behind when he was posted aboard Enterprise in 2151; however, in 2154, he is reactivated as an agent during a mission to recover Phlox, who has been kidnapped by a group of Klingons trying to stop a genetically engineered virus running rampant in the Empire. Part of his mission involved sabotaging a piece of evidence that might have assisted Enterprise in tracking down the Klingons faster. For this, Reed is temporarily relieved of duty and incarcerated in the brig by Archer, although Archer later reinstates Reed after determining that he had been placed in what Archer called "an impossible situation" by his Section 31 superior, Harris.

Following the Klingon mission, Reed demands that Harris never communicate with him again. Harris, however, replied that Reed had committed himself to a cause he could never simply walk away from. Indeed, Reed would later re-establish contact with Harris under orders from Archer during the Terra Prime incident.

==== Reception ====
In 2018, The Wrap ranked Reed as the 31st-best character of Star Trek overall, noting he developed the Tactical Alert (i.e. Red Alert) of Star Trek lore. In 2016, the character was ranked as the 29th-most-important character of Starfleet within the Star Trek science fiction universe by Wired magazine.

Den of Geek recommended the following episodes for the character, "Singularity" and "Affliction". They were "fascinated" by the character's development of starship security.

== Recurring ==
=== Daniels ===
Daniels
- Star Trek character
- First appearance: "Cold Front" (2001)
- Last appearance: "Storm Front" (ENT, 2004) "Life, Itself" (DSC, 2024)
- Portrayed by: Matt Winston (ENT); David Cronenberg (DSC)

In-universe information
- Species: Human "more or less"
- Affiliation: United Federation of Planets

In the Star Trek universe, Daniels is an operative in the cross-history conflict called the Temporal Cold War. Daniels is from the 31st century, c. 3064 CE. He is first seen in "Cold Front" as a member of Archer's crew. Soon after, he was killed during a Suliban incursion aboard Enterprise. His quarters, which contained several time travel-related devices, was locked down and banned to all crew members, except in cases of emergency involving the Temporal Cold War.

Daniels explained little of the nature of his organization, preferring to keep the group's nature, organization and abilities mostly unknown, to keep Captain Archer from learning too much about the future. His method of transporting others through time was unusually subtle, lacking any obvious visual effects or disorientation. Typically, Archer would walk through a door on the Enterprise and suddenly find himself in an unfamiliar location and time period; Daniels would then appear to talk to him. Daniels pulled off a similar feat on a much larger scale in the episode "Storm Front": When the Enterprise returned to Earth after the battle with the Xindi, the crew discovered that they had arrived during World War II.

How Daniels survived being vaporized in "Cold Front" was never explained. Daniels continued to make occasional appearances in the series. In the first-season finale, "Shockwave", Daniels transported Archer to an altered version of the 31st century in which the United Federation of Planets had never existed. Daniels, apparently the only other person besides Archer left on Earth who knew about the main timeline, helped the captain restore the original timeline. In the third-season episode "Carpenter Street", he sent Archer and T'Pol back to the year 2004 to investigate why some Xindi Reptilians were on Earth in that time period. He was also seen in the episode "Azati Prime", in which he transported Archer into the future—placing him aboard a future starship called the Enterprise-J, to inform him about the Sphere Builders and their relationship to the Xindi. He later transported Archer to the year 2161 ("Zero Hour"), giving him a glimpse of the inauguration ceremony for the United Federation of Planets (which occurred in a later episode, in "These Are the Voyages..."), warning Archer that allowing the Xindi to change history would result in the destruction of the UFP before it even existed. In his final appearance in the fourth-season premiere, "Storm Front", he was apparently extremely ill: parts of him were more than a hundred years old while other parts were almost at a fetal stage. He used his last remaining strength to transport Archer and the Enterprise to Earth in the year 1944 to stop an alien race from changing history and allowing the Nazis to win World War II. After warning T'Pol that the Temporal Cold War had exploded into a full-fledged conflict, Daniels apparently died, but with the collapse of the Temporal War, Daniels reappeared and returned Archer to his original timeline.

At this point, Archer told Daniels in no uncertain terms he never wanted to see him again.

In Star Trek: Discovery's series finale "Life, Itself", set in the 32nd century, the mysterious Doctor Kovich (in his 10th appearance in that series) is revealed to be an older Daniels, introducing himself to Michael Burnham as "Agent Daniels of the USS Enterprise—and other places."

Crewman Daniels is not to be confused with another Starfleet officer, Lieutenant Daniels (played by Michael Horton), who was the tactical officer on the USS Enterprise-E during the events of Star Trek: First Contact and Star Trek: Insurrection.

=== Degra ===
Degra
- Star Trek character
- Portrayed by: Randy Oglesby

In-universe information
- Species: Xindi Primate
- Affiliation: Xindi Council

In the Star Trek science fiction franchise, Degra (2103–2154) is a primate of the species Xindi. He is a representative in the Xindi Council but also a weapons designer, on the third season story arc. He was first seen in "The Xindi" and referred to by name in "Rajiin". He was played by Randy Oglesby.

Degra was also a scientist and engineer. He studied the mysterious spheres in the Delphic Expanse. Degra helped to design the power systems on the Xindi-Reptilian warships, and developed several theories for planet-destroying weapons. Circa 2152, the Xindi Council learned from the Sphere Builders that humans were going to destroy them in the 26th century. Degra agreed to design a planet-destroying weapon, completing the prototype in 2153.

He was married with two children. When the first weapon arrived in the Sol System, Degra and the other council members watched as the Reptilian pilot fired the weapon, killing seven million people. As he watched the telemetry, Degra asked himself, "How many of those seven million were children?"

Several months afterwards, Degra and his colleagues constructed the second weapon and planned to test it in the Calindra system. The test appeared to be successful, but the weapon failed to destroy one of the system's moons. Degra's hope to see what went wrong was dashed when the weapon was taken by an unknown ship.

Shortly afterwards, Degra and his crew were captured by the starship Enterprise (NX-01). While on board, Captain Archer launched an elaborate ruse to trick Degra to reveal the location of the weapon. Degra gave them the coordinates of the star system Azati Prime, but he was tipped off. Archer then launched another ruse, making it seem that the Enterprise reached Azati Prime. Degra protested, claiming that the Xindi defense perimeter would destroy the Enterprise—and accidentally exposing the location of the weapon. Right afterwards, Degra and his crew's memories were erased.

Three weeks later, Captain Archer reached Azati Prime on a suicide mission to destroy the weapon, but was captured. He tried to convince Degra that the weapon's purpose was false. Three days later, Degra and Janar boarded the Enterprise to find evidence that they were misled by the Sphere Builders. During this time, a Reptilian warship arrived and demanded that Degra undock. Degra and the Enterprise succeeded in disabling the ship. However, to prevent the exposure of his new alliance with Archer, Degra destroyed the Reptilian ship, killing all 22 crew members.

This incident led to the end of Degra's life in February 2154. When Archer confronted the Council, the Primates, Arboreals, and Reptilians voted and agreed to postpone the weapon launch. Shortly afterwards, Commander Dolim met Degra in his quarters and stabbed him. As Degra died, Dolim vowed that "when the humans have been eliminated, when the Council is replaced by Reptilian rule," he would find Degra's family and kill them. Dolim was killed by Jonathan Archer before this threat could be carried out.

In 2005, The Digital Fix praised the character Degra, as the "surprise star of the entire season" and noting that "Degra rises above the other anonymous members of the council to become a fully rounded individual."

=== Dolim ===
Dolim
- Star Trek character
- Portrayed by: Scott MacDonald

In-universe information
- Species: Xindi Reptilian
- Affiliation: Xindi Council

In Star Trek: Enterprise, Commander Dolim is a reptilian representative of the multi-species race Xindi on the Xindi Council, played by Scott MacDonald.

He was a military commander of a Reptilian regiment. Dolim hand-picked from his regiment the reptilian pilot for the Xindi weapon kamikaze attack on Earth in 2153. Dolim was absolutely ruthless in his duties; when his daughter gave birth to a slightly deformed male child (who would be unable to join the military because of these deformities), Dolim promptly ordered the boy's execution.

When the Enterprise reached Azati Prime, the site of the weapon construction site, Captain Archer embarked on a suicide mission to destroy the weapon, but was captured by Insectoids and interrogated by Dolim. When Archer refused to say how many Earth ships entered the Expanse, Dolim ordered an attack squadron to destroy Enterprise, but the ships were recalled by Degra, Mallora, and Jannar.

Dolim's relationship with Degra plummeted shortly afterwards. While at a secret meeting with Enterprise, Degra destroyed a Reptilian scout ship, killing all 22 crewmen. The Reptilians were later able to find a sensor encoder. A few days later, Archer confronted the Xindi Council. Dolim voted to postpone the weapon launch, but meant no such thing. Shortly afterwards, Dolim met Degra in his quarters. Dolim stabbed Degra and vowed to kill his family when the Council was replaced by Reptilian rule. Dolim later admitted killing Degra to the Council, only regretting not doing it sooner.

Shortly afterwards, the Reptilians and Insectoids took control of the Xindi planet-killer. Enterprise, as well as Primate and Arboreal ships, engaged the reptilian/insectoid armada. The fleet and weapon then escaped into a vortex. Just before they did, Dolim captured Ensign Hoshi Sato.

Sato was captured to arm the weapon. The weapon was designed to be armed with three activation codes (the reptilians and insectoids only had two).

Sato was able to add her own layer of encryption. However, to preserve their future, the Sphere Builders helped decipher the codes. Just then, Enterprise, the primate/arboreal fleet, and six Aquatic ships arrived to confront the reptilians. When this occurred, the sphere builders activated one of their spheres and created another anomaly field that disabled three powerful aquatic ships and several smaller arboreal vessels. The reptilians used this to their advantage and escaped into a vortex, having armed the weapon.

Dolim was motivated solely by reptilian dominance. While heading for Earth, Dolim fired on insectoid Shrest's ship. His ship was damaged and the hulk that remained was smashed when it crashed into the weapon. Dolim only used them to get the second activation code.

The weapon emerged two million kilometers from Earth. If they had all five codes, they could have fired instantly, but as it was they needed extra time. As the weapon armed, Dolim's ship engaged and destroyed an unarmed civilian space station.

Degra's ship arrived and transported Archer and his MACO team to the weapon. The MACOs killed the Reptilian soldiers and Archer began to deactivate the reactor, planting explosives to destroy the weapon. Dolim transported to the weapon to reverse the damage. Meanwhile, the Andorian ship Kumari destroyed Dolim's ship.

As the reactor began to overload, Archer completed the destruction sequence. Dolim then engaged him in hand-to-hand combat. During the struggle, Archer placed an explosive charge on his back. Archer detonated the charge, blowing up Dolim.

=== Maxwell Forrest ===
Admiral Forrest
- Star Trek character
- Portrayed by: Vaughn Armstrong

In-universe information
- Species: Human
- Affiliation: Starfleet
- Posting: Starfleet Command
- Rank: Vice Admiral

Maxwell Forrest is a Vice Admiral in Starfleet. He was played by Vaughn Armstrong in Star Trek: Enterprise. Admiral Forrest was named after DeForest Kelley, who played Doctor McCoy in The Original Series.

Vice Admiral Forrest (often referred to in dialog as just "Admiral") was in frequent contact with Jonathan Archer during the Enterprise's missions.

During the 2140s, then-Commodore Forrest oversaw the NX Program, Earth's attempt to develop a starship with warp drive faster than warp 2.

It was on his orders that the Enterprise's missions began. He frequently clashed with Vulcan Ambassador Soval over the crew's performance.

Forrest was killed in a terrorist bombing of Earth's embassy on Vulcan while saving the life of Ambassador Soval in "The Forge". Admiral Gardner succeeded him in his post at Starfleet Command.

==== Mirror Universe ====
A Mirror Universe version of Forrest, who achieved the rank of captain and became commanding officer of the Imperial Star Ship Enterprise, appears in "In a Mirror, Darkly". In this universe, Forrest's first name was Maximilian, not Maxwell. Forrest fell victim to a mutiny led by his first officer, Jonathan Archer. Later, Forrest was released from the brig by his loyal officers and tried to retake the ship. However, Forrest was forced to trust Archer when the Imperial Starfleet ordered Enterprise to cross into Tholian space and claim the USS Defiant, which the Tholians recovered from the "normal" universe. The Tholians attacked; Forrest fought back aboard the Enterprise, ordering the crew to abandon ship. The Tholians destroyed the ship, killing Forrest.

=== Major Hayes ===
Major J. Hayes
- Star Trek character
- Portrayed by: Steven Culp

In-universe information
- Species: Human
- Affiliation: MACOs
- Posting: Enterprise MACO detachment commanding officer
- Rank: Major

Major J. Hayes, played by Steven Culp, first appeared in the third-season premiere, "The Xindi".

Hayes' first name was not revealed in the TV series, although his first initial "J" was embroidered on his uniform. Licensed spin-off media give contradictory first names; Andy Mangels and Michael A. Martin's non-canon novel Last Full Measure indicates Hayes' given name is Joss, but in the expansion set "These Are the Voyages..." for the Star Trek Customizable Card Game his card features the name Jeremiah.

The episode "Hatchery" reveals that Hayes graduated from the United States Military Academy at West Point. The character was introduced as the leader of the elite Military Assault Command Operations (MACO) team assigned to Enterprise when the ship was sent to the Delphic Expanse. Subsequent episodes featured a running rivalry with Lieutenant Malcolm Reed over shipboard security. Hayes and Reed resolved their rivalry in the episode "Harbinger", after a physical altercation prompted Captain Archer to reprimand both men.

In the penultimate third-season episode, "Countdown", Hayes and three MACO soldiers beam onto a Xindi ship to rescue Ensign Hoshi Sato. A malfunction did not allow everyone to beam back at once, so Hayes sent everyone ahead of him first. Hayes is killed after being shot and fatally wounded by a Xindi-Reptilian as he was being beamed back to Enterprise.

=== Erika Hernandez ===
Erika Hernandez
- Star Trek character
- Portrayed by: Ada Maris

In-universe information
- Species: Human
- Affiliation: Starfleet
- Rank: Captain

Captain Erika Hernandez, portrayed by Ada Maris, is introduced in the fourth-season episode "Home".

Hernandez is the second Starfleet captain given command of a starship in Earth's Warp 5 program, and is assigned to Columbia (NX-02), the sister ship of Enterprise (NX-01).

"Home", which takes place in 2154, establishes that some years earlier Hernandez and Enterprise captain Jonathan Archer were in a relationship, which is briefly rekindled during a therapeutic holiday Archer takes following the Xindi mission. Their relationship apparently ended because they realized that their jobs would get in the way of a serious relationship, but they remain on good terms afterwards.

In the episode "Affliction", Hernandez accepts the transfer of Enterprise chief engineer Charles Tucker, though she has to withstand complaints from her engineering crew, including requests for reassignment, due to Tucker's hard-driving manner of working.

==== Reception ====
In 2016, Erika was ranked as the 52nd-most-important character of Starfleet within the Star Trek science fiction universe by Wired magazine.

=== Jannar ===
Jannar
- Star Trek character
- Portrayed by: Rick Worthy

In-universe information
- Species: Xindi Arboreal
- Affiliation: Xindi Council

Jannar is an arboreal (similar to a sloth) representative of the multi-species race Xindi in the Xindi Council. Previously known as Narsanyala. He was played by Rick Worthy in the third season of Star Trek: Enterprise.

When the Council learned that humans were going to destroy them in the 26th century, Degra was assigned to build a weapon to destroy Earth. Jannar agreed that the humans had to be destroyed, even though his race is most likely pacifist. Like several other council members, Jannar voted against the creation of a bioweapon.

Late in the weapon's construction, Degra started to have second thoughts about building it. Jannar kept assuring Degra that it was necessary. However, he also started having second thoughts shortly afterwards. He and Degra went aboard Enterprise, when Captain Archer began to tell them they were manipulated to attack Earth. Although Jannar didn't seem to believe Archer, he still admitted that his evidence is intriguing. Eventually, he became a close ally of humans and Archer.

=== Mallora ===
Mallora
- Star Trek character
- Portrayed by: Tucker Smallwood

In-universe information
- Species: Xindi Primate
- Affiliation: Xindi Council

Mallora was a Xindi primate, played by Tucker Smallwood. The character was never named onscreen, but is called "Mallora" in The Expanse by J.M. Dillard, the novelization of Star Trek: Enterprise episodes "The Expanse" and "The Xindi". Smallwood came up with his own name for his character, "Depac", based on the celebrity Deepak Chopra. This is the name he puts on convention autographs.

Mallora was the chairman of the Xindi Council. He was also a friend of Degra for many years.

Circa 2150, the Xindi Council were told that humans were going to destroy them in the future. Degra was assigned to be the head of the planet-destroying weapon project. Mallora, like several other council members, rejected Reptilian scientist Damron's proposal to construct a bioweapon.

Late in the weapon's construction, Degra and Jannar were shown evidence that if they destroyed Earth, it would only ensure their own extinction. Mallora was skeptical that the humans manufactured the "evidence" to save their world. Later, he became a close ally of the humans, and helped them destroy the superweapon. He later assured T'Pol that Captain Jonathan Archer's sacrifice would not be forgotten, and that the Xindi Council would reconvene.

Smallwood explained in an interview that the makeup used on him created serious eye problems, as the extensive paste and spray used to apply the makeup clogged his tear ducts.

=== Thy'lek Shran ===
Shran
- Star Trek character
- Portrayed by: Jeffrey Combs

In-universe information
- Species: Andorian
- Affiliation: Andorian Imperial Guard, Andorian Empire, United Federation of Planets
- Rank: Commander; General

Thy'lek Shran is a recurring character in Star Trek: Enterprise. Shran is an Andorian. He was played by Jeffrey Combs, who has played numerous characters in three other Star Trek series. Shran is a highly capable and decorated officer in the Andorian Imperial Guard. He holds the rank of commander, and when first seen was the commanding officer of the starship Kumari. His first name was revealed from computer records of the USS Defiant in the episode "In a Mirror, Darkly (Part II)". He is emotional, quick to anger, prone to risk, xenophobic, daring and excitable, as well as being fiercely loyal to friends and those he feels he owes—the antithesis to the Vulcans.

Shran's first contact with humans—who, like most Andorians, he refers to as "pink-skins"—came in 2151, when Shran led a commando team in a raid on the Vulcan monastery at P'Jem. Shran and his people were convinced that the Vulcans were secretly using P'Jem to spy on the Andorians—a suspicion which later proved true when Captain Jonathan Archer exposed a secret Vulcan listening post at the monastery. Shran was indebted to Archer for this, and later returned the favor by rescuing Archer and his officers from a terrorist attack on the world of Coridan.

Shran, like most Andorians, did not trust Vulcans, believing them to be duplicitous and sneaky. Shran and his team led an attempt to reclaim the planet Weytahn, which the Andorians had colonized but which the Vulcans also claimed as their own. Captain Archer was the only person whom Shran felt he could trust to mediate the dispute.

Later, Shran repaid this debt as well, by leading his starship into the Delphic Expanse to help Archer and his crew steal a prototype super-weapon constructed by the Xindi. Shran, however, had his own agenda—his superiors had ordered him to steal the prototype and claim it for Andoria. Shran obeyed, but when his military tried to bestow a medal upon him, Shran angrily refused, regretting the fact that he had been forced to double-cross a trusted ally. Shran later returned to aid Archer and Earth by helping to destroy the real Xindi superweapon before it could do the same to Earth.

In 2154, when Romulan spies threatened to start a war between Vulcan and Andoria, Shran captured Vulcan ambassador Soval and reluctantly tortured him to verify the location and strength of the Vulcan fleet, which Soval had leaked to him, believing it necessary to avert all-out war, but Shran distrusted this seemingly incredible information, suspecting that it could be a provocation or deliberate misinformation. When Soval refused to change his statements, lie, and thereby end the torture session, Shran found a new respect for the ambassador. Later, Shran's help was invaluable in exposing Romulan attempts to infiltrate the Vulcan government, and war was averted. Shortly after this, Shran became romantically linked with his tactical officer Talas. She initiated the pairing; Shran later told Jonathan Archer that he had the choice between arresting her and mating with her. He chose the latter.

In 2154, Shran was devastated when the Kumari was destroyed by a remote controlled Romulan prototype ship, disguised as a Tellarite vessel. Nearly Shran's entire crew were lost, and his lover, Talas, later died from wounds she received in a firefight that occurred when Shran attempted to coerce a confession from the Tellarite ambassador. To avenge the deaths of his crew and Talas, Shran demanded to fight the ambassador in a ritualistic form of combat known as an Ushaan, but Captain Archer claimed the right to substitute himself in the Tellarite's place. Shran considered Archer a close friend and did not want to fight him, but Archer insisted, and fought Shran nearly to the death. Though Archer declined to kill Shran, the ritual was completed when Archer sliced off one of Shran's antennae, incapacitating him, and Shran's desire for revenge was satisfied. Later, Shran helped Archer contact an offshoot race of the Andorians, the Aenar, which led to the destruction of the Romulan prototype. On his way back to his homeworld, Shran wondered whether he would ever get another starship command, as the Andorian military tends to come down hard on any commander whose ship is lost. Computer records taken from the USS Defiant (NCC-1764) reveal that Shran eventually reached the rank of General.

While initially resentful of the "pink-skins", Shran found that he actually admired and respected humans, particularly Captain Archer. He also has warmed to Vulcans, particularly Soval and T'Pol, whom he considers honorable people. Shran even made Archer an honorary member of the Andorian Guard, sometime after Archer became Earth's ambassador to Andoria.

The final episode of Enterprise, entitled "These Are the Voyages...", takes place a few years in Enterprise's future, where Shran has a wife, Jhamel (an Aenar whom Shran had earlier befriended) and a daughter, Talla. In 2161, Shran once again enlists Captain Archer's aid when Talla is kidnapped by criminals who think Shran has stolen a priceless artifact from them. This request comes as a surprise to Archer, as Shran was believed killed several years earlier. Shran later reveals that he had faked his own death in part to protect his family from criminal elements Shran had worked for after leaving the Andorian military. Talla is successfully rescued from Rigel X, but the kidnappers later attack and board Enterprise; Commander Tucker sacrifices his own life to stop them.

The USS Shran, a Federation Starfleet vessel named after him, is part of the Battle at the Binary Stars depicted in the Star Trek: Discovery episode of the same name.

==== Apocrypha ====
In the novel The Good That Men Do (by Andy Mangels and Michael A. Martin), Shran has a significant role. He is not, as "These Are the Voyages..." suggests, married to Jhamel (the events of that episode are said to be largely faked), although he has a latent telepathic bond with her. They do not have any children, although by the end of the novel Shran joins Jhamel's bonding group, so Talla could conceivably be born "for real" sometime later. Shran aids Enterprise crew in recovering a group of Aenar who had been kidnapped for use as slaves by the Romulans (the episode's use of Talla as a substitute in the holographic coverup is to prevent the exposure of Section 31's mission into Romulan territory to recover the Aenar). Shran's telepathic bond with Jhamel is employed to search for the Aenar and recover them from Romulan custody.

Unlike in the episode, the criminals who board Enterprise are not looking for Shran, and do not think he has stolen anything from them; the pirates were actually hired by Archer to fake Trip's death, by giving Trip an excuse to sacrifice his own life to stop the pirate "attack". Shran's ultimate fate is unknown, although the novel leaves open the possibility that he could rejoin the Andorian military (as the series itself suggested).

Also, in the novel, Shran has a different full name: Hravishran th'Zoarhi. This was done in order to give Shran a name more in line with those used by Andorian characters in other Trek novels. In the novel The Romulan War: Beneath the Raptor's Wing, also by Michael A. Martin, the word Thy'lek is said to be the Aenar form of Shran's name.

Manny Coto, showrunner for Star Trek: Enterprise in its fourth season, has said that if the show had survived to a fifth season, Shran would have joined the crew of the Enterprise (NX-01).

==== Reception ====
In 2018, CBR ranked Shran the 16th-best recurring character in all of Star Trek.

=== Silik ===
Silik
- Star Trek character
- Portrayed by: John Fleck

In-universe information
- Species: Suliban

Silik was a high-ranking official in the Suliban Cabal during the Temporal Cold War—a secretive war fought between various alien factions using "temporal agents" to change historical events for self-seeking purposes.

During the Temporal Cold War, Silik received his orders from an enigmatic humanoid from the future. To aid in his fight, Silik and his cohorts from the Suliban Cabal were granted valuable genetic enhancements including more heightened senses and the ability to shape-shift—features that would become prodigiously exploited by Silik (and which could be taken away as punishment for failure). Silik is killed in "Storm Front".

=== Arik Soong ===
Arik Soong
- Star Trek character
- Portrayed by: Brent Spiner

In-universe information
- Species: Human
- Affiliation: None, formerly Starfleet

Dr. Arik Soong appeared in a three-episode final-season story arc consisting of "Borderland", "Cold Station 12", and "The Augments". He was portrayed by The Next Generation regular Brent Spiner. He is the great-grandfather of 24th century cyberneticist Dr. Noonien Soong, who created the androids Data, Lore, B-4 (all portrayed by Spiner), and Juliana Tainer.

Arik Soong believed genetic engineering was a panacea to humanity's problems. As a result, he questioned humanity's abandonment of genetic engineering in debates with Jonathan Archer and Phlox. Although he lamented the deaths of thirty million humans during the Eugenics Wars, Soong believed the Earth government and humanity in general was using the conflicts as an excuse for their irrational phobia of genetic engineering. He maintained that he himself and humanity in general had learned the lessons of the Eugenics Wars and should not continue hiding behind those events when there was progress to be made now that the technology had matured and was much more practicable.

While director of the Starfleet Medical facility Cold Station 12, Soong stole nineteen genetically enhanced Augment embryos placed in stasis after the end of the Eugenics Wars. Soong took the embryos to a remote and secluded planet, where he raised them and taught them they were superior to other humans. Starfleet caught up with Soong when he was off on a side trip, and imprisoned him ten years after the theft, leaving the Augments stranded with just his teachings and the physical necessities for survival. As they grew up alone, they became violently committed to the formation of a genetically engineered race of superhumans, believing themselves to be the future of humanity.

Twenty years after the theft, and ten years into Soong's prison sentence, his Augments stole a Klingon Bird-of-Prey. Enterprise was tasked with finding them to avert a war with the Klingons, and took along Soong to make the search easier. The Augments freed Soong from the Enterprise's brig and proceeded to Cold Station 12, where the remaining 1,800 genetically-enhanced embryos were stored. Soong found, to his dismay, that his Augments had taken his teachings to an extreme, and he escaped from the Bird-of-Prey to help Enterprise stop them from starting a war with the Klingons.

Ultimately failing to prove that improved humans could peacefully co-exist with the rest of the galaxy, Soong, upon returning to prison, admitted that perfecting humanity may not be possible. He vows to find perfection by creating artificial life through cybernetics, noting that it might take "a generation or two", a vision apparently passed on to his progeny, specifically Noonien Soong.

=== Soval ===
Soval
- Star Trek character
- Portrayed by: Gary Graham

In-universe information
- Species: Vulcan
- Affiliation: Vulcan High Command

Soval is the Vulcan ambassador to Earth in the 22nd century where he often takes the role of advising and representing Vulcan interests to Earth's Starfleet Command.

Jonathan Archer, Captain of the Starship Enterprise, is not particularly fond of the Ambassador as he appears to play a major role in the Vulcan discouragement of Earth's deep space program. He objected to Archer's command of the Enterprise. Soval places T'Pol on board the Enterprise, though she becomes one of Archer's most trusted officers.

Soval continues his criticism of Enterprise's mission, particularly after the crew, along with a group of Andorian commandos led by Commander Shran, discover a listening post beneath the Vulcan sanctuary of P'Jem which is being used to spy on the Andorians. Soval reluctantly agrees to work with Archer when they are dispatched to mediate a dispute over a planetoid claimed by both the Vulcans and Andorians. The situation is jeopardized early on when their shuttle is shot down while en route to meeting with Shran. Archer is able to defend the Ambassador and discover that Andorian soldiers acting against Shran's order are responsible. After initial talks between Soval and Shran prove promising, Soval concedes that Archer's service has been useful.

After a Xindi attack on Earth kills seven million humans, Archer claims that a mysterious figure from the future who was allied with the Suliban gave him information on the rationale for the attack, and more vitally, the name of the alien race responsible for the attack. Soval is skeptical of this claim, and discourages Enterprise from entering the Delphic Expanse, the mysterious region of space the Xindi call home.

Soval comes to appreciate Archer's efforts in saving Earth, and his attitude toward humans warms considerably after the man in charge of Starfleet Command, Admiral Forrest, sacrifices himself to save the Ambassador during a bombing inside the Earth Embassy on Vulcan ("The Forge").

It is subsequently revealed that Soval developed a deep affinity and even affection for humans and that his earlier actions were more to protect them than to hinder them. Nonetheless, after Archer and his crew help to prevent a war between Vulcan and Andoria and expose corruption within the Vulcan High Command ("Kir'Shara"), Soval agrees with the decision for Vulcan to stop looking over Earth's shoulder in space exploration matters.

Soval represents Vulcan at initial talks held in 2155 aimed at forging an alliance of worlds including Earth, Vulcan, Andoria and the Tellarite homeworld, an organization that, in 2161, will become the United Federation of Planets. Although Soval initially opposed Jonathan Archer's mission, when Archer gives a key speech at the start of the 2155 summit, it is Soval who leads the applause.

Soval is secretly one of the persecuted 3% of Vulcans born with the ability to instigate mind melds, an act considered taboo amongst Vulcans of the 22nd century. To extract information about the bombing of Earth's embassy on Vulcan, Soval initiates a mind-meld between himself and an ailing human MACO security guard at the embassy who witnessed the attack. This mind-meld is considered to be the first between a Vulcan and a human.

After the confession of his mind-melding abilities, Soval is forced to resign from the Vulcan High Command. He consequently joins the Enterprise crew to prevent a Vulcan preemptive strike based on falsified information against Andoria. After V'Las is exposed and the Vulcan High Command is dissolved, he is reinstated to his original position. He later represented Vulcan during the Coalition of Planets conference.

In the Mirror Universe, Soval's counterpart is an enlisted crewman in Starfleet, serving as a science officer aboard the ISS Avenger. This version of Soval attempts to start a rebellion against the Terran Empire, but is killed when the Avenger is destroyed by the mirror Jonathan Archer.

=== Talas ===
Talas
- Star Trek character
- Portrayed by: Molly Brink

In-universe information
- Species: Andorian
- Affiliation: Andorian Imperial Guard
- Posting: Kumari
- Rank: Lieutenant

Talas was a female of the Andorian species, a lieutenant on the Andorian starship Kumari under the command of Commander Shran. She was played by Molly Brink.

Shran and Talas served together on the Kumari for many years. Later, Talas developed a romantic interest in Shran, who eagerly returned Talas' affections. (Andorian females are known for their sexual aggressiveness, and Talas was certainly no exception.) Shran felt especially honored to be chosen by Talas, who came from a privileged, wealthy family on their homeworld. Talas had the freedom to choose any career she wished, but chose the military—endearing her to Shran as a soldier. She could also have any man she wanted, but chose Shran—endearing him to her as a lover.

Talas died in the line of duty in late 2154 when she was shot by the aide of a Tellarite ambassador. Andorian and Tellarite delegations had been at each other's throats aboard Enterprise, while trying to negotiate a peace treaty. Captain Jonathan Archer had confined all delegates to their quarters, but the Andorians—mistakenly believing that a Tellarite starship had destroyed the Kumari—escaped and broke into the Tellarite quarters, and a fight quickly broke out. After Enterprise's MACOs had taken control of the situation and the Andorians had stood down, the Tellarite ambassador's aide grabbed Talas' weapon and shot her in the shoulder.

At first, the wound did not appear to be life-threatening, but Talas' condition quickly worsened. Andorians are especially vulnerable to infections from laser fire, and Talas sickened and died before Dr. Phlox could devise a treatment.

Talas' death devastated Shran, who demanded the right to ritual combat with the Tellarite who killed her. At the last minute, Captain Archer substituted himself in the Tellarite's place; while Shran was reluctant to fight his friend Archer, the combat proceeded without incident (ending when one of Shran's antennae was sliced off, incapacitating but not killing him), and Shran's revenge was satisfied.

=== Commander Williams ===
Williams (Commander)
- Star Trek character
- Portrayed by: Jim Fitzpatrick

In-universe information
- Species: Human
- Affiliation: Starfleet Commander

Commander Williams was a 22nd-century human United Earth Starfleet officer during the 2150s.

He, along with Admiral Forrest and Admiral Leonard, was part of the group from Starfleet Command that dealt with the Klingon Klaang's crash-landing on Earth and its consequences about how to proceed with the injured Klingon in April 2151.

In 2152 he defended Captain Jonathan Archer after Ambassador Soval accused him of abducting Subcommander T'Pol by not meeting a rendezvous with a Vulcan ship as ordered.

Later that year, he accompanied Admiral Forrest to the Arctic Circle to investigate a missing research team. He had owed Drake, one of the members of the team, a bottle of scotch.

Williams was also involved in debriefing Archer after his successful mission to the Delphic Expanse to destroy the Xindi superweapon.

Williams was played by Jim Fitzpatrick and was named after William Shatner, the Original Series actor who played James T. Kirk.

== See also ==
- List of Star Trek characters
