= Silent Enemy (Star Trek: Enterprise) =

- Star Trek: Enterprise episode
- Episode no.: Season 1 Episode 12
- Directed by: Winrich Kolbe
- Written by: André Bormanis
- Production code: 112
- Original air date: January 16, 2002

Guest appearances
- Jane Carr - Mary Reed; Guy Siner - Stuart Reed; Paula Malcomson - Madeline Reed; John Rosenfeld - Mark Latrelle; Robert Mammana - Engineer

Episode chronology
← Previous "Cold Front"	Next → "Dear Doctor"
- Star Trek: Enterprise season 1

"Silent Enemy" is the twelfth episode (production #112) of the television series Star Trek: Enterprise, and was written by André Bormanis. Winrich Kolbe served as director for the episode, which has music by Velton Ray Bunch. Several guest stars include Jane Carr, Guy Siner, Paula Malcomson, and John Rosenfeld. This episode first aired on UPN on January 16, 2002.

The show takes place in the 22nd century, with the premise that a starship is exploring the galaxy but encounters various alien species. The episodes typically focus on the efforts of the crew to resolve a situation, and often have morality play as part of the story.

Enterprise is attacked by an unknown alien starship, as Captain Archer orders the crew to install experimental "phase cannons". Meanwhile, Ensign Sato is asked to find out what Lieutenant Reed's favorite food is for a birthday dinner.

This is the only episode of the Enterprise series to have been directed by Kolbe and was the final Star Trek episode directed by him.

== Plot ==
In September 2151, while deploying subspace amplifiers to improve their ability to communicate with Starfleet, Enterprise is approached by an alien vessel. Captain Archer hails them, but the vessel returns to warp. He wonders why: Ensign Sato points out that the Universal Translator is far from perfect; and Sub-Commander T'Pol says that some species have motives that cannot be understood in human terms. Soon, the mysterious ship returns and scans Enterprise, sending a high pitched screech through the com systems, and firing on them before again jumping to warp.

Archer notes that Enterprise is now encountering more aggressive species than anticipated, and sets course for Earth so that Jupiter Station can finish the weapons refit. Commander Tucker and Reed ask to be allowed to complete the work themselves, but Archer disagrees, though he gives them permission to begin the procedure. While doing so, the alien ship returns and disables Enterprise's warp drive and main power. Strange alien bipeds then board the ship, and assault two crew-members. They return to their ship, damaging a warp nacelle before departing again. Mayweather suggests contacting the Vulcan High Command for help, but both subspace amplifiers have been destroyed.

Two days later, Enterprise locates an uninhabited planet for a weapons test, which produces a blast yield 10 times the expected output, due to an unexpected surge. T'Pol traces the anomalous reading to Launch Bay 2, to a device tapped into internal sensors and comm channels. Archer then sends the aliens a message: he does not want a fight but will protect his ship by any means necessary. With that, he destroys the device. T'Pol detects the alien vessel again, which uses a re-edited version of Archer's earlier message to demand surrender. After the new cannons are ineffective against their attacker, Archer asks if Reed can intentionally repeat the previous overload of the cannons. Reed complies and damages the alien vessel, knocking out their shields. Reed follows up with two torpedoes before the aliens depart.

== Production ==
Science consultant Andre Bormanis had previously written for Star Trek: Voyager and this was his first script for Enterprise. He thought it was a risk to never explain the motivations of the attacking aliens but that was also his favorite part of story. "I think our earliest encounters with alien life forms will leave us utterly baffled" said Bormanis. This was the first and only episode of Enterprise directed by Winrich Kolbe who directed a total of 48 Star Trek episodes Bormanis said the episode turned out better than he imagined and praised [Rick] Kolbe for his use of widescreen to bring a more "cinematic" style to the episode. The episode was previously titled "Call To Arms" but was renamed as there was already a Deep Space Nine episode with that name.

The unknown aliens were designed by visual effects producer Dan Curry. They were realized using computer generated models built by John Teska, who had previously brought Species 8472 to life for Star Trek Voyager. They were informally referred to as "Shroomies" by production staff because of the mushroom-like shape of their heads. In 2013 the Star Trek: Online video game named them "The Elachi". Christopher L. Bennett also reinterpreted the unknown aliens, including them in his novel "Star Trek: Enterprise - Rise of the Federation: A Choice of Futures (2013)", where they are called the Vertians. The enemy ships were designed by John Eaves, and were inspired by the Lockheed F-117 Nighthawk.

Composer Velton Ray Bunch joined the series with this episode, after having been recommended by Scott Bakula who worked with him on Quantum Leap. He received conflicting instructions from different producers, with some advising against deviating too far from the established music style, and others encouraging him to push the envelope. Bunch said his style tended to be more rhythmic than other composers, not necessarily percussion and drums, but a constant kind of underlying pulsing tension with the orchestra layered on top. He was surprised and upset by extensive changes that were made to his score, but learned from Dennis McCarthy to accept that it was normal for the show.

== Reception ==
Silent Enemy was first aired on UPN on January 16, 2002. According to Nielsen Media Research, it received a 3.7/6 rating share among adults with an average of 6.1 million viewers. Enterprise was in fourth place in the ratings for the hour.

Michelle Erica Green of TrekNation was ambivalent about this episode, she enjoyed it at the time, but criticized it for not being scary and the lack of dramatic or character development. Keith DeCandido of Tor.com gave it 6 out of 10.

In 2021, The Digital Fix said this was one of the best episodes in season one, noting its mystery. In 2024 Den of Geek ranked it 14th among the 15 worst episodes of all Star Trek, blaming the characterization of Reed as an "irritating blank".

== Home media ==
This episode was released as part of Enterprise season one, which was released in high definition on Blu-ray disc on March 26, 2013; the release has 1080p video and a DTS-HD Master Audio sound track.
