= 11:59 (Star Trek: Voyager) =

- Star Trek: Voyager episode
- Episode no.: Season 5 Episode 23
- Directed by: David Livingston
- Story by: Brannon Braga; Joe Menosky
- Teleplay by: Joe Menosky
- Production code: 217
- Original air date: May 5, 1999

Guest appearances
- Kevin Tighe as Henry Janeway; Bradley Pierce as Jason Janeway; John Carroll Lynch as Gerald Moss; Kristina Hayes as Marci Collins; Christopher Curry as Automobile Driver; James Greene as Passerby

Episode chronology
| ← Previous "Someone to Watch Over Me" | Next → "Relativity" |
- Star Trek: Voyager season 5

"11:59" is the 117th episode of the science fiction television series Star Trek: Voyager, the 23rd episode of the fifth season.

This television episode first aired on May 5, 1999, on the television network UPN and was directed by David Livingston. Kevin Tighe guest stars alongside a flashback version of a Janeway ancestor; the story was by Joe Menosky. Much of the story is set in a fictional version of Earth in the last few days of the year 2000, reaching a climax at 11:59 PM on December 31.

== Plot ==
Neelix becomes interested in Earth history, spurring research about an ancestor of Captain Janeway named Shannon O'Donnell, who was alive at the turn of the 21st century, and whom Janeway believes single-handedly fought to complete the Millennium Gate tower project in 2000, and would later be part of NASA's missions to Mars. Neelix, prompted by Janeway, proceeds to track down further information on Shannon.

Neelix and Seven of Nine discover that Janeway's information was incorrect: Shannon was a traveler who happened to have her car break down in the small town of Portage Creek in Indiana where the Millennium Gate was to be built. Set on December 27, 2000, the plan has caused most of the businesses in town to leave, save for a bookstore owned by Henry Janeway, who refuses to sell the store to make way for the project. Shannon joins Henry in the opposition, and learns that if Henry refuses to sell, the project would have to be moved to a new location. The two also develop a bond during this time. Shannon is offered a job by the company if she can convince Henry to leave before the 11:59 deadline on New Year's Eve 2000. When she tells Henry this, he asks her to leave. As she drives away, she turns around, and tries another approach to convince Henry to sell. He eventually relents at the very last minute, selling his bookstore to allow the tower to go forward.

Captain Janeway is disappointed to learn the truth about Shannon, who was never a NASA astronaut, as Shannon was her childhood hero and the stories about her convinced her to join Starfleet. However, Neelix has provided a surprise: a gathering of the senior staff to celebrate their ancestors, and presenting Janeway with a photograph of the elderly Shannon, after she had married Henry and raised their extended family together. Janeway realizes that the revelation about Shannon should not impact what she has done with her own life.

== Production ==
Story-writers Brannon Braga and Joe Menosky developed the idea for the episode from a pitch from John de Lancie, who played Q in the series, which would have included Q and Guinan. Braga and Menosky wanted to create a more grounded story, and so a different direction was taken. Menosky stated about the writing, "Our original inspiration for this was to do an episode where we didn't see Voyager at all. All we saw was Kate Mulgrew playing a distant ancestor. The idea was to tell a quintessentially Star Trek story without any science fiction."

== Reception ==
In 2015, a Star Trek: Voyager binge-watching guide by W.I.R.E.D. suggested skipping this episode. McMillan criticized the episode, saying it was clearly intended to be a special episode looking at Janeway's ancestor and inspiration, but rather than showing "women can be important astronauts too, the episode instead detours into an awkward [...] morality play about big business crushing the little guy around the turn of the millennium". Jammer's Reviews gave it 3 out of 4 stars. Tor.com gave it 5 out of 10.

In 2020, The Digital Fix praised this for experimenting with storytelling by using the historical setting, and felt it "could have been great" but ended up as "somewhat dull Hallmark movie".

TrekNews.net ranked this the 8th best episode of Star Trek: Voyager in 2016. They note that the character Captain Janeway remembers one of her ancestors in this episode, and it examines how our perceptions of people can change over time.

== Releases ==
"11:59" was released on LaserDisc in Japan on June 22, 2001, as part of 5th Season vol.2, which included episodes from "Dark Frontier" to "Equinox, Part I". The episode had two audio tracks, English and Japanese. This set had 6 double sided 12" optical discs giving a total runtime of 552 minutes.

On November 9, 2004, this episode was released as part of the Season 5 DVD box set of Star Trek: Voyager. The box set includes 7 DVD optical discs with all the episodes in Season 5 with some extra features, and the episodes have a Dolby 5.1 Digital Audio track.

== See also ==
- "Carbon Creek" (Star Trek: Enterprise)
