= Vaughn Armstrong =

American actor (born 1950)

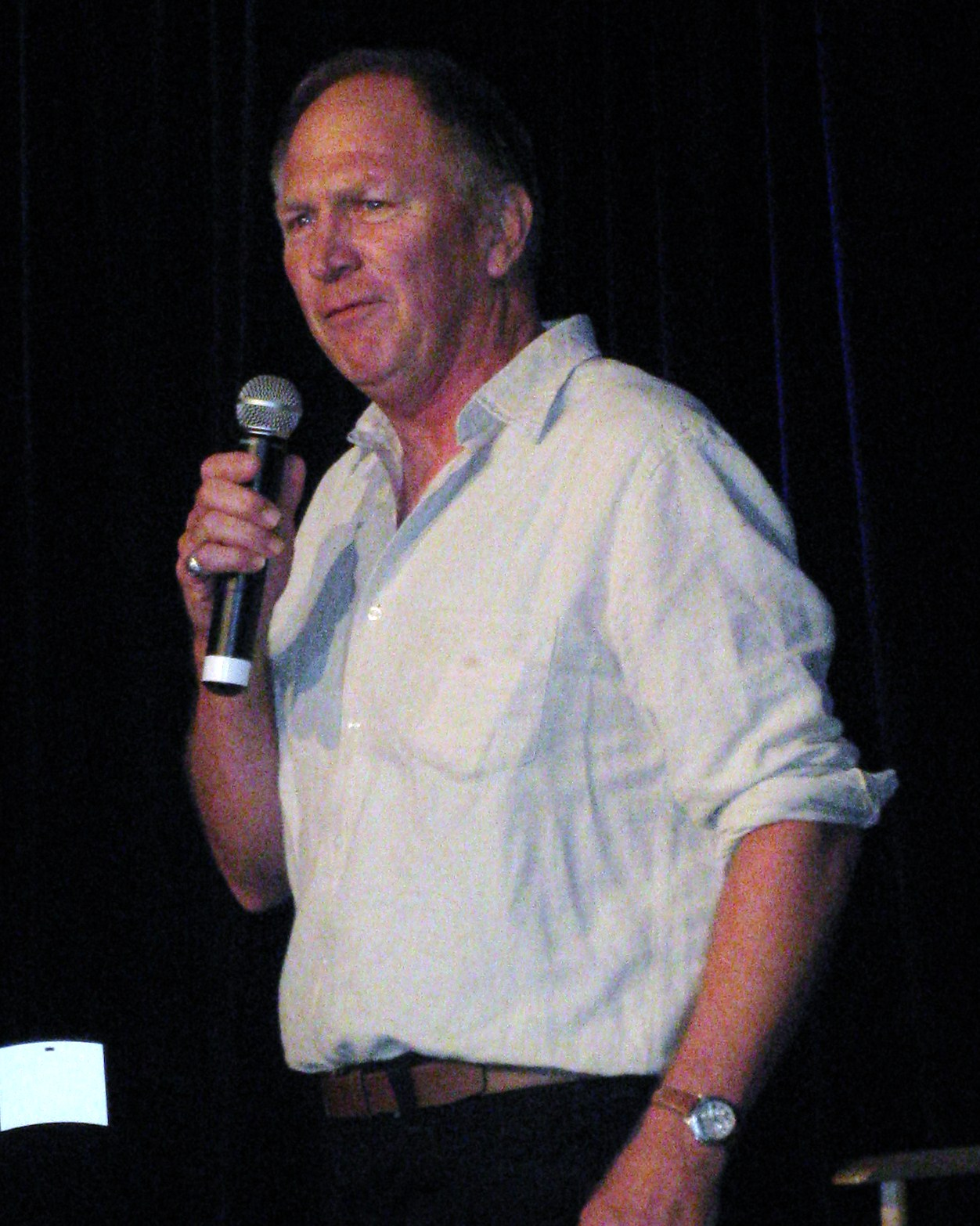
- Born: July 7, 1950 (age 76); Sonora, California, U.S.
- Occupation: Actor

Vaughn Dale Armstrong (born July 7, 1950) is an American actor. He is noted for portraying many characters in the Star Trek franchise, in four Star Trek television series. He is perhaps best known as the recurring character Admiral Maxwell Forrest in Star Trek: Enterprise. He has played twelve Star Trek characters.

In 1985, Armstrong portrayed drill instructor Sergeant Williams in a production of the play Tracers at the Coronet Theater in Los Angeles. In 1989, he played Father Larkin, a priest-principal of a Catholic school, in Stand-up Tragedy at the Mark Taper Forum in Los Angeles. In 1992 he appeared in an episode of Quantum Leap as Fred Trump (alongside his future Enterprise co-star Scott Bakula). In 2008, he had the role of Will Torrey, an American union representative in Ravensridge at the Fremont Centre Theatre in South Pasadena, California.

== Filmography ==
=== Film ===
Year	Title	Role	Notes
1977	Cinderella 2000	Tom Prince	
1978	Coma	Jefferson Institute Security Guard	Uncredited
1983	Triumph of a Man Called Horse	Captain Cummings	
1984	The Philadelphia Experiment	Cowboy	
1986	Richard II	N/A	Direct-to-video filmed performance of the eponymous play by the Globe Theater in San Diego
1992	Life on the Edge	Gary Hayes	
1994	Clear and Present Danger	Blackhawk Pilot	
1995	The Net	Trooper	
1998	Star Trek: The Experience - The Klingon Encounter	Korath	Ride movie
2004	Star Trek: The Experience - Borg Invasion 4D	Narrator (voice)	Ride movie
2007	Trail End	Ed	Short film
2008	Finding Amanda	Cowboy at Aztec	
2010	Fruit of Labor	Sam	Short film
2016	Unbelievable!!!!!	Russell Sprout	
2019	The Obituarist	Don Fitzsimmons	Short film
2019	Riley Parra: Better Angels	Patty the Doorman	
2025	The Surrender	Robert	
TBA	Catch and Release	Chad	Short film

=== Television ===
Year	Title	Role	Notes
1977	ABC Weekend Special	Officer Gilligan	Episode: "My Dear Uncle Sherlock"
1977	Roger and Harry: The Mitera Target	Heller	Television movie
1978	Lou Grant	Harry Baker	Episode: "Sports"
1978	Wonder Woman	Eric	Episode: "Screaming Javelins"
1978	The Winds of Kitty Hawk	Reporter	Television movie
1979	A Man Called Sloane	Snyder	Episode: "The Venus Microbe"
1983–1985	Simon & Simon	Capitain/Policeman	2 episodes
1984	Matt Houston	N/A	Episode: "Criss Cross"
1984	Finder of Lost Loves	Andrew	Episode: "A Gift"
1985	Faerie Tale Theatre	Guard	Episode: "The Snow Queen"
1985	Remington Steele	Rob O'Connell	Episode: "Premium Steele"
1985	Alfred Hitchcock Presents	Marine	Episode: "The Right Kind of Medecine"
1986-2002	Days of Our Lives	Stan/Forger/David Caldwell/Harry	20 episodes
1987	Scarecrow and Mrs. King	Trooper #2	Episode: "Do You Take This Spy ?"
1988	Jake and the Fatman	Swatman #1	Episode: "What is This Thing Called Love"
1988	Star Trek: The Next Generation	Commander Korris	Episode: "Heart of Glory"
1989	Cheers	Mr. Osborn/Uncle Val	2 episodes
1989	High Desert Kill	Paul Bettencamp/Alien	Television movie
1990	Family of Spies	Szady	2 episodes
1990	Generations	Policeman	3 episodes
1991	Mission of the Shark: The Saga of the USS Indianapolis	Robinson	Television movie
1992	The Bold and the Beautiful	Don Kessler	2 episodes
1992	Quantum Leap	Fred Trump	Episode: "It's A Wonderful Leap"
1992	Seinfeld	Lieutenant Coleman	2 episodes
1992	Saved by the Bell	Mr. Breskin	2 episodes
1993	The Adventures of Brisco County, Jr.	Major	Episode: "A.K.A Kansas"
1993-1999	Star Trek: Deep Space Nine	Seskal/ Gul Danar	3 episodes
1994	Phenom	Hitting Partner	Episode: "Brian and the Tennis Star"
1994	One West Waikiki	Boat Capitain	Episode: "Along Came A Spider"
1995-1996	Melrose Place	Capitain/Minister	2 episodes
1995-2001	Star Trek: Voyager	Telek R'Mor/ Lansor/ Two of Nine/ Vidiian Capitain/ Alpha Hirogen/ Korath	5 episodes
1996	Frasier	Tony	Episode: "It's Hard to Say Goodbye If You Won't Leave"
1996	Home Improvement	Lieutenant Colonel Hall	Episode: "Tanks for the Memories"
1996	Babylon 5	Security Guard #1	2 episodes
1996	Moesha	Police Officer	Episode: "Credit Card"
1996	If These Walls Could Talk	Painter	Television film
1996	Baywatch Nights	Fred Briggs	Episode: "The Creature"
1997	Murder One	Mr. Hassick	Episode: "Chapter 10, Year 2"
1997	Dark Skies	Lee Minikus	Episode : "Burn Baby Burn"
1997	Two Voices	Dr. Gibbott	Television film
1997	C-16: FBI	Airport FBI Agent #1	Episode: "Pilot, Part 1"
1998	NYPD Blue	Roland Dixon	Episode: "Speak for Yourself, Bruce Clayton"
1998	Profiler	Marty Hemmet	Episode: "Cycle of Violence"
1998	Pensacola: Wings of Gold	Heart Attack	Episode: "Nuggets"
1998	I Married a Monster	Sheriff Collins	Television film
1998	Beverly Hills, 90210	Mr. O'Lare	Episode: "I'm Back Because"
1998-1999	JAG	Judge Williams/Lane Black	2 episodes
1999	Buffy the Vampire Slayer	Cop	Episode: "The Zeppo"
1999	E.R.	Greg Mitchell	Episode: "Responsible Parties"
2000	The West Wing	Sergeant MacNamara	Episode: "Celestial Navigation"
2000	Power Rangers Lightspeed Rescue	Agent Armstrong/Agent Myers	2 episodes
2000	Seven Days	Bill Stevens	Episode: "Playmates and Presidents"
2000	The Theory of Everything	Walter	Television film
2001	The Beast	The Man	Episode: "The Damage Done"
2001	Philly	Irene's Husband	Episode: "Porn Again"
2001-2005	Star Trek: Enterprise	Maxwell Forrest/ Kreetassan Capitain	18 episodes
2002	The Guardian	Newburg's Attorney	Episode: "Privilege"
2002	Expedition	Dr. A. Saxon	Television film
2003	Mister Sterling	Warden	Pilot episode
2003	The District	Charles Wallace	Episode :"Untouchable"
2006	The Christmas Card	Colonel Ashby	Television film
2007	Smith	FBI Head	Episode: "Seven"
2008	Mad Men	Shel Keneally	Episode: "Flight 1"
2008-2015	Criminal Minds	Ben Kebler/Vernon Duncanson	2 episodes
2010	Project 420	Agent Armstrong	5 episodes
2011	Law & Order: LA	Mike Foreman	Episode: "East Pasadena"
2011	Desperate Housewives	Civil War Major	Episode: "Searching"
2012	CSI: Crime Scene Investigation	Dr. Dennis Keil	Episode: "Split Decisions"
2012	Eagleheart	General Walters	Episode: "Tramps"
2012	The Bold and the Beautiful	Judge Wilkins	Episode: "#9962"
2015	Modern Family	Mel	Episode : "Crying Out Loud"
2015	The Fosters	Mr. Olsen	Episode : "Wreckage"
2015	Crazy Ex-Girlfriend	Principal	Episode : "I Hope Josh Comes To My Party!"
2017	Decker	Dr. Peterson	4 episodes
2018	Pappy	Pappy	5 episodes
2018	Riley Parra	Patty the Doorman	2 episodes

=== Video games ===
Year	Title	Role	Notes
1995	Wirehead	Dr. Slitcon	
1996	Disruptor	President Krieger	
2001	Star Trek: Armada II	Additional voices	Voice
2002	Star Trek: Bridge Commander	Captain Korbus/Karoon Captain	Voice
2002	Star Trek: Starfleet Command III	Additional voices	Voice
2003	Star Trek: Elite Force II	Additional voices	Voice

=== Podcasts ===
Year	Title	Role	Notes
2022	Shuttlepod Show	Himself	1 episodes
