= Dear Doctor =

- Star Trek: Enterprise episode
- Episode no.: Season 1 Episode 13
- Directed by: James A. Contner
- Written by: Maria Jacquemetton; Andre Jacquemetton
- Production code: 113
- Original air date: January 23, 2002

Guest appearances
- Kellie Waymire - Crewman Elizabeth Cutler; David A. Kimball - Esaak; Christopher Rydell - Alien Astronaut; Karl Wiedergott - Larr

Episode chronology
← Previous "Silent Enemy"	Next → "Sleeping Dogs"
- Star Trek: Enterprise season 1

"Dear Doctor" is the thirteenth episode of the first season of the American science fiction television series Star Trek: Enterprise, and originally aired on January 23, 2002, on UPN. The episode was written by Maria and Andre Jacquemetton, and was directed by James A. Contner.

Set in the 22nd century, the series follows the adventures of the first Starfleet starship Enterprise, registration NX-01. In "Dear Doctor", Dr. Phlox (John Billingsley) faces a serious dilemma as a dying race begs for help from the crew of the Enterprise. The culture consists of two related races, but only the more genetically advanced race has been stricken by a planet-wide plague.

The episode is significant for introducing the concepts and motivations of the Prime Directive just prior to the founding of the United Federation of Planets. UPN requested that the ending of the episode be changed, something that Billingsley did not like. However, he and other members of the cast and crew approved of the final episode. Due to the subject matter and the ending, it is seen as a controversial episode critically and by audience response. Although "Dear Doctor" received the same audience share as the previous episode, there was a 6.6% drop in viewers to 5.7 million viewers for its first broadcast.

== Plot ==
Doctor Phlox receives a letter from his Interspecies Medical Exchange counterpart, Doctor Jeremy Lucas, who is serving a term on Denobula. He begins to compose a letter back, describing his experiences with the crew, and the ways in which humans are different. Meanwhile, on the Bridge, the crew are discussing a pre-warp vessel they have encountered. The alien they speak with, a Valakian, begs them to assist with a medical emergency their species is facing. Sub-Commander T'Pol reveals that the Vulcans are unaware of the species, but she agrees with Captain Jonathan Archer to help them. Phlox continues his letter, describing the challenges of treating the disease – with over fifty million lives at stake.

Enterprise arrives at the Valakian homeworld, where they are met by Esaak, the Valakian director of a clinic, and Larr, a Menk orderly. T'Pol, Phlox, Archer, and Ensign Hoshi Sato make a tour of the medical facility. Sato discovers that there is a second lesser-evolved yet unaffected race, the Menk, who live alongside the Valakians. Phlox makes the startling discovery that the Valakians are slowly dying out, not from an easily curable medical condition, but because of a genetic disease which is experiencing an accelerated rate of mutation. He also believes that the answer to a cure may lie in the Menk.

Archer, meanwhile, is debating whether to provide the Valakians with Warp drive, ultimately deciding against it. Upon further investigation, Phlox learns that the Valakians suffer from the illness because their gene pool has reached a "dead end" and that the Menk are undergoing an "awakening process." He also finds that the Valakians have been stifling and underestimating the Menk. He has found a cure, but does not believe it would be ethical to administer. Archer considers how a "Prime Directive" would be helpful, and provides the Valakians with medicine that will diminish the symptoms for a decade, anticipating the Menks' natural evolution and new levels of understanding between them.

== Production ==
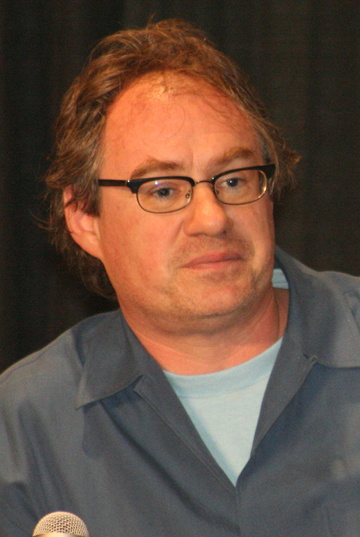
John Billingsley preferred the original ending where Archer and Phlox disagreed.

The episode was written by husband and wife writing team Maria and Andre Jacquemetton, who previously wrote the episode Breaking the Ice. It was the first of five episodes of Enterprise directed by James A. Contner.

UPN requested a modified ending to the episode, as the original version had Phlox and Archer disagreeing over what to do with the Valakians. Archer would have wanted to save the race, while Phlox would have wanted evolution to take its course. John Billingsley, who played Doctor Phlox in Enterprise, didn't agree with the changed version, saying "the ending that had initially been created I was fairly comfortable with. But the head of the studio suggested some revisions on the ending. What do you do? I wasn't as happy with the revisions, but it's not my show, you have to sort of adjust, even if sometimes it does seem a bit of a contradiction in terms for what your character is supposed to be about." Billingsley later said "I know people were a little in two minds of that episode. I rather liked that episode."

Billingsley also enjoyed the romantic subplot with Kellie Waymire as Elizabeth Cutler, however he was concerned that Waymire's working schedule wouldn't allow her to return to the show easily and so he wasn't anticipating the romance being followed up upon in future episodes. She had previously appeared as Cutler in the episode "Strange New World", and was pleased for her character to be involved with Phlox rather than one of the more obvious possibilities, and was interested to see if the romantic plot would be brought back by writers in a future episode. Waymire made one final appearance as Cutler in "Two Days and Two Nights", before her sudden death on November 13, 2003. Amongst other guest stars in this episode was Karl Wiedergott, who previously appeared in the Star Trek: Voyager episode "Warlord" and is better known for his voice work on The Simpsons.

== Reception ==
"Dear Doctor" was first aired on UPN on January 23, 2002. The episode was watched by 5.7 million viewers and received a 3.7/6 percent share. This means that it was seen by 3.7 percent of all 18- to 49-year-olds, and 6 percent of all 18- to 49-year-olds watching television at the time of the broadcast. This was the same share as the previous episode, "Silent Enemy", but a 6.6% drop in the number of actual viewers overall.

Michelle Erica Green of TrekNation described "Dear Doctor" as the "first truly great episode" of Enterprise and compared it to "Pen Pals" from Star Trek: The Next Generation and "Tuvix" from Star Trek: Voyager in the way that the ethical dilemma is presented. She enjoyed the "seamlessly interwoven subplots and moving character development" and the pace of the episode, but wanted to see more of the society of the two races. Peter Schorn of IGN, reviewing the first season, described "Dear Doctor" as one of the more solid episodes. Jamahl Epsicokhan, on his website Jammer's Reviews, said that it was "by miles the best episode so far". He calls it a "real story" with an actual issue, and praises the performance of John Billingsley as Phlox. Aint It Cool News gave the episode 3.5 out of 5, and described the episode as "Thought-provoking, fast-paced and wholly devoid of action sequences". Keith DeCandido of Tor.com gave it 1 out of 10 in his 2022 rewatch, calling it "a morally repugnant, despicable, horrible, awful, revolting episode that's a blight on the franchise." In his season 1 overview he reiterated that the low rating he gave it, joint lowest with "Acquisition", was well-deserved.

The episode was received warmly by members of the Enterprise cast and crew. Anthony Montgomery said prior to the end of the first series that he "absolutely loved 'Dear Doctor'; I thought that was fantastic". After the end of the series, John Billingsley named the episode as one of his favourites as it was the first time he felt the character was three-dimensional, and executive producer Brannon Braga subsequently called the episode a "classic". Writer André Bormanis said that "Dear Doctor" was a "great example of a classic Star Trek / Science Fiction "what if" scenario that raised interesting and complex social issues."

=== Accolades ===
Dear Doctor has been listed among the best episodes of Star Trek: Enterprise and of all Star Trek. The A.V. Club include this episode on their list of 10 episodes that best represented the series, reviewer Alasdair Wilkins noted that the episode has been called the best or worst of the first season depending on who you asked. Wilkins praised John Billingsley for his nuanced performance. TrekNews.net rated it 8th on their top 10 essential episodes of Enterprise.
Io9 listed the top 100 Star Trek episodes, and placed "Dear Doctor" in 45th place. Vox rated this one of the top 25 essential episodes of all Star Trek. Screen Rant ranked this episode the 14th darkest episode of the Star Trek franchise. They note that it starts off as a medical mystery, but culminates in Archer committing genocide.
Den of Geek in a review of important show characters, highlighted this episode along with "Stigma", "The Breach", and "Doctor's Orders" for the Phlox character.

=== Controversy ===
Almost immediately after airing, "Dear Doctor" received criticism from fans who disagreed with the conclusion of the episode. John Billingsley said in an interview afterwards that he "had a feeling that probably there'd be some upset". He didn't pay much attention to the response of fans on the internet, and said of the online criticism that he "wasn't aware of it until well after the fact". It was subsequently mentioned in an article on ethics in Star Trek written by Faith and Ethics reporter Stuart Laidlaw of the Toronto Star, who compared the actions of Phlox and Archer at the end of the episode to the response of the international community during 1994's Rwandan genocide.

== Home media release ==
The first home media release of the episode was on VHS in the UK on August 5, 2002. It was first released in the United States on DVD (480 lines of resolution), having been released as part of the season one box set during May 2005. The Blu-ray (1080p) release of Enterprise was announced in early 2013, and was released in the United States on March 26 with the UK release following on April 1.

== See also ==
- For Whom the Bell Tolls (film) (Movie night film in this episode)
- Homeward (Star Trek: The Next Generation) (January 17, 1994)
