= J. Paul Boehmer =

American actor (born 1965)

- Born: October 30, 1965 (age 60); Dayton, Ohio, U.S.
- Education: Southern Methodist University (BFA); University of Delaware (MFA)
- Occupation: Actor
- Years active: 1993-present
- Spouse: Offir Dallal
- Children: 2

J. Paul Boehmer (born October 30, 1965) is an American actor and voice artist, best known for his television work in the Star Trek universe. He also had roles in other television shows such as Frasier, Lost, and Nip/Tuck. In feature films, Boehmer has appeared in Skyline and George Clooney's The Good German.

Boehmer is also a known performer in the stage and voice world, with appearances in US regional theatre and Broadway and a catalogue of audio books via Books on Tape and Listening Library, as well as a teacher of voice and speech at the Los Angeles High School of the Arts.

Boehmer graduated with bachelor of fine arts from Southern Methodist University and is a 1992 master of fine arts graduate of the Professional Theater Training Program at the University of Delaware.
