= Matt Winston =

American actor (born 1970)

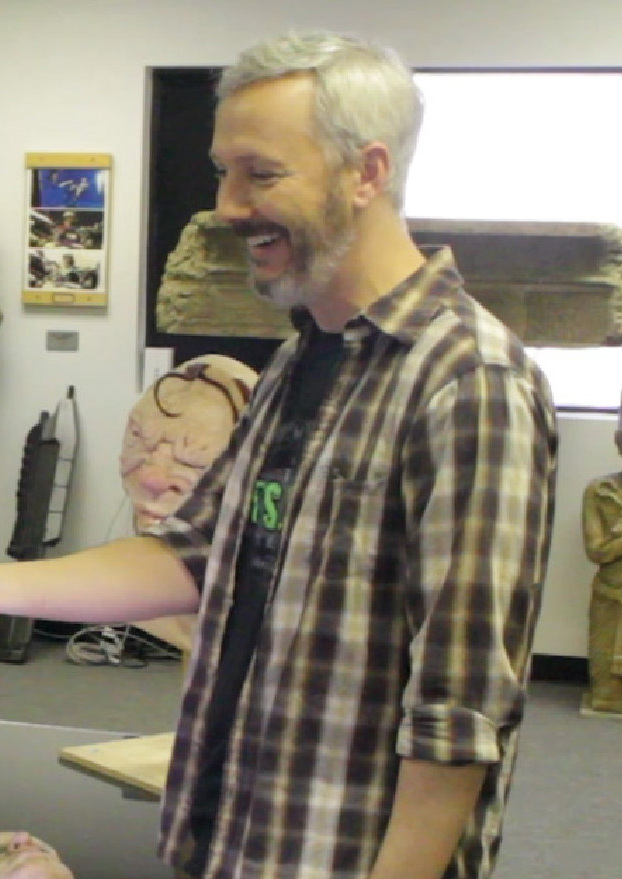
- Winston in the 2016 documentary Traceroute
- Born: Matthew Winston; February 3, 1970 (age 56); Los Angeles, California
- Occupation: Actor
- Father: Stan Winston

Matthew Winston is an American actor. He is the son of special effects artist Stan Winston.

== Career ==
Winston's television appearances include the HBO dramas Six Feet Under and John from Cincinnati, and as Crewman Daniels in Star Trek: Enterprise – central to the Temporal Cold War plot line that runs through the series' four seasons.

== Filmography ==
=== Film appearances ===
- Wes Craven's New Nightmare (1994) as Charles 'Chuck' Wilson
- Mr. October (1996) as Zack
- The Peacemaker (1997) as UN official
- Halloween H20: 20 Years Later (1998) as Detective Matt Sampson
- Fight Club (1999) as Seminary Student
- Passport to Paris (1999) (V) as Jeremy Bluff
- Galaxy Quest (1999) as Technician #1
- Keeping the Faith (2000) as Matt
- Crocodile Dundee in Los Angeles (2001) as Limo Driver
- A.I. Artificial Intelligence (2001) as Executive
- Totally Blonde (2001) as Peon
- About Schmidt (2002) as Gary Nordin
- Deliver Us from Eva (2003) as Oscar
- The Core (2003) as Luke Barry
- Death to the Supermodels (2004) as Gerd
- Kicking & Screaming (2005) as Tom Hanna
- Little Miss Sunshine (2006) as Pageant MC
- Zodiac (2007) as John Allen
- I Now Pronounce You Chuck and Larry (2007) as Glen Aldrich
- Logorama (2009) as Haribo Boy (voice)
- The Boy Who Cried Werewolf (2010) as David Sands
- Starstruck (2010) as Alan Smith
- Harbinger Down (2015) as Stephen
- Traceroute (2016) as Himself

=== Miscellaneous crew ===
- Jurassic Park (1993) as Puppeteer

=== Television guest appearances ===
Year	Title	Role	Notes
1993	Married... with Children	Eugene	Episode: "You Can't Miss"
1998	Chicago Hope	Harold Litvak	Episode: "Liver, Hold the Mushrooms"
1998–2000	Arliss	Jeremy Brenner	4 episodes
1999	Movie Stars	The Director	Episode: "Pilot"
1999	JAG	Ron Katz	Episode: "The Colonel's Wife"
2000	Beverly Hills, 90210	Stuart	Episode: "Ever Heard the One About the Exploding Father?"
2000	Movie Stars	The Director	Episode: "Stand by Me"
2001–2004	Star Trek: Enterprise	Temporal Agent Daniels	8 episodes
2001–2009	Scrubs	Dr. Jeffrey Steadman	5 episodes
2002	Special Unit 2	The Piper	Episode: "The Piper"
2002	That '70s Show	Photographer	Episode: "Leo Loves Kitty"
2002	Yes, Dear	Chief	Episode: "Dances with Couch"
2002	She Spies	Mel Hoover	Episode: "Fondles"
2002	Sabrina the Teenage Witch	Bob	Episode: "Shift Happens"
2003	John Doe	Scout, Samuel Clarkson	3 episodes
2003	CSI: Crime Scene Investigation	Brian Kelso	Episode: "Precious Metal"
2003	Friends	Charity Clerk	Episode: "The One With the Home Study"
2003	NYPD Blue	Marshall Kopek	Episode: "Arrested Development"
2003	Monk	Brian Babbage	Episode: "Mr. Monk and the Sleeping Suspect"
2003–2004	Six Feet Under	Terry	4 episodes
2004	Without a Trace	Steven Pine	Episode: "Life Rules"
2004	Reno 911!	German Acrobat	Episode: "Religion in Reno"
2004	Las Vegas	Walter Dortch	Episode: "The Count of Montecito"
2004	Charmed	Manny	Episode: "Witchness Protection"
2005	7th Heaven	Mitch	Episode: "Paper or Plastic?"
2005	The Suite Life of Zack & Cody	Tim	Episode: "The Fairest of Them All"
2006	Hannah Montana	Fermaine	Episode: "Lilly, Do You Want to Know a Secret?"
2006	NCIS	Rick Carvell	Episode: "Dead and Unburied"
2006	Bones	Nick Martin	Episode: "The Graft in the Girl"
2006	Grey's Anatomy	Frank	Episode: "Staring at the Sun"
2007	John from Cincinnati	Barry Cunningham	10 episodes
2008	Boston Legal	Ryan Chism	Episode: "The Bad Seed"
2009	Pushing Daisies	Michael Brunt	Episode: "Water and Power"
2009	Castle	Evan Hinkle	Episode: "The Double Down"
2009	Chuck	Barclay	Episode: "Chuck Versus the Predator"
2009	Burn Notice	Howard	Episode: "Question & Answer"
2012	Desperate Housewives	Lazaro	2 episodes
2013	Raising Hope	Stu	Episodes: "Yo Zappa Do" (Parts 1 & 2)
