= The Big Goodbye =

- Star Trek: The Next Generation episode
- Episode no.: Season 1 Episode 12
- Directed by: Joseph L. Scanlan
- Written by: Tracy Tormé
- Cinematography by: Edward R. Brown
- Production code: 113
- Original air date: January 11, 1988

Guest appearances
- Lawrence Tierney – Cyrus Redblock; Harvey Jason – Felix Leech; William Boyett – Dan Bell; David Selburg – Whalen; Gary Armagnac – McNary; Mike Genovese – Desk Sergeant; Dick Miller – Vendor; Carolyn Allport – Jessica Bradley; Rhonda Aldrich – Secretary; Erik Cord – Thug

Episode chronology
← Previous "Haven"	Next → "Datalore"
- Star Trek: The Next Generation season 1

"The Big Goodbye" is the twelfth episode of the American science fiction television series Star Trek: The Next Generation. The episode first aired in broadcast syndication on January 11, 1988. This was the second writing credit of the series for Tracy Tormé following the episode "Haven". Rob Bowman planned to direct the episode, but he was switched to "Datalore" due to delays in its production. With Bowman working on another episode, Joseph L. Scanlan became the director.

Set in the 24th century, the series follows the adventures of the Starfleet crew of the Federation starship Enterprise-D. This episode is the first to focus primarily on the holodeck, a technology that can create realistic immersive simulated environments. In the episode, Captain Jean-Luc Picard (Patrick Stewart), Lt. Cmdr. Data (Brent Spiner), and Dr. Beverly Crusher (Gates McFadden) are trapped, due to a computer malfunction, in a 1940s-style gangster holodeck program with Captain Picard playing the role of detective Dixon Hill.

Tormé credited Gene Roddenberry with the idea for the detective novel, and employed a film noir style using references to The Maltese Falcon (1941). Lawrence Tierney, who appeared in film noir movies in the 1940s, guest stars as Cyrus Redblock. The Dixon Hill setting reappeared in two later episodes in the series and in the film Star Trek: First Contact (1996).

Eleven-and-a-half million viewers watched "The Big Goodbye"; critical reception was mixed. One reviewer found it too similar to The Original Series episode "A Piece of the Action". Other reviewers complained about the holodeck but praised Tierney's performance. The episode won an Emmy Award for Outstanding Costumes for a Series and is the only Star Trek episode to ever win the Peabody Award.

== Plot ==
The Enterprise heads to Torona IV to open negotiations with the Jarada, an insect-like race that is unusually strict in matters of protocol. After practicing the complex greeting the Jarada require to open negotiations, Captain Jean-Luc Picard (Patrick Stewart) decides to relax with a Dixon Hill hard-boiled detective story in the holodeck. Playing Detective Hill in the holoprogram, Picard takes up the case of Jessica Bradley (Carolyn Allport), who believes that Cyrus Redblock (Lawrence Tierney) is trying to kill her. Picard decides to continue the program later and leaves the holodeck to affirm their estimated arrival at Torona IV. He invites Dr. Beverly Crusher (Gates McFadden) and visiting historian Dr. Whalen (David Selburg) to join him in the holodeck. While Crusher is still preparing, Picard and Whalen are ready to enter the holodeck when Lt. Cdr. Data (Brent Spiner) arrives, having overheard Picard's invitation. Entering the holodeck, the three discover that Jessica has been murdered in Picard's absence. As Picard explains that he saw Jessica at his office the day before, Lt. Bell (William Boyett) brings Picard into the police station for questioning as a suspect in her murder. Meanwhile, the Enterprise is scanned from a distance by the Jarada, causing a power surge in the holodeck external controls. Dr. Crusher later enters the holodeck, first experiencing a momentary glitch with the holodeck doors, and joins her friends at the police station.

The Jarada demand their greeting earlier than the agreed time and are insulted at having to talk to anyone other than the Captain. The crew tries to communicate with Picard in the holodeck but finds it impossible; the Jarada signal has affected the holodeck's functions, preventing the doors from opening or allowing communication with the crew inside. Lt. Geordi La Forge (LeVar Burton) and Wesley Crusher (Wil Wheaton) attempt to repair the holodeck systems. While inside the holodeck, the group returns to Dixon's office. Mr. Leech (Harvey Jason) appears, having waited for Picard, demanding he turn over an object he believes Jessica gave him. When Picard fails to understand, Leech shoots Dr. Whalen with a gun, and the crew discovers that the safety protocols have been disabled, as Whalen is severely wounded. As Dr. Crusher cares for his wound, Picard and Data discover that the holodeck is malfunctioning, and they are unable to exit the program. Mr. Leech is joined by Redblock and continues to demand the object. Hill's friend Lt. McNary arrives and becomes involved in the standoff. Picard tries to explain the nature of the holodeck, but Redblock refuses to believe him.

Outside, Wesley finds the glitch, however he cannot simply turn off the system for fear of losing everyone inside. Instead, Wesley resets the simulation, briefly placing Picard and the others in the middle of a snowstorm before finding themselves back in Dixon's office. With the reset successfully clearing the malfunction, the exit doors finally appear. Despite Picard's warnings, Redblock and Leech exit the holodeck, but dissipate as they move beyond the range of its holoemitters. As they leave the holodeck, Picard thanks McNary, who now suspects that his world is artificial and asks whether Picard's departure is "the big goodbye", to which Picard replies that he does not know. Picard reaches the bridge in time to give the proper greeting to the Jarada. The Jarada accept the greeting, heralding the start of successful negotiations.

== Production ==
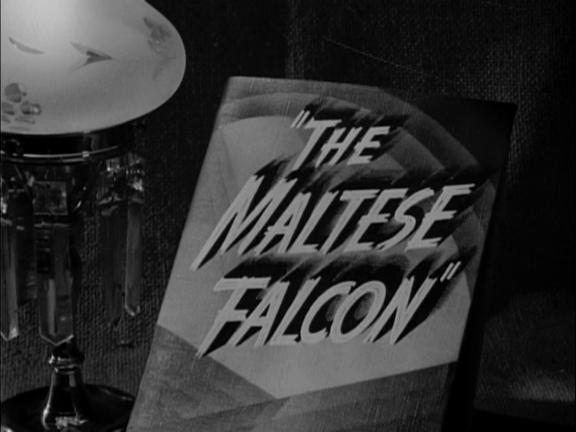
References were deliberately included in "The Big Goodbye" to the 1941 film The Maltese Falcon.

The initial idea for Picard's detective based holodeck program came from series creator Gene Roddenberry and other writing staff. Tracy Tormé received credit for writing the episode. Tormé said he added film noir elements, including references to The Maltese Falcon (1941). Redblock and Leech represent the characters played by Sydney Greenstreet and Peter Lorre. The production staff attempted to create the same layout of the detective office from the film. Dixon Hill was originally named Dixon Steele in reference to In a Lonely Place (1950), a film noir starring Humphrey Bogart. However, the name was changed due to similarities with the name of the title character in the American television series Remington Steele. The episode's name is itself a reference to two works by detective fiction writer Raymond Chandler, The Big Sleep and The Long Goodbye. Tormé expanded the Jarada a great deal, but because of budgetary restraints they are only heard in the episode. After the episode "Haven", "The Big Goodbye" is the second writing credit of the series for Tormé. Rob Bowman was originally scheduled to direct the episode, but following problems with "Datalore" the filming order was switched, so Joe Scanlan directed "The Big Goodbye" instead.

Scanlan and Tormé recommended filming the holodeck sequences in black and white, but Rick Berman and Bob Justman disagreed with the idea. (Note: The Captain Proton holodeck program in Star Trek: Voyager was filmed in black and white from the episode "Night" onwards.) "The Big Goodbye" was the first episode based on the holodeck in the Star Trek franchise. The holodeck would appear later in the season in "11001001", as well as a number of other episodes in various series, and would eventually become a regular feature. Because of the differences between the Dixon Hill scenes and those set on the Enterprise, Scanlan treated the diverse settings as if he were filming two unconnected episodes.

Tierney was well known for playing villains in 1940s film noirs, including Dillinger (1945) and The Devil Thumbs a Ride (1947). After his performance in Star Trek: The Next Generation, Tierney gained new fame playing Joe Cabot in Quentin Tarantino's film Reservoir Dogs (1992). Wheaton later recalled he felt intimidated by Tierney during filming, as he was 15 and Tierney had a reputation for having a character similar to the tough guys he typically played. Tierney returned to Star Trek in 1997 to play an alien Regent in the Deep Space Nine episode, "Business as Usual". Wheaton said that after 12 previous episodes in the series at the time, he and the cast and crew preferred "The Big Goodbye" as it allowed them to play a period piece. The Dixon Hill holoprogram reappeared in the second season episode "Manhunt", the fourth-season episode "Clues", and the film Star Trek: First Contact (1996). The Dixon Hill characters are also featured in the licensed novel A Hard Rain.

== Awards ==
Rather than give in to the usual realities of "first-run" and produce a low budget, but profitable program, the producers chose instead to opt for the highest quality in writing, decor, acting, and, indeed, all facets of the production. In doing so, they have set a new standard of quality for first-run syndication and this is exemplified in the episode "The Big Goodbye."

— The Peabody Board.

In recognition of its "new standard of quality for first-run syndication", the episode was honored with a Peabody Award in 1987. "The Big Goodbye" was also nominated for two Emmy Awards in the categories of Outstanding Cinematography for a Series and Outstanding Costumes for a Series, with costume designer William Ware Theiss winning the award in the latter category.

== Reception ==
The episode first aired on January 11, 1988, receiving Nielsen ratings of 11.5 million. It was the first new episode broadcast since the previous November, when 10.3 million viewers watched "Haven". "The Big Goodbye" received more viewers than the following episode "Datalore", which also had only 10.3 million viewers.

After its initial release, a review in TV Guide criticised the episode for its similarity to The Original Series episode "A Piece of the Action", which featured a planet based on 1930s gangland Chicago. Several reviewers re-watched the episode after the end of the series. Keith DeCandido of Tor.com praised the "stellar guest casting" and said that Tierney "own[ed] the episode". He compared the episode to The Maltese Falcon and said that the episode featured "charming performances" by the entire cast. DeCandido gave the episode a score of seven out of ten. Cast member Wil Wheaton called the episode a "fantastic collaborative effort, from Tracy Tormé's script, to Joseph Scanlan's direction, to Ed Brown's cinematography, to every actor's performance. There's a reason 'The Big Goodbye' is the only Star Trek episode to win a Peabody." He gave the episode an A grade.

Writing for Den of Geek in 2012, James Hunt said that the risk of disintegration on the holodeck was "insane" and was rectified in later episodes. He thought that the episode stood out from the others in the first season due to the prototype holodeck story. "The holodeck will break again and again over the years, but rarely in a way any more interesting than this. Not that The Big Goodbye was particularly interesting, but it has the rare fortune of being first," Hunt wrote.

Michelle Erica Green of TrekNation praised the dialogue but felt the episode did not "hold up to a lot of logical analysis". She also said it was a "fun" episode that "set the stage" for holodeck episodes featuring the sentient Professor Moriarty hologram in "Elementary, Dear Data" and "Ship in a Bottle". Writing for The A.V. Club, Zack Handlen observed "a certain flatness" in parts of the episode and considered it "very silly" for the characters to slowly disintegrate after leaving the holodeck. Although he said the holodeck in "The Big Goodbye" was similar to "an Xbox that periodically eats your cat", he gave the episode an overall grade of B−.

In 2016, Syfy ranked this the 7th best holodeck episode of the Star Trek franchise.

In 2017, Den of Geek listed "The Big Goodbye" as one of the top ten ground-breaking episodes of Star Trek: The Next Generation, noting how it was the first 'holodeck episode' on the show and "set the precedent"; it "established how the holodeck could be used to liven up the show and expand its horizons." They note its influence on later holodeck episodes such as "Ship in a Bottle" and "Hollow Pursuits".

In 2019, CBR ranked this the 11th best holodeck-themed episode of all Star Trek franchise episodes up to that time. In 2019, Den of Geek recommended rewatching this episode as background for Star Trek: Picard.

In 2020, Looper listed this one of the best episodes for Jean Luc Picard.

== Media releases ==
"The Big Goodbye" was released on VHS cassette in the United States and Canada on August 26, 1992. The episode was released on the Star Trek: The Next Generation season one DVD box set in March 2002. The season one Blu-ray set was released on July 24, 2012.
