= Q Who =

- Star Trek: The Next Generation episode
- Episode no.: Season 2 Episode 16
- Directed by: Rob Bowman
- Written by: Maurice Hurley
- Cinematography by: Edward R. Brown
- Production code: 142
- Original air date: May 8, 1989

Guest appearances
- John de Lancie – Q; Lycia Naff – Ens. Sonya Gomez; Colm Meaney – Miles O'Brien; Whoopi Goldberg – Guinan

Episode chronology
← Previous "Pen Pals"	Next → "Samaritan Snare"
- Star Trek: The Next Generation season 2

"Q Who" is the 16th episode of the second season of the American science fiction television series Star Trek: The Next Generation. The episode first aired in broadcast syndication on May 5, 1989. It was written by executive producer Maurice Hurley and directed by Rob Bowman. "Q Who" marked the first appearance of the Borg, who were designed by Hurley and originally intended to appear in the first season episode "The Neutral Zone".

Set in the 24th century, the series follows the adventures of the Starfleet crew of the Federation starship Enterprise-D. In this episode, the almost-omnipotent entity known as "Q" (John de Lancie) arrives on the Enterprise and decides that Captain Jean-Luc Picard (Patrick Stewart) is ignorant and overconfident. Q then sends the ship across the galaxy where the crew make first contact with the cybernetically enhanced assimilating race known as the Borg. After first trying to make peace and then trying to destroy the Borg ship, and failing at both, Picard is forced to beg for Q's help.

Costume designs were created by Dorinda Wood, while Michael Westmore developed the prosthetics worn on the actor's heads. The designs were reminiscent of creations of H. R. Giger and the character Lord Dread from the television series Captain Power and the Soldiers of the Future. The episode went over budget and nearly required additional filming time. "Q Who" was watched by 10.3 million viewers. The critical reception has been positive, with the episode described as the first "great episode" of the series. It was nominated for three Emmy Awards, winning two.

== Plot ==
On his way back to his quarters, Captain Jean-Luc Picard (Patrick Stewart) steps off a turbolift and instead of finding himself in a corridor onboard the Enterprise, ends up on board a shuttlecraft with Q (John de Lancie) at the controls. Picard demands to be returned to the Enterprise; Q calls him "an impossibly stubborn human" and refuses to take him back until he agrees to at least hear Q's requests. Q then transports them to Ten Forward, where Guinan (Whoopi Goldberg), who recognizes him, warns Picard not to trust him. Q reveals that he wants to join the crew to assist them as they push further into unexplored regions of the galaxy, asserting they are not ready for the threats they will encounter. Picard chooses to make their own way into the unknown, and rejects Q's offer. Irritated by Picard's arrogance, Q sends the Enterprise thousands of light years across the galaxy, then disappears. Lt. Commander Data (Brent Spiner) reports that the nearest starbase is over two years away at maximum warp. A fearful Guinan warns Picard to set course for home immediately, but Picard is curious to explore.

The crew discover a nearby planet that shows signs of a previous civilization but has been stripped of all industrial and mechanical elements, similar to destruction found several months ago at Federation outposts bordering the Romulan Neutral Zone. Moments later, they detect and are then met by a large, cube-shaped vessel which does not answer their hails. Guinan warns Picard that the ship belongs to the Borg, a powerful, cyborg-like race that nearly wiped out her people, scattering the survivors across the galaxy, and again urges Picard to leave immediately or face certain destruction. Though Picard orders the Enterprise's shields raised, a single, speechless Borg transports into Engineering and begins to probe the Enterprise's computer systems. Lt. Worf (Michael Dorn) initially attempts to incapacitate the intruder with his phaser set on stun, which has no effect. Worf is forced to use the kill setting in order to neutralize the Borg. Immediately afterwards, a second Borg appears and continues probing the computer, now proving to be completely immune to phaser fire. Completing its mission, it strips several components from the dead Borg, then transports itself and the dead Borg away. The Borg ship contacts the Enterprise and demands their surrender. The Borg then immobilizes the Enterprise with a tractor beam, disables the shields, and uses a cutting beam to slice into the saucer section to remove a cross-section of the ship, killing eighteen people.

Picard orders return fire, and the Enterprise apparently disables the Borg ship. Against Guinan's advice, Commander William Riker (Jonathan Frakes) takes an away team to the immense Borg cube where they find mostly dormant Borg drones and a Borg nursery. Data discovers that the Borg ship is regenerating and repairing the damage made by the Enterprise. The away team is beamed directly to the bridge, and Picard orders that they depart at Warp 8. The Borg ship suddenly reactivates and begins pursuit, gaining on the Enterprise. Picard attempts to outrun the Borg by ordering Lt. Commander La Forge (LeVar Burton) to engage maximum warp, but the Borg are able to keep up. Q appears on the bridge and warns Picard that the Borg will never stop chasing them, and cannot be defeated. Picard attempts to fight back against the Borg to no avail, and finally admits he needs Q's help. Q obliges, safely returning the Enterprise to its last position in Federation space. Picard, though thankful for Q's lesson, blames Q for the deaths of his crew. Q disappears, but not before reminding them again of their ill-preparedness. Guinan warns Picard that now that the Borg are aware of the Federation's presence, they will be coming. Picard reflects that perhaps Q did the right thing for the wrong reasons by bringing forward their encounter with the Borg, as it has informed the Federation what lies ahead of them as they continue to explore.

== Production ==
The episode featured the third appearance of de Lancie as Q after "Encounter at Farpoint" and "Hide and Q", the latter of which had been written by Hurley under a pseudonym. Lycia Naff was introduced as the overeager young ensign Sonya Gomez, who was intended to be a recurring character in the same manner as Chief Miles O'Brien played by Colm Meaney (who also appeared in this episode). However, Naff made just one more appearance as Gomez, in the following episode, although the character later appeared in the Starfleet Corps of Engineers series of novellas and, as a captain, in Star Trek: Lower Decks.

"Q Who" went $50,000 over budget and at one point had an eighth day of shooting arranged, although this was subsequently canceled. The overspending on this episode and "Elementary, Dear Data" resulted in the budget-saving production of the clip show "Shades of Gray". Director Rob Bowman was concerned with "Q Who" for a while, saying that "we didn't know day to day if we were making a stinker or a winner".

=== The Borg ===
Gene Roddenberry was keen not to re-use aliens from The Original Series, and so the Ferengi were developed to be the main villains for The Next Generation. After the new aliens' first few appearances, it was decided that they were too comical to suit such a role, and instead the production team began looking for a new adversary for Starfleet. Writer and co-executive producer Maurice Hurley developed the idea of an insectoid race with a shared hive consciousness. This idea would become the cybernetic Borg due to budget constraints, with the idea of a hive mind remaining. The new race would go on to appear in five further episodes of The Next Generation, as well as the film Star Trek: First Contact. The Borg also appeared in the pilot of Star Trek: Deep Space Nine, the Star Trek: Enterprise episode "Regeneration," and repeatedly in Star Trek: Voyager from the middle of season three onwards.

It had been originally planned to include the Borg in the first season episode "The Neutral Zone", but due to the 1988 Writers Guild of America strike, the time to write the script was cut short. Hurley developed the episode over a day and a half with the Borg elements directly removed. The episode was originally conceived as having two parts, with the Romulans and Federation teaming up in the second part, but that plan was subsequently dropped. This plot may have been linked to the aliens seen in "Conspiracy". "The Neutral Zone" instead simply made reference to the destruction of a series of outposts by an unknown enemy.

The design of the Borg was reminiscent of Lord Dread from the television series Captain Power and the Soldiers of the Future and the designs of H. R. Giger. The first designs for the new race were created by costume designer Dorinda Wood after she received the script to "Q Who". While her design showed a suit with tubes running in and out of it, she left the head design up to make-up supervisor Michael Westmore. The headpieces and the main costumes were made at the same time by the two different departments, with Wood and Westmore working together at times to ensure that they matched. The base of the head pieces was made from foam, and while Westmore initially made casts of model kits using polyurethane for the electronic parts, he found it more effective to use actual electronics from damaged equipment. He designed a latex attachment to allow for tubes to be attached to skin so that there was not a great deal of bare skin left on the actors' bodies. That skin was covered in a white base make-up in order to achieve a zombie-like appearance.

== Awards and nominations ==
The episode was nominated for three Emmy Awards in 1989, winning two for Outstanding Sound Editing for a Series and Outstanding Sound Mixing for a Drama Series. It was nominated for, but failed to win for Outstanding Special Visual Effects, with the award going to the miniseries War and Remembrance instead.

== Reception ==
I love the moment when a good show becomes great. I love feeling all your investment and increasingly desperate optimism suddenly pay off. We've had good TNG episodes before this, but "Q Who?" goes that one extra step, and finally, finally takes the show out from behind TOS's shadow once and for all... before now, it was possible to legitimately question if TNG could ever stand on its own feet. That is no longer an issue.

— Zack Handlen, The A.V. Club, July 8, 2010

"Q Who" was first shown on May 5, 1989, in broadcast syndication within the United States. It was watched by 10.3 million viewers, making it the most watched episode since "The Royale" four episodes earlier in the season. "Q Who" was watched by more viewers than any other episode for the rest of season two and the first five episodes of season three.

Several reviewers re-watched the episode following the end of the series. Keith DeCandido reviewed "Q Who" for Tor.com in 2011, describing it as "one of the best hours of TNG". He called de Lancie's performance a "triumphant return", said that Goldberg brought "mystery and depth" to her role and that Stewart "just kills" as Picard. He said that the introduction of the Borg was "phenomenal", and gave the episode a score of ten out of ten. Zack Handlen, writing for The A.V. Club said that the plot was "brilliant" because Q was proved right. He thought that had the crew been able to come to some sort of solution then it would have been a "strong" episode, but because Picard is forced to plead with Q, it made it the first "great episode" of the series because "it admits that these humans... can be arrogant, and weak, and that they can be bested". He gave the episode an "A" grade.

SFX described the episode as "thrilling" in their review of the season two Blu-ray release, while IGN referred to it as a "classic". In a list of the great episodes of The Next Generation created by Juliette Harrison in 2012 for Den of Geek, "Q Who" was listed fifth – the earliest episode of the series to be featured in the list.

Benjamin Ahr Harrison of The Greatest Generation podcast described the set design of the interior of the Borg cube as: "If H. R. Giger had gone to work for, like, Black & Decker and designed a microwave, this is sort of what it would have looked like."

"Q Who" was rated the 16th best episode of all Star Trek television up to 2016, in a ranking by The Hollywood Reporter. In 2015, they ranked the presentation of the fictional Borg cube spacecraft as one of the top ten "most stunning" moments of this television series.

The Borg cube, which made its debut in this episode was rated as the 2nd best spacecraft of Star Trek by Space.com in 2017.

In 2017, Netflix announced that "Q Who" was one of four Star Trek: The Next Generation episodes (Note: Star Trek: The Next Generation was also represented on the list by "Clues", and both episodes in the two-part "The Best of Both Worlds". When compiling its top ten list, Netflix purposely excluded the series premiere and second episode from each of the then-six series in the franchise, in order to "seek data beyond default behavior".) in the top ten most re-watched Star Trek franchise episodes on its streaming service, based on data since the franchise was added to Netflix in 2011.

In 2018, Tom's Guide rated "Q Who" one of the 15 best episodes featuring Captain Picard.

In 2020, CBR ranked this episode the 2nd best featuring Q, suggesting it was one of the most influential episodes of the franchise. That same year they also ranked "Q Who" the 8th best episode of Star Trek: The Next Generation.

In 2021, Nerdist said this was one of the top ten Star Trek episodes with first alien contact, pointing the introduction of the deadly Borg cybernetic aliens by a playfully malicious Q.

In 2021 ScreenRant said it was the second best Borg episode based on an IMDB rating of 9.0 out of 10 at that time, behind "Best of Both Worlds" which had rating of 9.4 out of 10.

In 2021, Rolling Stone magazine said that "Q Who" was an "incredible" episode from season 2 of the series, noting how Q introduces the Borg.

In 2021, Tom's Guide said this was a "chilling introduction" to the Borg, and the second best episode for the character Q.

== Watch guides ==
The Nerdist suggested this episode as the starting point for a story arc of this TV show. They propose a story arc with the Enterprise 1701-D confronting the Borg, that would include Q Who, Best of Both Worlds, I, Borg, and Descent.

In 2020, IGN recommended watching "Q Who" as background for another Star Trek universe show, Star Trek: Picard.

== Home media and cinematic release ==
The first home media release of "Q Who" was on VHS cassette, appearing on October 12, 1994, in the United States and Canada. The episode has been included in three DVD box sets. The first was the Season Two set, released on May 7, 2002, and subsequently as part of the Star Trek: Fan Collective – Borg on March 7, 2006 and Star Trek: Fan Collective – Q on June 6, 2006. The most recent release was as part of the Season Two Blu-ray set on December 4, 2012. That release included an audio commentary for the episode featuring Rob Bowman, Dan Curry and Michael and Denise Okuda. "Q Who" received a cinematic release alongside an extended version of "The Measure of a Man" for one night on November 29, 2012, to promote the Blu-ray release. This was the second time that a pair of The Next Generation episodes received a cinematic release to promote the release of a Blu-ray season box set.

This episode was released in the "Q Continuum" collection of LaserDisc. The collection was released on July 30, 1997 and was published by Paramount Home Video; it retailed for 100 USD. The set included the 2-part "Encounter at Farpoint", "Hide & Q", "Q Who?", and "Deja Q" on 12 inch optical discs in NTSC format with a total runtime of 230 minutes. The collection came in a Tri-Fold jacket that also included a letter from actor John De Lancie.

== Bibliography ==
- Gross, Edward; Altman, Mark A. (1993). Captain's Logs: The Complete Trek Voyages. London: Boxtree. ISBN 978-1-85283-899-7.
- Nemecek, Larry (2003). Star Trek: The Next Generation Companion (3rd ed.). New York: Pocket Books. ISBN 0-7434-5798-6.
- Reeves-Stevens, Judith; Reeves-Stevens, Garfield (1998). Star Trek: The Next Generation: The Continuing Mission (2nd ed.). New York: Pocket Books. ISBN 978-0671025595.
- Westmore, Michael G; Nazzaro, Joe (1993). Star Trek: The Next Generation Make-Up FX Journal. London: Titan. ISBN 978-1-85286-491-0.
