= The Measure of a Man (Star Trek: The Next Generation) =

- Star Trek: The Next Generation episode
- Episode no.: Season 2 Episode 9
- Directed by: Robert Scheerer
- Written by: Melinda M. Snodgrass
- Cinematography by: Edward R. Brown
- Production code: 135
- Original air date: February 13, 1989

Guest appearances
- Amanda McBroom – Captain Phillipa Louvois; Clyde Kusatsu – Admiral Nakamura; Brian Brophy – Commander Bruce Maddox; Whoopi Goldberg – Guinan; Colm Meaney – Miles O'Brien

Episode chronology
← Previous "A Matter of Honor"	Next → "The Dauphin"
- Star Trek: The Next Generation season 2

"The Measure of a Man" is the ninth episode of the second season of the American science-fiction television series Star Trek: The Next Generation, the 35th episode overall. It was originally released on February 13, 1989, in broadcast syndication. It was written as a speculative script by former attorney and Star Trek: The Original Series novelist Melinda M. Snodgrass. It was directed by Robert Scheerer.

Set in the 24th century, the series follows the adventures of the Starfleet crew of the Federation starship Enterprise-D. In this episode, the rights of the android officer Lt. Commander Data (Brent Spiner) are threatened by a scientist who wishes to dismantle him to produce replicas of him. Captain Jean-Luc Picard (Patrick Stewart) fights in a Starfleet court for Data's right of self-determination, not to be declared mere property of Starfleet, while Commander William Riker (Jonathan Frakes) is obliged to argue on behalf of the scientist.

The script was accepted due to the impact of the 1988 Writers Guild of America strike, and resulted in Snodgrass being recruited as a staff writer and script editor. She would remain on the staff until the end of the third season. "The Measure of a Man" has been seen as highlighting themes of slavery and the rights of artificial intelligence. Similar subjects were discussed in a follow-up episode, "The Offspring". "The Measure of a Man" received Nielsen ratings of 11.3% on the first broadcast. It was received positively by the cast and crew because of the subject and has been considered by critics to be the first great episode of The Next Generation. It has also been included in lists of the best and most groundbreaking episodes of the series. An extended cut was released in 2012, with 12 additional minutes of footage.

== Plot ==
While the Enterprise is visiting Starbase 173 for routine maintenance, cyberneticist Commander Bruce Maddox (Brian Brophy) comes aboard to pay a visit to Lt. Commander Data (Brent Spiner), wishing to better understand Data's positronic brain. It quickly becomes clear that Maddox has an ulterior motive of transferring the contents of Data's memory to the starbase mainframe computer and shutting down and dismantling him to learn how to recreate the technology. Though Maddox promises to restore Data following his analysis and assures him his memories will be intact, Data is concerned that the procedure is riskier than Maddox is letting on, and argues that while the factual details of his memories will be preserved, the nuances of his experiences may not be. Data refuses, causing Maddox to turn to Starfleet to order him to comply. Captain Picard (Patrick Stewart) supports Data's position and is advised that the only way for Data to evade the order is to resign from Starfleet, which Data does. Maddox argues that Data is Starfleet property, not a sentient being, and as such, does not have the right to choose to resign.

Picard has to deal with the presiding judge advocate general for the sector, Captain Philippa Louvois (Amanda McBroom), who was a former love interest until she aggressively prosecuted Picard in a court-martial involving his actions on the USS Stargazer. When Louvois rules for Maddox, Picard requests a formal hearing to challenge the ruling. Louvois agrees and allows Picard to represent Data during the proceedings. Due to a shortage of qualified legal staff, Louvois compels Commander William Riker (Jonathan Frakes) to represent Maddox. Riker's arguments portray Data as merely a machine constructed by man and no more than the sum of his parts. In a striking final demonstration, Riker activates Data's "off switch", causing the android to shut down. Picard calls for a recess, during which he meets in Ten Forward with Guinan (Whoopi Goldberg), who suggests that regardless of whether Data is a machine or not, Maddox's plans for reproducing him would lead to a situation tantamount to slavery. Picard uses this to defuse Riker's arguments, and turns the discussion to metaphysical matters of Data's sentience, using Data and Maddox as witnesses. Picard points out that Data meets two of the three criteria that Maddox uses to define sentient life. Data is intelligent and self-aware, and Picard asks anyone in the court to show a means of measuring consciousness.

With no one able to answer this, Louvois acknowledges that neither she nor anyone else can measure this in Data, and rules that he has the right to choose. Upon the court's ruling, Data formally refuses to undergo the procedure. After the hearing, Data clearly holds no ill will against Maddox; Data reminds the scientist that his work remains intriguing and offers to assist in further research after Maddox has had more time to study and perfect his techniques. Maddox, for his part, refers to Data for the first time as "he" rather than "it". Later, during a party celebrating Data's victory, Data finds Riker alone in a conference room, ashamed of having had to argue against his friend in the hearing. Data cheers him up by telling him that his action was an act of self-sacrifice that gave Data the chance to win his freedom, as had Riker refused to participate, Louvois' original judgement in favor of Maddox would have been final. The two then happily return to the celebration together.

== Production ==
=== Writing ===
The episode was the television debut for writer Melinda M. Snodgrass. She had previously been an attorney at a law practice, but she quit the position, and a friend suggested that she become a writer. She wrote an outline of a Star Trek: The Original Series novel for Pocket Books, which was purchased and became The Tears of the Singers. She also acted as a co-writer for the Wild Cards anthology and subsequent books, alongside George R. R. Martin. Snodgrass submitted a speculative script to Paramount Television for "The Measure of a Man" for Star Trek: The Next Generation. As a result of the 1988 Writers Guild of America strike, the studio was looking for more scripts of this type, so it was accepted.

She said that although most watchers perceived the episode as being Data-centric, Snodgrass felt that it focused on the actions of Picard and referred to Data as the catalyst for the plot. Following her work on this episode, Snodgrass was recruited as a staff writer and story editor with Leonard Mlodinow and Scott Rubenstein. When, four episodes later, the other two editors left the series, Snodgrass ended up being the only one on staff for the remainder of the season. She was promoted to executive script consultant for the third season, but left the staff after the end of that year.

"The Measure of a Man" features several references to events in previous episodes, such as the discussion of Data's relationship with Tasha Yar, previously alluded to in "The Naked Now" and the revelation of Data's off switch in "Datalore". This is also the first episode to have a scene of the crew's poker game, which continued to feature throughout the series and was the final scene of the series finale, "All Good Things...".

=== Guest stars ===
Guest stars included Brian Brophy, who had previously appeared as Traker in the science-fiction television series Max Headroom. His character, Bruce Maddox, was later mentioned in The Next Generation episode "Data's Day" as continuing to correspond with Data. Bruce Maddox later appeared in Star Trek: Picard played by John Ales. Amanda McBroom played Captain Phillipa Louvois and was a fan of Star Trek, well known for appearances on Broadway, several television series, and from winning the Golden Globe Award for Best Original Song in 1980 for "The Rose" from the film of the same name. Louvois later appeared in the noncanonical novel Articles of the Federation. Clyde Kusatsu appeared as Admiral Nakamura and would later appear in "Phantasms" and The Next Generation series finale. The character has since also appeared in several pieces of noncanonical fiction. Though uncredited, Denise Crosby makes a cameo as Tasha Yar in a holographic projection.

=== Special effects and sets ===
The episode includes special-effect shots in space of the fictional spacecraft and space stations. The exterior shot of "Starbase 173" used a miniature model previously made for Star Trek: The Motion Picture and reused in Star Trek II: The Wrath of Khan. The set for the courtroom aboard the station was actually a redress of the Enterprise D's battle bridge set. This set was previously used in such episodes as "Conspiracy" and was used in several episodes in the series.

== Themes and influence ==
"The Measure of a Man" has been given as an example of the complexity and depth of Star Trek. Its subject matter ranges from the rights of artificial lifeforms to slavery. In the wake of discussions regarding the ethical dilemmas of computer scientists, the episode also received attention among academia. It was used as lecture material in a course on computer ethics at the University of Kentucky, in a section covering robot and cyborg rights. The idea of non-human ethics had been discussed prior to "The Measure of a Man" in papers and books such as Animal Liberation: a New Ethics for our Treatment of Animals by Peter Singer in 1977.

In the essay "The 'Measure of a Man' and the Ethos of Hospitality: Towards an Ethical Dwelling with Technology" within the AI & Society journal in 2009, Lucas D. Introna explained that Data's main issue in this episode was that this area of ethics is dealt with purely in human terms. Thus, the argument regarding his rights as an individual must be framed within those boundaries. The episode was also analyzed in a Toledo Law Journal article by Paul Joseph and Sharon Carton about the legal system of the Federation as portrayed in Star Trek: The Next Generation.

The episode proved influential, with the test established in "The Measure of a Man" being revisited when Data created Lal in "The Offspring". Picard directly references the events of this episode as it appears that the outcome of "The Measure of a Man" had only been applied to Data and not all androids. Outside of the series, Star Trek fan Seth MacFarlane referenced the events of "The Measure of a Man" in his comedy film Ted 2 (2015). In the film, an attorney must argue for the rights of Ted, a sentient Teddy Bear, as he is at risk of being considered property rather than a person in the eyes of the law.

Bruce Maddox appeared again in Star Trek: Picard. In this story, he continued his research into cybernetics, building the androids Dahj and Soji, among others.

== Reception ==
=== Broadcast ===
"The Measure of a Man" was first shown on February 13, 1989, in broadcast syndication. It was the ninth episode of the second season and received Nielsen ratings of 11.3% on the first broadcast. It was one of the best-rated episodes during the second season, alongside the previous episode, "A Matter of Honor", which were the highest since "The Big Goodbye" released in syndication during the week of February 14, 1988.

=== Critical reception ===
Entertainment Weekly said that "It is well-established Trek gospel that the first truly great episode of Star Trek: The Next Generation is 'The Measure of a Man'". James Van Hise and Hal Schuster in The Complete Trek: The Next Generation described it as a "stirring episode" that showed that the Enterprise did not need to be endangered to generate drama. They said overall that "The Measure of a Man" was "pure Next Generation at its best". Wendy Rathbone provided a guest review in the same book, saying that she enjoyed the believability of the plot and the characterization of Data. She compared it to The Original Series episode "Court Martial", and called it "riveting" with "first rate dialogue and powerful tension." Following the end of the series in 1994, "The Measure of a Man" was given an honorable mention in a list of the best episodes by television critic Mike Antonucci for the San Jose Mercury News. In a dissenting note, Mark Jones and Lance Parkin, in their book Beyond the Final Frontier: An Unauthorised Review of Star Trek, called "The Measure of a Man" "a blunt episode lacking finesse". They added that while including Riker in the plot was a positive move, it was not clearly rationalized. They described the argument at the center of the episode as a "balloon debate".

Zack Handlen graded the episode an A− for The A.V. Club. He praised the actions of Picard, but thought that Diana Muldaur as Katherine Pulaski could have been featured more. He disliked the "shoehorning" of Riker into the plot, and felt that Guinan's comparison to slavery was not required and there were some "soft arguments" in the court scenes. Nonetheless, Handlen said that the episode featured "the sort of profound philosophizing that Trek has always made its bread and butter", and that "TNG hasn't lost its flaws, but it's finally, definitively shown that it can be great". Keith DeCandido rated "The Measure of a Man" nine out of ten in his review for Tor.com. He praised the guest actors, and called the episode "Quite simply one of Trek‘s finest hours." He said that the procedures in the courtroom scenes were an issue, as the witnesses were not cross examined and Riker did not make a closing statement. In his Den of Geek review, James Hunt expressed surprise the arguments presented in "The Measure of a Man" had not been raised earlier in Data's Starfleet career. He felt it was "the first episode of TNG that doesn't just reach the potential of Star Trek, it stretches far, far beyond it". He called it "a solid contender for the best TNG episode full stop", recommended "If you only watch one episode of TNG, it might be a good idea to make it this one."

In 2017 Space.com rated "The Measure of a Man" as the #1 Star Trek episode overall out of its seven hundred plus episodes. In 2013 IGN ranked this the 8th best episode of all Star Trek series. The Washington Post also ranked it 8th best, noting that it made full use of Patrick Stewart's acting abilities with a space court case about the android Data and sentience. Screen Rant ranked it as one of the top ten episodes of all Star Trek to-date. Radio Times ranked the space-court room sequence as the 17th best moment in all Star Trek, remarking "The franchise is at its philosophizing best as we see a grim-faced Riker prosecute the case while Picard champions Data’s self-awareness". Vox rated it one of the top 25 essential episodes of all Star Trek. The episode was ranked as the 70th best out of the 700 plus episodes in the Star Trek franchise by Charlie Jane Anders for io9. She said that the trial raised "fascinating questions", but the best part of the episode was "Riker's total ruthlessness as prosecutor". Forbes noted it as one of the top ten episodes of the franchise that explores the implications of advanced technology.

Nerdist ranked this episode the number one best episode of Star Trek: The Next Generation, on a list of the top ten episodes. Entertainment Weekly named it the sixth best of the series. The Digital Fix also said it was the sixth best episode of the series. Juliette Harrisson ranked it as the 8th most groundbreaking episode of the series. Screen Rant ranked "The Measure of a Man" the tenth best episode of Star Trek: The Next Generation. The Hollywood Reporter ranked it among the top 25 episodes of the show, while Den of Geek included it among the show's top 25 "must watch" episodes. Wired magazine said this was one of the best episodes of Star Trek: The Next Generation.

Regarding the character Captain Picard, SciFiPulse.net ranked this episode one of the top seven about Picard. Space.com recommended watching this episode as background for Star Trek: Picard. Vulture recommended it as one of the best Star Trek episodes to watch along with Star Trek: Picard, noting the performance of Brian Brophy as Commander Maddox, and commending Picard's defense.

=== Cast and crew reception ===
Director Robert Scheerer called it his favorite show, adding that it was interesting to see Riker and Picard treating Data "not as a dear friend, but as someone whose worth has to be resolved". He said that the episode was non-typical and "beautifully crafted", with "a great deal to say about man, humanity, what our problems in the world are today and hopefully what we can do about it in the future." Producer Maurice Hurley called the episode "stunning", saying "That's the kind of show you want to do", "it just worked great, everything about it". He also lauded Whoopi Goldberg's role in the episode. Michael Piller, who had not yet joined the crew later described it as one of his three favourite episodes alongside "The Inner Light" and "The Offspring" as "they had remarkable emotional impacts. And they genuinely explored the human condition, which this franchise does better than any other when it does it well."

Spiner identified this episode as his favorite episode of The Next Generation. In an interview, Stewart concurred that this is "the first truly great episode of the series" and added that it went to the "heart of the fundamentals of the Star Trek philosophy and what Gene Roddenberry had been writing about in different ways from the mid 60s." He said that his favourite episode was "The Inner Light". On Twitter in April 2013, Marina Sirtis (Troi) named this as her favorite episode.

== Home media release ==
The first home media release of "The Measure of the Man" was on VHS cassette, appearing on October 12, 1994, in the United States and Canada. The episode has been included in the season two DVD box set, released in on May 7, 2002. The most recent release was as part of the season two Blu-ray set on December 4, 2012. For the season two Blu-ray set, CBS decided to include a special "Extended Cut". This added thirteen minutes of original footage, identified from a rough cut of the episode that had been on a VHS cassette owned by Snodgrass. The difference in the running time was attributed to "small personal moments" by Snodgrass, which added that Riker wanted to beat Picard although he cared for Data. This was emphasised in one particular scene, which Snodgrass was pleased had been restored to the episode. "The Measure of a Man" received a cinematic release alongside "Q Who" for one night on November 29, 2012, to promote the Blu-ray release. This was the second time that a pair of The Next Generation episodes received a cinematic release to promote the release of a Blu-ray season box set.

== See also ==
- Law in Star Trek
- A Matter of Perspective
- Ex Post Facto (Star Trek: Voyager)
- Author, Author (Star Trek: Voyager)
