= Star Trek: The Next Generation season 2 =

1988–89 season of American television series

Star Trek: The Next Generation
- Season 2
- Region A/1 Blu-ray cover art
- Starring: Patrick Stewart; Jonathan Frakes; LeVar Burton; Michael Dorn; Marina Sirtis; Brent Spiner; Wil Wheaton; Diana Muldaur
- No. of episodes: 22

Release
- Original network: Broadcast syndication
- Original release: November 21, 1988 – July 17, 1989

Season chronology
- ← Previous; Season 1 Next → Season 3

The second season of the American science fiction television series Star Trek: The Next Generation commenced airing in broadcast syndication in the United States on November 21, 1988, and concluded on July 17, 1989, after airing 22 episodes. Set in the 24th century, the series follows the adventures of the crew of the Starfleet starship Enterprise-D. Season two featured changes to the main cast, following the departure of Gates McFadden. Diana Muldaur was cast as Dr. Katherine Pulaski for a single season before the return of McFadden in season three. Academy Award winner Whoopi Goldberg also joined the cast after pursuing a role from the producers.

There were significant changes backstage to the writing team. Maurice Hurley became head writer, and following extensive re-writes to "The Royale" and "Manhunt", Tracy Tormé left the writing team. Likewise, following the submission of a script for "Blood and Fire", David Gerrold allowed his contract to run out due to issues with Gene Roddenberry and Leonard Maizlish, Roddenberry's lawyer. Other departing writers included Leonard Mlodinow and Scott Rubenstein, while Melinda M. Snodgrass, Hans Beimler and Richard Manning joined the team. At the end of the season, Hurley also left the team. Production designer Herman F. Zimmerman left the show to work on Star Trek V: The Final Frontier and was replaced by Richard James, who remained with the show for the rest of the series.

The 1988 Writers Guild of America strike caused the season to be shortened to 22 episodes, the lowest count for any season in the series. The strike was later blamed for the lack of quality of the first few episodes. The strike also resulted in the writing team using an unused script from the aborted Star Trek: Phase II to open the season, entitled "The Child". Budgetary changes allowed for individual episode funding to be carried between episodes, but this resulted in a lack of funding towards the end of the season which the crew attempted to solve by creating a clip show, "Shades of Gray".

"The Child" opened to 10.9 million viewers, and ratings peaked with both "A Matter of Honor" and "The Measure of a Man", which were watched by 11.3 million. Although a decrease in viewers saw the lowest number of viewers for a first-run episode in the series in "Manhunt", the show became the third most-watched series in its timeslot. Critics praised the episodes "The Measure of a Man" and "Q Who", but found "Shades of Gray" to be one of the worst episodes of the entire Star Trek franchise. The season was first released on DVD on May 7, 2002, on Region 1, and was subsequently released on Regions 2 and 3. The region-free Blu-ray releases came in December 2012, with "The Measure of a Man" and "Q Who" receiving a limited theatrical release.

== Production ==
=== Writing ===
The second season saw Maurice Hurley being promoted to head writer after the departure of Robert Lewin. Hurley had been brought on board during the first season. His prior experience had been with shows such as The Equalizer and Miami Vice, and he later explained that he took the position because it challenged him. The 1988 Writers Guild of America strike had caused problems at the end of the first season, and these continued as the development of season two started, resulting in a shortened season. Executive producer Rick Berman blamed a decrease in quality at the start of season two on the lack of time available for proper development due to the writer's strike. Hurley felt that the writing on the show managed to get into a rhythm during the second half of the first season, and that the strike stopped that and resulted in his eventually leaving the series. He also criticised the lack of character arcs in the series, saying that "I did some good, some bad, some mediocre, but it's not a show that I could continue to do. It's not where I come from."

Hurley had objected to the violent and gory scenes seen in the first-season episode "Conspiracy", written by Tracy Tormé, and Tormé continued to feel alienated by Hurley. Tormé stepped down from his role as co-executive story editor, taking credit instead as a creative consultant. Following Hurley's modifications to Tormé's scripts for "The Royale" and "Manhunt", Tormé elected to be credited under a pseudonym only. At one point, Roddenberry had thought that Tormé would become eventual showrunner, but the writer left due to the re-writes required under Hurley's tenure. Hannah Louise Shearer also left the team between seasons, due to differences with Hurley, but contributed stories in later seasons. Other writers joined the team during the second season, including The Tears of the Singers author Melinda M. Snodgrass, who sold the script for "The Measure of a Man". Hans Beimler and Richard Manning were hired in the newly created positions of executive script consultants. They had both been story editors for the final eight episodes of the first season. Snodgrass later explained that, "Once I came on board there suddenly seemed to be this climate of discussion among the writers about what we wanted to do with the show. My impression was that this was a new phenomenon. We were a little bit more on the same wavelength." She was hired as a story editor following the submission of her first episode, alongside Leonard Mlodinow and Scott Rubenstein. The other two editors left after four more episodes, with Snodgrass remaining as the sole story editor for the rest of the season.

==== "Blood and Fire" ====
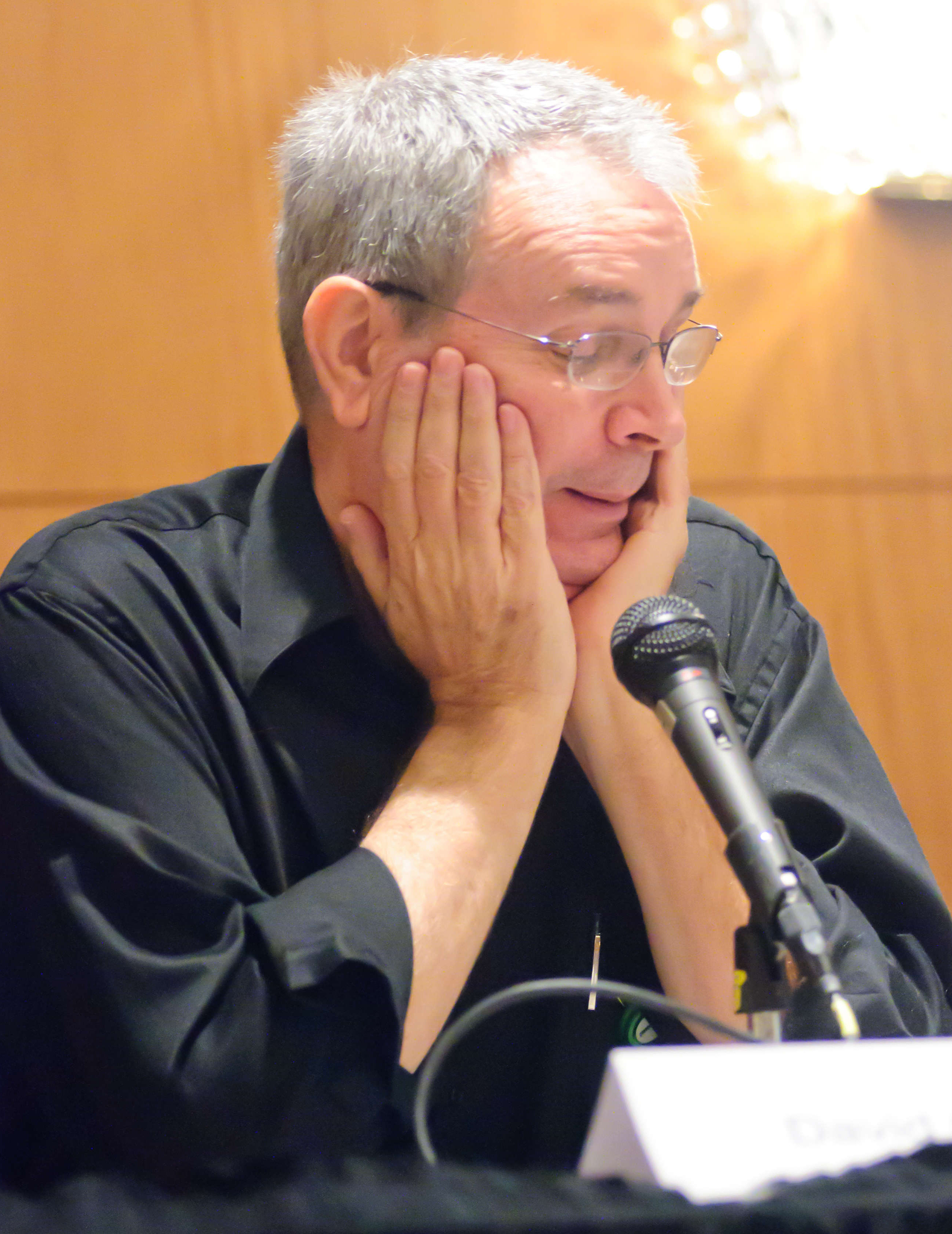
David Gerrold was one of several writers to leave The Next Generation during the second season.

Another writer who left the show during season two was David Gerrold. He wrote an episode for The Original Series called "The Trouble with Tribbles" and came on-board The Next Generation before the pilot and wrote the first version of the bible for the series. Berman stated in an early memo that the new series was intended to be an issues-based show in the same mold as the original. Creator Gene Roddenberry concurred, and under questioning from fans at a convention which Gerrold also attended, Roddenberry agreed that it was time for a homosexual character to appear in Star Trek. Roddenberry told his staff that "Times have changed and we have got to be aware of it." This resulted in Gerrold pitching a story called "Blood and Fire", which included two homosexual crew members and an AIDS allegory. Roddenberry cleared the idea to be produced into a script, and Gerrold went off to appear on a Star Trek cruise having received a telegram telling him that everyone in the office was pleased with the new story.

Upon his return, he found that the story was not going to be used in the current form. Gerrold later said that "I was told that Gene's lawyer did not like the script and felt that this was not a good episode, and so on his advice, it seems, the script was cancelled. That's what I was told by someone who was in a position to know. I don't have any proof in writing, so I have to qualify it by saying someone told me." Official sources stated that Paramount became involved, and that the company felt the story was inappropriate for younger viewers in the syndicated marketplace and that complaints would be received from parents. The script was given to Herbert Wright to re-write. Roddenberry gave Wright a number notes on the script, who accidentally handed over notes on the script to Gerrold which were written by Roddenberry's lawyer, Leonard Maizlish. Due to the workload on Wright at the time, Gerrold offered to make a first attempt at the re-write with the intention of removing the homosexual characters. After initially clearing that with Roddenberry, Wright later received a phone call from him telling Wright not to let Gerrold work on it. Shortly after, Wright received a second call from Maizlish to reinforce the message that Gerrold must not be allowed to work on the script.

After numerous revisions by Wright, including a version called "Blood and Ice", the script was eventually dropped from the schedule. Gerrold asked for his contract not to be renewed following the problems with the episode. Ernie Over, Roddenberry's personal assistant at the time, later said that the claims were blown out of proportion by Gerrold, that "Blood and Fire" was simply a bad script. No openly homosexual characters were ever written into another episode of the show.

=== Development ===
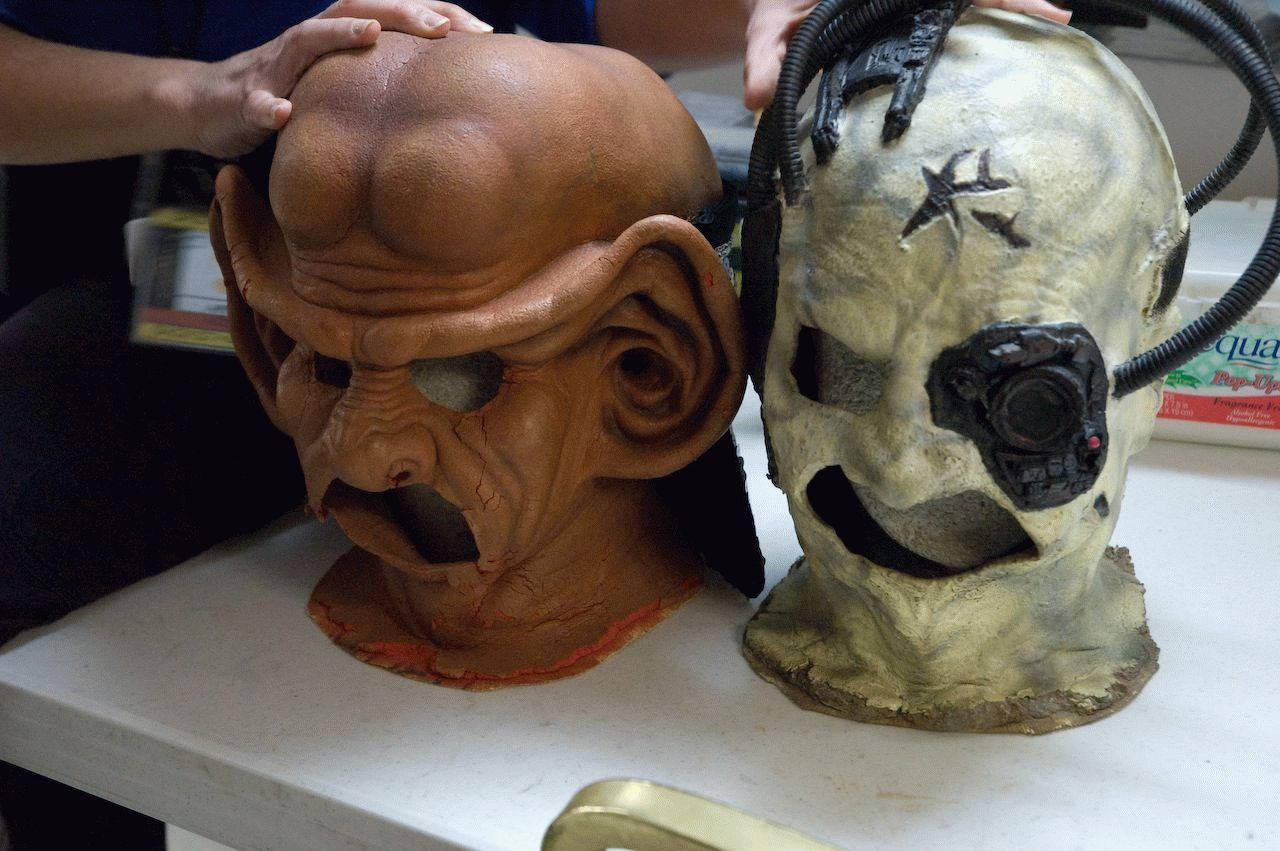
Ferengi (left) and Borg (right) masks at Star Trek: The Experience, in Las Vegas

The series bible stated the intention to create new villains for the new show, but after the failure of the Ferengi, the Romulans were re-introduced in the final episode of the first season and continued to be featured throughout season two. The cybernetic Borg were introduced in the episode "Q Who", modified from the insectoid race that Hurley had intended to introduce in a longer version of the season one finale "The Neutral Zone". The Borg returned sporadically throughout the rest of the series, appearing in five further episodes. Unlike almost all other alien adversaries created for The Next Generation, they became one of only two to transition into films with Star Trek: First Contact. A further change seen in season two, which increased later in the season, was an increased focus on the trio of Captain Jean-Luc Picard, Commander William T. Riker and Lt Cmdr. Data, reminiscent of Captain James T. Kirk, Dr. Leonard McCoy and Commander Spock in Star Trek: The Original Series. This relegated the other cast members to background roles for the majority of episodes.

Paramount changed the way that individual episodes were funded, with overspending on some episode budgets allowed on the proviso that it would be recouped by a reduction in others. Due to the effects of the writer's strike, the writing staff searched the scripts from Star Trek: Phase II, a series which was cancelled before being filmed; the first planned episode had been developed into Star Trek: The Motion Picture. From those scripts, one was identified with potential for season two; it resulted in the opening episode "The Child". The role of Lt. Ilia was rewritten in the story to become a part for Marina Sirtis as Counselor Deanna Troi. Sirtis praised this development, as she felt she had been overlooked during the first season due to the presence of both McFadden and Denise Crosby.

Episodes were developed to touch on social issues in the same manner as The Original Series. "The Child" featured a brief debate on abortion, "Up the Long Ladder" discussed cloning, and "Loud as a Whisper" was about accepting the legitimacy of sign language for the deaf. Problems arose when the estate of Arthur Conan Doyle threatened to sue the producers if the show used Sherlock Holmes once more following the episode "Elementary, Dear Data". Budgetary reasons resulted in the season ending with the episode "Shades of Gray", a clip show consisting mostly of footage of earlier episodes. That episode was filmed over three days instead of the usual seven, and was agreed by the production staff to be one of the worst episodes of any Star Trek series.

=== Make-up and set design ===
Following issues with his make-up throughout the first season, Michael Dorn's Klingon prosthetics were modified. Michael Westmore made the headpiece simpler, and Dorn took to wearing a headband under the headpiece to reduce a skin rash on his forehead. The headpiece was then glued down around the edges.

The bridge set was moved from Stage 6 to the larger Stage 8 on the Paramount lot between season 1 and 2, and in the process was re-assembled slightly asymmetrically, an error no one noticed despite remaining that way through the rest of the series. Other modifications made to the bridge set included redesigned rear bridge stations so that LeVar Burton's character Geordi La Forge, in his new role as Chief Engineer, could have a work station on the bridge, and modifications to several chairs to fit the actors better. A viewscreen was added to the observation lounge and a new set was created to represent the Ten-Forward lounge. The lounge was the final set to be designed for The Next Generation by Herman Zimmerman. He explained that "Ten-Forward became the place where ordinary crew and the officers could mingle, and where aliens who were not allowed on the bridge could interact with other crew-members. It was a very important set for the telling of stories."

=== Casting ===
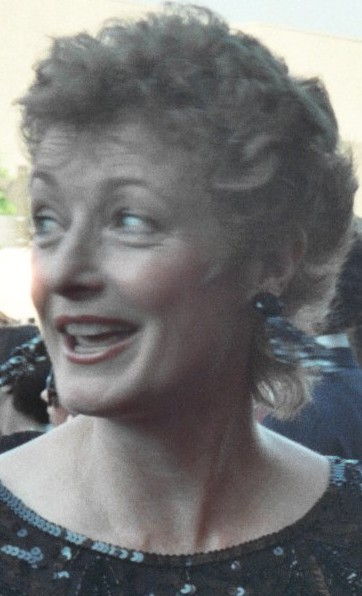
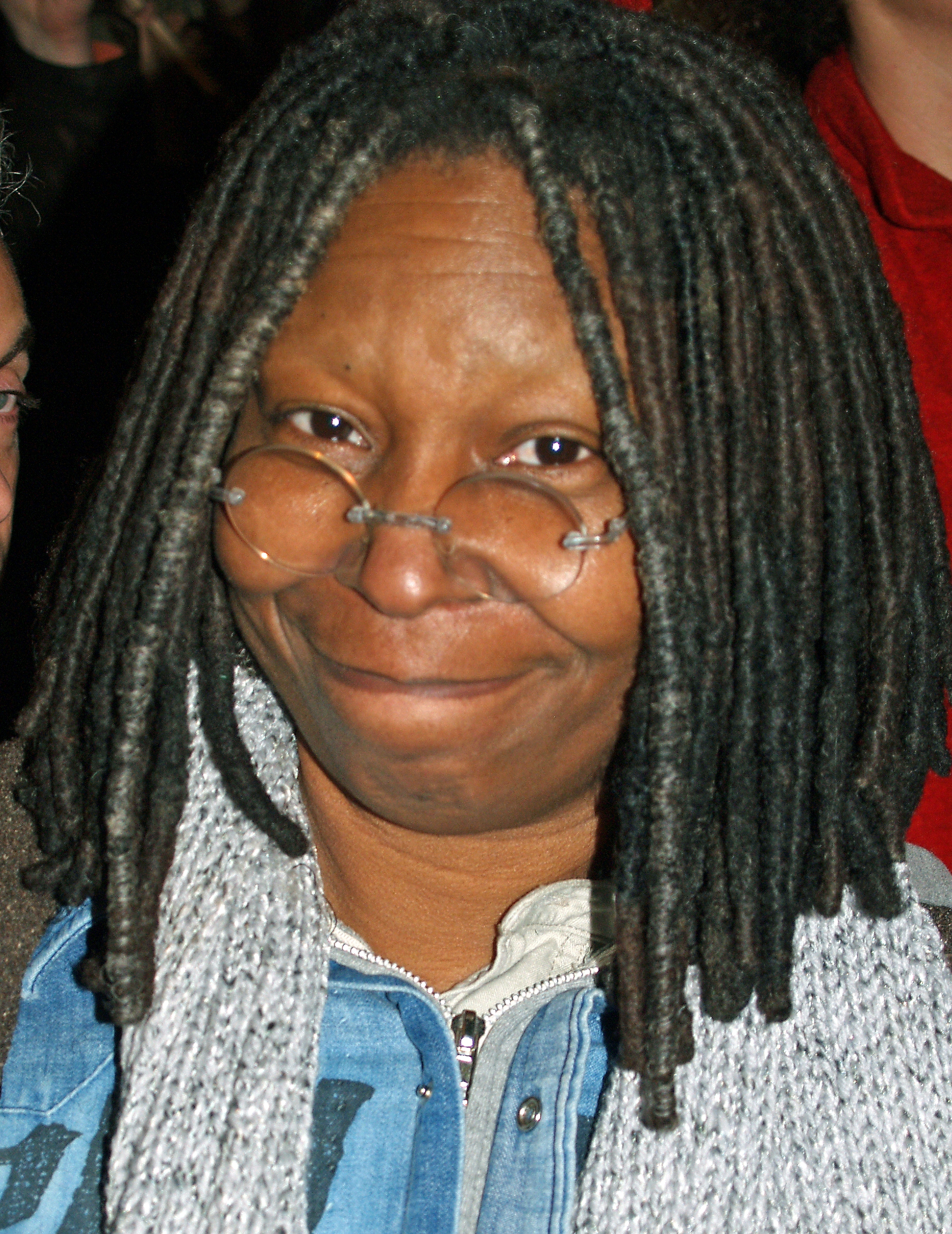
Diana Muldaur and Whoopi Goldberg both joined the cast for season two in major roles.

Before the second season, there was a change to the main cast. Gates McFadden, who portrayed Dr. Beverly Crusher, was fired from the show and replaced with Diana Muldaur, who played a new character called Dr. Katherine Pulaski. Rick Berman later said that "There were those who believed at the end of the first season that they didn't like the way her character was developing, vis-a-vis Gates' performance, and managed to convince Mr. Roddenberry of that". He said that he did not agree with the decision. McFadden later claimed in 2023 she was let go because Maurice Hurley was "pissed off" at her asking him why there weren't more serious scenes between Dr. Crusher and her son, Wesley. Keith DeCandido also suggested that it was Hurley who wanted McFadden out of the show, and after he left at the end of the season, the door was open for her to return. Roddenberry decided to write Crusher out rather than killing the character to allow for McFadden's return in the future.

Pulaski was intended to be reminiscent of Dr. Leonard McCoy from The Original Series. Muldaur had appeared twice in The Original Series, first as Dr. Anne Mulhull in "Return to Tomorrow" and later as Dr. Miranda Jones in "Is There in Truth No Beauty?". She had also appeared in a Roddenberry-led pilot, Planet Earth.

Christina Pickles had also been considered for the part, and Berman stated that she was the second choice for the role. Muldaur was offered a main cast credit, but declined in favor of a "special guest appearance" credit, and went into the role expecting only to be in the show for a single season. Muldaur left after season two, with McFadden returning as Crusher for season three. Muldaur said that "People have tried to create some kind of something out of it, but she played one part and I played a totally different part... it would not have been good to have continued very much longer, even though everyone was really lovely".

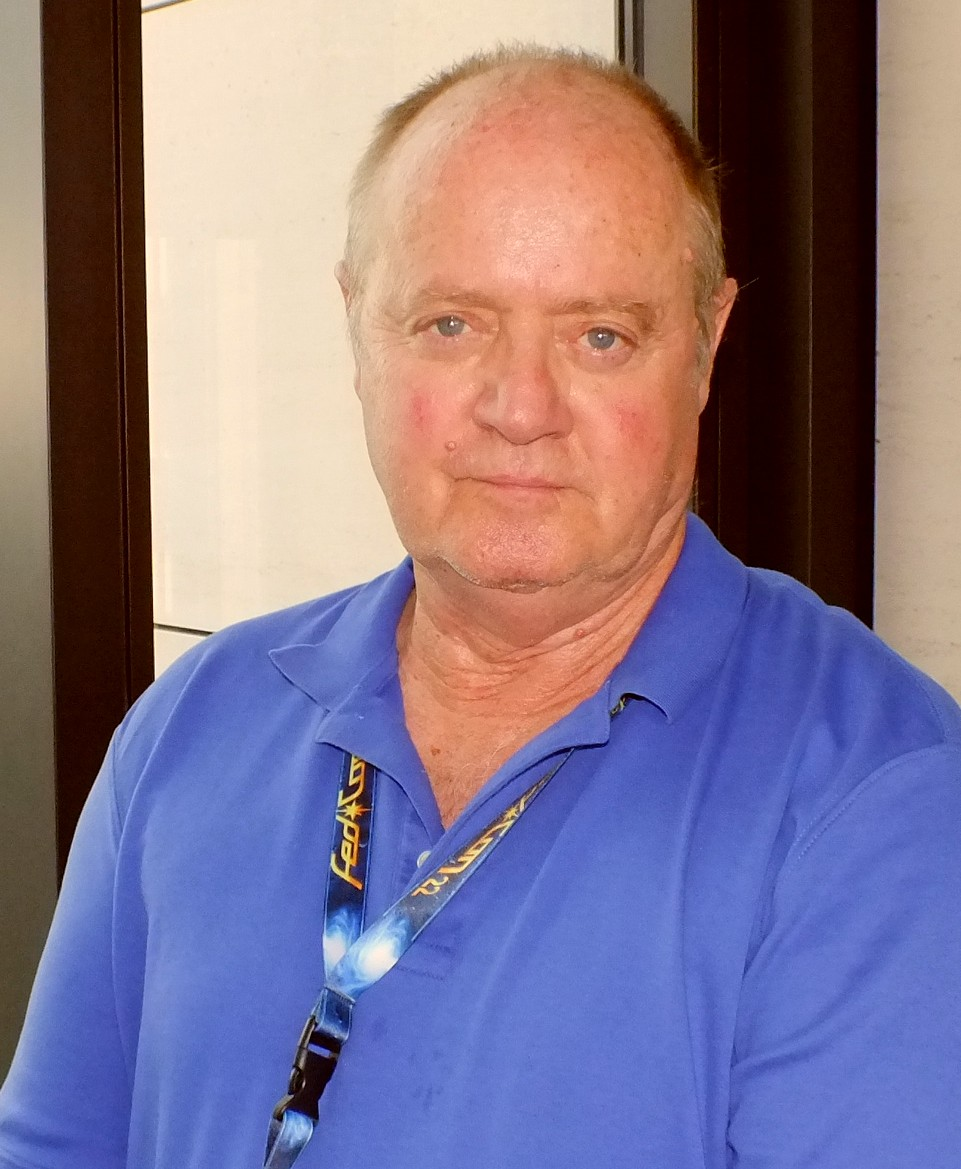
Gowron actor Robert O'Reilly guest starred in "Manhunt".

Another actress to join the show was Academy Award winner Whoopi Goldberg, who had been a long-time Star Trek fan. She credited Nichelle Nichols as Uhura in The Original Series as an inspiration, saying "Well, when I was nine years old Star Trek came on, I looked at it and I went screaming through the house, 'Come here, mum, everybody, come quick, come quick, there's a black lady on television and she ain't no maid!' I knew right then and there I could be anything I wanted to be." To appear on the show, Goldberg contacted the producers initially through LeVar Burton. The producers did not believe her as they felt that a movie star such as Goldberg would not want to appear in Star Trek, and ignored calls from her agent, until Goldberg called them personally. A meeting was arranged between her and Rick Berman, and she agreed to appear in six episodes of season two. Her character, Guinan, was named after Mary "Texas" Guinan, a prohibition-era speakeasy owner.

Guest stars in season two included Teri Hatcher, who appeared in the episode "The Outrageous Okona" before she gained the role of Lois Lane in the Superman television series Lois and Clark. She was not credited for the role as transporter chief B.G. Robinson after the majority of her scenes were cut from the final episode, resulting in her requesting that the credit be removed. That episode also featured a guest appearance by Billy Campbell, who had been the second choice in the original casting for Commander William Riker. He gained the role in the episode after contacting casting agent Junie Lowry and asking to be in an episode. Musician Mick Fleetwood made a cameo as an Antedean ambassador in the episode "Manhunt", although he did not have any lines. Robert O'Reilly, who appeared in "Manhunt", later gained the part of the Klingon Gowron in season three. His character became Klingon Chancellor, and he appeared in several more TNG episodes as well as having a recurring role in Star Trek: Deep Space Nine. O'Reilly's final appearance in Star Trek was as yet another character, in the Star Trek: Enterprise episode "Bounty".

=== Crew ===
Following work on Star Trek V: The Final Frontier, production designer Herman F. Zimmerman elected to leave the franchise. He had intended to pursue a career in design for films, but after working on Black Rain, he returned to Star Trek with Star Trek VI: The Undiscovered Country and took on the role of production designer for Star Trek: Deep Space Nine. For The Next Generation, he recommended Richard James as his successor. James took the position as an interim measure while a permanent candidate was looked for. He ended up staying with The Next Generation as lead production designer for the rest of the series, and afterwards joined Star Trek: Voyager in the same role. John M. Dwyer left with Zimmerman, and Jim Mees was brought in to replace him. Andrew Probert, the designer of the Enterprise-D, left his role as principal illustrator to join The Walt Disney Company. He was replaced by Rick Sternbach, who was supervised by James in his new role.

== Reception ==
=== Ratings ===
By the end of season one, The Next Generation had become the highest-rated first-run hour-long syndicated series, and the third highest-rated syndicated show overall, behind only Wheel of Fortune and Jeopardy. The first episode of season two, "The Child", aired on November 21, 1988, to Nielsen ratings of 10.9 million. After an initial slight decrease in viewers over the next five episodes, the season broke the 11 million mark with "Unnatural Selection" and then peaked as the next two episodes, "A Matter of Honor" and "The Measure of a Man", were both watched by 11.3 million viewers. After this, the ratings decreased gradually until "Manhunt", watched by 8.9 million and receiving the lowest ratings for a first-run broadcast of a Next Generation episode. "Shades of Gray" closed the season on July 17, 1989, watched by 9.8 million viewers. Despite the higher ratings seen in the earlier part of the season, it was only from "Q Who" onwards that The Next Generation rose to become the third most-viewed series in its timeslot.

=== Reviews ===
Keith DeCandido for Tor.com said that second season was the one on which the rest of the series was based, with characters taking long-term roles such as Geordi La Forge as Chief Engineer and Worf at the Tactical station. DeCandido said that the addition of Goldberg as Guinan was "delightful", but that Diana Muldaur as Dr. Pulaski "didn't entirely work as a character". In his view, the episodes during season two were varied in quality. He gave "Q Who" ten out of ten, while he gave "Shades of Gray" a zero. It was the first time he awarded the top score to an episode; none of the first season had qualified. He gave the season an overall mark of seven out of ten and said that "Far too many people say that TNG didn't come into its own until the third season, and frankly, I think that that estimation comes a year too late."

Jamahl Epsicokhan at his website "Jammer's Reviews" gave full marks of four out of four to both "The Measure of a Man" and "Q Who". His highlight of the former was the performance of Patrick Stewart as Picard in the courtroom setting, while of the latter, he said that it was the "most absolutely necessary episode of TNG's second season". Like DeCandido, Epsicokhan gave "Shades of Gray" a score of zero and described it as "the most pointless episode of TNG ever made". IGN's Scott Collura thought that season two was an improvement over the roughness of season one and was the first time that the show stepped out from the shadow of The Original Series. He stated that several of the more memorable elements of Star Trek were introduced in this season, such as the Borg. He said that "The Measure of a Man" was the highlight of the season, while he described "Shades of Gray" as "Riker's Cheap-Ass Trip Down Memory Lane".

=== Accolades ===
Episodes in season two of The Next Generation were nominated for eight Emmy Awards. "Q Who" was nominated in three categories, winning two: Outstanding Sound Editing for a Series and Outstanding Sound Mixing for a Drama Series. These were the only Emmy Awards won by the show; the other episodes nominated were "Elementary, Dear Data" in two categories, while "A Matter of Honor", "The Child" and "Unnatural Selection" were each nominated once. For the second year in a row, Wil Wheaton was nominated for a Youth in Film Awards, this time for Best Young Actor in a Family Syndicated Show. This year marked his first and only win, out of three nominations. The show also won the award for Best Syndicated Family Drama or Comedy. Melinda M. Snodgrass received the only nomination for the series at the Writers Guild of America Awards for Best Episodic Drama for the episode "The Measure of a Man".

== Cast ==
The following actors and actresses appear in the season:

=== Main cast ===
- Patrick Stewart as Captain Jean-Luc Picard
- Jonathan Frakes as Commander William T. Riker
- Brent Spiner as Lt. Cmdr. Data
- LeVar Burton as Lt. Geordi La Forge
- Marina Sirtis as Counselor (Lt. Cmdr.) Deanna Troi
- Michael Dorn as Lt (j.g.). Worf
- Wil Wheaton as Acting Ensign Wesley Crusher
- Diana Muldaur as Dr. (Cmdr.) Katherine Pulaski (Note: Diana Muldaur was credited as a "Special Guest Star" in every episode throughout season two.)

=== Recurring cast ===
- Colm Meaney as Transporter Chief (Lt.) Miles O'Brien
- Whoopi Goldberg as Guinan
- Lycia Naff as Ensign Sonia Gomez
- Suzie Plakson as Dr. (Lt.) Selar and Ambassador K'Ehleyr
- Rhonda Aldrich as Madeline
- Majel Barrett as Lwaxana Troi
- John de Lancie as Q

=== Guests ===
- Armin Shimerman as Bractor
- Carel Struycken as Mr. Homn

== Episodes ==
In the following table, episodes are listed by the order in which they aired.

No. overall	No. in season	Title	Directed by	Written by	Original release date	Prod. code	Nielsen rating
27	1	"The Child"	Rob Bowman	Jaron Summers & Jon Povill and Maurice Hurley	November 21, 1988	127	10.9
Dr. Katherine Pulaski (Diana Muldaur) joins the Enterprise while Lt. Geordi La Forge (LeVar Burton) prepares the Enterprise to transport dangerous plague specimens; Counsellor Deanna Troi (Marina Sirtis) spontaneously becomes pregnant and gives birth to a mysterious child.
28	2	"Where Silence Has Lease"	Winrich Kolbe	Jack B. Sowards	November 28, 1988	128	10.3
The Enterprise becomes trapped in a spatial phenomenon. Here they are subjected to unusual experiments by the whim of a being unlike any they have encountered before.
29	3	"Elementary, Dear Data"	Rob Bowman	Brian Alan Lane	December 5, 1988	129	Unknown
After Lt. Commander Data (Brent Spiner) easily solves an ordinary Sherlock Holmes holodeck mystery, La Forge asks the computer to make a Holmes villain capable of defeating him. The resultant Professor Moriarty (Daniel Davis) soon becomes far more powerful than expected.
30	4	"The Outrageous Okona"	Robert Becker	Story by : Les Menchen & Lance Dickson and David Landsberg; Teleplay by : Burton Armus	December 12, 1988	130	Unknown
The Enterprise is caught up in the schemes of a flamboyant space rogue on the run, while Data explores humor with the help of a holodeck comedian (Joe Piscopo).
31	5	"Loud as a Whisper"	Larry Shaw	Jacqueline Zambrano	January 9, 1989	132	10.7
The crew play host to a deaf, telepathic ambassador (Howie Seago) who mediates difficult peace negotiations with the assistance of his trio of telepathic interpreters.
32	6	"The Schizoid Man"	Les Landau	Story by : Richard Manning & Hans Beimler; Teleplay by : Tracy Tormé	January 23, 1989	131	10.8
Scientist Dr. Ira Graves (W. Morgan Sheppard) cheats death by uploading his memories and personality into Lt. Commander Data (Brent Spiner).
33	7	"Unnatural Selection"	Paul Lynch	John Mason & Mike Gray	January 30, 1989	133	11.0
The Enterprise receives a distress call from the USS Lantree, discovering its crew has apparently died of old age. The race is on to solve the mystery before scientists on a research colony suffer the same fate.
34	8	"A Matter of Honor"	Rob Bowman	Story by : Wanda M. Haight & Gregory Amos and Burton Armus; Teleplay by : Burton Armus	February 6, 1989	134	11.3
Commander William Riker (Jonathan Frakes) is assigned to a Klingon vessel via an officer exchange program between the Federation and the Klingon Empire. However, the Klingon Captain is full of mistrust and wants Riker to fire on the Enterprise.
35	9	"The Measure of a Man"	Robert Scheerer	Melinda M. Snodgrass	February 13, 1989	135	11.3
After Lt. Commander Data (Brent Spiner) refuses an order from Starfleet to be dismantled for research purposes, a hearing is convened to determine if he is a legal citizen or property of the Federation.
36	10	"The Dauphin"	Rob Bowman	Scott Rubenstein & Leonard Mlodinow	February 20, 1989	136	10.7
The Enterprise hosts the young leader of Daled IV, Salia (Jaime Hubbard). Soon Wesley Crusher (Wil Wheaton) finds himself falling in love with her. However, Salia and her guardian harbor a secret.
37	11	"Contagion"	Joseph L. Scanlan	Steve Gerber & Beth Woods	March 20, 1989	137	10.2
A dangerous alien computer virus runs rampant through the Enterprise after causing the destruction of her sister ship, the USS Yamato.
38	12	"The Royale"	Cliff Bole	Tracy Tormé (Note: Credited as Keith Mills)	March 27, 1989	138	10.6
Riker (Jonathan Frakes), Worf (Michael Dorn), and Data (Brent Spiner) investigate a structure on the surface of an icy gas giant, which appears to be a hotel from 20th-century Earth. When they try to leave, they are prevented from doing so, and are forced to stay.
39	13	"Time Squared"	Joseph L. Scanlan	Story by : Kurt Michael Bensmiller; Teleplay by : Maurice Hurley	April 3, 1989	139	9.9
Captain Jean-Luc Picard (Patrick Stewart) encounters his unconscious future self when the Enterprise becomes caught in a time loop where the Enterprise is destroyed by a space anomaly.
40	14	"The Icarus Factor"	Robert Iscove	Story by : David Assael; Teleplay by : David Assael and Robert McCullough	April 24, 1989	140	9.1
Riker's estranged father, Kyle (Mitchell Ryan), visits to brief him on a starship command he's been offered, and Worf's friends discover he is about to miss an important Klingon rite of passage.
41	15	"Pen Pals"	Winrich Kolbe	Story by : Hannah Louise Shearer; Teleplay by : Melinda M. Snodgrass	May 1, 1989	141	9.7
The Prime Directive is threatened when Data befriends the child of a pre-warp planet that is suffering from devastating volcanic activity.
42	16	"Q Who"	Rob Bowman	Maurice Hurley	May 8, 1989	142	10.3
Q (John de Lancie) flings the Enterprise 7,000 light years beyond Federation space and into a confrontation with the deadly Borg.
43	17	"Samaritan Snare"	Les Landau	Robert McCullough	May 15, 1989	143	10.0
A group of seemingly dimwitted aliens, the Pakleds, kidnap Lt. La Forge to "make their ship go". Picard undergoes surgery at a starbase.
44	18	"Up the Long Ladder"	Winrich Kolbe	Melinda M. Snodgrass	May 22, 1989	144	9.2
Captain Picard must find a way to rescue two radically incompatible cultures, one a primitive Irish farming colony threatened by solar flares, and the other a colony of clones facing inevitable genetic degeneration.
45	19	"Manhunt"	Rob Bowman	Tracy Tormé (Note: Credited as Terry Devereaux)	June 19, 1989	145	8.9
Troi's mother Lwaxana (Majel Barrett) is in the market for a new husband, and she has set her sights on Captain Picard.
46	20	"The Emissary"	Cliff Bole	Story by : Richard Manning & Hans Beimler; Teleplay by : Richard Manning & Hans Beimler Based on an unpublished story by: Thomas H. Calder	June 26, 1989	146	9.0
Worf's former lover comes aboard the Enterprise to help deal with a ship full of Klingons in stasis and unaware they are no longer at war with the Federation.
47	21	"Peak Performance"	Robert Scheerer	David Kemper	July 10, 1989	147	9.4
The Enterprise and USS Hathaway face off in simulated combat maneuvers. Data fails to beat a humanoid at a game of Strategema and exhibits self-doubt.
48	22	"Shades of Gray"	Rob Bowman	Story by : Maurice Hurley; Teleplay by : Maurice Hurley and Richard Manning & Hans Beimler	July 17, 1989	148	9.8
Commander Riker is poisoned into a coma in which he relives various moments of his service aboard the Enterprise.

== Home media release ==
The Blu-ray release of season two includes an extended version of "The Measure of a Man", using cut footage that writer Melinda M. Snodgrass had kept on VHS. The released version includes a hybrid version with both the remastered high-definition footage interspersed with the footage from the VHS tape. The additional twelve minutes of footage is raw, and features no music or special effects, but it was the first episode of The Next Generation to receive an extended cut. The Blu-ray releases of seasons one and two of The Next Generation were awarded the Saturn Award for Best Television Series release at the 2013 awards.

"The Measure of a Man" and "Q Who" received a limited theatrical release for one night on November 29, 2012. The version of "The Measure of a Man" shown was the extended version. It was the second cinema release for episodes of The Next Generation, as "Where No One Has Gone Before" and "Datalore" had been released to promote the Blu-ray release of the first season.

Star Trek: The Next Generation – Season 2
Set details		Special features	
22 episodes; 5-disc set; 1.33:1 aspect ratio; Subtitles: Danish, German, English, Spanish, French, Italian, Dutch, Norwegian, Swedish, English for the hearing impaired; English (Dolby Digital 5.1 Surround), German, Spanish, French and Italian (Dolby Digital 2.0 Surround)		DVD and Blu-ray: Mission Overview: Year Two; Selected Crew Analysis: Year Two; Departmental Briefing: Year Two: Production; Departmental Briefing: Year Two: Memorable Missions; Inside Starfleet Archives; Blu-ray only: Reunification: 25 Years After Star Trek: The Next Generation; Making It So: Continuing Star Trek: The Next Generation; Part 1: Strange New Worlds; Part 2: New Life and New Civilisations; Energized! Season Two Tech Update; "The Measure of a Man" extended version, with audio commentary by Melinda M. Snodgrass and Denise Okuda; "The Measure of a Man" hybrid extended version; "Q Who" audio commentary by Rob Bowman, Dan Curry and Mike Okuda; Delete scenes: "The Icarus Factor", "Up the Long Ladder"; 1988 Reading Rainbow segment with LeVar Burton; 2012 Reading Rainbow iTunes promo; Season Two gag reel; 1988 On-Air season 2 promo; Episodic promos	
Release dates
DVD		Blu-ray	
Region 1	Region 2	United States (Region free)	United Kingdom (Region free)
May 7, 2002; March 12, 2013 (re-released)	June 10, 2002	December 4, 2012	December 10, 2012
