= Contagion (Star Trek: The Next Generation) =

- Star Trek: The Next Generation episode
- Episode no.: Season 2 Episode 11
- Directed by: Joseph L. Scanlan
- Written by: Steve Gerber; Beth Woods
- Cinematography by: Edward R. Brown
- Production code: 137
- Original air date: March 20, 1989

Guest appearances
- Thalmus Rasulala – Capt. Donald Varley; Carolyn Seymour – Taris; Dana Sparks – Williams; Colm Meaney – Miles O'Brien; Folkert Schmidt – Doctor

Episode chronology
← Previous "The Dauphin"	Next → "The Royale"
- Star Trek: The Next Generation season 2

"Contagion" is the eleventh episode of the second season of the American science fiction television series Star Trek: The Next Generation, the 37th episode overall. It was originally released on March 20, 1989, in broadcast syndication. It was written by Steve Gerber and Beth Woods, and was directed by Joseph L. Scanlan.

Set in the 24th century, the series follows the adventures of the Starfleet crew of the USS Enterprise. In this episode, Picard and company try to protect the Enterprise against a catastrophic malfunction and simultaneously unlock the secrets of the once-powerful Iconian empire while keeping those secrets from the watchful Romulans.

== Plot ==
The Enterprise receives a distress signal from the USS Yamato within the Romulan Neutral Zone, and travels to assist. After the Enterprise arrives, the Yamato suddenly explodes. Shortly afterwards, a Romulan Warbird, the Haakona, demands the Enterprise retreat from the Neutral Zone. Captain Jean-Luc Picard responds that they will not leave until they have determined why the Yamato was destroyed.

Picard reviews the logs of the Yamato's Captain Varley. Varley, an archeology buff like Picard, believed he had found the fabled planet of Iconia within the Neutral Zone, and feared that the Romulans might be attempting to acquire advanced Iconian technology for use against the Federation. However, when the Yamato neared the planet, it was scanned by a probe, and began to experience system failures. The Enterprise begins experiencing similar issues. Picard orders the Enterprise to Iconia to see if a solution can be found there.

When they enter the planet's orbit, a probe is launched from the surface. Chief Engineer La Forge deduces that the probe carries a computer virus that caused the Yamato's destruction, and insists on destroying the probe. However, a portion of the virus stored in the Yamato logs has infected the Enterprise, threatening to destroy it in a matter of hours. Picard, Lt. Commander Data, and Lt. Worf beam to the planet. They find a transportation portal that allows instantaneous travel to a number of destinations, including the Enterprise and Haakona bridges. Data becomes infected with the virus, but retains enough function to instruct Picard on how to destroy the base.

Meanwhile, the Haakona threatens to attack the Enterprise, but soon begins to suffer from similar system failures. Picard orders Worf to return with Data to the Enterprise using the Iconian gate, while he destroys the base. Before the structure explodes, Picard uses the gate to jump onto the Haakona's bridge and discovers that their ship is set on an auto-destruct sequence they cannot stop.

On the Enterprise, Data's systems are nearly overtaken by the virus. His body automatically shuts down as a protective measure, and then restarts, free of the virus. La Forge suggests a similar cold boot to clear the virus from the Enterprise. With the transporters back online, Picard is beamed off the Haakona, and Riker sends instructions to the Romulans on how to clear the virus. The Romulans successfully restart their computers, and both ships peacefully leave the Neutral Zone as the Iconian base destroys itself on the surface of the planet.

== Production ==
Staff graphic designer Michael Okuda said of the plot, "I thought it was exciting, but the level of computer technology was not quite as advanced as it will really be that far into the future. The idea of an information-based weapon of that kind was pretty good. I thought the computer would be a little more protected than it appeared."

Andrew Probert was the lead designer of the Enterprise 1701-D and the Romulan Warbird seen in this episode. The Romulan Warbird was previously introduced in "The Neutral Zone"; the model was built by Greg Jein.

== Reception ==
Keith R.A. DeCandido of Tor.com rated the episode 4 out of 10. James Hunt of Den of Geek gave the episode a negative review and recommended skipping it. Zack Handlen of The A.V. Club gave the episode a B on his rewatch.

== Continuity ==
An Iconian gateway was central to the plot of "To the Death", a 1996 episode in season 4 of Star Trek: Deep Space Nine.
