= Samaritan Snare =

- Star Trek: The Next Generation episode
- Episode no.: Season 2 Episode 17
- Directed by: Les Landau
- Written by: Robert L. McCullough
- Production code: 143
- Original air date: May 15, 1989

Guest appearances
- Christopher Collins – Grebnedlog; Leslie Morris – Reginod; Daniel Benzali – Surgeon; Lycia Naff – Ens. Sonya Gomez; Tzi Ma – Biomolecular specialist

Episode chronology
← Previous "Q Who"	Next → "Up the Long Ladder"
- Star Trek: The Next Generation season 2

"Samaritan Snare" is the seventeenth episode of the second season of the American science fiction television series Star Trek: The Next Generation, and the 43rd episode overall. It was first released on May 15, 1989, in broadcast syndication.

Set in the 24th century, the series follows the adventures of the Starfleet crew of the Federation starship Enterprise-D. In this episode, while Captain Jean-Luc Picard (Patrick Stewart) heads to a nearby Starbase to undergo surgery on his artificial heart, Commander William Riker (Jonathan Frakes) is in command of the Enterprise. The crew must deal with a Pakled starship, whose crew kidnaps Chief Engineer Geordi La Forge (LeVar Burton) and demands advanced technology in exchange for his safe return.

== Plot ==
Captain Jean-Luc Picard (Patrick Stewart) refuses to have his artificial heart replaced on board the Enterprise by Doctor Katherine Pulaski (Diana Muldaur), as he is concerned about his image with the crew. He instead heads to a nearby Starbase for the operation, travelling by shuttlecraft. Acting Ensign Wesley Crusher (Wil Wheaton) accompanies him, as he is due to undergo his Starfleet Academy entrance exams. Initially rebuffing Wesley's attempts to make conversation, Picard eventually softens and talks of his past. This includes the revelation that he received an artificial heart after being stabbed in the back by a Nausicaan in his days as a cocky young Starfleet cadet.

Meanwhile, the Enterprise encounters the Mondor, a Pakled ship. The aliens request help to fix their vessel. Based on the Pakleds' rudimentary communication skills and apparent lack of understanding of the basic operations of their ship, Commander William Riker (Jonathan Frakes) judges them to be inept and harmless, and agrees to send Chief Engineer Geordi La Forge (LeVar Burton) to assist them. After boarding the Pakled ship, La Forge repairs the navigational system, when main power fails. On the Enterprise, Counselor Deanna Troi (Marina Sirtis), an empath, warns Riker that La Forge is in danger, but Riker hesitates to act upon her warning, judging from the Pakleds' appearance that they are not dangerous. Upon finally completing the repairs, La Forge prepares to leave, but a Pakled incapacitates him with his own phaser, and raises the ship's shields. Lt. Commander Data (Brent Spiner) determines that the Pakleds have acquired advanced technology from other races, and the ship's malfunctions were a ruse. Riker demands they return La Forge, but the Pakleds refuse, and stun him again with his phaser. Riker and Lt. Worf (Michael Dorn) develop a ruse of their own, which they communicate to La Forge in code.

At the Starbase, complications arise during Picard's transplant, and the doctors realize that unless they can locate an expert with the necessary expertise, he will die. As Riker sets up the ruse, Worf receives a message from the Starbase that Picard is close to death. The Pakleds seek to attack the Enterprise, but La Forge persuades the Pakleds to delay firing until a specific range. In response, the Enterprise generates a spectacular but harmless pyrotechnic display, and La Forge simultaneously disables their weapon systems. The Pakleds, convinced they have been defeated, back down and allow La Forge's return and the Enterprise races to the Starbase. Picard is dismayed upon waking up to find that Pulaski has completed his procedure. While Pulaski assures him she will keep his secret, he returns to the Enterprise's bridge to applause, which he quickly silences.

== Production ==
"Samaritan Snare" was written by Robert L. McCullough from an outside pitch. McCullough would go on to become a producer during the final few seasons of the series. Executive producer Maurice Hurley was pleased with the episode, because it highlighted La Forge and he enjoyed working with Burton. This was the second and final episode featuring Lycia Naff as Ensign Sonya Gomez, following her appearance in the previous episode, "Q Who". It was also the second appearance in Star Trek: The Next Generation for Christopher Collins, who had played the Klingon Captain Kargan earlier in the second season in the episode "A Matter of Honor". He went on to make two appearances in Star Trek: Deep Space Nine, in the episodes "The Passenger" and "Blood Oath".

The production team had intended to build a set for the Captain's yacht from the Enterprise. However, the budget for the episode wouldn't stretch to building a new standing set and so the decision was made to use the existing shuttle set. A mistake was made in the changes to the script to accommodate the change, which resulted in Picard saying to Wesley that he was in shuttlebay two while standing in shuttlebay three as indicated by the large "3" seen on the floor on-screen. One of the elements mentioned in "Samaritan Snare" would be further explained in later episodes. The story of Picard's artificial heart was expanded upon in the episode "Tapestry" during the sixth season.

=== Pakleds ===
Initially, there was no clear idea of what the Pakleds should look like, other than that they should appear as harmless as possible. Director Les Landau described the aliens as "ugly and slow", and compared their motivation as "a need for things" which he said was a reflection of modern society.

With that in mind, portly actors were hired in order to give the impression of Tweedledum and Tweedledee from Lewis Carroll's Through the Looking-Glass. Makeup supervisor Michael Westmore then created a prosthetic design for the actors, intending to make them look "whimsical". Appliances were created for their cheeks, foreheads and the tip of the actor's noses. A further addition was the eyebrows, as Westmore wanted them to look permanently sad. The final step in the makeup process was the creation of sets of false upper teeth, which while Westmore suggested was not immediately noticeable upon watching the episode but he felt completed the overall look of the aliens. The design resulted in the aliens being described as Shar Peis by the crew.

The individual Pakleds in "Samaritan Snare" were named after the surnames of the person who pitched the episode and his best friend. Reginod and Grebnedlog are Doniger and Goldenberg spelled backwards. The Pakleds never featured again in The Next Generation, but were mentioned in "Brothers" as having rescued Lore following the events of "Datalore". Pakleds were seen in crowd scenes in Star Trek: The Next Generation, and in the background of the Deep Space Nine episodes "Rules of Acquisition" and "Playing God". They return as antagonists in the Star Trek: Lower Decks episode "No Small Parts" and later in "Kayshon, His Eyes Open", "The Spy Humongous", and "wej Duj", the last of which reveals them to be pawns of a rogue Klingon officer.

== Home media release ==
The first home media release of "Samaritan Snare" is on VHS cassette, appearing on October 12, 1994 in the United States and Canada. The episode was later included on the Star Trek: The Next Generation season two DVD box set, released on May 7, 2002. The most recent release was as part of the season two Blu-ray set on December 4, 2012.

== Reception ==
Dennis Bailey and David Bischoff disliked the first five minutes of "Samaritan Snare" so much that they were inspired to pitch their own story for The Next Generation. This eventually became the episode "Tin Man" in the third season. They said that the opening was "hokey", and also felt that several of the plot elements were "stupid" such as sending Picard to a Starbase where there were no doctors qualified to perform his surgery. They also criticised Troi's remark about La Forge being in danger, as she was completely ignored.

The episode has been given as an example of an idiot plot, with Dennis Bailey commenting that "none of the plot could have happened if all of the characters hadn't suddenly became morons that week", ignoring the advice of expert officers and disregarding elementary security procedures.

Mark Jones and Lance Parkin, in their book Beyond the Final Frontier: An Unauthorised Review of Star Trek, said that "Samaritan Snare" was "uneventful". They said that the conversation between Picard and Wesley had potential for later development, but "went nowhere". They said that while Picard's operation created some drama, this element was lost when the Pakleds were on screen.

In 2010, Zack Handlen of The A.V. Club gave the episode a B−.

In 2012, Wired magazine said this was one of the best episodes of Star Trek: The Next Generation.
