= Up the Long Ladder =

- Star Trek: The Next Generation episode
- Episode no.: Season 2 Episode 18
- Directed by: Winrich Kolbe
- Written by: Melinda M. Snodgrass
- Cinematography by: Edward R. Brown
- Production code: 144
- Original air date: May 22, 1989

Guest appearances
- Barrie Ingham – Danilo Odell; Jon De Vries – Wilson/Victor Granger; Rosalyn Landor – Brenna Odell; Colm Meaney – Miles O'Brien

Episode chronology
← Previous "Samaritan Snare"	Next → "Manhunt"
- Star Trek: The Next Generation season 2

"Up the Long Ladder" is the eighteenth episode of the second season of the syndicated American science fiction television show Star Trek: The Next Generation, the 44th episode overall, first broadcast on May 22, 1989.

Set in the 24th century, the series follows the adventures of the Starfleet crew of the Federation starship Enterprise-D. In this episode, the Enterprise becomes involved in two previously unknown Earth colonies' struggle for survival.

The episode was controversial as Riker's destruction of his clone, and his justification of it, were seen as pro-abortion arguments that were unusually harsh in tone. The result was the episode received backlash from pro-life groups that resulted in the episode receiving limited play in reruns.

== Plot ==
The Enterprise receives an automated distress call from a human colony on the planet Bringloid V, (Note: From brionglóid, the Irish language word for "dream") which is in danger from solar flares from its star. The colony turns out to have been founded by the crew of the SS Mariposa, (Note: Mariposa is the Spanish word for "butterfly") a freighter launched from Earth several hundred years earlier.

As the Enterprise approaches the planet, Worf collapses on the bridge. When he regains consciousness in sick bay, he is embarrassed to admit suffering a Klingon childhood illness equivalent to measles. Dr. Pulaski agrees to protect his privacy. In gratitude, Worf later approaches her to offer a Klingon tea ceremony. He warns that the tea is deadly to humans and explains it is just a gesture which would be important in his culture. Pulaski suggests he is a romantic and takes an antidote to allow herself to drink the tea with him safely.

The "Bringloidi" colony, now led by an Irishman named Danilo Odell and his hot-tempered daughter Brenna, are followers of an early 22nd-century philosopher who advocated returning to a pre-industrial agrarian lifestyle, and when taken aboard the Enterprise, must quickly adapt to the 24th-century technology. Odell informs Picard of another colony, also planted by the Mariposa. The Enterprise proceeds to the second colony—which has named itself "Mariposa" after their ship—half a light year away. The colony's Prime Minister, Wilson Granger, is happy to see the Enterprise and welcomes them to visit, so Commander Riker beams down with Lieutenant Worf and Chief Medical Officer Doctor Pulaski.

The Mariposa colony has kept their advanced technology, and appear refined and cultured in contrast to the Bringloidi's relatively primitive existence. Pulaski quickly ascertains that all of the inhabitants are clones. Granger reveals that their ship crashed while landing, and only five survivors were left to start the colony. As this was insufficient to establish a stable gene pool, and the survivors were all scientists, they turned exclusively to cloning instead and consequently no longer have any desire for biological reproduction. For almost three centuries, every Mariposan has been a clone derived from one of the five original colonists, and now the colony is in danger of dying out because of replicative fading: each subsequent generation introduces additional minor flaws in the genetic code, which within only a few more generations will make further clones nonviable.

The Mariposans ask the Enterprise crew for samples of their DNA to create new clones. Riker refuses, as he values his uniqueness, and Picard advises that the rest of the crew is likely to feel the same, so the Mariposans kidnap Riker and Pulaski to steal their DNA. Upon discovering this, the away team beams directly to the colony's cloning labs, where they are repulsed to find copies of themselves being grown, which Riker destroys. Granger is furious and appeals to Picard, but Pulaski argues that a new batch of clones will only delay the inevitable. Instead, she advises that they consider partnering with the Bringloidi to create a viable gene pool. Initially, each colony's leader treats the other society with disdain, but they eventually agree to merge their colonies and disparate cultures.

== Production ==
The episode was written by Melinda M. Snodgrass. The story was intended to be a commentary about immigration, because she hated the xenophobic attitude she was seeing, the whole "We don't want them because they're the wrong color, don't speak the language, or don't have the right religion." In her opinion "what makes America vibrant is the fact we have all these cultures."

However, the episode was seen as being a commentary on abortion, with Riker coldly murdering his clone and justifying it based on bodily autonomy (a common pro-choice argument). Many pro-life groups criticized the plotline as promoting abortion, and to an extreme degree, as Riker's clone was not attached to his body or dependent on him at all when he destroyed it in the name of "bodily autonomy."

The episode was originally titled "Send in the Clones". The title "Up the Long Ladder" is taken from an Irish anti-Protestant rhyme: "Up the long ladder, Down the short rope. To hell with King Billy! Three cheers for the Pope!"

== Reception ==
Zack Handlen of The A.V. Club gave the episode a grade C. He praised the Worf and Pulaski scenes, and said "they're good enough that I would champion them even if they hadn't stood out in such stark contrast to the rest of this crap heap." He called out the "Space Irish" as yet another example of Star Trek lapsing into cultural cliché and tedious stereotypes, and thought the cloning storyline wasn't awful, but that the two storylines felt like they were grafted onto one another because neither was developed enough to fill a full episode. Keith R. A. DeCandido of Tor.com criticized the Irish stereotypes, and said the clones are boring. He concedes the episode is funny, "but the laughter does catch in your throat when you realize just how dumb it is." He gave it 4 out of 10. James Hunt of Den of Geek called the Irish characters "painfully stereotypical" although he did find the episode funny. He said it wasn't as bad as season one, but that it was strange to see such a poorly developed episode showing up this late in the series. Jamahl Epsicokhan of Jammer's Reviews gave it 1.5 out of 4 and called it "a colossal mess of a show, mixing serious (albeit unrealized) science fiction with broad, less-than-funny comedy."

In 2014, Ars Technica picked this as one of the "worst TNG episode[s]" and called it an "utterly forgettable story about cloning and totalitarianism" but said the lecherous smirking Riker was the worst part of it. The reviewer thought the subplot with Worf and Dr. Pulaski was quite good, and the tea ritual scene "actually showed the differences between two cultures quickly and effectively, without resorting to shoddy jokes and Riker screen time."

In 2017, Io9 noted "Up the Long Ladder" for being one of the weirdest TNG adventures, with the Enterprise-D encountering people from the planet Bringloid V, and also from a planet of clones that was struggling to have children. Freelance writer Rob Bricken cited this episode as his personal choice for worst episode of the entire series, arguing "it manages to be racist, sexist, and terrible sci-fi, all at once."
