= Manhunt (Star Trek: The Next Generation) =

- Star Trek: The Next Generation episode
- Episode no.: Season 2 Episode 19
- Directed by: Rob Bowman
- Written by: Terry Devereaux
- Cinematography by: Edward R. Brown
- Production code: 145
- Original air date: June 19, 1989

Guest appearances
- Majel Barrett – Lwaxana Troi / Computer Voice; Robert Costanzo – Slade Bender; Carel Struycken – Mr. Homn; Rod Arrants – Rex; Colm Meaney – Miles O'Brien; Robert O'Reilly – Scarface; Rhonda Aldrich – Madeline; Mick Fleetwood – Antedean dignitary

Episode chronology
← Previous "Up the Long Ladder"	Next → "The Emissary"
- Star Trek: The Next Generation season 2

"Manhunt" is the nineteenth episode of the second season of the American science fiction television series Star Trek: The Next Generation, the 45th episode overall, originally broadcast on June 19, 1989.

Set in the 24th century, the series follows the adventures of the Starfleet crew of the Federation starship Enterprise-D. In this episode, the Enterprise must transport delegates to a conference, one of whom is an extremely man-hungry Lwaxana Troi with eyes for Captain Picard.

Mick Fleetwood, drummer and namesake of the British-American rock band Fleetwood Mac appears, in this episode only and in heavy makeup, as an Antedean dignitary.

== Plot ==
The Federation starship Enterprise is ordered to escort two Antedean ambassadors to an important conference on the planet Pacifica. The Antedeans are transported aboard in a self-induced catatonic state—to reduce the stress of space travel—along with a plentiful food supply for when they awaken, in accordance with their custom.

En route, the Enterprise is ordered to rendezvous with a shuttlecraft carrying the Betazoid telepath ambassador Lwaxana Troi, mother of ship's counselor Deanna Troi, and her mute manservant Mr. Homn. Due to his previous experience with her (see "Haven"), Captain Jean-Luc Picard does not entirely welcome Lwaxana's presence, as she tends to be overbearing and lack tact, but Starfleet's instructions are that she be afforded full diplomatic courtesy. Lwaxana invites Picard to dinner, and he is surprised to find that rather than the formal diplomatic function for the entire senior staff that he expected, it is a romantic setting for just the two of them. Picard evades her advances, inviting android Lieutenant Commander Data to join them, and manipulating him into taking over the conversation with long-winded anecdotes.

Troi explains that her mother has entered "The Phase": a stage in the life of a Betazoid woman when her sex drive drastically increases, and that she is searching for a new husband (having been long-since widowed). Moreover, her telepathy is clouded as a side effect, causing her to misread Picard's thoughts as indicating sexual desire for her. Picard retreats to the Holodeck to hide from her, leaving Commander Riker in charge. Frustrated by Picard's absence, Lwaxana targets Riker instead, and makes a surprise announcement to the bridge crew that they will be married.

The Antedeans have meanwhile revived, and Riker goes to the holodeck to notify Picard. Lwaxana follows, and having determined that Riker is not interested either, switches her attention to a character from Picard's Dixon Hill simulation, who returns her affections. Picard somewhat reluctantly informs her that her new husband-to-be is merely a holographic projection.

When the ship arrives at the conference and collected ambassadors prepare to beam down to the planet, Lwaxana offhandedly informs the crew that the Antedeans are actually assassins. Though they deny this, scans show they are carrying explosives, just as Lwaxana indicated, and they are taken into custody. She remarks that while she did not find a new husband, at least she saved the conference, and as she is beaming away, playfully chastises Picard for having "such naughty thoughts" about her, much to his dismay.

== Production ==
Musician Mick Fleetwood of the group Fleetwood Mac played one of the Antedean ambassadors, and was a huge fan of Star Trek. He did not mind that it was only a small part, so long as his character got to beam down or beam up. He had to shave off his beard to allow for the prosthetics makeup.

Robert O'Reilly guest starred as Scarface in the Dixon Hill holodeck program. He later went on to play the Klingon Gowron.

== Reception ==
"Manhunt" received a Nielsen rating of 8.9 and a ranking of 3 making it, according to the Nielsen system, towards the lower end of views for a first run Star Trek: The Next Generation episode.

Zack Handlen of The A.V. Club gave the episode a grade C. Keith R. A. DeCandido of Tor.com gave the episode 2 out of 10

In 2019, Den of Geek noted this episode for including an awkward romance between Picard and Lwaxana Troi.

In 2017, SyFy rated the Antedeans featured in this episode, one of the top 11 most bizarre aliens of Star Trek: The Next Generation, remarking they were "weirder than Admiral Ackbar."

In 2019, Screen Rant ranked "Manhunt" the 3rd funniest episode of The Next Generation.
