= Idiot plot =

Pejorative term in literary criticism

In literary criticism, an idiot plot is a fictional storyline which is "kept in motion solely by virtue of the fact that everybody involved is an idiot", and where the story would quickly end, or possibly not even happen, if this were not the case. It is a narrative in which the conflict derives from the characters not recognizing or not being told key information that would resolve the conflict, often owing to plot contrivance. In such plots, the primary preventative of the conflict's resolution is the characters' constant avoidance of or obliviousness to said conflict throughout the plot, even if it was already obvious to the reader (or viewer). All of the characters in such a plot are dubbed "idiots" for their being too obtuse to quickly resolve the conflict.

== History ==
Science fiction writer and critic Damon Knight, in his 1956 collection In Search of Wonder, says that the term may have originated with author James Blish. Knight went on to coin the term second-order idiot plot as a narrative "in which not merely the principals, but everybody in the whole society has to be a grade-A idiot, or the story couldn't happen". The term was later popularized by film critic (and longtime science fiction fan) Roger Ebert.

== Usage ==
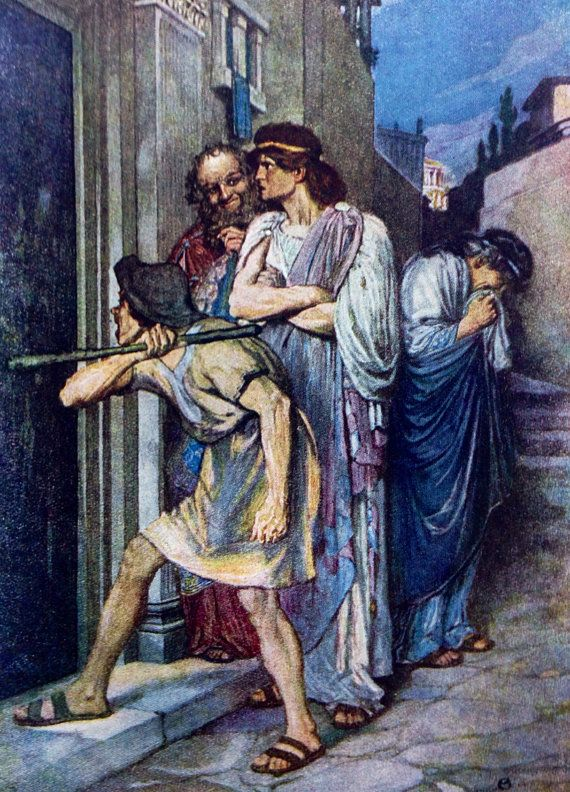
A scene from Shakespeare's The Comedy of Errors where Antipholus's servants refuse to open the door to his own home. They believe him to already be inside, having previously welcomed his twin into the house. Unable to resolve this misunderstanding, Antipholus leaves.

Critic Roger Ebert wrote in 2005: "I can forgive and even embrace an Idiot Plot in its proper place (consider Astaire and Rogers in Top Hat). But when the characters have depth and their decisions have consequences, I grow restless when their misunderstandings could be ended by words that the screenplay refuses to allow them to utter." In his 1987 review of comedy The Secret of My Success, Ebert argues that most storylines about mistaken identity rely heavily on being an idiot plot.

Writing in 2013, author David Brin explored one variation of the idiot plot. In most adventure films and novels, the writers and directors have an imperative to keep their protagonists in jeopardy. This becomes difficult if they are surrounded by skilled professionals, paid to intervene and help if called. Hence, storytellers feel compelled to separate their characters from meaningful help, so that any assistance they receive is either late or else below the level of danger offered by the antagonists. The more powerful the villains, the more competent that help is allowed to be. "But for the most part, institutions and your neighbors are portrayed as sheep, so that only the hero's actions truly matter."

Alternate formulations describe only the protagonist as being an idiot.

== Examples ==
- Roger Ebert described the 1935 film Top Hat as an idiot plot, depending as it does on "a misunderstanding that is all but impossible", relying on the fact that Ginger Rogers' character has somehow never met her best friend's husband, and is able to mistake a complete stranger (played by Fred Astaire) for him, and for that misunderstanding to continue without being questioned. Ebert noted that the situation "could be cleared up at any moment by one line of sensible dialogue", yet the writers deliberately avoid doing so to keep the plot in motion.
- Ebert also said that the 2010 romcom The Back-up Plan has an idiot plot, citing the two main characters' repeated romantic breakups after "one or the other idiotically misunderstands dialogue that is crystal clear for everyone in the audience."
- Writer Dennis Russell Bailey called the Star Trek: The Next Generation episode "Samaritan Snare" an idiot plot, inasmuch as "none of the plot could have happened if all of the characters hadn't suddenly became morons that week." The episode depicts the starship Enterprise falling victim to a kidnapping by slow-witted aliens after the commanding officer repeatedly ignores warnings from senior officers.

== See also ==
- Plot hole
- Farce
