= Katherine Pulaski =

Fictional character, chief medical officer in Star Trek: The Next Generation

- Star Trek character
- Commander Katherine Pulaski
- First appearance: "The Child" (1988)
- Last appearance: "Shades of Gray" (1989)
- Created by: Gene Roddenberry; Jaron Summers; Jon Povill; Maurice Hurley
- Portrayed by: Diana Muldaur

In-universe information
- Species: Human
- Title: Doctor
- Affiliation: United Federation of Planets; Starfleet
- Significant other: Kyle Riker
- Posting: USS Enterprise-D (Season 2)
- Position: Chief Medical Officer
- Rank: Commander

Dr. Katherine Pulaski is a fictional medical doctor in the American science fiction television series Star Trek: The Next Generation. She served a rotation as the chief medical officer aboard the Federation starship USS Enterprise-D. During her time on the ship, her medical skills saved the lives of both Captain Jean-Luc Picard and Commander William Riker. She inadvertently caused Geordi LaForge to create a hologram of Professor Moriarty that became self-aware, after a bet involving the abilities of Lt. Commander Data. Pulaski seemed averse to most new technology and preferred to avoid the transporter, but was forced to rely on it to save her own life from a genetically modified infection. Before arriving on the Enterprise-D, she previously served on the USS Repulse. For a time in her past, she was romantically involved with William Riker's father, Kyle Riker, with whom she has maintained a friendship.

Portrayed by actress Diana Muldaur, Pulaski replaced the character of Commander Beverly Crusher for the second season after Gates McFadden's contract was not renewed. Thus, Pulaski first appeared in the second season opener "The Child", and made her final appearance in the closing episode of the season, "Shades of Gray". Before playing the role of Pulaski on The Next Generation, Muldaur appeared in the original Star Trek, playing different characters in the episodes "Return to Tomorrow" and "Is There in Truth No Beauty?" She later worked with series creator Gene Roddenberry on a pilot for the series Planet Earth. McFadden returned to replace Muldaur in the third season, reprising her role as Dr. Crusher for the remainder of the series.

Reviewers criticized Pulaski's approach, as well as her inability to fit in with the crew. Critics noted that her transporter phobia was reminiscent of Dr. Leonard McCoy from the original Star Trek, as was her relationship with Data; Pulaski's interaction with Data raised comparisons to that of McCoy and Spock from the original Star Trek. Episodes featuring Pulaski in a leading role produced divided opinions among critics, with some describing "Unnatural Selection" as a key episode while others argued that it showed only the negative side of her role.

== Concept and development ==
Towards the end of the first season of Star Trek: The Next Generation, staff members convinced Gene Roddenberry to drop Gates McFadden as Dr. Beverly Crusher from the show. Executive producer Rick Berman opposed this decision. To allow for McFadden's return in the future, Roddenberry wrote Crusher's character out rather than killing her. McFadden's departure led to an opening for a new cast member. The producers contacted actress Diana Muldaur, unaware of her past involvement with Roddenberry's Star Trek and Planet Earth pilot. In the original Star Trek series, Muldaur played the role of a doctor in two episodes: as Dr. Ann Mulhall in "Return to Tomorrow", and as Dr. Miranda Jones in "Is There in Truth No Beauty?" Muldaur also worked on the pilot for Planet Earth after getting to know Roddenberry and his wife, Majel Barrett, through their annual Star Trek Christmas parties.

Muldaur was not required to audition for the role of Pulaski. Instead, she was given 15 VHS cassettes of the first season. She found it "very exciting", noting it "got better and better and better" as she watched it. Christina Pickles was also considered for the part of Pulaski, a decision Berman described as "very tough". Muldaur finally agreed to play the role, but asked Roddenberry to change the name of the character to Kate, which became Katherine.

Pulaski debuted in the second season episode "The Child", along with Whoopi Goldberg making her first appearance as Guinan in the same episode. Even though Muldaur was a regular character on The Next Generation, she was listed in the opening credits as a "Special Guest Star". Muldaur left the series at the end of season 2. Muldaur submitted clips from her episode "Unnatural Selection" to L.A. Law producers, who cast her as Rosalind Shays on that show. Gates McFadden returned to Star Trek: The Next Generation to continue her role as Dr. Crusher, a role she played for the remainder of the series.

== Appearances ==
Pulaski's background is touched upon in the episode "The Icarus Factor". She is thrice divorced and was previously romantically involved with Commander William Riker's father Kyle Riker (Mitchell Ryan), after she was part of a rescue team responding to a Tholian attack on a Federation Starbase. She realised that a romantic relationship with Riker would not work, but they remained friends. Directly prior to serving on the Enterprise-D Pulaski served on the USS Repulse.

In, "Elementary, Dear Data" she challenges Lt. Cmdr Data to solve an original Sherlock Holmes mystery on the holodeck. He accepts her challenge, which results in the creation of a self-aware hologram of Professor Moriarty (Daniel Davis). Pulaski joins Data and Lieutenant Geordi La Forge (LeVar Burton), but is captured by Moriarty who also takes over control of the Enterprise. Moriarty demands that they find a way to enable him to leave the holodeck, but is persuaded by Captain Jean-Luc Picard (Patrick Stewart) to release control and be stored within the ship's computer memory until a means can be found to grant his wish.

Pulaski's apprehension at using the transporter was evident in "The Schizoid Man", where Dr. Selar (Suzie Plakson) went with the away team instead of Pulaski, as it required her to beam over to a transport vessel. However, the transporter would later save Pulaski's life in "Unnatural Selection", after she was infected with a disease from the planet Gagarin IV that accelerated her aging process. The transporter is used to remove the infection and she is returned to health.

She demonstrates her medical expertise on several occasions. In "Time Squared", Pulaski discovers that the duplicate Captain Picard is out of sync in time and will slowly improve until he returns to the point at which he left. In the episode "Pen Pals", Picard orders Pulaski to wipe the memories of a young girl called Sarjenka, whom Data had been corresponding with and helping in violation of the prime directive. In "Samaritan Snare", she is summoned to Starbase 515 to perform heart surgery on Captain Picard, as she is the most experienced surgeon nearby. This is despite Picard's wish for her not to perform the surgery, due to his concern with the image it might give to the crew.

When the Enterprise arrives at the lost colony of Mariposa in "Up the Long Ladder", the Mariposans kidnap Pulaski and Commander William Riker (Jonathan Frakes) and steal their DNA to clone new members of their colony. Although technologically advanced, the Mariposans lack genetic diversity. When Pulaski and Riker discover the clones, they destroy them. Picard helps resolve the dispute by suggesting the Mariposans allow the Bringloidi, a preindustrial, rural people whose colony was destroyed, to migrate to their world. The Mariposans, however, have relied on cloning for 300 years, and no longer sexually reproduce. Pulaski notes that with time, they will become familiar with the practice once again, and recommends that the Mariposans form large, group marriages with the Bringloidi to create a healthy population.

Following Data's defeat at a game of stratagema in "Peak Performance", Pulaski and Counselor Deanna Troi (Marina Sirtis) attempt to console him, but it is left to Captain Picard to convince Data that he is not malfunctioning. Pulaski's final appearance on The Next Generation was in the episode "Shades of Gray". When Commander Riker falls ill to a dangerous virus during an away team mission, Pulaski drives out the virus with a device that stimulates his memory centre. After she discovers that negative memories are more effective in removing the virus, she uses memories of fear and survival to save Riker's life.

In the alternative future timeline portrayed in "Endgame", the Star Trek: Voyager finale, Pulaski is said to have worked at the Starfleet Medical facility in San Francisco.

=== Novels ===
Pulaski appears in several books of the non-canon novel series based on the adventures of the crew in The Next Generation and elsewhere in the same time period. In Peter David's novel Vendetta (1991), Pulaski is reassigned to the Repulse under Captain Taggart following her departure from the Enterprise. In Star Trek: Progress (2006), a Starfleet Corps of Engineers book by Terri Osborne, Pulaski is on board the USS Progress when it visits Drema IV, as she wants to check up on the progress of Sarjenka, a young girl from The Next Generation episode "Pen Pals". Pulaski also appeared alongside Wesley Crusher and Guinan in Michael Jan Friedman's "All Good Things..." (1994), a novelisation of The Next Generation series finale.

== Reception and commentary ==
In their 1998 book, Star Trek 101, Terry J. Erdmann and Paula M. Block called "Unnatural Selection" the key Pulaski episode. Science fiction writer Keith DeCandido described Pulaski as "annoying" and noted that this feeling was mirrored on screen by Captain Picard. In Science Fiction Television: A History, author M. Keith Booker observed that "Pulaski never quite meshed with the rest of the crew".

The events of "Elementary Dear Data" led film professor Zoran Samardžija to suggest that Pulaski may have been inspired by the works of Friedrich Nietzsche. In Sherlock Holmes and Philosophy: The Footprints of a Gigantic Mind (2011), Samardžija notes that Pulaski's argument that Data lacks intuition is reminiscent of parts of Nietzsche's 1878 work Human, All Too Human. The relationship between Pulaski and Data was further considered by Rhonda V. Wilcox in her article "Dating Data: Miscegenation in Star Trek: The Next Generation" (1993). Wilcox notes that Pulaski "frequently challenges Data in terms of his machine nature." She compares Data's emotionless state to slavery due to the reference in "The Child" to Maya Angelou's 1969 work I Know Why the Caged Bird Sings.

In 2016, Pulaski was ranked as the 39th most important character of Starfleet within the Star Trek science fiction universe by Wired magazine, out of 100 characters. In 2019, she was listed as one of the underrated characters of the Star Trek universe by CBS.
