= Lycia Naff =

American dancer, actress, journalist (born 1962)

- Born: August 29, 1962 (age 64)
- Occupations: Dancer; actress; journalist
- Years active: 1982–present
- Television: Star Trek: The Next Generation

Lycia Naff (born August 29, 1962) is an American dancer, actress, and journalist. She is best known as an actress for a two-episode role as Ensign Sonya Gomez on Star Trek: The Next Generation and for an appearance as a three-breasted sex worker in Total Recall (1990). Her journalism career includes early work on the Bill Cosby sexual assault cases story in 2014 with her interview of actress and rape survivor Barbara Bowman.

== Acting career ==
Her acting career began as a dancer in the 1982 television series Fame. She appeared as a sex worker named Dixie in the 1987 film Lethal Weapon and as TC in Troma's 1989 Chopper Chicks in Zombietown. In 1989 she appeared as Ensign Sonya Gomez in two episodes of the second season of Star Trek: The Next Generation, a role she would return to in 2021 to voice Captain Sonya Gomez on the animated series Star Trek: Lower Decks.

Her small role as Mary, a triple-breasted mutant sex worker in Paul Verhoeven's 1990 motion picture Total Recall, gained her immediate fame and interview requests from even Johnny Carson to appear on his show, all of which she turned down, only to later regret having done so. Afterwards, she earned a Daytime Emmy nomination for her part in the 1990 ABC Afterschool Special "The Perfect Date".

In 2007 she guest starred in Without a Trace. She also appeared in recurring episodes of St. Elsewhere, Hunter, General Hospital and The Young and the Restless.

== Journalism career ==
As her acting career took a downturn in the mid-1990s, she went to study journalism at Florida Atlantic University, graduating from then Palm Beach Atlantic College. She has since worked as a reporter for publications like The Palm Beach Post, Sun Sentinel, The Miami Herald, and People.

In 2014, Naff interviewed the first of Bill Cosby's rape victims and survivors, actress Barbara Bowman.

== Filmography ==
=== Film ===
Lycia Naff film credits
Year	Title	Role
1985	Final Jeopardy	Vickie
1986	The Clan of the Cave Bear	Uba
1987	Lethal Weapon	Dixie
1990	Total Recall	Mary
1991	Chopper Chicks in Zombietown	T.C.

=== Television ===
Lycia Naff television credits
Year	Title	Role	Notes
1982, 1983, 1986	Fame	Moira / Fame dancer / Susan	7 episodes
1983	The Jeffersons	Donna	Episode: "I Do, I Don't"
1984	Masquerade		Episode: "Five Days"
1985	Heart of a Champion: The Ray Mancini Story	Cynthia	TV movie
1985	Love, Mary	Delia	TV movie
1985	St. Elsewhere	Maddy	3 episodes
1985	Hunter	Sally LaPone	Episodes: "The Snow Queen" Parts 1 & 2
1985	Hardcastle and McCormick	Ali Casir	Episode: "Mirage a Trois"
1985	Hell Town	Kate	Episode: "A Wedding in Hell Town"
1987	Max Headroom	Jaxy	Episode: "The Blanks"
1988	The Equalizer	Amy	Episode: "The Child Broker"
1988	Duet	Natalie	Episode: "Baby Talk"
1989	Hard Time on Planet Earth	Connie Russo	Episode: "Battle of the Sexes"
1989	Star Trek: The Next Generation	Ensign Sonya Gomez	Episodes: "Q Who", "Samaritan Snare"
1989	General Hospital	Phoebe Dawson	12 episodes
1990	Baywatch	Wanda	Episode: "Home Cort"
1990	Return to Green Acres	B.B.	TV movie
1990	The Flash	Lila	Episode: "Pilot"
1990	ABC Afterschool Special	Bernice Sherman	Episode: "The Perfect Date"
1991	Father Dowling Mysteries	Michele	Episode: "The Missing Witness Mystery"
1991	Shades of LA	Cherry	Episode: "Cross the Center Line"
1991	Law & Order	Mimi Sternhagen	Episode: "Asylum"
2007	Without a Trace	Lynn Neyer	Episode: "Connections"
2008	Denise Richards: It's Complicated	Herself	Episode: "Denise vs. Tabloids"
2008	Redemption Song	Herself	
2008	Ghost Whisperer	Butcher	Episode: "Pieces of You"
2021	Star Trek: Lower Decks	Captain Sonya Gomez	Episode: "First First Contact" (voice role)

== Awards and nominations ==
Awards nominations:

- 1989: Daytime Emmy: Outstanding Performer in a Children's Special for the ABC Afterschool Special episode "The Perfect Date"
