= The Emissary (Star Trek: The Next Generation) =

- Star Trek: The Next Generation episode
- Episode no.: Season 2 Episode 20
- Directed by: Cliff Bole
- Story by: Thomas H. Calder
- Teleplay by: Richard Manning; Hans Beimler
- Cinematography by: Edward R. Brown
- Production code: 146
- Original air date: June 26, 1989

Guest appearances
- Suzie Plakson – K'Ehleyr; Lance LeGault – K'Temoc; Georgann Johnson – Adm. Gromek; Colm Meaney – Miles O'Brien; Anne Elizabeth Ramsay – Clancy; Diedrich Bader – Tactical Crewman

Episode chronology
← Previous "Manhunt"	Next → "Peak Performance"
- Star Trek: The Next Generation season 2

"The Emissary" is the twentieth episode of the second season of the American science fiction television series Star Trek: The Next Generation, the 46th episode overall, first airing on June 26, 1989.

Set in the 24th century, the series follows the adventures of the Starfleet crew of the Federation starship Enterprise-D. In this episode, the Enterprise is sent a half-Klingon, half-human emissary to help them deal with a three-quarter century-old Klingon sleeper-ship who believes they are still at war with the Federation.

This episode guest stars Suzie Plakson as the eponymous emissary, which established a romantic interest for Worf.

== Plot ==
The Enterprise, under the command of Captain Jean-Luc Picard, rendezvouses with a Federation emissary: K'Ehleyr, a half-Klingon half-human woman who has a history with Lt. Worf. K'Ehleyr informs the command staff that Starfleet has detected a Klingon battlecruiser called the T'Ong, whose crew has been in suspended animation for over 75 years, since the Klingons and the Federation were at war. Its crew are about to awaken, at which point it is feared they will attack the nearest Federation outpost. As the nearest Klingon ship is three days away, the Enterprise is to intercept them instead. Though K'Ehleyr believes that any attempt to reason with the Klingons will fail, and advises that Picard plan to destroy the ship, Picard disagrees and orders the staff to come up with peaceful alternatives.

Picard orders Worf to work with K'Ehleyr over Worf's objections. Worf and his ex-lover have a heated argument, barely managing to concentrate on their task. At Counselor Troi's suggestion, K'Ehleyr goes to the holodeck to vent her frustrations in one of Worf's hand-to-hand combat simulations. Worf finds her there and joins her, and, stimulated by the battle, they mate. Following tradition, Worf starts the Klingon vow of marriage, but K'Ehleyr refuses to take the vow and storms out.

When the T'Ong is detected, it fires on the Enterprise, cloaks, and moves away. The Enterprise is able to track the older vessel and pursues it. K'Ehleyr urges Picard to let the Klingons die with honor, in battle. However, Worf comes up with another option: Worf and K'Ehleyr, clad in Klingon command uniforms, appear as captain and first officer of the Enterprise, informing Captain K'Temoc of the T'Ong that the war is over and ordering them to surrender. K'Temoc initially refuses, but when Worf, in typical Klingon manner, shows his resolve and threatens to destroy the T'Ong, K'Temoc grudgingly agrees.

K'Ehleyr transports to the T'Ong to begin the process of acclimating the Klingons to life in the 24th century and await the arrival of the Klingon escort. Before departing, she admits to Worf that she was tempted to take the marriage vow with him, and implies that their paths will cross again.

== Writing ==
The script was written by Richard Manning and Hans Beimler, originating on a story by Thomas H. Calder, according to The Star Trek Encyclopedia by Okuda.

== Reception ==
In 2017, Comic Book Resources ranked this Worf and K'Ehleyr as the ninth best romantic relationship of the Star Trek franchise up to that time, noting that they reunite in "Reunion".

That same year, Den of Geek ranked this episode as one of top 25 "must watch" episodes of Star Trek: The Next Generation. In 2017, Daily Dot recommended this as a Star Trek Klingon alien themed episode to prepare for Star Trek: Discovery, also pointing out "Reunion" as a sequel to this episode.

In 2019, Den of Geek noted this episode for featuring romantic elements. They also ranked actress Suzi Plakson, who plays K'Ehleyr in this and "Reunion" as one of the top ten guest stars on Star Trek: The Next Generation.
