= The Icarus Factor =

- Star Trek: The Next Generation episode
- Episode no.: Season 2 Episode 14
- Directed by: Robert Iscove
- Story by: David Assael
- Teleplay by: David Assael; Robert L. McCullough
- Cinematography by: Edward R. Brown
- Production code: 140
- Original air date: April 24, 1989

Guest appearances
- Colm Meaney – Miles O'Brien; Mitchell Ryan – Kyle Riker; Lance Spellerberg – Herbert

Episode chronology
← Previous "Time Squared"	Next → "Pen Pals"
- Star Trek: The Next Generation season 2

"The Icarus Factor" is the fourteenth episode of the second season of the American science fiction television series Star Trek: The Next Generation. It is the 40th episode overall, first broadcast on April 24, 1989. Set in the 24th century, the series follows the adventures of the Starfleet crew of the Federation starship Enterprise-D.

In this episode, the Enterprise's first officer William Riker must decide whether to accept command of his own starship, and negative feelings surface when his estranged father arrives to brief him on the mission. Meanwhile, crew members Wesley Crusher, Geordi La Forge and Data attempt to determine why Lt. Worf, a Klingon, seems more agitated than usual, and discover that he is upset over not being able to participate in an important Klingon ritual.

== Plot ==
While the Enterprise, under the command of Captain Jean-Luc Picard, is en route to Starbase Montgomery to run diagnostics on its engines, Picard receives a message from Starfleet offering Riker a command of his own, the Aries, on a potentially dangerous exploration mission in a distant sector. Picard advises Riker that while the Enterprise is a prestigious assignment, it cannot replace the experience of having one's own command, and gives him 12 hours—the duration of their stop at the starbase—to decide. Riker's decision is complicated by the fact that the civilian adviser Starfleet has sent to brief him on his mission turns out to be his father, Kyle Riker (Mitchell Ryan), with whom he has an antagonistic relationship.

Kyle makes several attempts to reconcile but is rebuffed by Will; the tension between the two finally boils over, and they agree to a match of Anbo-jyutsu, a form of martial arts in which the two had sparred while Will was growing up. They continue to argue during the match, with Will venting his bitterness over the death of his mother. Will interrupts the match, claiming that Kyle has used an illegal move, and realizes that Kyle had only been able to beat him in his youth by cheating. Kyle admits as much, saying that he had realized it was the only way to keep Will interested in the sport. The two are finally able to talk and reconcile, and Will admits he is glad his father came. Will decides that "[f]or now, the best place for me to be is here," on the Enterprise.

Meanwhile, Acting Ensign Wesley Crusher notices that Worf is acting particularly agitated, and enlists the help of Chief Engineer La Forge and Commander Data to find out why. The trio eventually learn that Worf is approaching the tenth anniversary of his Age of Ascension; Klingons are expected to celebrate the day with a ritual administered by their own kind. Wesley, Geordi, and Data program the holodeck as a site for the ritual, in which Worf must traverse a gauntlet of Klingon warriors and endure jolts from the pain sticks they carry. Surprised at the effort, Worf recites vows of honor as he walks the path as his crewmates observe, and he thanks them at its end for honoring him in this fashion.

== Production ==
The title of the episode is derived from Greek mythology, and the story of Daedalus and his son Icarus.

The episode was directed by Robert Iscove. The story idea came from David Assael. The teleplay was credited to David Assael and Robert L. McCullough. McCullough said he was handed an outline of a father–son story for Riker and asked to rewrite it. He wanted there to be a confrontation and then for them to reconcile after. He used what he knew of karate philosophy to add to the fight scene in the fictional art of anbo-jyutsu. Jonathan Frakes liked the script and appreciated being at the center of the story. At a cast read-through of the script, Patrick Stewart made it clear he did not like it, and, according to McCullough, said, "This is absolute bullshit! We can't do this."

Entertainment Tonight co-host John Tesh, in an uncredited appearance, plays a holographic Klingon in the ritual scene, having volunteered for any part on the show months previously.

Anbo-jitsu (or anbo-jyutsu), the fictitious sport shown in this episode, involves fighting with staffs while blindfolded. In Japanese, "An" means dark (i.e. blindfolded), "Bo" means staff, and "Jyutsu" means technique or skill. While it is written in the script as "Anbo-jyutsu", Kyle and William Riker pronounce it as "Anbo-jitsu". The banners around the arena are written in Japanese and make reference to various Japanese characters and shows.

== Reception ==
This episode was noted for the tensions between Commander Riker and his father, which culminates in a round of Anbo-jyutsu, a fictional martial arts form from the Star Trek future. Keith R. A. DeCandido of Tor.com gave the episode a rating of 3 out of 10. Zack Handlen of The A.V. Club gave the episode a C+ in his review, calling it "pretty dreadful", with the exception of Worf's story.
