= The Royale =

- Star Trek: The Next Generation episode
- Episode no.: Season 2 Episode 12
- Directed by: Cliff Bole
- Written by: Tracy Tormé (as Keith Mills)
- Cinematography by: Edward R. Brown
- Production code: 138
- Original air date: March 27, 1989

Guest appearances
- Sam Anderson – Assistant Manager; Jill Jacobson – Vanessa; Leo Garcia – Bellboy; Noble Willingham – Texas; Colm Meaney – Miles O'Brien; Gregory Beecroft – Mickey D

Episode chronology
← Previous "Contagion"	Next → "Time Squared"
- Star Trek: The Next Generation season 2

"The Royale" is the twelfth episode of the second season of the American science fiction television series Star Trek: The Next Generation, the 38th episode overall. It was originally released on March 27, 1989, in broadcast syndication.

Set in the 24th century, the series follows the adventures of the Starfleet crew of the Federation starship Enterprise-D. In this episode, Riker, Data, and Worf become trapped in a strange hotel on a planet otherwise incapable of supporting human life.

== Plot ==
The episode opens with a discussion between Captain Picard and Commander Riker about Fermat's Last Theorem, which in the canon of the series had remained unsolved for 800 years (the theorem was proved in 1995, six years after the episode aired).

Following a tip from a Klingon ship, the Federation starship Enterprise, under the command of Captain Jean-Luc Picard, finds debris from an Earth ship orbiting an uninhabitable alien planet. A sample of the debris beamed aboard shows NASA markings and a 52-star American flag, dating the ship to the mid-to-late 21st century and establishing that it had traveled far beyond the capability of ships of that era. Scans of the planet reveal a small anomalous area capable of supporting human life, so Commander Riker, Lt. Worf, and Lt. Commander Data beam down to investigate, and find a revolving door alone in a dark void. Upon entering, they find themselves in an old Earth-style hotel and casino called The Royale, where they are cut off from contact with the Enterprise.

The away team soon discovers they are trapped inside the casino, and after making unsuccessful attempts to leave, they decide to explore the building. In a hotel room, they find the desiccated but preserved remains of Col. Stephen Richey, NASA astronaut, and a pulp novel entitled Hotel Royale. Upon reading Richey's diary, they learn that his ship had launched in 2037 but was accidentally contaminated by an unknown alien race, then transported across the galaxy; he was the only survivor. Taking pity on Richey, the aliens created The Royale for him, thinking the novel's story represented humans' preferred way of living, whereas Richey found it unbearable due to the poor quality of the novel. He lived there until his death, and his remains have been in the room for the last 283 years.

After re-establishing limited contact with the Enterprise, Riker, Data and Worf realize that the plot has been recreated in detail by the aliens and is playing out around them, and surmise that they might be able to leave if the story dictates that they do so. They assume the role of a trio of foreign investors described in the novel, who eventually leave the hotel after buying it out for $12.5 million. Data begins to play craps, using his winnings from an earlier visit to the blackjack table, but soon senses that the dice are loaded to favor the house. With his strength, he compresses them to readjust their weight distribution in his favor, then goes on a winning streak that breaks the bank and wins over $24 million. The three Starfleet officers then announce themselves as the foreign investors and buy the hotel with their winnings, give the rest of the money away to the staff and other gamblers, and depart as stated in the novel. After they return to the Enterprise, Riker and Picard speculate on the alien contamination of Richey's ship and how it could have ended up so far from Earth. Picard muses that the entire incident is a puzzle they may never be able to solve, similar to Fermat's Last Theorem.

== Reception ==
Zack Handlen of The A.V. Club rated it B and wrote that the episode is "watchable" but does not live up to his memories. Keith R. A. DeCandido of Tor.com rated the episode 5 out of 10.

In 2019, Screen Rant ranked "The Royale" one of the ten funniest episodes of Star Trek: The Next Generation.

== See also ==
- It was a dark and stormy night, referenced by the first line of the Hotel Royale novel
