= Joseph L. Scanlan =

American television director (1929–2020)

- Born: Joseph Lawrence Scanlan; August 16, 1929; Brooklyn, New York, U.S.
- Died: December 18, 2020 (aged 91); Santa Barbara, California, U.S.
- Occupation: Television director
- Years active: 1954–2002

Joseph Lawrence Scanlan (August 16, 1929 – December 18, 2020) was an American television director who early in his career was the primary director (1,665 of 1,710 episodes) of the NBC-TV soap opera Somerset (1970–76). He went on to direct individual episodes of numerous TV shows, TV movies, and one feature film. His last credit was a 2002 episode of Flatland.

== Filmography ==
- Somerset (primary director, 1,665 episodes, 1970–76)
- Another World (multiple episodes, 1971)
- The Secret Storm (multiple episodes, 1972)
- The Starlost (6 episodes, 1973–74)
- Our Man Flint: Dead on Target (TV Movie, 1976)
- Land of the Lost (7 episodes, 1976)
- What's Happening!! (1 episode, 1979)
- The Littlest Hobo (15 episodes, 1980–82)
- The Starlost: Deception (TV movie, 1980)
- Spring Fever (film, 1982)
- Knots Landing (22 episodes, 1985–91)
- Adderly (1 episode, 1986)
- Falcon Crest (6 episodes, 1987–89)
- Nightstick (TV movie, 1987)
- The Return of Ben Casey (TV movie, 1988)
- Star Trek: The Next Generation (4 episodes, 1988–89)
- Paradise (2 episodes, 1988)
- Island Son (unknown episodes, 1989–90)
- War of the Worlds (1 episode, 1990)
- Quantum Leap (1 episode, 1990)
- The Young Riders (6 episodes, 1990–92)
- The World's Oldest Living Bridesmaid (TV movie, 1990)
- I Still Dream of Jeannie (TV movie, 1991)
- Homefront (4 episodes, 1992)
- The Hidden Room (1 episode, 1993)
- North of 60 (as Joseph Scanlan) (2 episodes, 1993)
- Kung Fu: The Legend Continues (3 episodes, 1993–94)
- The Adventures of Brisco County, Jr. (3 episodes, 1994)
- Due South (1 episode, 1994)
- Spenser: The Judas Goat (TV movie, 1994)
- Spenser: A Savage Place (TV movie, 1995)
- Lois & Clark: The New Adventures of Superman (1 episode, 1995)
- Picture Perfect (TV movie, 1995)
- The Outer Limits (7 episodes, 1995–96)
- Dangerous Minds (multiple episodes, 1996)
- Poltergeist: The Legacy (1 episode, 1996)
- Stand Against Fear (TV movie, 1996)
- Dead Man's Gun (TV pilot, 1997)
- Players (2 episodes, 1997–98)
- La Femme Nikita (6 episodes, 1997–2000)
- Earth: Final Conflict (1 episode, 1998)
- Broken Silence: A Moment of Truth Movie (TV movie, 1998)
- Strange World (1 episode, 1999)
- Largo Winch (TV pilot, 2001)
- Flatland (1 episode, 2002)

== Awards and nominations ==
Scanlan was nominated for a Gemini Award for Best Direction in a Dramatic Program or Mini-Series (The Outer Limits) in 1995. He directed "The Big Goodbye" (Star Trek: The Next Generation), which won a Peabody award in 1987.
