= Spacecraft in Star Trek =

Spacecraft that appear in the Star Trek franchise

The Star Trek franchise features many spacecraft. Various space vessels make up the primary settings of the Star Trek television series, films, and expanded universe; others help advance the franchise's stories. Throughout the franchise's production, spacecraft have been depicted by numerous physical and computer-generated models. Producers worked to balance often tight budgets with the need to depict convincing, futuristic vessels.

Beyond their media appearances, Star Trek spacecraft have been marketed as models, books, and rides. Filming models have sold for thousands of dollars at public auction.

== Development and production ==
=== Establishing basic designs (1966–1969) ===
Matt Jefferies' design of the USS Enterprise—featuring a saucer section, engineering hull, and external engine nacelles—established a design schema that influenced the Star Trek franchise's future television and film spin-offs.

The original Star Trek television series (1966–1969) established key tenets of the Star Trek franchise: an intrepid, diverse crew traveling through space and encountering the unknown. Matt Jefferies designed the crew's spaceship, the USS Enterprise. Jefferies' experience with aviation led to his Enterprise designs being imbued with what he called "aircraft logic". Series creator Gene Roddenberry wanted the ship's design to convey speed, power, a "shirt sleeve" working environment, and readiness for a multiyear mission. Roddenberry insisted the ship not have fins or rockets; Jefferies also avoided repeating fictional designs from Buck Rogers and Flash Gordon, along with the real-world space exploration work done by Boeing, Douglas Aircraft Company, Lockheed Corporation, NACA, NASA, and Northrop. With Roddenberry's speed requirement, Jefferies decided the ship needed to be instantly recognizable from a distance, and that speed could be conveyed by the ship starting small in the background and growing as it accelerates toward the camera. Jefferies imagined the ship's engines were so powerful they would be dangerous to be near, hence the pair of external warp nacelles. Jefferies initially designed the habitable portion of the ship as a sphere, but it conflicted with the need to suggest the ship's speed. Although Jefferies wanted to avoid the cliche of a "flying saucer", the saucer-shaped upper portion of the hull eventually became part of the final design. Jefferies kept the exterior as plain as possible, both to allow light to play across the model and to suggest that the ship's vital equipment was on the interior, where it could be more readily maintained and repaired. Looking at an early balsa and birchwood model of the Enterprise, Roddenberry thought the vessel would look better upside down, and a TV Guide cover once depicted it as such; ultimately, however, the show used Jefferies' arrangement. The saucer module, engineering hull, and twin warp nacelle design influenced producers' designs of Starfleet vessels throughout the franchise's spin-offs and films.

The original series' Klingon cruiser design was retained for the first Star Trek film, and the motif of a manta ray-type hull with a bulbous prow influenced the design of Klingon vessels in subsequent films and spin-offs.

The filming model's constituent parts cost under $600. The Enterprise is depicted with a registry number of "NCC-1701". Jefferies combined the "NC" of American civilian aircraft registration codes with the "CC CC" of Russian aircraft, deriving "NCC". The "1701" digits were chosen for their readability on television screens. Although initially lacking internal lighting, the tight budget ultimately allowed the model's starboard side to receive illuminated windows. The show's limited budget also affected the Enterprise's support craft: Jefferies wanted to give the show's shuttlecraft a more aerodynamic look than the Enterprise itself, but it was too expensive to build a life-size filming model with a curved hull. Ultimately, toy model company AMT paid for the construction of the shuttle design in exchange for the rights to sell a model toy. The shuttlecraft became a key plot element in the episode "The Galileo Seven" (1967). The show's tight budget meant, more often than not, producers recycled models and footage, used cheaper animation techniques, or simply omitted the appearance of spacecraft. As with the Enterprise's design, alien spacecraft design in Star Trek—such as the Klingon starships' resemblance to a manta ray with a bulbous prow, and Romulan vessels' bird-of-prey markings and nomenclature—influenced future television and film productions.

=== Initial films (1979–1984) ===
Industrial Light & Magic's William George based his USS Excelsior design on what he thought the Enterprise would look like if it were designed by the Japanese. The model retains the distinct hull features of Matt Jefferies' Enterprise. Redresses of the Excelsior model, and later digital versions, were heavily used throughout the franchise.

Several years after Star Trek was canceled, Roddenberry and other producers began work for a new series, Star Trek: Phase II. Paramount Pictures, recognizing the market for science-fiction films after the success of Star Wars (1977), instead approved the production of Star Trek: The Motion Picture (1979). Many of the film's designs and models came from Phase II, although they were recreated to provide the higher level of detail needed for a big-screen appearance. Mike Minor, Joe Jennings, Harold Michaelson, Andrew Probert, Douglas Trumbull, and Richard Tyler redesigned the USS Enterprise while retaining the television series ship's overall shape. The Motion Picture introduced the rubberband-like "snap" effect for starships going to warp speed. Like the Enterprise, the Klingon vessel retained a design reminiscent of its television appearances.

Star Trek II: The Wrath of Khan (1982) and Star Trek III: The Search for Spock (1984) introduce models—Klingon bird-of-prey, Federation starbase, merchant ship, USS Excelsior, USS Grissom, and USS Reliant—that would be reused in at least one Star Trek television spin-off. These models were created by Industrial Light & Magic (ILM), which would continue to generate models and assist with special effects for subsequent films and spin-offs. Producers still used some cost-saving measures when depicting some spacecraft, such as reusing footage from previous films. William Shatner's and Leonard Nimoy's demands for "sky-high salaries" for Star Trek IV: The Voyage Home (1986) caused the studio to plan for a new television series. The seven-year production of Star Trek: The Next Generation overlapped with those of Star Trek V: The Final Frontier (1989) and Star Trek VI: The Undiscovered Country (1991)—and while those two films made heavy use of Next Generation sets, few spacecraft model assets were shared between the television and film projects.

=== Return to television (1987–1994) ===
Among the first to join the design team of Star Trek: The Next Generation (1986–1994) were Probert, Rick Sternbach, and Michael Okuda. The three had not only worked on the Star Trek films, but also had experiences working in science and aerospace.

Spacecraft models created for Star Trek: The Next Generation
Ship	Appearance	Designed by	Production notes
Borg cube	"Q Who" (1989)	Richard James and Rick Sternbach	Nominated for an Emmy Award
Borg variant	"Descent" (1993)	Dan Curry	
Cardassian Galor class	"The Wounded" (1991)	Sternbach	Reminiscent of an ankh, a symbol chosen because the Cardassians are like pharaohs to the enslaved Bajorans.
USS Enterprise-C	"Yesterday's Enterprise" (1990)	Andrew Probert and Sternbach	First appearance of an Ambassador-class ship
USS Enterprise-D	"Encounter at Farpoint" (1987)	Probert	First appearance of a Galaxy-class ship
Ferengi marauder	"The Last Outpost" (1987)	Jein and Probert	Inspired by the shape of a horseshoe crab
Gomtuu	"Tin Man" (1990)	Jein and Sternbach	Inspired by the thermal pods in Buckaroo Bonzai
Husnock ship	"The Survivors" (1989)	Tony Meininger	Reused as a Promellian derelict
Klingon Vor'cha class	"Reunion" (1990)	Jein and Sternbach	Follows original Star Trek design while reflecting Klingon-Federation alliance
USS Kyushu	"The Best of Both Worlds" (1990)	Ed Miarecki	Created by combining an Enterprise-D model with custom parts. First appearance of a New Orleans-class ship.
USS Pasteur	"All Good Things..." (1994)	Bill George	Based on a camera-ready "Olympic-class" model George created. Ultimately labeled as a Hope-class starship.
USS Phoenix	"The Wounded"	Jein	Based on a desktop model created by Ed Miarecki. First appearance of a Nebula-class ship.
Romulan warbird	"The Neutral Zone" (1988)	Jein and Probert	
USS Stargazer	"The Battle" (1987)	Probert and Sternbach	Based on a kitbash and created as an alternative to reusing movie-era Enterprise model. First appearance of a Constellation-class ship.
Vulcan starship	"Unification" (1991)	Jein and Sternbach	

Roddenberry envisioned the new series occurring in an era when people were preoccupied with improving the quality of life, and he emphasized this point in calling for a larger, brighter, and less-sterile USS Enterprise than the ship in the original Star Trek. Probert's design of the new Enterprise was based on a "what if?" painting he created after designing the refit Enterprise for The Motion Picture. It suggested a merging of technology and design into a sleeker ship, yet retained the overall shape of a saucer section, engineering hull, and warp engine nacelles from the original television show. The final Enterprise-D design was revealed to the public in a July 1987 column in Starlog. After rejecting the idea of using CGI for special effects and shooting miniatures, the producers hired ILM—which worked extensively on the Star Trek films—to build a pair of Enterprise models. Six modelmakers, led by Star Trek film veteran Greg Jein, built the models for $75,000. Another model was created midway through the third season. ILM also created the distinct "rubberband" effect of the Enterprise going to warp speed—an effect initially created for The Motion Picture.

The new series' creators were concerned that budget constraints for The Next Generation could be even more of a problem for them as they had been for the original Star Trek. To help avoid them, the producers reused and recycled sets, models, props, and footage created for the movie franchise; the development of Star Trek: Deep Space Nine also saw resources being shared across the two television series. ILM created a catalog of effects shots, which they thought would help the show save money. In practice, however, the catalog was insufficient to meet the show's needs, and using catalog footage as an element in a shot placed constraints on the movement of shooting models added to the shot. By the end of the first season, the producers moved away from that catalog. Robert Legato, who supervised the show's in-house visual effects, was eventually able to enhance the appearance of shooting models by using a moving camera for its effects shots, allowing objects in a shot to move in relation to each other. When The Next Generation depicts combat between spacecraft, it is usually single ship-on-ship; however, there are exceptions, such as a "Star Wars-like" battle in "Preemptive Strike" (1994) between numerous Maquis fighters and a Cardassian ship. According to Sternbach, there usually wasn't enough time to create and make a new ship each week; nevertheless, producers created numerous new spacecraft for The Next Generation. Dan Curry said that to conserve the budget for use on ships to be seen in close-up, small "worker bee" vessels not requiring significant detail were made out of cheap, everyday objects. Additionally, the Next Generation team used models from the first three Star Trek films; the Excelsior, Grissom, and Reliant models were redressed to become various Excelsior-, Oberth-, and Miranda-class starships, respectively.

The visual effects shot of the "USS Pegasus" spacecraft was a re-dress of the Oberth class model. The VFX model auctioned off in 2006 by Christie's. The Oberth-class was designed by David Carson, and built at Industrial Light & Magic. The model was made for the 1984 theatrical film Star Trek III: The Search for Spock, where it depicted a ship called the "USS Grissom".

As with the original Star Trek, budget concerns delayed the construction of a full-scale shuttlecraft set until a script made the shuttle an important part of the story. The first Next Generation story to use a shuttle is "Coming of Age" (1988); for this story, Probert designed a shooting model and set-designers built one-quarter of the interior space—additional sections were built as the budget allowed. Because the angular interior did not match Probert's curved vessel, a more angular shuttlepod vessel was introduced in "Time Squared (Star Trek: The Next Generation)" (1989). A full-scale shuttle that matched the angular interiors was introduced in "Darmok" (1991). Writers had hoped to depict the designed-but-not-built captain's yacht for "Samaritan Snare" (1989), but the budget instead led to the use of a shuttlecraft (That specific craft type's appearance would eventually appear in Star Trek: Insurrection). Several shuttlecraft names are in homage to figures from science, such as Marie Curie, Farouk El-Baz, Ferdinand Magellan, and Ellison Onizuka.

=== A second spin-off, and introducing digital models (1993–1999) ===
Star Trek: Deep Space Nine (1993–1999) began production as The Next Generation was ending. The eponymous Deep Space Nine space station took Sternbach and Herman Zimmerman several months to design. The show's producers insisted that it look "weird" and distinctly non-Starfleet. Every episode of Deep Space Nine includes shots of the 6-foot (1.8 m) shooting model. Sternbach and Jim Martin designed the show's runabout vessel, conceived as a way to allow the station's crew to continue with Star Trek's main themes of exploration in a show set on an immobile space station. Seven weeks went into the creation of the ship's cockpit—however, when an episode of The Next Generation needed to depict the runabout's living quarters, designer Richard James and set decorator Jim Mees had only nine days to both design and build the set. Martin also designed the USS Defiant under the direction of Gary Hutzel and Zimmerman. The Defiant was introduced in the third season to give the show's character greater range and capabilities when leaving the station. Starting with the show's third season, spacecraft exteriors began to be computer-generated. The studio VisionArt created computer models for several Deep Space Nine ships, including the Defiant, the runabouts, and Jem'Hadar vessels. VisionArt also created a CGI model of the Deep Space Nine, which was used for the final shot of the series finale. Digital Muse and Foundation Imaging also contributed toward Deep Space Nine's special effects and computer modeling. Although the production designers gave the new spin-off a distinct look, Deep Space Nine used numerous ship models created for The Next Generation and, later, Star Trek: First Contact (1996).

=== Balancing digital and physical models in films (1994–2002) ===
Star Trek Generations (1994) mainly features one of the original Enterprise-D models Industrial Light & Magic created for Star Trek: The Next Generation (1987–1994). The model was rewired and resurfaced for film presentation. Although a more-detailed Enterprise model was created midway through The Next Generation's run, one of the originals was used for the film because it was the only one capable of depicting the saucer section's (foreground) separation from the engineering hull. Note the ship's twin engine nacelles—another feature retained from Matt Jefferies' original Enterprise design.

Even as The Next Generation was ending, the actors and many of the production crew were preparing for their first film, Star Trek Generations (1994). This film saw the widening adoption of—but not sole reliance on—computer-generated vehicle models in the film franchise. The USS Enterprise-B in Generations is a reuse of the Excelsior model in Star Trek III, and its surrounding spacedock a reconstruction—with some flattening alterations—of the frame created for The Motion Picture. The Enterprise-D was filmed with one of the original 6-foot (1.8 m) models created by ILM, although it was stripped down, rewired, and resurfaced to depict the level of detail needed for film. The antagonists' Klingon bird-of-prey previously appeared in Star Trek, as did the rescue shuttles and orbiting rescue ships at the film's end. Producers created new models of a solar observatory, along with a 12-foot (3.7 m) model of the Enterprise's saucer section. Scenes involving the Enterprise-B and the Lakul in the Nexus energy ribbon were all computer-generated—in fact, no shooting model was ever made of the ill-fated El-Aurian refugee ship. Shots of the Enterprise-D going to warp were also computer-generated.

The Romulan Scimitar (left) and USS Enterprise-E in Star Trek Nemesis (2002). Designer John Eaves took inspiration for the Scimitar from the bird-of-prey created for Star Trek III (1984)—a ship originally designed with Romulans in mind. The Enterprise, created for Star Trek: First Contact (1996), was designed by Eaves and Herman Zimmerman to appear sleeker and faster than its Next Generation predecessor. Although both ships were mainly depicted by computer models in Nemesis, the climactic collision of the two was realized with physical models.

The trend toward using digital models increased with subsequent films. Star Trek: First Contact (1996) introduces the Sovereign-class Enterprise-E, conceived by production designer Herman Zimmerman and illustrator John Eaves as a larger, sleeker, faster-looking ship. Based on blueprints created by Sternbach, ILM's John Goodson created a 10.5-foot (3.2 m) shooting model. Goodson also created a model of the Phoenix ship, and a physical Borg cube model was needed for close-up shots. First Contact was the last Star Trek film to make heavy use of physical models, and many ships in the film are depicted by computer models. In addition to the physical model, the Enterprise was also built as a computer model. John Knoll worked with visual effects art director Alex Jaeger to design and create a variety of new ships to populate the opening battle against the Borg. Knoll and Jaeger decided the new ships had to be consistent with Star Trek precedent, such as a saucer section and pair of warp nacelles, but also could not look so similar as to be confused with the new Enterprise. With these requirements in mind, Jaeger reduced 16 initial designs down to four, and created computer-generated models of the Akira-, Norway-, Saber-, and Steamrunner-class ships.

ILM was not available to support the next two films, Star Trek: Insurrection (1998) and Star Trek Nemesis (2002). Santa Barbara Studies created CG models of the Enterprise and other new ships for Insurrection, while Digital Domain worked on Nemesis. John Eaves designed new ships for Nemesis, with Doug Drexler doing computer-generated models. The antagonist's Scimitar ship was initially conceived to be a massive upgrade to the Romulan warbird designed for The Next Generation. In designing the ship, Eaves revisited the Klingon bird-of-prey concept created for Star Trek III, retaining the "hawklike head". For the smaller Scorpion fighter, Eaves instead took inspiration from an F-18 fighter. Although the film largely used computer-generated models, Digital Domain used physical models to depict the collision between the battle-damaged Enterprise and Scimitar; Digital Domain's Mark Forker said building battle-damaged models was at least twice as hard as creating models of pristine starships.

=== Continuation on television (1995–2005) ===
By the time production began on Star Trek: Voyager (1995–2001), advances in computing allowed designers to create rough digital three-dimensional models of starships. Until that point, designers could submit only sketches to executive producer Rick Berman and other staffers, but "sketches can be deceiving"; the use of 3D modeling removed a degree of guesswork from the process. Sternbach said the most important change in the process of creating spacecraft for the franchise was the increasing availability of CGI software and access to better-performing computers. Digital Muse, Foundation Imaging, and Eden FX contributed toward Voyager's computer modeling; the latter two also worked on Enterprise.

Sternbach and Richard James, who designed the Borg cube for The Next Generation, collaborated over several months to design the Intrepid-class USS Voyager. As with Star Trek and The Next Generation, the show's budget did not immediately allow for the creation of a new shuttlecraft; initially, the show used one of The Next Generation's shuttle miniatures and interiors, with minor alterations to make it look Voyager-specific. Many Voyager plot lines called for a shuttlecraft to be destroyed; the large number of shuttlecraft reserves the stranded starship seemed to have amused some people and bothered others. Eventually, Sternbach and James collaborated to create the Delta Flyer, a more resilient shuttlecraft.

Doug Drexler took four months to design the eponymous Enterprise for the fifth spinoff, Star Trek: Enterprise (2001–2005). A predecessor to Jefferies' original Enterprise, some elements of this ship were inspired by the Akira class in First Contact, and its overall compactness was inspired by Deep Space Nine's Defiant. Eden FX created computer-generated models for all four seasons of Enterprise.

=== Franchise reboot (2009) ===
Producers of the 2009 Star Trek film balanced between paying homage to established Star Trek lore while also reinvigorating the franchise. The redesigned Enterprise has a "hot-rod" look while retaining a ship's traditional shape. ILM was given "tremendous" leeway in creating the ship. Concept artist Ryan Church's initial designs were refined and developed into photo-realistic models by Alex Jaeger's team at ILM. ILM's Roger Guyett recalled the original Enterprise being "very static", and added moving components to the film's model. ILM retained subtle geometric forms and patterns to allude back to the original Enterprise. The computer model's digital paint recreates the use of "interference paint", which contains small particles of mica to alter the apparent color, used on the first three films' model.

=== Film and television re-releases ===
The 2001 Director's Edition of The Motion Picture includes 90 new and redesigned computer-generated shots produced by Foundation Imaging, many of which include a computer-generated model of the Enterprise. The new shots depict more dynamic lighting and clearer senses of scale than the original release.

In September 2006, CBS began airing remastered episodes of Star Trek. The remastered series, directed by Mike Okuda, includes updated special effects shots. For example, the alternate universe Enterprise in "Mirror, Mirror" was originally depicted by the "regular" Enterprise filming model; however, in the remastered version, the alternate Enterprise has different markings and hull features. In contrast, Okuda said CBS' release of The Next Generation on Blu-rays would see "sharper [and] clearer" effects shots, but no significant changes. Part of the disparity between the treatment of effects shots for the remastered Star Trek and the Blu-ray release of The Next Generation is due to film archiving. The studio did not store film from each individual effect element in Star Trek; it stored only the final, composite effect. However, the composite prints did not scan well in high definition, leading to the creation of new effects elements. In contrast, Paramount Studios maintained a thorough archive of Next Generation film elements, allowing most of those to transition to Blu-ray with minimal, if any, alterations. Nearly all of the spacecraft elements in the Next Generation Blu-ray will be from the original film, and there will be few corrections to production or effects errors.

=== Books and games ===
Several Star Trek board, roleplaying, and video games take place on and allow players to control various spacecraft. Star Trek Online (2010) developers invited fans to design the Enterprise-F, successor to the USS Enterprise-E from the Next Generation-era films. Adam Ihle submitted the winning design, an Odyssey-class starship that will appear in the game. Star Trek Online executive producer Daniel Stahl said Ihle's design inspired the creative team, presenting a familiar silhouette yet evolving the franchise's ship design. Similarly, Simon & Schuster held a contest to design the USS Titan, a science vessel commanded by William Riker about whom a series of novels has been published. Sean Tourangeau's design won the contest, which was scored on originality, execution, consistency with the publisher's concept notes, and consistency with Star Trek's established Starfleet style. Several other Star Trek novel lines have been created that take place on ships and stations other than those depicted in the franchise's film and television fiction.

== Impact and critical reaction ==
Christie's Star Trek: The Collection auction results (partial)
Spacecraft model	Estimated winning bid	Actual winning bid
Enterprise-D	$25,000–30,000	$500,000
Klingon bird-of-prey	$8,000–12,000	$260,000
Enterprise-A	$15,000–25,000	$240,000
USS Voyager	$10,000–15,000	$110,000
Deep Space Nine	$8,000–12,000	$110,000
USS Lakota (redressed USS Excelsior)	$3,000–5,000	$110,000
USS Enterprise-E	$8,000–12,000	$100,000
USS Defiant	$6,000–8,000	$85,000
Klingon battlecruiser	$3,000–5,000	$85,000

The basic design of the original Enterprise "formed the basis for one of sci-fi's most iconic images". In 1992, the National Air and Space Museum curator said "there is no other fantasy more pervasive in the conceptualization of space flight than Star Trek". The Next Generation was nominated for an Emmy for its depiction of the Borg cube in "Q Who". Star Trek: The Experience included a shuttlecraft ride simulator. Spacecraft filming models made up nine of the ten highest-bid items in Christie's Star Trek: The Collection auction.

== Merchandising ==
AMT's model of the original Enterprise's shuttlecraft sold over one million units. In 1989, Ertl released a model kit that included The Next Generation's Ferengi marauder, Klingon bird-of-prey, and Romulan warbird. AMT released a Vor'cha-class model in 1991. Galoob created Micro Machines of various Star Trek starships from 1993 to 1997, and Hallmark created Christmas ornaments of the original series shuttlecraft, Romulan warbird, and Klingon bird-of-prey.

In 2011, Simon & Schuster published the Starship Spotter, a collection of images of various spacecraft in Star Trek. Since 2002, Star Trek illustrator and designer Doug Drexler has led development of an annual Ship of the Line calendar featuring images and information about various spacecraft from the Star Trek franchise.

== See also ==
- Starship Enterprise
