= Shuttlecraft (Star Trek) =

Fictional short range spacecraft class

Shuttlecraft are fictional vehicles in the Star Trek science fiction franchise built for short trips in space, such as between a planetary surface and orbit. Also referred to as shuttles, their introduction preceded the development of the Space Shuttle.

Before Star Trek, science fiction productions from Forbidden Planet to Rocky Jones, Space Ranger assumed that a long-range starship would land on planets. Gene Roddenberry's original premise stated that the starship Enterprise rarely lands. Given the special effects complexity of landing a giant starship each week, "rarely" was quickly changed to "never". Dated March 1964, the premise mentions a "small shuttle rocket". The shuttle rocket was too expensive to build for the first episodes. For most of the series the transporter served to teleport characters on and off the ship.

In the first year of Star Trek: The Original Series, the need quickly developed for shuttlecraft. Used to carry personnel, cargo and reconnaissance payloads, shuttles filled the same need as boats on a navy ship. They were also used by starbases. For television writers, they served the dramatic function of putting characters in a small ship that could get lost. Though shuttlecraft were initially expensive to build, they were eventually used in every Star Trek series. Shuttlecraft designs were often shared across different media, for example the Danube-class runabout featured heavily in Star Trek: Deep Space Nine, was also featured in Star Trek: The Next Generation.

== Star Trek: The Original Series ==
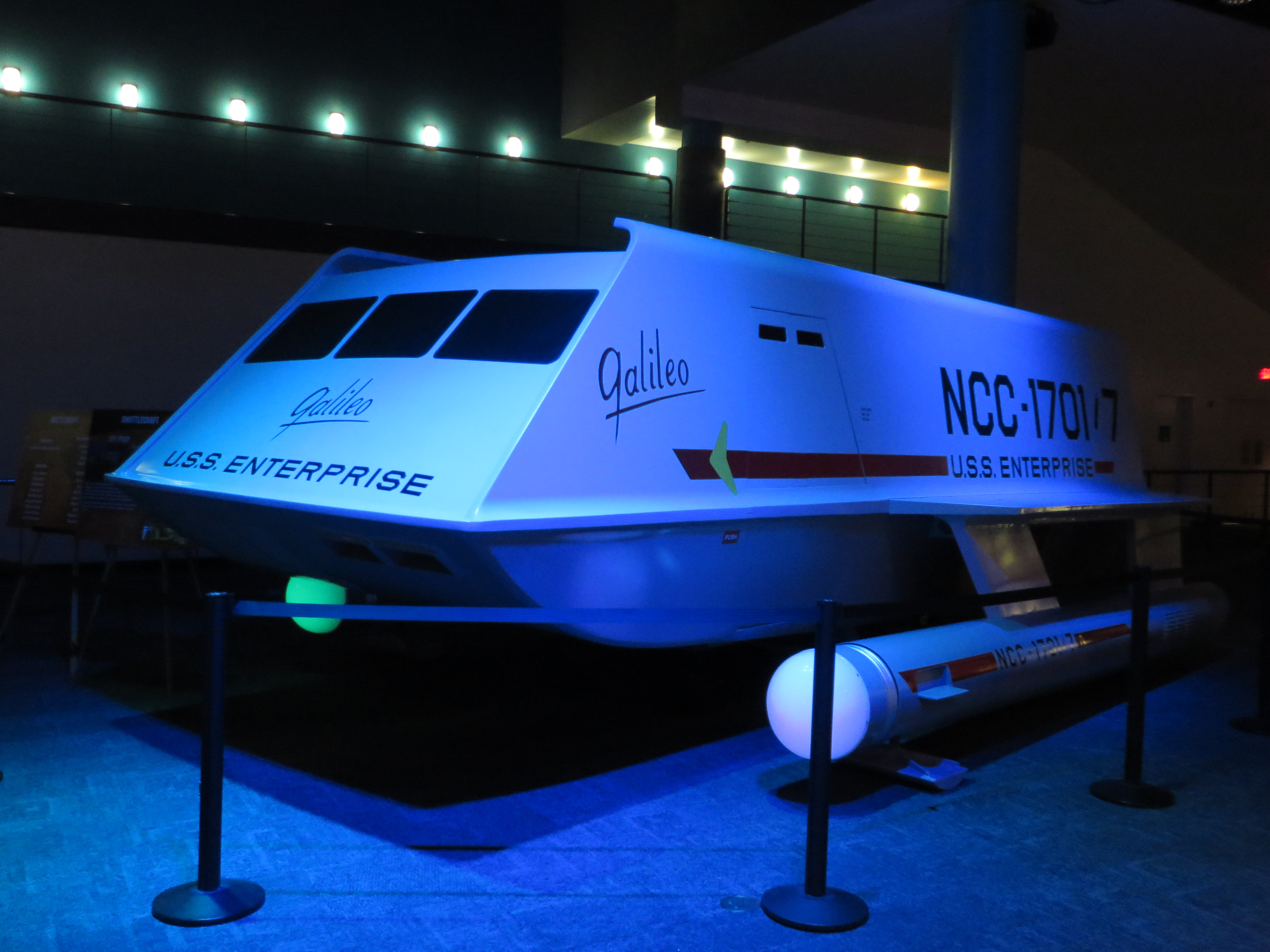
A Shuttlecraft prop from the original series, on display at Space Center Houston

Art director Matt Jefferies originally envisioned a sleek, streamlined shuttle based upon his background as a pilot. The curved shape proved too expensive to build for the first episodes. AMT offered to build a full-sized shuttlecraft at no cost in exchange for rights to market a model kit. The final design of the mockup, by Gene Winfield, is 24 feet (7.2 m) long and weighs one ton, has a plywood hull, and was built in two months by a team of 12 people. A separate set was used for interior scenes as the mockup was too small for filming. This boxlike, utilitarian shape became the prototype of shuttles throughout Star Trek. The shuttlecraft, named for Galileo Galilei, was first featured in "The Galileo Seven". Its registration number is NCC-1701/7 and carries a crew of seven. When Galileo and her crew go missing in the episode a second shuttlecraft called Columbus is launched.

Once the shuttlecraft had been established, footage of them appeared in episodes including "The Menagerie", "The Doomsday Machine", "Journey to Babel", "Metamorphosis", "The Immunity Syndrome", and "The Way to Eden". In the latter episode, the full-size mockup sported the name Galileo II, acknowledging that the original shuttlecraft was lost during "The Galileo Seven". During "The Omega Glory", the USS Exeter, a starship of the same class as the Enterprise, is said to carry four shuttlecraft.

The Galileo shuttlecraft (a full-size theatrical prop) was not dismantled, but passed through the possession of several owners. The 1966 mockup was sold at auction for $70,150 in summer 2012. The new owner, Adam Schneider, a collector of Trek screen-used items, spent nine months restoring the Galileo in Atlantic Highlands, New Jersey. It was then donated to NASA's Lyndon B. Johnson Space Center Museum in Houston. The shuttlecraft Galileo was formally unveiled at Space Center Houston on July 31, 2013. In 2014, the prop was used again in a film production and appeared in a scene of the fan-made Star Trek Continues episode "Fairest of Them All".

== Star Trek: The Animated Series ==
Freed from the constraints of what could be physically built, Star Trek: The Animated Series introduced audiences to a variety of spacecraft. A larger shuttlecraft, sporting a long nose similar to Star Wars X-wing fighter (years before their first appearance), appeared in "The Slaver Weapon". The episode "Mudd's Passion" featured a different shuttlecraft design. "The Ambergris Element" featured an "aquashuttle", capable of landing on a water-covered planet and submerging. The ambitious scope of this Filmation animated series was a foretaste of what would someday be possible with computer graphics.

== Star Trek films ==
With its large budget, Star Trek: The Motion Picture showed a variety of shuttle-type vehicles operating near Earth. Though the transporter is nearly always available, shuttles provided a dramatic way for characters to enter. A passenger shuttle carrying Admiral James T. Kirk is shown landing in San Francisco. Kirk travels from an Earth-orbiting Space station to Enterprise in a barrel-shaped "travel pod". Spock docks with Enterprise in a shuttle named for the Vulcan philosopher Surak, which carries Warp drive nacelles on a detachable sled. Matte paintings of the cargo deck show that the refurbished Enterprise carries shuttles similar to the Surak but without the warp drive sled, indicating that this is a standard shuttle design.

Star Trek: The Motion Picture depicts the "Travel Pod" shuttlecraft.

Star Trek II: The Wrath of Khan, the next film in the series was made with a much lower budget. Footage of Kirk's arrival in a travel pod was recycled from Star Trek: The Motion Picture. In Star Trek III: The Search for Spock, shuttles were seen as background elements in the spacedock. At the end of Star Trek IV: The Voyage Home, passenger shuttles appear both in spacedock and to rescue the crew from San Francisco Bay. At the movie's end, a travel pod is seen again carrying Kirk and crew to the Enterprise.

Star Trek V: The Final Frontier featured many scenes with updated shuttlecrafts, also sporting the name Galileo as well as Copernicus. The design was similar in size and shape to the original series shuttle, with updated engine nacelles and a large rear hatch. The miniature shuttle and landing bay were built by Greg Jein. The shuttle was also built as a full-sized prop berthed in a full-scale hangar deck set.

Star Trek VI: The Undiscovered Country contained a scene of a "spacedock ferry". The miniature was later modified to appear as the Jenolen in the Star Trek: The Next Generation episode "Relics".

Among movies featuring the Next Generation cast, Star Trek Generations shows several shuttlecraft used to evacuate a crashed Enterprise. Star Trek: Insurrection featured both a new design shuttlecraft and a captain's yacht. Star Trek Nemesis introduced Argo, a shuttle designed to carry a land vehicle in a rear compartment.

== Star Trek: The Next Generation ==
USS Enterprise (NCC-1701-D) of Star Trek: The Next Generation was designed with a highly curved and sculpted shape. Designer Andrew Probert, like Matt Jefferies before him, designed a shuttle with a streamlined shape. Miniature footage of this design was seen in episodes such as "Coming of Age", "The Child" and "Unnatural Selection". Referred to as a Type 7 shuttle, it had a projected length of 8.5 m. As before, the series lacked the resources to build the complex shape of this shuttle as a full-scale prop.

The script for "Time Squared" called for a full-scale shuttle that the crew could walk around and examine. That episode introduced the Type 15 shuttlepod, a tiny craft only 3.6 meters long. Modified versions of the shuttlepod appeared in subsequent episodes like "The Most Toys".

One of the shuttles was named Einstein.

During the 1991–92 season the full-scale shuttlecraft mockup built for Star Trek V: The Final Frontier became available. It was modified with larger windows and nacelles to reflect the Next Generation's technology. This Type 6 shuttle first appeared in "Darmok" and was seen in subsequent episodes like "Relics". The Type 6 shuttle was 6.0 meters long. Follow-on series Star Trek: Deep Space Nine and Star Trek: Voyager took place in the same 24th century time frame, sharing many costumes and props.

The Type-15 Shuttlepod was seen in "Time Squared". A set for the runabout shuttle's aft living quarters was built for "Timescape", an episode in the sixth season of The Next Generation (running concurrently with DS9's first season). The set was designed by Richard James, and was funded from The Next Generation's budget, in order to take pressure off DS9's finances. Unlike the cockpit construction, design and fabrication of the aft set had to be completed in nine days. This was the only appearance of the Danube class outside of DS9, and although the set was intended for use on DS9, it was never used again to depict a runabout's interior.

A Ferengi shuttlecraft is featured in the Star Trek franchise since its introduction in "The Price". It was also seen in Star Trek: Deep Space Nine's "Little Green Men" as a spacecraft of the Ferengi character Quark as well as several more times over the course of that series belonging to other Ferengi guest characters. The studio model for VFX was auctioned by Christie's for over 8000 USD in 2006.

== Star Trek: Deep Space Nine ==
Since the space station of Star Trek: Deep Space Nine rarely moved, some sort of auxiliary craft was necessary. The first episode introduced the runabouts. Equipped with warp drive and transporter for long missions, the runabout was described as a small starship. With its boxlike shape, chisel nose and ski-like nacelles the runabout looked like a descendant of previous shuttles. The design was initially inspired by the spacedock ferry in Star Trek VI: The Undiscovered Country. A runabout also appeared in the Next Generation episode "Timescape" and the Voyager episode "Non Sequiter".

In "The Search", the first episode of the third season, the starship USS Defiant was introduced. Defiant took over some of the defense and exploration roles previously filled by runabouts. The new starship needed her own shuttles, and a small Type 18 shuttlepod was seen in the episode. Another Type 10 shuttle design was seen aboard Defiant in the Season 6 episode "The Sound of Her Voice" (June 10, 1998 / S6E25).

The episode "Change of Heart" includes a sequence that depicts a runabout traversing an asteroid field, then landing on a planet. This was the first episode in which runabout sequences were done completely with computer-generated imagery: complex scenes where the ship weaved through the dense asteroid field were achieved without weeks of miniature effect work, and camera movements during the landing sequence allowed the runabout to be shown from multiple angles in the same scene, as there was no need to conceal a 'mounting point' for the miniature. The CGI model for the Danube class (The Runabout) was developed by Digital Muse.

== Star Trek: Voyager ==
Though the titular starship USS Voyager was capable of landing on planets, shuttlecraft were frequently needed. Possibly due to budgetary reasons, Star Trek: Voyager began her journey using the Type 6 shuttle first seen in Star Trek: The Next Generation. A new Class 2 shuttle was first seen in "Threshold".

During Voyager's journey to Earth, a large number of shuttles were seen being lost, but there never seemed to be any indication that Voyager was running low. However the argument was made onscreen that the existing shuttles were unsuited to Voyager's needs, resulting in the crew designing and building a new shuttle themselves. The Delta Flyer was introduced in the episode "Extreme Risk". Equipped with warp drive and technological enhancements gleaned from the Borg, the Delta Flyer was far more capable than the standard shuttles it replaced, though the previous shuttle classes were still seen sporadically up through the penultimate episode of the show "Renaissance Man".

The Delta Flyer would be an important shuttlecraft in many episodes through the rest of the show's run. The design of the fictional spacecraft by the production staff and how it was presented in special effects has been written about in books about the franchise. The Delta Flyer was designed by illustrator Rich Sternbach, and exterior views were rendered by computer graphics by Foundation Imaging. The design was developed by 1998 by writers, illustrator, and CGI artists for the show.

One of Voyager's shuttles, the Aeroshuttle, was integrated with the hull in the saucer section and although it was never used in an episode, the production team did develop special effects test footage of it disembarking. Voyager's Aeroshuttle was intended as a warp-capable vessel that could also fly in atmospheres; the footage was made by CGI team leaders Rob Bonchune and Adam Lebowitz, along with the VFX Producer Dan Curry. Two other craft, the Manta and Cochrane were also developed but the Manta was not used. As referred in the website below, The Cochrane was used in "Threshold" for the purpose of breaching the transwarp barrier, which is by analogy to hitting Mach One.

== Star Trek: Enterprise ==
During the earlier time period of Star Trek: Enterprise, the transporter technology that previous series had most often used getting to and from their ship is still a relatively new innovation. This led to the utilizing their shuttles far more frequently. The first episode introduced a winged shuttlepod, two of which were carried aboard ship. Though the shuttlepods were represented in space via computer graphics, a full-scale mockup was built for scenes with actors. This shuttlepod design was used extensively throughout all four seasons.

Enterprise also featured inspection pods in a small number of episodes. These pods lacked the ability to land but had better visibility than any other craft. This made them well suited to examining the exterior of starships.

One episode of the series "Shuttlepod One" takes place mostly aboard a shuttlecraft. Actor Dominic Keating, who played Lieutenant Malcolm Reed, said he thought it was one of the "finest hours" of the show in a 2015 interview with SyFy, and it was also highly rated by The Guardian and The Hollywood Reporter. The shuttlecraft plays into a plot element, as its air supply is running out, which creates an atmosphere of tension and desperation as the characters try to find a solution.

== Real space shuttles ==
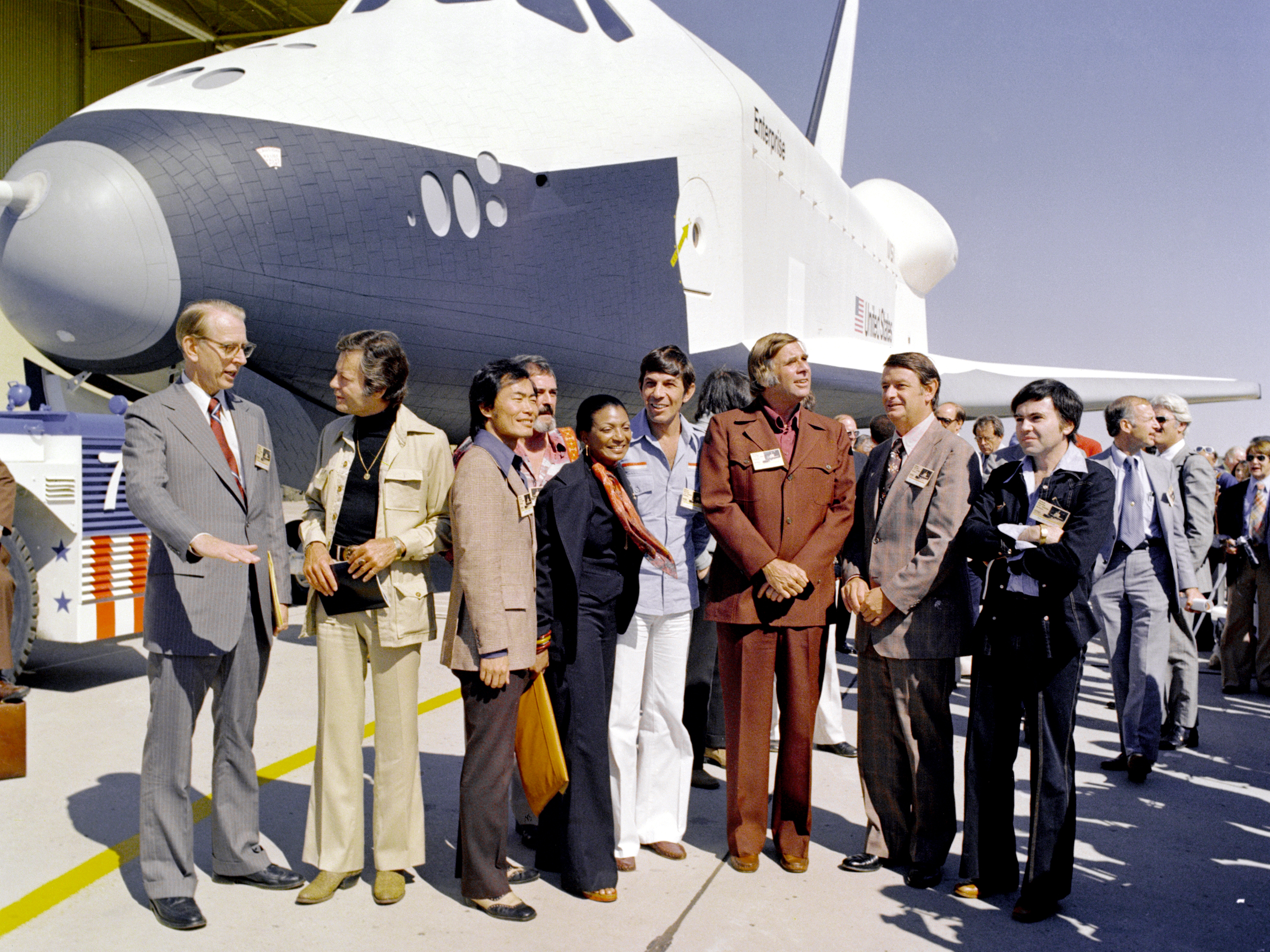
Star Trek personnel and NASA administrators attending the Space Shuttle Enterprise's rollout ceremony

In part because of Star Trek, the term space shuttle has permanently entered Earth's vocabulary as a vehicle for traveling between a planetary surface and space. Wernher von Braun in the 1950s conceived of a reusable winged spacecraft as a ferry rocket. Plans for such vehicles were referred to as "DC-3" by spacecraft designer Maxime Faget and Integrated Launch and Reentry Vehicle (ILRV) by NASA. During the late 1960s, while Star Trek: The Original Series was being broadcast, these concepts became known as Space Shuttle. In a speech given to the British Interplanetary Society in August 1968 George Mueller, head of the NASA Office of Manned Space Flight, mentioned the need for a Space Shuttle. This was the earliest known official use of the term.

Aerospace Engineer Maxwell Hunter and others had been using the term "shuttlecraft" for several years, corresponding to the broadcast dates of Star Trek. By 1969, the term "Space Shuttle" had replaced ILRV. In April 1969, a Space Shuttle Task Group was formed within NASA. Star Trek's penultimate episode, the last in a regular time slot, had aired on March 14, 1969. On January 5, 1972, President Richard Nixon formally announced development of the Space Shuttle, making the name permanent.

In February 1977, the OV-101 test vehicle began glide tests. OV-101 was christened space shuttle Enterprise after a concerted letter-writing campaign by Star Trek fans. Like the shuttlecraft of Star Trek: The Original Series, the Space Shuttle orbiters were used interchangeably to carry crew, cargo or exploration payloads. In orbital missions from 1981 to 2011, the Space Shuttle became symbolic of humanity's reach into Space.
