= Klingon starships =

Fictional spacecraft

In the Star Trek franchise, the Klingon Empire makes use of several classes of starships. As the Klingons are portrayed as a warrior culture, driven by the pursuit of honor and glory, the Empire is shown to use warships almost exclusively and even their support ships, such as troop transports and colony ships, are armed for battle. This contrasts with the exploration and research vessels used by Starfleet, the protagonists of the franchise. The first Klingon ship design used in The Original Series, the D7-class battlecruiser, was designed by Matt Jefferies to evoke a shape akin to that of a manta ray, providing a threatening and instantly recognizable form for viewers. The configuration of Jefferies's design featured a bulbous forward hull connected by a long boom to a wing-like main hull with the engine nacelles mounted on each wingtip. Though a variety of Klingon ships have appeared in Star Trek, their design generally conforms to this style. Most Klingon vessels were physically built as scale models, although later computer-generated imagery was used to create the models. In recent years, many of the original studio models have been sold at auctions.

All Klingon ships are equipped with some form of sublight engine, and most of these ships are equipped with superluminal propulsion technology called warp drive. Klingon vessels are usually depicted as being heavily armed, equipped with particle beam weapons called disruptors and photon torpedoes, an antimatter weapon, as primary offensive weaponry. Later Klingon ships use cloaking devices. For The Next Generation and Deep Space Nine, Klingon ships were designed by Rick Sternbach to reflect technology exchanges as a result of an alliance between the Klingons and Starfleet. In the prequel television series Enterprise, Klingon ships are designed to appear more primitive than those chronologically later in the franchise. The interior of Klingon vessels is utilitarian in nature: this is intended to mimic an old submarine. Klingon ship names are usually preceded by the prefix "IKS", an abbreviation for "Imperial Klingon Starship".

== The Original Series era ==
=== D7-class ===
The D7-class battlecruiser was designed by Matt Jefferies to mimic the appearance of a manta ray. The vessel's basic configuration was used for all subsequent Klingon ships.

The D7-class battlecruiser is the first Klingon starship observed in the Star Trek franchise. The vessel was designed by Matt Jefferies to be distinctive and quickly recognized by viewers. As Jefferies wanted the D7-class to appear "threatening, even vicious", the design was modeled on a manta ray in both basic shape and color. The spread-wing primary hull, long neck and bulbous command module configuration of the D7-class became the basic blueprint for Klingon vessels in the later television series. Jefferies's original model for the D7-class now resides in the Smithsonian Institution's National Air and Space Museum, along with the original studio model for USS Enterprise.

The D7-class model was originally produced for The Original Series episode "Elaan of Troyius"; however, as the episodes were not aired in their production order, the vessel first appeared in "The Enterprise Incident". It is shown to be armed with several disruptor banks that fire in pulses, and in the remastered version, with a torpedo launcher in the forward module. In one episode of The Animated Series, "More Tribbles, More Troubles", a D7-class battlecruiser is equipped with an experimental stasis weapon, capable of paralyzing target vessels. The vessel possesses both impulse engines and warp drive, allowing for faster-than-light travel. While Klingon vessels in the television series set after The Original Series possess cloaking devices, the Klingon D7-class does not at first. This is changed after "The Enterprise Incident", several D7-class battlecruisers are shown under Romulan control as the result of a technology exchange between the Romulans and the Klingons; these vessels use a cloaking device.

The appearance of the D7-class has been revisited several times in the Star Trek series; an entirely new studio model was created by Greg Jein for the Deep Space Nine episode "Trials and Tribble-ations". With an overall green hue, this model had a significantly more detailed hull in comparison to the bland gray of the original. A D7-class ship also appears in the Voyager episode "Prophecy"; however, as a CGI model of Jein's model was not available, the ship was instead portrayed with a CGI model of the K't'inga-class battlecruiser. The D7-class was again revisited for the remastered version of The Original Series, in which Michael Okuda created a new CGI D7-class model, with improved hull detail and Romulan bird markings for the D7-class vessels in "The Enterprise Incident". This remastered D7-class was digitally inserted into episodes earlier than their original appearances.

=== K't'inga-class ===
An upgrade of the design used for the D7-class vessel, the K't'inga-class battlecruiser was first conceived for use in the pilot episode of Star Trek: Phase II. When Phase II was abandoned, the story of the pilot was adapted for Star Trek: The Motion Picture, where three K't'inga-class battlecruisers are used in the opening scenes. Andrew Probert is credited as the designer of the K't'inga model in its design patent, while the class name was given by Gene Roddenberry in his novelization of The Motion Picture. Although sharing a nearly identical configuration with the D7-class, the primary difference in the K't'inga-class is the level of detail on the hull, enhanced to make the model appear more believable to viewers on screen. The configuration of the vessel's impulse engines also differs from that of the D7-class. The K't'inga model was later revisited for Star Trek VI: The Undiscovered Country, in which Industrial Light & Magic enhanced the original studio model with glowing engine nacelles and changed the color from muted gray-greens to light gray with gold accents and maroon paneling. ILM's alterations were meant to "contrast... with the Enterprise-A, which is very smooth and monochromatic and cool, while this Klingon ship is very regal and ostentatious and warm". A CGI version of the ship, with a slightly modified nacelle design, was created for the later seasons of Deep Space Nine; this particular model was erroneously used to represent older Klingon ships in the Voyager episode "Prophecy" and the Enterprise episode "Unexpected". The original studio model for the K't'inga-class battlecruiser was later sold in a 2006 Christie's auction for US$102,000.

The K't'inga-class battlecruiser has similar armaments to the D7-class battlecruiser, with a photon torpedo launcher in the forward module and six disruptor cannons. In addition, the ship possesses an aft torpedo launcher and can fire a powerful disruptor beam from the forward module. The Voyager episode "Flashback" also shows the K't'inga-class using concussion weapons. Unlike the D7-class, the K't'inga-class uses a cloaking device. In The Next Generation episode "The Emissary", these ships are used as sleeper ships, which could travel for decades with its crew in suspended animation. However, the class is equipped with both impulse engines and warp drive. The class is stated to have a crew of 800 and a length of 350 metres (1,150 ft). The interior of the battlecruiser was designed by Douglas Trumbull, with the intent of appearing like "an enemy submarine in World War II that's been out at sea for too long". The K't'inga-class is used extensively throughout the Star Trek series, appearing from the first feature film set in 2273 to the closing episodes of Deep Space Nine set in 2375, often appearing as a ship of the line in battle scenes.

=== Bird-of-Prey classes ===
Industrial Light & Magic's Bird-of-Prey model shows several aspects of Romulan design, as the ship was initially planned to be of Romulan origin.

The Bird-of-Prey is one of the most common Klingon ships seen in the Star Trek franchise. Introduced in Star Trek III: The Search for Spock, the Bird-of-Prey has featured in five of the films and frequently appears in The Next Generation and Deep Space Nine. Industrial Light & Magic designed and built the Bird-of-Prey for Star Trek III, assisted by the film's director, Leonard Nimoy. In early drafts of the script, the Bird-of-Prey was to be a Romulan vessel; although this idea was later dropped, the Bird-of-Prey maintained its cloaking device as a plot point in the film and the Romulan bird feather patterns on its wings were kept. The Bird-of-Prey is the first Klingon vessel depicted with a cloaking device; all classes chronologically later in the series would also use a cloaking device. The wings of the Bird-of-Prey are able to move, lowering to attack, maintaining just above horizontal in flight mode and raising high when the ship lands. However, as the studio model's mechanism for moving the wings broke, in later Star Trek series' episodes the wings are usually fixed in either flight mode or attack mode. This was not rectified until the creation of a CGI model for the vessel. The studio models for the Bird-of-Prey were sold in the 2006 Christie's auction; the original model sold for US$307,200, while an enlarged wing, used for close-up shots in Star Trek V: The Final Frontier, was sold for US$8,400. The Boeing Bird of Prey developed by McDonnell Douglas's Phantom Works division was named after the Klingon Bird-of-Prey.

Although several variants are seen throughout the franchise, design notes state that the Bird-of-Prey has two main classes: the B'rel-class and the K'Vort-class. Both classes used the same studio model, differing in sizes in proportion to other starships depending on variant. The B'rel-class is a scout vessel, used for espionage, skirmishes and raids, while the K'Vort-class is a light cruiser. Both classes are armed with disruptor cannons mounted on the tips of the wings and a forward torpedo launcher. Likewise, both classes are equipped with cloaking devices and are capable of impulse and warp speeds. These design notes for the show hold that with a crew of only 12 and a length of 160 metres (520 ft), the B'rel-class is far smaller than the K'Vort-class, which measures 320 metres (1,050 ft) and possesses a crew of around 300. In its onscreen appearances, however, the Bird-of-Prey model was not scaled consistently to these notes, creating the impression of ships both far larger and smaller than the design notes intended. The interior of the Bird-of-Prey is similar to that of Douglas Trumbull's submarine-like designs for the K't'inga-class; some Birds of Prey are even shown with periscopes to allow the captain to personally target weapons. Despite relatively light armaments, Birds of Prey are shown to be effective craft; both the USS Enterprise and USS Enterprise-D are destroyed in part due to the activity of Birds of Prey. Most cloak-capable Star Trek vessels are unable to use weapons when cloaked; the film Star Trek VI: The Undiscovered Country features a modified experimental Bird-of-Prey that appeared to be able to fire torpedoes while cloaked although later observations revealed that the ship briefly decloaked.

== The Next Generation era ==
=== Vor'cha-class ===
Rick Sternbach's design of the Vor'cha-class attack cruiser was meant to illustrate the alliance between the Klingons and Federation, with engines reminiscent of Starfleet ships.

The Vor'cha-class attack cruiser is a powerful Klingon vessel that debuted in The Next Generation episode "Reunion". Its combat role is stated to be comparable to that of a heavy cruiser. The Vor'cha-class is the first new Klingon ship design portrayed outside of The Original Series era, and was designed by Rick Sternbach. The studio model for the ship was built by Greg Jein. Sternbach designed the Vor'cha-class to represent the alliance between the United Federation of Planets and the Klingon Empire by The Next Generation, and consequent technology exchange and collaboration. Thus, the nacelles of the craft were created to be similar to those on Starfleet vessels, while the color was intentionally placed as a midpoint between the dark green of the Bird of Prey and the light gray of the USS Enterprise-D. Sternbach's original concept sketches for the Vor'cha-class were sold at an auction in 2003 for US$850, while a studio model for the debris of a destroyed Vor'cha-class cruiser was sold on eBay in 2006 for US$1,025.

The design of the Vor'cha-class maintains the typical Klingon configuration with a forward module supported by a thick horizontal neck running aft and spreads out into a larger secondary hull. With a crew of 1,900 and a length of 500 metres (1,600 ft), Vor'cha-class vessels are one of the largest Klingon ships in the Star Trek universe. They are heavily armed, sporting 18 disruptor cannons as well as three photon torpedo launchers. In addition, the forward section of the cruiser is equipped with a particularly powerful disruptor beam. The ships are equipped with both warp and impulse engines, and make use of cloaking devices. In the Deep Space Nine episode "Return to Grace", the cruiser is stated to have enough firepower to threaten subterranean bases with orbital bombardments. The Vor'cha-class is frequently seen in The Next Generation and Deep Space Nine episodes depicting Klingon ships; in its earliest appearances, the class represents the flagship of the Empire, under the command of first Klingon Chancellor K'mpec and later Gowron. Later appearances use the ship as the mainstay vessel in Klingon fleet engagements.

=== Negh'Var-class ===
The Negh'Var-class warship is one of the largest and most heavily armed Klingon vessels seen in the Star Trek franchise. The class initially was designed by Rick Sternbach to appear as a Klingon attack cruiser for an alternate timeline in "All Good Things...", the series finale of The Next Generation. Sternbach built the studio model for the vessel on top of the existing studio model for the Vor'cha-class attack cruiser. A slightly modified studio model was used in the Deep Space Nine episode "The Way of the Warrior", in which the Negh'Var-class is properly introduced to the audience. A CGI version of the model was eventually produced for the Voyager series finale "Endgame", incorporating elements from the models used in both "All Good Things..." and "The Way of the Warrior". The Negh'Var-class is also used in the episodes "Shattered Mirror" and "The Emperor's New Cloak" as a flagship in the Mirror Universe; this version is meant to be far larger than the prime universe Negh'Var-class, to this end a 7.62 metres (25.0 ft) model of the underside of the vessel was created to dwarf the studio model of the USS Defiant in combat sequences. The studio model for the Negh'Var-class was sold in a 2007 auction for US$7,500.

The warship is introduced as the new flagship of the Klingon Empire in "The Way of the Warrior", under command of Chancellor Gowron and General Martok. As the studio model is built upon that of the Vor'cha-class, the Negh'Var-class shares many similarities in design in relation to the vessel's shape, color and nacelles. However, with a length of nearly 700 metres (2,300 ft) and a crew of 2,500, the Negh'Var-class is substantially bigger than the Vor'cha-class. The ship is equipped with a cloaking device. The class is heavily armed, with 20 disruptor banks and four torpedo launchers, as well as a large forward disruptor cannon protruding from the forward section. The Negh'Var-class only appears in a few episodes; other than in the climactic battle of "The Way of the Warrior", it is not used in any fleet battle scenes.

== Enterprise era ==
=== D4-class ===
The D4-class battlecruiser was a proposed design for the first Klingon vessel to appear in Enterprise. The vessel was originally designed for usage in the fourth episode of the series, "Unexpected". Designed by John Eaves, the D4-class was meant to represent a direct predecessor to Jefferies's D7-class. The design was similar to that of the D7-class, closely following its configuration and shape and incorporating a more rugged and primitive construction to make the ship appear consistent with the earlier time period. Eaves's team was able to finish the design and Foundation Imaging created a computer-generated model for the episode. However, the producers rejected the model because they disliked how the model's windows were not prominent as they were on other ship designs, stating that it could only be used if significant changes were made to the vessel. With only a few hours before the episode's deadline for delivery and exhausted from their recent work on "Broken Bow", the pilot episode of Enterprise, Eaves's team was unable to work through the night to make the alterations. Therefore, the producers decided to use an older CGI model in its place; the only other model available was a K't'inga-class battlecruiser made for Deep Space Nine. The use of the K't'inga-class created a continuity error in the series, with the same ship design seemingly in use for 225 years. thus, the producers decided that the K't'inga-class model would not be used again as it did not fit with Enterprise's theme. The designers involved later voiced their regret at having to use the older model, but acknowledged that there was no alternative due to the team's exhaustion.

=== Raptor-class ===
The Raptor-class is the first new Klingon ship design depicted in Enterprise. The vessel is the subject of the first-season episode "Sleeping Dogs". Produced by Herman Zimmerman's art department, it was the first Klingon ship to debut as a completely computer-generated model. John Eaves was responsible for developing the basic shape of the Raptor-class in concept art; Doug Drexler later refined Eaves's sketches to create a CGI mesh using LightWave 3D. Foundation Imaging converted Drexler's work into the final CGI model seen in the episode. Eaves's objective was to make the craft appear more primitive than the Klingon ships later in the franchise's chronology, with exposed piping and rugged design. Eaves stated that the design was made to look "like it is made up of different pieces that are attached to one another, as opposed to a uniform shape". Several designs of various sizes were proposed before Zimmerman settled on the Raptor-class. While the vessel is lightly based on Industrial Light & Magic's Bird of Prey, Eaves attempted to make the craft appear as a precursor to the D7-class. Drexler, who worked closely with Eaves during the creation of the CGI mesh, was allowed to deal with the closer details of the model, such as the position of the shuttlebay. Drexler felt that the design held qualities of both a PT boat and a 19th-century ironclad warship. The overall style of Eaves's design was later used as the basis for future Klingon ships in Enterprise.

Designated as a scout vessel, the Raptor-class is depicted as a stalwart vessel. Its hull, stated to be twice as thick as that of the Enterprise NX-01, can survive the pressures in the top 2 kilometres (6,600 ft) of a gas giant's atmosphere. Although designed by the production team as a precursor to the D7-class, the Raptor-class is far smaller; Eaves stated that his design would have had a crew of around 12. The ship is armed with two torpedo launchers and a disruptor array mounted towards the back of the ship. Like most Klingon ships, it has both impulse and warp drive. The Raptor-class only appears in one episode in the series, although its schematics are visible on several computer screens in later episodes.

=== D5-class ===
The D5-class cruiser is the primary Klingon capital ship used in Enterprise. Designed by John Eaves and compiled as a CGI model by Pierre Drolet of EdenFX, The D5 employed a basic Klingon battlecruiser shape: a small forward hull attached by a long, horizontal boom to a larger engineering hull, with aft-mounted impulse drive units above and two warp engines at the end of backswept pylons. The design is distinct from that of the chronologically later D7 ships by its bigger and less spherical forward hull, its larger, tapered nacelles, and engine pylons that sweep backward, not forward. The D5 was initially developed for the episode "Marauders" as a freighter, with visible cargo tanks on the model. This version of the ship was not held to be much of a threat to the Enterprise NX-01.

The episode "Judgement" introduced the battlecruiser variant at the behest of producer Rick Berman. The episode originally intended to use a D7-class battlecruiser, but Berman decided that a less advanced ship should be displayed, using the D5 designation. Thus the tanker model was modified to become the D5-class battlecruiser, and would be used for the rest of the show as this era's most powerful Klingon ship. Unlike the tanker, the D5-class was depicted as outmatching the Enterprise by a considerable margin. The battlecruiser possessed both disruptor beams and cannons, as well as forward and aft torpedoes, and is shown as capable of orbital bombardment. The ship was heavily armoured in addition to its shielding, and was capable of warp six. The designers intended and scaled the D5-class's onscreen appearances to be 155 metres (509 ft) in length; however, an onscreen panel notes a length of only 75 metres (246 ft).

Prior to the ship's appearance in Enterprise, the D5-class was alluded to in the Deep Space Nine episode "Once More Unto The Breach". Klingon commander Kor recalls that he commanded a D5-class ship called the IKS Klothos, an intentional reference by writer Ronald D. Moore to The Animated Series episode "The Time Trap". In that episode, the Klothos was depicted as a D7-class battlecruiser, the only Klingon ship design that existed at the time of production.

=== Bird-of-Prey ===
The Bird-of-Prey of the Enterprise era was intended as a predecessor to the Bird-of-Prey model originally designed for Star Trek III. The ship was designed by John Eaves, who used an abandoned concept for a modified Bird-of-Prey intended for Deep Space Nine as his starting point. The end design submitted by Eaves drew elements from this design sketch together with the previously debuted Raptor and D5-class ships, while echoing the original Bird-of-Prey design. The final design attaches an angular forward command section to a substantive engine section via a neck, with two warp nacelles placed above the ship's central impulse engine. Feather-patterned wings sweep downward to heavy weapons mounted on the tips. Elements from the abandoned D4-class design, such as exposed cabling, were also added to create a rougher appearing ship. The CGI model was created by Koji Kuramura at EdenFX. The Bird-of-Prey debuted in the episode "The Expanse" and made multiple appearances across Enterprise, used in roles such as a patrol ship or a destroyer accompanying the bigger D5-class battlecruiser. The design was intended to be 145 metres (476 ft) long with a top speed of warp 5, and was heavily armed with several wing, neck and head mounted disruptor cannons, and fore and aft photon torpedo launchers. A large belly cannon on the underside of the ship was placed by Eaves to evoke the design of the A-10 Thunderbolt.

== See also ==
- Boeing Bird of Prey
