= Pato Guzman =

Chilean and American artist (1933–1991)

Patricio "Pato" Guzmán (1933–1991), a native of Chile, worked in the United States as an art director, production designer, and producer of television and film. He worked on such notable shows as The Jack Benny Program, I Love Lucy, The Lucy Show, and That Girl. He also served as a production designer for the Star Trek: The Original Series pilot "The Cage" (uncredited) and in that capacity worked directly with art director Matt Jeffries and creator-producer Gene Roddenberry on the design of the original USS Enterprise NCC-1701 exterior and bridge. In the 1980s, Guzman worked with director Paul Mazursky on the films Tempest, Moscow on the Hudson, Down and Out in Beverly Hills, and Enemies, A Love Story.
