= Michael Minor =

American illustrator and art director (1940–1987)

- Born: September 25, 1940
- Died: May 4, 1987 (aged 46)
- Occupation(s): Illustrator, Art director

Michael Minor (September 25, 1940 – May 4, 1987) was an American illustrator and art director on Star Trek: The Original Series, Star Trek: The Motion Picture and Star Trek II: The Wrath of Khan.

Minor, along with Joseph Jennings, Andrew Probert, Douglas Trumbull and Harold Michelson, designed the refit USS Enterprise for Star Trek: The Motion Picture, based on Matt Jefferies' original USS Enterprise design for the television series.

For a period during the 1970s, Minor worked at Griffith Observatory in Los Angeles, where he created a lunar panorama for the planetarium based on images from the Apollo missions.

When Harve Bennett, a new Paramount television producer, was hired to create a cheaper, better sequel to The Motion Picture, he chose Minor to help shape the art direction.

Minor won an Emmy Award nomination for his visual effects work on the acclaimed 1983 mini-series The Winds of War. He would later garner an Emmy nomination in "Outstanding Art Direction for a Limited Series or a Special" for The Winds of War.

Other credits include work on The Lost Saucer (1975–1976), The Man Who Saw Tomorrow (1981), the 1982 fantasy film The Beastmaster, and Remo Williams: The Adventure Begins (1985).
