= Starship Enterprise =

Series of fictional Star Trek spaceships

Enterprise or USS Enterprise, often referred to as the Starship Enterprise, is the name of several spacecraft in the Star Trek science fiction franchise.

The Enterprise made for the original Star Trek television series has been called an iconic design, and it influenced subsequent spacecraft in and outside the franchise. Several vessels named Enterprise have been the main setting for various Star Trek spinoff series and films.

== Design history ==
=== The original Star Trek and first films ===
Matt Jefferies designed the first of many starships named Enterprise in the Star Trek franchise.

Ship: USS Enterprise, NCC-1701
Introduction: Star Trek (1966–1969)
In-universe service: 2245–2273 (refit)
The USS Enterprise, led by Captain James T. Kirk, is the main setting of the original Star Trek series and Star Trek: The Animated Series (1973–74). Matt Jefferies designed the ship, and its core components – a saucer-shaped primary hull, and cylindrical secondary hull, and a pair of outriding engine nacelles – established the core ship design for the franchise. Enterprise footage was rotoscoped for its depiction in the animated spinoff.

The same filming model was used to depict two different vessels named Enterprise in the franchise's first six films.

Ship: Refit USS Enterprise, NCC-1701
Introduction: Star Trek: The Motion Picture (1979)
In-universe service: 2273–2285 (destroyed)
Jefferies created an updated Enterprise design for the Star Trek: Phase II series. He left the project when Phase II halted and production began on the first Star Trek film, Star Trek: The Motion Picture. Several artists, including Andrew Probert, contributed to the film redesign. Several aspects of the ship, such as the engine nacelle grills, were influenced by art deco. The ship's significantly different appearance compared to the television show was attributed to an 18-month refit. The ship is heavily damaged in Star Trek II: The Wrath of Khan (1982), and is destroyed in Star Trek III: The Search for Spock (1984).

Ship: USS Enterprise, NCC-1701-A
Introduction: Star Trek IV: The Voyage Home (1986)
In-universe service: 2286–2292 (decommissioned)
Captain Kirk is given command of a new vessel named Enterprise at the end of Star Trek IV. Despite being a new ship narratively, the producers used the same filming model, redressed to include the new "NCC-1701-A" registry. The vessel appears in the next two films, Star Trek V: The Final Frontier (1989) and Star Trek VI: The Undiscovered Country (1991). The ship is ordered decommissioned at the end of the sixth film, and it later appears as part of the Starfleet Museum in the third season of Star Trek: Picard (2023).

=== The Next Generation productions ===
Andrew Probert designed a new Enterprise for a television series that takes place a century after the original Star Trek.

Ship: USS Enterprise, NCC-1701-D
Introduction: Star Trek: The Next Generation (1987–1994)
In-universe service: 2363–2371 (destroyed, rebuilt by 2401)
Andrew Probert designed the Enterprise created for the franchise's return to television, taking place on a new Enterprise led by Captain Jean-Luc Picard 70 years after the events in the original series. This Enterprise also appears in the first film featuring the Next Generation cast, Star Trek Generations (1994). The ship's engineering section is destroyed in Generations, but its saucer section crash lands on an alien planet. In the third season of Star Trek: Picard, Geordi La Forge reveals he has been restoring the Enterprise for 20 years. The saucer section has been attached to a different vessel's engineering hull, and it features prominently in the show's climax before becoming part of the Fleet Museum.

Producers created a ship meant to bridge the gap in appearance between the Excelsior class and the Enterprise-D for the episode "Yesterday's Enterprise".

Ship: USS Enterprise, NCC-1701-C
Introduction: "Yesterday's Enterprise" (1990) episode of Star Trek: The Next Generation
In-universe service: c. 2344 (destroyed)
A third-season episode of The Next Generation includes a depiction of the Enterprise-D's predecessor, the Enterprise-C. Rick Sternbach used an illustration created by Andrew Probert as the design basis for the Enterprise-C, executing a final design that could be more easily produced on a television episode's budget. Led by Captain Rachel Garrett, the Enterprise-C is destroyed protecting a Klingon outpost from a Romulan attack, strengthening an alliance between the Federation and the Klingon Empire.

The opening sequence of Star Trek: Generations was an opportunity to depict the Excelsior-class Enterprise-B.

Ship: USS Enterprise, NCC-1701-B
Introduction: Star Trek: Generations (1994)
In-universe service: 2293 – c. 2340s (fate unknown)
The opening of Generations depicts the maiden voyage of the Enterprise-B, during which James Kirk is lost and presumed dead. The vessel serves after Kirk's Enterprise-A and before the Enterprise-C from "Yesterday's Enterprise". The filming model was a modification of the Excelsior created for Star Trek III, with some components added to depict damage to the ship without harming the underlying model.

The loss of the Enterprise-D in Generations created the opportunity to design a new vessel for the sequel, First Contact.

Ship: USS Enterprise, NCC-1701-E
Introduction: Star Trek: First Contact (1996)
In-universe service: 2372 – c. 2380s (fate unknown)
With the Enterprise-D's loss in Generations, a new film vessel for Picard and his crew was designed as the main setting for its sequels: Star Trek: First Contact, Star Trek: Insurrection (1998), and Star Trek: Nemesis (2002). It also appears in the first-season finale of Star Trek: Prodigy (2022) and the series finale of Star Trek: Lower Decks (2024). The ship is disabled or destroyed under Worf's command. In 2018 and 2019, io9 and SyFy, respectively, ranked the Enterprise-E, as the third-best version of starship Enterprise of the Star Trek franchise. In 2014, a building in China was designed to resemble the ship.

=== Return to television ===
The eponymous Enterprise is depicted in service 100 years before the events in the original Star Trek.

Ship: Enterprise, NX-01
Introduction: Star Trek: Enterprise (2001–2005)
In-universe service: 2151–2161 (decommissioned)
Starfleet's Enterprise is the main setting of Star Trek: Enterprise, which takes places a century before the original Star Trek. Under the command of Captain Jonathan Archer, the vessel is the first Earth-built starship capable of reaching Warp 5. Initial designs of the Enterprise were deemed too similar to the original 1960s vessel. The final design, created by Doug Drexler, is based on the features of the Akira class created by Alex Jeager for Star Trek: First Contact.

As part of the show's Temporal Cold War arc, Captain Archer travels to the 26th century's Enterprise-J in "Azati Prime".

Ship: USS Enterprise, NCC-1701-J
Introduction: "Azati Prime" episode of Star Trek: Enterprise (2004)
In-universe service: c. 26th century (fate unknown)

A third-season episode of Enterprise involves Captain Archer being transported to the 26th-century Enterprise-J. Doug Drexler drew the first design only two days prior to the production meeting for the episode. The computer-generated model was created in a few hours, and Drexler later said that they would have finished it differently. He imagined that the vessel was so large that there would be universities and entire parks on board, with the turbolifts replaced by short range transporters. More than one design was created, with the final version created with elements from different designs.

=== Film franchise reboot ===
The new film franchise made the Enterprise larger and more of a "hot rod".

Ships: USS Enterprise, NCC-1701 and USS Enterprise, NCC-1701-A
Introduction: Star Trek (2009)
In-universe service: 2258–2263 (destroyed)
A new Enterprise was designed for the film franchise relaunch, which began with Star Trek and continued with Star Trek Into Darkness (2013) and Star Trek Beyond (2016). The new Enterprise was conceived as a "hot rod" while retaining elements from the original Enterprise and Motion Picture refit. At the end of Star Trek Into Darkness, Enterprise has started its five-year mission under Captain Kirk. The ship is destroyed in Star Trek Beyond, and a successor Enterprise, with registry NCC-1701-A, is commissioned at the film's conclusion.

=== Streaming services ===
Ship: USS Enterprise, NCC-1701
Introduction: "Will You Take My Hand?" episode of Star Trek: Discovery (2018)
In-universe service: 2245–2273 (refit)
Star Trek: Discovery's first-season finale, and several episodes of the second season, depict the USS Enterprise under the command of Captain Christopher Pike. Star Trek: Strange New Worlds (2022–present) focuses on Pike's command of the Enterprise, whose exterior and interiors were slightly modified from their Discovery appearance. John Eaves, Scott Schneider, and William Budge redesigned the Enterprise for its appearance in the streaming series.

Originally designed by a fan for a Star Trek Online contest, the Enterprise-F makes a brief appearance in Star Trek: Picard.

Ship: USS Enterprise, NCC-1701-F
Introduction: "Võx" episode of Star Trek: Picard (2023)
In-universe service: c. 2401 (decommissioned)
This ship appears in the penultimate episode of Star Trek: Picard (2023) at the Frontier Day festival. The ship was originally designed by Adam Ihle as part of a fan competition for Star Trek Online. Ihle's design has a "familiar and recognizable" shape while also offering an evolution in design. Star Trek Online artist Thomas Marrone updated the video game asset, and then sent the model to the series artists to incorporate into the show.

After appearing throughout Picard's third season as the USS Titan, the vessel is renamed USS Enterprise in the series finale.

Ship: USS Enterprise, NCC-1701-G
In-universe service: 2402– (fate unknown)
Introduction: "The Last Generation" episode of Star Trek: Picard (2023)
The USS Titan is the main setting for the third season of Star Trek: Picard. In the series finale, that vessel is renamed USS Enterprise and placed under the command of Captain Seven of Nine. The ship is based on designs by Bill Krause.

== Reception and influence ==
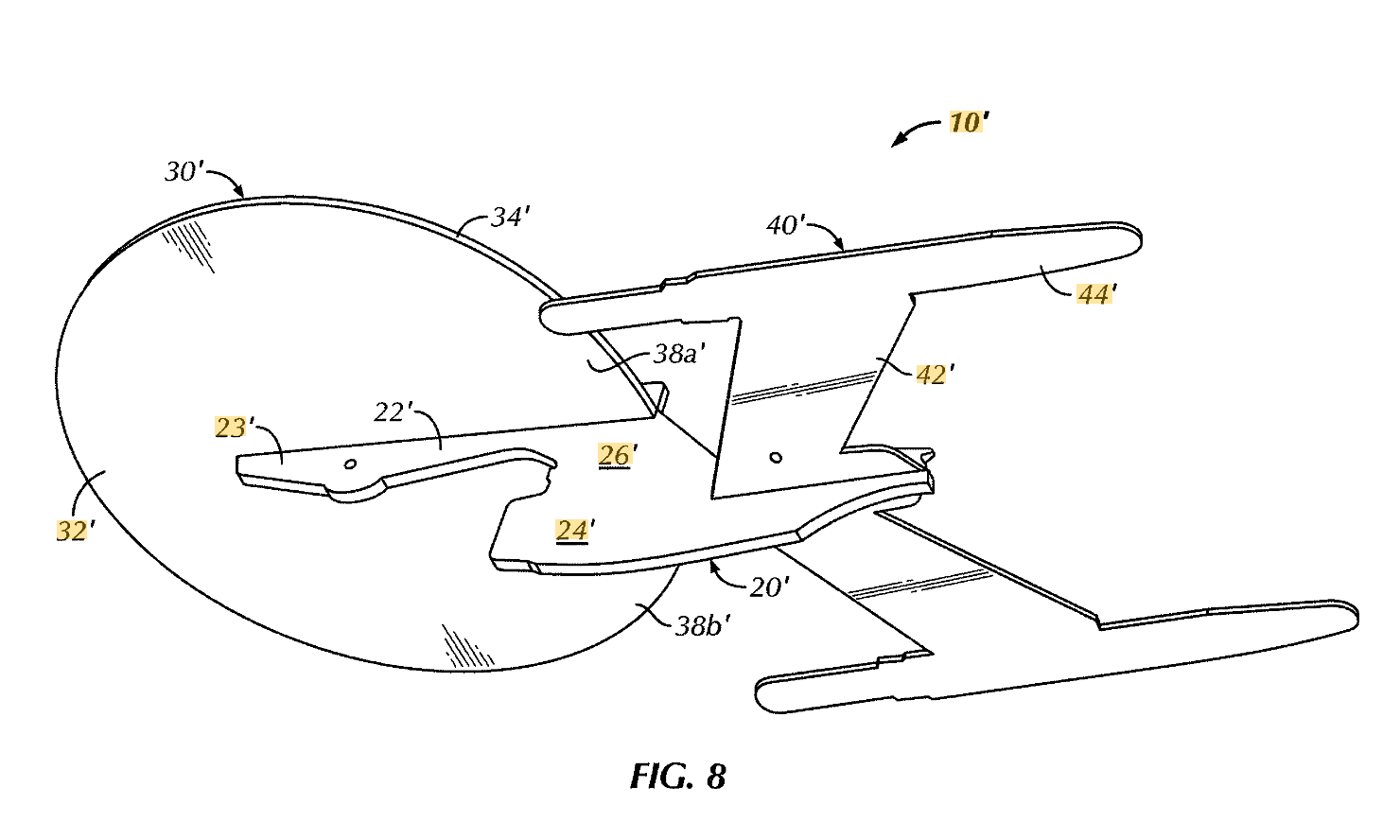
Mattel's 2009 patent for a flying toy is based on "the fictional and imaginary star ships "Enterprise" created for the Star Trek science fiction television series and movies." The shape includes the core design shapes from Matt Jefferies' original Enterprise design.

Time described each iteration of the Enterprise as "a character in its own right". io9 ranked the original design of the Enterprise as the best version of the Enterprise lineage, characterizing the original as still superior to all later versions. By contrast, SyFy ranked the refit design of the Enterprise from The Motion Picture and its sequels as the franchise's best.

Over many decades, the starship has influenced activities of NASA. This includes a successful letter writing campaign by fans to name the initial flight-test Space Shuttle Enterprise, and NASA's decision to name its IXS Enterprise advanced propulsion concept vehicle after the Star Trek vessel. NetDragon Websoft based the design of its Fuzhou headquarters building on the Enterprise-E under an official license from CBS.

Celebrity astrophysicist Neil deGrasse Tyson has spoken highly of the influence and legacy of the original Enterprise on other fictional spaceships. Drawing a parallel to comparing athletes between eras, he said of spaceship design, "What matters is not what they look like now, but what they looked to others at the time that they prevailed... There is only one spaceship that's earlier than [the original Enterprise], and that's the flying saucer from The Day the Earth Stood Still. So, what matters here is, what did [the Enterprise] look like at the time it came out (1966) compared with anything that had been imagined before? And when you consider that, that is the most astonishing machine that has ever graced the screen." On the ship's influence upon scientists, Tyson wrote, "The Enterprise was the first ever spaceship represented in storytelling that was not designed to go from one place to another; [it was] only designed to explore. It was revolutionary in terms of what we would think space would, and should, be about."

== See also ==
- VSS Enterprise, proposed first commercial spacecraft
