= USS Enterprise (NCC-1701) =

Fictional starship in Star Trek with registry number NCC-1701

- Star Trek vehicle
- USS Enterprise (NCC-1701) as it appears in promotional material for the remastered original Star Trek series
- First appearance: "The Man Trap"; Star Trek; 1966
- Last appearance: "Tomorrow's Enterprise"; Star Trek: Strange New Worlds; 2026
- Created by: Matt Jefferies

Information
- Affiliation: United Federation of Planets; Starfleet
- Launched: 2245
- Captain: Robert April; Christopher Pike; James T. Kirk; Willard Decker; Spock
- Auxiliary vehicles: Shuttlecraft

General characteristics
- Class: Constitution
- Registry: NCC-1701
- Armaments: Phasers; Photon torpedoes
- Defenses: Deflector shields
- Propulsion: Thrusters; Impulse drive Warp drive
- Power: Matter/antimatter reaction

USS Enterprise (NCC-1701) is the first in a series of starships in the Star Trek media franchise. Enterprise is the main setting of the original Star Trek television series (1966–69), Star Trek: The Animated Series (1973-74), nine Star Trek films, and Star Trek: Strange New Worlds (2022–present). The vessels carry their crew on a mission "to explore strange, new worlds; to seek out new life and new civilizations; to boldly go where no one has gone before."

Matt Jefferies designed the Enterprise for television, and its core components – a flying saucer-shaped primary hull, two offset engine nacelles, and a cylindrical secondary hull – persisted across several television and film redesigns. The vessel influenced the design of subsequent franchise spacecraft, including other vessels named Enterprise, and the model filmed for the original Star Trek TV series has been on display for decades at the National Air and Space Museum.

Initially a vision of the potential for human spaceflight, the Enterprise has been identified as one of the most influential science fiction spacecraft.

== Development and production ==
=== Concept and initial design ===
Series creator Gene Roddenberry reviewed hundreds of science fiction magazines, dating back to 1931, to gather ideas about what he wanted Star Trek's main vessel to look like. Despite the research, he was more confident in what he did not want than what he did want. He set several parameters:

We're [...] out in deep space, on the equivalent of a cruiser-size spaceship. We don't know what the mode of power is, but I don't want to see any trails of fire. No streaks of smoke, no jet intakes, rocket exhaust, or anything like that [...]. It will be like a deep space exploration vehicle, operating throughout our galaxy.

The first color rendering of the Enterprise design; soon after, Jefferies would realize the design into a small wooden model. Note the prototypical elements used in Enterprise redesigns, other franchise vessels named Enterprise, and numerous other Star Trek spacecraft: a disc-like primary hull, a pair of offset engine nacelles, and a cylindrical secondary hull.

Roddenberry further specified that the ship would have a crew of 100–150 and be incredibly fast. Art director Pato Guzman's assistant, Matt Jefferies, was responsible for designing the ship and several of its sets. Jefferies and Roddenberry did not want the vessel to look like any of the rocket ships already used by the aerospace industry or in popular culture; many designs were rejected for being "too conventional". To meet Roddenberry's requirement that the ship look believable, Jefferies tried "to visualize what the fourth, fifth or tenth generation of present-day equipment would be like". Jefferies' experience with aviation let him imbue his designs with what he called "aircraft logic". He imagined the ship's engines would be too powerful to be near the crew, requiring them to be set apart from the hull. Jefferies initially rejected a disk-shaped component, worried about the similarities to flying saucers; however, a spherical module eventually flattened into a disk. Because the ship would be expected to flash by quickly on television screens, Jefferies wanted the design to be "very simple, but immediately identifiable – a shape that you could instantly pick out."

During a visit with Jefferies, Roddenberry and NBC staff were drawn to a sketch of the ship resembling its final configuration. Jefferies had created a small model of this design that, when held from a string, hung upside-down – an appearance he had to "unsell". He kept the hull smooth, with a sense that the ship's components were serviced from inside. He designed the Klingon starship seen in the third season by rearranging and changing the shape of Enterprise's basic modules: a main body, two engine pods, and a neck with a head on it. Some of Jefferies' rejected design concepts – such as spherical hull sections and warp engines that encircle a ship – inspired future Star Trek vessel designs.

The Enterprise was originally named Yorktown, but Roddenberry was fascinated by the aircraft carrier Enterprise and had "always been proud of that ship and wanted to use the name." The NCC-1701 registry stems from NC being one of the international aircraft registration codes assigned to the United States. The second C was added because Soviet aircraft used Cs, and Jefferies believed a venture into space would be a joint operation by the United States and Russia. Jefferies rejected 3, 6, 8, and 9 as "too easily confused" on screen; he eventually reasoned the Enterprise was the first vessel of Starfleet's 17th starship design, hence 1701. The Making of Star Trek explains that USS means "United Space Ship" and that "Enterprise is a member of the Starship Class". Licensed texts, on-screen graphics, and dialogue later describe the ship as a Constitution-class vessel.

=== Filming models ===
The 33-inch (0.8 m) model on display at the MIT Museum in 2026. The model went missing during the 1970s and was discovered and restored in the 2020s.

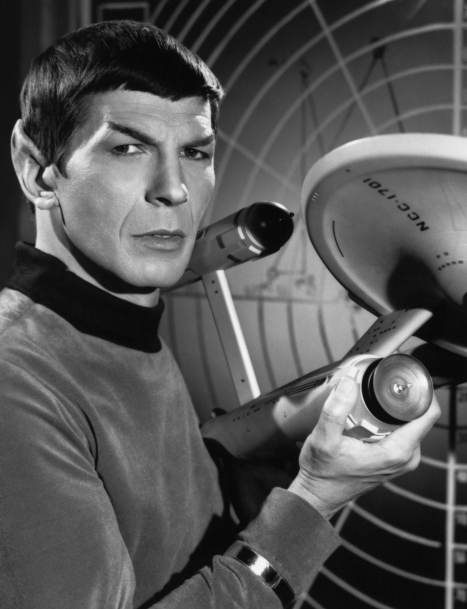
Leonard Nimoy poses as Spock with the first filming model.

The first miniature built from Jefferies' drawings was a 4-inch (100 mm) scale model. Desilu Studios, which produced Star Trek, hired Richard C. Datin to make a pre-production model. Datin used a subcontractor with a large lathe for major subcomponents and otherwise worked on the model for approximately 110 hours during November 1964. The 33-inch (0.84 m) model was made mostly of pine, with Plexiglass and brass details. Datin made minor changes after Roddenberry's review, and he submitted the completed model – which cost about $600 (equivalent to $6,229 in 2025) – to Desilu in December 1964.

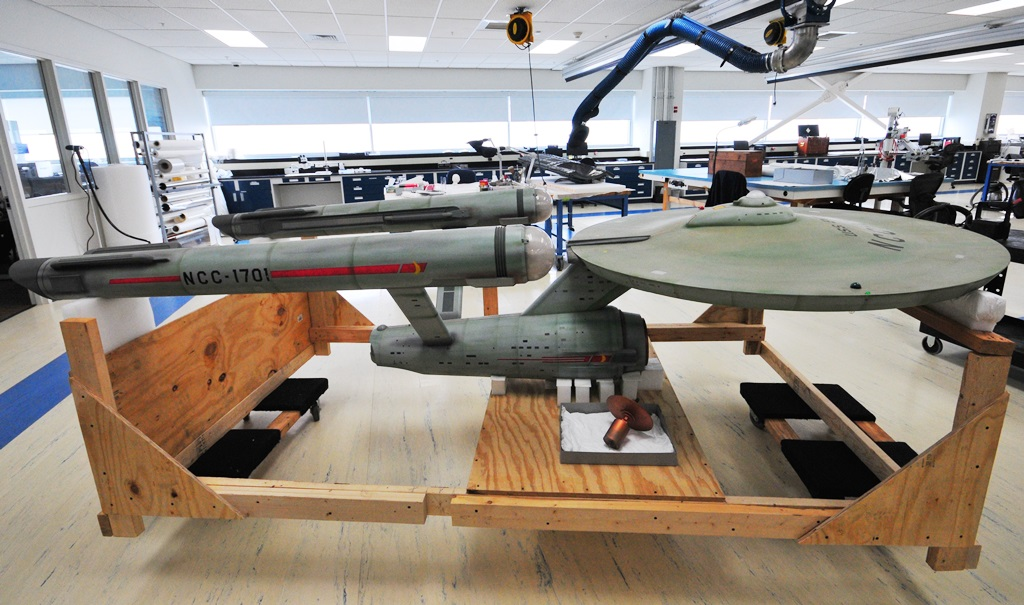
The 11-foot (3.4 m) filming model, which Paramount Pictures donated to the Smithsonian Institution in 1974

Desilu then ordered a larger filming model, which Datin contracted to Volmer Jensen and Production Model Shop in Burbank. Datin supervised the work and did detailing on the model, which was constructed from plaster, sheet metal, and wood. When completed, it was 135 inches (3.43 m) long, weighed 125 kilograms (276 lb), and cost $6,000 (equivalent to $61,299 in 2025). The model was delivered too late to be used much for the initial pilot, "The Cage". When Roddenberry was approved to film the second pilot, "Where No Man Has Gone Before" (1966), various details of this 11-foot model were altered, and the starboard windows and running lights were internally illuminated. When the series went into production, the model was altered again, and it was regularly modified throughout its active filming. Most of the fine details on the large model were not visible to television viewers. Wiring for the interior lighting ran into the model on its left side, so it could only be filmed from the right; for shots requiring the other side of the Enterprise, the footage was either flipped or filmed using the 33-inch model. Because of this, some of the fine details added to the model were added only to its right side. The model was filmed with an 18mm lens "to accentuate the speed of travel as well as retain an adequate depth of field."

The 11-foot model was initially filmed by Howard Anderson. Anderson's team struggled to film the model in a way that suggested it was moving at tremendous speeds, as the producers wanted to avoid the cliched look of a spacecraft drifting through space. Additionally, the model was so large there was little room in the filming space for the camera to move around it. Anderson could not keep up with the filming and special effects needs for regular production, so producers hired several other studios to contribute effects and additional footage. Motion control equipment was too expensive, so the ship was filmed with stop motion. Filming was often delayed by the heat generated by the studio and model's lights. Most third-season footage of the Enterprise was reused first- or second-season footage. Special effects were produced as cheaply as possible. Animators for Star Trek: The Animated Series (1973–75) rotoscoped Enterprise footage to recreate the ship's movements, contributing to the impression of the animated series being a fourth season of the original. The animated show's limited color palette could not accommodate all of the ship's various colors, so the Enterprise was depicted as a consistent gray.

=== Sets, sounds, and fixtures ===
The Enterprise was meant to serve as a familiar, recurring setting, similar to Dodge City in Gunsmoke and Blair General Hospital in Dr. Kildare. Guzman created the first bridge set design in 1964. The bridge was monochromatic for "The Cage", but it was redecorated for "Where No Man Has Gone Before" because of the increasing popularity of color televisions. The first pilot episode's bridge set was rigid, making it difficult for cameras to move in. For series production, the bridge set was rebuilt modularly, allowing large sections to be removed to make camera movement easier. The complicated electronics that provided bridge set readouts and lights required expensive air conditioning to avoid overheating. The chairs used on the bridge and other sets were manufactured by Burke of Dallas and were similar to the tulip chair designed by Eero Saarinen. When production ended after the third season, major elements of the bridge set were donated to the UCLA Theater Arts Department; the remaining components were discarded.

Reusing sets helped address Desilu's budget concerns. The engine room, whose sense of scale was enhanced by the use of forced perspective, was redressed as the shuttlebay. Other sets that were redressed to save costs included the briefing room, which also served as the recreation room and cargo deck; and Kirk's cabin, which was also Spock's. Going into the show's second season, NBC executives pressed the production to have fewer episodes based on the ship, and more that occur on alien worlds. In April 1968, Roddenberry pushed back, comparing the Enterprise to the home and ranch on Bonanza, the location of some of that show's best episodes. He also said they would create new Enterprise sets to "help counteract any 'sameness' about the ship". Roddenberry described the ship's hallways as "Des Moines Holiday Inn Style". To keep the ship from looking too sterile, Mike Minor created paintings that hung in Kirk's quarters, the recreation area, and the upper rim of the bridge.

As production continued, standing sets like the engine room and bridge became increasingly detailed. Jefferies and associate producer Bob Justman walked through the production lots looking for "serendipitous items" that could be modified into set details to enhance the interiors. Jefferies added new details to a portable maintenance tunnel set each time it was used. The production staff called the set the "Jefferies tube" as an inside joke, and the term is used in dialogue to describe similar crawl spaces in spinoffs.

Sound effects designer Doug Grindstaff created sounds for different parts of the vessel: console sound effects were often created with a Hammond electric organ or other musical instrument, and engine sounds were created in part with a noisy air conditioner. Although there is no sound in space, producers thought that dramatic license required the ship to make noise during exterior shots. The sound of the ship "whoosh"ing past in the main title sequence was recorded by composer Alexander Courage.

Although the interior in The Animated Series was largely recreated from the live action series, a second turbolift was added to the bridge in response to Roddenberry being asked, "What do they do if the [one turbolift's] doors get stuck?" Franz Joseph designed full Enterprise interior deck plans in 1974 with approval from Roddenberry.

=== 1970s redesigns for television and film ===
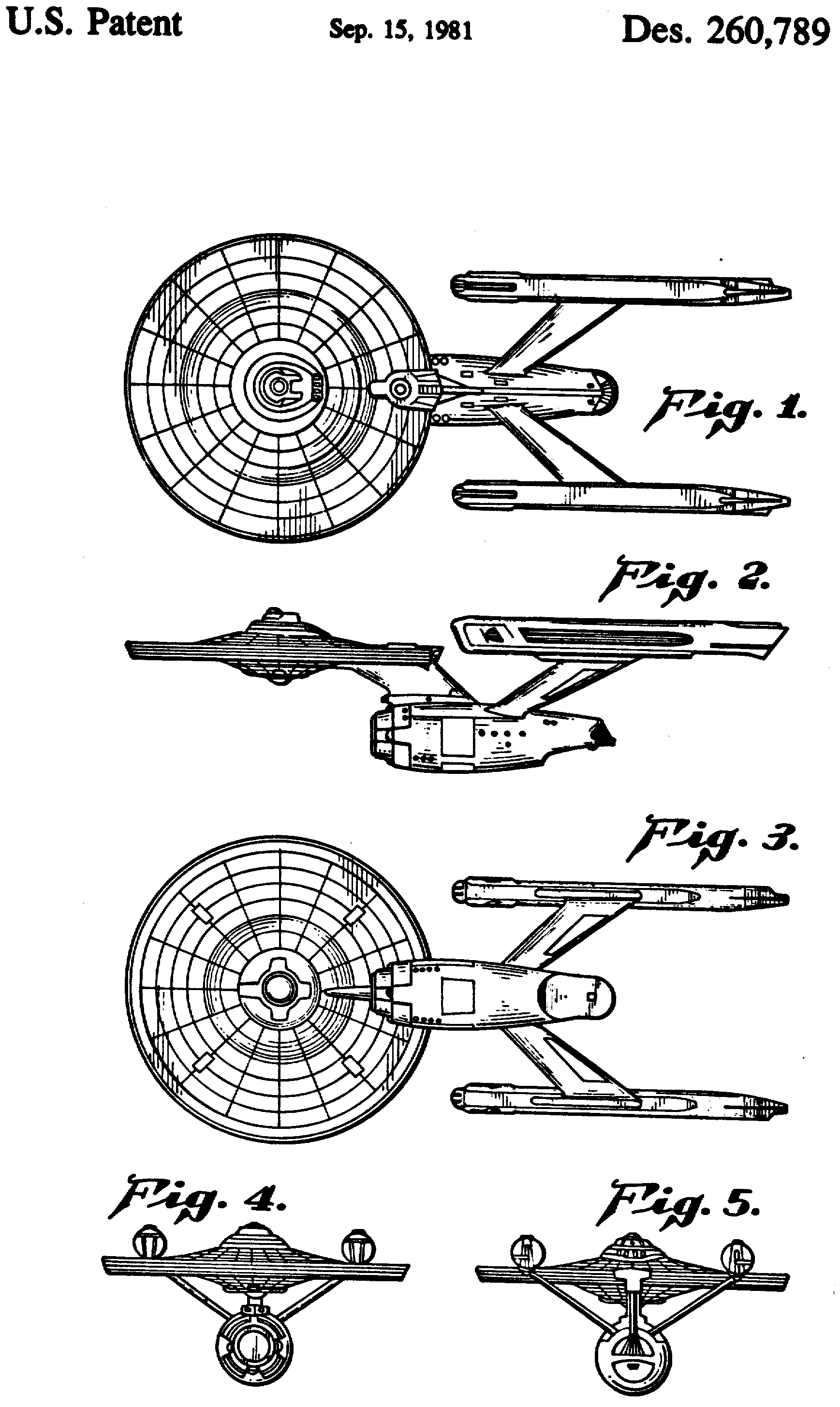
Andrew Probert submitted this art to the United States Patent and Trademark Office for a "toy spaceship" in the likeness of the redesigned Enterprise in 1979. Probert was granted the patent in 1981.

Soon after the animated Star Trek went off the air, pre-production began on Star Trek: Planet of the Titans. Ken Adam and Ralph McQuarrie designed a new Enterprise with a triangular hull that later inspired the appearance of the eponymous ship in Star Trek: Discovery. Planet of the Titans was dropped in favor of a return to television with Star Trek: Phase II, for which Jefferies designed a new Enterprise. He began with the original design and identified components, such as the engines, that would have been upgraded. Some elements, like the sensor dish, would move inside the ship to be more easily serviced. Abandoning Phase II in favor of producing Star Trek: The Motion Picture (1979) necessitated additional Enterprise redesigns because the film medium would resolve more detail than television, and one of the most difficult challenges facing the producers was recreating the Enterprise. Roddenberry told Cinefantastique that the changes to the Enterprise would be explained within the story as the outcome of a major refit.

When Jefferies left the project, art director Richard Taylor wanted to start over with designing the Enterprise; however, Roddenberry convinced him to continue working with Jefferies' design. Taylor brought on Andrew Probert to help refine the ship's details. Probert added items such as phaser banks, control thrusters, and hatches for saucer section landing gear; Taylor redesigned the edge of the saucer and elements of the warp nacelles. Art director Joe Jennings and conceptual illustrator Mike Minor added additional details. David Kimble created diagrams and deck plans for the updated Enterprise that were provided to model makers, toy companies, and other licensed product manufacturers.

The Enterprise (right) and Reliant approach each other in Star Trek II: The Wrath of Khan (1982). Though the Enterprise was heavily redesigned for film, it retains the same basic components from its television appearance. In designing the Reliant, Joe Jennings and Mike Minor rearranged those components to establish its connection to the Star Trek universe while distinguishing it from the Enterprise.

Jim Dow was in charge of building the model. Paramount Pictures subsidiary Magicam spent 14 months and $150,000 building the 8-foot (2.4 m), 39-kilogram (86 lb) model. An arc-welded aluminum skeleton ensured parts of the ship would not sag, bend, or shake. While the original Enterprise model was seen in only 17 poses, the new model had five articulation points and could be shot from any angle. Paul Olsen painted the "Aztec" hull pattern to provide an additional level of detail and to suggest the presence of interlocking panels providing strength. The effect was made possible by small particles of mica in the paint, which altered its apparent color. However, the paint created light flare that made it hard to discern the edge of the ship against a dark background, and bluescreen light reflected by the pearlescent paint also complicated filming. Effects supervisor Douglas Trumbull relit the ship as if it were an ocean liner, "a grand lady of the seas at night", because there would be no external light source in deep space. A 20-inch (51 cm) model was used for long shots.

Production designer Harold Michelson was responsible for the ship's interior design. The Enterprise interiors were designed to be distinct from the film's Klingon ship, and certain support structure designs were used throughout the Enterprise sets to convey a shared motif. A new bridge had been designed and partially built for Phase II, and Michelson largely retained the design and its consoles. The weapons console was rotated 90 degrees to break the monotony of stations facing the wall. Designer Lee Cole brought logic and function to the console designs, though Michelson wanted to remain focused on "drama, spectacle and beauty" over accuracy and logic. Rear projection films for bridge displays came initially from Stowmar Enterprises. When production exhausted the films faster than Stowmar could supply them, production designers manufactured their own from oscilloscopes, medical imagery, and an experimental computer lab.

Set designer Lewis Splittgerber described the engine room set as the most difficult to realize. Through forced perspective and small actors, the 40-foot (12 m) set was depicted as a 100-foot (30 m) engineering space. Corridors were initially a straight-wall design similar to the television series, and Michelson changed them to an angular design with light radiating upward. Director Robert Wise wanted the corridors to be narrower than on the television series, and mirrors gave the impression that they were longer than they actually were. Wise was also responsible for the ship's drab interior color scheme: the muted colors were meant to be comfortable across a five-year journey. The 2001 director's cut replaced several bridge computer voices with human voices to "warm up" the film.

=== Sequel film adjustments, destruction, and return ===
The Enterprise model was slightly refurbished for Star Trek II: The Wrath of Khan (1982), with its exterior shine dulled and extra detail added to the frame. Industrial Light & Magic (ILM) staff found the Enterprise difficult to work with: it took eight people to mount the model and a forklift to move it. Illustrator Mike Minor described the ship as a "sculpture" with an "aerodynamic shape," requiring careful filming so that its movements did not appear "silly". ILM developed several techniques to depict battle damage to the Enterprise without actually harming the model.

The smaller Wrath of Khan budget required the reuse of existing sets, but they presented challenges in realizing director Nicholas Meyer's desire for a "livelier" tone. The Enterprise was given a ship's bell, boatswain's call, and more blinking lights and signage to match the nautical atmosphere Meyer wanted to convey. Rear-projection systems for bridge displays were replaced with monitors looping taped material created by graphic designer Lee Cole at the Jet Propulsion Laboratory. The bridge set was "unbuttoned" so segments could be removed to better accommodate filming more dynamic action, though filming on the 360-degree set was still challenging. Further complicating the set was that it served three roles in the film: the Enterprise bridge, the Reliant bridge, and the Starfleet Academy bridge simulator. The production crew made several "plugs" to cover consoles and alcoves, and pyrotechnics could destroy the plugs during combat sequences without damaging the underlying set. Kirk's quarters were redressed with more personal items and a more naval appearance, and the same set depicted Spock's more "monastic" quarters. The torpedo bay set is a redress of the Klingon bridge from The Motion Picture, and David Kimble's deck plans from The Motion Picture influenced how previously unseen interior arrangements like the torpedo bay were depicted in The Wrath of Khan.

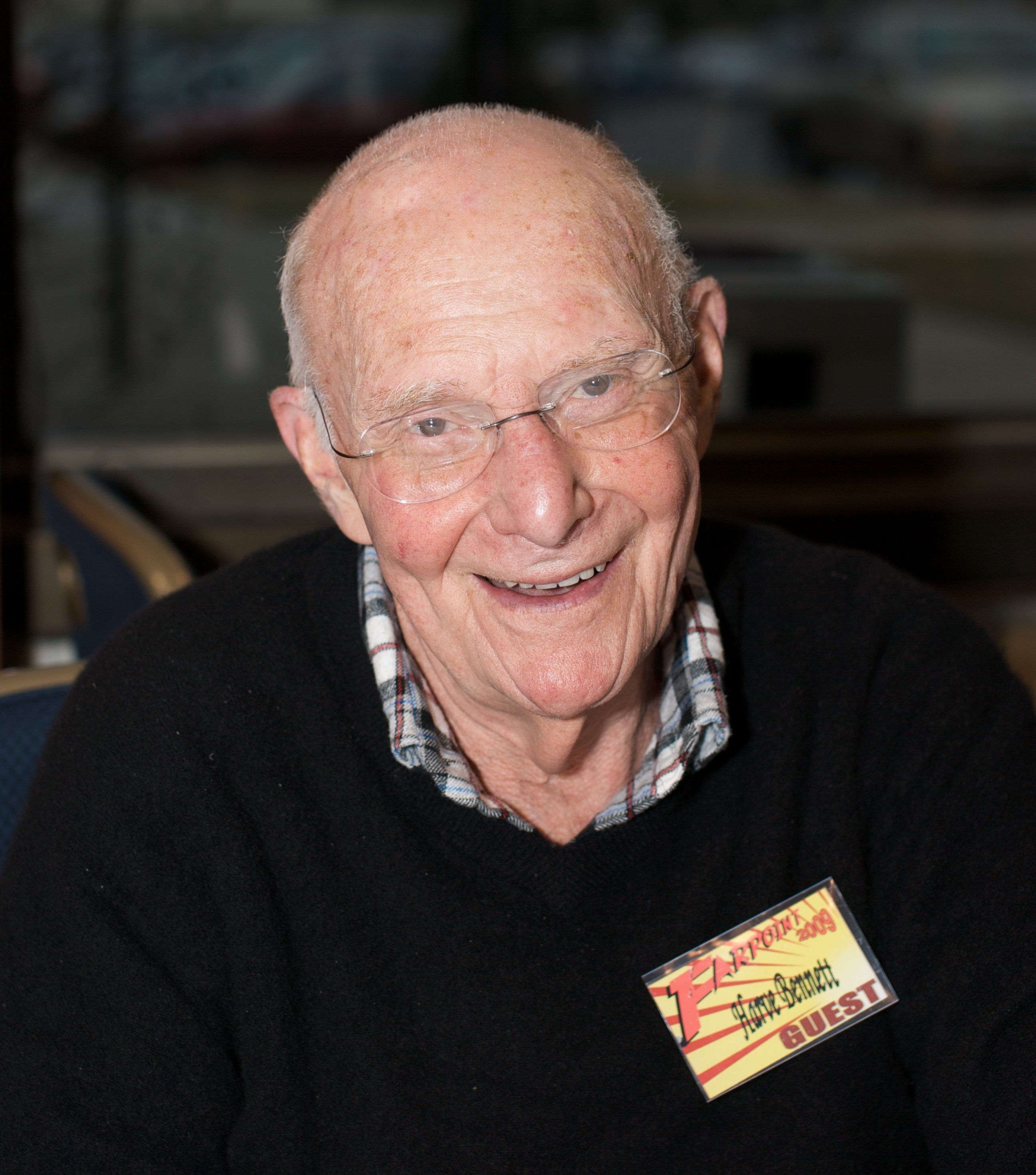
Producer Harve Bennett decided to destroy the Enterprise in Star Trek III: The Search for Spock (1984) because the story was otherwise predictable.

Recognizing the plot of Star Trek III: The Search for Spock (1984) was otherwise predictable, producer and screenwriter Harve Bennett decided to have the Enterprise destroyed. News of the ship's demise leaked despite Bennett's insistence that it be kept secret. Visual effects supervisor Ken Ralston hated the Enterprise model and reveled in its destruction. Rather than damage the large and expensive model, several less expensive miniatures and modules were created and destroyed. One of the destroyed models had been created by Brick Price Movie Miniatures for Star Trek Phase II.

Ralston hoped the ship's destruction would lead to a redesigned ship for future sequels, but the producers of Star Trek IV: The Voyage Home (1986) decided to have the crew assigned to a new Enterprise that is virtually identical to the previous ship. It took ILM more than six weeks to restore and repaint the original model to appear as the new USS Enterprise, NCC-1701-A. After visiting ILM, Majel Barrett described the model as "gorgeous," and she said some of its details – such as the windows into the arboretum – were not done justice by photographs. The existing bridge set was refurbished and repainted to serve as the Enterprise-A bridge at the end of The Voyage Home, and the set's sleek "Okudagrams" designed by scenic artist Michael Okuda were adopted in subsequent productions. A new $250,000 bridge set was built for Star Trek V: The Final Frontier (1989). Director Nicholas Meyer wanted the Enterprise to feel grittier and more realistic for Star Trek VI: The Undiscovered Country (1991), but realizing that vision was limited by the need to use existing sets. Cinematographer Hiro Narita changed the clean, bright look of the bridge from The Final Frontier by lighting it differently in The Undiscovered Country.

Several Enterprise film sets were redressed for Star Trek: The Next Generation (1987–1994); likewise, some Next Generation sets were used to depict interiors of the Enterprise-A. For example, Kirk's quarters in The Motion Picture were redressed as Data's quarters in The Next Generation, and the set then served as Kirk's and Spock's quarters in The Undiscovered Country.

=== Spinoff appearances and computer-generated models ===
Producers working on the Star Trek: The Next Generation episode "Relics" (1992), in which Montgomery Scott visits a recreation of the Enterprise, initially planned to use the film-era set. Ultimately, recreations of the original television series' captain's chair, navigation console, and engineering console were rented from fans, and the rest was filled in with archival footage and greenscreen technology. The bridge was again partially recreated, with other parts added digitally, for the Deep Space Nine episode "Trials and Tribble-ations" (1996), in which the crew visits the Enterprise during the events of "The Trouble With Tribbles" (1967). Okuda used a computer to recreate the graphics seen on the Enterprise sets, and others were drawn by artist Doug Drexler. Set designer Laura Richarz's biggest challenge was finding Burke chairs to populate the ship: she found just one, and the production team make molds to create more.

"Trials and Tribble-ations" also required exterior shots of the Enterprise. Greg Jein created an Enterprise model exactly half the size of the 11-foot original, and it was the first production model of the starship to be built in more than 30 years. Although the eight-foot film model's original pearlescent paint had been covered and it was redressed as the Enterprise-A, it was used as a reference for the CGI Enterprise created for the 2001 director's cut of The Motion Picture. A CGI Enterprise makes a cameo appearance at the end of the Star Trek: Enterprise series finale, "These Are the Voyages..." (2005). Artists creating a CGI Enterprise for the remastered original series had to ensure the model was not so detailed that it was incongruous with the overall 1960s production.

=== 2009 film franchise reboot ===
The re-conceptualized "alternate universe" USS Enterprise from the 2009 Star Trek film has the same core design as Matt Jefferies' original. It also includes elements from previous films, such as the "Aztec" paint scheme. The enlarged engine nacelles emphasize director J. J. Abrams's desire for the Enterprise to feel like a "hot rod".

The Enterprise was redesigned for the 2009 Star Trek film. Previsualization lead David Dozoretz credits the designers for overcoming the challenge of doing "a 2009 version of the '60s". Director J. J. Abrams wanted Enterprise to have a "hot rod" look while retaining the traditional shape, and he otherwise gave designers leeway. The designers wanted the Enterprise to appear as carefully crafted as a luxury car. Concept artist Ryan Church retained much of the original Enterprise design and focused on the functionality behind the familiar components. His initial designs were modeled and refined by set designer Joseph Hiura. This design was then given to ILM for further refinement and developed into photo-realistic models by Alex Jaeger's team. ILM's Roger Guyett, recalling the original Enterprise as being "very static", added moving parts. ILM retained subtle geometric forms and patterns to allude to the original Enterprise, and the model's digital paint recreated the "Aztec" hull pattern from the first films. The large engine nacelles had a sleeker finish and shape compared to the original ship's otherwise simple nacelles. Sean Hargreaves' redesign of the successor NCC-1701-A "beef[ed] up" the vessel's support pylons, which are depicted as vulnerabilities in Star Trek Beyond (2016).

According to Abrams, recreating the original bridge would have been ridiculous and too small. Abrams' enthusiasm for a new iPhone influenced Church's bridge redesign. Sophisticated technology became a motif on the new set, with multiple displays and computer graphics. The viewscreen from the television series was kept, and giving different characters their own computer displays suggested the idea of a team working together. Because the original series transporter room seemed flat to Abrams, he used swirling light and camera movement to make the new set and effects more dynamic. The budget prevented the creation of a huge, functional engineering room set, and producers instead filmed at a Budweiser plant. Ben Burtt consulted with original series sound designer Douglas Grindstaff on sound design for the new Enterprise.

=== Redesign for streaming series ===
==== Discovery ====
The Enterprise appears briefly at the end of Star Trek: Discovery's first-season finale (2018) and occasionally during the show's second season (2019). John Eaves, Scott Schneider, and William Budge redesigned the Enterprise for Discovery, which occurs about a decade before the original Star Trek. The designers usually had only a few weeks to design a vessel, but they worked on Enterprise from April to October 2017. Other than a few small notes, they were given no explicit direction about the ship's appearance; Schneider called the redesign project the trio's "golden hour".

They considered but quickly rejected a design significantly different from Jefferies' original. Eaves created 10 relatively similar sketches that streamlined the original Enterprise to appear more consistent with Discovery's sleek aesthetic, and the team selected one to refine. They developed the vessel with the assumption that components like the warp nacelles and impulse engines would be replaced over time; the modules for the Enterprise's appearance in Discovery are meant to appear more primitive than what is depicted in Star Trek. The designers tried to incorporate elements from other ships that precede and succeed the Enterprise, such as the 21st-century Phoenix in Star Trek: First Contact (1996), the 22nd-century Enterprise in Star Trek: Enterprise (2001–2005), and the USS Enterprise-B in Star Trek Generations (1994). They also included elements from the Enterprise refit for The Motion Picture. One distinct challenge was the hull: Jefferies' design featured a smooth hull, but the lack of features would appear too simple on modern high-definition displays. The designers added details, such as phaser banks and control thrusters, that "must have been there" on the original Enterprise but were not depicted on the Star Trek models. The ship's scale also fluctuated, which meant the designers had to adjust window sizes and patterns.

Budge kept the designers in check by ensuring details and features added to the Enterprise were consistent with other Discovery ships, such as whether the bridge would have a window: most Discovery ship bridges have a front-facing window, but the Enterprise had never been depicted with one. The solution was to depict the Enterprise bridge as having a large piece of transparent aluminum at its front that can become either transparent or opaque. Eaves sent the design team's model to the visual effects team, which made further design changes. Discovery producer Gretchen J. Berg said she hoped fans see the Enterprise's appearance in Discovery as a blend of old and new Star Trek. Another Discovery producer, Aaron Harberts, wasn't worried whether fans were satisfied with the ship's redesign: while many of the staff who developed the new appearance were Star Trek fans, Harberts said fans rarely agree on anything.

The Enterprise bridge appears in the second season's finale. Production designer Tamara Deverell and her team wanted to honor the original bridge but needed to create the set using current techniques and to meet modern audience expectations. The production's widescreen format, as opposed to the original series' 4:3 aspect ratio, required the set design to be more "stretched out" horizontally; designers referenced Star Trek film bridges – also recorded in widescreen – to assist with designing for the different ratio. The bridge was a fully constructed set, save for greenscreen for the main viewer. The set maintained the original's layout and included references and details from Star Trek, such as Sulu's and Spock's console scanners, red bridge railings, and turbolift handles. They also created new elements, such as a corridor running behind the bridge. According to Deverell, the hardest part of designing the bridge was choosing the color palette. The bridge chairs were nearly identical to those used in Star Trek, and the captain's chair was heavily influenced by Captain Kirk's original. A fan-created replica of the original bridge – later opened as museum – sent the production team hundreds of buttons for the set's consoles.

==== Strange New Worlds ====
Enterprise is the main setting of Star Trek: Strange New Worlds (2022–present), which depicts the ship led by Captain Christopher Pike. Anson Mount, who plays Pike, said Strange New Worlds has a "big idea of the week" like the original Star Trek, and as such the Enterprise is "the star of the show". Rebecca Romijn, who plays first officer Una Chin-Riley, called the Enterprise "sexy, and groovy, and fun." According to producer Akiva Goldsman, the show's designers "tried to evoke the experience of watching [the original Star Trek], but with the grammar available to us today." Goldsman describes the ship as aspirational and meant to pull audiences into an imagined future.

The Enterprise in Strange New Worlds differs slightly from its Discovery appearance. The bridge set for Strange New Worlds was more compact than the one built for Discovery to bring it closer to the size of the original series set. The sets were designed to function like a practical starship, with moving components and pre-programmed monitor graphics that reacted to the actors. While the viewscreen was a visual effect in Discovery, it was physically built into the Strange New Worlds set. Sickbay was an entirely new design, meant to convey a large scale and capable of accommodating many camera movements. Designers relied on a massive augmented reality LED volume to depict the scale of main engineering. Due to the COVID-19 pandemic, some sets were not complete when filming began. Goldsman said they were "building the Enterprise around shooting on the Enterprise." Production designers also changed the color scheme, "warming" it from its Discovery palette. A specific shade of red is used as a secondary color throughout the ship, complementing warm and cold off-whites.

== Fictional history ==
Starfleet commissioned the Enterprise in 2245. Robert April is the Enterprise's first captain, succeeded by Christopher Pike. Pike leads the Enterprise for approximately a decade, and he is the commanding officer in the original Star Trek pilot, the second season of Star Trek: Discovery, and Star Trek: Strange New Worlds. Throughout the first live action and animated Star Trek television series, Captain James T. Kirk commands the ship and its 430-person crew on an exploration mission from 2264 to 2269. Star Trek: The Motion Picture takes place in the 2270's as the Enterprise is completing an 18-month refit overseen by its new captain, Willard Decker. Decker describes the refit vessel as "an almost totally new Enterprise" when Admiral Kirk takes command to address a threat to Earth. Star Trek novels and other media depict a second five-year mission under Kirk's command between the events of the first and second films.

Captain Spock commands the Enterprise, serving as a training ship, at the beginning of Star Trek II: The Wrath of Khan in 2285. Kirk assumes command to investigate problems at space station Regula 1. The USS Reliant, hijacked by Khan Noonien Singh, seriously damages the Enterprise; Spock sacrifices his life to save the ship. Starfleet decides to decommission the damaged Enterprise at the beginning of Star Trek III: The Search for Spock, and Kirk and his senior officers steal the ship as part of their plan to restore Spock's life. During their mission, a Klingon attack disables the Enterprise. Kirk lures most of the Klingons onto the immobilized vessel, which he and his officers set to self-destruct before abandoning ship.

When Kirk and his officers return to Earth in Star Trek IV: The Voyage Home, Kirk is demoted to captain and given command of a new USS Enterprise, with the registry NCC-1701-A. Various licensed materials describe the ship's history before its commissioning as Enterprise, such as it being re-named from USS Yorktown, USS Ti-Ho, or USS Atlantis. Spock's half-brother Sybok hijacks the Enterprise-A and takes it to the center of the galaxy in Star Trek V: The Final Frontier. In Star Trek VI: The Undiscovered Country, Enterprise thwarts the renegade Klingon General Chang's attempt to disrupt a peace summit. At the film's conclusion, Enterprise is ordered to report to spacedock to be decommissioned. The Enterprise-A is part of the Fleet Museum in Star Trek: Picard's third season (2023).

=== Reboot film series ===
The 2009 reboot film Star Trek and its sequels occur in a different timeline than the original Star Trek. The Enterprise first appears while under construction in Riverside, Iowa, in 2255. Captain Christopher Pike commands Enterprise on its 2258 maiden voyage to respond to a Vulcan distress call. At the film's conclusion, James Kirk is promoted to captain and receives command of the Enterprise. The vessel is destroyed in Star Trek Beyond and a new Enterprise, NCC-1701-A, is commissioned under Kirk's command.

== Critical reaction ==
=== Original appearance ===
Like other Star Trek ships with the same name, the original Enterprise is "a character in its own right," and the ship "was just as important ... as Kirk, Spock, and McCoy". Rod Roddenberry called the ship Star Trek's first character and its creation "the birth of Star Trek". According to film critic Scott Jordan Harris, the Enterprise was the franchise's most important character, pointing out:

Crucially, the famous words that begin each episode of the TV show, and that recur in the films, are not "These are the voyages of Captain Kirk ..." or "These are the voyages of Starfleet ..." They are "These are the voyages of the Starship Enterprise ..."

Writing in the Journal of Popular Film & Television, National Air and Space Museum curator Margaret Weitekamp identifies two distinct celebrity Enterprises: the fictional starship Enterprise as a character or popular culture icon, and the actual physical objects (for example, the filming models) as an iconic design. According to Weitekamp, "The two Enterprises overlap, and are clearly related, but they do not map completely onto each other," and unpacking distinctions between them contributes to scholarly analysis of popular and material culture and of "this significant television artifact".

The Enterprise's design, which influenced future starships in the franchise, is iconic. The design came at the end of a trend for science-fiction spaceships to resemble rockets, and just as real spacecraft began to influence sci-fi designs. When it first appeared on television, the Enterprise was called an "elegant and weird looking behemoth". Design expert Jonathan Glancey described the "convincing and exciting" Enterprise as having the same aesthetic appeal as the Concorde jet, B-17 bomber, and Queen Elizabeth 2 ocean liner. The interiors are also exemplars of 1960s design. Popular Mechanics said the original Enterprise has the best design of the franchise's various ships named Enterprise. io9 ranked the original design as the best version of the Enterprise, characterizing the original as superior to ten later versions of its namesake.

=== Film redesign and destruction ===
Harris included the Enterprise as one of the 50 most significant objects to appear in film, alongside the ruby slippers in The Wizard of Oz, the Maschinenmensch in Metropolis, and the Batmobile in Batman Begins. Time called the ship's redesign for The Motion Picture "bold" and "handsome". Conversely, Harlan Ellison called the Enterprise a "jalopy" in The Motion Picture, and The Washington Post said the Enterprise looked "like a toy boat in a lava lamp" in The Wrath of Khan. Entertainment Weekly wrote that, after being depicted as a complicated vessel requiring detailed care in The Wrath of Khan, it seemed "a bit loony" for the Enterprise to be operable by just a handful of officers in Star Trek III: The Search for Spock. Jill Sherwin suggested that the aging Enterprise in The Search for Spock served as a metaphor for the aging Star Trek franchise. io9 ranked the film appearance as the second-best design of an Enterprise.

The destruction of the Enterprise in Star Trek III: The Search for Spock has been described as "truly iconic" and "a good way to go", though David Gerrold wrote that it "casts a pall" over The Search for Spock that even Spock's resurrection does not displace. In her biography of DeForest Kelley, Terry Lee Rioux calls the Enterprise a "mother goddess" who, consistent with "one of the oldest and highest myths" in humanity, sacrifices herself so her children, the crew, can live on. David C. Fein, who produced the director's cut of The Motion Picture, described the Enterprise as Kirk's lover, and said destroying the ship meant Kirk "killed the woman that he loves more than any existing being in the world." Popular Mechanics ranked the ship's destruction the 32nd greatest scene in science fiction.

=== Spin-off television appearances ===
The New York Times called it "a joy" to see the original Enterprise as redesigned for Discovery's second-season premiere. Engadget called the Enterprise in Strange New Worlds "gorgeous inside and out." Writing for Tor.com, Keith DeCandido praised Strange New Worlds' producers for balancing the Enterprise's original 1960s look with what audiences expect from modern productions. TrekCore said Strange New Worlds' set dressing and use show the Enterprise "as both a character unto herself and as a mirror reflecting the people who inhabit her."

== Impact ==
=== Within the franchise ===
The original Enterprise and 1979 film designs have affected subsequent Star Trek productions. The USS Excelsior in Star Trek III is meant to make the Enterprise "look old and out of date". Model maker Bill George tried to imagine what the Enterprise would look like if it were designed by the Japanese, and he used that impression as the basis for his refinement of the Excelsior model. Andrew Probert returned to Star Trek to design a new USS Enterprise, NCC-1701-D, for Star Trek: The Next Generation (1987–1994), which takes place 100 years after the original Star Trek. The Enterprise-D retains the hallmarks of Matt Jefferies' Enterprise design: a saucer section, engineering section, and a pair of engine nacelles. Probert did this in part to assuage skeptical fans who were concerned about the original Enterprise being "replaced". Much of Probert's design is based on a "what if?" painting he made after finalizing the 1979 film Enterprise design. The USS Titan in Star Trek: Picard's third season draws inspiration from the film redesign, which producer Terry Matalas called "the best starship design ever made.

=== Broader culture ===
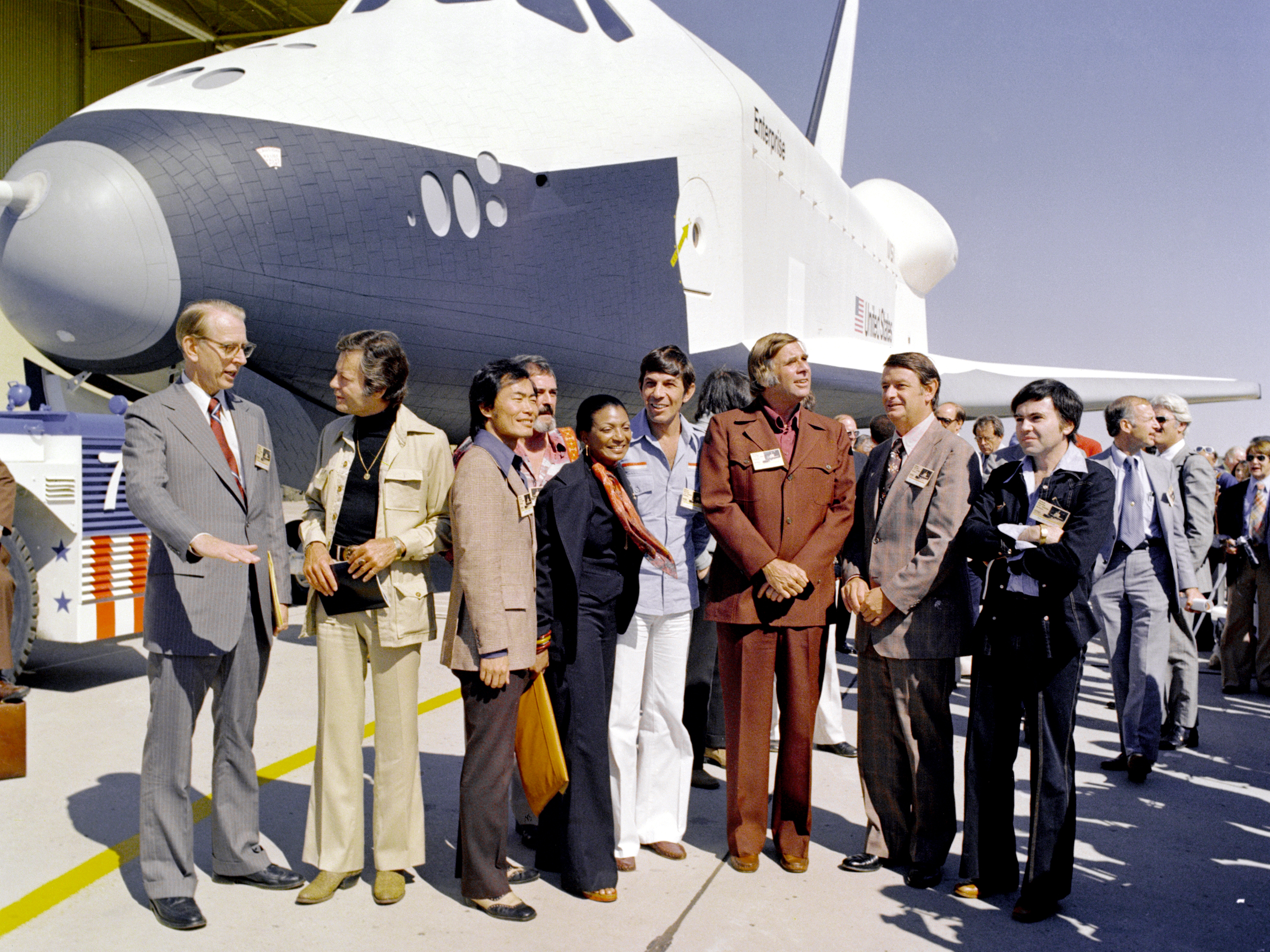
Star Trek creator Gene Roddenberry (third from right, in dark brown), the Star Trek cast (with the exception of William Shatner), and NASA administrators attended the Space Shuttle Enterprise's rollout ceremony on September 17, 1976. A letter-writing campaign convinced NASA to name the shuttle Enterprise in honor of the television vessel.

The starship Enterprise has had considerable cultural impact, and the original ship's model is "a living cultural object". Bjo Trimble said the original Star Trek received more fan letters about the Enterprise than any of the actors. According to film critic Scott Jordan Harris, although the contemporaneous Apollo program prompted intellectual awareness of the possibilities of space travel, it was the Enterprise of the 1960s that sparked space travel fantasies. A 1976 write-in campaign led to the first Space Shuttle being named Enterprise rather than Constitution. In 2009, Virgin Galactic named its first commercial spaceship VSS Enterprise to honor the Star Trek vessel. The United States Navy evaluated the efficiency of the Enterprise bridge's style and layout, and the USS Independence's bridge and USS Zumwalt's Ship's Mission Center have been compared to the Enterprise bridge. An Enterprise bridge replica created for a Star Trek fan series was later opened as a public exhibit. The distinct beeps emitted by R2-D2 in Star Wars are "an offspring" of the melodic sounds created for the Enterprise's bridge console. Vulcan, Alberta, created a 31-foot (9.4 m) model starship inspired by the Enterprise.

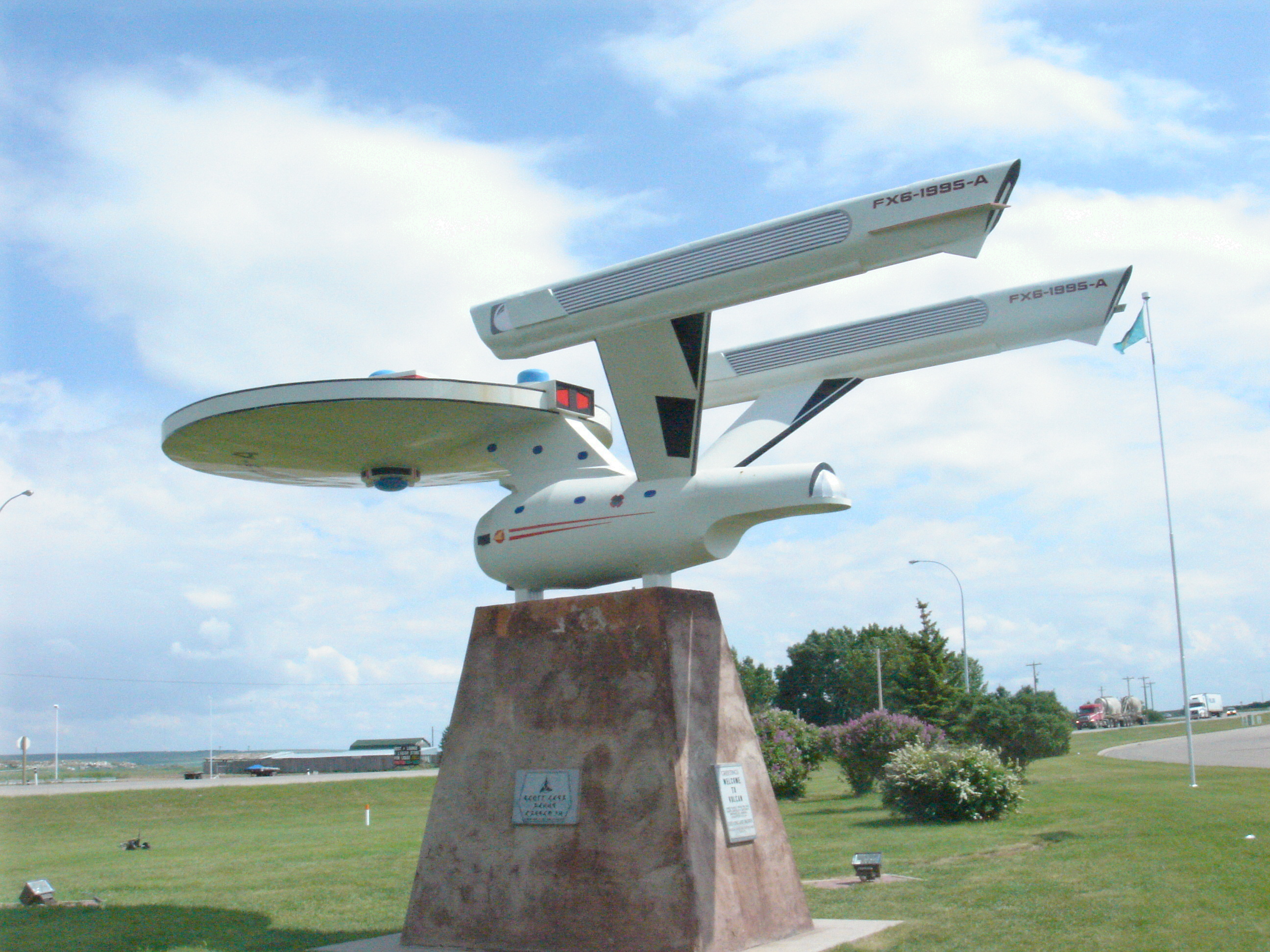
The visitor center in Vulcan, Alberta, features a replica starship Enterprise.

The Enterprise design has been licensed for use in variety of games, models, and toys. AMT's 1966 Enterprise model is one of the company's highest-selling kits: one million kits sold during the show's first year of production; the previous bestseller, a car from The Munsters, took two years to reach one million sales. Ballantine Books released a set of Enterprise blueprints in April 1975, and by December 1976 they were in their seventh printing. The first run of a cutaway drawing of the Enterprise for The Motion Picture sold over one million prints. In 2010, Simon & Schuster's Gallery Books published a Haynes Manual for "owners" of the USS Enterprise. The United States Postal Service has released several USS Enterprise stamps. Pulitzer Prize–winning editorial cartoonist Mike Luckovich has used the Enterprise as the setting for two of his illustrations for The Atlanta Journal-Constitution.

=== Production models and props ===
The three-foot model was loaned out during the production of The Motion Picture and lost until 2024. In 2026, Rod Roddenberry announced that the original model was in the Roddenberry family's possession. The model required restoration due to damage and previous possessors applying additional glue and paint.

Paramount Pictures donated the 11-foot model to the Smithsonian Institution in 1974, disassembled across three crates and dirty. In shipping the model, Paramount estimated the value of the model at $5,000. Starting in 1976, it hung at an exhibit gallery entrance at the National Air and Space Museum before being moved to the gift shop, where it stayed for 14 years. In the first of its initial restorations, the model was altered to look more like the starship Enterprise and less like a studio filming model. The model underwent restorations in 1974, 1984, 1992, and 2016. For much of its time on display, fans have been surprised at the differences between the model and their expectations about how the "real" spacecraft should appear. A substantial, multi-year restoration culminated in 2016 with the unveiling of a new display in the Milestones of Flight Hall. This restoration highlighted the duality of the Enterprise as both a filming model and inspirational starship.

The original captain's chair prop sold at auction for $304,750. In 2006, Paul Allen bought the Enterprise model created for the original Star Trek films for $240,000; it is on display at the Museum of Pop Culture. Another model of the film version is on display at aerospace company Blue Origin.
