= Time Squared (Star Trek: The Next Generation) =

- Star Trek: The Next Generation episode
- Episode no.: Season 2 Episode 13
- Directed by: Joseph L. Scanlan
- Story by: Kurt Michael Bensmiller
- Teleplay by: Maurice Hurley
- Cinematography by: Edward R. Brown
- Production code: 139
- Original air date: April 3, 1989

Guest appearance
- Colm Meaney as Miles O'Brien

Episode chronology
| ← Previous "The Royale" | Next → "The Icarus Factor" |
- Star Trek: The Next Generation season 2

"Time Squared" is the thirteenth episode of the second season of the American science fiction television series Star Trek: The Next Generation, the 39th episode overall. It originally aired on April 3, 1989, in broadcast syndication. The episode was written by Maurice Hurley from a story by Kurt Michael Bensmiller and directed by Joseph L. Scanlan.

Set in the 24th century, the series follows the adventures of the Starfleet crew of the Federation starship Enterprise-D. In this episode, the crew of the Enterprise encounter a double of Captain Picard, apparently from the future.

== Plot ==
While the Federation starship Enterprise is en route to their planned destination, ship's sensors detect a lone shuttlepod drifting through empty space with no power or fuel reserves. When Lt. Worf and Commander Riker use the tractor beam to bring it into the shuttlebay, they find it has the same name and registry as an Enterprise shuttle. Inside is a double of Captain Picard, barely clinging to life. After the double is brought to sickbay for treatment, Lt. Commander Data and Chief Engineer La Forge discover that the shuttle's internal clock is about six hours ahead of the ship's chronometer which means that the shuttle, and therefore Picard's double, is from six hours into the future. They recover a very poor quality sensor log video that shows the Enterprise falling into an energy vortex and being destroyed after the shuttle is launched.

Chief Medical Officer Dr. Pulaski determines that the incoherent double's biological functions are out of sync, but are improving as the future Picard draws nearer to his own time. Picard orders that his future self be revived, but is unsuccessful in extracting any information from him. Picard is disquieted at the idea that he would abandon his ship and its crew. The crew members decide to continue on their current course. They are suddenly stopped by the vortex seen in the shuttle log and are unable to escape. Scans emanating from the vortex appear to focus on Picard and an energy beam strikes him leading him to theorize that there is an intelligence controlling the vortex which seems to be interested in him personally, and that his double left the ship to draw its attention.

Picard's double, now almost completely aware and coherent, sets out to leave the Enterprise as he did before. Picard follows him, asserting that there must have been another option. As the double is boarding the shuttlepod, Picard proclaims that the cycle will be broken and kills him with a phaser. Picard returns to the bridge and orders that the Enterprise fly straight into the center of the vortex. The Enterprise comes through the other side into normal space, and the doubles of Picard and the shuttlepod disappear. The Enterprise resumes its course.

== Production ==
Maurice Hurley, who wrote the teleplay, wanted to write a time travel story that took place over only six hours, instead of the longer periods usually found. The story was originally meant to feature Q as the ultimate antagonist, but Gene Roddenberry disallowed it. The name of the shuttlepod, a lower budget alternative to the shuttlecraft, was named for Farouk El-Baz, a NASA scientist.

== Reception ==
Zack Handlen of The A.V. Club rated the episode A− and wrote that the episode has "a few dull pockets", but "the final scenes between the two Picards rank among my favorites of anything we've yet seen on the show", further explaining that "this is the first time we've really seen how far [Picard will] go to do what's necessary." Tor.com rated it 2 out of 10.

== Cultural impact ==
The first track of British electronic duo Orbital's 1991 self-titled debut studio album opens with a sample of Lt. Worf's line, "There is the theory of the Möbius — a twist in the fabric of space where time becomes a loop." Other lines from the episode, such as Geordie La Forge's, "When you reach that point, whatever happened will happen again." are sampled throughout the song.
