= John Eaves =

- Born: April 9, 1962 (age 64)
- Occupations: Illustrator and model maker
- Known for: Star Trek designs
- Notable work: USS Enterprise-E
- Website: johneaves.wordpress.com

John Eaves (born April 9, 1962) is a designer and illustrator best known for his work on the Star Trek franchise, starting with Star Trek V: The Final Frontier. He served as a production illustrator on Star Trek: Deep Space Nine and Star Trek: Enterprise and was involved in all four Next Generation movies, specifically being responsible for the design of the Sovereign-class Enterprise-E. He also worked on a variety of films, such as Top Gun, Terminator 2: Judgment Day, Valkyrie and G.I. Joe: The Rise of Cobra.

== Career ==
The first film Eaves worked on was Top Gun as a model maker. These included the F-14 Tomcat and Northrop F-5 models which were used for the special effects shots of the aircraft. Prior to his work on the film, he had been working as a produce clerk at Bayless Markets. Eaves also worked as a model maker on a variety of other films, including Spaceballs and Terminator 2: Judgment Day. He also worked on the television series SeaQuest DSV. His first work on the Star Trek franchise was on Star Trek V: The Final Frontier whilst working at Greg Jein's model shop in Marina del Rey, California. His first design was the wing cannon for the Klingon Bird of Prey.

Eaves was introduced to Herman Zimmerman through Eaves' friend Phil Edgerly. Zimmerman was looking for someone to put together a display of Enterprise, and Eaves drew up a plan for the display. Zimmerman was impressed by the artwork, and asked Eaves to join his design team for Star Trek Generations.

When a job became available on the Star Trek: Deep Space Nine art department during season four, Zimmerman invited Eaves to join the team. At the time, Eaves was working on a Boeing 747 model for the film Executive Decision. Eaves spent the next twelve years working on one incarnation of Star Trek or another. During this time, his work included the designs of the Phoenix, the Enterprise-E and the Vulcan ship from Star Trek: First Contact. The initial model of the Enterprise-E was constructed by Eaves.

His design work featured in the Deep Space Nine episode "Far Beyond the Stars", during the part of the episode set in the 1950s. After working on Star Trek: Insurrection, where his designs included the Son'a vessels, Zimmerman brought Eaves onto the team behind Star Trek: Enterprise as Production Illustrator. Whilst working on that series, he started work on the Enterprise (NX-01), as well as the Suliban vessels. His work on the final TNG film Star Trek: Nemesis included the design of the Reman starship, the Scimitar.

Eaves worked on the 2009 Star Trek film, and Star Trek: Discovery. He was involved with Perpetual Entertainment as a production consultant and illustrator on their now defunct MMOG, Star Trek Online, though many of his contributions remain intact within the version that was developed by Cryptic Studios. He also provided the designs of the spaceships for the science fiction themed social network MyOuterSpace. He was also in charge of art direction for Star Trek: Renegades, a fan produced pilot funded through Kickstarter and made by the creators of Star Trek: Of Gods and Men. He worked on several films as an illustrator following Star Trek, including Tropic Thunder, Valkyrie and G.I. Joe: The Rise of Cobra.

As of 2015, he is also a member of the board of advisers for the Hollywood Science Fiction Museum.
