= Ryan Church (concept artist) =

American concept designer

- Born: July 18, 1971 (age 55); Long Beach, California, U.S.
- Education: Art Center College of Design (B.S.) University of California, Los Angeles (B.A.)
- Occupations: Concept designer, industrial designer
- Years active: 1998 - present
- Website: www.ryanchurch.com

Ryan Church (born July 18, 1971 in Long Beach, California) is an American concept designer best known for his designs of vehicles, planets, and architectures as a concept design supervisor on George Lucas's Attack of the Clones, Revenge of the Sith, and of the tripods in Steven Spielberg's War of the Worlds.

He worked on James Cameron's Avatar (2009) and is responsible for the updated design of the USS Enterprise in J. J. Abrams's Star Trek films as well as the design of the Stealth Helicopters in Zero Dark Thirty (2012) and the Ship of the Imagination in Cosmos: A Spacetime Odyssey (2014) presented by Neil deGrasse Tyson.

Church returned to the Star Wars franchise in 2013 as a concept artist for The Force Awakens, Rogue One and The Rise of Skywalker. He is also a concept supervisor on the television series The Mandalorian, Obi-Wan Kenobi, and Ahsoka.

Church graduated with honors in Transportation Design with emphasis on Entertainment Design at Art Center College of Design in Pasadena, California.

== Filmography ==
- Star Wars: Episode II – Attack of the Clones (2002) (concept design supervisor)
- Star Wars: Episode III – Revenge of the Sith (2005) (concept design supervisor)
- War of the Worlds (2005) (creature designer)
- Transformers (2007) (concept artist)
- Outlander (2008) (concept artist)
- Star Trek (2009) (concept designer)
- Transformers: Revenge of the Fallen (2009) (concept artist)
- Avatar (2009) (concept artist)
- Super 8 (2011) (concept artist)
- Transformers: Dark of the Moon (2011) (concept artist)
- John Carter (2012) (concept artist)
- Zero Dark Thirty (2012) (concept designer)
- Star Trek Into Darkness (2013) (concept designer)
- Godzilla (2014) (concept artist)
- Cosmos: A Spacetime Odyssey (2014) (designer: Ship of the Imagination)
- Avengers: Age of Ultron (2015) (visual effects art director)
- Tomorrowland (2015) (concept artist)
- Star Wars: The Force Awakens (2015) (concept artist)
- Rogue One: A Star Wars Story (2016) (concept artist)
- Transformers: The Last Knight (2017) (visual effects art director)
- Ready Player One (2018) (illustrator)
- The Mandalorian (2019-2022) (concept supervisor)
- Star Wars: The Rise of Skywalker (2019) (concept artist)
- Cosmos: A Spacetime Odyssey (2020) (senior concept artist)
- The Book of Boba Fett (2021) (concept supervisor)
- Pinocchio (2022) (concept artist)
- The Lord of the Rings: The Rings of Power (2022) (concept artist)
- Obi-Wan Kenobi (2022) (concept design supervisor)
- Ahsoka (2023) (concept supervisor)

== Video games ==
- The Lord of the Rings: The Battle for Middle-Earth II (2006) (cinematic painter)
- Command & Conquer 3: Tiberium Wars (2007) (concept artist)
- Command & Conquer: Red Alert 3 (2008) (additional art)
- Dead Space (2008) (concept artist: art)
- Star Citizen (TBA): (concept artist)
