= Joseph R. Jennings =

American art director (1921–2015)

- Born: August 16, 1921; Jonesboro, Arkansas, U.S.
- Died: April 1, 2015 (aged 93); West Hills, Los Angeles, California, U.S.
- Occupation: Art director
- Years active: 1968–1992

Joseph Raleigh Jennings (August 16, 1921 – April 1, 2015) was an American art director.

== Professional career ==
He was nominated for an Academy Award for Best Art Direction for the film Star Trek: The Motion Picture.

== Death ==
Jennings died in West Hills, Los Angeles, California on April 1, 2015, at the age of 93. He was outlived by his wife, Jean, who died in 2018.

== Selected filmography ==
Year	Work	Role	Notes
1992	The Jacksons: An American Dream	Production Designer	TV Mini-Series (Final Credited Work)
1985	Space	Production Designer	TV Mini-Series
1984	Johnny Dangerously	Production Designer	
1983	Yellowbeard	Production Designer	
1982	Star Trek II: The Wrath of Khan	Production Designer	
1981	Evita Peron	Production Designer	TV Movie
1980	Shogun	Production Designer	TV Mini-Series
1979	Star Trek: The Motion Picture	Art Director	
1977	Roots	Art Director	TV Mini-Series
1967	Gunsmoke	Art Director	TV Series (150 episodes)

== Awards and nominations ==
Year	Award	Category	Nominated work	Results	Ref.
1979	Academy Awards	Best Art Direction	Star Trek: The Motion Picture	Nominated	
1977	Primetime Emmy Awards	Outstanding Art Direction or Scenic Design for a Drama Series	Roots	Nominated	
1981	Primetime Emmy Awards	Outstanding Art Direction for a Limited Series or a Special	Shōgun	Nominated	
