= Andrew Probert =

American artist (born 1946)

- Born: September 5, 1946 (age 79); Independence, Missouri, United States
- Other name: Andrew G. Probert
- Occupation: Concept designer

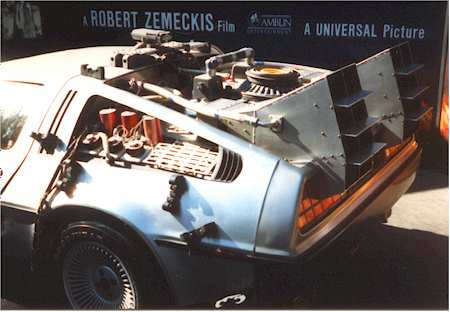
The modified De Lorean DMC-12 Probert helped design, which appeared in movie Back to the Future

Andrew Probert (born 1946 in Independence, Missouri) is an American artist. He is known for his work with the Star Trek franchise, most notably the designs of the USS Enterprise for Star Trek: The Motion Picture and the Enterprise-D for Star Trek: The Next Generation.

After spending some time in the United States Navy, Probert studied at the Art Center College of Design in Pasadena, California.

His first film/TV work was on Glen A. Larson's 1978 ABC miniseries Battlestar Galactica, for which he was recommended by artist Ralph McQuarrie. For Galactica, Andrew contributed the design for the Cylon Centurions.

In 1978, he was hired by Robert Abel and Associates to work on Star Trek: The Motion Picture, where he worked as a concept designer/illustrator. When Abel's group was replaced, Andrew survived the transition to the group of new effects supervisor Douglas Trumbull. Andrew was primarily responsible for designing the human and Vulcan space technology seen in the film, including the refitted starship Enterprise, Space Drydock, Orbital Office Complex, Travel Pod, Work Bee support vehicles, and the Vulcan long range shuttlecraft. His concept sketches for the bridge set of the Klingon battlecruiser set the style for all future Klingon ship interiors.

In 1983, Probert returned to television, working on the pilot episode of Airwolf (1984). He designed the external fuselage attachments for the Airwolf helicopter, based on a Bell 222, as well as both versions of the internal Electronic Data Command Center, the show's iconic logotype and wolf insignia, flight suit costumes and other miscellaneous items within Archangel's office. He also story-boarded most of the aerial sequences on the show for the 2nd Unit team during the series' run from 1984 to 1986.

In 1984, he worked on Back to the Future, initially drawing storyboards but then continuing the design of the DeLorean time machine that had been started by Ron Cobb.

Also in 1984, he designed the motorcycle for the pilot episode of Street Hawk, which was later redesigned for the series by Ron Cobb.

In 1986, he joined the staff of the then new series Star Trek: The Next Generation where he was initially hired to design the bridge of the new starship, the Enterprise-D. However, after the show's producers saw a speculative Enterprise sketch that Probert had produced he was tasked with designing the starship's exterior as well. During his one season stint on The Next Generation, he also designed the exteriors of virtually every other space vehicle seen in the first year of the show, including the Romulan Warbird.

His film and television work also includes stints on *batteries not included, SpaceCamp, Mask, Tron and The Philadelphia Experiment. He also worked four years as a Show Designer at Walt Disney Imagineering.

On February 6, 2006, Perpetual Entertainment and CBS Media announced that Probert had been employed as an initial design consultant for the first incarnation of the MMOG Star Trek Online.

In May 2013, Probert began communicating with Jamie Anderson, resulting in Conceptual Consulting on Anderson's first book project: GF-1, written by M.G. Harris, continuing into 2015.
