= Matt Jefferies =

American artist

- Jefferies in circa 2002
- Born: Walter Matthew Jefferies; August 12, 1921; Lebanon, Pennsylvania, U.S.
- Died: July 21, 2003 (aged 81); Los Angeles, California, U.S.
- Occupations: Artist, set designer, writer, flight test engineer
- Spouse: Mary Ann
- Website: www.mattjefferies.com

Walter Matthew Jefferies (August 12, 1921 – July 21, 2003) was an American aviation and mechanical artist, set designer, and writer. He is best known for his work on the original Star Trek television series, where he designed many of the sets and props, including the original Starship Enterprise, and its bridge and sickbay.

== Early life ==
Jefferies was born in Lebanon, Pennsylvania. He had three brothers, John, Richard and Philip, the latter two of whom would become production designers. Their father was chief engineer at a power plant in Virginia. Matt's younger brother John worked with him as his chief draftsman.

He served in Europe in World War II, was inside of B-17, B-24, B-25 bombers and had four years as a flight test engineer.

== Star Trek ==
Original USS Enterprise model at the MIT Museum in 2026. The model was designed by Jeffries

Besides creating interiors and exterior of the Enterprise, Jefferies was responsible for designing props (including phasers), sets, the Klingon logo and D-7 battlecruiser. Years later, his concept sketches were revisited and used to design the Starship Enterprise, the Olympic class USS Pasteur, the Daedalus-class and pre-Federation Vulcan ships. Jefferies worked with NASA engineers in designing the Enterprise and the technology it used.

Contrary to popular belief, Jefferies did not create Star Trek's original shuttlecraft design: although Jefferies submitted his own concept, it was too complex to build with the show's FX and budget limitations of the time. Gene Winfield's much simpler design was used instead, and Jefferies designed only its interior.

Jefferies had a very pragmatic design ethic: reasoning that a starship's engines would be extremely powerful and potentially dangerous, he positioned them far away from the rest of the ship, with the added benefit of modular design so that they could be ejected quickly in an emergency. Figuring that whatever could go wrong would, he put all of the ship's workings on the interior for easy access, eliminating the need for spacewalking in case of exterior repairs. The bridge panels were given an ergonomic design for comfort and ease of use. He was opposed to the idea of PADDs, as well as the goose-neck viewers that appeared in the first pilot. Moreover, he disliked the idea of a large engine room because by his reckoning the entire ship could be run by a single panel on the bridge. Later, Jefferies' work on the bridge of the Enterprise influenced the design of the U.S. Navy master communications center at Naval Base San Diego.

When Jefferies saw Star Trek: The Motion Picture he fell asleep. He never watched subsequent incarnations of Star Trek, remarking that they had turned his Navy-esque bridge into "the lobby of the Hilton."

Within the Star Trek universe, Jefferies tubes and Captain Jefferies, designer of the NX-class starships, are named in his honor. According to Jefferies, the Enterprise was Starfleet's 17th starship design and it was the first in the series, therefore the ship had the number "1701". This story is documented in one of his sketches.

In June 2003, Jefferies was the guest of honor at the presentation of a documentary about him prepared for the special edition of the Star Trek Generations DVD. Jefferies died the following month in Los Angeles of congestive heart failure.

== Additional activities ==
Matt was a member of the Aviation Space Writers' Association and one of the original members of the American Aviation Historical Society. He restored and flew period airplanes as a hobby. He owned a Waco YOC aircraft and stored it at Santa Paula Airport, California for many years. His YOC, NC17740, c/n 4279, built in 1935, is now owned by the Virginia Aeronautical Historical Society and was on display at the Virginia Aviation Museum, Richmond, Virginia.

== Personal life ==
Jefferies died July 21, 2003, in Los Angeles of congestive heart failure. He was survived by his wife, Mary Ann Jefferies.

== Filmography (as art designer) ==
- Bombers B-52 (1957)
- The Old Man and the Sea (1958)
- The Wreck of the Mary Deare (1959)
- The Untouchables (1959)
- Never So Few (1959)
- Ben Casey (1961)
- Mission: Impossible (1966)
- Star Trek: The Original Series (Set Designer; later Art Director) (1966–1969)
- Love, American Style (1969)
- Weekend of Terror (1970)
- Escape (1971)
- Little House on the Prairie (1974)
- The Loneliest Runner (1976)
- Star Trek: Phase II (1977; never aired, inspiration for Star Trek: The Motion Picture two years later)
- Dallas (1978)
- Killing Stone (1978)
