= Evolution (Star Trek: The Next Generation) =

- Star Trek: The Next Generation episode
- Episode no.: Season 3 Episode 1
- Directed by: Winrich Kolbe
- Story by: Michael Piller; Michael Wagner
- Teleplay by: Michael Piller
- Cinematography by: Marvin Rush
- Production code: 150
- Original air date: September 25, 1989
- Running time: 45 minutes

Guest appearances
- Ken Jenkins as Paul Stubbs; Whoopi Goldberg as Guinan; Mary McCusker as Nurse; Randal Patrick as Crewman #1; Majel Barrett as Computer Voice (uncredited)

Episode chronology
← Previous "Shades of Gray"	Next → "The Ensigns of Command"
- Star Trek: The Next Generation season 3

"Evolution" is the first episode of the third season of the syndicated American science fiction television series Star Trek: The Next Generation. The 49th episode overall, it first aired in the United States on September 25, 1989.

Set in the 24th century, the series follows the adventures of the Starfleet crew of the Federation starship Enterprise-D. In this episode, escaped nanites threaten the Enterprise as well as its critical research mission.

== Plot ==
The Federation starship Enterprise, under the command of Captain Jean-Luc Picard (Patrick Stewart), approaches the Kavis Alpha binary star system to perform astrophysics research under the guidance of Dr. Paul Stubbs (Ken Jenkins), analyzing the decay of neutronium as a result of a stellar explosion that occurs every 196 years and is due to occur in the next few hours. Stubbs plans to launch a probe, dubbed the Egg, to gather the data, a result of a lifetime's development. Meanwhile, Chief Medical Officer Dr. Crusher (Gates McFadden) has returned to her duties on the Enterprise after a stint at Starfleet Medical.

As the expected time of the stellar explosion nears, the ship malfunctions in odd ways (such as blaring "The Stars and Stripes Forever"), and the issue is traced to the computer core. Acting Ensign Wesley Crusher (Wil Wheaton), who had been working on a project involving microscopic nanites, realizes that he may have inadvertently let two nanites from his experiments loose. The nanites were programmed to find ways to work together and evolve. A scan of the computer core reveals that the nanites have determined a way of replicating themselves and have taken up residence in the computer core. With the computer controls unreliable, the crew and Stubbs attempt to see if they can remove the nanites from the core. However, Stubbs shoots the core with a burst of gamma radiation, destroying a large number of the nanites. They retaliate by flooding the bridge with nitrogen dioxide, which the crew overrides.

Stubbs is confined to quarters, but the nanites attempt further revenge by shocking him with electricity. Captain Picard prepares to flood the computer core with gamma radiation to remove the nanites completely, but the android Second Officer Commander Data (Brent Spiner) establishes communication with the nanites and allows them to use his body to speak with Picard. Picard realizes that the nanites are self-aware and conscious and took Stubbs' actions as hostile, but they want peace. Picard negotiates a deal to send the nanites to Kavis Alpha IV, designating it as their homeworld. The nanites agree and repair the damage to the computer core before they leave it. Stubbs launches his probe on time and collects numerous volumes of data.

== Production ==
"Evolution" features the first appearance of the new Starfleet uniforms; several cast members had complained about the previous spandex uniforms which led to their replacement with the new Mandarin-collared two-piece wool uniforms. In an appearance on The Arsenio Hall Show shortly before the episode aired, Patrick Stewart (Jean-Luc Picard) simply said, "The new uniforms don't hurt", and reviewer Keith DeCandido later praised the move in his review of the episode.

"Evolution" was the first episode of the third season, but the episode "The Ensigns of Command" was filmed first.

== Reception ==
Writing for The A.V. Club, Zack Handlen compared the episode favorably against the first episode of the previous season, "The Child" (which he considered was the worst episode of that season, disregarding the clip show episode, "Shades of Gray"). Handlen wrote that he found "Evolution" so much more enjoyable that he was "in danger of overrating it." He liked Ken Jenkins as Dr. Paul Stubbs, who "hits the line between off-puttingly arrogant and vulnerable". However, while he was glad to see the return of Gates McFadden as Beverly Crusher, he was disappointed with Diana Muldaur's absence, noting "the Pulaski and Picard relationship that was never really fulfilled." He summarized: "The characters are all where they need to be, my favorite doctor is back, and the show feels like it's ready to take that next step", and graded the episode a "B".

James Hunt of Den of Geek praised Ken Jenkins and the scenes between him and Wesley, as well as the scenes with Beverly and Guinan. He felt that the episode could have been stronger had it focused on the character threads and philosophical moments. Keith DeCandido, writing for Tor.com, lauded "the debut of the high-necked, looser uniform jackets", stating that "it's extremely good to see the crew no longer wearing the unitards", and liked the return of Dr. Crusher and actress McFadden's "superb chemistry" with Wil Wheaton, as well as the off-screen promotions of Worf and La Forge. DeCandido conceded the episode felt "unfinished" in that the episode failed to acknowledge how Wesley managed to create an entire species – "it's fobbed off in a log entry at the end" – and that there were no consequences regarding his actions almost leading to the destruction of the ship.

In 2011, this episode was noted by Forbes as one that explores the implications of advanced technology, also comparing it to the later episode "The Quality of Life" season 6, Episode 9). In 2010, Wired noted this as the episode of Star Trek that can be used to teach about nanotechnology.

== Releases ==
In July 2011, the internet streaming service Netflix made all Star Trek episodes available, which would include this episode.

The episode was released with Star Trek: The Next Generation season three DVD box set, released in the United States on July 2, 2002. This had 26 episodes of Season 3 on seven discs, with a Dolby Digital 5.1 audio track. It was released in high-definition Blu-ray in the United States on April 30, 2013.
