= Guinan (Star Trek) =

Character in Star Trek

- The Next Generation/Picard character
- Whoopi Goldberg as Guinan.
- First appearance: "The Child" (1988) (Star Trek: The Next Generation)
- Created by: Gene Roddenberry; Jaron Summers; Jon Povill; Maurice Hurley
- Portrayed by: Whoopi Goldberg; Isis Carmen Jones (young, "Rascals"); Ito Aghayere (young, Star Trek: Picard)

In-universe information
- Species: El-Aurian
- Occupation: Bartender

Guinan /ˈɡaɪnən/ is a recurring character in the Star Trek franchise, portrayed by American actress Whoopi Goldberg. The character first appeared in the television series Star Trek: The Next Generation in 1988 and went on to appear in the films Star Trek Generations and Star Trek: Nemesis as well as the television series Star Trek: Picard. She was also played as a child by Isis Carmen Jones in the episode "Rascals" and a younger version of the character by Ito Aghayere in Picard.

Guinan is a bartender in the Ten-Forward lounge aboard the starship USS Enterprise-D. The character first appears in the second-season opening episode "The Child", and makes recurring appearances during the next four seasons. Guinan was partly inspired by the Star Wars character Yoda, and is said to be hundreds of years old with corresponding wisdom and insight which she often uses to defuse difficult situations or comfort other characters.

== History ==
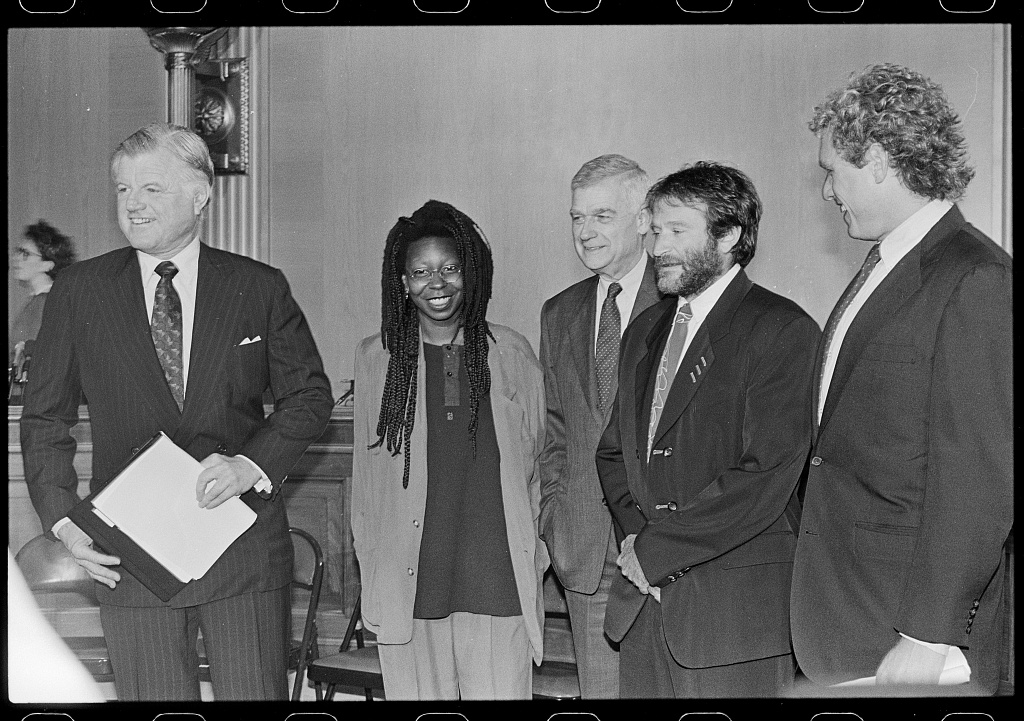
Actress Whoopi Goldberg with Senator Ted Kennedy, Senator Mark Hatfield, Representative Joseph Kennedy II and fellow actor Robin Williams in 1990

Following the departure of Denise Crosby from the role of Tasha Yar during the first season of Star Trek: The Next Generation, established actress Whoopi Goldberg believed there was a vacancy for a female actress on the series. She had been a lifelong fan of Star Trek, having been inspired to become an actress by Nichelle Nichols' appearances as Uhura in The Original Series. Goldberg later recalled that she first saw an episode of the series in her youth and after Uhura appeared on-screen, she went running through her house shouting "Come here, mom, everybody, come quick, come quick, there's a black lady on television and she ain't no maid!" Goldberg approached her friend LeVar Burton, who played Geordi La Forge in The Next Generation. However, producers of the series ignored her; by one account, the producers believed that they were being pranked until Goldberg telephoned the production office directly. However, executive producer Rick Berman later recalled it was Goldberg's manager who made the call, inviting him and series creator Gene Roddenberry out to lunch with Goldberg to discuss her appearing on the series.

At the time, plans were already underway to add a lounge set to the series. Named Ten-Forward, it was created to have a setting where the crew of the USS Enterprise-D could be shown interacting with each other as well as various aliens in a more casual setting. At the lunch between Berman, Roddenberry and Goldberg, she explained that Star Trek was the only futuristic science fiction series at the time she knew of that featured black people prominently. She asked whether they had already cast the new Doctor, following the firing of Gates McFadden from the role of Beverly Crusher. Roddenberry and Berman instead suggested the creation of a new character specifically for Goldberg. Goldberg was unable to commit to appearing as a permanent member of the cast, which fit in with plans for Ten-Forward as they were not expecting the lounge to appear in every episode.

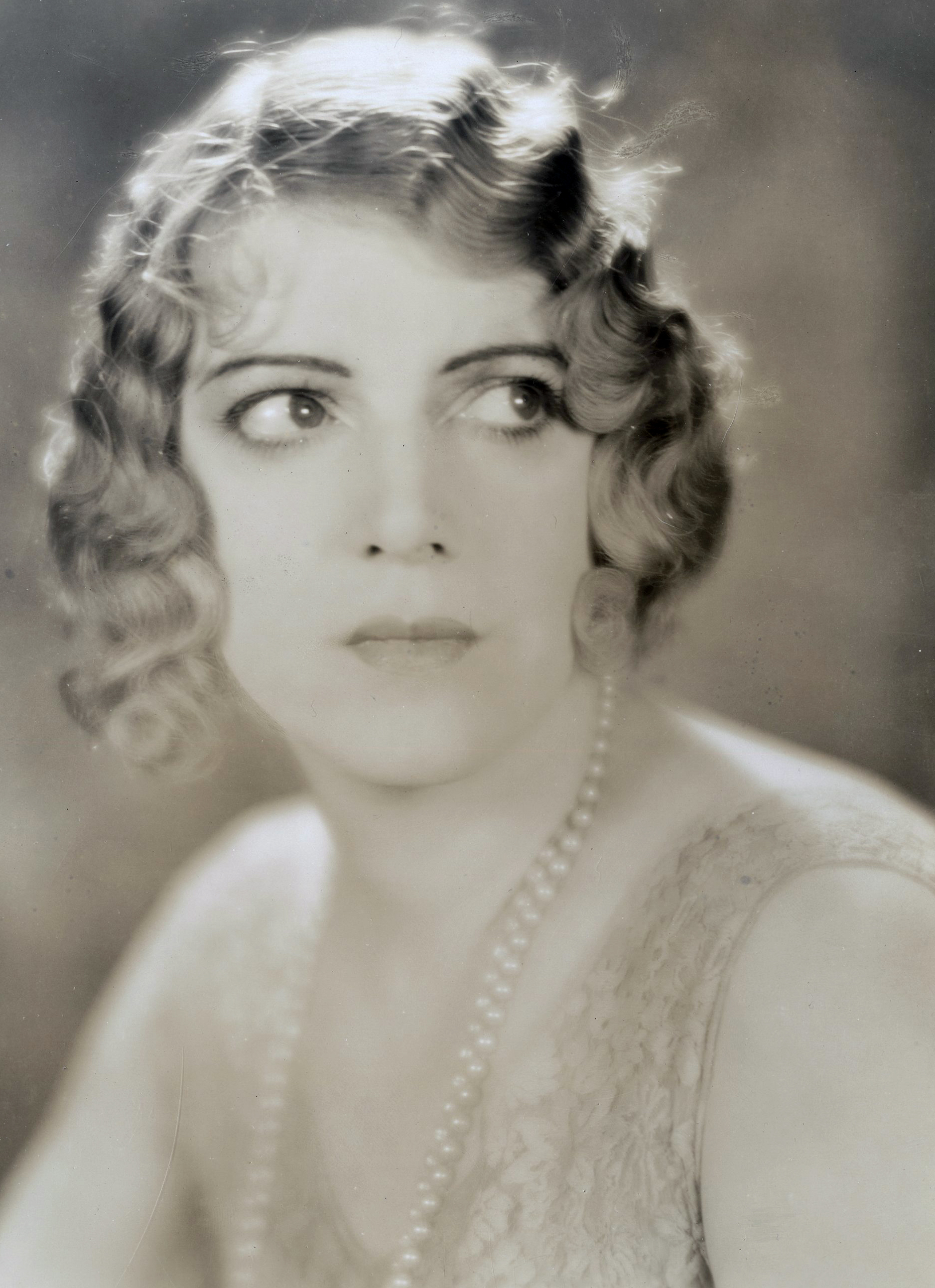
"Texas" Guinan, the namesake and inspiration for the Star Trek character Guinan

The character of Guinan was based on Mary Louise Cecilia "Texas" Guinan, a prohibition-era emcee and owner of the 300 Club in New York City. While the name was adopted, the characterization was changed to a worldly mystic, in line with Yoda from the Star Wars franchise. Gene Roddenberry, the creator of Star Trek, had envisaged the character Guinan as extremely old, leading Goldberg to suggest that she could be the ancestor of some of the other characters on the series.

When Goldberg made her first appearance as Guinan, in the episode "The Child", she was credited as a "Special Guest Star" alongside Diana Muldaur who appeared throughout the second season as Doctor Katherine Pulaski. Guinan-centric episodes were scheduled throughout the rest of the run of The Next Generation to coincide with the availability of Goldberg, who at the time was continuing to appear in films and other work. In one instance, for "Imaginary Friend", Guinan was written in at short notice, taking lines intended for other characters after Goldberg unexpectedly became available.

There were plans to introduce a son of Guinan at some point in The Next Generation, but this never occurred. The idea was resurrected during the writing process of the Star Trek: Deep Space Nine episode "Rivals", with the character of Martus Mazur intended to be Guinan's son. After Goldberg was unable to make a guest appearance, the relationship between the two characters was written out. However, the first time that the El-Aurian species was mentioned by name was in this episode, but this may have been inspired by the scripts for Star Trek Generations which the writing team would have seen by that point in the production of the series.

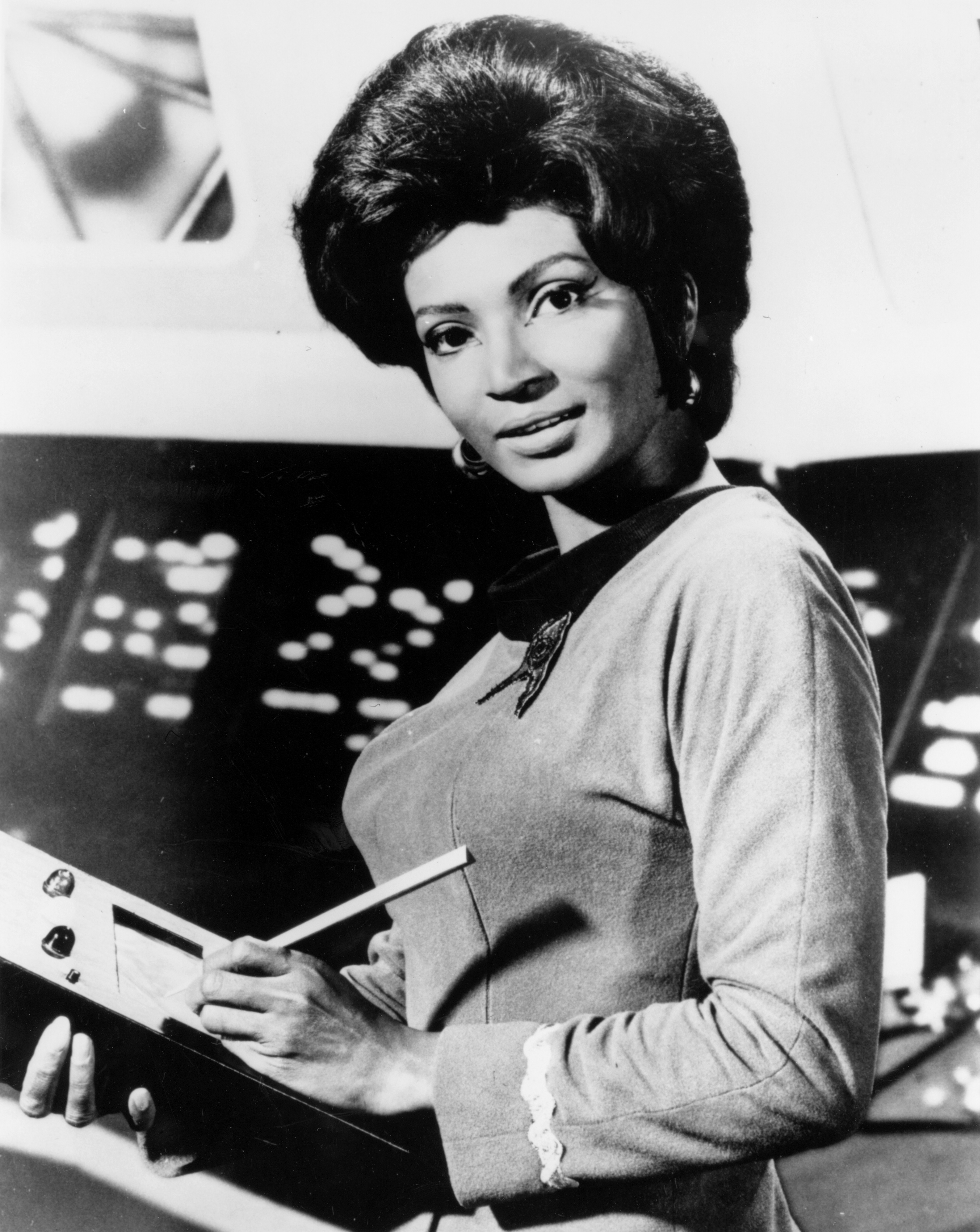
Nichelle Nichols as Uhura was an inspiration for Goldberg growing up.

Goldberg became a personal friend of creator Gene Roddenberry, subsequently being one of the eulogists at his funeral in 1991. During the initial production of Star Trek VI: The Undiscovered Country, she met with director Nicholas Meyer to discuss appearing as a Klingon in the film. This was vetoed by actor Leonard Nimoy, who had taken the lead on arrangements for the film, as with Christian Slater already set to appear in the film he did not want to be overwhelmed with celebrity cameos. She later described Guinan as a combination of Yoda, herself and Andrei Sakharov, adding that she was "more grateful for Star Trek now as a mother and grandmother" and described the prospect of Star Trek, saying "We all need to believe there is a good, positive future for us."

Goldberg stated at her first Star Trek convention in 2016 that she wishes to return to the franchise and appear on Star Trek: Discovery in the future since the character was specifically designed to be able to appear at any point in the timeline. Returning actor-character combinations are famous in the Star Trek franchise, and popular also; TNG's "Unification" (1991) episodes featuring Leonard Nimoy as Spock in Part II brought in the highest Nielsen ratings (15.4) of that season, and the highest for TNG except for the pilot and finale (see also Star Trek crossovers). During a January 22, 2020, appearance on The View, the talk show of which Goldberg is a co-host, Patrick Stewart helped realize Goldberg's wish, inviting her to appear as Guinan during the second season of Star Trek: Picard, which she ultimately did.

=== Films ===
The decision was made to feature Goldberg prominently in the first feature film based on The Next Generation, Star Trek Generations. This was due in part to her being far more well known to the general public than the majority of the main cast, having won the Academy Award for Best Supporting Actress at the 63rd Academy Awards in 1991 for her role in the film Ghost. During the course of the film, the character is revealed for the first time to be an El-Aurian. Upon arriving on the first day of production of Generations, Goldberg began looking around the set for Nichols, having expected her to be there since it was a cross-over film between The Original Series and The Next Generation. It was later reported by Walter Koenig that Goldberg was annoyed as she saw that the fans wanted a scene with Guinan and Uhura together. Nichols did not appear in Generations.

== Production ==
Producer Rick Berman was noted as being "extremely sensitive" about who interacted with Goldberg on the set, according to the book The Making of Yesterday's Enterprise by Eric A. Stillwell. In one instance where a co-writer of Yesterday's Enterprise talked with Goldberg, Berman found out about it and said he did not want this kind of interaction which was oriented towards the production office.

== Appearances ==
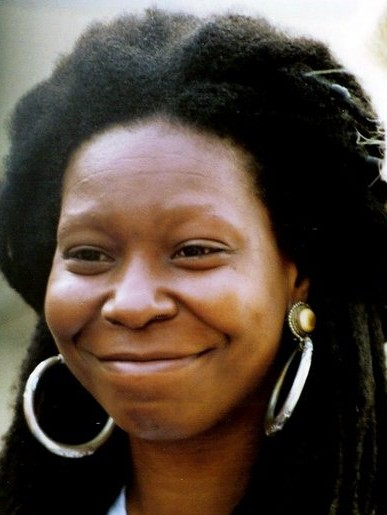
Whoopi Goldberg at the 1992 Cannes film festival

In "Rascals", Guinan's younger self is played by Isis Carmen Jones, who also played Goldberg's character as a child in the film Sister Act (1992). Guinan works in Ten-Forward and often appears in episodes to converse with characters to help them resolve their issue at hand. She most commonly interacts with long-time friend Picard, but is known to help others as well.

Guinan made her first appearance in the second season opening episode "The Child" on November 21, 1988, on first-run syndicated television. During the course of the episode, she gives advice to Wesley Crusher (Wil Wheaton) about whether he should leave the ship to join his mother when she transferred to Starfleet Medical on Earth. In this episode, she refers to meeting Captain Jean-Luc Picard (Patrick Stewart) for the first time when she came on board the Enterprise-D, something which was later ignored and discounted. She made further appearances in the second season, including in "The Outrageous Okona" where she advises Data to use the holodeck to help him better understand comedy, and again in the Data-centric episode "The Measure of a Man", as well as "The Dauphin" where she and Commander William Riker (Jonathan Frakes) attempt to explain flirting to Wesley Crusher.

The first revelation of Guinan being something more than a simple barkeeper came later that season in the episode "Q Who". After Q (John de Lancie) sends the Enterprise-D across the galaxy, causing them to encounter the Borg, she trades barbs with the omnipotent being who reveals that he knows Guinan from past encounters and suggests she may have been known by other names in the past. Q attempts to remove Guinan from the Enterprise, only to have her hold up her hands to him in response implying she possessed the power to do battle with him or at the very least to defend herself. She also informs Picard that the Borg drove her species into near extinction over a century earlier. She returned once more in the second episode of the third season, "Evolution", in which she explains she has many children, and later in the season in "Booby Trap" where she reveals that she finds the heads of bald men attractive. She once again comes face to face with Q in "Deja Q". Guinan is central to the plot of "Yesterday's Enterprise", when the timeline is changed after the USS Enterprise-C appears from a spatial rift. Guinan is the only member of the crew who is aware that something has changed, and believes that Lieutenant Tasha Yar (Denise Crosby) should not be on the ship. The timeline is restored when the Enterprise-C re-enters the rift.

Guinan appears in part one of "The Best of Both Worlds", where she and Captain Picard mull over his tactics defending the ship from a Borg vessel, contemplating the potential end of human civilization. Guinan assures Picard that, based on her experience with the Borg, "humanity will survive" even if only a handful of humans live to "keep the spirit alive". Guinan also plays a role in the second part which started the fourth season. She advises Commander Riker in his predicament in dealing with the Borg-assimilated Picard. She tells him that her relationship with Picard "goes beyond friendship and beyond family", but advises Riker that he must find a way to stop the assimilated Locutus by not thinking like Picard. She appears in the following episode broadcast, which follows up on Picard's experiences as a Borg, "Family". In "The Loss", Guinan advises Counselor Deanna Troi (Marina Sirtis) when she loses her empathic senses, telling her that she still has her skills as a counselor to rely on. Guinan joins Picard in his holodeck program Dixon Hill in the episode "Clues". Her other appearances in the season included "Galaxy's Child", "Night Terrors" where she reveals she keeps a rifle behind the bar, "In Theory", and the first part of "Redemption" where she scores higher than Klingon Security Chief Worf (Michael Dorn) on a firing range on the holodeck.

Her first appearance in the fifth season comes in the first episode, the second part of "Redemption". In "Ensign Ro", she strikes up a friendship with Ensign Ro Laren (Michelle Forbes) which continued for the rest of the other recurring character's appearances in the series. In "Imaginary Friend", Guinan discusses the nearby nebula with Data in Ten-Forward. In the following episode, "I, Borg", Guinan objects to the presence of the Borg known as Hugh on the Enterprise-D. Further revelations of Guinan's backstory are made in the season finale, the first part of "Time's Arrow", when after travelling back to 19th century San Francisco, Data discovers a photograph of Guinan in a local newspaper. Meanwhile, on the Enterprise-D, Guinan advises Picard that he must lead the away team to travel through a temporal rift to save Data in the past.

Central to the plot of the second half of "Time's Arrow" which opened the sixth season, Guinan meets Picard for the first time in her timeline and works with him and Samuel Clemens to prevent a plot by the aliens of Devidia II. In "Rascals", alongside Picard, Ro, and Keiko O'Brien (Rosalind Chao), her body is de-aged to that of a child following a transporter accident, where the younger Guinan was portrayed by actress Isis Jones. Guinan reveals that her father is still alive at the time, having previously been hiding from him on Earth during "Time's Arrow". In "Suspicions", she advises Doctor Beverly Crusher (Gates McFadden) on whether to trust her instincts when a Ferengi scientist is killed during an experiment on board.

Guinan is originally from El-Auria. Her people, sometimes called "listeners", had been scattered throughout the galaxy after the Borg invaded their homeworld. As a refugee aboard the El-Aurian vessel Lakul, she is rescued from the Nexus by the USS Enterprise-B. This is part of the opening act of Star Trek Generations, the 1994 film made after the series' seven-year run concluded. Guinan did not appear in the next two Star Trek films (First Contact and Insurrection).

Guinan reveals in Nemesis that she has been married 23 times. She states in "Evolution" that she has many children, including a son who went through a phase when "he wouldn't listen to anybody"—something unusual "in a species of listeners".

Guinan appears in the second season premiere of Star Trek: Picard, when Jean-Luc Picard visits her at her bar in Los Angeles called 10 Forward Avenue. Guinan has also adjusted her physical age so that she appears older as humans do not like to be reminded of their mortality. After time traveling back to 2024 in order to correct the timeline, Picard and his crew encounter a younger version of Guinan living on Earth in the 21st century who aids them. Following Picard's return to the present, he visits Guinan who had kept their history in the past a secret in order to preserve the timeline and reveals what had become of Cristobal Rios and Picard's friends from the 21st century. As seen in the third season premiere, Guinan decided to capitalize on the upcoming Frontier Day holiday by selling small models of the various Enterprises in her bar.

=== Television ===
Guinan appears in 29 episodes of Star Trek: The Next Generation, five episodes of Star Trek: Picard and in two theatrical films, Generations (1994) and Nemesis (2002).

==== Star Trek: The Next Generation ====
- "The Child"
- "The Outrageous Okona"
- "The Measure of a Man"
- "The Dauphin"
- "Q Who"
- "Shades of Gray"
- "Evolution"
- "Booby Trap"
- "Deja Q"
- "Yesterday's Enterprise"
- "The Offspring"
- "Hollow Pursuits"
- "The Best of Both Worlds" (Parts 1 & 2)
- "Family"
- "The Loss"
- "Clues"
- "Galaxy's Child"
- "Night Terrors"
- "In Theory"
- "Redemption" (Parts 1 & 2)
- "Ensign Ro"
- "Imaginary Friend"
- "I, Borg"
- "Time's Arrow" (Parts 1 & 2)
- "Rascals"
- "Suspicions"

==== Star Trek: Picard ====
- "The Star Gazer"
- "Watcher"
- "Monsters"
- "Mercy"
- "Farewell"

Among the episodes with Guinan, "The Measure of a Man", "Yesterday's Enterprise", and the two-part episode "The Best of Both Worlds" received noted acclaim, and an extended cut of "The Measure of a Man" was released in 2012.

=== Film ===
Generations

In Star Trek Generations, released in 1994, Guinan explains the Nexus to Picard.

Nemesis

In Star Trek: Nemesis, released in 2002, Guinan has attended the wedding between Riker and Troi.

=== Comics ===
The character Guinan, looking like the TNG character, appears in various TNG comics series including:

- A line and ink style Comic version of Guinan appears on the cover of Star Trek: The Next Generation Special "Good Listener/A True Son of Kahless" published September 1, 1993.
- Star Trek: The Next Generation
  - 80 issues from 1989 to 1996
- Star Trek: The Next Generation Special
  - Three issues 1993-1995
- Star Trek: The Next Generation: The Last Generation
  - Five issues 2008-09
- Star Trek: The Next Generation - Doctor Who: Assimilation²
  - Eight issues in 2012 (Crossover with Doctor Who franchise)

=== Novels ===
The first novel to include Guinan was Strike Zone by Peter David, published in March 1989. This novel included elements from both Star Trek (1966–1969) and The Next Generation. The later Stargazer novel Oblivion features Picard's first meeting with Guinan when he was still captain of the Stargazer, where the meeting helps Guinan overcome her severe depression after she was pulled out of the Nexus.

== Reception and commentary ==
"This was one of my greatest experiences, I’ve said this on the show before, Star Trek was one of the great experiences from the beginning to the end. I had the best, best, best time – the best time ever"

— Whoopi Goldberg

Lina Morgan in her article for Syfy Wire on Guinan's quintessential moments, described her as "easily one of the best characters in the history of Star Trek". His list of moments consisted of the one in "The Measure of a Man" where Guinan explains slavery to Picard; the time that she stabbed Q with a fork in "Deja Q"; the discussion she has with Commander Riker in "The Best of Both Worlds" and her lack of sympathy for the Borg in "I, Borg". Morgan did state that her favourite moment came in the second part of "Time's Arrow" where she and Picard are trapped in the cave and the sexual tension between the pair, comparing the relationship between that of River Song and The Doctor in Doctor Who whereby they meet each other for the first time but out of sequence.

Terry Erdmann and Paula Block state in their 2008 book Star Trek 101 that the key Guinan episode is "Yesterday's Enterprise". They describe her role in the episode as that of a Greek chorus to explain that a change has taken place in the timeline.

Film reviewer Roger Ebert described Guinan as "the Enterprise's resident mystic".

In 2016, SyFy rated Guinan as among the top 21 most interesting supporting characters of Star Trek, noting that she was a mysterious character that kept audiences guessing. In 2017, IndieWire rated Guinan as the third-best character on The Next Generation, noting her as a "fascinating character". In the summer of 2019, Screen Rant suggested that Guinan could get her own series more easily, due to the character being hundreds of years old there would be many, many stories to tell. In 2018, CBR ranked Guinan the 8th best recurring character of all Star Trek.

In 2018, Screen Rant ranked Guinan as one of the top eight most powerful characters of Star Trek, remarking "Guinan is one of Star Trek's greatest enigmas." In July 2019, Screen Rant ranked Guinan the 7th smartest character of Star Trek.

== See also ==
- List of Star Trek: The Next Generation characters
- List of Star Trek: The Next Generation cast members
- Star Trek (film series)
