= 2010 Independent Spirit Awards =

The 2010 Independent Spirit Awards can refer to:

- 25th Independent Spirit Awards, a ceremony held in 2010, honoring the films of 2009
- 26th Independent Spirit Awards, a ceremony held in 2011, honoring the films of 2010
