= 2009 Independent Spirit Awards =

The 2009 Independent Spirit Awards can refer to:

- 24th Independent Spirit Awards, a ceremony held in 2009, honoring the films of 2008
- 25th Independent Spirit Awards, a ceremony held in 2010, honoring the films of 2009
