= Earl Boen =

American actor (1941–2023)

- Boen in 1980
- Born: August 8, 1941; New York City, U.S.
- Died: January 5, 2023 (aged 81); Honolulu, Hawaii, U.S.
- Other name: Oscar Earl Nitz Boen
- Occupation: Actor
- Years active: 1971–2017
- Spouses: Carole Kean (m. 1970; died 2001) Cathy Boen (m. 2008)
- Children: 1

Earl Boen (/ˈboʊ.ən/; August 8, 1941 – January 5, 2023) was an American actor. He is perhaps best known for portraying criminal psychiatrist Doctor Peter Silberman from the Terminator franchise.

Boen was also very active in the voice-over field, voicing characters such as Horace Bleakman in the Clifford the Big Red Dog television series, Police Chief Kanifky in Bonkers, the narrator and King Terenas Menethil II in World of Warcraft, Señor Senior Sr. in Kim Possible and LeChuck in the Monkey Island video game series.

== Early life ==
Earl Boen was born on August 8, 1941, in New York City.

== Career ==
=== Film and television ===
In 1977, Boen made his television series debut in The Streets of San Francisco and feature film debut in Mr. Billion.

Some of Boen's subsequent television appearances include Hawaii Five-O, The Jeffersons, Judge Barnes on What's Happening! and District Attorney Hepburn on Kojak. Boen played the Harper family's pastor, the Rev. Lloyd Meechum in a recurring role on the 1980s sitcom Mama's Family. He also appeared as a clergyman in episodes of The Golden Girls, The Golden Palace, The Wonder Years, Boy Meets World, Seinfeld and Three's Company.

Boen appeared in two episodes of Matlock, and as Willie's boss in ALF. Boen played Jim Petersen, Angela Bower's boss on the show Who's The Boss?. He had a recurring role as Dr. Kramer in the 1990s Fox series Get a Life. Boen appeared (alongside Tom Jones) in an episode of The Fresh Prince of Bel-Air in 1993 as a Princeton admissions agent.

In film, Boen was well-known for playing criminal psychiatrist Dr. Peter Silberman in The Terminator (1984), Terminator 2: Judgment Day (1991), and Terminator 3: Rise of the Machines (2003). Other films in which he appeared include The Main Event (1979), Battle Beyond the Stars (1980), 9 to 5 (1980), Soggy Bottom, U.S.A. (1981), The Man with Two Brains (1983), To Be or Not to Be (1983), Alien Nation (1988), Marked for Death (1990), Naked Gun 33 1/3: The Final Insult (1994), and Nutty Professor II: The Klumps (2000).

Boen retired from screen acting in 2003, but continued his work as a voice actor in radio, television cartoons and video games.

=== Voice acting ===
Boen had a voice role as Taurus in the direct to video G.I. Joe: The Movie (1987). He voiced Police Chief Kanifky in Bonkers, Horace Bleakman in the Clifford the Big Red Dog television series, and Señor Senior Sr. in Kim Possible. He also voiced the villainous pirate LeChuck from the Monkey Island series of adventure games. He also provided the introductions for World of Warcraft and its expansions, voiced Magtheridon in World of Warcraft: The Burning Crusade and King Terenas Menethil II in World of Warcraft: Wrath of the Lich King, including the cinematic trailer and ending cutscene for that expansion, which featured the iconic line "no king rules forever, my son."

He also voiced the omnipotent alien Nagilum in a second season episode of Star Trek: The Next Generation.

Boen voiced the dramatic thespian Edwin Blackgaard in Focus on the Family's "Adventures in Odyssey", as well as Edwin's nefarious twin brother Regis. He portrayed Sergei Gurlukovich in Metal Gear Solid 2: Sons of Liberty, a role that he later reprised in the Metal Gear Solid 2: Substance rerelease and the official digital graphic novel. Other roles include Colossus in X-Men: Legends and a variety of characters across multiple Star Trek titles, including Bridge Commander and Armada II.

Boen's voice was heard on the Disneyland Railroad from 2002 until 2016 and on the Walt Disney World Railroad from 2002 until late 2010.

He continued in voice-over work until his full retirement from acting in 2017.

== Personal life and death ==
Boen married actress Carole Kean in 1970. She died on April 23, 2001, from ovarian cancer at the age of 58. Together they had a daughter. Boen married his second wife, Cathy, in 2008, they remained married until his death in 2023. Boen was the stepfather of Cathy's daughter Ruby and also had two grandchildren.

Boen was diagnosed with lung cancer in the fall of 2022. He died in Honolulu on January 5, 2023, at the age of 81.

== Filmography ==
=== Live-action ===
==== Film ====
Year	Title	Role	Notes
1977	Mr. Billion	Colonel Winkle's Aide	
1978
1978	Eight Is Enough	Unknown	
1978	The Fifth Floor	Phil	
1979	Barnaby Jones	Eddie	
1979	The Main Event	"Nose" Kline	
1979	A Man Called Sloane	Prentiss	
1980	Battle Beyond the Stars	Nester 1	
1980	9 to 5	Perkins	
1981	I'm a Big Girl Now	Dr. Michaels	
1981	Soggy Bottom, U.S.A	Owen	
1982	King's Crossing	Dr. Rivkin	
1982	Barney Miller	Warren Gimble	
1982	The Powers of Matthew Star	Mr. Hansley	
1982	Madame's Place	Judge Blake	
1982	Three's Company	Reverend Gilmore	
1983	Amanda's	Fred Cornwall	
1983	Fantasy Island	Henry	
1983	The Man with Two Brains	Dr. Felix Conrad	
1983	Just Our Luck	Judge	
1983	To Be or Not to Be	Dr. Boyarski	
1984	The Terminator	Dr. Peter Silberman	
1985	Movers & Shakers	Marshall	
1987	Walk Like a Man	Jack Mollins	
1988	Alien Nation	Duncan Crais	
1988	Miracle Mile	Drunk Man in Diner	
1988	My Stepmother Is an Alien	Reverend	
1990	Marked for Death	Dr. Stein	
1991	Terminator 2: Judgment Day	Dr. Peter Silberman	
1994	Naked Gun 33 1/3: The Final Insult	Dr. Stuart Eisendrath	
1996	The Dentist	Marvin Goldblum	
1996	The Prince	Mr. Howell	
1997	Living in Peril	Fingerprint Technician	
1998	The Odd Couple II	Fred	
2000	Nutty Professor II: The Klumps	Dr. Knoll	
2002	Now You Know	Grandpa	
2003	Terminator 3: Rise of the Machines	Dr. Peter Silberman	Last on-screen appearance
2019	Terminator: Dark Fate	Dr. Peter Silberman (archive footage, uncredited)	Via footage from Terminator 2: Judgment Day (1991)

==== Television ====
Year	Title	Role	Notes
1971	Great Performances	Le Bret	Cyrano de Bergerac
1976	The Taming of the Shrew	Pedant	Television film
1977	The Streets of San Francisco	Frank Jennings	Episodes: "Monkey is Back"
1977	What's Happening!	Judge Barnes	Episode: "Rerun Gets Married"
1977	Kojak	District Attorney Hepburn	Episode: "The Queen of Hearts is Wild"
1977	Rafferty	Vandler	Episode: "Walking Wounded"
1977	Hawaii Five-O	Denisovich	Episode: "Deadly Doubles"
1977	Wonder Woman	Chaka	Episode: "Mind Stealers from Outer Space"
1978	Last of the Good Guys	Ike	Television film
1978	Police Woman	Myron	Episode: "Sweet Kathleen"
1978	Richie Brockelman, Private Eye	Tausig	Episode: "The Framing of Perfect Sydney"
1978	Lou Grant	Vice-Cop	Episode: "Hooker"
1978	The Paper Chase	Nick Burch	Episode: "Nancy"
1979	Last of the Good Guys	Ike	Television film
1979	Buck Rogers in the 25th Century	Selmar the Telepath	Episode: "Cosmic Whiz Kid"
1979	The Paul Williams Show	Virgil Weeks	
1979	The Jeffersons	Nathan Weems	Episode: "The Expectant Father"
1980	Angie	Dr. Learner	Episode: "Angie and Brad's Close Encounter"
1981	The Dukes of Hazzard	Eustice Hastings	Episode: "Along Came a Duke"
1981	Soap	Dr. Drell	Season 4, Episode 12
1981	Family Ties	House Guest 'Ed Barker'	Episode: "4 Rms Ocn Vu"
1981–1982	It's a Living	Dennis Hubner	Unknown episodes
1981–1983	Benson	Kocholnik, Mr. Tucker	Unknown episodes
1982	M*A*S*H	Major Robert Hatch	Episode: "Heroes"
1983–1990	Mama's Family	Reverend Meechum	Recurring role
1984–1986	Punky Brewster	Oliver Green	Episodes: "Dog Dough Afternoon", "Changes, part 5"
1985	Growing Pains	Dr. Marlens	Episode: "Standardized Test"
1986	Annihilator	Sid	Television film
1987–1988	The Law & Harry McGraw	Howard	16 episodes
1988	Star Trek: The Next Generation	Nagilum	Episode: "Where Silence Has Lease"
1988–1993	L.A. Law	Judge Walter L. Swanson	8 episodes
1990	Tales from the Crypt	Mr. Clayton	Episode: "Dead Right"
1990	Empty Nest	Lou	Episode: "Harry's Excellent Adventure"
1990, 1992	The Golden Girls	Reverend	2 episodes
1991	Seinfeld	Eulogist	Episode: "The Pony Remark"
1991	Family Matters	Dr. Goodrich	Episode: "Words Hurt"
1993	The Golden Palace	Priest	Episode: "One Angry Stan"
1994	Lois & Clark: The New Adventures of Superman	Dr. Heller	Episode: "Madame Ex"
1996	Within the Rock	Michael Isaacs	Television film
1996	Ellen	Hubert Warwell	Episode: "The Tape"
2000	Ali: An American Hero	Howard Cosell	Television film
2001	The Jennie Project	Reverend Palliser	Television film
2001	The West Wing	Paulson	Episode: "Manchester"
2003	The Practice	Dr. David Broadman	Episode: "Burnout"

=== Voice-over roles ===
==== Film ====
Year	Title	Role	Notes
1987	G.I. Joe: The Movie	Taurus	Direct-to-video
1995	Gordy	Minnesota Red	
1996	Dot and Spot's Magical Christmas	Santa	
2001	The Majestic	Newsreel Announcer	
2002	The Wild Thornberrys Movie	Gorilla	
2003	Porco Rosso	Additional voices	English dub
2004	Clifford's Really Big Movie	Horace Bleakman	
2005	The Toy Warrior	Additional voices	

==== Television ====
Year	Title	Role	Notes
1988	A Pup Named Scooby-Doo	Mr. Gordon, The Ghost of Chef Pierre Goulash	Episode: "Robopup"
1988–1989	Fantastic Max	Additional voices	3 episodes
1989	The Further Adventures of SuperTed	Additional voices	13 episodes
1989	X-Men: Pryde of the X-Men	Magneto	TV pilot; credited as Earl Bowen
1989–1990	Paddington Bear	Additional voices	2 episodes
1991	The Pirates of Dark Water	Lugg Brother #1	3 episodes
1991	3×3 Eyes	Benares	English dub
1992–1993	The Addams Family	Additional voices	21 episodes
1993	SWAT Kats: The Radical Squadron	Jack, King	Episode: "The Pastmaster Always Rings Twice"
1993	Problem Child	Additional voices	
1993–1994	Bonkers	Police Chief Kanifky	37 episodes
1986–1994	ABC Weekend Special	Monostatos, General Massey	2 episodes
1993–1995	Batman: The Animated Series	Rhino	2 episodes
1993	The Fresh Prince of Bel-Air	Ed	Episode: "The Alma Matter"
1994–1995	Skeleton Warriors		11 episodes
1995	Animaniacs	Zeus	Episode: "Hercules Unwound"
1995–1997	Pinky and the Brain	Earth, Moon, Santa Claus	2 episodes
1995	What-a-Mess	Additional voices	3 episodes
1995	Capitol Critters	Additional voices	Episode: "The Bug House"
1996–1997	The Real Adventures of Jonny Quest	Dr. Forbes, Kyle, Stage Coach Guard	3 episodes
1996	Wing Commander Academy	Commander	Episode: "Red and Blue"
1996	Bruno the Kid	Additional voices	
1997	Extreme Ghostbusters		Ep. "Casting the Runes"
1996–1998	The Fantastic Voyages of Sinbad the Sailor	Additional voices	26 episodes
1997	The New Adventures of Zorro	Captain Montecero	Episode: "To Catch a Fox"
1997–1998	Spider-Man: The Animated Series	Red Skull, Beyonder	8 episodes
1997	The New Batman Adventures	Rhino	Episode: "Double Talk"
1998	The Sylvester & Tweety Mysteries	Vice President Obsequious	Episode: "Spooker of the House/Furgo"
1998–2002	Dexter's Laboratory	General, Commander Chief, Man #2	2 episodes
1999	Cow and Chicken	Ben Franklin, John Hancock, Mr. Rossl	Episode: "I.M. Weasel: Revolutionary Weasel"
2000	Buzz Lightyear of Star Command	Nick	Episode: "Holiday Time"
2000–2002	Clifford the Big Red Dog	Horace Bleakman	6 episodes
2001	The Zeta Project	Event Judge	Episode: "Remote Control"
2001–2004	Grim & Evil	Doctor, TV Narrator, Monster, Mr. Hobson	2 episodes
2001	Johnny Bravo	Santa Claus, Jay the Bear, Norman	Episode: "A Johnny Bravo Christmas"
2002	Time Squad	William Howard Taft, Frankenstein	Episode: "White House Weirdness"
2002–2006	Kim Possible	Señor Senior Sr.	4 episodes; role shared with Ricardo Montalbán
2002	Justice League	Simon Stagg	Episode: "Metamorphosis"
2003	Evil Con Carne	Vlad	Episode: "Boskov's Day Out"
2004	Megas XLR	Emperor, Subject	Episode: "Coop D'Etat"

==== Video games ====
Year	Title	Role	Notes
1995	Shannara	Troll Cook, Kili	
1997	The Curse of Monkey Island	LeChuck	
1997	Zork: Grand Inquisitor	Brog, Sea Captain	
1998	Return to Krondor		
1998	Baldur's Gate	Montaron, Thalantyr	
1999	Revenant	Ogrok Chef, Ogrok Slag	
1999	Toy Story 2: Buzz Lightyear to the Rescue	Rex	
1999	Sword of the Berserk: Guts' Rage	Balzac	English dub
2000	Soldier of Fortune	Sergei Dekker	
2000	Alundra 2: A New Legend Begins	Zeppo	
2000	Orphen: Scion of Sorcery	Zeus	
2000	Star Trek: Voyager – Elite Force	Vorhsoth, Imperial Officer, Crewman	
2000	Escape from Monkey Island	Charles L. Charles, LeChuck, Pirate C	
2000	Tenchu 2: Birth of Stealth Assassins	The Narrator	English dub
2000	Clifford the Big Red Dog: Thinking Adventures	Horace Bleakman, Traffic People	
2001	Kingdom Under Fire: A War of Heroes		
2001	Toy Story Racer	Rex	
2001	Fallout Tactics: Brotherhood of Steel	Ghoul Officer Fisher, Mayor Richard, Vault-Tec Computer Calix	
2001	Black & White	Nemesis	
2001	Atlantis The Lost Empire: Search for the Journal	Commander Lyle Rourke	
2001	Atlantis The Lost Empire: Trial by Fire	Commander Lyle Rourke	
2001	Metal Gear Solid 2: Sons of Liberty	Sergei Gurlukovich	
2001	Baldur's Gate: Dark Alliance	Additional voices	
2001	Star Trek: Armada II		
2002	Blood Omen 2	Sarafan Lord, Additional voices	
2002	New Legends	Boo, Tracker, Wounded Soldier	
2002	Star Trek: Bridge Commander	Captain Draxon, Director Toban Soams, Legate Matan	
2002	Eternal Darkness	Inspector Legrasse	
2002	Icewind Dale II	Lord Ulbrec	
2002	The Scorpion King: Rise of the Akkadian	Narrator, King Urmhet, Passenger	
2002	Kim Possible: Revenge of Monkey Fist	Señor Senior, Sr	Credited as Earl Brown
2002	Soldier of Fortune II: Double Helix	Sam Gladstone, Alexei Nachrade	
2003	RTX Red Rock	Boris Dezurov, Adjutant	
2003	Lionheart	Additional voices	
2003	Lionheart: Legacy of the Crusader	Additional voices	
2003	Call of Duty	Additional voices	English dub
2004	Fallout: Brotherhood of Steel	Additional voices	
2004	X-Men Legends	Colossus	
2004	EverQuest II	Master Rysian Gladewalker, Mirin, Fisherman Draylix	
2004	World of Warcraft	Narrator	
2005	Psychonauts	Butcher	
2007	World of Warcraft: The Burning Crusade	Narrator, Magtheridon	
2008	World of Warcraft: Wrath of the Lich King	Narrator, King Terenas Menethil	
2009	Tales of Monkey Island	LeChuck	
2009	The Secret of Monkey Island: Special Edition	LeChuck, Fester Shinetop	Remake of 1990 game
2010	Monkey Island 2: LeChuck's Revenge: Special Edition	LeChuck	Remake of 1991 game
2010	World of Warcraft: Cataclysm	The Narrator	
2012	World of Warcraft: Mists of Pandaria	Hekima the Wise	
2014	Hearthstone	Hekima the Wise	
2014	World of Warcraft: Warlords of Draenor	Additional voices	
2016	World of Warcraft: Legion	Magtheridon	

==== Radio ====
Year	Title	Role	Notes
1987–2015	Adventures in Odyssey	Dr. Regis Blackgaard, R. Edwin Blackgaard, various voices	61 episodes

==== Theme parks ====
Year	Title	Role	Notes
2002–2010	Walt Disney World Railroad	Announcer	
2002–2016	Disneyland Railroad	Announcer	

== Awards and nominations ==
Year	Award	Category	Title	Result	Ref
2006	NAVGTR Awards	Best Supporting Performance in a Comedy	Psychonauts	Nominated	
2010	NAVGTR Awards	Best Supporting Performance in a Comedy	The Secret of Monkey Island (Special Edition)	Nominated	

== See also ==
- Terminator
- Monkey Island
- Voice acting
