= Shay Astar =

American actress, singer, and songwriter

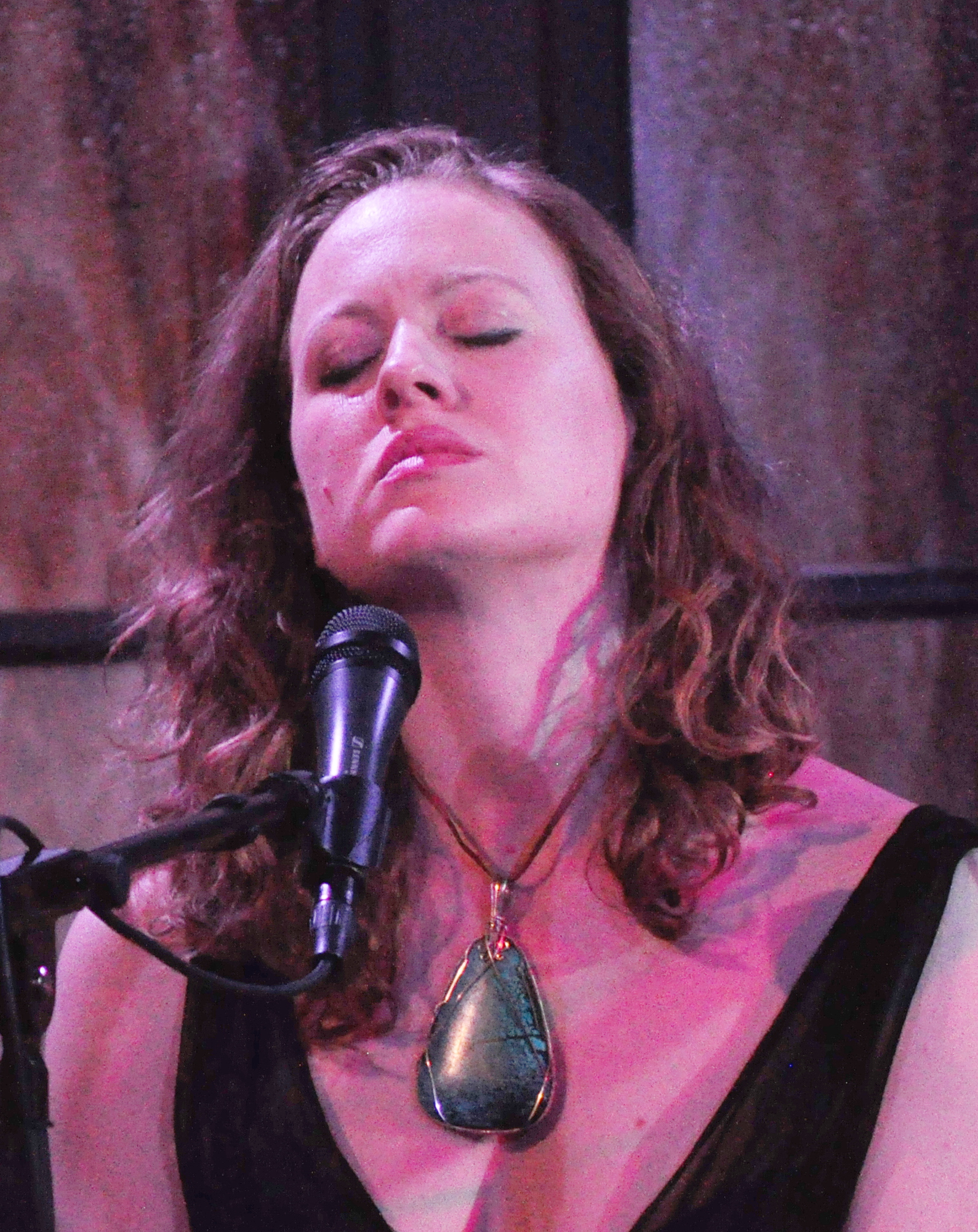
- Shay Astar, 2014
- Born: September 29, 1981 (age 44); Santa Cruz, California, U.S.
- Occupations: Actress, singer
- Years active: 1991–2014

Shay Astar (born September 29, 1981) is an American actress, singer, and songwriter best known for portraying the teenage feminist August Leffler, a semi-regular character on the sitcom 3rd Rock from the Sun.

== Career ==
Astar played Elizabeth in the Halloween comedy film Ernest Scared Stupid (1991), Paula Kelly in the Boy Meets World episode "I Am Not a Crook", and Isabella, the imaginary friend of a young girl aboard the Enterprise in the Star Trek: The Next Generation episode "Imaginary Friend" in 1992. In 1996, she voiced Andrea on the cartoon series The Oz Kids.

Astar released her first EP, Blue Music EP, on May 24, 2010. This was followed by her full-length debut, Blue Music on September 28, 2010.

== Filmography ==
=== Film ===
| Year | Title | Role | Notes |
|---|---|---|---|
| 1991 | Samantha | Young Samantha | |
| 1991 | Ernest Scared Stupid | Elizabeth | |
| 1996 | Virtual Oz | Andrea | Voice |
| 1996 | Toto Lost in New York | Andrea | Voice |
| 1996 | The Nome Prince and the Magic Belt | Andrea | Voice |
| 1996 | Who Stole Santa? | Andrea | Voice |
| 1996 | Christmas in Oz | Andrea | Voice |
| 1999 | Deal of a Lifetime | Peggy Doozer | |
| 2006 | The Lost | Jennifer Fitch | |
| 2006 | Rocker | Marie | |
| 2006 | Hookers Inc. | Apple Martinni | |
| 2007 | I Know Who Killed Me | Merribeth Hamblin | |
| 2010 | Boston Girls | Lynne | |
| 2011 | Bob's New Suit | Stephanie | |
| 2013 | All Cheerleaders Die | Ms. Wolf | |

=== Television ===
| Year | Title | Role | Notes |
|---|---|---|---|
| 1991 | Jake and the Fatman | Amanda | Episode: "We'll Meet Again" |
| 1991 | China Beach | Karen | 3 episodes |
| 1992 | Designing Women | Tiffany #2 | Episode: "I Enjoy Being a Girl" |
| 1992 | Star Trek: The Next Generation | Isabella | Episode: "Imaginary Friend" |
| 1993 | Quantum Leap | Mary Elroy | Episode: " A Tale of Two Sweeties" |
| 1993 | Rio Shannon | Bridget Cleary | Television film |
| 1994 | The Good Life | Melissa Bowman | 13 episodes |
| 1995 | Boy Meets World | Mindy Barnett / Paula Kelly | 2 episodes |
| 1995 | ER | Amy Thompson | Episode: "What Life?" |
| 1996 | Seduced by Madness | Girl #2 | Episode #1.2 |
| 1996 | The Oz Kids | Andrea (voice) | 26 Episodes |
| 1996–1999 | 3rd Rock from the Sun | August | 24 episodes |
| 2000, 2001 | Days of Our Lives | Mary Clarke | 2 episodes |
| 2005 | The Inside | Charlotte | Episode: "Loneliest Number" |
| 2008 | The Unit | Computer Hacker | Episode: "Into Hell: Part One" |
| 2009 | Cold Case | Courtney Gaines | Episode: "The Long Blue Line" |
| 2010 | Buffy the Vampire Slayer: Season 8 Motion Comic | Amy Madison | 6 episodes |
| 2011 | The Event | Sean's Sister | Episode: "Turnabout" |
| 2012 | La La Land | Shay | 3 episodes |
| 2014 | Shameless | Melanie | Episode: "Iron City" |
