= Where Silence Has Lease =

- Star Trek: The Next Generation episode
- "Nagilum" appears to the Enterprise bridge crew.
- Episode no.: Season 2 Episode 2
- Directed by: Winrich Kolbe
- Written by: Jack B. Sowards
- Cinematography by: Edward R. Brown
- Production code: 128
- Original air date: November 28, 1988

Guest appearances
- Earl Boen – Nagilum; Charles Douglass – Haskell; Colm Meaney – Transporter Chief

Episode chronology
← Previous "The Child"	Next → "Elementary, Dear Data"
- Star Trek: The Next Generation season 2

"Where Silence Has Lease" is the second episode of the second season of the American science fiction television series Star Trek: The Next Generation, the 28th episode overall. It was originally released on November 28, 1988, in broadcast syndication. Directed by Winrich Kolbe, it was written by Jack B. Sowards.

Set in the 24th century, the series follows the adventures of the Starfleet crew of the Federation starship Enterprise-D. In this episode, while enveloped by a void in space, the Enterprise crew is tested by a powerful alien presence.

== Plot ==
While on a charting mission, the Federation starship Enterprise, under the command of Captain Jean-Luc Picard, discovers a zone of pure blackness in space; probes launched into the area simply disappear. As they continually move closer to study it further, the zone expands and soon envelops the Enterprise, leaving them in a black void with sensors reporting nothing outside. Picard orders the ship on a return course but they find that they cannot escape. They leave a stationary beacon behind them, only to have it reappear ahead of them.

A Romulan Warbird suddenly decloaks in front of the ship and attacks. Picard orders the crew to return fire; they destroy the Warbird, but Picard is suspicious of how easily this occurs. The crew then detect what appears to be their sister ship, the USS Yamato, approaching them, but it does not respond to hails. Commander Riker and Lt. Worf beam over to search the ship, where they find it empty with various inconsistencies in its construction, including more seemingly impossible physical loops. The Enterprise then detects an exit from the darkness but cannot lock onto the away team to retrieve them before the opening disappears. The Yamato begins to fade away, but the Enterprise is able to beam Riker and Worf back just in time. More openings appear in the blackness, each closing as soon as the Enterprise approaches them. Picard realizes that they are being manipulated and orders a full stop.

An entity called Nagilum, appearing as a face, on the bridge viewscreen, announces its curiosity about humans has prompted it test the limits of the human body. After causing Ensign Haskell to die via intracerebral hemorrhage, it states that it wants to know everything about death. It estimates it will take between a third and a half of the crew to complete its experiments. Picard activates the ship's self-destruct sequence rather than to submit to Nagilum's whims. As the crew prepares for their end, Picard is tested once more by Nagilum via the peculiar behavior displayed by doppelgangers of Counselor Troi and Lt. Commander Data, both of whom question the self-destruct order. Once the duplicates are gone and the countdown nears zero, the void vanishes, leaving the Enterprise in normal space. Picard orders the ship to move away at high speed, but cancels the self-destruct only when he is satisfied that they are truly free.

As the Enterprise continues on its mission, Nagilum appears on the ready-room computer. It offers its dismissive evaluation of humanity. Picard disagrees, pointing out that their recent encounter shows that both species are curious. Nagilum concedes this point before disappearing.

== Trivia ==
- The character of Nagilum was originally named "Nagillum", after actor Richard Mulligan, whom the show's co-executive producer, Maurice Hurley, originally wanted cast in the role. "Nagillum" is "Mulligan" spelled backward.
- When Picard is approached by the doppelgängers of Troi and Data, he is listening to one of Erik Satie's compositions, Gymnopédie No. 1 (1888).
- The title of the episode is from the last stanza of a 1907 poem, "The Spell of the Yukon" by Robert W. Service.

== Reception ==
The A.V. Club compared the episode to the original Star Trek — "it's back to the God-like beings and technology-indistinguishable-from-magic storytelling" — and had mixed feelings about the episode putting a new spin on familiar ideas. Tor.com rated it 4 out of 10. Den of Geek recommended the episode, "Not just because it's a very Star Trek-y episode of Star Trek, but because it’s full of fun character moments and interesting direction."

In 2018, CBR ranked Nagilum as a strong character for Star Trek; in particular they note how it deceives yet also causes trouble for the crew of the Enterprise 1701-D. The appearance of the USS Yamato was also noted. (The Yamato and the Enterprise 1701-D are both Galaxy-class starships.)

In 2020, Screen Rant noted this as a frightening episode of Star Trek, elaborating, "... the audience were subjected to psychological stress in this season 2 episode."
