= I, Borg =

- Star Trek: The Next Generation episode
- Jonathan Del Arco in costume as Third of Five / Hugh
- Episode no.: Season 5 Episode 23
- Directed by: Robert Lederman
- Written by: René Echevarria
- Production code: 223
- Original air date: May 10, 1992

Guest appearances
- Whoopi Goldberg – Guinan; Jonathan Del Arco – Third of Five / Hugh

Episode chronology
← Previous "Imaginary Friend"	Next → "The Next Phase"
- Star Trek: The Next Generation season 5

"I, Borg" is the 23rd episode of the fifth season of the American science fiction television series Star Trek: The Next Generation, the 123rd overall. It was originally aired on May 10, 1992, in broadcast syndication. The episode was written by René Echevarria, with help from executive producer Jeri Taylor. It was directed by Robert Lederman, the film editor for The Next Generation, one of two directing credits he received during the course of the season.

Set in the 24th century, the series follows the adventures of the Starfleet crew of the Federation starship Enterprise-D. This episode revisits the Borg, a hostile alien group mind bent on assimilating all life into its collective consciousness. An injured Borg drone (Jonathan Del Arco) is found in the wreckage of a crashed ship. As they restore him to health, the crew must decide whether or not to develop him as a weapon of mass destruction against the Borg; when he demonstrates free will, choosing the name Hugh, they must question that decision.

The writers had problems bringing back the Borg due to their apparent near-invincibility. The idea for "I, Borg" was well received among the staff, with Taylor comparing it to the film Edward Scissorhands. The episode also saw a development in the make-up design for the Borg by Michael Westmore's team. Del Arco was deliberately antisocial prior to his audition to get into the role but also sought to use the innocence and wonderment generated by his partner's death as Hugh's voice. He was pleased when the character later returned in the two-part episode "Descent". The episode received Nielsen ratings of 12.8 percent and critics were positive with praise directed at both Del Arco and Whoopi Goldberg, as well as the general nature of the plot.

== Plot ==
The crew discover a wrecked Borg scout ship with a single survivor: a young Borg drone. Dr. Beverly Crusher (Gates McFadden) insists on treating the surviving Borg despite the concerns of Captain Jean-Luc Picard (Patrick Stewart). On Picard's orders, the drone is confined and monitored by security forces at all times and is prevented from contacting the Borg Collective. Chief Engineer Geordi La Forge (LeVar Burton) and Lt. Commander Data (Brent Spiner) assist Crusher in bringing the Borg back to health. As they come to understand the workings of the Borg, La Forge and Data devise an idea of using the Borg drone as a weapon of mass destruction. By implanting an unsolvable geometric formula into his mind and returning him to the Collective, the formula should rapidly spread (similar to a computer virus) and disable the Borg. Crusher is aghast at this suggestion, considering it equivalent to genocide, while Picard and the other senior crew deliberate on the ethics of this plan.

The Borg drone initially calls himself "Third of Five", but ends up referring to and understanding himself as "Hugh"—the name given to him by La Forge. Hugh discusses how the Borg only wish to learn about other cultures through assimilation, but La Forge counters this argument, discussing aspects of individuality that make them human and unique. In further debates, La Forge finds himself becoming a friend to Hugh, and begins to doubt his previous idea. This is further complicated when Hugh shows elements of individuality. The crew now debate whether it is appropriate to sacrifice one individual to protect the majority, though Picard is still insistent on destroying the Collective. La Forge invites Guinan (Whoopi Goldberg), who has a similar loathing for the Borg because they destroyed her homeworld, to speak to Hugh.

She finds Hugh to be not a mindless drone but a confused young man, and she agrees Hugh is no longer a Borg. Guinan convinces Picard to meet with Hugh, as well, and Picard comes to the same conclusion, in part because Hugh refers to himself as "I" instead of the Borg's collective "we" during their discussion. Picard abandons the proposed plan and instead offers Hugh asylum within the Federation. Hugh expresses enthusiasm at the prospect of remaining with La Forge but ultimately refuses, recognizing that the Borg will still come looking for him. He offers to be returned to the crash site, where he will be found and re-assimilated by the Borg. Picard hopes that, once Hugh is reconnected, the sense of individualism Hugh has learned will spread throughout the Collective. La Forge accompanies Hugh to the crash site and, from a safe distance, watches the Borg recover him. Just as the Borg transport out, Hugh turns to give La Forge a parting glance.

== Production ==
Following the Borg-based two-part episode "The Best of Both Worlds", the production team were having difficulty in introducing the Borg to the series due to their unstoppable nature. The story idea for "I, Borg" was well received by the production staff, with executive producer Rick Berman saying that he "fell in love" with the characterisations of Guinan, Picard, La Forge and Hugh which resulted in a series of two character scenes in the episode. Story editor René Echevarria wrote the script, with an uncredited assist from executive producer Jeri Taylor. She compared the idea to the film Edward Scissorhands (1990), saying that she felt it would become a "classic" and that the Borg "would never be the same again". Michael Piller, who wrote "The Best of Both Worlds", described "I, Borg" as having a "great premise which forces Guinan and Picard to face their own prejudices". He said it was his favourite of the season.

The episode was directed by Robert Lederman, his first of the series and the only new director during the fifth season. Lederman was also the film editor on the series, and later directed the episode "Force of Nature". "I, Borg" also marked the first time that Jay Chattaway scored a Borg-related episode; Chattaway continued to do so for the rest of the series and during Star Trek: Voyager.

=== Design and casting of Hugh ===
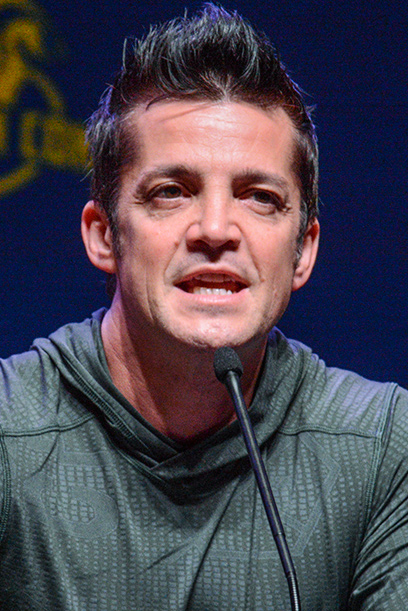
Jonathan Del Arco appeared as the individual Borg "Hugh" in "I, Borg".

The design of the Borg prosthetics as used in "I, Borg" was an evolution from those previously seen in the series. Michael Westmore's make-up team developed a removable eye-piece for Hugh, using magnets to allow the actor to remove it as required by the script. The team wanted the eye-piece to be dramatic, but decided against using a laser as this had been previously used for Locutus of Borg. They instead opted for a hologram and a series of LEDs that were powered by a battery pack built into the costume and mounted on the actor's back. The arm piece was also redeveloped; rather than a single "club" piece as previously used for the Borg, it was built from a foam-rubber glove with attachments.

Jonathan Del Arco had no concept of what a Borg was prior to the audition. He received his script on the evening prior to meeting with the producers and felt that it gave him a decent sense of the character. Instead, Del Arco later explained that he was deliberately antisocial towards the other actors at the audition in order to get into Hugh's mindset. When he performed for the producers, someone else read the lines assigned to Picard and La Forge, and he felt like he immediately got a positive result. He received a call back, and returned to audition once more. He had previously done a screen test for the role of character Wesley Crusher.

He said that his performance in "I, Borg" was driven by the memories of watching a childhood friend die, and the innocence that he felt given to his friend's memory over time; "When I first read the script. I heard his voice, that's what it sounded like—full of wonderment and confusion about everything. That, to me, was Hugh." In 2020, he clarified that his performance was driven by watching his partner, Eddie, develop dementia and then die from AIDS soon before his audition. "I opened the script and I heard his voice. As it turns out, the voice was the voice of my previous partner who had died of AIDS and had dementia. I don’t know why, but that was the voice I heard. It was the innocence. It was the wonder." "My partner had died of AIDS and I was alone. He’s who I played, initially. I’ve talked about that before."

Following his appearance in the episode, he later pitched a couple of story ideas to the producers to feature the return of Hugh. He was happy when the character later returned in the seventh season opener "Descent", which he felt was similar to his previous ideas. Del Arco later reprised the character in the first season of Star Trek: Picard.

== Reception ==
The episode aired during the week commencing May 10, 1992, in broadcast syndication. According to Nielsen Media Research, it received ratings of 12.8 percent. This means that it was watched by 12.8 percent of all households watching television during its timeslot. When broadcast it was the seventh most watched episode of the season, behind both parts of "Unification", "A Matter of Time", "Power Play", "Cause and Effect" and "The Game".

Keith DeCandido in his review for Tor.com gave the episode a score of eight out of ten, and described Goldberg's appearance as "particularly good", while Del Arco was said to be "spectacular" in his "subtle, powerful performance". DeCandido criticised the "defanging" of the Borg, but understood why the writers took the approach they did, as a near-unstoppable enemy is difficult to write for. He praised the characterisations, specifically for Crusher, and added that "it’s never a bad thing when TNG actually remembers its character continuity". James Van Hise, in his book The Complete Trek: The Next Generation, said that the episode "enriched the creative tapestry of the series" and gave the writers a number of possibilities for following it up.

Zack Handlen gave "I, Borg" a grade of A− in his review for The A.V. Club, and while he was disappointed that the Borg were made less "nightmarish", the question of genocide that hung over the episode and the expansion of potential story ideas from the plot made it worth it.

In a SyFy review of 25 greatest science fiction episodes between 1992 and 2017, "I, Borg" was the only Star Trek episode selected, although this excluded any episodes before 1993 or so.

Empire ranked this the 34th best out of the top 50 episodes of the 700 plus Star Trek television episodes.

Screen Rant ranked "I, Borg" the sixth best episode of Star Trek: The Next Generation. Variety ranked it as the 13th best episode of Star Trek: The Next Generation. The Hollywood Reporter ranked it among a top twenty five episodes of Star Trek: The Next Generation. Sven Harvey included "I, Borg" in a list of 25 "must watch" episodes of the series compiled for Den of Geek, describing it as "a wonderfully written and executed episode which lays a path for later developments".

Newsweek noted this episode for emergence of independent identity, and of empathy and forgiveness. They remarked: "As the Borg, cut off from the collective mind, begins to recognize itself as an individual, so do Picard and Guinan."

Forbes noted this episode as exploring the implications of advanced technology, showing how an isolated Borg alien must learn how to be an individual.

Den of Geek ranked Jonathan Del Arco as in Star Trek: The Next Generation as one of the top ten guest star roles on Star Trek: The Next Generation. He appears in the role of Third of Five (i.e. Hugh), in "I, Borg" and "Descent, Part II".

=== Watch guides ===
The Nerdist included this episode as part of a story arc of this TV show. They proposed a story arc with the Enterprise 1701-D confronting the Borg, that would include "Q Who?", "The Best of Both Worlds", "I, Borg" and "Descent".

SyFy Wire recommended this episode for binge-watching, noting how the episode introduces the recovering Borg 'Hugh' played by Jonathan Del Arco.

== Home media release ==
"I, Borg" was first released on VHS cassette in the United States and Canada on October 7, 1997. The episode was later released in the United States on November 5, 2002, as part of the season five DVD box set. It was subsequently released as part of the Star Trek: Fan Collective – Borg collection on DVD, which brought together the Borg-themed episodes from The Next Generation, Star Trek: Voyager and Star Trek: Enterprise. The first Blu-ray release was in the United States on November 19, 2013, followed by the United Kingdom on November 18.

== See also ==
- "Descent", episode where some of the Borg drones gain individuality as a result of reintegrating Hugh
- "Child's Play", the Voyager episode in which an ex-drone is almost used as a weapon
- "Scorpion, Part II" (introducing Seven of Nine) and "Collective", two Voyager episodes in which Borg are liberated from the collective
- "BLIT", a story that uses images with effects similar to the weapon Hugh was proposed to carry
