= Calvin Marshall =

- Theatrical release poster
- Directed by: Gary Lundgren
- Written by: Gary Lundgren
- Produced by: Mark Cunningham; Anne Lundgren; Michael Matondi
- Starring: Alex Frost; Steve Zahn; Jeremy Sumpter; Michelle Lombardo
- Cinematography: Patrick Neary
- Edited by: Gary Lundgren
- Music by: John Askew
- Production company: Broken Sky Films
- Distributed by: Gravitas Ventures
- Release dates: October 23, 2009 (Austin); August 20, 2010 (United States)
- Running time: 93 minutes
- Country: United States
- Language: English

Calvin Marshall is a 2009 coming of age-comedy film written and directed by Gary Lundgren and starring Alex Frost as the title character, a determined but talentless college baseball player, and Steve Zahn as his coach. After two years of raising funds, the film was shot in and around Ashland and Medford, Oregon in November–December 2007, and was released in 2009.

== Plot ==
Calvin Marshall is a charismatic student at Bayford City College. When he tries out for the baseball team for the third straight year, ex-minor leaguer Coach Little is exasperated by Calvin's persistence despite Marshall's lack of baseball skills. Determined to make the team, Calvin wins Little over with pure heart and love of the game.

While rehabilitating during an injury, Calvin announces games for the Lady Bisons volleyball team and is entranced by their star, Tori. Preoccupied with caring for her sick mother and more interested with meaningless flings, Tori is unsure what to make of Calvin's advances.

== Cast ==
- Alex Frost as Calvin Marshall
- Steve Zahn as Coach Doug Little
- Jeremy Sumpter as Caselli
- Michelle Lombardo as Tori Jensen
- Cynthia Watros as Karen
- Andrew Wilson as Ernie
- Jane Adams as June Marshall
- Abraham Benrubi as Coach Dewey
- Josh Fadem as Simon
- Rosie Thomas as Sondra
- Diedrich Bader as Fred Deerfield
- Darwin Barney as Murphy

== Production ==
Production company Broken Sky Films was started by Gary Lundgren, Anne Lundgren, Michael Matondi, and Mark Cunningham in 2000, and its first production was Gary Lundgren's short film "Wow and Flutter". Cunningham had planned to fund Calvin Marshall, but did not have the money to create the company's first full-length feature film. They hired a casting director, Christine Sheaks, who successfully sought out Steve Zahn for the part of Coach Little. Over the two years it took to raise enough money, a number of financiers pulled out but Zahn's promised participation attracted further sponsorship.

Calvin Marshall began filming on November 11, 2007 in Ashland, Oregon. Line producer Gary Kout said that Ashland was chosen as a filming location because "the setting of the film [is] fictitious and Ashland has a timeless feel to it and creates a beautiful backdrop." The Lady Bisons volleyball scenes were filmed at Southern Oregon University's McNeal Pavilion and gymnasium, with around 200 extras standing in as supporters in the stands. North Mountain Park's softball fields were used for several of the scenes in the film. Other locations included city streets and local homes in Ashland, the Whiskey River Cafe and Lounge in Central Point and the Rogue Valley Family Fun Center in Central Point; between US$400,000 and $500,000 was spent on filming permits for public places. Production moved to Medford, Oregon where locations included the Harry and David Baseball Park. Principal photography concluded on December 15, 2007.

== Release ==
Calvin Marshall premiered at the Austin Film Festival in October 2009.

== Awards ==
David Raines, Mark Server, and Kent Romney were nominated for "Outstanding Achievement in Sound Mixing, DVD Original Programming" for Calvin Marshall at the Cinema Audio Society Awards in 2011.

== See also ==
- List of baseball films
