= Alex Frost =

American actor

- Occupation: Actor
- Years active: 2003–present

Alex Frost is an American actor best known for his roles in Elephant and Drillbit Taylor.

== Education and career ==
Frost attended high school at the Arts & Communication Magnet Academy in Beaverton, Oregon. He grew up playing piano.

Frost had a starring role in Gus Van Sant's 2003 film Elephant, in which he played a high school student who commits a school shooting. The film was set in Frost's hometown of Portland, Oregon, with the director avoiding Hollywood actors in order to find real local teenagers. Frost's musical experience was a key factor in him auditioning for the role.

Since Elephant, Frost has worked on a number of films, including The Queen of Cactus Cove, The Lost and The Standard. He appeared in a Season 3 episode of NCIS entitled "Ravenous". He played the primary antagonist in the Owen Wilson movie Drillbit Taylor, released on March 21, 2008, by Paramount Pictures. He appeared in two films in 2009, Calvin Marshall and The Vicious Kind. He appeared in The Wheeler Boys, premiered in the 2010 LA Film Festival.

In September 2023, Frost signed with Brave Artists Management for representation.

== Filmography ==
=== Film ===
| Year | Title | Role | Notes |
|---|---|---|---|
| 2003 | Elephant | Alex | |
| 2005 | Queen of Cactus Cove | Achak | |
| 2006 | The Lost | Tim Bess | |
| 2006 | The Standard | Dylan | |
| 2008 | Stop-Loss | Shorty | |
| 2008 | Drillbit Taylor | Filkins | |
| 2009 | The Vicious Kind | Peter Sinclaire | |
| 2009 | Calvin Marshall | Calvin Marshall | |
| 2010 | Almost Kings | Truck | |
| 2010 | Virginia | Josh Tipton | |
| 2014 | Flight 7500 | Jake | |
| 2015 | See You in Valhalla | Peter | |
| 2016 | Soy Nero | Beverly Hills Police Officer | |
| 2017 | The Most Hated Woman in America | Danny Fry | |

=== Television ===
| Year | Title | Role | Notes |
|---|---|---|---|
| 2006 | NCIS | Jerry | Episode: "Ravenous" |
| 2010 | Good Morning Rabbit | Boxer | Episode: "National Hamburger Day" |
