= The Lost (2006 film) =

- Directed by: Chris Sivertson
- Written by: Chris Sivertson
- Produced by: Lucky McKee; Chris Sivertson; Koko Poovey
- Starring: Marc Senter; Shay Astar; Alex Frost; Michael Bowen
- Cinematography: Zoran Popovic
- Edited by: Chris Sivertson
- Music by: Tim Rutili
- Production company: Silver Webb Productions
- Distributed by: Anchor Bay Entertainment
- Release dates: March 12, 2006 (SXSW); February 11, 2008 (United States)
- Running time: 119 minutes
- Country: United States
- Language: English

The Lost is a 2006 American psychological horror film that was written and directed by Chris Sivertson based on the Jack Ketchum novel of the same name, which in turn was inspired by the true story of serial killer Charles Schmid. It was produced by Lucky McKee. The film stars Marc Senter as charismatic teen sociopath Ray Pye. Senter won best actor awards from both Screamfest and Fantaspoa film festivals. He was also nominated for a Fangoria Chainsaw Award. Supporting cast include Shay Astar, Alex Frost, Michael Bowen, and Robin Sydney. The movie had its world premiere at the SXSW Film Festival with a limited theatrical release following shortly after.

== Synopsis ==
Nineteen-year-old Ray Pye decides to murder two young women. His friends, Jen and Tim, witness the murder and help him cover it up.

Four years later, Ray has never been arrested for the crime. Detective Charlie Schilling and his ex-partner, Ed Anderson, know that Ray did it but they could not prove it. Charlie figures it is about time they did something about it. Meanwhile, Ray has met his match in Katherine Wallace, a new girl in town. She and Ray are a potentially explosive combination. Throw in the fact that Ed is having a summer fling with Sally Richmond—a girl young enough to be his daughter. And Sally has just gotten a job at the motel that Ray manages. Ray has his eye on her.

Charlie and Ed never found the gun that Ray used to murder the women at the campground. That rifle, as well as a handgun, are hidden behind the mirror in Ray's bathroom. Ray can only be pushed so far. The time will come when he takes the mirror off the wall and shows everyone who is in charge.

== Cast ==
- Marc Senter as Ray Pye
- Shay Astar as Jennifer Fitch
- Alex Frost as Tim Bess
- Michael Bowen as Detective Charlie Schilling
- Robin Sydney as Katherine Wallace
- Megan Henning as Sally Richmond
- Ed Lauter as Ed Anderson
- Katie Cassidy as Dee Dee
- Dee Wallace as Barbara Hanlon
- Erin Brown as Lisa Steiner
- Ruby Larocca as Elise Hanlon
- Tom Ayers as Eddie
- Tony Carreiro as Tom Wallace
- Cynthia Cervini as Etta
- Rob Elk as Lenny Bess
- Cornelia Guest as Katherine's Mom
- Alice Hirson as Mrs. Griffith
- Jesse Hlubik as Officer Shack
- Jack Ketchum as Teddy Panik
- Cristiana Ladki as Tonianne Primiano
- Mike McKee as Mr. Griffith
- Shelli Merrill as Liz Wellman
- Tony Moras as Roger
- Belle Morte as Carla
- Linda Pine as Country Club Waitress
- Richard Riehle as Bill Richmond
- Helen Siff as Jane Pye
- Eddie Steeples as Stevie-Ray
- Justin Stone as Ken Wellman
- Luke Y. Thompson as Handsome Country Club Patron
- Trevor Graciano as Ray's Friend
