= Imaginary Friend (Star Trek: The Next Generation) =

- Star Trek: The Next Generation episode
- Episode no.: Season 5 Episode 22
- Directed by: Gabrielle Beaumont
- Story by: Jean Louise Matthias; Ronald Wilkerson; Richard Fliegel
- Teleplay by: Edithe Swensen; Brannon Braga
- Production code: 222
- Original air date: May 4, 1992

Guest appearances
- Noley Thornton - Clara Sutter; Shay Astar - Isabella; Jeff Allin - Daniel Sutter; Brian Bonsall - Alexander Rozhenko; Patti Yasutake - Alyssa Ogawa; Sheila Franklin - Felton; Whoopi Goldberg - Guinan

Episode chronology
| ← Previous "The Perfect Mate" | Next → "I, Borg" |
- Star Trek: The Next Generation season 5

"Imaginary Friend" is the 22nd episode of the fifth season of the American science fiction television series Star Trek: The Next Generation, the 122nd episode overall.

Set in the 24th century, the series follows the adventures of the Starfleet crew of the Federation starship Enterprise-D. In this episode, a child's "imaginary" playmate threatens the well-being of the Enterprise.

== Plot ==
Clara Sutter, a girl who just moved to the Enterprise with her Ensign-father Daniel, is lonely, so she creates an imaginary friend named Isabella to keep her company. One day, to her surprise, her imaginary friend appears, and seems real (though she makes herself invisible before adults see her). Increasingly, Isabella gets Clara into trouble by leading her into off-limit places, prompting Clara to leave her to go play with others. When Clara returns, Isabella is angry and says, "When the others get here, you can die like everyone else."

Counselor Troi, trying to ease Clara's fears of being attacked by Isabella, helps to search the girl's room to ensure she's safe. Isabella appears and blasts Troi with an energy beam from her hand. Later, in sickbay, she relates the event, and Clara works up the courage to tell her father, who then talks to Captain Picard.

The crew learns that Isabella is actually an energy-based life form whose home is the nebula the ship has been exploring. Picard finds Isabella in the arboretum and talks to her about human parenting. Isabella argues that the adults are cruel to Clara and deserve to die. He asks what she bases that conclusion on, and she says it's their treatment of Clara. He asks in what way they've mistreated her, and she lists their refusal to allow her access to certain areas of the ship. Picard explains that rules are for her protection and that Isabella is viewing them through the eyes of a child, which - from that perspective - would definitely seem unfair. However, they didn't know that Clara's imaginary friend was now real, and was there to protect her. All they knew was that two children were in potentially dangerous areas of the ship, and - as good responsible adults - it was their job to keep them safe. He speaks of how one day Clara will be an adult and she will have rules for her children, and they will be for the same reason. Isabella is convinced, and allows the ship to pass safely through the nebula.

As the ship is preparing to leave the area, Isabella appears to Clara a final time to apologize and ask if they'll ever see each other again. Clara is unsure, but she promises to try and return someday - albeit probably when she is an adult.

== Reception ==
Fatherly listed this episode as a recommended watch for parents and children noting that it highlights childhood friendship and loneliness.

== Production ==
Noley Thornton, who portrayed Clara Sutter in this episode, appeared two years later as Taya in the Star Trek: Deep Space Nine episode "Shadowplay."

== Releases ==
The episode was released in the United States on November 5, 2002, as part of the season five DVD box set. The first Blu-ray release was in the United States on November 18, 2013, followed by the United Kingdom the next day, November 19, 2013.
