= Zero Bridge (film) =

- Directed by: Tariq Tapa
- Written by: Tariq Tapa
- Produced by: Hilal Ahmed Langoo; Josee Lajoie
- Starring: Mohamad Imran Tapa; Taniya Khan; Ali Mohammad Dar
- Edited by: Josee Lajoie; Tariq Tapa
- Release date: August 2008 (Venice)
- Running time: 96 minutes
- Country: India
- Languages: Urdu; Kashmiri

Zero Bridge is a 2008 Kashmiri drama film written and directed by Tariq Tapa, starring Mohamad Imran Tapa, Taniya Khan and Ali Mohammad Dar. It is Tapa's feature directorial debut.

== Cast ==
- Mohamad Imran Tapa
- Taniya Khan
- Ali Mohammad Dar
- Owaise Qayoom Bhat
- Burhan Qadfir
- Afrooza Langoo

== Release ==
The film premiered at the 2008 Venice Film Festival.

== Reception ==
The film has a 77% rating on Rotten Tomatoes. Scott Tobias of The A.V. Club graded the film a C+. Bill Weber of Slant Magazine awarded the film two and a half stars out of four.

The Hollywood Reporter gave the film a positive review and wrote, "Rough hewn neo-realist drama from India has its sociological fascinations."

== Nominations ==
At the 25th Independent Spirit Awards, Tapa was nominated for the Someone to Watch Award and the film was nominated for the Independent Spirit John Cassavetes Award.
