= Drillbit Taylor =

2008 comedy film by Steven Brill

- Theatrical release poster
- Directed by: Steven Brill
- Screenplay by: Kristofor Brown; Seth Rogen
- Story by: Edmond Dantès; Kristofor Brown; Seth Rogen
- Produced by: Judd Apatow; Susan Arnold; Donna Arkoff Roth
- Starring: Owen Wilson; Leslie Mann; Danny McBride; Josh Peck
- Cinematography: Fred Murphy
- Edited by: Brady Heck; Thomas J. Nordberg
- Music by: Christophe Beck
- Production companies: Apatow Productions; Roth/Arnold Productions
- Distributed by: Paramount Pictures
- Release date: March 21, 2008
- Running time: 102 minutes
- Country: United States
- Language: English
- Budget: $40 million
- Box office: $49.7 million

Drillbit Taylor is a 2008 American coming-of-age comedy film directed by Steven Brill, produced by Judd Apatow, Susan Arnold and Donna Arkoff Roth with screenplay by Kristofor Brown and Seth Rogen based on an original story by John Hughes (under the pseudonym "Edmond Dantès", his final film work and credit before his death one year later). In the film, three high school pupils decide to hire an adult bodyguard to protect them from two bullies who endlessly harass and abuse them.

The film stars Owen Wilson as the eponymous role, alongside Nate Hartley, Troy Gentile, David Dorfman (his final film role before his retirement), Alex Frost, Josh Peck and Leslie Mann in supporting roles.

Drillbit Taylor was released by Paramount Pictures on March 21, 2008. Upon release, the film grossed $49.7 million against a $40 million budget and received negative reviews, with criticism directed mainly toward the screenwriting, the direction and the mean-spirited nature, but praised the humor, Wilson's performance and the chemistry between the cast.

== Plot ==
On the first day of high school, freshmen Wade and Ryan witness bullies Terry Filkins and Ronnie attack geek Emmit, stuffing him into his locker. Wade interferes, leading the two to continuously focus their bullying on Wade and Ryan, as well as Emmit, whom Wade and Ryan become friends with; the rest of the students are too afraid to step in, worried they might also become targets, and the principal will not take any action since Filkins is an emancipated minor whose parents are in Hong Kong (also, Filkins frequently acts innocent).

After Filkins threatens to kill the trio for attempting to report him, Wade suggests hiring a bodyguard. They place an ad on the Internet, and after many disturbing interviews with ex-cons and hired guns, they end up selecting Drillbit Taylor. Drillbit pretends to be a martial arts expert and mercenary but is really a homeless beggar, whose real intention is to rob them and use the money to buy a ticket to Canada.

Drillbit suggests they find common interests with Filkins and Ronnie. Ryan challenges Filkins to a rap battle but gets carried away and ends up unintentionally humiliating him. Furious, Filkins, alongside Ronnie, ambushes the trio. Trying out a tactic Drillbit taught them ultimately fails. The boys decide to bring him to school as a substitute teacher, and in that capacity he manages to protect them. While there, Drillbit meets teacher Lisa Zachey, and they start a sexual relationship.

One morning as his mother is driving him to school, Ronnie sees Drillbit showering at the beach; his mother reveals that he is homeless, and that she is one of many he asks for money frequently. Filkins finds the boys and punches Drillbit. Later, at Wade's, they catch Drillbit's homeless friends stealing everything in sight. Drillbit confesses that his real name is Bob; he went AWOL from the U.S. Army and his name was Drillbit because he hurt his pinky finger in high school with a drillbit.

The boys fire Drillbit, who later recovers all of Wade's possessions and places them back before Wade's parents return home. However, the boys accidentally let the truth slip about Drillbit. Their parents take things up with the principal, who contacts the police. Filkins plays innocent and charms all the adults, then continues to ridicule the boys after Drillbit's disappearance. Tensions finally burst when Filkins interrupts Wade's attempt to ask out his crush, Brooke Nguyen. Having enough of his bullying, Wade challenges Filkins to a fight. Ryan offers to join in, but Emmit refuses to help them.

Wade and Ryan arrive at Filkins' house, where he is hosting a party; initially, the duo put up a good fight, but Filkins and Ronnie soon overpower them. Emmit, who has a change of heart, comes to their aid and for a while causes a lot of pain to Filkins, almost defeating him; but Ronnie knocks him out while he is trying to break Filkins' leg.

Drillbit shows up and Filkins punches him. Drillbit refuses to fight back until it is revealed Filkins is actually 18 and not a minor. Hearing this, Drillbit begins fighting and cleans Filkins's clock within seconds. He does not attack Ronnie when he reveals he is only 17. Within minutes, the police arrive and Drillbit flees for fear of prosecution. Filkins then throws a samurai sword at the boys in retaliation. Drillbit returns and catches it with his left hand, saving them, but loses half his pinkie finger. When they interview him, Ronnie reveals to the police that Filkins had bullied him into being his accomplice.

The police take Filkins to the ground, arrest him, and deport him to Hong Kong to be with his parents instead of facing imprisonment for violating underage drinking laws and attempted murder. Wade, with renewed confidence, asks Brooke out and she accepts, while Ryan finally accepts Emmit and declares him a friend. The three are now popular since they stood up to Filkins.

Drillbit is arrested for desertion but is released within three weeks. He is reunited with Lisa and the boys and soon starts working as a nurse at their school. Later, (Note: In a post-credits scene.) a student visits the nurse's office to report bruises from a recent beating. Drillbit asks for the name of the student and assures him that he will be safer from then on.

== Cast ==
- Owen Wilson as Drillbit Taylor
- Leslie Mann as Lisa
- Nate Hartley as Wade
- Troy Gentile as Ryan
- David Dorfman as Emmit
- Alex Frost as Terry Filkins
- Josh Peck as Ronnie
- Danny McBride as Don
- Stephen Root as Principal Doppler
- Lisa Ann Walter as Delores
- Ian Roberts as Jim
- Beth Littleford as Barbara

In addition, Valerie Tian plays Brooke, the girl Wade is sweet on, while cameo appearances include standup comics Kevin Hart and Lisa Lampanelli, the film's director, Steven Brill, and "bodyguard candidates" that include Israeli Defence Force martial arts expert and Israel's Heavyweight Full Contact Champion Amir Perets, UFC Light Heavyweight Champion Chuck Liddell, and Adam Baldwin, who makes a dismissive reference to the plot of his 1980 film My Bodyguard.

== Marketing ==
Marketing for the movie included television promos and coming attractions previews, but actor Owen Wilson did not conduct any interviews to promote the film. Instead, Paramount Pictures had Wilson record introductions for Fox's Sunday night primetime shows such as The Simpsons, American Dad!, King of the Hill, Family Guy, and Unhitched. The character of Drillbit was also featured as a "Superstar" on the RAW page of WWE.com for a period of time. Wilson's publicist said his availability was limited due to filming Marley & Me.

John Horn and Gina Piccalo of the Los Angeles Times wrote that the reason for Wilson's limited promotional schedule was due to studio executives being worried that interviewers would bring up Wilson's hospitalization for severe depression in the summer of 2007.

== Reception ==
=== Box office ===
In its opening weekend, the film grossed $10.2 million in 3,056 theaters in the United States and Canada, ranking #4 at the box office. The film has grossed $32,862,104 in the United States and $16,828,521 in other countries adding to a total worldwide gross of $49,690,625.

=== Critical response ===
On Rotten Tomatoes the film has an approval rating of 26% based on reviews from 146 critics, with an average rating of 4.5/10. The site's consensus states: "Owen Wilson's charms can't save Drillbit Taylor, an unfunny, overly familiar bullied-teen comedy." On Metacritic the film has a score of 41 out of 100 based on reviews from 31 critics, indicating "mixed or average" reviews. Audiences surveyed by CinemaScore gave the film a grade B on scale of A to F.

=== Home media ===
The film was released on both rated (102 minutes) and unrated (109 minutes) DVD and Blu-ray on July 1, 2008. About 620,927 units have been sold, bringing in $11,669,617 in revenue.

== See also ==
- My Bodyguard - 1980 film with a similar premise
