= The Vicious Kind =

2009 film by Lee Toland Krieger

- Theatrical release poster
- Directed by: Lee Toland Krieger
- Written by: Lee Toland Krieger
- Produced by: Tim Harms; Lindsay Lanzillotta; Lee Toland Krieger
- Starring: Adam Scott; Brittany Snow; Alex Frost; J. K. Simmons
- Cinematography: Bradley Stonesifer
- Edited by: Regino Roy III
- Music by: Jeff Cardoni
- Production companies: 72nd Street Productions; Candleridge Entertainment
- Distributed by: 72nd Street Productions
- Release dates: January 17, 2009 (Sundance); December 11, 2009 (Los Angeles)
- Running time: 92 minutes
- Country: United States
- Language: English

The Vicious Kind is a 2009 American comedy-drama film written, directed, and co-produced by Lee Toland Krieger. It stars Adam Scott, Brittany Snow, Alex Frost, and J. K. Simmons. It follows a misanthropic man who tries to warn his brother away from the new girlfriend he brings home during Thanksgiving, but ends up becoming infatuated with her in the process.

The film had its world premiere at the Sundance Film Festival on January 17, 2009, and was given a limited theatrical release in Los Angeles, California on December 11, 2009, by 72nd Street Productions. It received positive reviews from critics, who praised the performances of the cast (particularly Scott) and dialogue. At the 25th Independent Spirit Awards, it earned two nominations: Best Male Lead (for Scott) and Best Screenplay (for Krieger).

== Plot ==
Peter is an idealistic college student on Thanksgiving break, and his older brother Caleb is begrudgingly giving him a ride home. At school, Peter has found a new girlfriend, Emma Gainsborough, and Caleb immediately grills him for details. We find out that Emma and Peter met while Emma was dating another fraternity boy. Despite this, Peter says she's a "good girl" while Caleb immediately perceives her to be a "whore."

Caleb is immediately antagonistic to Emma, but they eventually arrive at the home of the boys' father, Donald. Caleb drops them off, but not before revealing to Emma that he and Donald do not get along and that this will be the last time he will see them this weekend. Donald comes off as well-meaning, if somewhat crude and flirtatious.

Caleb has been having difficulty sleeping, and whenever he tries to sleep he keeps seeing images of his ex-girlfriend, Hannah, who behaves and looks strikingly similar to Emma. Hannah has been continuously calling Caleb without speaking, so he drops off pictures of himself having sex with a prostitute at her doorstep, ringing the bell and fleeing.

Caleb runs into Emma twice over the next two days, once at the bowling alley and again at the grocery store. He ends up physically and verbally attacking her, and threatens her not to hurt Peter, who is a good kid (and a virgin). Moments later, he breaks down, begging for her forgiveness.

That night, Emma sees Caleb trying to sneak around the yard with a camera. Emma wants an explanation about what happened earlier. Caleb goes into his belief on what he heard about her at school, his girlfriend Hannah who cheated on him, and his lack of sleep, which has further muddled his actions and behavior. Caleb eventually leaves, feeling better after these confessions.

The next morning, Emma asks Donald about Peter's mother, and he reveals that she died when Caleb and Peter were young. Donald also says that his wife cheated on him prior to being diagnosed with cancer and that no one visited her in her final months. At work, Caleb reveals he managed to fall asleep for a few minutes the night before.

Caleb, Peter and Emma go to a restaurant together. During a moment alone, Caleb assures Emma that he doesn't have feelings for her before forcibly kissing her. Emma says nothing about it to Peter. Caleb privately warns Peter to watch Emma carefully, because she's been eyeing him. Peter says he's in love with her and wants to give her his virginity, and Caleb laughs at the idea. Caleb apologizes for his ideas that she was a whore.

While Peter and Emma prepare to have intercourse, Peter reveals that what Donald told her is true, except that Caleb was the only one to see their mother before she died, and Caleb and Donald haven't spoken since. Caleb visits his prostitute, and asks her if it's normal to be in love with a perceived image of someone, even if that's not who they really are (likening Emma to Hannah). He then asks if she was abused as a child, which offends her. Caleb loses his temper, then comes back and gives her a better tip, implying that his perception and treatment of women is evolving.

Caleb tries apologizing to Emma for kissing her and says he'll try not to bother her anymore. Emma reveals she has accidentally locked herself out of the house, and Caleb manages to get them both inside through a window. Emma falls on top of Caleb, and they seem like they might be about to kiss before she rebukes him and asks him never to see her again. Caleb leaves, and Emma returns to the place where they embraced to masturbate.

At a bar, Caleb's co-worker JT asks him if he's had sex with Emma yet, and he says no, but he wants to. He spots some men sexually harassing a woman and ends up fighting them, marking another change in him.

Peter tries to have sex with Emma but ejaculates prematurely. Caleb drives over to see Emma, and this time, she doesn't rebuke him when he kisses her, and eventually, they end up having passionate sex in Caleb's old room.

Emma asks why Caleb was the only one to see his mother before she died. He reveals he was hurt by her cheating, and shut her out of his life. However, he eventually discovered that Donald had been the one cheating until his wife finally left, never thinking that he would refuse to let her see her sons. Caleb never told Peter because he was only 12. Emma tells Caleb she was a virgin. Caleb leaves, shocked at what he did, and reminds Emma that Peter is in love with her. On his way out, he runs into his father who deduces what happened and says he'll tell Peter. Caleb calls him a coward for erasing him out of his life. They both hide as Peter goes to Emma's room, and Caleb dictates to Donald that he won't tell Peter what he did, otherwise he'll tell him Donald's secrets and he'll lose both his sons. Peter and Emma sleep together, and he loses his virginity to her.

The next morning, Donald drives them to the train station. On the way, Peter tells Emma he loves her, but it causes Emma to cry. Donald confesses to Peter that he's made mistakes, and that sometimes, people know what they are doing is wrong but they do it anyway, because the right thing is painful. The two of them alone again, Caleb rings Donald's doorbell and Donald invites him in, their relationship beginning to mend at last.

== Cast ==
- Adam Scott as Caleb Sinclaire
- Brittany Snow as Emma Gainsborough
- Alex Frost as Peter Sinclaire
- J. K. Simmons as Donald Sinclaire
- Vittorio Brahm as J.T.
- Bill Buell as Rocky
- Alysia Reiner as Samantha
- Kate Krieger as Molly
- Jordan Reid Berkow as Hannah

== Release ==
The Vicious Kind premiered in the Spectrum section of the 25th Sundance Film Festival on January 17, 2009. It was released in select theaters in Los Angeles on December 11, 2009 and in New York City on February 12, 2010.

== Reception ==
=== Critical response ===
On the review aggregator website Rotten Tomatoes, 70% of 10 critics' reviews are positive, with an average rating of 6.2/10. Metacritic, which uses a weighted average, assigned the film a score of 65 out of 100, based on 4 critics, indicating "generally favorable" reviews.

Manohla Dargis of The New York Times stated, "Despite the film's occasional unforced moments, the characters spend far too much time working through their problems with drama-deadening directness. By the time a late act of betrayal occurs, followed by an even less persuasive denouement, the truth of this world has drained away." Peter Knegt of IndieWire wrote, "There are unexpected, uneasy laughs from start to finish as well as a cast of unlikable characters. Krieger's risks fail as often as they succeed. As a result, Vicious Kind is overly melodramatic and extreme." Justin Chang of Variety opined, "Before it bogs down in one too many moments of cathartic reckoning, The Vicious Kind is an unpredictable, off-kilter and scabrously funny piece of work." Frank Scheck of The Hollywood Reporter commented, "Krieger's scabrous dialogue and incisive characterizations consistently sustain interest, and the performers provide intriguingly complex layers to their characters. Scott and Snow are the obvious standouts, but Frost and Simmons are equally fine in their less showy roles." Gary Goldstein of the Los Angeles Times remarked, "Featuring a knockout performance by Adam Scott, The Vicious Kind upends the heavily tread dysfunctional family drama in ways that are unique, surprising and memorable." Kyle Smith of the New York Post wrote, "Scott's performance is much more interesting that the indie film's story line" and "Krieger and Scott come up with a caustic anti-hero worthy of being played by Jack Nicholson in the 1970s."

=== Accolades ===
The Vicious Kind was nominated for Best Male Lead (for Scott) and Best Screenplay (for Krieger) at the 25th Independent Spirit Awards. In 2009, it won several awards at film festivals around the world, including Scott for Best Actor at the Strasbourg International Film Festival and at the Sidewalk Moving Picture Festival, Krieger for Emerging Filmmaker at the Denver Film Festival, and Best Feature at the New Orleans Film Festival.
