= The Child (Star Trek: The Next Generation) =

- Star Trek: The Next Generation episode
- Episode no.: Season 2 Episode 1
- Directed by: Rob Bowman
- Written by: Jaron Summers; Jon Povill; Maurice Hurley
- Cinematography by: Edward R. Brown
- Production code: 127
- Original air date: November 21, 1988

Guest appearances
- Seymour Cassel – Hester Dealt; Whoopi Goldberg – Guinan; R. J. Williams – Ian Andrew Troi; Colm Meaney – Transporter Chief; Dawn Arnemann – Miss Gladstone; Zachary Benjamin – Young Ian; Dore Keller – Crewman

Episode chronology
← Previous "The Neutral Zone"	Next → "Where Silence Has Lease"
- Star Trek: The Next Generation season 2

"The Child" is the first episode of the second season of the American science fiction television series Star Trek: The Next Generation, the 27th episode overall. It was originally released on November 21, 1988, in broadcast syndication. The story was originally written by Jaron Summers and Jon Povill for the cancelled late 1970s series Star Trek: Phase II. Due to the tight deadlines caused by the 1988 Writers Guild of America Strike, the producers of The Next Generation searched the records of that earlier television project, resulting in the script being amended by showrunner Maurice Hurley.

Set in the 24th century, the series follows the adventures of the Starfleet crew of the Federation starship Enterprise-D. In this episode, ship Counselor Deanna Troi (Marina Sirtis) becomes pregnant by an alien entity and gives birth to a mysterious child. This causes problems for the Enterprise, which is transporting dangerous plague strains. The child's presence on the ship begins to endanger the crew, due to effects on a virus sample being transported by the ship. It sacrifices its physical body, turning back into an energy being, telling Troi why it visited before departing.

Being the first episode of the second season, "The Child" was the first episode to feature Diana Muldaur as Doctor Katherine Pulaski and Whoopi Goldberg as Guinan. It is also the first appearance of Ten Forward and the episode to have Geordi LaForge and Worf wearing Operations Gold and William Riker sporting a beard. Director Rob Bowman was allowed to use additional camera equipment to improve the style of filming, resulting in a change to the opening shot of the episode. It was watched by 10.9 million viewers, but critics held a negative opinion of the episode, saying that there was no ongoing effect to Troi. Further criticism also compared the means of the character's pregnancy to rape, and stated that the reactions of the other crew members were irrational.

== Plot ==
The new Chief Medical Officer, Dr. Katherine Pulaski (Diana Muldaur), is brought aboard the Enterprise as it prepares to travel to Aucdet IX in order to take on dangerous virus samples, which will be carried to a Starfleet Medical station, hoping they will be able to devise a cure for a plague epidemic in the Rachelis System. After taking aboard the new doctor, the ship is traveling at sub-light speed when a ball of energy passes in through the hull, eventually settling in the womb of Counselor Deanna Troi (Marina Sirtis). Captain Jean-Luc Picard (Patrick Stewart) wonders why the new doctor hadn't checked in with him, and locates her in the Ten Forward lounge, where the bartender, Guinan (Whoopi Goldberg), works. Picard finds Doctor Pulaski talking with Troi about her unexpected pregnancy. The senior officers meet to discuss the pregnancy. The fetus is developing at an accelerated rate and would be fully developed in 36 hours. Troi does not know who the father is, but was aware of a "presence" entering her body the night before. Though the senior staff debate terminating the pregnancy, Troi decides she will carry the child to term.

The Enterprise arrives at Aucdet IX to pick up the plague samples, which are stored in a highly secure storage vessel. Troi gives birth to an apparently normal boy, whom she names Ian Andrew after her father. Ian continues to develop rapidly; within a day, he appears as a four-year-old child with corresponding mental faculties. When asked if he is ready to explain who or what he is, Ian responds "not yet." Having completed the transfer of the virus samples, the Enterprise heads for the Starfleet Medical station. En route, the crew finds one of the plague strains is growing inexplicably; should it continue growing, it will rupture the storage vessel and result in the catastrophic exposure of all on board.

They discover that an unknown source of Eichner radiation is causing the growth. Ian (R. J. Williams), now appearing as an eight-year-old, confides to Troi that he is the source of the crew's problems and will have to leave. Troi realizes Ian is dying and calls for medical assistance. Ian dies in Troi's arms and returns to his energy form. The energy being contacts Troi's mind, and explains that he impregnated her in order to discover what it was like to be human. With Ian gone, the plague sample returns to normal and the crew continues on their mission.

Meanwhile, Wesley Crusher (Wil Wheaton) has been trying to cope with leaving the Enterprise to join his mother on Earth after her promotion to director of Starfleet Medical. After receiving guidance from Guinan, he decides he wants to remain on the Enterprise.

== Production ==
=== Phase II ===
The origins of an episode based on a female crew member becoming pregnant first materialized in Gene Roddenberry's initial pitch for Star Trek: The Original Series. Entitled "Infection", the episode was described as "A female crew member is discovered to be pregnant, and the growing realization it could be the larvae of an alien, using her body like some insects plant their eggs in other living insects." A similar idea was created for the television series Star Trek: Phase II in the late 1970s. Jaron Summers pitched a premise for "The Child" in a meeting with Jon Povill, Roddenberry's assistant, and producer Harold Livingston. Povill suggested changes in the meeting, and Summers subsequently submitted a revised draft treatment. Livingston asked Povill to rewrite it, and he did a complete rewrite in the space of a week. Livingston was subsequently so impressed with his efforts that he demanded Roddenberry make Povill story editor. Roddenberry refused, until Livingston threatened to quit if Povill didn't get the job. This changed Roddenberry's mind, but Livingston found that it seriously damaged their working relationship.

The story would have seen the Deltan, Ilia (Persis Khambatta), becoming pregnant by an alien entity as the ship passed near a nebula. She gives birth to a baby girl, whom she names Irska. The Enterprise suffers multiple near-disasters, which are each resolved by the intervention of the child. Meanwhile, the ship's hull is slowly dissolving and the vessel will break apart in a matter of hours. The new Vulcan science officer Xon (David Gautreaux) mind melds with the child and discovers that it needs to be transported directly into a bright light which had been pursuing the Enterprise. This procedure is completed and as the child enters the light, it transforms into a higher life form. The episode ends with the crew musing that Ilia acted as the being's first womb and the Enterprise was the second. The series was cancelled as it went into initial production for the pilot, "In Thy Image", with that being rewritten as Star Trek: The Motion Picture. The script for the Phase II version of "The Child" was later reprinted in full in Judith and Garfield Reeves-Stevens' book Star Trek: Phase II: The Lost Series (1997). Povill and Summers adapted the script for use in the fan-series Star Trek: Phase II, also known as Star Trek: New Voyages. Povill also directed the episode.

=== The Next Generation ===
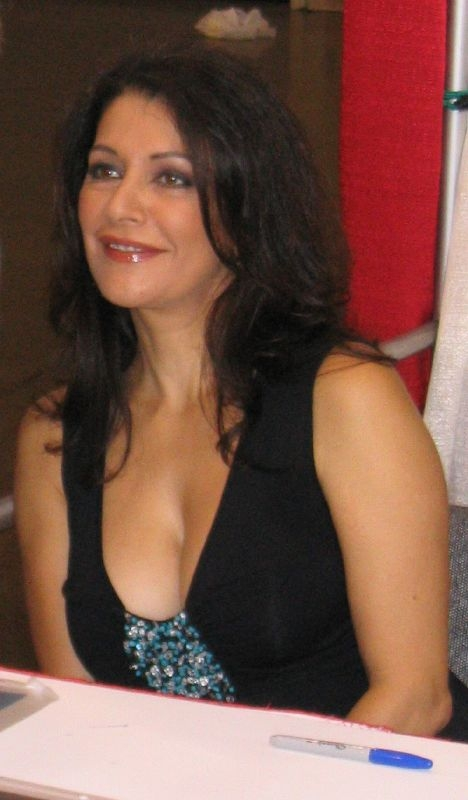
Marina Sirtis (pictured) was pleased with the episode as she felt her character was overlooked during the first season.

In response to the success of the first season, Paramount Television increased the budget per episode for Star Trek: The Next Generation, but also changed the financing structure so that funds could be carried over from episode to episode. But due to the 1988 Writers Guild of America strike, the work on the second season was delayed and the length of it overall was reduced. The producers sought to go into production immediately upon the strike being lifted, so they studied the story ideas put forward as part of Phase II. "The Child" was held up as one possibility, with the position of Ilia in the story changed to become Troi. Sirtis praised this development, as she felt she had been overlooked during the first season due to the presence of both Gates McFadden and Denise Crosby.

Showrunner Maurice Hurley later admitted that he had never looked at the Phase II script, while executive producer Rick Berman later explained that the writers did not have as much time to redevelop the script due to the restricted time-scale imposed by the strike. Despite this, director Rob Bowman wanted to give the fans of the series a good episode to start the second season, the idea of which Berman agreed with. So Bowman said that his direction "went a bit further" than he would normally in order to compensate for the script difficulties. He was allowed to use additional cameras and equipment to improve the style of filming, including the opening shot of the episode.

Making their first appearances on The Next Generation in "The Child" were Diana Muldaur as Doctor Katherine Pulaski and Whoopi Goldberg as Guinan. Muldaur had previously appeared in episodes of The Original Series as other characters, and had been written in to replace Gates McFadden. Officially, McFadden had chosen to leave as she didn't like her character development, the same reason given for Crosby departing during the first season. However, she had actually been fired by Hurley. It had been intended for Pulaski to bring more of a Doctor Leonard McCoy vibe to the series. Meanwhile, Academy Award nominee Goldberg had been actively pursuing a role on the series, as Nichelle Nichols' portrayal of Uhura on The Original Series had inspired her to become an actress. Her agent was initially ignored by the producers, as they did not believe that she wanted to be on the series until Goldberg called them herself. Her character was named after Mary "Texas" Guinan, a prohibition-era speakeasy owner.

== Reception ==
"The Child" was released in broadcast syndication on November 18, 1988. It was watched by 10.9 million viewers, the highest for the series since the first season episode "Too Short a Season", broadcast on February 14 of the same year. Dennis McCarthy's composition for this episode was nominated for the Primetime Emmy Award for Outstanding Music Composition for a Series in 1989.

In 1995, the episode was described as "uneven" and an "inauspicious start to the second season" by James Van Hise and Hal Schuster in their book The Complete Trek: The Next Generation. They praised the addition of Muldaur and Goldberg, but the lack of a follow-up to the episode was criticised as they felt that the events should have had some type of lasting effect on Troi. It was suggested that either she would want to have a child, or she would be wary of them in general due to the impact of the loss of Ian. Keith DeCandido pointed out several changes at the start of this season in "The Child" that would recur throughout the rest of the run of The Next Generation in his review for Tor.com. These included moving Geordi La Forge to become chief engineer, placing Miles O'Brien as transporter chief and Riker growing a beard. However, he criticised the fact that Worf's calling for Troi to have an abortion was never mentioned again, but added that it was discussed in a non-canonical novel, A Rock and a Hard Place by Peter David.

In 2013, James Hunt, in his review for Den of Geek, was surprised that no one in the episode reacted to Troi undergoing what he saw as a form of rape. He also felt that her eagerness to have the child could have been a type of mind control, but none of the crew seem to consider that as a possibility. He said that the crew failed to act rationally for the sake of the plot, which was one of his pet peeves in television, adding that you could "replace any main character in this episode with a parsnip and the outcome will be unchanged." Hunt also described the introduction of new elements as "clunky", feigning "wonder" that "someone doesn't say 'Nice facial hair, beardo' to Riker because that's the level of subtlety they go for." Zack Handlen, in a 2010 review of the episode for The A.V. Club gave it a grade of D+, criticising not only the introduction of Pulaski but also the passive nature of Troi, equating her pregnancy to rape. The entire life of the child was presented as a "joyous life experience", and Handlen described the lack of issues in a three-day pregnancy as "bunk". He felt that the episode would have been better served by concentrating on the hard science fiction concept of the plasma plague, which was only used as a macguffin.

In 2019, ScreenRant ranked it the 5th worst episode of Star Trek: The Next Generation based on IMDb ratings, which was 5.8 out of 10 at that time.

In 2020, Syfy highlighted this episode for the character of Troi, noting how it gives her a "dramatic moments of crisis" rather than having to more typically offer advice to others, along with "The Loss". They said this was a great performance by Marina Sirtis, but that it was not their favourite episode with her.

== Home media release ==
The first home media release of "The Child" was on VHS cassette, appearing on August 25, 1994, in the United States and Canada. The episode was later included on the Star Trek: The Next Generation season two DVD box set, released in on May 7, 2002. The season two Blu-ray set was released on December 4, 2012.
