= 25th Independent Spirit Awards =

US film awards ceremony in 2010

- Awarded for: Best in independent film
- Date: March 5, 2010
- Site: Santa Monica Pier; Santa Monica, California, U.S.
- Hosted by: Eddie Izzard

Highlights
- Best Feature: Precious
- Most awards: Precious (5)
- Most nominations: Precious (5); The Last Station (5)

The 25th Independent Spirit Awards, honoring the best independent films of 2009, were presented on March 5, 2010. The nominations were announced on December 1, 2009. The ceremony was hosted by Eddie Izzard.

== Winners and nominees ==
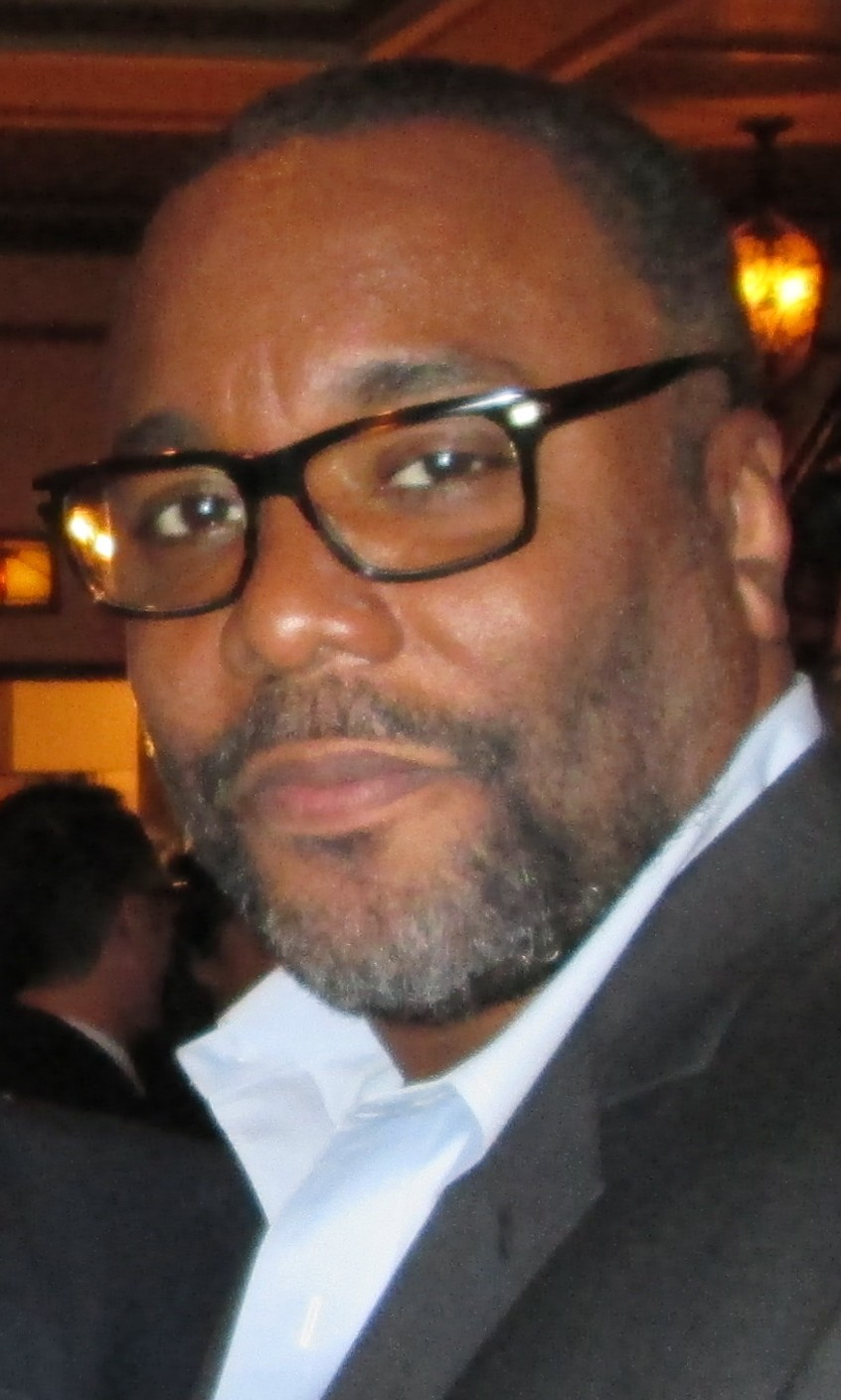
Lee Daniels, Best Director winner

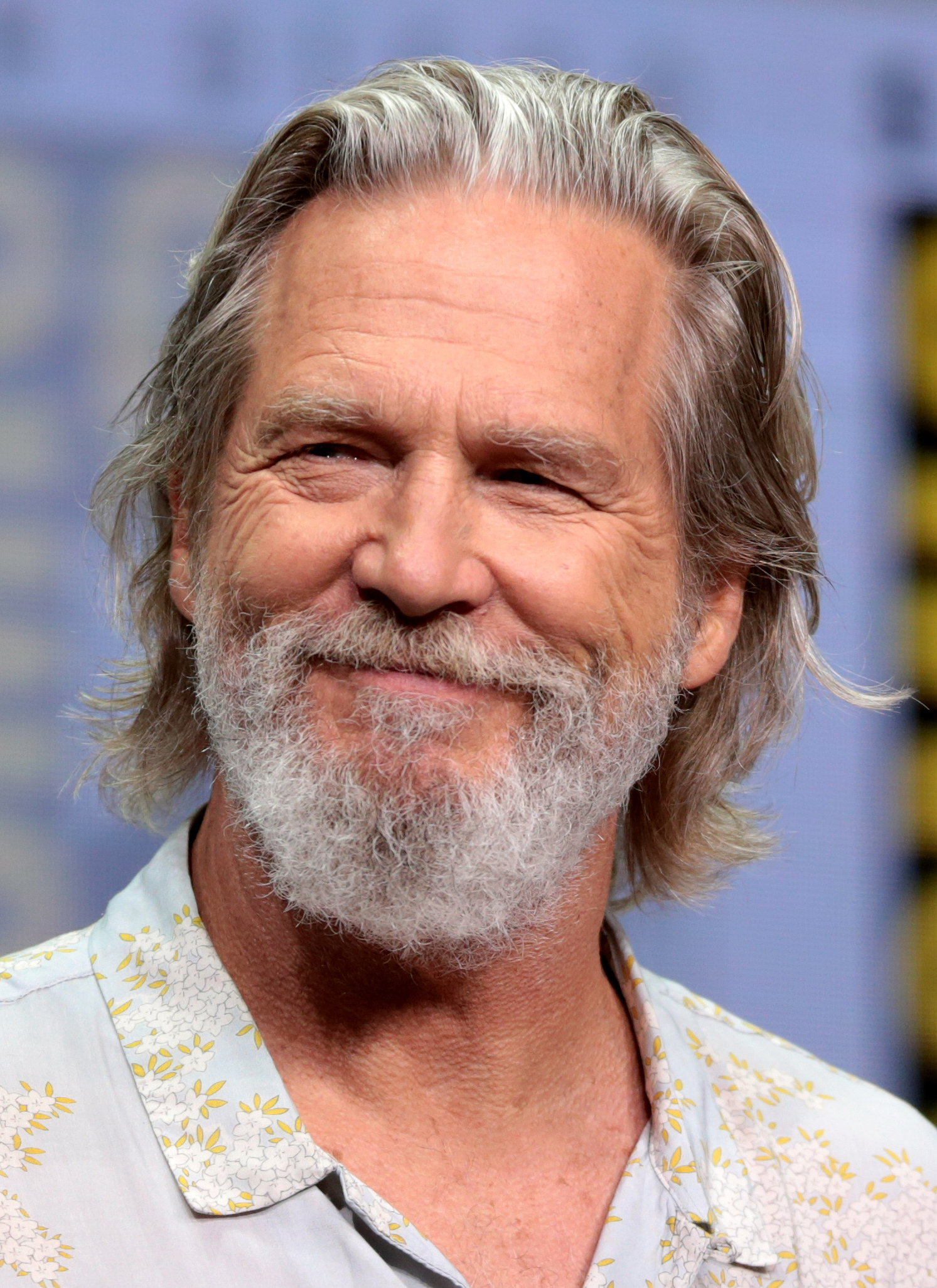
Jeff Bridges, Best Male Lead winner

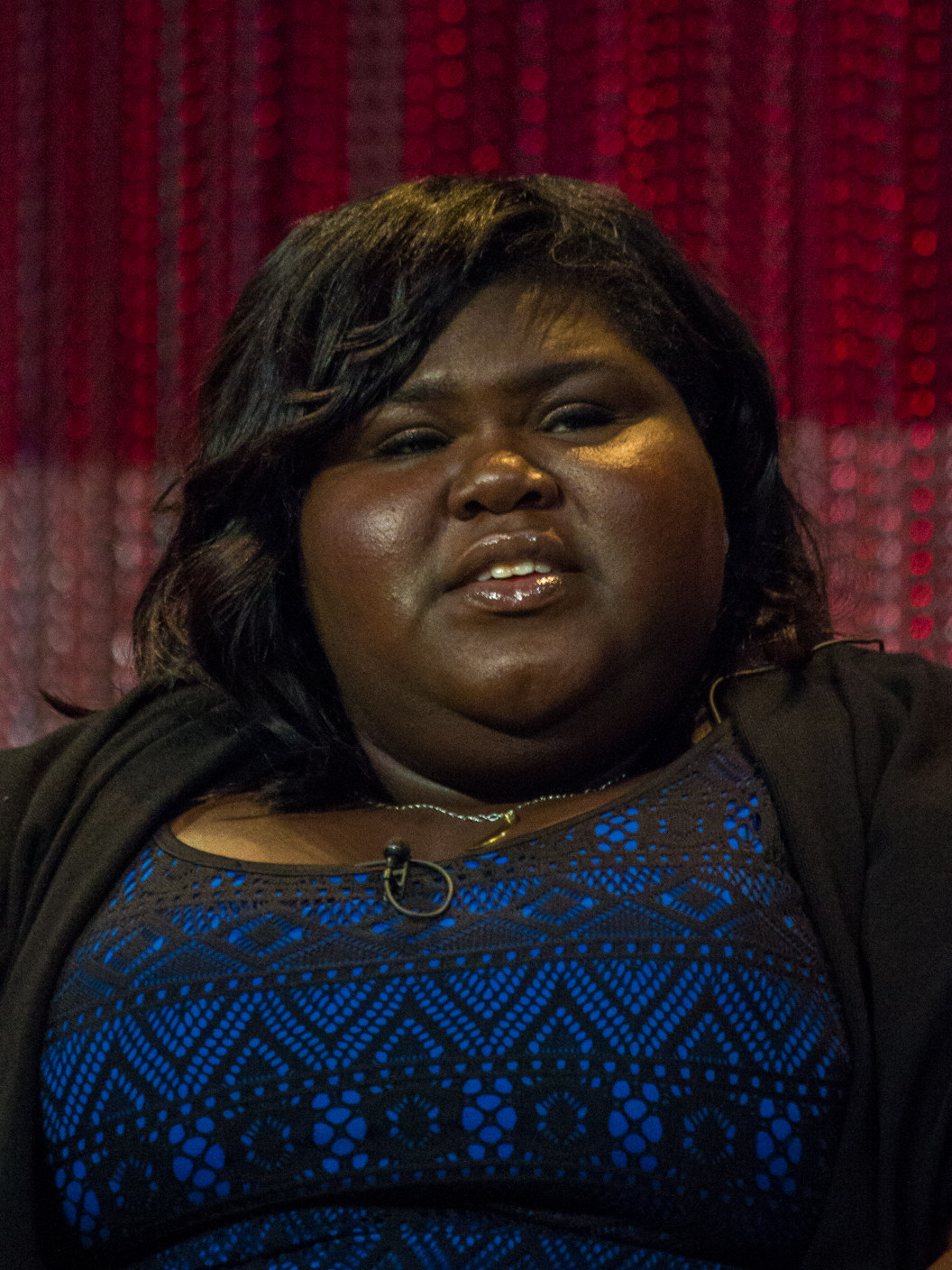
Gabourey Sidibe, Best Female Lead winner

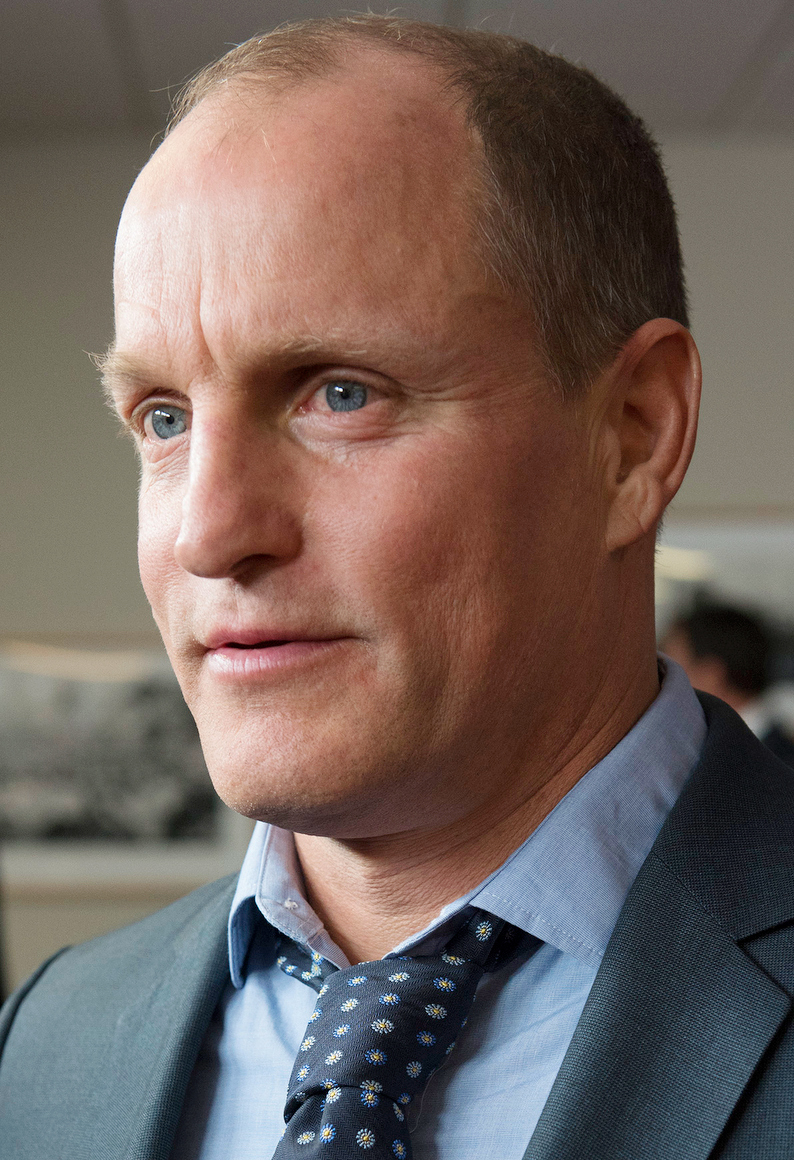
Woody Harrelson, Best Supporting Male winner

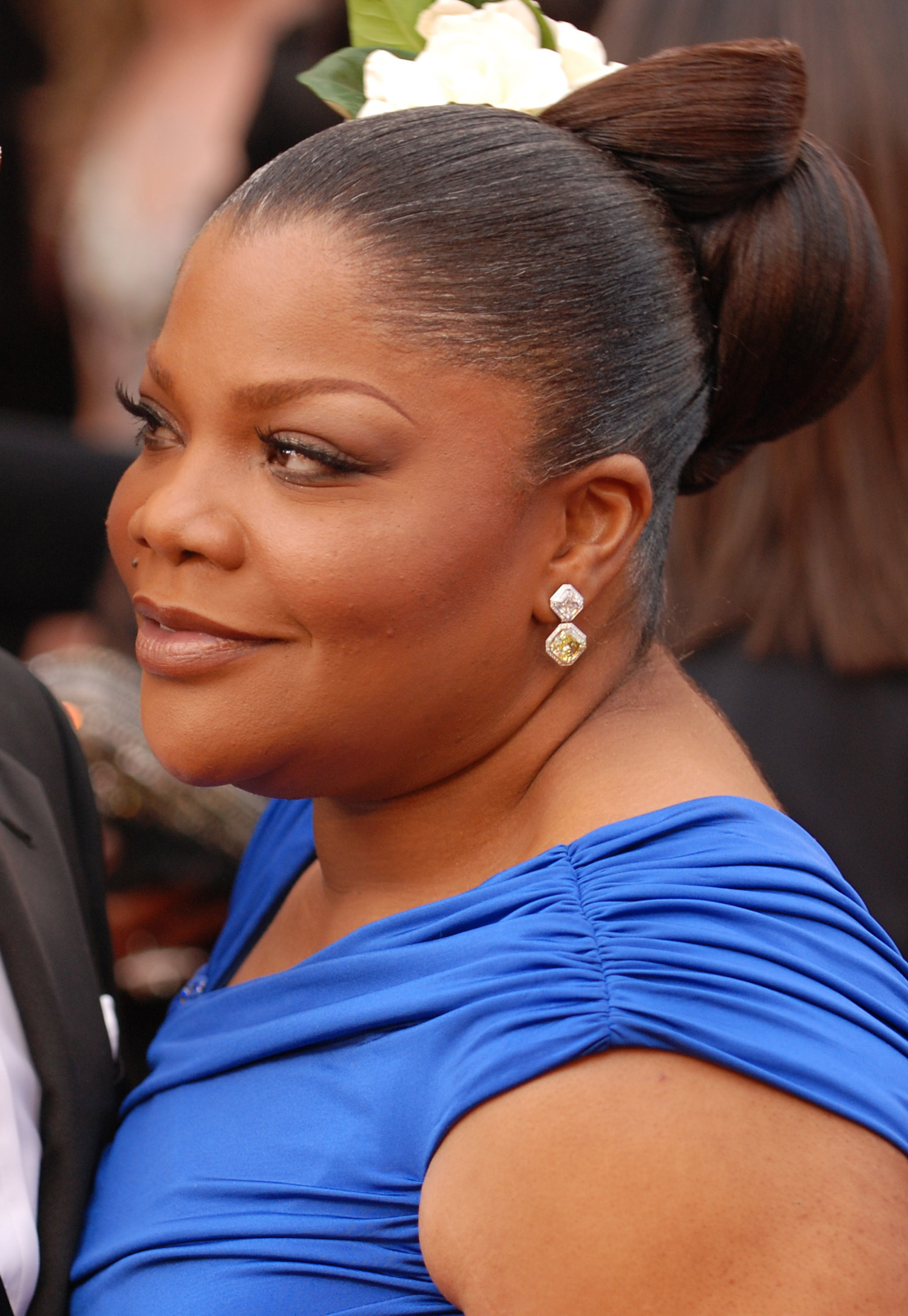
Mo'Nique, Best Supporting Female winner

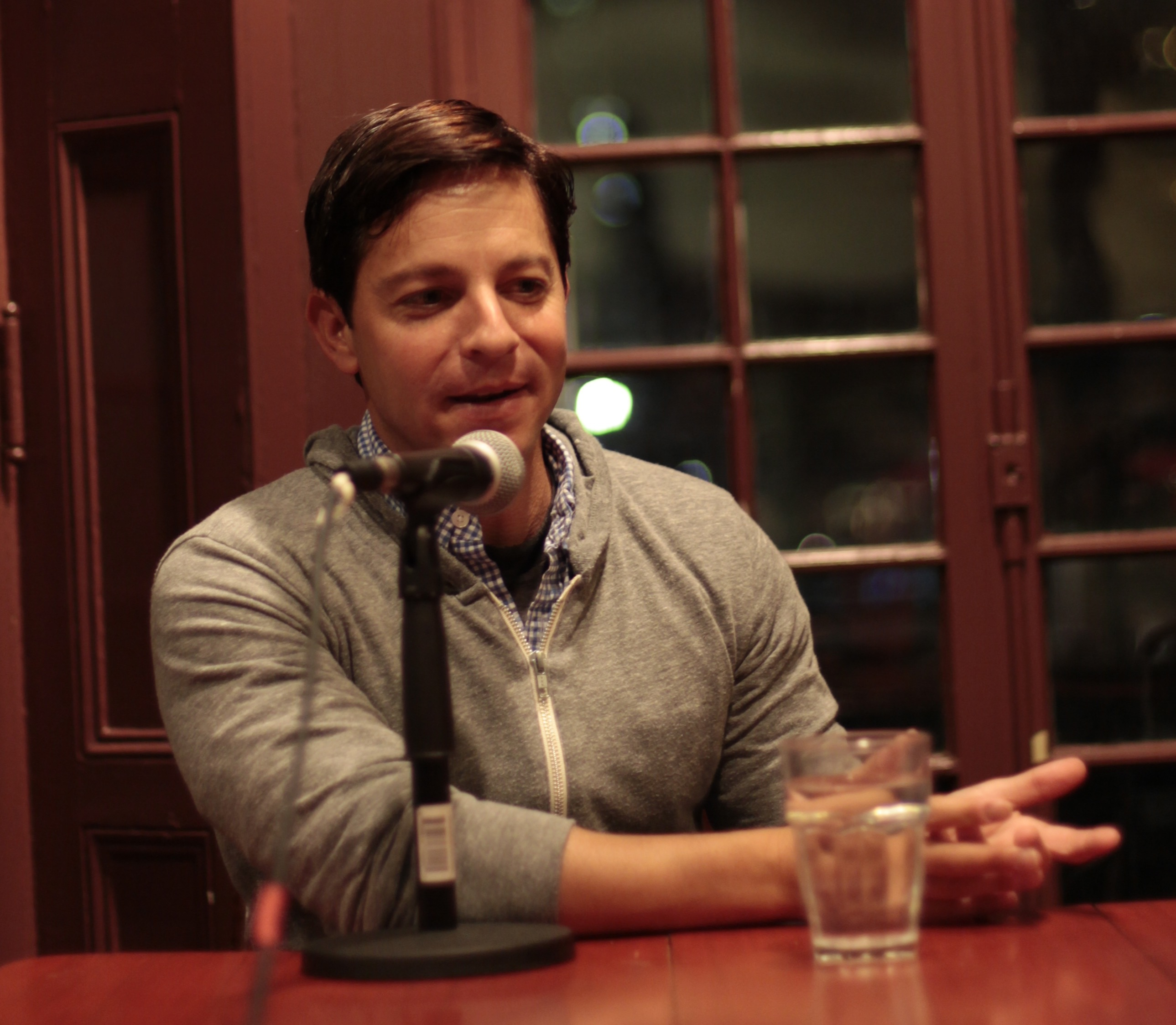
Scott Neustadter, Best Screenplay co-winner

Best Feature	Best Director
Precious: (500) Days of Summer; Amreeka; The Last Station; Sin nombre	Lee Daniels – Precious: Joel Coen and Ethan Coen – A Serious Man; Cary Joji Fukunaga – Sin nombre; James Gray – Two Lovers; Michael Hoffman – The Last Station
Best Male Lead	Best Female Lead
Jeff Bridges – Crazy Heart: Colin Firth – A Single Man; Joseph Gordon-Levitt – (500) Days of Summer; Souléymane Sy Savané – Goodbye Solo; Adam Scott – The Vicious Kind	Gabourey Sidibe – Precious: Maria Bello – Downloading Nancy; Nisreen Faour – Amreeka; Helen Mirren – The Last Station; Gwyneth Paltrow – Two Lovers
Best Supporting Male	Best Supporting Female
Woody Harrelson – The Messenger: Jemaine Clement – Gentlemen Broncos; Christian McKay – Me and Orson Welles; Ray McKinnon – That Evening Sun; Christopher Plummer – The Last Station	Mo'Nique – Precious: Dina Korzun – Cold Souls; Samantha Morton – The Messenger; Natalie Press – Fifty Dead Men Walking; Mia Wasikowska – That Evening Sun
Best Screenplay	Best First Screenplay
Scott Neustadter and Michael H. Weber – (500) Days of Summer: Alessandro Camon and Oren Moverman – The Messenger; Michael Hoffman – The Last Station; Lee Toland Krieger – The Vicious Kind; Greg Mottola – Adventureland	Geoffrey Fletcher – Precious: Sophie Barthes – Cold Souls; Scott Cooper – Crazy Heart; Cherien Dabis – Amreeka; Tom Ford and David Scearce – A Single Man
Best First Feature	Best Documentary
Crazy Heart: Easier with Practice; The Messenger; Paranormal Activity; A Single Man	Anvil! The Story of Anvil: Food, Inc.; More than a Game; October Country; Which Way Home
Best Cinematography	Best Foreign Film
Roger Deakins – A Serious Man: Adriano Goldman – Sin nombre; Anne Misawa – Treeless Mountain; Andrij Parekh – Cold Souls; Peter Zeitlinger – Bad Lieutenant: Port of Call New Orleans	An Education • France / UK: Everlasting Moments • Sweden; The Maid • Chile; Mother • South Korea; A Prophet • France

=== Films with multiple nominations and awards ===
Films that received multiple nominations
Nominations	Film
5	The Last Station
5	Precious
4	The Messenger
3	(500) Days of Summer
3	Amreeka
3	Cold Souls
3	Crazy Heart
3	Sin nombre
3	A Single Man
2	A Serious Man
2	That Evening Sun
2	Two Lovers
2	The Vicious Kind

Films that won multiple awards
Awards	Film
5	Precious
2	Crazy Heart

== Special awards ==
=== John Cassavetes Award ===
Humpday

- Big Fan
- The New Year Parade
- Treeless Mountain
- Zero Bridge

=== Truer Than Fiction Award ===
45365

- Beetle Queen Conquers Tokyo
- El General

=== Piaget Producers Award ===
Karin Chien – The Exploding Girl and Santa Mesa

- Larry Fessenden – The House of the Devil and I Sell the Dead
- Dia Sokol Savage – Beeswax and Nights and Weekends

=== Someone to Watch Award ===
Kyle Patrick Alvarez – Easier with Practice

- Asiel Norton – Redland
- Tariq Tapa – Zero Bridge

=== Robert Altman Award ===
- A Serious Man – Ethan Coen, Joel Coen, Ellen Chenoweth, Rachel Tenner, Richard Kind, Sari Lennick, Jessica McManus, Fred Melamed, Michael Stuhlbarg, and Aaron Wolff
