= 2018 Master Sommelier exam cheating scandal =

Allegations that some candidates were tipped off to wines tasted

Wine varietals at issue

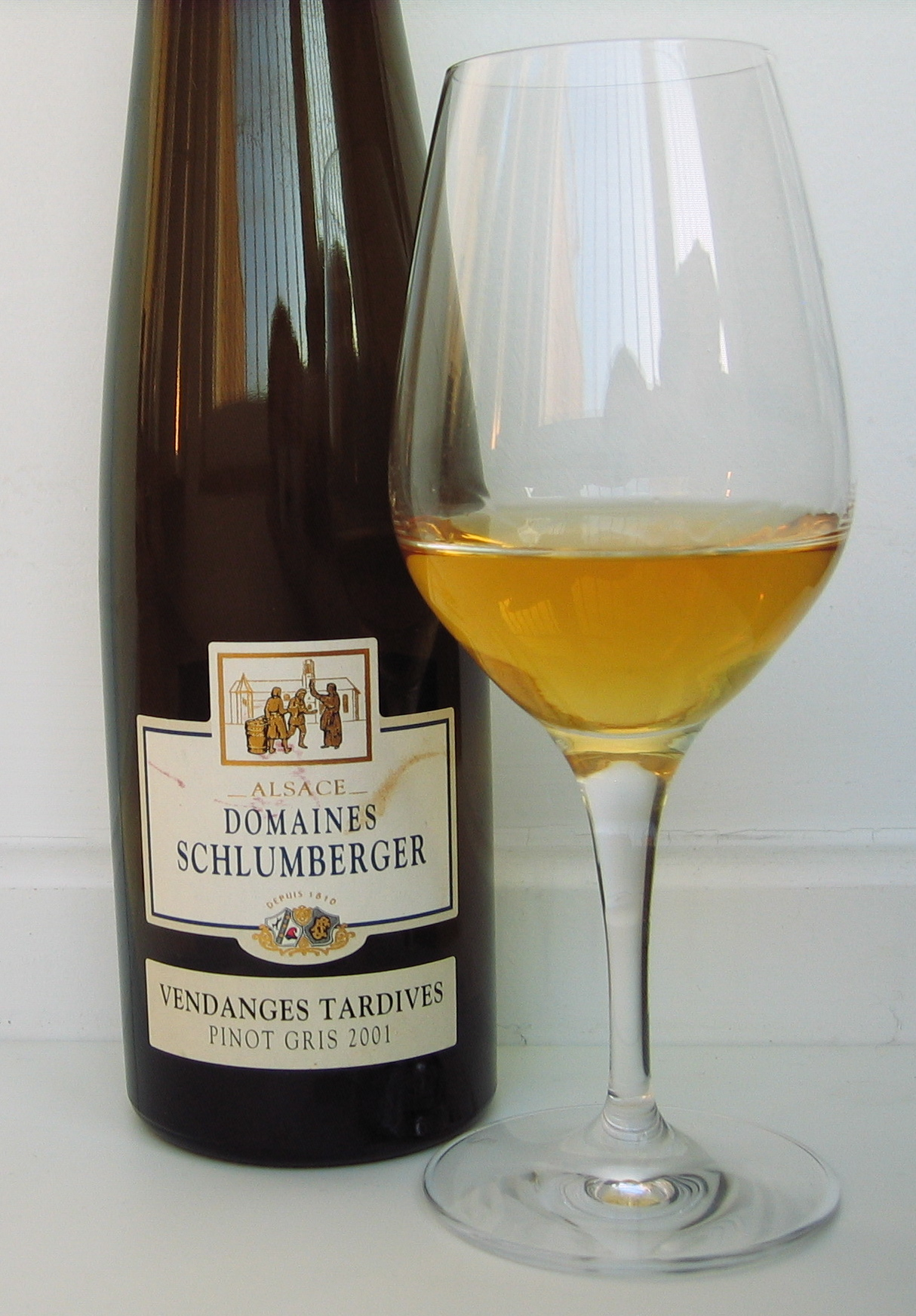
Pinot Gris

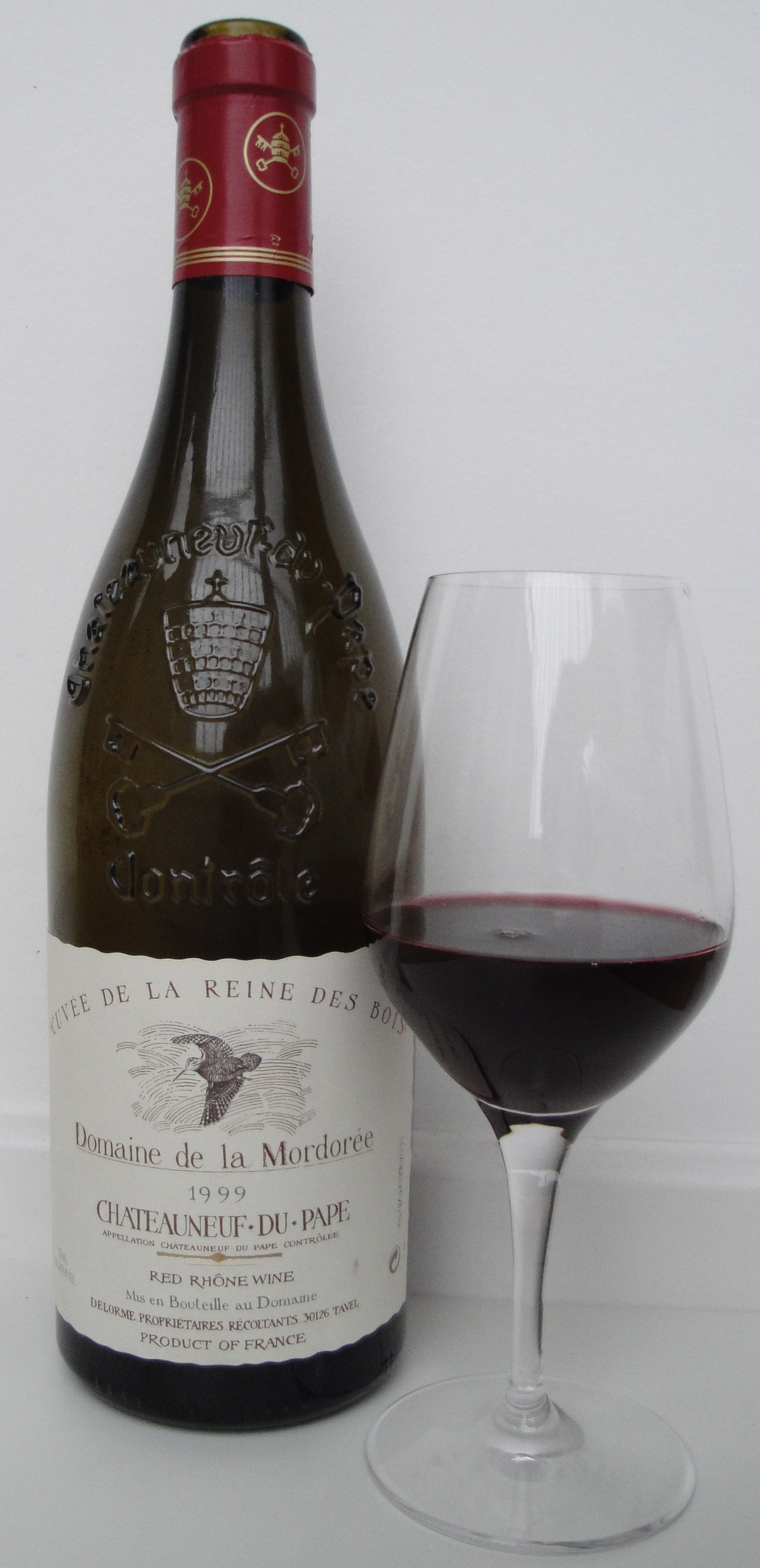
Chateauneuf du Pape

In early October 2018, the board of the Court of Master Sommeliers, Americas (CMSA) voted unanimously to suspend indefinitely the Master Sommelier credential awarded to all but one of an unprecedented 24 candidates who had passed its stringent annual membership exam a month previously at the Four Seasons Hotel St. Louis. The decision was taken after the CMSA's board learned that one of its own members, Reggie Narito, had passed advance information about two of the six wines candidates had to identify during the blind tasting section, considered the most challenging of the three portions of the exam. Two of the successful candidates, to whom the information was known to have been passed (a third had failed), unsolicited, were barred from retaking the exam for five years. All the others were allowed to make up the exam in December at no charge; six passed. Narito was expelled from the organization and lost his Master Sommelier title.

Aspiring Master Sommeliers often spend years, and considerable sums of money, acquiring the knowledge and experience necessary to pass the exam, the highest credential of the four the CMSA offers, which is only given to those invited to or recommended for it by those already members of the organization. The exam has an 8 percent pass rate; more people have been in space than become Master Sommeliers, entitled to append "MS" to their names in any wine-related context. Those who succeed have often been rewarded with increased income and more lucrative jobs in the wine industry.

For those reasons, the candidates whose titles were suspended protested the CMSA's decision as not only costing them economically, but casting aspersions on their professional integrity, since they were never offered a chance to prove their innocence. The CMSA defended the decision as the only way to preserve the title's integrity since it could not be determined how many candidates had seen the tip as opposed to merely being sent it. It sustained its decision on internal appeal, but in the process left itself open to public criticism of its internal investigation of the incident as cursory, secretive, and perhaps tainted by conflicts of interest. Rumors that the board's real motivation had been preventing public disclosure of earlier exams tainted by cheating were given credence in 2021 when a Vice article reported that a former candidate said the board had been aware of cheating on the exam almost 10 years earlier yet took no action save tightening testing procedures for the next exam. The affair has also given rise to more general criticism of the opacity of the exam administration process and CMSA's governance in general.

Some of those suspended have continued to pursue the title, and a few succeeded. Others, alienated by the CMSA's handling of the matter and a later sexual harassment scandal, have lost interest in ever becoming Master Sommeliers; some have decided to pursue the competing Master of Wine certification. One of the latter, Dan Pilkey, continued to use the "MS" post-nominal in social media posts about wine, and wear the lapel pin, even after the board suspended it. The CMSA sued him for infringement of its collective membership mark; the case was dismissed on procedural grounds and not refiled.

== Background ==
The first Master Sommelier exam was held in the United Kingdom in 1969; the Court of Master Sommeliers was established as a governing body for the exam in that country eight years later. In 1986, the first American exam was held, and the American branch of the Court formally organized in its wake. The Court's goal is to "encourage improved standards of beverage knowledge and service in hotels and restaurants." Many of those who have earned the title work outside the hospitality sector, for wineries or distributors. or as consultants.

Master Sommelier is the highest of four levels of certification the Court confers. Before attempting the annual exam candidates are required to have already passed the Introductory, Certified and Advanced Sommelier courses and exams, and worked in the hospitality industry in a wine-related capacity for at least 10 years. Candidates can only take the exam if invited or recommended by a member of the Court, and must still pay the exam fee of US$995 for each of three portions.

The three portions are:

- Theory: A 50-minute oral exam in which the candidate is asked questions meant to elicit answers demonstrating their knowledge of viticulture such as what grape varietals are grown and made into wine in various countries and wine-producing regions, the winemaking process and its science and history, and the laws that govern the wine industries in key regions such as, but not limited to, the United States, Australia, and the European Union and its member countries like France. Knowledge of beer, spirits and cigars must also be demonstrated. Candidates must pass the Theory portion before they can take the other two; the pass rate is roughly 10 percent.
- Practical Service: A test of the candidate's professional skills in which examiners play the part of diners whom the candidate is to recommend and properly serve wine appropriate to the dish purportedly ordered, sitting at a table set by the candidate. Examiners often act like difficult customers in order to test the candidate's ability to, as the Court puts it, "handle questions and complaints with skill, elegance and diplomacy".
- Tasting: Considered the most challenging portion since it requires candidates to correctly identify the vintage, year and region of six wines, three red and three white, served blindly, as well as comment on and describe the taste, in 25 minutes. It has been recalled as "a total mindfuck" by those who have taken it since unlike the other two portions, if the candidate fails it there is no way to learn from the experience and improve for the next attempt as the wines used are changed each time. (Note: One successful candidate reports having taken the Theory exam 10 times over 16 years.)

A 75 percent score is required on each portion to pass (in contrast to the 60 percent passing criterion for the lower-level exams). Once they have passed Theory, candidates must pass the other two sections in the next three years to become Master Sommeliers; if they do not they must start the process again. In the history of the exam only nine people have passed all three portions on their first attempt; the Court has awarded them a trophy known as the Krug Cup. Overall it is estimated that of out every 70 candidates only one eventually passes, as happened in one 2013 sitting of the exam. As of 2021, 269 people have passed the exam and become Master Sommeliers, fewer people than have been in space. The exam's overall pass rate is 8 percent, leading to it being called one of the world's most difficult tests to pass.

To prepare for the exam, as shown in the 2012 documentary film Somm and its sequels, aspiring Master Sommeliers cultivate relationships with those already Masters as a form of mentoring. They spend large quantities of their own money purchasing expensive wines to practice for the tasting portion. (Note: One Master Sommelier estimated that his total costs had come to $30,000 over the 10–12 years he had spent preparing.) Often they go into debt in the process, knowing that passing the exam and earning the MS will approximately double their income, to around $160,000, and allow them to pay those debts off. They also forgo a social life to study 20–30 hours a week, and often retain sports psychologists. "It requires a level of dedication that's almost a sickness", one Master said in 2021; it has also been compared to the process of becoming a Shaolin warrior monk.

== 2018 exam ==
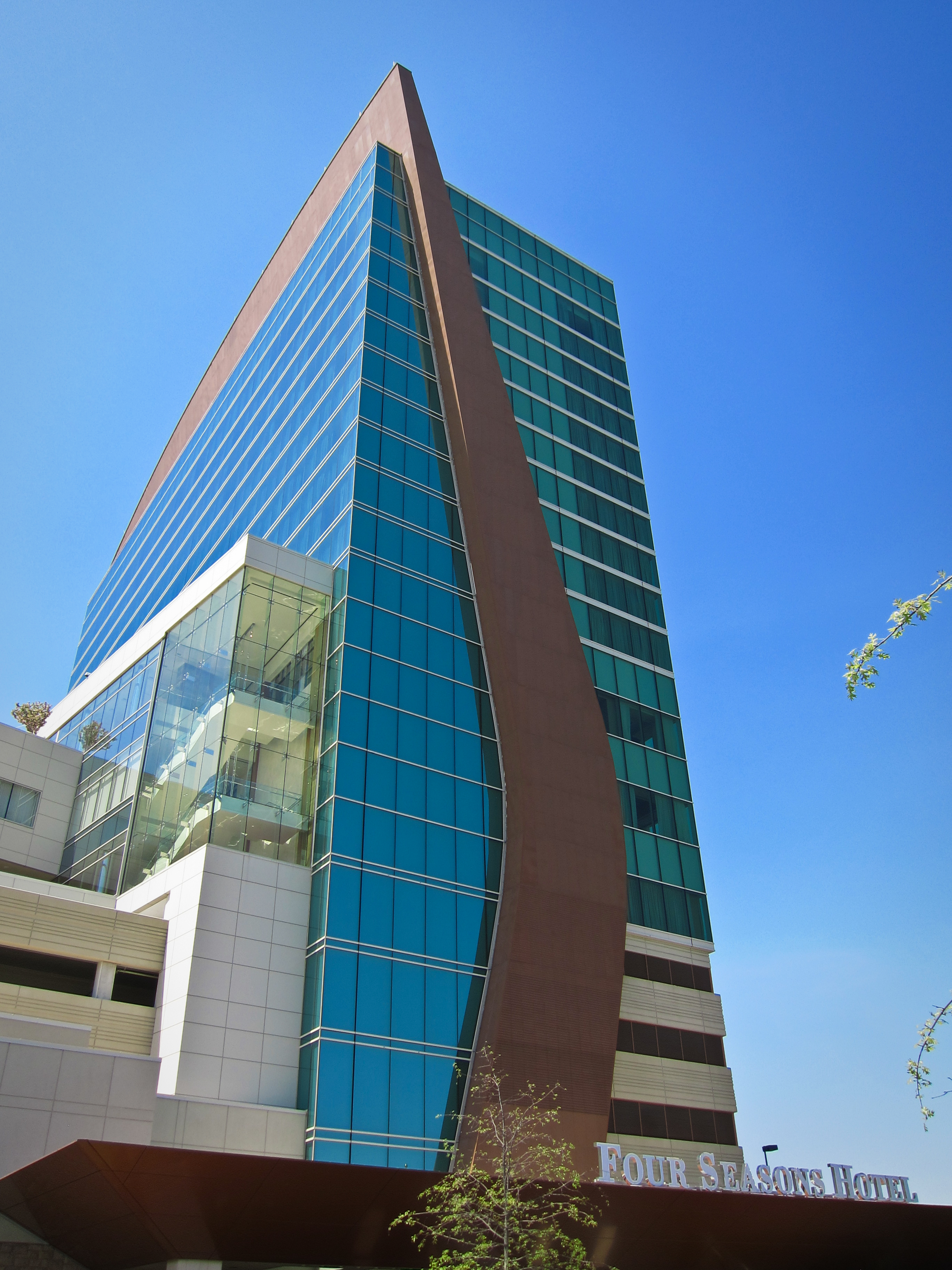
The Four Seasons St. Louis, where the 2018 exam was given

In early September 2018, 141 candidates, including some from outside the U.S., attempted the exam at the Four Seasons Hotel St. Louis over three days. On the morning of the Tasting portion, one of the candidates, Elton Nichols, recalled later receiving an email from Reggie Narito, at the time vice president for fine wines at California-based Young's Market Company and not only a Master Sommelier, but a member of the Court's board and one of the exam proctors that day. The subject line was "Heads up" with "PG, CndP" in the body. Nichols, who was acquainted slightly with Narito, having gone to Narito's house in the Bay Area from his own home in Seattle several times to taste wines along with other aspiring Master Sommeliers, understood this to mean pinot gris and Châteauneuf-du-Pape, two of the wines that candidates would be challenged to identify that day.

Nichols immediately deleted the email, but did nothing else. If, he reasoned, a Master Sommelier as prominent within the Court as Narito was involved in giving candidates advance information they were not supposed to have, others might also be, and informing any of the Court's officials present would not be productive. Nichols took the exam and passed, although he missed identifying one of the two wines in Narito's email. At the end of the day he would be one of 24 candidates to become Master Sommeliers, a success rate never achieved on any other exam. One had passed all three portions on his first attempt and was awarded the Krug Cup.

== Cheating allegations, investigation and aftermath ==
The newly credentialed Masters swiftly enjoyed the benefits of their position, receiving salary increases at their present jobs and fielding offers for new positions and business opportunities. Five weeks after the exam, the Court's board was approached by an attorney for one of that year's unsuccessful candidates, a woman who had also received Narito's email and, it was later disclosed, had previously been romantically involved with the Court's vice president, Matt Stamp. (Note: Stamp had reportedly failed to disclose the relationship to the board as required by Court policy, as well as another sexual relationship with another woman who took the exam, and resigned from the board shortly afterwards, a decision he later described through an attorney as mutual.) The attorney shared the email with the board, which immediately convened a special committee of its own to investigate.

After a three-day investigation over the first weekend of October, the special committee reported to an emergency meeting of the full board, from which it had recused Narito. After the special committee reported on the methodology of its investigation, the board voted unanimously, after much discussion, to revoke Narito's title and expel him from the Court, an action the board has never publicly confirmed; it is recorded in the meeting's minutes. Narito reportedly parted ways with his employer, as well; neither confirmed it to the media but shortly afterwards, Narito's LinkedIn profile indicated he was looking for work, which a Young's spokeswoman pointed out to the media. (Note: As of 2021 Narito's profile stated he left Young's in October 2018; he gives no current employer. He has declined all requests for comment.)

The special committee then explained to the board that while it had learned that the email had been sent to just three candidates, and it did not appear that any of the recipients had solicited the information from Narito, it was impossible to tell if those three had shared the email with others. After much debate, the board voted, again unanimously, with several members including the vice president recusing themselves, to suspend the Master Sommelier titles of 23 of those who had gained it in September, including Krug Cup winner Van Wagner. The one remaining new Master kept his title due to having passed the Tasting portion in a previous year.

To offset the loss of their titles, the board scheduled a makeup exam for December and waived the fee for those who wanted to retake it, except two: Nichols and the other successful candidate who had received the email. (Note: According to Jane Lopes, one of the candidates whose MS was suspended, there have been rumors of a fourth recipient.) They were barred from retaking the exam for five years, after which they would have to petition the board to be allowed to take it again. Most of the rest took the makeup exam, which only six passed.

All but four whose titles had been suspended organized as a group and appealed the Court's decision in a joint letter, demanding reinstatement and an apology. They were particularly upset by the haste with which the board had conducted its investigation and reached its decision, which they said could have better distinguished those innocent of cheating. The board had refused their offers to provide statements, take lie detector tests or allow their phones and other devices to be examined. It had also declined an offer by Young's CEO, Narito's former superior, to provide copies of other emails he had sent, which included the names of those the original email had been bcc'ed to.

Three others from the group of 23 passed the exam in 2019 and regained their titles. The exam has not been offered since then due to the COVID-19 pandemic; the Court has tolled the three-year limit for any candidates who have already passed one portion to pass the entire exam. Candidates are also allowed to request that certain Master Sommeliers recuse themselves from grading their exams. As of November 2021, the Court had announced the next Theory examination would be held July 2022 in Dallas, with the Service and Tasting portions to be held in September at a date and location to be determined later.

Some of those whose titles were revoked were so alienated that they decided not to make any further attempts to regain it. "I want to find a different industry to work in", one of them told the wine news site SevenFifty after the scandal broke. "I want this to be over." Jane Lopes, the first woman in Australia to have gained Master Sommelier status, wrote:

In examining my reasons for taking the exam in the first place, I found several: to pursue excellence in my profession, to prove to myself that I could do it in spite of my particular challenges, and to be in a position to educate, mentor, and influence in the industry. I know now that I don't need the letters "MS" after my name to pursue the first, prove that I did the second, or be in a position to do the third.

Nichols and Dan Pilkey, who had been attempting to pass the exam since 2010 and did not pass the free December retest, have both said they are not interested in regaining their titles by any means other than the Court's board admitting its mistake and reinstating them. Pilkey, joking that "the best way to get over a breakup is to find a new partner", has opted instead to pursue the Master of Wine certificate.

=== Criticism of investigation ===
The board's decision to investigate the matter internally also drew criticism. "I look at this from a business perspective", said Ken Frederickson, a 19-year Master Sommelier who founded a high-end Chicago-based wine and spirits distributor. "This type of situation would always be investigated by an outside organization" due to the potential or actual conflicts of interest involved. Dustin Wilson, a New York wine store owner whose successful bid to become a Master was the focus of Somm, notes that despite the board's vice president acknowledging his conflict due to his past relationship with the woman who had brought Narito's email to the board's attention, he was still part of the special committee that conducted the investigation. "That shows you it's really just an old boys club," he commented.

Critics also found the board to have been overly secretive about its investigation. When its members first learned of the allegations, then-president Devon Broglie warned members several times not to discuss the matter with anyone outside the Court, and after it became public discouraged them from speaking to the media. A few days after the scandal broke, Nichols decided to go to the board himself and disclose that he, too, had received Narito's email. The board thanked him for coming forward but asked him not to tell anyone else that he had done so, which he found odd. Nichols had also planned to make that disclosure to the group of 19 suspended Masters, but before he did someone close to the Court let Dan Pilkey, a leader of the group, know that there was another person among them who had received the email. The ensuing discord among the group when Nichols admitted it was him was later perceived by some of the former Masters as a deliberate attempt to undermine their unity.

Eventually some members of the suspended group got copies of the minutes of the October board meeting where it had voted to expel Narito and invalidate the tasting exam results. The description of the investigation's methodology had been redacted in its entirety, as well as passages recounting what was described as lengthy debate preceding the motions to expel Narito and invalidate the results. The entire document has been compared to something that might have been released by the CIA.

== Possible cheating on previous exams ==
Suspicion grew among the suspended Masters that the board's handling of the incident reflected not incompetence so much as malfeasance, that its main goal had been to forestall the disclosures that might have come from a full investigation. They noted that Narito had not tried to conceal what he was doing, to the point of even using his work email account. That suggested that he felt little or no risk of consequences, that he or others had done this before and that it was cheating on earlier exams, including some where board members had earned their Master titles, they did not want disclosed.

In 2021, Arthur Black, a onetime Master candidate himself who taught many classes and performed other services for the Court but never passed the exam despite his stellar performance on the Theory section (he believes his outspokenness alienated some key members) shared with Vice an account of a conversation he had had with a prominent Master he did not name during the 2009 exam. It had long been customary for candidates taking the Theory portion to reconstruct the questions they had been asked and compile them into a study guide for their own, and others', future attempts at the exam. That year, rumors had circulated that some candidates who sat the exam in the morning had emailed questions they remembered to others who took it that afternoon.

Over billiards that evening, the Master asked Black what he knew about the "breach" of the exam that day. Unlike the 2018 exam, no action was ever taken by the board against anyone involved. The following year exam procedures were changed; candidates were sequestered and their phones were taken during the Theory portion, a procedure that has been followed since.

== Lawsuits ==
After failing the retest, on which he said he felt like he was "playing not to lose", Pilkey began adding "MS" to his social media posts about wine and wearing the red lapel pin identifying him as a Master Sommelier, disregarding the Court's withdrawal of his title. The Court sent him letters ordering him to cease and desist or be sued for membership infringement, as it owns the Master Sommelier trademark and with it the exclusive right to say who can call themselves one. Pilkey responded by challenging the Court to proceed with suit as he believed he had fairly earned the title and unjustly been denied further use of it.

In June 2019 the Court filed an action against Pilkey in federal court for the Northern District of California, where it is based. A group of Masters who had been critical of the board's handling of the exam paid for Pilkey's attorney, who was able to get the case dismissed by the end of the year on a procedural issue: CMSA had asserted the court had personal jurisdiction over Pilkey, a resident of Chicago, because of his employment as Midwest regional sales director for a California-based winery, his past personal ties to the state, and his social media posts about California wines, including geotags mentioning specific locations in the state as where the accompanying pictures were taken. The court agreed with Pilkey that the first two were not enough to establish jurisdiction and while the third might have been, they did not qualify as commercial endeavors since his sales territory did not include California and the wines in question were available anywhere in the United States. (Note: Internet law expert Eric Goldman found the court's logic on the geotags might become precedential in a future case as it could be seen as clearly evincing intent on a defendant's part to communicate to or with a particular geographic region, possibly leading to a holding opposite to the one found in Pilkey's case.) By that time Pilkey had stopped claiming the title publicly, wording his LinkedIn profile's header to say only that he passed the September 2018 exam.

Pilkey learned from the Court's filings in response to the lawsuit that the Master Sommelier titles he and the other 22 had held briefly were not, in fact, revoked but merely suspended. While he has disdained further interest in regaining the title, in 2021 he still expressed his desire that the Court admit its mistake, apologize, and give him and the other 20 who did not receive the email the chance to accept the title as long as they wanted to.

In 2022 Pilkey, Van Wagner and Peter Bothwell, a third person whose MS had been suspended, filed suit in federal court against CMS and associated individuals, including Narito. They alleged that the investigation of the cheating was cursory, intended to keep past misdeeds from becoming public knowledge, and that they were thus unfairly punished. The board never interviewed Narito nor reviewed his emails, they alleged in their complaint, and none of the 23 candidates who had passed the taste test that day were interviewed.

== Catalyst for efforts to reform Court and exam ==
The September 2018 class of Masters were not the only ones associated with the organization who found its handling of the exam results disturbing. Their concerns focused not just on the way the exam had historically been administered but the Court's governance as well. They were heightened after a sexual harassment scandal reported in 2020 forced the resignation of the entire board. (Note: In late 2021 the new board voted to expel six Masters, including Stamp, after investigating, and barred Geoff Kruth, who had already been expelled, from ever applying for reinstatement. Some of the accusers and George Linder, one of the expelled Masters, said that others who had been accused of more serious misbehavior "got a pass". Linder said that those men had in some cases "groomed" preferred female candidates in preparation for sexual relationships.)

Starting with the 2019 exam the Court began putting in place new security procedures, including sequestering proctors as well as candidates and requiring them to surrender their electronic devices. Proctors are also not allowed to be alone with a candidate at any time during the exam. The exam itself is also becoming more compartmentalized, so that no single proctor knows all the material being tested or all the candidates taking the exam.

Critics believe those reforms are not enough. They point to the opacity of the exam and its grading as a root cause of the scandal and ensuing discontent. Candidates are never told what their exact score was on each portion of the exam, only that they passed, and on the Tasting portion the identities of the wine are never revealed. Pilkey has noted the contrast with the tasting sessions in the Master of Wine training, which does share with students what wines they tasted, and finds it more conducive to learning.

Even one of the Court's board members, Joseph Spellman, agrees that more transparency on the test would be for the better. "I have long wished", he wrote in a Facebook post after the scandal, "that we revealed at least some info on the wines after the exams." He admitted he was in the minority, and as long as the board's exam committee insists on reserving the right to change the sequence and/or selection of wines, or how they are scored, to compensate for flaws in the exam process, that is unlikely to change. Spellman also confirmed that the exam procedure gives the proctors the right to change candidates' scores after the exam, lending support to rumors that proctors had often lobbied for extra points for preferred candidates after the exams had been administered.

From the outset of the scandal, Wilson, Frederickson and a group of other longtime Masters including wine writer Richard Betts and Lopes' husband Jonathan Ross, had joined the calls to reinstate the suspended titles, investigate more thoroughly and reform the way the Court was run. "There should be a good amount of transparency between the broader membership and the decisions being made by the board", Wilson said. He and others noted that the Court, a 501(c)(6) nonprofit under U.S. tax law, reported revenues of $4.5 million in 2017, which would be more than enough to hire a full-time nonmember with experience to run the organization; Frederickson also points out that the scandal shows the need for a human resources (HR) department.

Instead, the Court has persisted with having the head of its board serve as its executive, notwithstanding his own professional responsibilities, if any. Like all members of the board, his Court duties are unpaid. Under the Court's bylaws, candidates for board seats must have been Masters for three years, and teach at least four courses or proctor as many exams while they serve as directors. Wilson says this results in the board becoming "an insiders' club ... [that] limits the scope of perspective of the group running the organization."

During 2019, the board responded to some concerns. It had the Court join the Institute for Credentialing Excellence, and explored the possibility of hiring an outsider to run its daily operations, and explored providing more organizational support for those operations and the examinations as well as looking at companies that could provide HR support. In 2020, responding to concerns that its culture was racially exclusionary in the wake of highly publicized Black Lives Matter protests, the board dropped the requirement that all Masters be addressed by others with that title and their last name at Court functions.

After The New York Times reported on a culture of longterm sexual harassment within the organization in 2020, (Note: Among the women making allegations was Lopes.) some of the most respected and prominent Masters, including former vice president Stamp and Court cofounder Fred Dame, were suspended from Court activities. (Note: Both men were among the six expelled from the Court a year later.) Alpana Singh, the youngest woman and the first Indian American to make Master Sommelier, renounced her title in support of the women, and the entire board resigned in advance of that year's elections.

In addition to Singh, Betts also left the Court in protest, saying he wished he had done it sooner since the organization "no longer aligns with [his] views". Another Master, Bobby Stuckey, owner and sommelier of Frasca Food and Wine in Boulder, Colorado, has stopped teaching the Advanced Sommelier class until reforms have been made. "I'm into hospitality, and hospitality is about always thinking about the other person", he said. "The way we have treated these candidates doesn't do that."

To facilitate reform, all the board members resigned before the 2020 elections. Their replacements included two women, one of whom, Emily Wines, became chair. The Court's new board held listening sessions around the country in an effort to be more open with members, but said nothing regarding the cheating scandal. Later, it hired a professional ethicist to overhaul its code in that area, another firm to transform its workplace culture, and another investigator for the harassment allegations, leading to the expulsion of Dame and Stamp. It also reached outside the organization for the first time to hire executive director Julie Cohen Theobald, and later four board members from outside the wine industry. Lastly, it created a hundred scholarships for people of color, women and people in need, and putting the training programs online in order to diversify the organization.
