= Emily Wines =

American wine professional

- Born: 1973 or 1974 (age 52–53)

Emily Wines is an American wine professional and as of December 2020 board chair of the Court of Master Sommeliers (CMS) of the United States.

== Early life ==
Wines grew up in the Pacific Northwest. "Wines" is the real, legal name under which she was born, an aptronym.

== Career ==
Wines began working in the restaurant industry in San Francisco as a young adult. She received her Master Sommelier accreditation in 2008. She was featured in the 2012 documentary Somm.

She worked for Kimpton Hotels. In 2017, she became vice president for beverage for Cooper's Hawk. Wines received a Grand Award from Wine Spectator and a James Beard nomination for wine service.

=== Court of Master Sommeliers ===
She previously served as a CMS board member from 2013 to 2015. In 2018, CMS experienced a cheating scandal. In 2020, during the Me Too movement, The New York Times revealed a pattern of sexual harassment involving multiple powerful male members of CMS. In response to the sexual harassment scandal, the body made a statement in support of the women who had spoken up, but omitted mention of increased transparency or investigations. Public feedback to the response was negative. In November, the court issued an apology to the women named in the article in the Times. It also announced the suspensions of seven of its Master Sommeliers pending further investigation, and the resignation of another Master Sommelier. Those suspended included Fred Dame, a co-founder of the group.

The organization in November 2020 held elections and replaced chair Devon Broglie, who had subsequently to the original New York Times story been himself accused of sexual harassment, with Wines. Broglie, as well as being the board chair, had been a member of the organization's ethics committee, which was in charge of investigating sexual misconduct.

Wines prioritized professionalizing the organization by hiring an executive director; the organization hire Julie Cohen Theobald and added board seats representing industries unrelated to hospitality.
