= Aptronym =

Person's name related to their profession

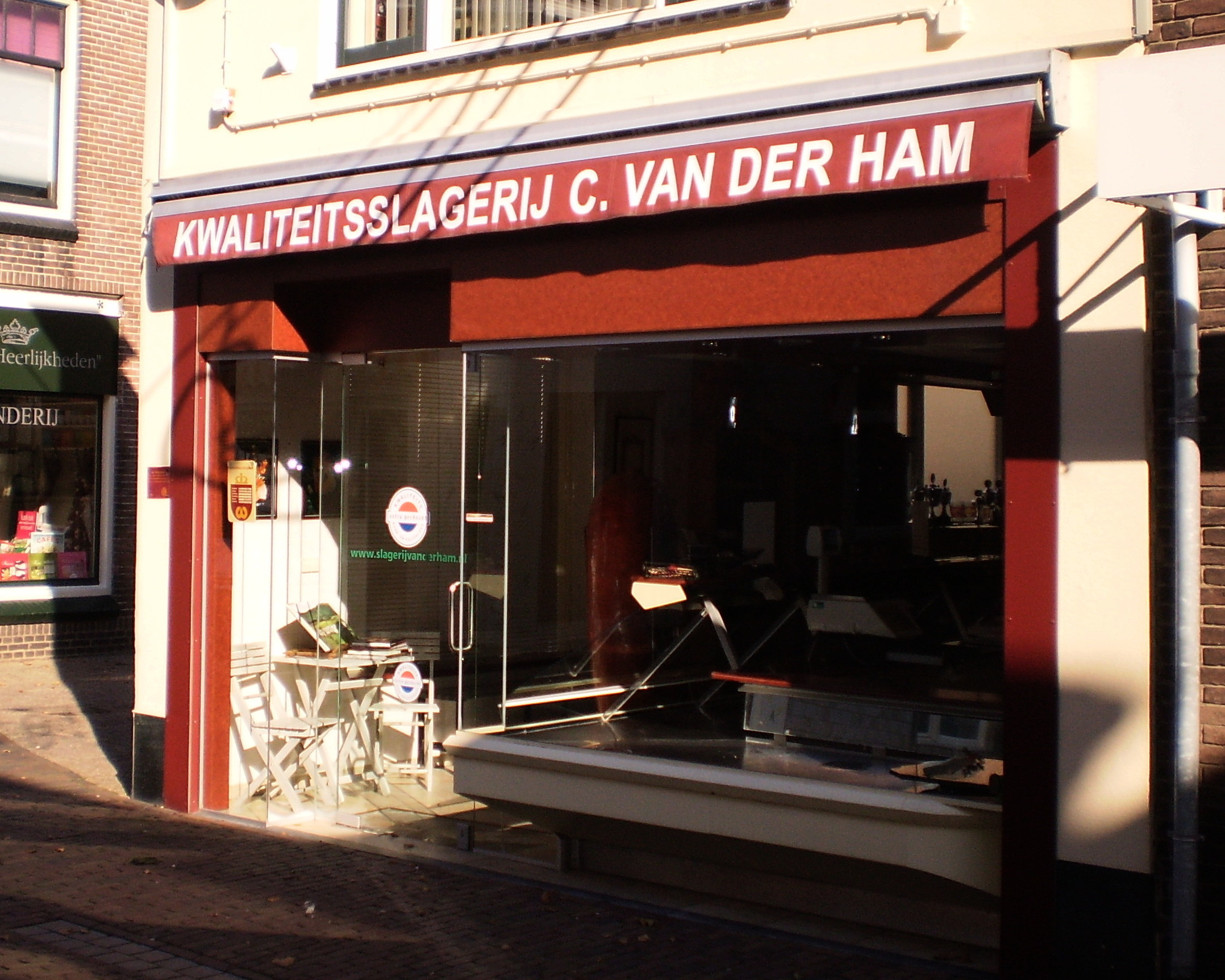
A butcher's shop in Leerdam owned by "C. van der Ham"

An aptronym, aptonym, or euonym is a personal name aptly or peculiarly suited to its owner (e.g. their occupation). The word "euonym" (eu- + -onym), dated to late 1800, is defined as "a name well suited to the person, place, or thing named".

Gene Weingarten of The Washington Post coined the word inaptonym as an antonym for "aptonym".

== History ==
The Encyclopædia Britannica says that the term was allegedly invented by columnist Franklin P. Adams, who coined the word "aptronym" as an anagram of patronym, to emphasize "apt". The Oxford English Dictionary reported that the word appeared in a Funk & Wagnall’s dictionary in 1921, defined as "a surname indicative of an occupation: as, Glass, the glazier". Psychologist Carl Jung wrote in his 1960 book Synchronicity that there was a "sometimes quite grotesque coincidence between a man's name and his peculiarities".

In the 1966 book What's in a Name?, Paul Dickson, among other peculiar types of surnames, has a section on aptronyms which includes a list of aptronyms selected from his large collection. The latter originated from the one received from professor Lewis P. Lipsitt of Brown University and further expanded with the help of Dickson's friends, mostly from newspapers and phone books. Some newspaper columnists collect aptronyms as well.

== Notable examples ==
- Jules Angst, Swiss professor of psychiatry, who has published works about anxiety (angst)
- Michael Ball, English footballer
- Layne Beachley, Australian former world champion surfer
- Matthew Alan Beat, American internet personality who publishes music videos on YouTube
- Alexander Graham Bell, developer of the telephone
- Bert "Tito" Beveridge, founder of beverage company Tito's Vodka
- Ian Bishop, Church of England bishop
- Doctor Willard Bliss, physician who treated President James A. Garfield (his given name was "Doctor")
- Sara Blizzard, meteorologist and television weather presenter for the BBC
- Usain Bolt, Jamaican sprinter
- Gary Bowser, game console hacker sued by Nintendo, whose Super Mario villain is also named Bowser
- Doug Bowser, Former President of Nintendo of America, again in reference to the Super Mario villain Bowser
- Russell Brain, 1st Baron Brain, neurologist
- Rosalind Brewer, executive at Starbucks and former director at Molson Coors Brewing Company
- Rosalind Canter, British Olympic equestrienne (woman who rides horses professionally), winner of the 2018 FEI World Equestrian Games
- Christopher Coke and his father Lester Lloyd Coke, Jamaican drug lords and cocaine traffickers
- Thomas Crapper, British sanitary engineer often erroneously referred to as the inventor of the flush toilet
- Ed Currie, a world-record holding breeder of chili peppers, a primary ingredient in curry
- Mark De Man, Belgian football defender (marking an opposing player)
- Helen DeWitt, comic novelist
- Creflo Dollar, American millionaire megachurch pastor
- David Dollar, American economist
- Carla Dove, American ornithologist who specializes in bird strikes
- Storm Dunlop, British meteorologist and author of How to Identify Weather
- Josh Earnest, the third press secretary for the Obama administration
- Norm Eisen, special council for ethics in the Obama administration, with a focus on norms in government
- Rich Fairbank, American billionaire and CEO of the Capital One bank, which holds the Fairbanking Mark for offering fair banking products
- Cecil Fielder and Prince Fielder, father-and-son baseball players (fielder)
- Jeff Float, American swimmer
- Bob Flowerdew, British gardener and TV/radio presenter
- Amy Freeze, American meteorologist
- Learned Hand, American judge, considered a "craftsman" of the law.
- William Headline, former Washington bureau chief for CNN
- Sunny Hostin, American television host
- John Hunter, Scottish hunter and writer
- Selwyn Image, English artist and designer
- Fielder Jones, American baseball center fielder
- Igor Judge, English judge and Lord Chief Justice
- John Laws, English judge and Lord Justice of Appeal
- Jonatan Leandoer, Swedish rapper (known professionally as Yung Lean) and former drug addict who frequently consumed the opioid-based drink lean
- Michael Lord, British member of the House of Lords
- Richard and Mildred Loving, plaintiffs in Loving v. Virginia, which legalized interracial marriage throughout the United States
- Péter Magyar, prime minister of Hungary (“magyar” is the Hungarian word for “Hungarian”)
- George McGovern, American politician and senator in the federal government
- Paul McStay, Scottish footballer who spent his entire career at Celtic F.C. before retiring in 1997
- Nicolae Militaru, Romanian military officer and Minister of National Defense
- Chris Moneymaker, American poker player and 2003 World Series of Poker champion
- Sina Movahed, youngest ever Iranian chess grandmaster ("seen a move ahead")
- David W. Music, American composer of church music
- Eugenius Outerbridge, inaugural chairman of the Port Authority of New York and New Jersey; namesake of the Outerbridge Crossing, the outermost bridge between New York (Staten Island) and New Jersey
- Gabe Pressman, American journalist
- Francine Prose, American novelist
- Rich Ricci, American-British banker
- Corona Rintawan, Indonesian physician who led Muhammadiyah's command center for the COVID-19 pandemic
- Bob Rock, Canadian music producer best known for his works with rock acts such as Metallica and Aerosmith
- Philander Rodman, father of Dennis Rodman, who fathered 29 children by 16 mothers
- Mat Sadler, English football manager who played for and managed Walsall, nicknamed "The Saddlers"
- Tennys Sandgren, American tennis player
- Marilyn vos Savant, American columnist who has been cited for having the world's highest-recorded IQ (savant)
- Toby Savin, English football goalkeeper (saving)
- Max Schreck, German actor known for portraying Count Orlok in the 1922 horror film Nosferatu ("Schreck" translates to "fright" or "scare" in German)
- Offer Shlomi, better known as Vince Offer, Israeli-American TV infomercial pitchman
- Kayla Sims, American YouTuber and Twitch streamer, best known for playing The Sims 4
- Daniel Snowman, British historian and author of book on polar explorations
- Scott Speed, American racecar driver who has raced in a variety of motorsport, including Formula One and Formula E
- Alec Steele, British Blacksmith and YouTuber
- Marina Stepanova, Russian hurdler
- Dávid Strelec, Slovak football forward ("Strelec" is the Slovak word for "shooter" or "striker")
- Eugène Terre'Blanche, South African white nationalist (Terre'Blanche translates to "white land" in French)
- Juan Trippe, founder of Pan American Airways
- George Francis Train, entrepreneur who was heavily involved in the construction of the eastern portion of the first transcontinental railroad across the United States
- Donald Trump, United States president and businessman known for an emphasis on "winning" (trump card)
- Katie Volynets, American tennis player
- Marc Webb, director of The Amazing Spider-Man (2012) and The Amazing Spider-Man 2 (2014) (spider web)
- Keith Weed, president of the Royal Horticultural Society
- Anthony Weiner, American politician involved in sexting scandals
- Arsène Wenger, French football manager, managed Arsenal F.C. from 1996 to 2018
- Amy Winehouse, British singer-songwriter who died from alcohol poisoning in her home
- Emily Wines, American wine professional and board chair of the Court of Master Sommeliers
- Wolfgang Wolf, German football manager, managed VfL Wolfsburg from 1998 to 2003
- William Wordsworth, English poet
- Early Wynn, baseball pitcher, member of the 300 win club
- David Møller Wolfe, Norwegian footballer who plays for Wolverhampton Wanderers (known as Wolves)
- Tiger Woods, American professional golfer; a wood is a type of golf club
- Mary Yu, associate justice of the Washington Supreme Court who officiated the state's first same-sex marriage

=== Inaptonyms ===
- Kevin Admiral, United States Army general
- Rob Banks, British police officer
- Grant Balfour, baseball pitcher ("ball four")
- Frank Beard, American musician who, until c. 2013, was the only member of rock band ZZ Top without a beard
- Don Black, white supremacist
- Peter Bowler, cricketer (in fact, primarily a batsman)
- Jimmy Doolittle, U.S. Army Air Corps pilot who led the first major bombing raid on Japan during World War II, was referred to as "...a man whose exploits utterly belie his name" by the Baltimore Sun, and according to the New York Times "...should be named Doomuch". However, the chief of the Japanese Army's press section, trying to downplay the raid, stated "We have the pleasure of conferring upon him the title 'Did Little'... ...We may expect the next commander which Roosevelt is likely to appoint as his successor will be Colonel 'Do Nothing'."
- Samuel Foote, British actor who lost a leg in a horseriding accident in 1766, and made jokes on stage about "Foote and leg, and leg and foot"
- Claudio Gentile, Italian footballer known for his strength
- Matt Gobush, spokesperson for Al Gore during his campaign for the 2000 presidential election, which Gore eventually lost to rival George W. Bush
- Ciro Immobile, Italian footballer known for eluding defenders
- Colleen Lawless, American lawyer and judge
- Neversink, a town in New York state that was submerged by the Neversink Reservoir in 1953
- Gary Oldman, English actor, is 13 days younger (21 March 1958) than English musician Gary Numan (8 March 1958, pronounced "new man")
- Danielle Outlaw, former Philadelphia Police Commissioner
- Larry Playfair, ice hockey player known for fighting
- Jaime Sin, Catholic prelate; upon being made a cardinal in 1976, he gained the further inaptronymic title of "Cardinal Sin"
- Sam Sung, Apple Inc. employee.
- Batman bin Suparman, Singaporean man who was imprisoned in 2013 on theft and drug possession charges (Batman and Superman both being crime-fighting superheroes)
- Bob Walk, baseball pitcher

== See also ==
- Autological word
- -onym
- Nominative determinism, the hypothesis that a person's name can have a significant role in determining key aspects of their job, profession or even character
- Occupational surname
