= Jason Wise (director) =

American filmmaker

- Born: Cleveland, Ohio, U.S.
- Education: Chapman University
- Occupations: Film director; producer
- Spouse: Christina Wise
- Children: 2

Jason Wise is an American filmmaker known for his wine documentaries (SOMM, SOMM: Into the Bottle, SOMM 3), Wait for Your Laugh featuring Rose Marie, The Delicacy about sea urchin divers, and the streaming service SOMM TV.

== Early life and education ==
Wise was born in Cleveland, Ohio, and attended film school at Chapman University in Orange, California.

== Career ==
Wise's senior thesis film, “90,” played on the international film festival circuit. After Hurricane Katrina, he was hired to document the efforts of Cisco Systems as they rebuilt Gulf Coast schools. In 2011 he was the director and show runner for the PBS series Escapeseeker for two seasons.

His first documentary SOMM, released in 2012, followed four candidates for the Master Sommelier examination.

Wise followed SOMM with SOMM: Into the Bottle in 2015 and SOMM 3 in 2018. In 2017, he made Wait for Your Laugh. about Rose Marie. In 2020, he made The Delicacy, about sea urchin divers in Santa Barbara. The Whole Animal was released in 2022. A fourth film in the SOMM series, Cup of Salvation, was in production as of 2020.

In 2019, Wise and others launched food and wine streaming service SOMM TV.

Wise's production company is called Forgotten Man Films.

== Personal life ==
Jason is married to writer and producer Christina Wise. They have two children.

== Filmography ==
- SOMM (director)
- SOMM: Into the Bottle (director)
- SOMM 3 (director)
- Wait For Your Laugh (director)
- The Delicacy (director)
- Escapeseeker 13 episodes 2011-2012 (director)
- Uncorked 6 episodes 2015 (executive producer)

== Awards and honors ==
In 2015, Wise was named one of the “40 Most Influential” people in the world of beverages under the age of forty by Wine Enthusiast Magazine. In 2019 he was named Documentarian of the Year at the Kodak Awards.
