= Peter Neptune =

American wine expert (born 1956)

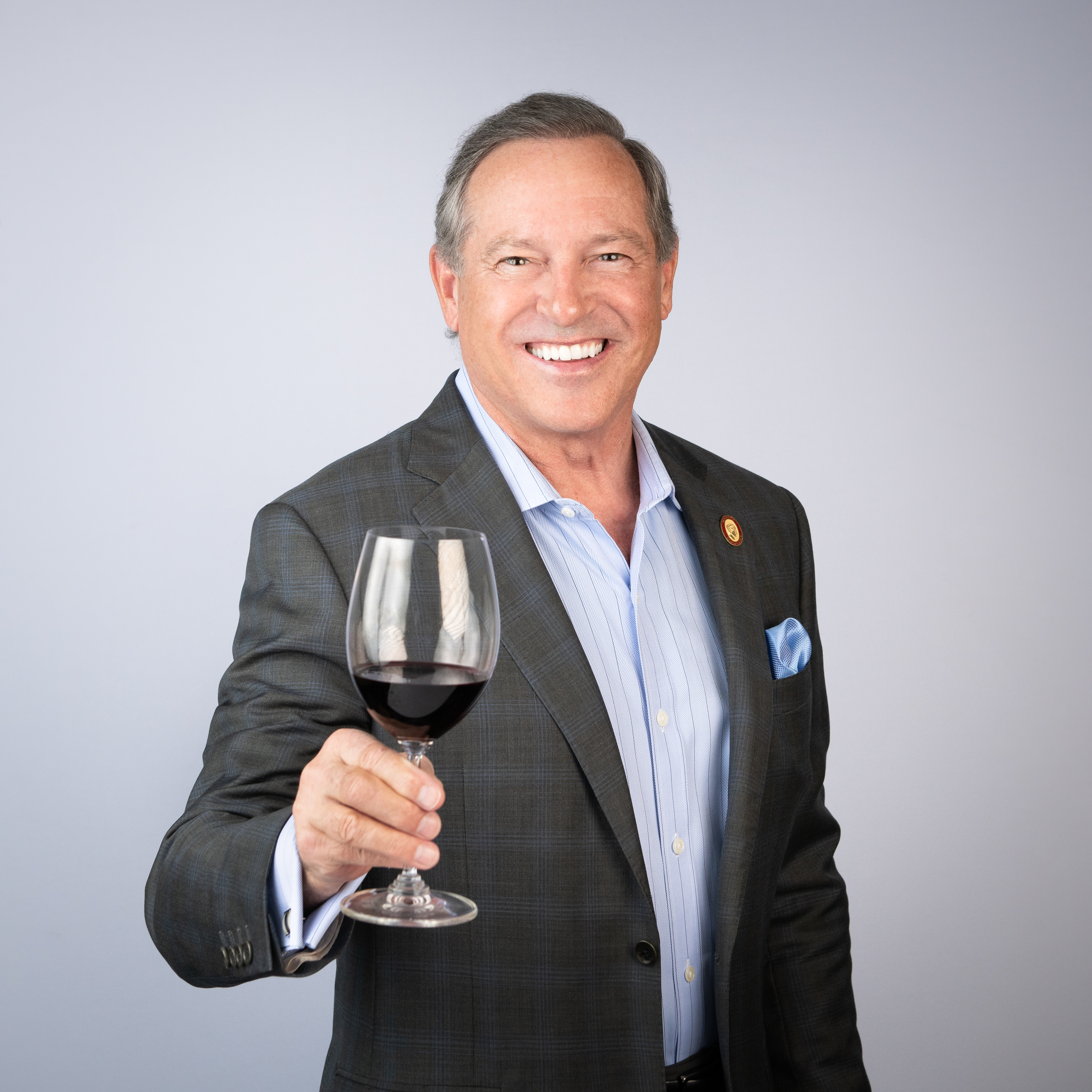
- Born: July 10, 1956 (age 70); Newport Beach, California, U.S.
- Occupations: Actor; Master Sommelier; wine educator and consultant
- Known for: Master Sommelier, Certified Wine Educator, Founder of the Neptune Wine School, Associate of the Institute of Wines and Spirits, Examiner at the Certified, Advanced, and Master Sommelier Examinations, restaurant consultant, public speaker, former television and stage actor
- Website: neptunewine.com

Peter Neptune (born July 10, 1956) is an American wine expert.

He was one of 147 Master Sommeliers in North America, as of June 2015, and is the founder of the Orange County, California–based Neptune School of Wine. He appeared on and off Broadway in 1984 and 1985, appeared in numerous television movies and series from 1988 through 1990, and appeared as himself in the 2013 wine documentary SOMM.

== Life and career ==
Neptune was born in Newport Beach, California, on July 10, 1956. He started learning about wine and food while working at a Laguna Beach, California, restaurant called Tivoli Terrace, owned by his stepmother, June.

=== Acting career ===
In 1979, Neptune moved to New York City to become a theater actor. He studied acting with Wynn Handman at The American Place Theatre. He was a featured actor in playwright Cynthia Heimel's play A Girl's Guide to Chaos, and also originated the role of Jeff Barry in the 1984 Off-Broadway production of Leader of the Pack, appearing in the 1985 Broadway production as well.

He also appeared in a variety of television productions. He filmed a number of programs in New York City and also commuted back to Los Angeles. His roles include the television action film C.A.T. Squad: Python Wolf (1988) and the television biopic Rock Hudson (1990) as well as guest appearances in television series, including L.A. Law (1988), Tour of Duty (1988), Hardball (1989) and Life Goes On (1989). He also made a guest appearance as Crewman Aron on Star Trek: The Next Generation, in the second season episode "The Dauphin" (1989).

While pursuing acting opportunities, he supplanted his income by working in restaurants. He convinced the manager of a high-end restaurant to allow him to manage the wine program, even though he had relatively little experience with wine.

In 1989, after ten years working in various productions while also working as a sommelier in restaurants, he returned to Orange County. Soon after moving back, he was up for a leading role in a television series, but when he did not get the part after multiple callbacks, he decided to forgo his acting career and devote himself full-time to wine.

=== Wine sales and education ===
In the mid-1990s, starting out as a wine salesman, he became more educated about wine, and realized that he could be as good if not better than many of the experts. He traveled to New York to take his first wine examination, and, after failing, studied intently and eventually passed. He joined Benicia, California–based Henry Wine Group and eventually became its senior vice president of corporate training – training and educating fellow employees as well as retail customers about wine.

=== Neptune School of Wine ===
In 2003, Neptune founded the Neptune School of Wine, the first school in Southern California dedicated to teaching the wine curriculum established by London-based Wine & Spirit Education Trust (WSET), considered the world's foremost wine education group. The school administers WSET wine education programs, as well as the French Wine Scholar program and examination offered by the Washington, D.C.–based French Wine Society.

=== Master Sommelier ===
In 2005, Neptune passed the Master Sommelier examination, becoming one of 229 certified Master Sommeliers worldwide, as of June 2015. He was the first person in decades to pass the examination while living in Southern California. As of June 2015, he was one of the teaching Masters at the Court of Master Sommelier Intro and Advanced Courses, and was an examiner at the Certified, Advanced, and Master Sommelier Examinations.

=== SOMM ===
Through Neptune's participation as a Master Sommelier examiner, he met director Jason Wise, who with Neptune's help was given permission to film part of the Master Sommelier examination for SOMM, a 2013 documentary following four candidates through the process. Wise featured Neptune in the documentary, playing himself, along with fellow Master Sommeliers Michael Jordan, Fred Dame and Geoff Kruth. Neptune was recognized for the passion and enthusiasm he showed for wine while giving his filmed interviews.

== Additional wine credentials ==
In addition to his Master Sommelier Diploma, Neptune holds the title of Certified Wine Educator (CWE) with the Society of Wine Educators, has a diploma in Wine and Spirits from the London-based Wine & Spirit Education Trust (WSET), is recognized as an Associate of the Institute of Wines and Spirits (AIWS), a title bestowed upon wine experts who complete WSET's diploma, and holds the credential French Wine Scholar, with Highest Honors.

== Wine consulting ==
As a certified Master Sommelier, Neptune acts as a wine program consultant for a variety of hotels and restaurants nationwide, including Fairmont Hotels and Resorts' properties the Fairmont San Francisco and the Plaza Hotel in Manhattan, as well as the Terranea Resort in Rancho Palos Verdes, California, and the restaurant One Pico at the Shutters on the Beach Hotel in Santa Monica, California, where Los Angeles Times restaurant critic S. Irene Virbila noted that the "user-friendly list from Master Sommelier Peter Neptune is very fairly priced for a hotel restaurant." Neptune's wine list at One Pico has won Wine Spectator's 2014 Award of Excellence every year since 2009.
