= Geoff Kruth =

American wine professional

Geoff Kruth is an American wine professional. He founded and was president of GuildSomm, a nonprofit that helps prepare candidates for the Master Sommelier exam, and was featured in the 2012 documentary SOMM as an expert on the process of becoming certified as a Master Sommelier.

Kruth resigned his position as Master Sommelier from the Court of Master Sommeliers in 2020 after being caught up in an organization-wide sexual harassment scandal during the Me Too movement; according to the New York Times, almost a dozen women accused him of sexual misconduct over a period of many years. Some of the accusations involved coercive pressure to exchange sex for professional favors.

After the sexual misconduct accusations he resigned his position at GuildSomm.
