= Jon Bonné =

American wine and food writer

- Born: 1972 (age 53–54)
- Website: jonbonne.com

Jon Bonné is an American wine and food writer, and since 2020 the managing editor of Resy. Formerly he was a columnist for the San Francisco Chronicle starting in 2006, and senior contributing editor for Punch. He has been a wine columnist for msnbc.com and Seattle Magazine, and has written for publications such as Food & Wine, The New York Times, The Art of Eating, Saveur and Decanter.

Bonné wrote for the pioneering Urban Desires webzine in the mid-1990s. Prior to his engagement as San Francisco Chronicle wine editor, Bonné published the now defunct wine and food blog, amuse-bouche.net since 2004. He received awards from the James Beard Foundation for his Chronicle work in 2011 and 2007, and has been a Beard finalist for his writing nine other times. He also has won the Roederer Award numerous times for his wine writing, as well as several awards from the Association of Food Journalists.

In 2013, Bonné began writing a column for Decanter, and was named the USA Regional Chair for the Decanter World Wine Awards.

In March 2015, he left a full-time position as the Chronicle's wine editor, and joined Punch.

He published his first book, The New California Wine, in November 2013. The book was based in part on a 2010 article he wrote for Saveur and reflected his years of work at the Chronicle, as a transplant from the East Coast in 2006, confronting what at the time he found to be "the shortfalls of California wine: a ubiquity of oaky, uninspired bottles and a presumption that bigger was indeed better." It defined a new generation of California winemakers as those with "an enthusiasm for lessons learned from the Old World, but not the desire to replicate its wines; a mandate to seek out new grape varieties and regions; and, perhaps most important, an ardent belief that place matters."

The New California Wine was generally well received. The New York Times wrote that "Mr. Bonné has been positioned perfectly to observe the profound pendulum swing in style and attitude that has occurred among California winemakers over the last decade." In the Financial Times, Jancis Robinson wrote that the types of wines in the book "presented a completely different and refreshing face of America’s wine state." One writer concluded that the book relied too much on broad, sweeping generalizations of the wine industry and that the trend had been an ongoing process for years. In September 2014, it won the Louis Roederer award for International Wine Book of the Year. It was also shortlisted for the Andre Simon awards for food and drink books, and for a James Beard Award.

Bonné's second book, The New Wine Rules, was published in November 2017. It was a more entry-level wine book, and was again generally well-received as "a myth-busting guidebook" of basic wine advice. The New York Times wrote that Bonné had succeeded "in extracting the answers from decades of overwrought expert instruction and presenting them in a clear, easygoing manner."

Bonné's third book, The New French Wine, was released in March 2023. His publisher described the book as "a tour through every wine region of France, featuring some 800 producers and more than 7,000 wines." In a column,The New York Times' chief wine critic Eric Asimov wrote that it was "not a reference book, but something better: an opinionated, thought-provoking work that uses wine as a vehicle for cultural history," and that "Mr. Bonné has done a beautiful job shining the light" on the French wine industry. The Wall Street Journal said the book "isn't just beautifully designed and photographed but also deeply researched." In April 2024, it won the Andre Simon Award, and was shortlisted for a James Beard Award.

In November 2025, The New French Wine was translated and released in a French edition, Le nouveau vin français, by Hachette Pratique. By that point, the original edition had received positive reviews from French media as well. The sommelier Pascaline Lepeltier wrote in La Revue du vin de France that it was "the most complete and stimulating work I've ready about my country in a long time," while Le Figaro had asked, "Could the greatest expert on French wines be ... American?"

Bonné is a graduate of Phillips Exeter Academy (class of 1990) and Columbia University (class of 1994). He grew up in New York City and Pound Ridge, New York.

== See also ==
- List of wine personalities
