= SOMM TV =

American food and wine streaming network

SOMM TV is a food and wine streaming network launched in 2019.

The network shows original films, such as SOMM, SOMM: Into the Bottle, SOMM 3, and The Delicacy as well as original series productions and educational content. It also shows licensed wine and food content such as Bottle Shock and Supersize Me.

Verticals, which features vintages that defined a winery or winemaker, premiered at the Napa Valley Film Festival in fall 2019. In 2021 the service released a documentary titled Verticals: Lafite Rothschild. The program is narrated by Éric and Saskia de Rothschild.

In April 2020, the documentary A Chef's Voyage, which had been slated for a traditional release, instead premiered on SOMM with rental fees going to the LEE Initiative's Restaurant Workers Relief Program to support those laid off because of the COVID pandemic.

In 2021 it released a new reality TV competition show, Sparklers. It was nominated for a 2022 James Beard Foundation Award in the Reality or Competition Visual Media category. Production was set to begin on a second season in spring 2023 with Joel McHale as a guest judge.

In February 2022, it premiered Saving The Restaurant, which followed Colorado restaurateur Bobby Stuckey as he tried to help restaurants avoid closure during the pandemic. When Stuckey's own restaurants close, Stuckey helped form the Independent Restaurant Coalition.

In June 2022 it premiered The Whole Animal. It won a James Beard Award in 2023 in the Visual Media - Long form category.

In July 2022 it released Auction Lot 288, the story of the world's most expensive Champagne, featuring a bottle of 1874 Perrier-Jouët.

The Oldest Vine was released in December 2022 and tells the story of a more than 200 year old vine, still producing wine in Los Angeles at Mission San Gabriel.

== External resources ==
- SOMM TV Official Website
