= Sparklers (TV series) =

Cooking competition TV show

Sparklers is a cooking competition show produced by SOMM TV. It was nominated for a James Beard Award in 2022.
