= The Dauphin (Star Trek: The Next Generation) =

- Star Trek: The Next Generation episode
- Episode no.: Season 2 Episode 10
- Directed by: Rob Bowman
- Written by: Scott Rubenstein; Leonard Mlodinow
- Production code: 136
- Original air date: February 20, 1989

Guest appearances
- Paddi Edwards – Anya; Jaime Hubbard – Salia; Whoopi Goldberg – Guinan; Colm Meaney – Miles O'Brien; Peter Neptune – Aron; Mädchen Amick – Young Anya; Cindy Sorensen – Furry Animal; Jennifer Barlow – Gibson

Episode chronology
← Previous "The Measure of a Man"	Next → "Contagion"
- Star Trek: The Next Generation season 2

"The Dauphin" is the tenth episode of the second season of the American science fiction television series Star Trek: The Next Generation, the 36th episode overall. It was originally released on February 20, 1989, in broadcast syndication.

Set in the 24th century, the series follows the adventures of the Starfleet crew of the Federation starship Enterprise-D. In this episode, the Enterprise must transport a young head of state to the planet she is to lead.

== Plot ==
The Federation starship Enterprise, under the command of Captain Jean-Luc Picard, is assigned to transport the beautiful Salia, future ruler of Daled IV and her governess Anya, from a planet to which she has voluntarily exiled herself. Her parents, rulers of two opposing factions on Daled IV, have died and Salia represents a chance to unify the two factions. Anya is fiercely protective of her.

On board, Salia meets young Acting Ensign Wesley Crusher, who instantly becomes smitten. Wesley receives courtship advice from the crew members (including Worf, who explains that with Klingons it consists of "the male grunting and growling, followed by the female bellowing and hurling heavy objects, as the male reads love poetry"). The two young people bond. He introduces her to Thalian chocolate mousse, and takes her to the holodeck to show her several other worlds after she expresses an interest in exploring the galaxy.

Anya, touring the ship, first gives advice on warp engines and then discovers a crew member with a virulent disease being in a containment field in sick bay. She demands the crew member be killed to protect Salia. The Chief Medical Officer, Dr. Pulaski, refuses and insists the disease is contained but Anya transforms into a large monstrous form, easily matching Worf's strength when he tries to intervene. When Captain Picard arrives, Anya reverts to her petite humanoid form and defiantly explains her actions. Dr. Pulaski identifies Anya as an allasomorph, a shapeshifter, who could present a danger for the crew. Picard orders Anya to be confined to quarters and Worf, as head of security, promises Anya he will watch over Salia.

Picard, aware of Wesley's attraction to Salia, asks him to stay away from her, to which he agrees. At night, as Anya is sleeping, Salia slips out of their quarters and visits Wesley and the two share a kiss. They are interrupted when Anya bursts into his quarters in her beast form. To Wesley's horror, Salia also transforms into a similar beast, holding Anya at bay. Both revert to their human forms as security arrives. Later, Salia attempts to apologize to Wesley for her deception but Wesley, appalled by seeing Salia's appearance was not the real her, is too upset and refuses to listen.

The Enterprise arrives at Daled IV with no further incidents. As Salia prepares to depart, Anya reveals she will not be going with her, instead returning to her home on an orbiting moon. Anya also warns her that she will likely be unable to leave the planet once she has taken the leadership role. Salia thanks Anya for her upbringing before Anya departs. Just before Salia is to be beamed down to the planet, Wesley arrives to say his goodbyes, bringing her one last taste of chocolate mousse. Salia thanks him, and transforms into her natural form, a luminous figure of energy, before she is beamed down to the planet.

== Reception ==
Keith R.A. DeCandido rated the episode 3 out of 10.

In February 2019, Den of Geek noted "The Dauphin" as including awkward romantic elements, with Wesley ignoring (normally obvious) concerns because of his crush-like emotions towards the visiting alien.
