= Paddi Edwards =

British actress (1931–1999)

- Born: 9 December 1931; Bristol, England
- Died: 18 October 1999 (aged 67); Encino, California, U.S.
- Occupation: Actress
- Years active: 1956–1999

Paddi Penelope Edwards (December 9, 1931 – October 18, 1999) was a British actress. She worked steadily in film and television.

== Career ==
She found a niche in television movies, and toward the end of her life, doing voice work in projects for Disney, such as the roles of Flotsam & Jetsam in The Little Mermaid franchise.

Across a career spanning many live-action and voice-acting performances, she worked on Ghostbusters (in which she provided the voice of Gozer the Gozerian), 101 Dalmatians, Hercules, and Pepper Ann. Paddi played Nostradamus "Bull" Shannon's mother Henrietta "Hank" Shannon on two episodes of Night Court: Season 8, episode 15 "Mama Was a Rollin' Stone" and season 9, episode 10 "Get Me to the Roof on Time". She also played the role of Anya on the Star Trek: The Next Generation episode "The Dauphin" (season 2, episode 10). She also appeared as a secretary on Murphy Brown (season 2, episode 5).

== Death ==
Edwards died of respiratory failure and a heart attack on October 18, 1999, aged 67, at her home in Encino, California.

== Partial filmography ==
=== Film ===
Year	Title	Role	Notes
1960	Inn for Trouble	Deirdre	
1978	Corvette Summer	Loop Gaffer	
1982	Halloween III: Season of the Witch	Secretary	
1983	To Be or Not to Be	Pub Waitress	
1984	Ghostbusters	Gozer	Voice
1984	Fatal Vision	Perry MacDonald	
1986	Blue City	Kate	
1986	Stewardess School	Older Woman	
1987	Surrender	Judge	
1989	The Little Mermaid	Flotsam & Jetsam	Voice
1997	The Brave Little Toaster to the Rescue	Lab Computer	Voice
1997	Hercules	Atropos	Voice
1998	The Brave Little Toaster Goes to Mars	Satellite 1	Voice
2000	An Extremely Goofy Movie	Receptionist at Office (posthumous final role)	Voice

=== Television ===
Year	Title	Role	Notes
1957	Hancocks Half Hour		Episode: “There's an airfield at the bottom of my garden”
1988	Cheers	Sylvia	Episode: “Woody For Hire Meets Norman of the Apes”
1989	Star Trek: The Next Generation	Anya	Episode: "The Dauphin"
1991	Night Court	Henrietta "Hank" Shannon	2 episodes
1992	Batman: The Animated Series	Maggie Page	Voice, episode: "Eternal Youth"
1994–1996	Phantom 2040	Gorda	Voice, 7 episodes
1997–2000	Pepper Ann	Vera Groober-Schwartz	Voice, 18 episodes
