= Alpana Singh =

American Master Sommelier, restaurateur and local television personality

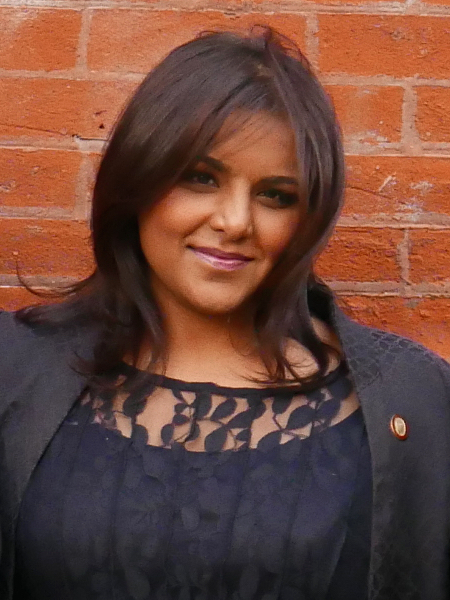
Singh in 2015

Alpana Singh (born November 1976) is an American Master Sommelier, restaurateur and local television personality in Chicago, Illinois.

== Early life ==
Singh was born and raised in Monterey, California to Indo-Fijian parents who emigrated from Fiji to California. The family owned and ran an ethnic grocery store. Her father was a chef for 30 years.

== Career ==
Singh's first job in the restaurant business outside the family business was as a waitress at Bakers Square. After an aborted attempt to join the US Air Force (due to a failed medical exam), she applied for a job at a fine dining restaurant but needed better background on wines. She self-educated and re-applied for the job, impressing the interviewer, who hired her and encouraged her to continue her studies. She became a sales clerk at Nielsen Bros. Market in Carmel, California which further exposed her to the wine business.

Singh passed the Court of Master Sommeliers' advanced certification test at age 21. In 2003, she passed the final exam to become the youngest woman ever to achieve the rank of Master Sommelier. (The master sommelier exam has an approximately 3% pass rate.)

Beginning at age 23, she served as sommelier at Chicago restaurant, Everest. She later became Director of Wine and Spirits for Lettuce Entertain You Enterprises, a large Chicago-based chain of restaurants.

Singh became especially well known for hosting the local Public Broadcasting Service (PBS) public television station WTTW's restaurant review show Check, Please! and her regular appearances on Chicago Tonight for the "Ask Alpana" segment on Thursday evenings. She replaced the original host of Check, Please!, Amanda Puck, in October 2003 and remained in that role until 2013, when she was replaced by Catherine De Orio. In 2018, however, Singh was reported to be returning to the show, signing a two-year contract.

Singh authored the 2006 book Alpana Pours: About Being a Woman, Loving Wine, and Having Great Relationships (ISBN 0-89733-546-5) and writes a column on wine for RedEye.

In December 2012, Singh opened The Boarding House, a wine-driven concept in the River North neighborhood. The four-story restaurant received national attention from Forbes Travel Guide (Top 40 Tastemakers), Food & Wine (Sommeliers of the Year), Market Watch, Sommelier Journal, Restaurant Hospitality, Midwest Living and others. Additional accolades include "100 Best Wine Restaurants" (Wine Enthusiast), "Pastry Chefs to Watch" (Time Out Chicago), "2013 Best New Restaurants" (Chicago Magazine), and nominations for best restaurant design from the Eater Awards and Jean Banchet Awards. Singh closed out the restaurant’s first successful year with an all-female culinary and beverage team, and the honor of Sommelier of the Year 2013 Wine Star award from Wine Enthusiast.

In 2014 and 2015, Singh appeared as a judge on the Food Network television show Food Truck Face Off. The television show premiered just prior to Singh running her first marathon and opening her second restaurant, Seven Lions, an American concept, located on Chicago's Michigan Avenue.

Singh sold her ownership in Seven Lions in October 2017 while preparing to run for public office (Cook County commissioner for the Third District), which she later decided against pursuing. According to Eater, Singh stated in July 2018 she sold ownership of both her restaurants The Boarding House and Seven Lions in October 2017. The Boarding House closed in July 2018. Singh still owns a third restaurant, Terra & Vine, in nearby Evanston, Illinois.

In late 2020, after The New York Times reported on a culture of sexual harassment within the Court that had persisted for years, Singh renounced her Master Sommelier title as a show of support for the women who had come forward.

== Personal life ==
In 2006, Singh married fiction writer Charles Blackstone; the couple divorced in 2014.

== Honors and accolades ==
- 2006 Wine & Spirits Professional of the Year by Bon Appetit magazine
- Best Sommelier in America by Wine and Spirits magazine
- Crain's Chicago Business 40 Under 40
- Food & Wine's 35 Under 35
- Best Sommelier (2004) by Chicago magazine
- 30 Under 30 (2006) by Jane magazine
