= Italian Sommelier Association =

Italian non-profit organization

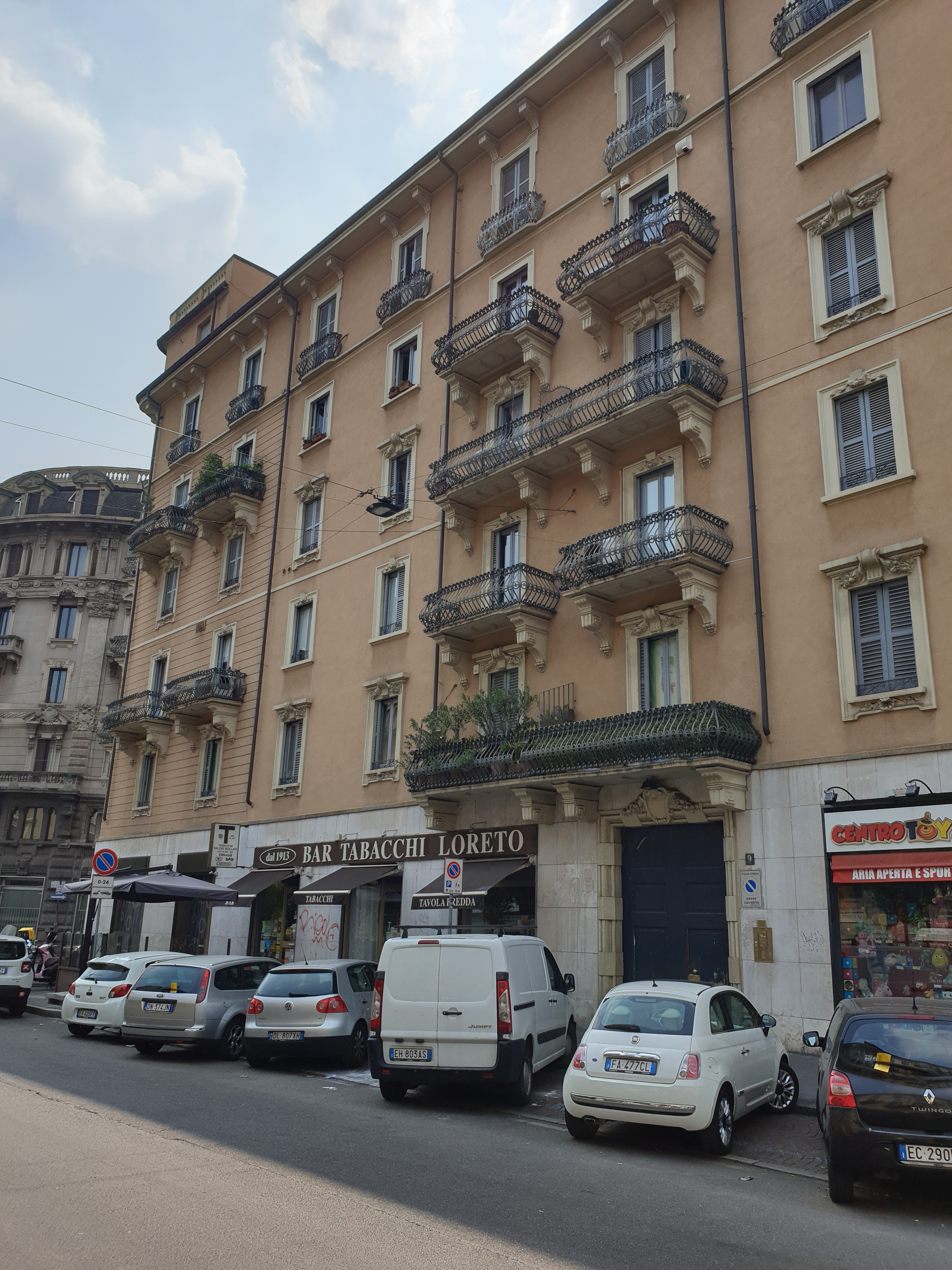
- Official Logo representing a Tastevin
- Founded: July 7, 1965
- Founder: Gianfranco Botti, Leonardo Guerra, Ernesto Rossi, Jean Valenti
- Type: Non profit, Educational, Cultural
- VAT ID no.: IT 11526700155
- Registration no.: 1494/176; 9401rep. / 1245racc.
- Location: Viale Monza, 9 - 20125 Milan, Italy
- Coordinates: 45°29′16″N 9°13′01″E
- Region served: International
- Key people: Antonello Maietta, President
- Affiliations: Worldwide Sommelier Association
- Website: aisitalia.it

Italian Sommelier Association (Associazione Italiana Sommelier, AIS) is an Italian non profit organization to promote the profession of sommeliers. It is one of the oldest and the largest sommelier associations in the world.

== History ==
The Italian Sommelier Association was founded in Milan on July 7, 1965, officially recognized and legally acknowledged by the Italian government on April 6, 1973, with formal President of the Republic decree #539 in 1973. Its founding members were Prof. Gianfranco Botti, Jean Valenti, Leonardo Guerra (tax advisor) and Italian sommelier Ernesto Rossi. The Italian Sommelier Association is part and founding member of the Worldwide Sommelier Association (WSA).

The AIS awarded the title of honorary sommelier to the pope Benedict XVI in 2006 and to the pope Francis in 2015.

== Description ==
The aim of the Italian Sommelier Association, as stated in the third article of its charter, is to qualify sommelier’s role and profession, therefore adding value to wine, traditional specialties and gastronomy culture. Its aim is also to promote, even in the legislative branch, the introduction of its didactic approach in hospitality related schools, as well as to endorse the sommelier's professional role, international recognition and esteem.

AIS features a main central office in Milan and many branches in each region of Italy. The Italian Sommelier Association organizes food & beverage activities such as guided wine tastings, seminars, dinners, visits to vineyards and wineries and cruises. It is also host and main partner to many official professional wine evaluations, services, consultings and exhibitions such as Vinitaly.

== Education ==
Diplomas & certificates issued by Italian Sommelier Association are officially recognized throughout the world, wherever WSA is present with an affiliate (United States, Canada, Mexico, Chile, Brazil, Peru, Caribbean, Singapore, Japan, South Korea, Slovenia, Russia, Latvia, Czech Republic, Denmark, San Marino, Scandinavia, Belgium, Germany, Italy, France, Switzerland, United Kingdom and Romania). Italian Sommelier Association exclusively teaches a three-level certified sommelier course which leads to the achievement of an AIS Sommelier Diploma (Silver). A professional sommelier qualification leading to an AIS Professional Sommelier Diploma (Gold) may be issued after candidate's career assessment as it is only intended for sommeliers actually working in a Food & Beverage establishment.

Qualifications overview and curriculum:

- AIS / WSA – Level 1 Course: wine tasting technique, viticulture, oenology, service technique
- AIS / WSA – Level 2 Course: complete Italian and international oenography: wine regions and sub-regions, grape varieties, wine styles, appellation systems.
- AIS / WSA – Level 3 Course: advanced wine-food pairing technique, wine & food categories, service technique
- AIS / WSA – Sommelier Diploma: AIS (Silver) Sommelier Diploma is released upon successful completion of all three levels and a two-days examination session, featuring written tests (two different tests), blind tasting and wine-food pairing assessment tests, didactic dinner, practical / service and final oral tests. Overall passmark is set to 60%.
- AIS / WSA – Professional Sommelier Diploma: AIS Professional (Gold) Sommelier Diploma, which is released by Italian Sommelier Association after candidate's career assessment.
- ALMA / AIS – Master Sommelier Diploma (Since 2009): this is a special course, designed "to put the finishing touches to the Sommelier’s training with specific preparation dedicated to the management and promotion of wine". It is either formally and informally considered the fourth level of Italian Sommelier Association education program.

== Governance ==
- Since 2022: Umbrian Sandro Camilli
- ...-2022: Antonello Maietta

== Published books ==
- Associazione Italiana Sommeliers (2002). Duemilavini 2003: Il libro guida ai vini d'Italia (in Italian). Bibenda. ISBN 978-8888439044.
- Associazione Italiana Sommelier (2011). Duemilavini 2012. Il libro guida ai vini d'Italia (in Italian). Bibenda. ISBN 978-8888439396.

== See also ==
- Master of Wine
- Wine accessory
- Court of Master Sommeliers
- Wine & Spirit Education Trust (WSET)
- Italian wine
- Vinitaly
