= The Whole Animal =

Food documentary

The Whole Animal is a documentary film created by the streaming service SOMM TV. The film is about dishes and cultures using all parts of an animal for food.
