= Wait for Your Laugh =

Wait For Your Laugh
- Directed by: Jason Wise
- Written by: Christina Wise; Jason Wise
- Produced by: Christina Wise; Jason Wise; Georgiana Guy Rodrigues; Diane Carpenter; David Carpenter; William Fowler; Debra Davis; Melissa Gail April Klein; Jackson Myers
- Starring: Rose Marie; Peter Marshall; Carl Reiner; Dick Van Dyke
- Cinematography: Jackson Myers
- Edited by: Jason Wise; Bryan Carr
- Production company: Forgotten Man Films
- Distributed by: Samuel Goldwyn Films
- Release dates: October 5, 2017 (Mill Valley); November 3, 2017 (United States)
- Running time: 126 minutes
- Country: United States

Wait for Your Laugh is a 2017 documentary film on the career of Rose Marie. The film was directed by Jason Wise and featured notable celebrities including Dick Van Dyke, Peter Marshall, and Carl Reiner.

The film premiered at the 2017 Mill Valley Film Festival, and was well received.

== Synopsis ==
Rose Marie's career spanned ninety years, starting at the age of three with a radio show and transitioning through vaudeville, Broadway, Vegas, movies and television. Interviews with Rose Marie as well as her costars Dick Van Dyke, Peter Marshall, Carl Reiner, and Tim Conway are interlaced with behind-the-scenes footage from shows and sets, including The Dick Van Dyke Show, and personal home movies from the iconic actress.

== Reviews ==
On review aggregate website Rotten Tomatoes, the film holds an approval rating of 89%, based on 19 critical reviews with a weighted average score of 7.43/10. Harvey Dennis with Variety saying, "As lively and likable as its subject, Jason Wise’s documentary 'Wait for Your Laugh' pays fond tribute to a tireless trooper whom generations have known mostly as a wisecracking second banana often funnier than the bigger stars she supported." The Hollywood Reporter called it, "A loving doc that will open the eyes of youngsters who know her only from The Dick Van Dyke Show if they know her at all."
