= Chambers (restaurant) =

New American restaurant in New York City

- Interactive map of Chambers

Restaurant information
- Established: June 2022
- Manager: Jared David
- Head chef: Jonathan Karis
- Food type: New American
- Location: 94 Chambers Street, New York, New York, United States
- Coordinates: 40.7146°N 74.0075°W
- Website: chambers.nyc

Chambers is a New American restaurant in the Tribeca neighborhood of Manhattan, New York City, located at 94 Chambers Street. It opened in June 2022 as the successor to Racines NY, which had operated in the same space since 2014. The restaurant is run by chef Jonathan Karis and general manager Jared David, with sommelier Pascaline Lepeltier, a partner since the Racines era, directing a wine program of more than 2,000 selections that has been a finalist for the James Beard Foundation Award for Outstanding Wine and Other Beverages Program.

== History ==
In 2014, the location opened as Racines NY, a restaurant and wine bar extending the Paris wine bar Racines. It was founded by David Lanher, owner of the Paris original; David Lillie, owner of Chambers Street Wines; sommelier Arnaud Tronche; and chef Frédéric Duca, previously of L'Instant d'Or in Paris. Sommelier Pascaline Lepeltier became a partner in 2018. Racines NY operated intermittently during the COVID-19 pandemic and closed permanently in summer 2021, around the time chef Diego Moya, the fourth chef in the restaurant's history, departed.

Several of the former partners announced the successor restaurant, Chambers, in May 2022. Jonathan Karis, previously chef de cuisine at Gramercy Tavern under Michael Anthony, was hired to lead the kitchen, where he serves a seasonal menu.

== Wine program ==
Lepeltier serves as beverage director, overseeing a list of more than 2,000 wines with a focus on organic and natural producers. The New York Times has highlighted the list for both its depth and its affordability.

== Reception ==
Pete Wells reviewed Chambers for The New York Times in September 2022, a few months after its opening. The restaurant has been profiled by Eater New York, and its wine list was named among the best in Manhattan by Decanter and reviewed by Wine & Spirits. Chambers is listed in the Michelin Guide.

== Awards and recognition ==
- James Beard Foundation Award for Outstanding Wine and Other Beverages Program – finalist, 2026
- Ranked No. 29 in The New York Times' 100 Best Restaurants in New York City, 2026
- Included in Condé Nast Traveler's "The Best Meals Our Editors Ate in 2022"
