= The Delicacy =

2020 documentary film about sea urchin

- Directed by: Jason Wise
- Produced by: Christina Wise; Jason Wise; Jackson Myers; Eric Esrailian
- Starring: Stephanie Mutz; Harry Liquornik; Jim Marshall; Andrew Zimmern; Ray Isle
- Cinematography: Jackson Myers
- Edited by: Jason Wise; Jackson Myers
- Music by: Trevor Morris; Trey Toy
- Production company: Forgotten Man Films
- Distributed by: SOMM TV
- Release date: January 24, 2020
- Running time: 70 minutes
- Country: United States

The Delicacy is a 2020 documentary film about sea urchins and the divers who harvest them off the coast of Santa Barbara, California in the US. The film, directed by Jason Wise, premiered at the Santa Barbara International Film Festival in January 2020.

The film premiered worldwide on May 20, 2020 on SOMM TV.

== Synopsis ==
The Delicacy follows several sea urchin divers as they engage in their dangerous vocation off the coast of Santa Barbara.

== Cast ==
This film focuses on Santa Barbara sea urchin divers including Stephanie Mutz, Harry Liquornik, Jim Marshall, Wade Motyer, and Billy Eggers. Notable chefs also make appearances including Andrew Zimmern, Ray Isle, Justin Cogley, Kyle Connaughton, and Master Sommelier Yoon Ha.

== Reception ==
The film received positive reviews with Josh Board of Fox 5 San Diego giving the film 3.5 out of 5 stars and writing, "Yet even if you aren't going to ever try this, the documentary is fascinating to watch" and, "3 ½ stars out of 5 (if these were Michelin stars given to a restaurant, that would make this the Citizen Kane of documentaries)." LA Weekly called it, "a mouthwatering excursion featuring California's uni divers and the chefs who sing their praises," Hollywood Outbreak said, "If you thought a documentary about sea urchins would be boring, think again." and Larry Mantle on KPCC called it "a must see."
