= Somm: Into the Bottle =

- Theatrical release poster
- Directed by: Jason Wise
- Written by: Christina Wise; Jason Wise
- Produced by: Jackson Myers; Christina Wise; Jason Wise
- Starring: Ian Cauble; Brian McClintic; Dustin Wilson; DLynn Proctor
- Cinematography: Jackson Myers
- Edited by: Bryan Carr; Jackson Myers; Jason Wise
- Music by: Brian Carmody
- Production company: Forgotten Man Films
- Distributed by: Samuel Goldwyn Films
- Release dates: November 11, 2015 (Napa Valley Film Festival); January 29, 2016
- Running time: 90 minutes
- Country: United States

Somm: Into the Bottle is a 2015 wine documentary and a sequel to SOMM (2013). The film tells the story and history of wine through ten different bottles opened throughout the film in different chapters. Directed by Jason Wise, it premiered at the Napa Valley Film Festival and featured the main cast from the original SOMM film as well as additional notable people from the wine world.

The film was distributed by Samuel Goldwyn Films. A third film, SOMM 3, released in 2018.

== Synopsis ==
The movie, whose tagline is "Wine is simple. It's about everything," focuses on the story of wine around the world and how it is made. It covers ten different chapters using ten different wines that are opened throughout the film. The chapters include The Winemaker, The Vintage, The History, The Wars, The New World, The Cost, The Barrels, The Point Scores, The Sommelier, and The Memory. "In the second movie, I wanted to show why these people are obsessed," says film director, Jason Wise.

== Cast ==
The film features sommeliers Ian Cauble, Brian McClintic, Dlynn Proctor, and Dustin Wilson who all appeared in the first SOMM film. Additional cast includes notable people from the wine world such as Madeline Puckette, Sabato Sagaria, Rajat Parr, Fred Dame, Aubert De Villaine, Jean Trimbach, and Steve Matthiasson.

== Critical response ==
Somm: Into the Bottle received positive reviews, with the Hollywood Reporter calling the film "so packed with personality and fascinating details that viewers will be able to return repeatedly to the documentary without soon exhausting all that it has to offer." Decanter Magazine said, "This fascinating film is sure to entertain a broad and attentive audience." Great Northwest Wine said, "Somm: Into the Bottle is a marvelous film that lovingly reveals so much about the history and romance of vines and wines." Wine Searcher's reaction was, "Somm: Into the Bottle is not so much a sequel as a stand-alone introduction to the industry and culture of wine. In this way it is far more invested in everything wine than the first film, which was often more a foil for exploring ideas of passion, obsession, and what people do to excel – whatever the field. Into the Bottle is more heavily informative, but thankfully never feels like a quagmire of exposition."
