= Four Seasons Hotel St. Louis =

Hotel in St Louis, United States

Coordinates: 38.633854°N 90.184516°W

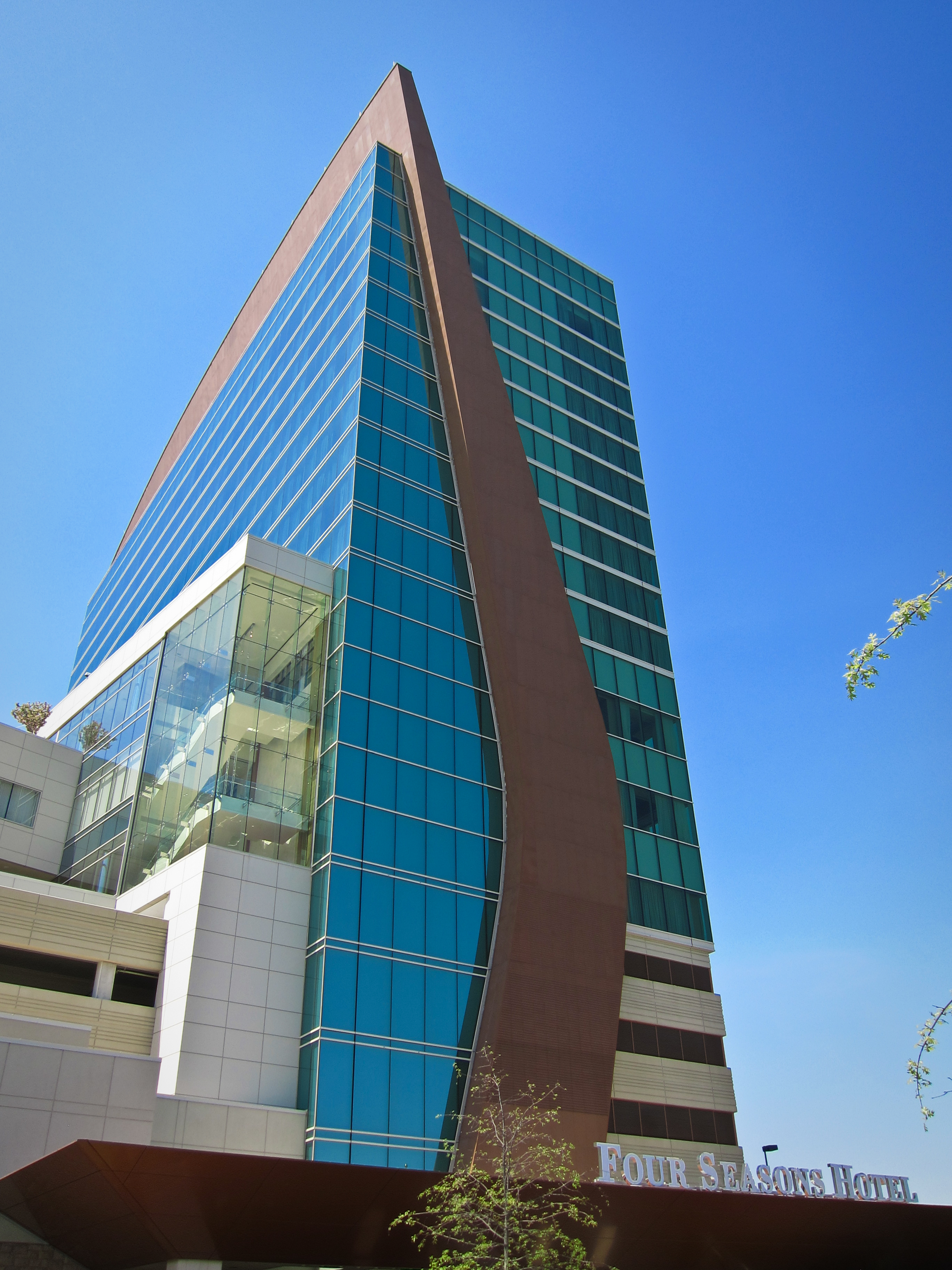
Four Seasons Hotel St. Louis

The Four Seasons Hotel St. Louis is a 5 star hotel located in downtown St. Louis, Missouri. It is well known for its luxury suites and extensive modern art collection said to be worth over $7 million. Due to its central location in the city, it is a popular destination for those attending events at Busch Stadium and the Enterprise Center. The hotel was designed by HOK.
