= Somm (film) =

- Theatrical release poster
- Directed by: Jason Wise
- Written by: Jason Wise
- Produced by: Jackson Myers; Christina Tucker; Jason Wise
- Starring: Ian Cauble; Brian McClintic; Dustin Wilson; DLynn Proctor
- Cinematography: Jackson Myers
- Edited by: Bryan Carr; Jackson Myers; Jason Wise
- Music by: Brian Carmody
- Production company: Forgotten Man Films
- Distributed by: Samuel Goldwyn Films (theatrical); First Run Features (DVD)
- Release dates: November 7, 2012 (Napa Valley Film Festival); June 21, 2013
- Running time: 94 minutes
- Country: United States
- Languages: English; Italian; German; French
- Box office: $170,561

Somm is a 2012 American documentary following the attempts of four candidates to pass the extremely difficult Master Sommelier examination, a test with one of the lowest pass rates in the world. Directed by Jason Wise, a sequel, Somm: Into the Bottle, was released in 2015 and a third film, Somm 3, came out in October 2018. A TV series based on the movie launched on the Esquire Network in November 2015. In 2019, SOMM TV was launched by creator Jason Wise with original shows.

== Synopsis ==
The film begins in the San Francisco Bay Area briefly touching on the history of wine and the existence of the prestigious Master Sommelier exam. The film’s main characters, Ian Cauble, Dustin Wilson, DLynn Proctor, and Brian McClintic are introduced along with their various family members, wives, and girlfriends who all vouch for just how invested they really are in preparing for their Master Sommelier diploma. Every one of them has a different motive for wanting to pass, whether it is for their wife’s sake, an obsession with the idea of passing, or simply wanting to be seen as the most dapper guy in a restaurant. The candidates repeatedly assert that they have to know everything about wine, while the film jumps back and forth between wine makers in the United States, Italy, France, and Germany to illustrate that knowing everything about wine is virtually impossible.

SOMM begins a countdown leading to the exam at the end of the film. With just three weeks left until the three-part exam (theory, service, and blind tasting), the audience begins to see the lifestyle this exam forces on its subjects. Common study techniques include tracing Internet maps for color-coding wine regions, making an absurd amount of flashcards, even Skyping with each other at 2:30AM for mock quizzes. They also begin practice tasting exams with current Master Sommeliers.

With 10 days left, tensions are high and everyone is on edge as each tries to cram the extensive history, geography, and culture of wine into their brain before exam day that takes place in Dallas, Texas. The candidates' emotions are mixed with hope and fear as their mentors give them one last impossibly hard round of situational testing in service and tasting, including an exercise in just how fast one can get a bottle of wine cold. During a practice tasting with a Master Sommelier, Ian Cauble becomes convinced that someone has switched his wines. Brian speculates on the worst-case scenario of two of the three close friends becoming a Master Sommelier, leaving one behind who must continue training alone.

When everyone finally arrives in Dallas for the test, Dustin Wilson decides to room with another candidate named Sabato Sagaria, leaving Brian McClintic to room with Ian. Ian Cauble comes prepared with a suitcase full of 16 pounds of wine for review. They all spend 6- to 10-hour days tasting, studying flashcards, and speculating on each other’s sanity. Ian Cauble stays up the entire night studying flash cards as his stress level builds. At the end of the movie Brian and Dustin end up passing and are welcomed into the organization, leaving DLynn and Ian on the outside and realizing Brian’s worst-case scenario.

In a coda to the film, one year later Ian reattempts the exam and becomes the 197th Master Sommelier, and DLynn is still busy studying.

== Cast ==
The four candidates appearing as themselves are Ian Cauble, Brian McClintic, Dustin Wilson and DLynn Proctor. In addition to friends and family members, several notable sommeliers are interviewed, including Fred Dame, Peter Neptune, Michael Jordan and Geoff Kruth.

== Critical response ==
The film received mostly positive reviews. Esquire Magazine's Cal Fussman praised the film as "...a great film.." "..with a tense arc that pushes you to the edge of your seat...". Review aggregation website Rotten Tomatoes gives the film a score of 79% based on reviews from 24 critics, with an average rating of 6.7/10. Variety called the film "A stimulating intro course on wine appreciation" and praised its "accessible subjects and sparkling execution". The LA Times' critic Kenneth Turan called the film "glib but ultimately engaging." The NY Post praised the film for doing "..a fairly impressive job of making wine tasting somewhat cinematic despite its being essentially unfilmable." The NY Times' critic Rachel Saltz called the film "less about wine fetishism than about the fetishism of mastery" but felt the candidates were painted as "one dimensional jocks". She did note that the film was "an entree into a little-known world."

== Awards ==
The film was named best documentary feature at the 2013 San Luis Obispo Film Festival.

== Sequels ==
In January 2015, distributor Samuel Goldwyn Films announced they had acquired exclusive rights to a sequel entitled Somm: Into the Bottle, with a theatrical release planned for later in the year. In November 2015, Somm: Into the Bottle debuted at the opening night of the 2015 Napa Valley Film Festival.

Somm 3 was released in the fall of 2018 by distributor Samuel Goldwyn Films.

The fourth installment in the Somm series "Somm 4: Cup of Salvation" was released on June 28, 2024. The film studies the role of wine in human history and its relationship to the land.

=== Uncorked: The TV series ===
In March 2015, Esquire Network announced that one of its series for the 2015 season would be a TV series with a working title Somm, following six aspiring master sommeliers from New York as they prepare for the Court of Master Sommeliers exam. The show, renamed Uncorked, debuted on November 10, 2015.

== See also ==
- 2018 Master Sommelier exam cheating scandal
- Blind wine tasting
