= Midwest Living =

Regional American magazine

- Editorial Content Director: Kylee Krizmanic
- Frequency: Quarterly
- Total circulation: 800,792 (2024)
- Founded: 1986
- Company: People Inc.
- Country: United States
- Based in: Des Moines, Iowa
- Language: English
- Website: www.midwestliving.com
- ISSN: 0889-8138

Midwest Living is a regional American magazine published by Dotdash Meredith focused on the American Midwest. Founded in 1986, the magazine publishes region-specific information and inspiration, focusing on travel and events, food and dining, and home and garden, as well as other editorial content categories.

Headquartered in Des Moines, Iowa, Midwest Living magazine is published quarterly and reaches 4.1 million readers, primarily in the 12 Heartland states (Illinois, Indiana, Iowa, Kansas, Michigan, Minnesota, Missouri, Nebraska, North Dakota, Ohio, South Dakota and Wisconsin).

== Midwest Living leadership ==
Kylee Krizmanic is the editorial content director of Midwest Living. Previously, Krizmanic served as the magazine's creative director. She is the brand's first female editor-in-chief.

Trevor Meers was editor-in-chief of Midwest Living until March 2019. Previously, Meers was the managing editor of Midwest Living.

Greg Philby was editor-in-chief of Midwest Living until April 2015. Previously, Philby was the executive editor of Midwest Living for five years where he was responsible for the overall editorial execution.

Dan Kaercher is the founding editor of Midwest Living. Kaercher is well known for his IPTV/PBS series Best of the Midwest, Taste of the Midwest and Parklands of the Midwest. These franchises each included a public television special and series, book by Globe Pequot (a division of Morris Communications) and special magazine issue.

Tom E. Benson was the founding publisher of "Midwest Living".

Mary-Beth Rouse is the magazine's creative director.

=== Other editors ===
- Hannah Agran, Executive Editor
- Julia Sayers Gokhale, Travel Editor
