= Pascaline Lepeltier =

French sommelier (born 1981)

Pascaline Lepeltier (born January 9, 1981) is a French sommelier, author, and restaurant owner based in New York City. Born in Anjou, France, she is known for her advocacy of organic wine and biodynamic wine. She has worked at L'Auberge Bretonne, Rouge Tomate and later at Racines NY and Chambers.

In 2018, Lepeltier became the first woman to win both the Meilleur Ouvrier de France title in the sommelier category and the Best Sommelier of France competition. She represented France at the 2026 Best Sommelier of the World competition. She authored the book One Thousand Vines in 2024.

== Early life and education ==
Lepeltier was born in Anjou, France, in the Loire Valley. She had her first sip of wine at the age of 2 or 3. She earned her master's degree in philosophy from Nantes University in 2001, and later completed her sommelier and hospitality master's degrees at the CFA in Angers, France, in 2005.

== Career ==
She worked as an assistant sommelier at L'Auberge Bretonne in La Roche-Bernard. She then joined Rouge Tomate in Brussels as beverage director. She later launched Rouge Tomate's New York operation. She started on a temporary assignment and then as wine director. She supported sustainable winemakers and organic wines. The wine program received positive reviews. The restaurant's cellar received the 2017 World of Fine Wine award for Best Long Wine List in the World. She passed the Master Sommelier qualification in 2014. She left Rouge Tomate in 2017 after the restaurant decided to reduce its wine program.

In 2018, she became a founding partner at Racines NY. Racines merged into Chambers. She is currently the co-owner and wine adviser at Chambers restaurant in New York City. She is consulted on natural wines. She has covered Chenin blanc.

== Awards and recognition ==
In 2015, Bon Appétit called her a sommelier to watch.

In 2018, she obtained the titles of Meilleur Ouvrier de France in the sommelier category and Best Sommelier of France. She is the first woman to win each of these two national competitions.

In 2024, she was called a rising star by Decanter (magazine). In 2026, she was the representative of France for the Best Sommelier of the World competition. Her book "One Thousand Vines" was called one of the best wine books of 2024 by the The New York Times.

== Writings ==
=== Articles ===
- "The nose can be deceived, but the mouth much less so," Decanter (January 2025)

=== Books ===
- "One Thousand Vines," (October 2024)

== See also ==
- Court of Master Sommeliers
