= Somm 3 =

SOMM 3
- Directed by: Jason Wise
- Written by: Christina Wise; Jason Wise
- Produced by: Jackson Myers; Christina Wise; Jason Wise
- Starring: Dustin Wilson; Fred Dame; Steven Spurrier; Jancis Robinson; Laura Maniec; Pascaline Lepeltier; Sabato Sagaria; Aldo Sohm
- Cinematography: Jackson Myers
- Edited by: Bryan Carr; Jackson Myers; Jason Wise
- Music by: Trevor Morris
- Production company: Forgotten Man Films
- Distributed by: Samuel Goldwyn Films
- Release date: November 30, 2018
- Running time: 78 minutes
- Country: United States

Somm 3 is the third film in the SOMM documentary series, following 2013's SOMM and 2015's SOMM: Into the Bottle. Directed by Jason Wise and distributed by Samuel Goldwyn Films, SOMM 3 centers on two tastings reminiscent of the 1976 Judgment of Paris.

== Synopsis ==
Narrated by Wine Folly's Madeline Puckette, SOMM 3 centers on two tastings reminiscent of the 1976 Judgment of Paris. The first tasting takes place at Verve in New York with Dustin Wilson, from the first two films, organizing the event. Participants include Laura Maniec, Pascaline Lepeltier, Sabato Sagaria, and Aldo Sohm. The blind tasting involves six Pinot Noir wines from around the world.

The film goes back and forth from the tasting in New York to a tasting in Paris featuring three notable individuals in the wine world: Fred Dame, Jancis Robinson, and Steven Spurrier. The three bring forward bottles from their careers and open them as they discuss wine and significant moments.

Meanwhile, in New York, the wines are ranked prior to the reveal of the names and the top wines are then taken to the second tasting in Paris, ready to be judged a second time by Fred, Jancis and Steven.

== Cast ==
This third installment in the SOMM series continues with Ian Cauble, Brian McClintic, Dustin Wilson and DLynn Proctor along with Fred Dame, Jancis Robinson, Steven Spurrier, Laura Maniec, Pascaline Lepeltier, Sabato Sagaria, and Aldo Sohm.

== Critical response ==
The film was well received with the Hollywood Reporter saying, "Closely examining the evaluation of wines from critical, hospitality and commercial perspectives, the pic takes the famed “Judgment of Paris” tasting event (amusingly portrayed in 2008's Bottle Shock) as its departure point to explore the varied, and often subjective, characteristics that make great wines memorable and often very valuable." Decanter said, "This film serves to remind us that wine is subjective and deeply personal; it’s not about scores and ratings or price tag, but about who you’re with, where you are, and how you feel in the moment you taste it." Eater.com said, "The ‘Somm’ Franchise Gets Better With Age."
