= Alec Steele =

British blacksmith and YouTuber (born 1997)

- Born: 16 November 1997 (age 29); Norwich, United Kingdom
- Occupations: Blacksmith, youtuber

Instagram information
- Page: AlecSteele
- Years active: 2014 (Note: First public post on his Instagram account was on 6 January 2014.)–present
- Followers: 343 thousand

YouTube information
- Channel: AlecSteele
- Years active: 2011 (Note: First public post on his YouTube account was on 27 April 2011.)–present
- Genres: Blacksmithing; machining; restoration; documentary
- Subscribers: 3.3 million
- Views: 671 million
- Last updated: 5 November 2026
- Website: www.asteeleblock.com

Alec Steele (born 16 November 1997) is a British blacksmith and YouTuber. His videos follow both vlog and documentary formats when focusing on blacksmithing, machining, restoration, and other adjacent trades. He has been received positively, often referenced as an inspiration for aspiring metalsmiths and YouTube star.

Steele began blacksmithing at the age of 11, which he started a business for at the age of 16. Despite uploading short videos in 2011, he would take up learning videography to promote his products and sell courses shortly after, amassing a following of 200,000 by YouTube subscribes by 2017. In July of that year he would appear in a short segment of Forged in Britain, aired in between an episode of Forged in Fire.

Steele briefly moved into a larger workshop in Norwich in July 2017 before moving to a new workshop in Montana, US in November 2018. There, the History Channel reinvited Steele in 2018 to star in his own show, Forged with Steele. Producing videos with fellow blacksmithing friend Will Stelter in Montana for nearly two years, Steele would go on to move back to his same Norwich workshop in 2020, where he has worked and produced videos in since. Shortly after his move back to the UK, Forged with Steele was announced to run a second season, which aired in early 2021.

Steele is the owner of his own self-titled business, which increasingly sold products crafted in his videos, alongside blacksmithing themed merchandise. He also owns the Alec Steele Company which formerly sold shop tools and equipment and continued to sell merchandise.

== Early life and education ==
Steele was born on 16 November 1997 in Norwich, England, United Kingdom—the same place he grew up and would go on to start his blacksmithing and internet career. Before starting his blacksmithing career, Steele said he never played with metal more than creating spears with "chromed steel pipe" and "broomsticks." His father, however, had picked up woodworking two years before Steele's birth and was an avid hobbyist, encouraging Steele to the act of making.

=== Blacksmithing beginnings and dropping out of school ===
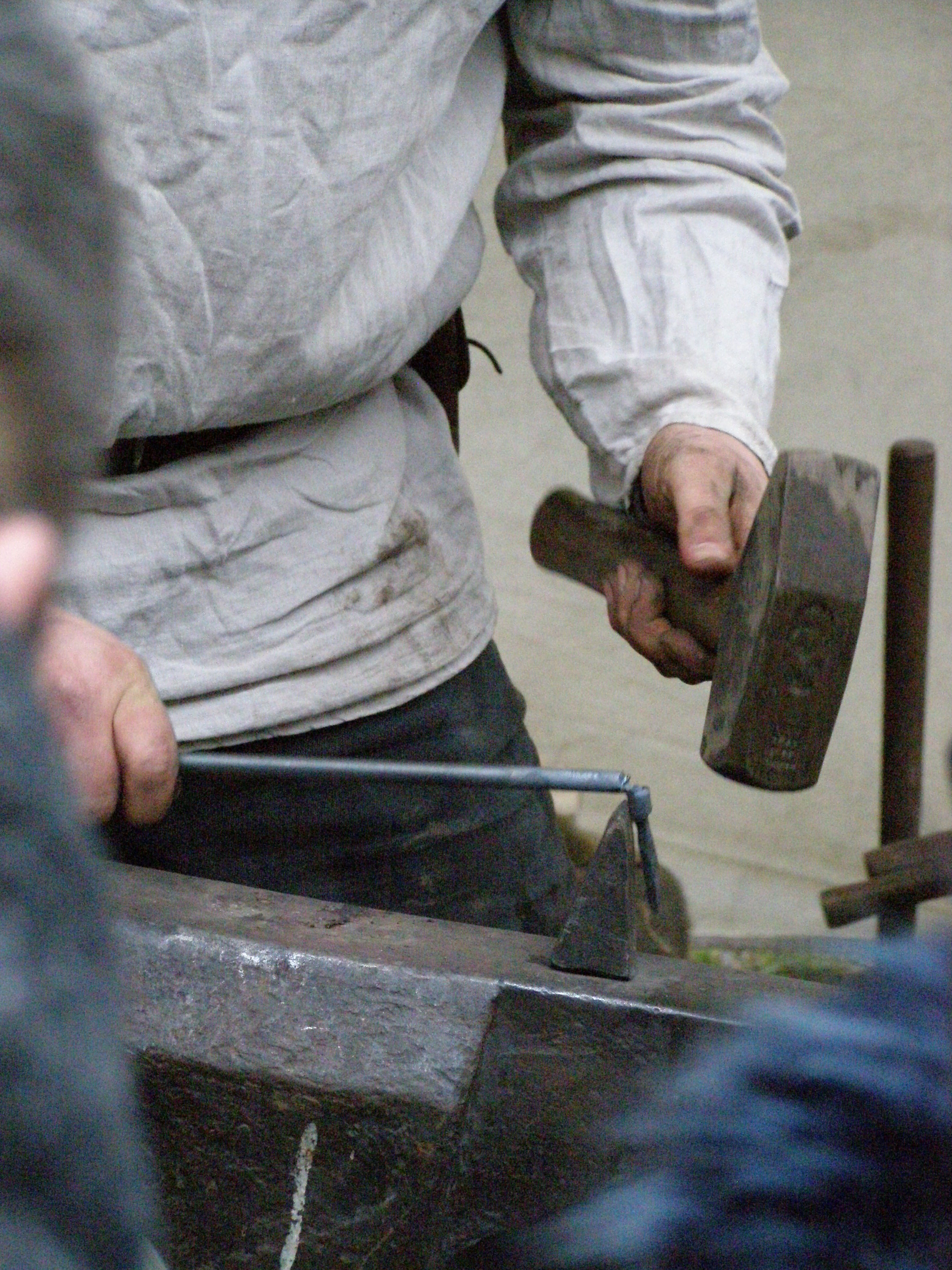
A blacksmith leading a forging demonstration at a local fair

Steele became first enamoured with blacksmithing at the age of 11, when he attended a local Norwich county fair's demonstration at a forge. He said the fire, big tools, and practicality appealed to him, noting having watched the smith forge a metal leaf. Using materials from around his home, Steele was supported by his parents and the smith he watched in building an at-home charcoal forge in his backyard, using a railroad track in lieu of an anvil. He would go on to buy his first anvil in 2009, taking over his early childhood, including taking lessons and learning basic construction and metalworking skills from his father. Steele dropped out of secondary school at the age of 16 to pursue his blacksmithing and YouTube career full-time, a passion he said he had been "so entrenched in." Steele said that his blacksmithing career was inspired by artistic metalworker Claudio Bottero, YouTuber This Old Tony, blacksmith Brian Brazeal, and bladesmith Mareko Maumasi. Steele knew Brazeal since a young age, working at his shop in his first YouTube video, uploaded on 27 April 2011.

== Blacksmithing and internet career ==
=== 2011–2017: Early YouTube video creation and Forged in Britain appearance ===
While Steele's first uploads to his YouTube channel began in 2011, he began to make more curated videos beginning in 2012, starting his business shortly after, at the age of 16. Seeing individuals making online video classes for other trades inspired Steele to begin learning videography skills—which he had briefly dabbled in since a young age, when his mother had bought his a DSLR camera—to make his own videos and some "passive income," including selling products he forged. He said he had gotten some inspiration from Casey Neistat's videography and editing style from his vlog format. Steele never believed these interests "would grow into being just a content creator," which would later become his primarily source of income.

Steele's logo under the Alec Steele Company in 2017 features a hammer with an early version of his touchmark

In 2017, Alec Steele—then creating content for 200,000 subscribers—was featured in the first episode of a five-episode, three-minute short series by the History Channel called Forged in Britain. It premiered on 1 June 2017, during an episode of another of the History Channel's television series, Forged in Fire. Asked about his participation therein, he expressed gratitude towards Forged in Fire for bringing popularity to the trade. Steele later added that while he personally did not watch much of the series, he saw it mentioned numerous times in his YouTube comment and fellow blacksmith, but believed it "must have had a massive effect... bringing it to the mainstream." Steele, who was uploading videos on a nearly daily basis during this period, was focusing on "techniques, projects, and equipment for blacksmithing" on his YouTube channel in a manner which was approachable for beginners. This included the forging of pieces made from Damascus steel, which Steele first featured on his channel in November 2015; since then, it has made numerous reappearances in his videos years later, in which Steele has pushed its limits, sometimes in unorthodox ways. During this period of time, he also ran a livestream series called The Alec Steele Show which ran for 44 episodes from June 2016 to 24 June 2017.

After noting how "small" his first workshop in Norwich was, Steele would buy a new workshop he began to make videos in starting in July 2017. He would go on to hire full time crew member and videographer, Jamie Popple, in September after Popple had done some editing and video work in the months prior.

=== 2018–2019: Move to Montana and Forged with Steele Season 1 and 2 ===
As Steele began to amass a rapidly growing following, he and Popple moved from the UK to a Montana workshop with Steele's longtime friend and fellow blacksmith and bladesmith, Stelter, in November 2018.

Uploading videos to an audience of over 300,000 subscribers in 2018, Steele was featured in a follow-up series commissioned by the History Channel, Forged with Steele—premiered in October 2018—in which his "remarkable and captivating talents" would be displayed in his smithing of modern and historic combat weaponry. In July 2020, it was announced that History Channel's broadcasting company, A+E Networks, had commissioned Studio71 to bring back Steele—having amassed a much greater following of over 2 million YouTube subscribers—for a second series of Forged with Steele which premiered in early 2021. The second season took place in his Montana workshop, which Steele said he was "so excited for the launch of" as he believed he had "advanced [his] blacksmithing skills and begun learning the art of gem-setting, inlaying, and engraving so [he could recreate incredible] pieces of history with even more detail." Stelter would also appear in the series. Popple was a cinematographer for the second season of the series.

=== 2020–present: Move back to the UK, video game weaponry, and documentarianism ===
Steele's updated logo for the Alec Steele Company in 2020 features an updated version of his touchmark

Steele would move back to the UK in November 2020, where he would continue to make videos in the same, personal workshop he previously worked in.

On 8 June 2021, Steele published a video sponsored by Bethesda Softworks' MMORPG series, The Elder Scrolls Online, ahead of its Blackwood expansion in which he recreated the Glowing Sword wielded by one of the game's characters, Valkynaz Nokvroz. Steele said he had "always been fascinated by steel weapons, like swords and axes," which prompted him to take up Bethesda on the opportunity. He added the Glowing Sword was "one of the most challenging sword designs [he's] ever had to tackle," "from the glowing red element to the intricate scallops of the guard." In a video sponsored by Xbox's Game Pass, Steele built a war hammer for fellow YouTuber Jesse Cox in March 2022; Cox used it to break open a stone slab containing merchandise for the video game Total War: Warhammer III, which had released a month prior.

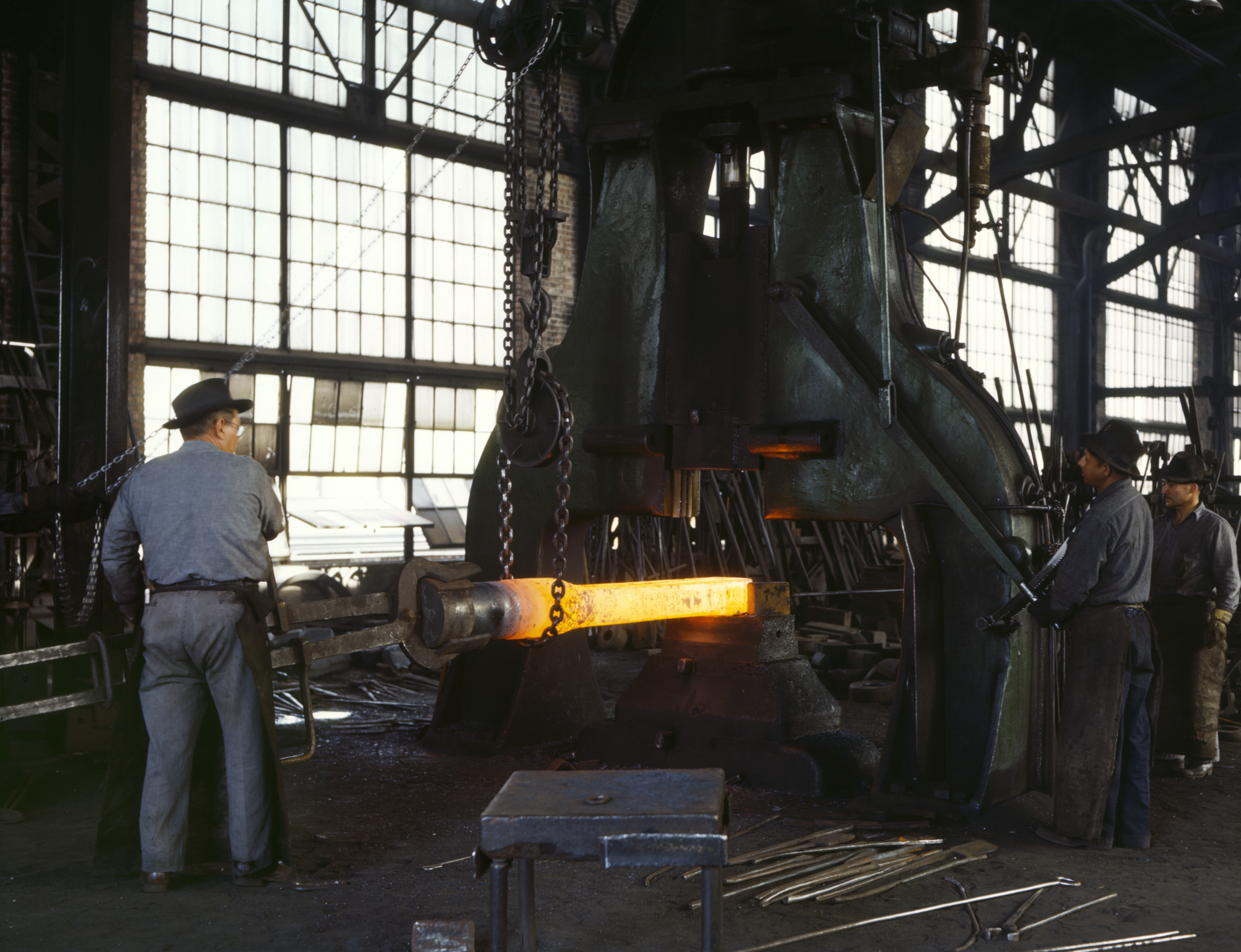
Railroad workers using a drop forge power hammer similar to the one Steele featured at W.H. Tildesley Ltd.

Beginning with an initial video on the East Coast Casting Co. in October 2021, where Steele appeared at the company's Norfolk location, Steele began to make documentary-style content often featuring his appearance with actual individuals in the respective trades covered. He is often accompanied by Popple, who has been described as Steele's "sidekick." In 2022, Steele mentioned in an interview that he had reached out into many other fields adjacent to blacksmithing which were of interest to him, so much so that he called himself a self-titled "generalist" in metalworking. Some of these practices included bending sheet metal and engraving. In October 2022, Steele visited and documented Tata Steel's blast furnaces, steelplant, casters, and hot mill in the Welsh town of Port Talbot. In March 2023, Steele visited M-Tek Glass, a family glassblowing business located in the town of King's Lynn in Norfolk specializing in handmade laboratory glassware. M-Tek's owner, Mark Crouch, said Steele messaged him "out of the blue" before they filmed the video in impromptu fashion. Crouch said Steele was "absolutely fantastic" in his brief foray into the trade, assuring that "it wasn't made up for the cameras" and that Steele "was actually enjoying it." In November, Steele visited W.H. Tildesley Ltd.—a closed-die drop forging company—in the market town of Willenhall in Wolverhampton, England to experience "the day-to-day role of a forge stamper," including using 3.2 and 1.6 metric ton Massey drop forging power hammers to make a firefighter's axe.

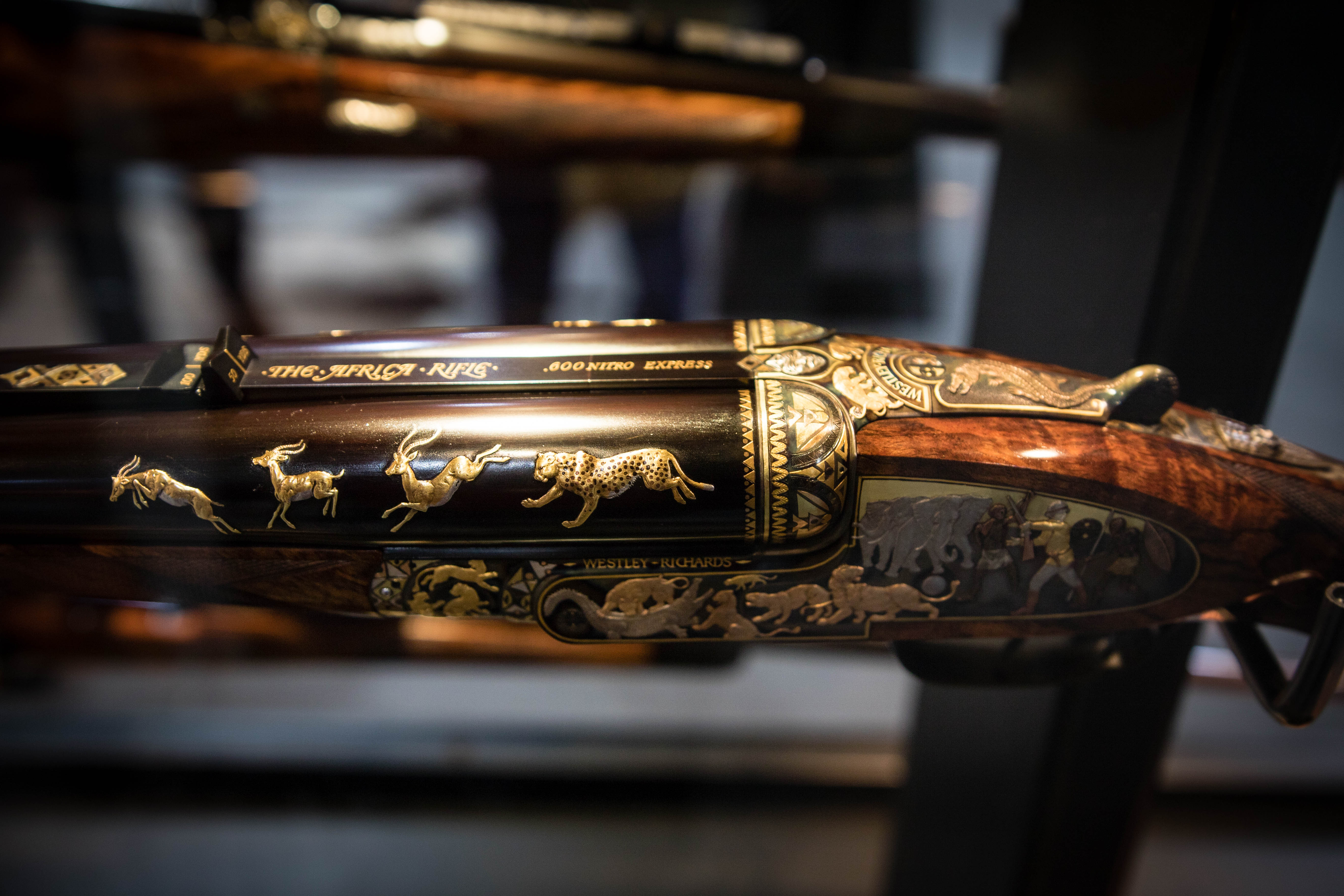
Example of a Westley Richards .600 Nitro Express rifle, featuring ornate engraving and inlay work

In May 2025, Steele visited the Westley Richards factory in Birmingham. Experienced in the use of firearms, Steele documented each step of the process of gunsmithing, focused on their signature and one-of-a-kind shotguns. At that point in time, Steele's audience was primarily 25-35 year-olds followed by 18-25 year-olds, which Westley Richards said it was "delighted" by when speaking to the interest of the youth in keeping alive specialized trades. Later that year, in September, Steele returned to Westley Richards to learn how to make a leather Bishop Bag. Although challenged, Steele was described as an "aficionado of bench-work," with Steele saying that "in another life, [he] would've loved to have been a leatherworker." In October of that year, Steele published a video in collaboration with Metallisation Ltd. in which he was hosted at one of the company's workshops in Birmingham to document to process of thermal spraying, a processes of coating materials, which was demonstrated in three main techniques featuring a gun which shoots molten metal propelled by compressed air. The first uses a propane flame melting a 1.6mm bronze wire, the second an arc created by the shorting of two zinc wires completing a 300-amp circuit, and the third a special tungsten carbide powdered material.

In December 2024, Steele pushed the limits of Damascus steel by designing its contrasting colors into the information held within a QR code. Beginning a month prior, Steele also tested methods of creating titanium Damascus in which he tested the forge welding of Grade 2 and 5 titanium to a 1080 steel core in argon-filled jackets to avoid scale. Steele separated the metals with interlayers of copper, nickel, silver, and gold foil—aimed to mitigate the production of intermetallic compounds between the titanium and steel which would not allow a forge weld to form. His interlayer experimentation was inspired by the 2018 paper Gallium-assisted diffusion bonding of stainless steel to titanium; microstructural evolution and bond strength, primarily authored by diffusion bonding researcher and Senior Lecturer In Materials Engineering at the Open University, Dr Amir Shirzadi—who Steele would later meet. This culminated in Steele's creation of a titanium Damascus billet, glasses, and an axe. In early 2026, Steele said that above all of his tools, he most valued his personal protective equipment, which he said he became "extremely committed" to—especially in the last one to two years prior—to "[set] the correct example." Steele appeared at the hobbyist and creator event, Makers Central, held in the National Exhibition Centre in Birmingham from 15 to 16 May 2026.

== Reception and legacy ==
Steele has inspired many to take up blacksmithing through his YouTube career, particularly by creating both free and paid instructional content which appeals to a do-it-yourself attitude at multiple skill levels. Addison Lee, a Burlington County, New Jersey 18-year-old senior attending Seneca High School in 2018 said that Steele was "relatable" in comparison to others he had seen online whose careers "seemed out of reach." Lee said Steele being a "master at his craft" at just 19 years old, "drove [him] to it" as there was no "excuse" not to. Later that year, Mark Campana of Bath, Ohio—who would go on to compete in an episode of Forged in Fire: Knife or Death—said he began his career by watching YouTube videos, buying basic tools, and making a "pile of really junky blades." Campana called Steele "amazing" after purchasing a $50 tutorial from Steele. In November 2019, bladesmith Robert Soria of Angleton, Texas said that Steele being "21 years old and a master smith" got him "fired up." Steele has commented that the best way he advised to get started blacksmithing is to "find a weekend blacksmithing class and get some knowledge," as he had, in order to "make contacts" and know what tools are needed.

Having held masterclasses and a blacksmithing career, Steele has been revered since his early years smithing and making YouTube videos. He has been labelled a "YouTube star," "whizkid," "legend," and "boy wonder" of the blacksmithing world. His videography and editing style have themselves been called "visually stunning, educational, and amusing".

== Filmography ==
Air date	Show	Channel	Role	Ref
2017	Forged in Britain	History Channel	Himself	
2018	Forged with Steele	History Channel	Himself	
2021	Forged with Steele	History Channel	Himself	
