= Court of Master Sommeliers =

International organization of wine professionals

- Formation: April 1977; 49 years ago
- Purpose: Examination board
- Headquarters: Torquay, UK
- Region served: Worldwide
- CEO: Ronan Sayburn
- President Emeritus: Gerard Basset
- Website: courtofmastersommeliers.org

The Court of Master Sommeliers (CMS) is an educational organisation established in 1977 to encourage improved standards of beverage service by sommeliers, particularly in wine and food pairing. From the court's inception through 2018, a worldwide total of 282 people have earned its Master Sommelier diploma, the highest level.

== History ==
Organisations of wine professionals in England date to the 12th century, when the Worshipful Company of Vintners is believed to have been established. It gained a royal charter in 1364; although its control over the wine industry was gradually loosened by deregulation, the company continued to have considerable influence within it. In 1953, the first six Masters of Wine were granted that title after passing an exam given by the company, and became heads of the Institute of Masters of Wine (IMW) established two years later.

The first Masters came from many different professions, but none worked in the service industry. Since the wine industry depended on knowledgeable service professionals to sell its products, they needed a way to train and recognize superior wine knowledge in that industry. It was also a way to rebuild the sommelier profession in the UK, which had dwindled since World War II.

The first Master Sommelier examination was held in the United Kingdom in 1969; the Court of Master Sommeliers was established in 1977 as an international examining body for sommeliers. It was set up under the supervision of the Vintners Company, the IMW, The British Hotels & Restaurants Association, The Wine & Spirit Association of Great Britain, and The Wholesale Tobacco Trade Association.

In 1984, Fred Dame was the first person to pass all three parts of the Master Sommelier examination at once, which is called "winning the Krug Cup".

In 1986 the first Master Sommelier exams were held in the United States. The American chapter of the CMS was established under the name Court of Master Sommeliers Americas, and also conducts exams and workshops in Canada.

=== 2018 cheating scandal ===
In October 2018, the Court of Master Sommeliers Americas (CMSA) invalidated the results of the tasting portion of the exam given a month earlier and rescinded the MS title from 23 of the 24 who had been awarded it, a record number of successful candidates, including the first one in six years to win the Krug Cup, given to Master Sommeliers who pass the entire exam on their first attempt, five weeks after the exam after Reggie Narito, a board member of the Court and proctor for the exam, gave at least one candidate information about the wines to be tasted and identified.

The CMSA board revoked Narito's title and expelled him from the organization, although it has never confirmed doing so. All those thus affected would be able to retake the exam the following year at no charge, with the exception of the two other email recipients, who would have to wait another five years.

The affected candidates challenged the board's decision, pointing to a hasty and secretive investigation, but were unable to persuade the board to reverse it. Several of them passed the tasting portion again in the next year, before the COVID-19 pandemic suspended the exams; others gave up, including one the Court sued unsuccessfully over his continued use of the title.

=== Pervasive sexual harassment controversy ===
In October 2020, The New York Times revealed a pattern of sexual harassment among members of the Court of Master Sommeliers, Americas. In response, the body made a statement in support of those who spoke up, though it omitted mention of increased transparency or investigations. Public feedback to the response was negative. In November, the court issued an apology to the women named in the article in the Times. Six master sommeliers lost their titles following investigations into sexual misconduct allegations: Fred Dame, a co-founder of the group who has been called "the godfather of the American sommelier community;” Robert Bath, a professor at St. Helena's Culinary Institute of America; Matt Stamp, co-owner of Napa restaurant Compline; Fred Dexheimer, a wine consultant in Brooklyn; Drew Hendricks, director of business development at Pioneer Wine Co. in Texas; and Joseph Linder, a sommelier in Seattle. Geoff Kruth, founder of GuildSomm, had allegedly made unwanted sexual advances toward at least six female master sommelier candidates, and voluntarily resigned. The organization then held new elections for its board and replaced Chairman Devon Broglie with Emily Wines.

Well-known master sommeliers including Richard Betts, Brian McClintic, Nate Ready, Alpana Singh, Pascaline Lepeltier and Laura Maniec Fiorvanti relinquished their titles, no longer wishing to associate themselves with Court of Master Sommeliers, Americas.

== Education and certification ==
The court has four stages of certification that grow in depth and complexity with each stage. Those who achieve a particular stage are awarded a certificate and badge on the same day as the exam.

=== Introductory ===
Open to anyone, this level consists of two days of classes followed by a multiple-choice exam and wine service exam. Candidates must pass both components to score an overall pass. Topics covered include but are not limited to viticulture, winemaking, grape varieties, major wine regions, wine and food pairing, blind tasting, and the basic details of beer, sake, and liquors. Persons passing receive an "Introductory" lapel pin and certificate. Most participants pass the exam.

=== Certified Sommelier ===
This stage was created in 2006 to bridge the gap between the Introductory and Advanced levels. It is only open to those who have passed the Introductory course and examination, and focuses a great deal more on service and more in-depth knowledge of the world of wine. The exam has three parts: theoretical consisting of multiple-choice and short answer questions, a written blind tasting of four wines (two white and two red), and service. The minimum score to pass is 60 percent. The Court of Master Sommeliers America reports that on average 66 percent of applicants pass the Certified Examination.

=== Advanced Sommelier ===
Testing for the Advanced Sommelier certificate requires candidates to have passed the Certified exam and taken the Advanced Sommelier Course. In the United States, the three-day Advanced Course is offered twice per year and requires the candidate to first submit an application and take a timed knowledge survey which is then followed by the exam at a different date. For the European chapter, the course and exam are done in one, five-day sitting. The Court generally recommends 1–2 years of preparation after successfully passing the Certified exam. The Advanced exam is generally offered three times per year but differs in frequency between the American and European chapters. Candidates must be working and living in one region or the other to sit the exam there.

Often referred to as the "Mini Master", there is a heavier emphasis on service and a more intimate knowledge of all wine styles, regions and wine producers themselves. The examination is a written test with multiple-choice and 60 short-answer questions, a blind tasting of 6 wines in 25 minutes, and a 45-minute service test. The minimum pass mark is 60 percent in each section, and all three sections must be passed together.

=== Master Sommelier ===
Those who wish to take the Master Sommelier exam must have passed the Advanced exam, be invited or recommended to sit the exam and have typically worked in the industry for at least 10 years. The exam covers all aspects of the world and industry of wine, beer, spirits, cocktails, and hospitality from a business, service and philosophical approach. The three part, oral exam consists of theory (must be passed before taking the other two parts), blind tasting six wines before a panel, and service; the three sections do not need be attempted at once. Candidates may take the blind tasting and service exam in successive years. Once the first portion is passed, a candidate has a three-year window, starting with the first attempt, to pass all three portions, i.e. a candidate can pass one part each year for about three consecutive years and successfully become a Master Sommelier. If all three parts are not passed in the three-year window the candidate resets to zero and must retake all parts. The minimum score for each of the three sections to pass is 75 percent at the Master Sommelier level. The typical pass rate at the Master Sommelier exam is around 3–8 percent of applicants; in some instances as few as 1 in 70 have succeeded. The Master Sommelier exam is offered twice per year in the US and once per year in the UK. On average candidates sit for the exam two to three times, and some take the test as many as six times. Only 14 people have ever passed the Master level on the first try. Passing on the first attempt and with the highest score, earns the new Master Sommelier the Remi Krug Cup.

In 2020, the American branch of the court removed the single term "master" from its title-ship, instead adopting the full term "master sommelier" to cultivate diversity and address the racist connotations of the term.

== See also ==
- Confrérie des Chevaliers du Tastevin
- Association de la Sommellerie Internationale
- Wine & Spirit Education Trust
- Italian Sommelier Association
