= Fred Dame =

American wine professional

- Born: 1952 or 1953 (age 71–72)

Fred Dame is an American wine professional.

Dame was born in California and attended Washington and Lee University, earning a degree in journalism and communications.

Dame in 1984 became a Master Sommelier, passing the exam in London before the United States had a court. He was the first person to pass all three parts of the Master Sommelier examination on the first attempt, which is called "winning the Krug Cup".

In 1986 he was co-founder of the Court of Master Sommeliers in the United States and was its first president. He has been called "the godfather of the American sommelier community". He appeared in the 2012 documentary about American sommelier candidates, SOMM. In that documentary other Master Sommeliers described him as intimidating.

In 2020, during the Me Too movement, Dame was accused by multiple female Master Sommeliers or former Master Sommelier candidates of sexual harassment and eventually expelled from the organization.
