= Drive (Star Trek: Voyager) =

- Star Trek: Voyager episode
- Episode no.: Season 7 Episode 3
- Directed by: Winrich Kolbe
- Written by: Michael Taylor
- Production code: 249
- Original air date: October 18, 2000

Guest appearances
- Cyia Batten - Irina; Robert Tyler - Joxom; Patrick Kilpatrick - Assan; Brian George - Ambassador O'Zaal; Chris Covics - Assistant

Episode chronology
← Previous "Imperfection"	Next → "Repression"
- Star Trek: Voyager season 7

"Drive" is the 149th episode of Star Trek: Voyager, and the third episode of its seventh season. The Voyager crew participates in a space race, but not all is as it seems to be. Meanwhile, B'Elanna and Tom Paris work on their relationship.

This science fiction television show episode was written by Michael Taylor and directed by Winrich Kolbe.

This episode includes scenes with the fictional spacecraft, the Delta Flyer.

== Plot ==
Tom Paris and Harry Kim are out taking the new Delta Flyer, rebuilt after the destruction of the first, for a spin through an asteroid field when they are challenged to a drag race by a pilot named Irina in another craft. As they race, they detect a gas leak on board her shuttle. They beam her to safety and bring her craft back to Voyager for repairs.

Irina tells them that she's training with her craft for an important race. Interested, Paris and Kim persuade Captain Janeway to let them enter the Delta Flyer into the race. Janeway agrees because the race is a milestone of peace between four warring cultures who have finally come together to end their strife.

B'Elanna Torres is disappointed that Paris will be racing; she had put serious effort into planning some time off for the two to spend together, and in his excitement over the race, Tom forgets about their plans. He apologizes to her and she claims it is no problem but is inwardly depressed. She even begins to have doubts about their relationship. She confides in Neelix, who convinces her to be patient with Tom, since she really does love him. Seven of Nine suggests that B'Elanna take up some of Tom's hobbies and interests so that they might spend more time together. That thought gives B'Elanna an idea.

On the day of the race, Tom is surprised to find that B'Elanna has taken Harry's place as his co-pilot. She promises to do her best to help the Flyer to victory. As the race nears its end something goes wrong in one of the other shuttles. It's Irina's ship. Her co-pilot has been injured in a console explosion when their shield generators overloaded in an act of sabotage. The rest of the race is cancelled for the day and as Harry helps Irina with her shuttle, she invites him to be her new co-pilot.

Seeing romance sparking between Harry and Irina, B'Elanna has more feelings of doubt about Tom's dedication to their relationship. As the race starts up again, she tries to put her pensive feelings aside and concentrate on winning, but she is not able to hide her distress. She and Tom begin to argue and he insists she tell him what is wrong. Frustrated, he stops the Flyer right in the middle of the race and declares they will not move until they resolve their problem.

At the same time, Harry barely avoids being injured when his console explodes. This being the second time the co-pilot controls have been sabotaged, Harry realises that Irina is responsible. She pulls a weapon on him but he gets it away from her and holds her safely at bay. Irina is bent on sabotaging the peace agreement between the four cultures involved in the race, and she has turned her own ship into a terrorist bomb. To make things worse, she has planted a bomb on board the Delta Flyer as well. Still holding her at phaser-point, Harry sends Tom a message to inform him of the danger.

Tom and B'Elanna receive the message just as he makes his devotion to her a bit clearer by proposing marriage. They speed the Flyer into a nearby nebula and eject the sabotaged warp core where it explodes a safe distance from the racers and spectators. The Flyer is badly damaged but intact, and Tom asks B'Elanna for her answer. Irina is taken into custody.

Voyager's crew are invited to the post-race celebrations, allowing the newlywed Tom and B'Elanna to leave in the Delta Flyer for their honeymoon.

== Continuity ==
Keith R.A. DeCandido writing for Reactor in 2021 noted the following items for continuity:

- The Delta Flyer was rebuilt following its destruction in "Unimatrix Zero."
- Torres mentions that Paris was expelled from Starfleet Academy, but he was not; Paris graduated and served in Starfleet as a junior officer before being involved in an event that resulted in the death of others. The actor Robert Duncan McNeill previously portrayed Nicholas Locarno in The Next Generation episode "The First Duty" in which Locarno was expelled after accepting responsibility for the death of a fellow cadet.
- Paris' and Torres' marriage would be the fifth of Star Trek regular characters to-date, following the O’Brien-Ishikawa wedding in The Next Generation's "Data’s Day," Lwaxana-Odo in Deep Space Nine's "The Muse," Dax-Worf in "You Are Cordially Invited," and Sisko-Yates in "'‘Til Death Do Us Part." The next one would be Riker-Troi in Star Trek: Nemesis.
- Three Deep Space Nine guest stars appear in this episode: Brian George who played Richard Bashir in "Doctor Bashir, I Presume?"; Patrick Kilpatrick who played Reese in "The Siege of AR-558," and Razik in "Initiations"; and Cyia Batten who played Tora Ziyal in "Indiscretion" and "Return to Grace". Batten would next appear in the Star Trek: Enterprise episode "Bound" as Navaar.
- This episode was actually filmed before "Imperfection" but aired after; this is evident as Tom can be seen wearing his wedding ring in the previous episode.

== Reception ==
Digital Spy noted that this episode focuses on the relationship between Tom and B'Elanna, and also involves a race in space. Comic Book Resources ranked Tom and B'Elanna the sixth best romantic relationship of the Star Trek franchise. SyFy said this a was Tom Paris-centric episode, and praised it for exploring the rockier side of relationships as it delves into the Tom-B'Elanna romance.

Keith R.A. DeCandido writing for Reactor said that the episode is "fine" because the idea of sports instead of war "is a good one" and a perfect role for Voyager was as a "neutral party (and provider of medical help)," noting it is what Voyager should've been doing more often (e.g., at the station near the Nekrit Expanse in "Fair Trade", and the Markonian Outpost in "Survival Instinct"). However, he was critical of several other things, including Torres' line, "I kind of like the sound of Tom Torres" stating that in the "24th century" it was "absurd" to even be arguing whether the woman would take the last name of the man since even now in the real-world, the tradition "has been increasingly less common for the past fifty years or so." He summed up by saying that it was "a good premise...decently executed."

== Home media releases ==
On December 21, 2003, this episode was released on DVD as part of a Season 7 boxset; Star Trek Voyager: Complete Seventh Season.
