= One (Star Trek: Voyager) =

- Star Trek: Voyager episode
- Episode no.: Season 4 Episode 25
- Directed by: Kenneth Biller
- Written by: Jeri Taylor
- Production code: 193
- Original air date: May 13, 1998

Guest appearances
- Ron Ostrow - Borg Drone; Wade Williams - Trajis Lo-Tarik

Episode chronology
← Previous "Demon"	Next → "Hope and Fear"
- Star Trek: Voyager season 4

"One" is the 93rd episode of Star Trek: Voyager, the 25th and penultimate episode of the fourth season. It originally aired on May 13, 1998.

Set in the 24th century, the series follows the adventures of the crew of the starship Voyager, stranded on the opposite side of the galaxy from Earth and facing a decades-long journey home. This episode focuses on the character Seven of Nine, a former member of the cybernetic hive mind known as the Borg, as she faces isolation and loneliness for the first time since being freed from the Borg collective consciousness.

The episode was based on a premise by James Swallow, based on an invitation to pitch after he submitted a spec script.

== Plot ==
As Voyager enters a nebula, the crew begins to suffer from intense pain, and one crewmember dies from burns on his skin; only Seven of Nine is unaffected. Realizing that they cannot withstand the radiation emanating from the nebula for the month it would take to cross, the Doctor proposes placing the crew, save for himself (a holographic artificial intelligence) and Seven, in stasis, allowing them to cross the nebula safely. Captain Janeway agrees, and soon, the crew is safely stowed into stasis chambers.

Seven adopts a daily cycle to assure the ship maintains its course and the crew remains healthy while in stasis, at times dealing with Tom Paris's fear of small spaces and placing him back in stasis with the Doctor's help. The Doctor attempts to engage Seven in human activities such as a simulated party on the holodeck, but Seven continues to try to keep working during these times. The ship's computer begins malfunctioning as it is affected by the nebula's radiation, generating a false-alarm report of an anti-matter storage failure. The Doctor discovers his mobile holographic emitter has started to fail as well, and is forced to stay in sickbay until the journey is complete.

As the ship nears the edge of the nebula, Seven begins feeling the effects of prolonged isolation, experiencing disturbing dreams. Another ship appears, helmed by Trajis Lo-Tarik, looking to trade for supplies. After Seven brings him aboard, he disappears into the ship and seems intent on destroying Voyager. Seven continues to suffer intense hallucinations, including Harry Kim and Tom Paris bursting into flames. The Doctor temporarily repairs his mobile emitter to try to help Seven, assuring her there is no one else on board—Trajis himself was a hallucination—before his emitter dies out.

As the hallucinations worsen for Seven, visions of the Borg tell her she cannot survive on her own. When the ship's engines begin to fail, she briefly cuts power to the stasis chambers to maintain propulsion, but thinks better of it and opts to route power from life support instead. Soon, she passes out.

Seven regains consciousness in sickbay, where the crew congratulate her on successfully getting the ship out of the nebula. Later, Seven observes Paris, Kim, and Torres at the mess hall. She asks to join them, feeling the need for companionship after her ordeal, and they invite her to sit down.

== Reception ==
"One" was rated the most overlooked of the best episodes of Star Trek: Voyager on Netflix by Wired in 2017. In particular they praised the performance of actress Jeri Ryan as the Ex-Borg Seven of Nine, and noted it as a study of the impact of isolation.

In 2017, Den of Geek included this episode, along with "Scorpion" (Part II), "Year Of Hell" (2-parts), "Message In A Bottle", "Living Witness", and "Hope And Fear" from Season 4, for their abbreviated viewing guide for Star Trek: Voyager.

In 2022, SyFy Wire included "One" as one of the 12 (Note: The SyFy Wire article treats the two-part / two-season episodes of "Scorpion" as one episode, doing the same for the similarly structured "Unimatrix Zero", when counting the number of episodes included in its list of 12.) "essential" Seven of Nine episodes in the franchise.
