= Think Tank (Star Trek: Voyager) =

- Star Trek: Voyager episode
- Episode no.: Season 5 Episode 20
- Directed by: Terrence O'Hara
- Story by: Rick Berman; Brannon Braga
- Teleplay by: Michael Taylor
- Production code: 214
- Original air date: March 31, 1999

Guest appearances
- Jason Alexander - Kurros; Christopher Darga - Y'Sek; Christopher Shea - Saowin; Steven Dennis - Fennim (uncredited); Tarik Ergin - Lt. Ayala and Hazari crewman (uncredited)

Episode chronology
← Previous "The Fight"	Next → "Juggernaut"
- Star Trek: Voyager season 5

"Think Tank" is the 114th episode of the science fiction television series Star Trek: Voyager, the 20th episode of the fifth season. Jason Alexander, made famous in the 1990s from the hit sitcom Seinfeld, which had recently ended its run, guest stars as Kurros. In this episode, Voyager encounters a unique group of aliens, who offer to help solve problems, but for a price.

This episode first aired on UPN on March 31, 1999.

== Plot ==
Voyager is sought after by the Hazari, unyielding bounty hunters of the Delta Quadrant, within a sector of space. Every escape route devised by the crew leads to dangerous battles with the Hazari. At their wit's end, they are suddenly visited by Kurros (Jason Alexander), the speaker for a small group of highly intelligent aliens that Captain Kathryn Janeway dubs the "Think Tank". Their vessel, safely hidden from the Hazari in sub-space, includes a telepathic module that allows Kurros and his group to quickly communicate and to solve complex problems. As Janeway and Seven of Nine are brought aboard, and Seven given a brief opportunity to experience their telepathic communication, the Think Tank offers their services to Voyager - a means of escaping the Hazari in exchange for a selection of Voyager's technology and "unique" items. Janeway seems pleased with the solution, until she is informed by Kurros that they would also like Seven as part of their payment. Both Janeway and Seven refuse this payment, but Kurros keeps the offer on the table and offers a free bit of advice for dealing with the Hazari as a good-faith sign of their cooperation.

Voyager is able to capture a sole Hazari ship, beaming its crew aboard. In their records, they find out who placed the bounty on Voyager; seemingly, it was the Malon. The crew recognizes oddities in the information as stored on the computer, as well as the atypical motivation of the Malon, and investigate further. They discover that it was really Kurros who hired the Hazari. The Think Tank has been playing both sides of the conflict to force Janeway into handing over Seven and to get what they want. Explaining the situation to the Hazari, the combined crews begin to work out a way to outsmart the Think Tank.

Janeway and the Hazari orchestrate a scenario in which Voyager appears to be falling under the Hazari attack, and Seven leaves in a shuttle, supposedly giving in to the Think Tank's demands. The shuttle disappears into sub-space with the Think Tank's ship. Aboard, Kurros welcomes Seven, but is suspicious of their capitulation and links her to the telepathic matrix to probe her mind. The waiting Voyager crew sees this and send a signal through Seven's cybernetic implants, causing the telepathic matrix to shut down, incapacitating the Think Tank. Their ship falls out of sub-space and soon is attacked from all sides by the Hazari, now seeking revenge on them. Voyager rescues Seven and leaves the Think Tank to potentially be destroyed at the hands of the Hazari.

== Reception ==
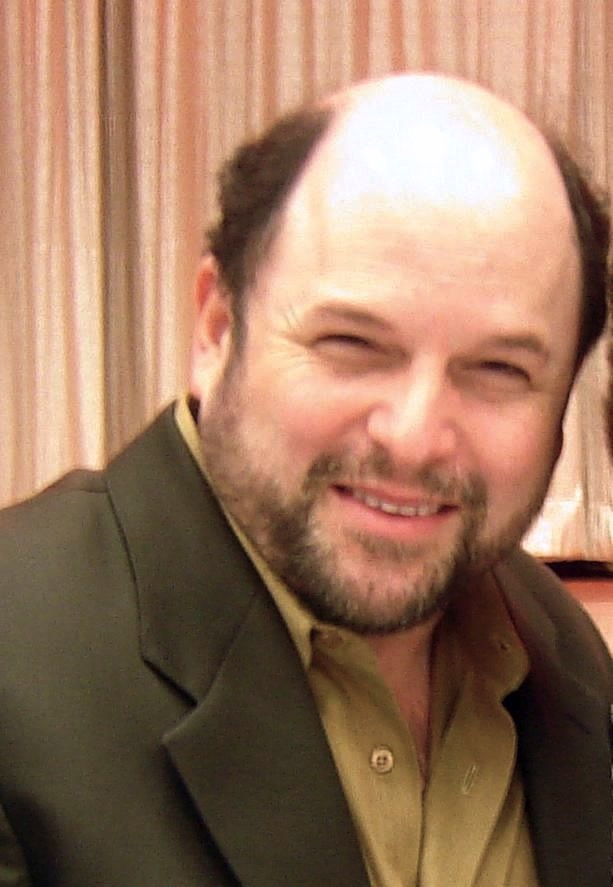
Actor Jason Alexander guest stars in this episode, noted for having starred on Seinfeld

"Think Tank" is noted for Jason Alexander in his guest-star role, and the actor has said he is a fan of the Star Trek franchise in interviews. TV Guide and Variety have noted Jason Alexander's role in this episode as one of the surprising guest stars of the Star Trek franchise. They note he was famous for playing George Costanza on the hit TV show Seinfeld, but was able to bring a new presence to his presentation of the Star Trek alien Kurros in this episode. Cinefantastique noted the cast said it was "a real honor" to have Jason Alexander guest star on Star Trek: Voyager.

== Releases ==
"Think Tank" was released on LaserDisc in Japan on June 22, 2001, as part of 5th Season vol.2, which included episodes from "Dark Frontier" to "Equinox, Part I". The episode had two audio tracks, English and Japanese. This set had 6 double sided 12" optical discs giving a total runtime of 552 minutes.

It was also released on VHS paired with "The Disease".

On November 9, 2004, "Think Tank" was released as part of the season 5 DVD box set of Star Trek: Voyager.
