= Someone to Watch Over Me (Star Trek: Voyager) =

- Star Trek: Voyager episode
- Episode no.: Season 5 Episode 22
- Directed by: Robert Duncan McNeill
- Story by: Brannon Braga
- Teleplay by: Michael Taylor
- Production code: 216
- Original air date: April 28, 1999

Guest appearances
- Scott Thompson - Tomin; Ian Abercrombie - Abbot; David Burke - Steven Price; Brian McNamara - William Chapman

Episode chronology
← Previous "Juggernaut"	Next → "11:59"
- Star Trek: Voyager season 5

"Someone to Watch Over Me" is the 116th episode of the science fiction television series Star Trek: Voyager, the 22nd episode of the fifth season. It was directed by cast member Robert Duncan McNeil.

In this episode, the ship's holographic Doctor makes a bet with Ensign Tom Paris that he can teach ex-Borg Seven of Nine about romance. The episode has many similarities to the George Bernard Shaw 's 1913 play Pygmalion, which inspired both the 1964 musical My Fair Lady and the 1999 film She's All That.

== Plot ==
Captain Kathryn Janeway and Tuvok leave the ship as official guests of a nearby colony; Neelix is assigned the task of escorting the colony's guest, Tomin, aboard the ship. Neelix is surprised that Tomin is quick to break the strict regime set by his people to sample everything from food to entertainment that Voyager has to offer.

Meanwhile, Tom Paris and B'Elanna Torres become upset after discovering Seven of Nine observing and documenting their romantic interactions. The Doctor offers to help teach Seven on human courting rituals through an elaborate educational course, including such elements as singing. Seven works her way up from interactions with holodeck men and eventually ends up on a date with another human crewman. When they attempt to dance, Seven's strength strains the crewman's arms, prematurely ending the date. Seven comes to believe that she is unsuitable for dating. The Doctor has become somewhat smitten with her, and on a bet with Paris, offers to take her to Tomin's reception. Seven's behavior is perfectly appropriate for the event but upon learning of The Doctor's bet, she storms off.

The crew finds that Tomin's physiology is unable to handle the synthahol used in drinks and becomes highly intoxicated on the night prior to the return of his elder, on the night a shipwide reception is due to take place for him. Neelix works with The Doctor and Seven to use Seven's Borg nano-probes to process the synthahol. Tomin, though still unsteady on his feet, is collected enough to greet his elder, Janeway, and Tuvok with Neelix's help in the same regiment in which he initially arrived. To their surprise, the elder thought that Tomin would have taken time to sample what Voyager had, in moderation. Neelix is commended for his duties.

The Doctor, alone, practices wooing Seven in the holodeck. He is interrupted by the real Seven. She presents the Doctor with an enhanced tricorder as a gift for his help, but admits that she believes there is no suitable mate on board and says she may seek his "guidance" in the future. The Doctor is unable to express his feelings and only tells Seven that the last few days have been "unforgettable". After she leaves, the Doctor begins to play George Gershwin's "Someone to Watch Over Me" on piano in one of the holodeck simulations of Sandrine's Bar.

== Production ==
The episode was directed by Robert Duncan McNeill, who plays Tom Paris.

== Reception ==
Tor.com rated the episode 5 out of 10.Jammer's Reviews gave it 3.5 out of 4 stars and called it "A delightfully pleasant, hilarious, and sincere hour."

In 2011, Tor.com included this as one of six episodes of Star Trek: Voyager that are worth re-watching. The episode was ranked as one of the top 10 episodes of Star Trek: Voyager in 2018.

In 2016, The Hollywood Reporter rated "Someone to Watch Over Me" in the top 100 of all Star Trek episodes.

In 2016, Vox rated this one of the top 25 essential episodes of all Star Trek.

In 2022, SyFy Wire included "Someone to Watch Over Me" as one of the 12 (Note: The SyFy Wire article treats the two-part / two-season episodes of "Scorpion" as one episode, doing the same for the similarly structured "Unimatrix Zero", when counting the number of episodes included in its list of 12.) "essential" Seven of Nine episodes in the franchise.

== Releases ==
This episode was released on LaserDisc in Japan on June 22, 2001, as part of 5th Season vol.2, which included episodes from "Dark Frontier" to "Equinox, Part I". The episode had two audio tracks, English and Japanese. This set had 6 double sided 12" optical discs giving a total runtime of 552 minutes.

"Someone to Watch Over Me" and "Juggernaut" were released together on one VHS tape.

On November 9, 2004,this episode was released as part of the season 5 DVD box set of Star Trek: Voyager. The box set includes 7 DVD optical discs with all the episodes in season 5 with some extra features, and episodes have a Dolby Digital 5.1 surround sound audio track.
