= Repression =

Repression may refer to:

- Memory inhibition, the ability to filter irrelevant memories from attempts to recall
- Political repression, the oppression or persecution of an individual or group for political reasons
- Psychological repression, the psychological act of excluding desires and impulses from one's consciousness
- Social repression, the socially supported mistreatment and exploitation of a group of individuals
- Transnational repression, the political repression conducted by a state outside its borders
- Genetic repression, the down-regulation of gene transcription by the action of repressor proteins binding to a promoter
- "Repression" (Star Trek: Voyager), an episode of the science fiction television series Star Trek: Voyager, the fourth episode of the seventh (and final) season of the series
