= Course: Oblivion =

- Star Trek: Voyager episode
- Episode no.: Season 5 Episode 18
- Directed by: Anson Williams
- Story by: Bryan Fuller
- Teleplay by: Bryan Fuller; Nick Sagan
- Production code: 213
- Original air date: March 3, 1999

Guest appearance
- Majel Barrett as Voyager Computer (voice)

Episode chronology
← Previous "The Disease"	Next → "The Fight"
- Star Trek: Voyager season 5

"Course: Oblivion" is the 112th episode of the science fiction television series Star Trek: Voyager, the 18th episode of the fifth season. It is a sequel to the fourth-season episode "Demon".

In this episode a spaceship is making its way back to Earth, after being flung to the other side of the Galaxy. However, on the journey the crew begin to experience medical and technical problems.

The episode was written by Bryan Fuller and Nick Sagan, and directed by Anson Williams. It aired on UPN on March 3, 1999.

== Plot ==
The Voyager crew celebrates the wedding of Lt. Torres to Lt. Paris, as well as the successful use of their enhanced warp drive that will cut the remaining time to the Alpha Quadrant down to two years. Their celebration is short-lived, as systems across the ship start to fail, and Torres contracts a crippling disease that breaks down her cellular structure, eventually killing her. Between the Doctor's findings and readings taken from the various systems, the crew quickly discovers that they and the ship are duplicates of the real Voyager crew, created when the ship landed on a Class Y "demon planet" within the last year ("Demon"). The biomimetic compound that makes up the crew and the ship has become unstable within the enhanced warp field.

As more crewmembers and ship systems fail, Captain Kathryn Janeway orders the crew to look for another Class Y planet, hoping that exposure to its atmosphere will stabilize the biomimetic compound. They come across one after some searching, but it is protected by a mining ship; though Voyager could destroy the mining ship, Janeway orders Voyager to retreat, putting Starfleet values above their own preservation. With no other choice, Janeway orders the ship to turn around, and engage the enhanced warp drive, hoping to reach the previous Class Y planet before their ship collapses. En route, Janeway suggests the construction of a time capsule of materials not made of the biomimetic material, storing their personal and mission logs in case they do not make it.

Some time later, with only a skeleton crew remaining and much of the ship uninhabitable, the remaining crew realize they will no longer be able to make it to the planet. Attempts to launch the time capsule fail. The failing sensors detect a ship just in communications range, but their communication array is all but non-functional. Harry Kim, now acting as captain, orders the warp core ejected to bring the ship out of warp and allow them time to contact the ship for help, knowing this may tear the ship apart.

The real Voyager receives a distress call and heads towards the coordinates, but finds only remnants of the biomimetic liquid drifting in space. Janeway makes a note of their rescue attempt, and orders the ship to continue on course to home.

== Reception ==
In 2016, John Andrews writing for Den of Geek, said this was the 2nd best episode that Bryan Fuller wrote, noting it "packs a punch" and has a poignant ending.

In 2017, ScreenRant ranked this episode the 6th thematically darkest episode of the Star Trek franchise.

In 2020, Den of Geek ranked this episode the 27th most scary episode of all Star Trek series up to that time.

== Releases ==
"Course: Oblivion" was released on LaserDisc in Japan on June 22, 2001, as part of 5th Season vol.2, which included episodes from "Dark Frontier" to "Equinox, Part I". The episode had two audio tracks, English and Japanese. This set had 6 double sided 12" optical discs giving a total runtime of 552 minutes.

It was also released on VHS paired with "The Disease".

On November 9, 2004, this episode was released as part of the season 5 DVD box set of Star Trek: Voyager. The box set includes 7 DVD optical discs with all the episodes in season 5 with some extra features, and episodes have a Dolby Digital 5.1 surround sound audio track.
