= Hope and Fear =

- Star Trek: Voyager episode
- The bridge of the Dauntless
- Episode no.: Season 4 Episode 26
- Directed by: Winrich Kolbe
- Story by: Rick Berman; Brannon Braga; Joe Menosky
- Teleplay by: Brannon Braga; Joe Menosky
- Cinematography by: Marvin V. Rush
- Production code: 194
- Original air date: May 20, 1998

Guest appearances
- Ray Wise – Arturis; Jack Shearer – Admiral Hayes

Episode chronology
← Previous "One"	Next → "Night"
- Star Trek: Voyager season 4

"Hope and Fear" is the 26th and final episode of the fourth season of the American science fiction television series Star Trek: Voyager. The episode first aired on the UPN network on May 20, 1998. Directed by Winrich Kolbe, it was developed from a story by Rick Berman, Brannon Braga and Joe Menosky into a teleplay by Menosky and Braga. "Hope and Fear" was the final episode of the Star Trek franchise to be worked on by executive producer Jeri Taylor.

Set in the 24th century, the series follows the adventures of the Starfleet and Maquis crew of the starship USS Voyager after they were stranded in the Delta Quadrant far from the rest of the Federation. In this episode, the Voyager crew discover a ship sent from Starfleet that could take them back to the Alpha Quadrant in just 3 months, but it will mean abandoning their vessel. However, it is all revealed to be an elaborate trap as the alien Arturis (Ray Wise) attempts to gain his revenge on the crew for preventing the destruction of the Borg.

A variety of ideas were proposed for the season finale, with focus given to those plots relating to "slipstream" technology. The alien, named Arturis, was referred to as Yoda prior to being properly named. The sets for the fake Starfleet vessel, the USS Dauntless, were created by production designer Richard James. He sought to enable a quick change from the Starfleet appearance into something more alien. Rick Sternbach created the exterior of the vessel. Wise was cast as Arturis without auditioning, and the character's makeup was re-purposed by Michael Westmore from a design created for another television series. The episode was shot between February 28 and March 11. The final cut of "Hope and Fear" with special effects was delivered by April 30, with the score by Dennis McCarthy recorded on May 5. The episode received Nielsen ratings of 4.1/7 percent. One critic complained of continuance of the status quo in the series. However, it was warmly received by others and has been featured in best of lists, both of the season and of the series.

== Plot ==
Captain Kathryn Janeway (Kate Mulgrew) continues to struggle in deciphering an encrypted Starfleet message that they previously obtained through the Hirogen relay system ("Hunters"). Neelix (Ethan Phillips) returns to Voyager with a guest, Arturis (Ray Wise), who helped him obtain supplies. Arturis learns of the encoded message and helps decrypt it. The message is from Starfleet Command, with a nearby set of coordinates where their means of getting back home can be found. Though the rest of the crew is elated at this news, Seven of Nine (Jeri Ryan) remains cautious, given that the Borg have never been able to assimilate Arturis' species. Voyager arrives at the provided coordinates to find an unmanned Starfleet vessel, the Dauntless, of unknown design. Aboard, they find the ship uses quantum slipstream technology, which will allow them to reach the Alpha Quadrant within a few months.

Janeway begins to share Seven's suspicions and warns the crew to stay alert, but remains optimistic. The new engine system is compatible with Voyager, but the ship cannot stand the stresses of the slipstream for long. The crew would have to abandon the ship to use the Dauntless to travel home. Janeway reviews the decoded message and discovers it to be fake. She transports to the Dauntless to confront Arturis. He activates a panel on the ship, igniting the engines. All but Janeway and Seven are transported out before the ship enters the slipstream.

Commander Chakotay (Robert Beltran) orders Voyager to pursue the Dauntless into the slipstream, aware that the system has not been fully tested yet. The Dauntless is revealed to be Arturis' own ship, masked as a Starfleet vessel. He explains that his homeworld was recently assimilated by the Borg, an event that might not have happened if the Borg were still at war with Species 8472. He directly blames Janeway and her crew for interfering in that war ("Scorpion") and vows to bring Voyager's crew to the Borg for assimilation. Suddenly Voyager appears and targets the shields on Arturis' ship, allowing them to transport Janeway and Seven off the ship. Voyager breaks off pursuit and alters slipstream trajectory away from Borg space, while Arturis finds himself deep among an array of Borg cubes and quietly accepts his fate. Though the slipstream technology is deemed unusable for the immediate future, Voyager's brief use of it has shaved 300 light years off their journey home.

== Production ==
=== Writing ===
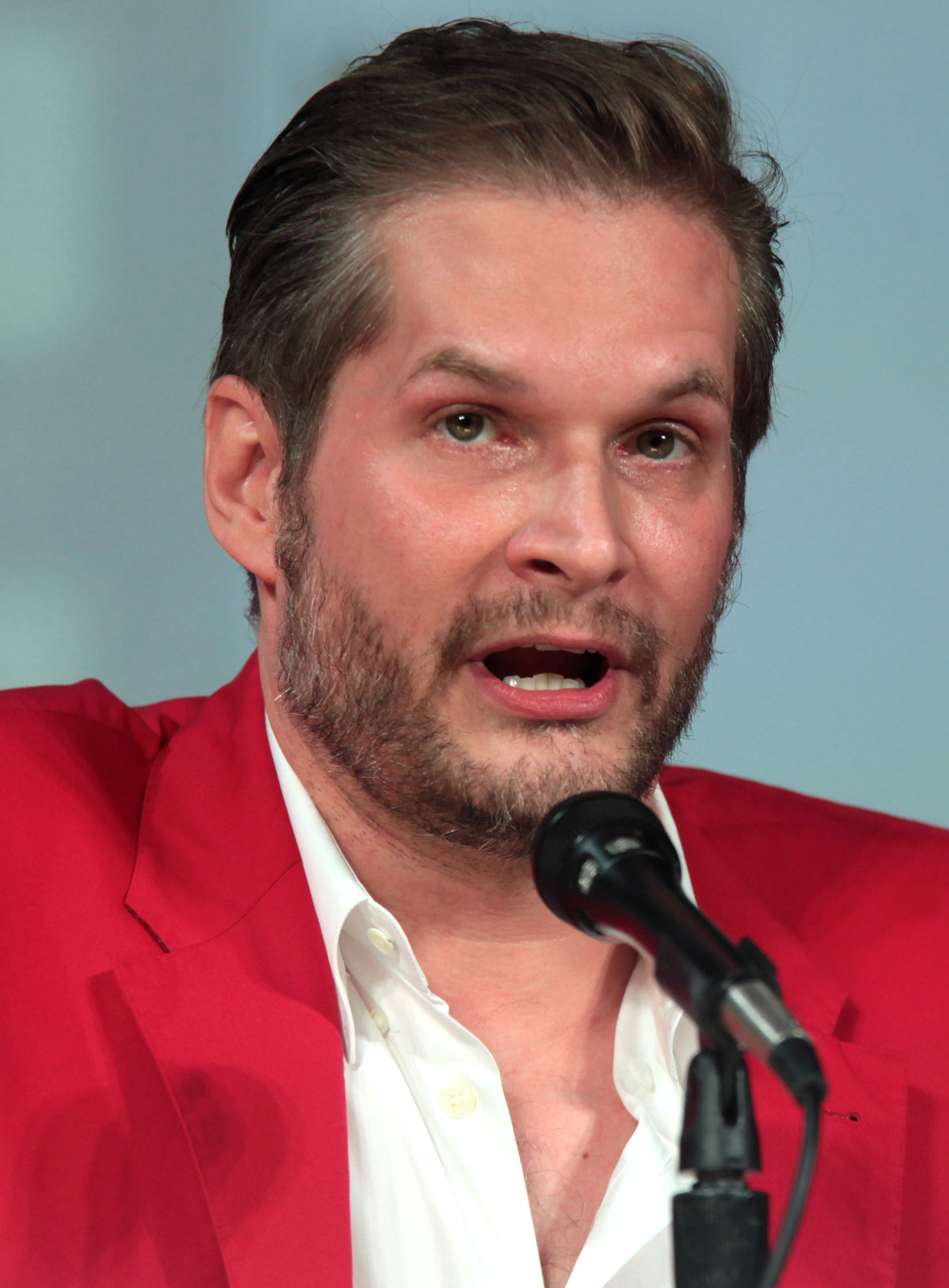
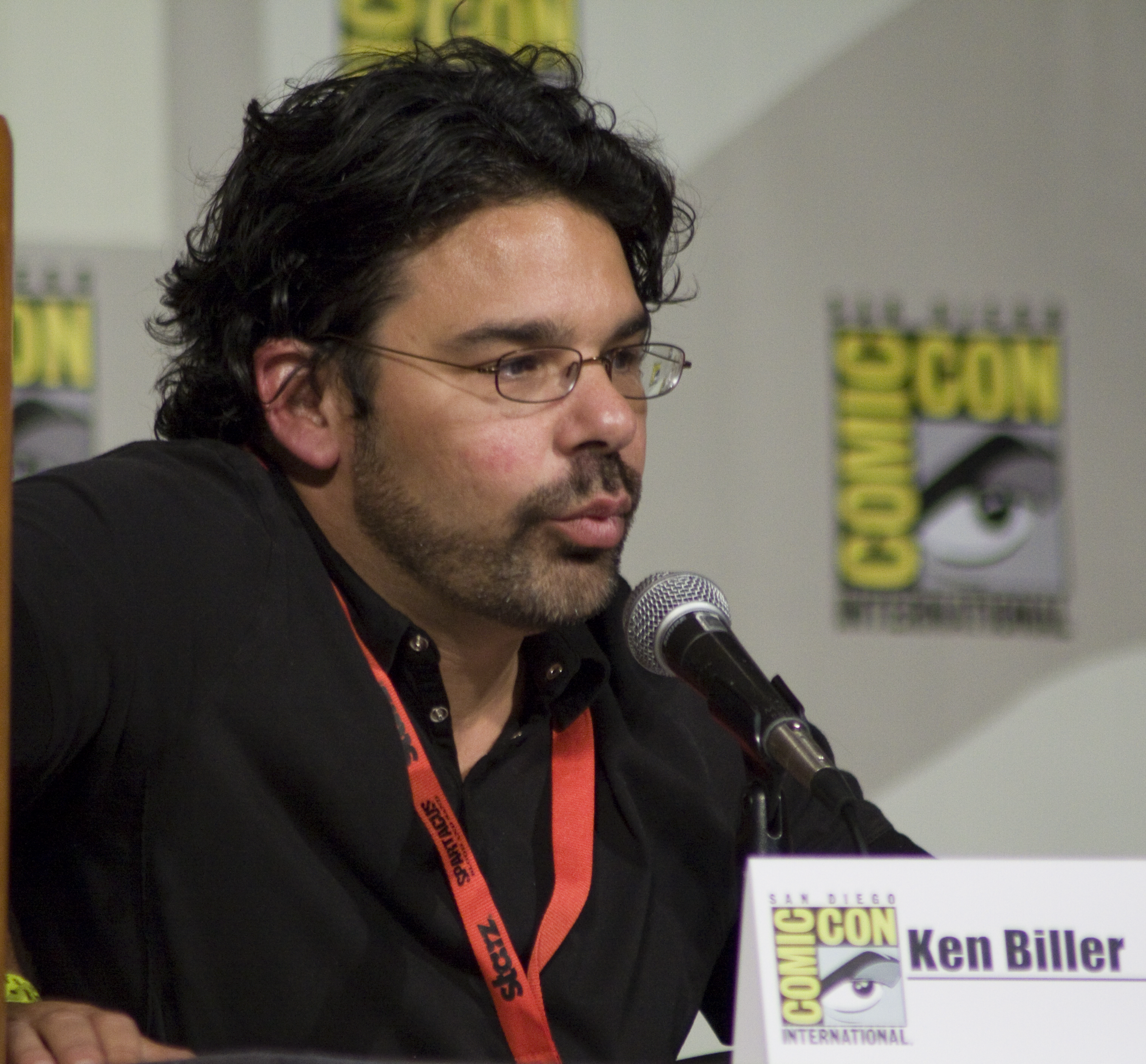
Bryan Fuller and Kenneth Biller (pictured left to right) were two of the writers working on the Voyager fourth-season finale.

The episode was the final work on Star Trek by executive producer Jeri Taylor. Pre-production began 24 days prior to shooting, with a morning meeting attended by Taylor, Brannon Braga, Joe Menosky, Kenneth Biller, Lisa Klink and Bryan Fuller. The initial idea presented was one which had been considered as the cliffhanger for the third season; this involved duplicates of the Voyager crew. The general premise would go on to be used in the episode "Demon" instead. In this pitch, the duplicates managed to return to the Alpha Quadrant to Deep Space Nine but it turns out to be an invasion.

The duplicates idea was shelved once more as the producers felt it would undermine the impact when the real Voyager returned home. A second idea was proposed based on the Starfleet communication the ship received in "Hunters". It would have seen Janeway work out a means to decode the transmission herself, which revealed it to be plans for a "slipstream" drive. Seven was to be wary as the technology had resulted in the destruction of Borg vessels. The pitch would have seen modifications made to Voyager, which enters a slipstream and finds itself on an "intergalactic freeway" with other vessels travelling so fast as to make the ship look like a horse and buggy in comparison.

Several other ideas were then proposed. One involved Seven's Borg implants suffering severe side effects from being in the slipstream, but this was discarded as it felt similar to the episode "One", which was due to air immediately prior to the finale. An alternative involved a battle in the slipstream with an alien vessel, which results in that crew abandoning it and Seven suggesting that they use the new ship to take the crew all the way home. Janeway disagrees, but somehow Seven ends up in command of the alien vessel and for some sort of dangerous situation to occur which Janeway must save her from. It was proposed that there was some reason why they attacked Voyager, and Taylor suggested "vengeance", which was well received by the others.

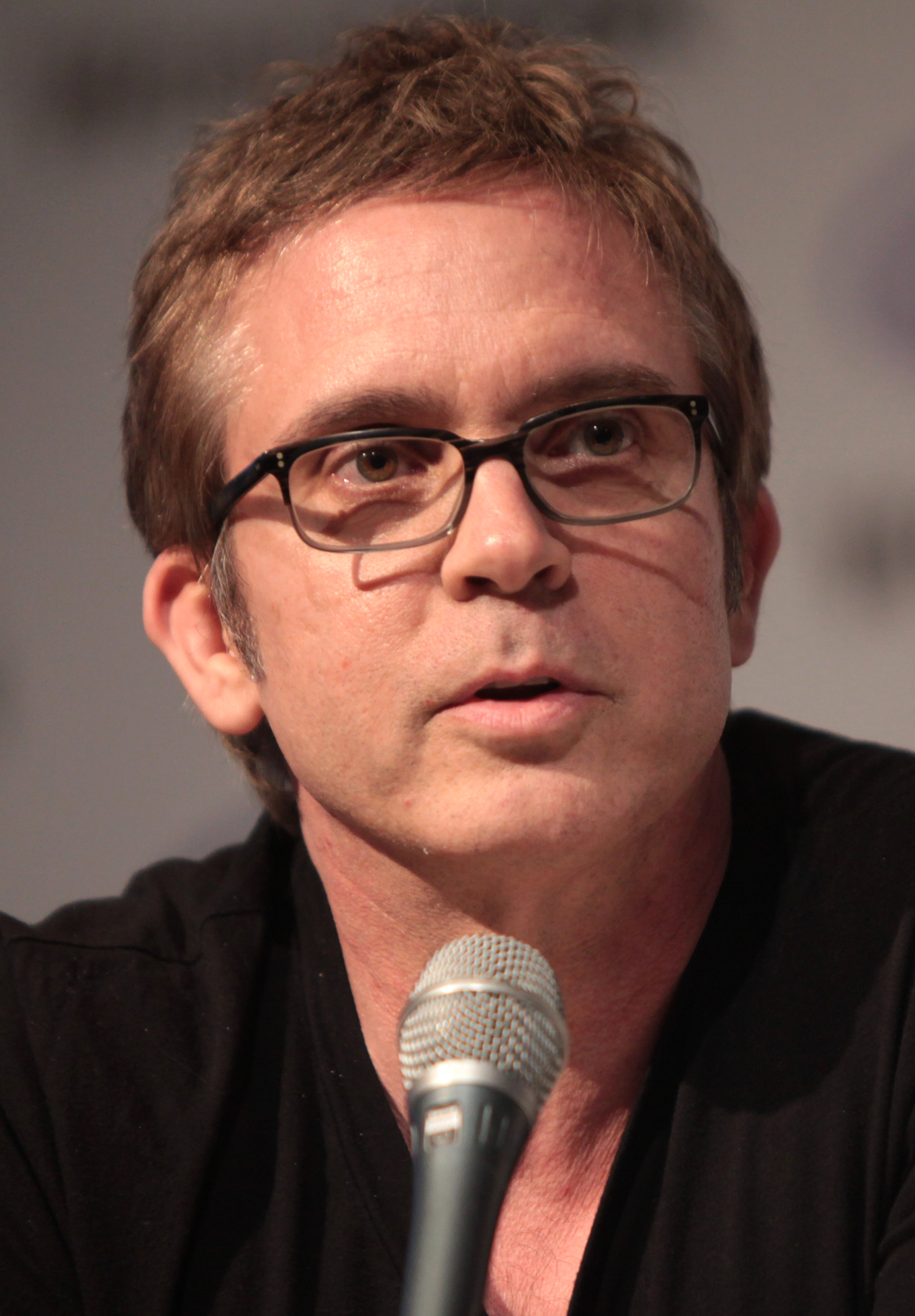
Brannon Braga wrote the initial beat-sheet for "Hope and Fear", crediting Rick Berman and Joe Menosky.

The writing team reconvened later that day, after Braga met with executive producer Rick Berman separately. Berman made several suggestions for the plot: that Janeway shouldn't decode the message immediately at the start of the episode, and that the vengeance-seeking alien should be decrepit and attempting to deceive the crew. As the group planned out an overview of the idea on a whiteboard, the alien was once again discussed. The idea of having him be of a species which had already been assimilated by the Borg was warmly received, with Menosky suggesting that it could be one of the first races assimilated. Braga countered by suggesting three ideas: that it could be an early race, one that was more recent, or that it could be an El-Aurian. Taylor dismissed the El-Aurian suggestion as she wanted the alien to have more interesting makeup. The writers begin to refer to the alien as "Yoda". During the second meeting, the plot of the episode prior to the reveal of the new spacecraft was developed. The "silver bullet" style ship had been suggested by Braga for some time, but until now had not found an appropriate episode.

A smaller team reconvened during the morning of February 3, as Biller was preparing for work on the episode "One" and Menosky was completing the script for "Living Witness". There were concerns about the pace of the episode being slowed by an exploration of the new ship and the budget that such scenes would require. It was suggested that if the episode had a single guest star that this cost could be offset. Menosky and Biller joined the group after lunch, with the duo agreeing that the alien's ruse was going to be a problem, instead suggesting that the episode should be played "straight" with the main drama focused around the Janeway/Seven conflict. Braga took the work on the episode away in order to work on it overnight. He later said that this was the first "wall" the writers had hit all season. In the early hours of February 4, Braga worked out how to fit everything together by having the episode become a retrospection of the entire season and called Menosky during the night to discuss it. The following day, Braga sent a beat-sheet crediting himself, Berman and Menosky as writers to the department heads on the show. This set the episode out in five acts, which appeared similar to those in the final version. February 17 saw the delivery of a 68-page teleplay to production staff. The episode received the title "Hope and Fear", and the alien vessel was named Dauntless. This name had originated from a conversation between Berman and Braga from over a year earlier, and it had been kept by Braga for a future purpose.

=== Set and ship design ===
Set design began on February 9, with production designer Richard James looking at the creation of the new Starfleet vessel specified in Braga's beat-sheet. The description he had to work from was "a sleek, sparkling STARSHIP (which we'll call the "silver bullet") floating in space. Scans reveal – it's a Starfleet vessel!" James took into account the set space available, with the primary position located on Stage 16 at the Paramount lot between the museum set built for "Living Witness" and a set under construction for "One". James decided that the majority of the sets would have to be redresses of the Voyager standing sets to reduce cost, but that new bridge and engineering rooms would need to be built for the Dauntless. The bridge set would be difficult because it needed to look like a Starfleet vessel but would need to "instantaneously change" to an alien bridge as required by the beat-sheet. He wanted to repeat the sleekness of the exterior design by curving the walls of the bridge, something that was too difficult with a wooden set. Instead, he used several steel grids with a muslin cover. He hit upon the idea that these would be backlit in Starfleet colors, and when required they could switch instantly to a different color for the alien design. The new bridge was built in the alien configuration but with additional panels and props created that could affix to the set to lend it a Starfleet appearance.

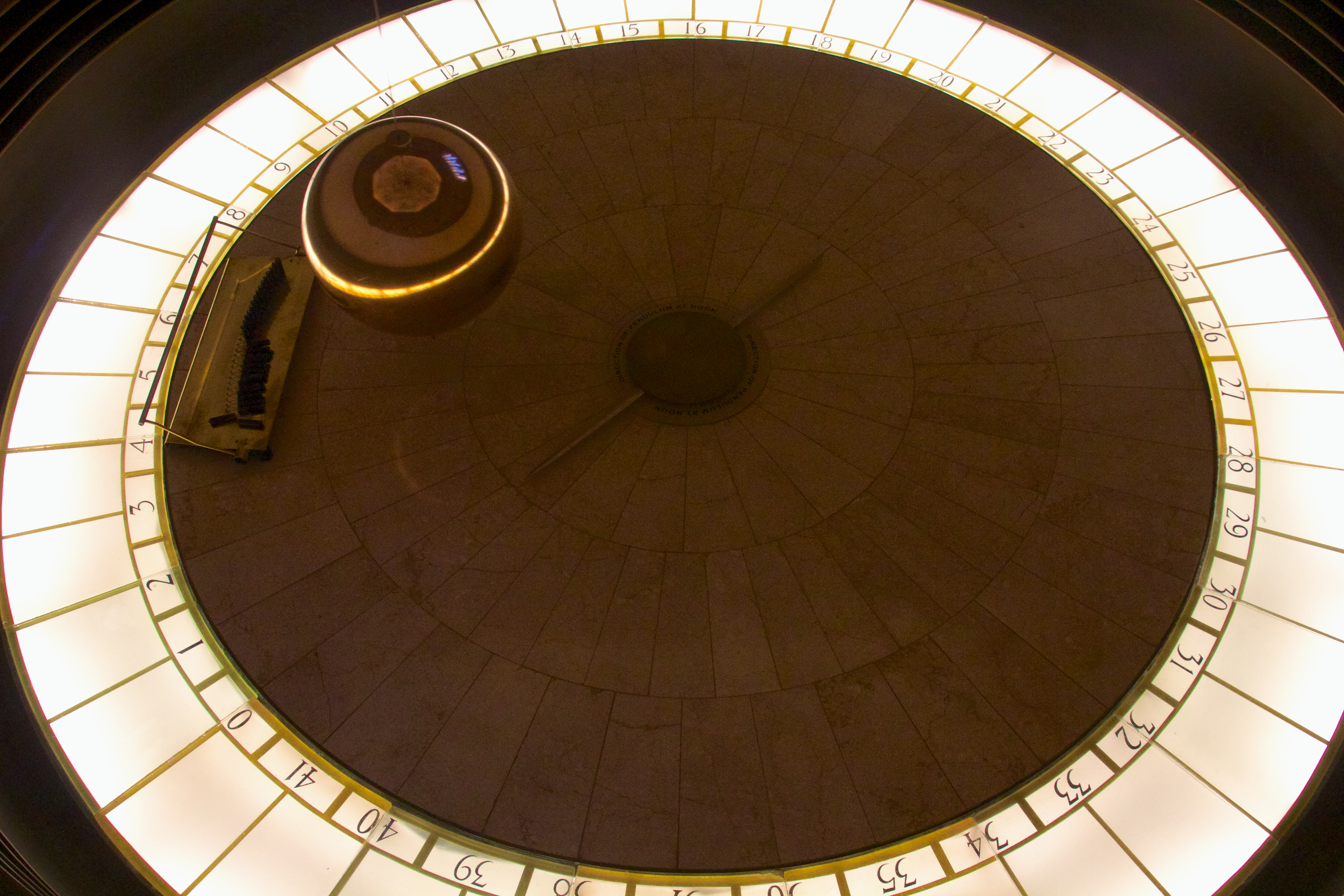
Brannon Braga compared director Winrich Kolbe's idea for the alien engineering set to the Foucault pendulum in the rotunda at Griffith Observatory (pictured).

Director Winrich Kolbe had ideas about the engineering set, suggesting that it should be a dangerous place with the Voyager crew looking down on the engine core. Braga compared the idea to the Foucault pendulum in the rotunda at Griffith Observatory. James' designs were not as elaborate as Kolbe suggested, but together with visual effects supervisor Ronald B. Moore they worked out a means of enabling the director to film from above. They raised the set 20 feet (6.1 m) over a blue screen to enable it to be backlit properly. Kolbe further suggested in a production meeting on February 25 that the change of lighting suggesting by James for the bridge should shift from the Starfleet colors to orange to maximise the alien effect. James produced a foamcore model of the Dauntless bridge, to both illustrate the final construction and to enable Kolbe to plan his camera angles while it was still being built.

The exterior of the Dauntless was developed by illustrator Rick Sternbach, who had previously designed several vessels and props for the Star Trek franchise including the USS Voyager itself. He created a series of diamond-shaped designs for the Dauntless, featuring a protruding bridge. The producers approved one of the designs, but asked him to remove the bridge protrusion to give as sleek an appearance as possible. He created drawings to that specification on March 5, passing them to Moore, who sent those designs to Adam "Mojo" Lebowitz at Foundation Imaging to create a CGI model of the ship. The production team had opted for a computer-generated version of the ship rather than a physical model due to the time constraints and the difficulty that would have caused for the effects shot when the slipstream drive is activated. Sternbach suggested to Moore that the Dauntless hull should have a warmer coppery color rather than the typical Starfleet grey.

A temporary CGI version for the production team was created using LightWave 3D by Lightwave employee Brandon McDougal while the final version was under construction. The visual effects on "Hope and Fear" were extensive for a Voyager episode, which usually averages around 40 such shots. While some had been as low as 12 effects, there were more than 70 for "Hope and Fear". Foundation Imaging delivered the required effects on time, prior to the deadline of April 30, even though they were still working on other episodes until two days prior. One shot that was not requested but was created was the final image of the Dauntless as it arrives in Borg space. The composite footage, using models developed for Star Trek: The Next Generation and the film Star Trek: First Contact, did not appear in the script, but had been added by Koji Kuramura and Emile Smith. It was well received by the production team, and it appears in the final version of the episode.

=== Arturis ===
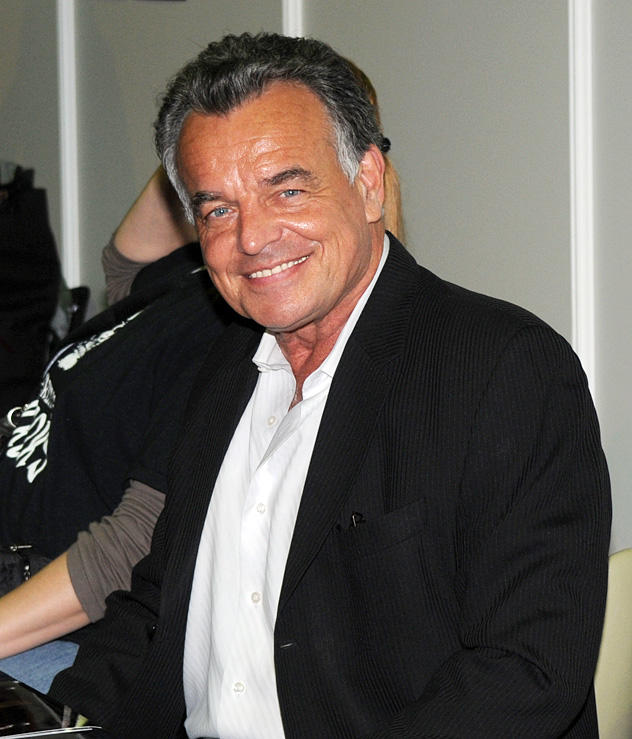
Ray Wise, who portrayed Arturis in "Hope and Fear", was not required to audition for the role.

During the writing process, the "Yoda" character gradually became younger. Taylor later explained that this was not a specific decision but instead something that just occurred naturally. Casting director Ron Surma contacted agents of a few well known actors in the hope that they could get a notable actor to portray the character, now named Arturis. One of those actors who were not required to audition was Ray Wise, as he had previously appeared in the Star Trek: The Next Generation episode "Who Watches the Watchers". Meanwhile, Taylor and Braga auditioned over 50 unknown actors. The crew hoped to get a classically trained actor, as they wanted to ensure that they did not show any 20th-century mannerisms in the portrayal of a futuristic character.

Wise was given the role, which required a lengthy makeup routine for each day's performance. The prosthetics were created by makeup supervisor Michael Westmore, who wanted him to have a human appearance when viewed straight on but when seen from the side to appear more alien. Rather than create a cast from Wise's head for the skull extension, Westmore based it off an earlier prosthetic created for the Vorgons in The Next Generation episode "Captain's Holiday". The design had been created by Westmore a year earlier for another series. A cast was taken of Wise's face, and some pieces were created to help the prosthetics appear seamless. The application of the makeup typically took just over an hour and a half each day.

Costume designer Robert Blackman created the costume for Arturis, who noted that the character was "diabolical" but didn't want this to be given away through the costume immediately. In order to make him look "curious and affable", he placed the character in a shirt and pair of trousers. Where the script called for him to be shot by weapons fire, a burn on the shirt was created by key costumer Kimberley Shull using the hair color product Streaks and Tips. It was initially darker than intended, but the residue cleaned off to the desired level. Prop creator Alan Sims created Arturis' pistol weapon, intending for it to be held horizontally to give it a more alien appearance. It was made from two molds of a generic pistol weapon created for The Next Generation.

=== Filming, editing and music ===
Filming began late in the day on February 28, as the shoot on "One" had overrun, the production team had hoped to have the shoot for "Hope and Fear" underway the day prior. The two scenes which were filmed on February 28 both took place on the standing Voyager sets, with adjustments made to the lighting by cinematographer Marvin V. Rush. The shooting wrapped for the day at 1:45am, with four of the six planned scenes unfilmed and needing to be fit elsewhere into the schedule. The seventh day of filming on March 9 saw the movement of the shoot to the Dauntless engineering set. The design proposed by Kolbe did not make it into production due to the cost and complexity of it, but he was still pleased with the final result as it enabled some different shooting positions than the usual Voyager set.

The engineering set did provide some challenges; a health and safety brief was required for the actors on it as it was still raised off the ground. Furthermore, the results of the bubbles being sent through water tubes that represented part of the engine core created noise issues for the sound technicians; they asked for it to be turned off whenever it wasn't placed in shot. One of the special effects went wrong, causing an actual explosion behind Jeri Ryan rather than simply creating sparks following the weapons fire which would be edited in during post-optical effects. The explosion remained in the final cut. The final day of the shoot took place on March 10; taking the filming period to eight days, a day longer than normal for Voyager episodes. It took place on the set of the Dauntless bridge, in the orange color scheme. The final full scene filmed was of the scene at the end of the episode where the Dauntless returns to Borg space and Arturis realises he is about to be assimilated, and after an hour of closeups for various scenes, the shoot ended at 12:50am on March 11.

Editing began later that day, with the first rough cut completed on March 18. A version was screened on March 30 for Moore, Peter Lauritson, Dan Curry, J. P. Farrell and Dawn Velazquez to better inform the post-production optical effects which were under production at the time. Cast audio re-recording took place from April 9 onwards depending on the individual actor's availability, supervised by Velazquez. Composer Dennis McCarthy first saw a cut of the episode on April 21. He worked with Velazquez and music editor Gerry Sackman to develop some musical cues which could recur throughout the episode as well as working out what type of work will need to be completed. For example, although he couldn't see the visual effects at the time as they were not yet complete, Velazquez explained what they should look like.

The deadline for the final cut, including the visual effects was April 30. All elements of the episode had been completed with the exception of the soundtrack, the recording for which began on May 5. The recording was light-hearted, with McCarthy working some jokes into the titles of the musical pieces, such as The War of the Buttons and a reference to the end of the season, with a piece entitled An Ode to Summer. In two of the pieces, McCarthy worked in Jerry Goldsmith's Voyager theme, both at the end of the episode and several bars of it as the ship engages the Dauntless in the slipstream.

== Reception ==
=== Ratings ===
"Hope and Fear" was first broadcast on May 20, 1998, on UPN at 9pm Eastern Standard Time. According to Nielsen Media Research, it received ratings of 4.1/7 percent. This meant that it was watched by 4.1 percent of all televisions in the United States, and seven percent of those watching television at the time. This placed it in 76th place overall for the week, higher than all other programmes on UPN and The WB with the exception of Dawson's Creek. It was an increase of 0.2 percent from the previous episode, "One", and was the highest rated episode since the second part of "The Killing Game" on March 4. But it saw a decrease from the season three finale, the first part of "Scorpion", of 1.5 percent. It also saw a decline in viewers since the opening episode of season four, the second half of "Scorpion", which was watched by 6.5/10 percent of viewers.

=== Critical reception ===
Jamahl Epsicokhan, at his website Jammer's Reviews, gave "Hope and Fear" two out of four. Prior to airing, he considered the possibility that the crew might actually return home and thus the series would go in a different direction. This was based on the involvement of Berman in the writing, the length of time for the crew returning home matching the summer hiatus and the possibility that the fifth series would cover the crew's reintegration into Federation society. After watching "Hope and Fear", he said "At its fundamental core, a story like "Hope and Fear" strikes me as almost completely pointless." He said that once again, the status quo of the series was maintained and nothing of note changes. He called the score "wonderous", the sets "impressive" and the direction of the episode "stellar", but said that the plot was "cobbled together out of unlikely coincidences and prior story events that have been twisted to fit the end result."

Lisa Granshaw listed "Hope and Fear" as one of the top ten episodes of Voyager for Blastr, saying that it showed an important step in the development of Seven of Nine as the character declares that she does not want to return to the Borg. Juliette Harrisson at Den of Geek described the fourth season as the strongest in the series, and highlighted "Hope and Fear" as one of seven episodes to watch from that season. When reviewing the DVD release for the website DVD Active, Benjamin Willcock called "Hope and Fear" "wonderful, clever and incredibly fun", and added that while it wasn't a "typical Voyager finale", it was one of the "more memorable and sophisticated" ones from the later seasons.

In 2016, The Hollywood Reporter rated "Hope and Fear" the eighth best episode of Star Trek: Voyager. In 2015, it was rated as among the top ten episodes of the series by SyFy.

SyFy recommend "Hope and Fear" for their Seven of Nine binge-watching guide in 2019.

In 2020, SyFy ranked this the fourth best episode of Star Trek: Voyager, commending it as a "landmark episode" and that takes the audience deeper in the relationship between Captain Janeway and Seven of Nine; a conflict and its resolution. They praise a fitting but tragic ending that leaves the audience and crew with a renewed sense about of hope with their journey back to Earth, while having explored the morality of revenge.

== Home media release and legacy ==
"Hope and Fear" was first released for home media use on VHS within the United Kingdom as part of the collection of two-episode issues alongside "One" in 1998. The episode was first released on DVD as part of the fourth season release on September 28, 2004 in the United States. This was followed by a release in the United Kingdom on November 1, which was subsequently re-released on September 24, 2007.

The Dauntless was subsequently included in video games and merchandise spin-offs. It was added to the massively multiplayer online role-playing game Star Trek Online in 2014, initially as part of the "Delta Rising: Operations Pack" in conjunction with the Delta Rising expansion. In 2015, it was released as an expansion to Star Trek: Attack Wing, a wargame produced by WizKids. The ship was also the subject of issue 17 of the Official Starship Collection based on the franchise and released by Eaglemoss Publications.
