= Imperfection (Star Trek: Voyager) =

- Star Trek: Voyager episode
- Episode no.: Season 7 Episode 2
- Directed by: David Livingston
- Story by: André Bormanis
- Teleplay by: Carleton Eastlake; Robert Doherty
- Production code: 248
- Original air date: October 11, 2000

Guest appearances
- Manu Intiraymi - Icheb; Marley S. McClean - Mezoti; Kurt Wetherill - Azan; Cody Wetherill - Rebi; Debbie Grattan - Wysanti; Michael McFall - Salvage Alien #1

Episode chronology
← Previous "Unimatrix Zero, Part II"	Next → "Drive"
- Star Trek: Voyager season 7

"Imperfection" is the 148th episode of Star Trek: Voyager, the second episode of the seventh season. The ex-Borg Seven of Nine (Jeri Ryan) has a medical technology crisis that must be resolved by the crew of the USS Voyager, lost far from Earth in the 24th century. This episode involves the cybernetic Borg aliens, which were previously introduced on Star Trek: The Next Generation.

== Plot ==
U.S.S. Voyager encounters a Wysanti starship, which is from the same homeworld as Rebi and Azan. The Wysanti offer to take in the two children, as well as Mezoti, leaving Icheb the remaining child that Voyager had rescued from the Borg. Icheb and Seven of Nine discuss their feelings about the others' departures, and Icheb sees that Seven is crying. She instead believes her ocular implant is malfunctioning and goes to sick bay. The Doctor agrees it is a malfunction and treats Seven, but she continues to experience headaches and strange feelings.

After successfully completing analysis of a nebula in Astrometrics, Icheb asks Seven for more challenging assignments on the bridge, then states that he would like to study under Tuvok and Seven to pass the Starfleet Academy entrance exam. Seven offers to get a letter of reference from Captain Janeway. She finds her hand is shaking, and excuses herself to the cargo bay to attempt to regenerate, but the computer refuses to engage as it states Seven's cortical node is malfunctioning. Unable to regenerate, Seven goes to the mess hall and consumes several glasses of her nutritional supplement in an attempt to make up for not regenerating. Neelix finds her there in the morning when he enters to start breakfast. When Seven starts to leave the mess hall she collapses as other Borg implants begin to appear on her body.

In sick bay, the Doctor reports that they cannot repair the node, and Seven will likely die without a replacement. Discovering a nearby Borg debris field, Janeway, Tom Paris and Tuvok take the Delta Flyer to find a replacement node. They are briefly waylaid by raiders that claim the field as their own, but they manage to chase them off, and leave with a node from a long-dead drone. The Doctor simulates the transplant of the new node into Seven, but each run is unsuccessful, as the node has been inactive for too long. Seven prepares to accept that she might die. Though the Doctor has confined her to Sick Bay, Seven deactivates him and goes to speak to B'Elanna Torres about the nature of death, worried that as she is no longer tied to the Borg collective, her contributions will be lost. Torres assures her that she has helped the crew tremendously, and will have a legacy on Voyager.

Icheb, aware of Seven's condition, offers to give up his cortical node for Seven. As he was not fully assimilated by the Borg, he will be able to survive without it. The Doctor simulates the transplant and agrees it has a high chance of success, but Seven refuses to allow Icheb to do this. Icheb purposely programs his alcove to disengage the node, causing his health to falter. He is rushed to sick bay, but refuses to allow treatment to remove the node unless Seven is willing to accept it. Seven remains steadfast; she refuses to take the node. Janeway, Seven, and Icheb debate, but eventually all agree to allow Icheb's node to be removed and used to replace Seven's. The operation is successful, though Icheb must spend several days in sick bay to regain his health. Seven tells Icheb his actions were foolish and emotional, but then thanks him, and promises to help him prepare for the academy entrance exam. Icheb agrees, and Seven finds she is crying once more, though her new node is functioning perfectly.

== Continuity ==
Events in this episode are referenced in the Star Trek: Picard episode "Stardust City Rag", which also features a cameo by Icheb.

When Seven displays a list of crew members that have died under Captain Janeway's command, seven of the names are characters from the TV show The West Wing.

== Reception ==
Jammer's Reviews ranked "Imperfection" with 3 out of 4 stars and a summation of "a nicely done allegory on terminal illness," noting that the story "pitch" was said to have been based on a true story about a kidney transplant from the perspectives of both the donor and the patient. Jamahl Epsicokhan concludes that it was "a solid story with some well-sold emotions."

SyFy recommend this episode for their Seven of Nine binge-watching guide.

== Releases ==
This episode was released in the U.K. on VHS paired with "Unimatrix, Part II" (both episodes on one cassette).

On December 21, 2003, this episode was released on DVD as part of a Season 7 boxset; Star Trek Voyager: Complete Seventh Season.
