= Demon (Star Trek: Voyager) =

- Star Trek: Voyager episode
- Episode no.: Season 4 Episode 24
- Directed by: Anson Williams
- Story by: André Bormanis
- Teleplay by: Kenneth Biller
- Production code: 192
- Original air date: May 6, 1998

Guest appearances
- Alexander Enberg – Ens. Vorik; Susan Lewis – Transporter Technician

Episode chronology
← Previous "Living Witness"	Next → "One"
- Star Trek: Voyager season 4

"Demon" is the 92nd episode of Star Trek: Voyager, the 24th episode of the fourth season. The crew of USS Voyager, a 24th-century spacecraft trying to get back to Earth, land on planet in search of supplies. However, two crewmen are lost and the Captain investigates.

== Plot ==
With their deuterium supplies dwindling, Captain Janeway orders the crew of Voyager to reduce power consumption to minimal levels, traveling at impulse power and confining the crew to a few decks. Seven of Nine detects signs of deuterium on a nearby planet, which Chakotay quickly identifies as a "demon"-class planet, hostile to living creatures due to its high surface temperature and toxic atmosphere. With no way to remotely extract the deuterium due to communication interference from the atmosphere, Harry Kim volunteers himself and Tom Paris to take a shuttlecraft to the surface using modified shield technology and extract the essential materials themselves. As they track down the deuterium deposits on the surface, they discover a metallic liquid that maintains a cool temperature despite the atmosphere. Kim falls in a pool of this liquid, Paris is able to pull him out but Kim's environmental suit is damaged. Soon both their environmental suits fail, and they collapse.

When Paris and Kim fail to return to Voyager after some time, Janeway orders the ship to land on the surface to send out teams to find them. Chakotay and Seven of Nine discover the two alive, but out of the suits and apparently able to withstand the harsh conditions. With a supply of deuterium to continue their journey home, they return to Voyager but Kim and Paris start to suffocate once aboard until the Doctor can contain a supply of the planet's atmosphere. The Doctor discovers both men have a large quantity of the metallic liquid in their blood, and explains that because the planet's atmosphere is impossible to recreate safely, should Voyager leave, they would have to leave the two behind. Torres discovers the liquid has the ability to take on the form of organic material.

Chakotay, Seven and Kim return to the planet to find the much needed deuterium and are able to retrieve some. They also discover the barely-alive Kim and Paris, still within the environmental suits running on emergency backup power. The two are safely returned to Voyager, and the Doctor realizes that the other Kim and Paris are actually clones created by the metallic liquid, using the DNA from the human crew members to construct the bodies. Soon, a pool of the liquid forms beneath the ship, trapping it. When they try to lift off, the pool under the ship reacts, causing it to sink more. Janeway is able to talk to the Kim clone, and reaches out to this new intelligence, a "silver blood", who explains that it has acquired sentience when it came in contact with Paris and Kim, and wants to keep the Voyager crew around for companionship. Janeway proposes to the silver blood that it can clone any member of the crew that volunteers, allowing it to create duplicates of the crew for itself, in exchange for releasing the ship. The creature agrees, and soon Voyager lifts off, leaving numerous crew clones on the planet.

== Continuity ==
The season 5 episode "Course: Oblivion" is a direct sequel of this episode and concerns the fate of the crew duplicates.

== Reception ==
In 2015, WhatCulture ranked this episode the 28th best Star Trek episode of the franchise. They praised this episode as feeling more like a "classic Trek", describing it as "clever, speculative, and philosophical."

Conversely, Keith R. A. DeCandido ranked it a 1/10 and the worst episode of Voyager's 4th season. DeCandido thought the premise was ludicrous, as deuterium is an isotope of the most common element in the universe (hydrogen); too much of the episode was uninteresting filler; and that the episode betrays its own premise by presenting a hostile planet, yet allowing the crew to ignore or circumvent the alleged danger with seemingly no ill-effects in the second half of the episode.

== See also ==
- Aquiel (Star Trek: The Next Generation episode)
