= Repression (Star Trek: Voyager) =

- Star Trek: Voyager episode
- Episode no.: Season 7 Episode 4
- Directed by: Winrich Kolbe
- Story by: Kenneth Biller
- Teleplay by: Mark Haskell Smith
- Production code: 251
- Original air date: October 25, 2000

Guest appearances
- Derek McGrath – Chell; Keith Szarabajka – Teero; Jad Mager – Ensign Tabor; Ronald Robinson – Sek; Carol Krnic – Jor; Scott Alan Smith – Doyle; Mark Rafael Truitt – Yosa

Episode chronology
← Previous "Drive"	Next → "Critical Care"
- Star Trek: Voyager season 7

"Repression" is the 150th episode of the science fiction television series Star Trek: Voyager, and the fourth episode of the seventh (and final) season of the series. It revisits potential conflict between Starfleet and Maquis crew members explored in "Worst Case Scenario" at the end of season three.

A series of attacks against former Maquis crew members baffles the Voyager senior staff. It is unclear how many former-Maquis crewmen were exposed to mind control techniques.

== Plot ==
A Bajoran is shown recording a message.

Onboard USS Voyager, former Maquis member Ensign Tabor (Jad Mager) is found comatose. The Doctor finds evidence Tabor was attacked; Captain Janeway assigns Tuvok to investigate.

Soon there are five comatose crewmen in Sickbay, with the same injuries, all former Maquis. Tuvok notes that the assailant must have access to security protocols to avoid detection. Tuvok, Tom Paris and Kim capture a negative image of Tabor's assailant.

While investigating, Chakotay is suddenly attacked and rendered unconscious by Tuvok. Tuvok has no memory of this and continues his investigation. All the victims recover but have no memory of being attacked. Tuvok meditates and has flashbacks of attacking the former Maquis members, and has a vision of the Bajoran. Tuvok realizes the negative image matches his own description.

Janeway discovers a message to Tuvok from the Bajoran, a former Maquis named Teero Anaydis who experimented with mind control; his message triggered Tuvok to 'attack' other Maquis members. Tuvok sends a message to his 'victims,' who then take control of Voyager. However, Janeway helps Tuvok regain control of his mind, and Tuvok performs mindmelds to restore his victims and retake the ship. The recovered crew attend a movie on the holodeck.

== Continuity ==
This is also the only on-screen mention of the name of Chakotay's Maquis ship, the Val Jean, as seen on Teero Anaydis' computer screen. One of the writers for "Repression" named it after Jean Valjean, the hero of Les Misérables, but a typographical error occurred resulting in "Val Jean".

== Reception ==
Jammer's Reviews only gave "Repression" 1.5 stars out of 4 asking "why?" the story's destination is so "woefully contrived" and "completely pointless." Jamahl Epsicokhan summed up by saying that a "real mutiny" might have been interesting in the earlier seasons, but in the last year it would've been just "inappropriate" and not a "real issue."

In 2020, io9 listed this episode as one of the "must watch" episodes from season seven of the show.

== Home media releases ==
On December 21, 2003, this episode was released on DVD as part of a Season 7 boxset; Star Trek Voyager: Complete Seventh Season.

== See also ==
- Face of the Enemy (Star Trek: The Next Generation) (Deanna Troi works as a spy)
