= The Disease =

- Star Trek: Voyager episode
- Episode no.: Season 5 Episode 16
- Directed by: David Livingston
- Story by: Kenneth Biller
- Teleplay by: Michael Taylor
- Production code: 210
- Original air date: February 24, 1999

Guest appearances
- Musetta Vander - Tal; Christopher Liam Moore - Varro Stowaway; Charles Rocket - Jippeq; Majel Barrett - Computer Voice

Episode chronology
← Previous "Dark Frontier"	Next → "Course: Oblivion"
- Star Trek: Voyager season 5

"The Disease" is the 111th episode of the science fiction television series Star Trek: Voyager, the 16th episode of the fifth season. It focuses on a plot with Harry Kim (played by Garrett Wang) as USS Voyager encounters a unique civilization on an extremely large starship.

This episode was written by Michael Taylor from a story by Kenneth Biller, and directed by David Livingston. It aired on UPN on February 24, 1999. Guest stars include Charles Rocket, Christopher Liam Moore and Musetta Vander.

The episode features one of the largest spacecraft in the Star Trek franchise up to that time, the Varro Generational Ship.

== Plot ==
Voyager stops to assist a xenophobic species known as the Varro. This species lives on a generational ship which has housed them for 400 years. While the crew works on the Varro ship, Voyager is infested with synthetic ship-eating parasites that had been released on the Varro ship by a dissident Varro. Meanwhile, Harry Kim becomes intimate with Varro scientist Tal, and develops a physiological bond with her, one that is standard in the Varro. The physiological connection alters his behavior and sways him from his duties aboard Voyager.

It is later revealed that Tal is one of the separatists. There has been a rumor of a minority of Varro that want off the ship. The parasites that Tal helped create were made to separate the individual pods of the Varro ship without destroying the ship itself. Fractures along the hull created by the parasites begin to grow as the Varro ship begins to fall apart. Voyager's docking port is jammed, trapping it with the Varro ship. If the explosions get to Voyager, it would be destroyed as well. However, Harry comes up with a plan to extend Voyager's integrity field around the unstable ship. This gives the Varro enough time to stabilize the parasites.

Once the parasites have been stabilized, Voyager breaks free as the Varro ship experiences multiple breaches and the individual pods of the ship begin to break free. The majority of the Varro remain together in separate pods but the minority group that wanted to leave is allowed to do so. Later, Harry must painfully say good-bye to his recent love.

== Production ==
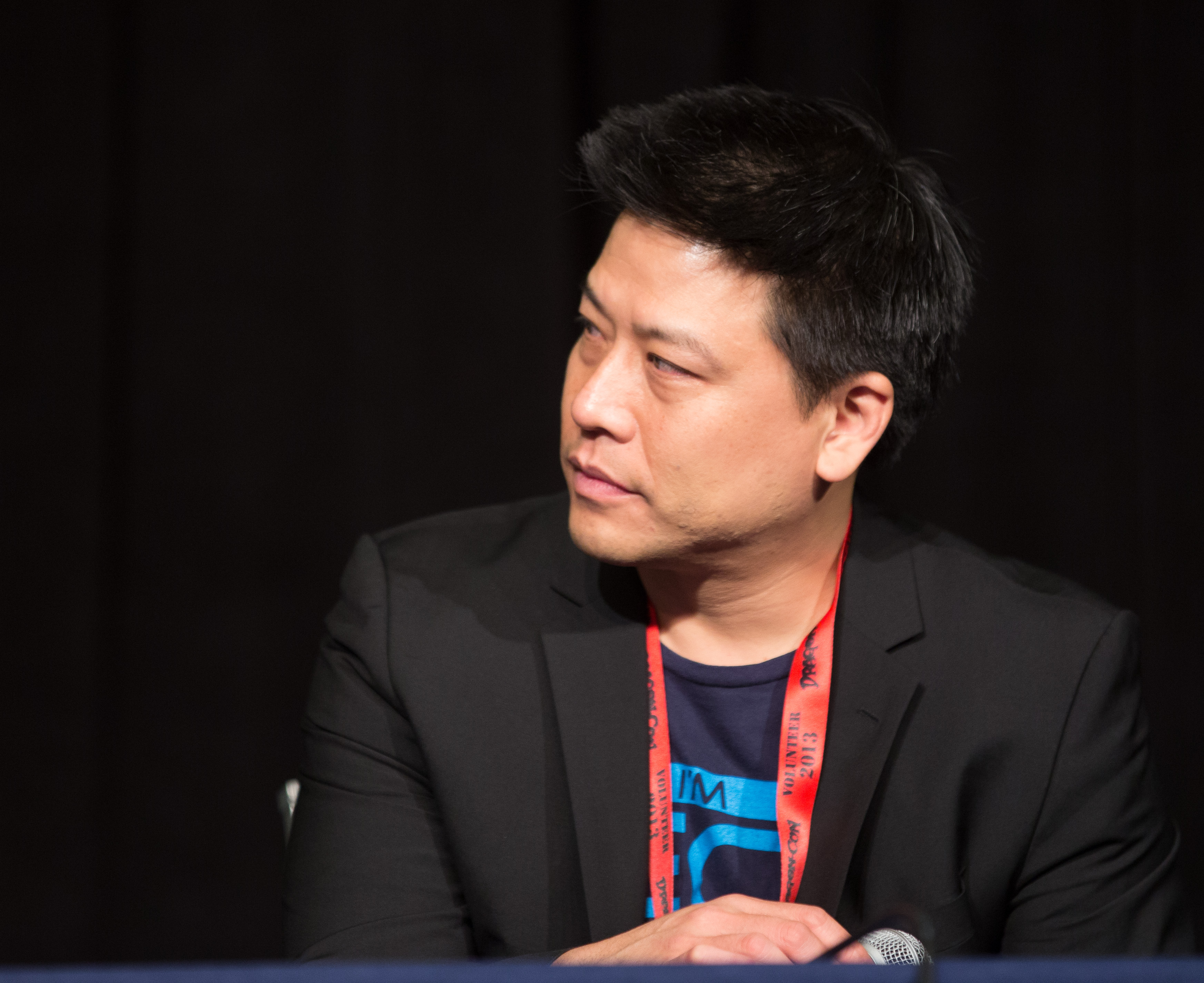
Garret Wang is cast as Harry Kim;this character is in the spotlight in this episode as he works through a difficult alien romance.

The episode was directed by David Livingston. Livingston directed many Star Trek episodes in this era, including for Star Trek: The Next Generation (1987-1994), Star Trek: Deep Space Nine (1993-1999), Star Trek: Voyager, and Enterprise. Overall he directed 62 episodes of Star Trek, including 28 for Voyager.

Christopher Liam Moore is cast as the stowaway, and he had also been cast as a Voth in the episode "Distant Origin".

Musetta Vander was originally cast as Noss in the episode Gravity. When she had to turn the role down due to scheduling conflicts, she was offered the role of Tal instead.

=== Special effects ===
This episode features the fictional Star Trek spacecraft the Varro Generational Ship, which was noted in 2015 as one of the largest fictional spacecraft featured in science fiction television and movies up to that time. At about 9.3 kilometers (5.8 miles) in length the Varro spacecraft is only slightly smaller than the Voth City Ship which was also featured in Star Trek: Voyager. The biggest was rated as the Alien Mother ship in the 1996 film Independence Day, and the biggest Star Trek vessel up to that time was V’Ger featured in the 1979 film Star Trek: The Motion Picture. The visual effect shots of the Varro ship were done computer generated graphics by Foundation Imaging.

== Reception ==
"The Disease" had a rating of 7/10 on TV.com as of 2019. Den of Geek included this episode on a binge watching guide that included a roadmap of episodes which, although not typically achieving high ratings, might still be entertaining. Tor.com felt the episode had some good concepts but did not capitalize on them well; they note the Generational ship was interesting and pointed out this had been explored previously in the franchise in the original series episode "For the World is Hollow and I Have Touched the Sky". They were also happy with guest star Musetta Vander, who they said was "radiant and magnificent and charming and delightful".

== Releases ==
"The Disease" debuted on the television network UPN (United Paramount Network) on February 24, 1999. It was released on VHS as a Collector's Edition, paired with the episode "Course: Oblivion".

"The Disease" was released on LaserDisc in Japan on June 22, 2001, as part of 5th Season Vol. 2, which included episodes from "Dark Frontier" to "Equinox, Part I". The episode had two audio tracks, English and Japanese. This set had 6 double sided 12" optical discs giving a total runtime of 552 minutes.

It was also released on VHS paired with "Course: Oblivion".

On November 9, 2004, this episode was released as part of the season 5 DVD box set of Star Trek: Voyager. The box set includes 7 DVD optical discs with all the episodes in season 5 with some extra features, and episodes have a Dolby Digital 5.1 surround sound audio track.

== See also ==
- Spacecraft in Star Trek
- Stigma (Star Trek: Enterprise), also explores alien STI concept
