= Juggernaut (Star Trek: Voyager) =

- Star Trek: Voyager episode
- Episode no.: Season 5 Episode 21
- Directed by: Allan Kroeker
- Story by: Bryan Fuller
- Teleplay by: Bryan Fuller; Nick Sagan; Kenneth Biller
- Production code: 215
- Original air date: April 26, 1999

Guest appearances
- Ron Canada - Fesek; Lee Arenberg - Pelk; Scott Klace - Dremk; Alexander Enberg - Malon #3

Episode chronology
← Previous "Think Tank"	Next → "Someone to Watch Over Me"
- Star Trek: Voyager season 5

"Juggernaut" is the 115th episode of the science fiction television series Star Trek: Voyager, the 21st episode of the fifth season. This episode features several guest stars as the Malons, a species introduced in this season's first episode ("Night"), and focuses on B'Elanna (played by Roxann Dawson).

In the episode, aliens are having trouble with their spacecraft, and the crew of the USS Voyager needs to help. Solving the problem turns out to have some unexpected difficulties.

This episode has a story by Bryan Fuller, and is directed by Allan Kroeker.

== Plot ==
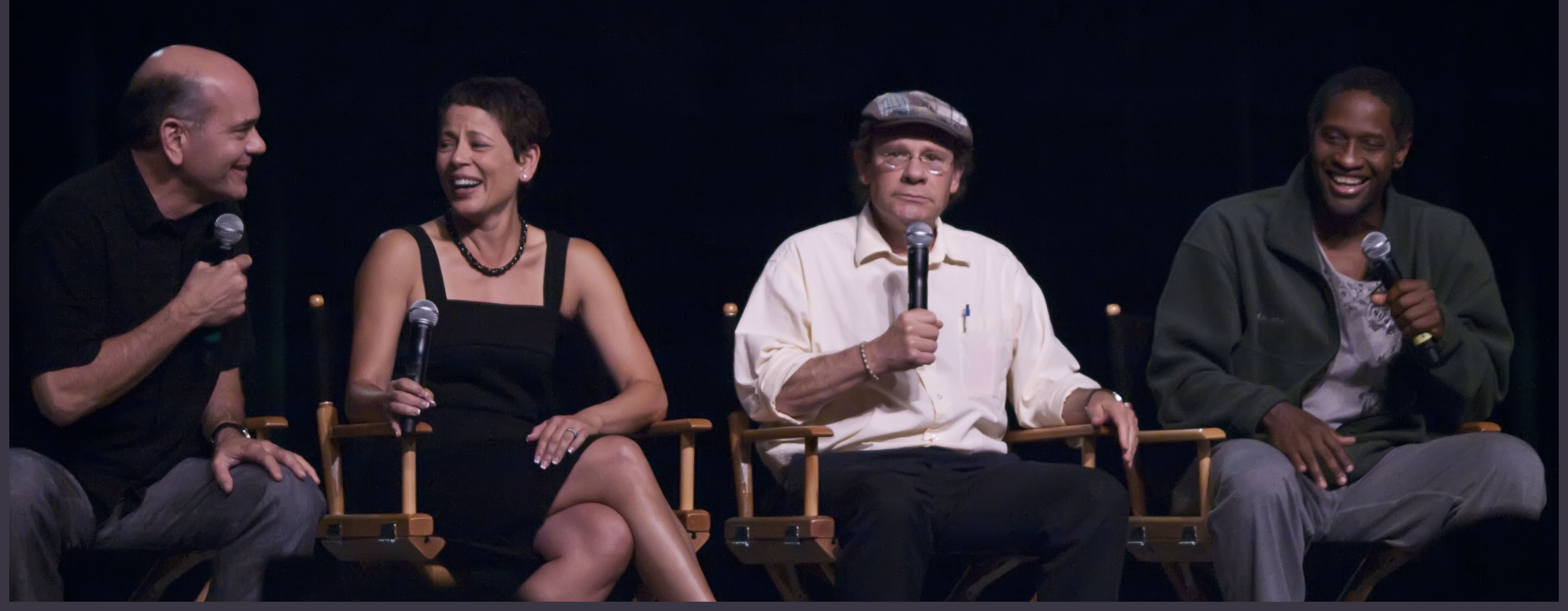
This episode features the usual main cast of Voyager; Chief Engineer B'Elanna is in the spotlight, played by Roxann Dawson. from left to right - Robert Picardo, Roxann Dawson, Ethan Phillips, Tim Russ

As Tuvok attempts to teach B'Elanna Torres meditation to calm her violent tendencies, Voyager detects escape pods from a damaged Malon freighter. As they rescue two surviving Malons, they learn that the freighter, transporting deadly theta radioactive waste, is set to explode in a few hours, which would destroy everything within three light years. Unable to clear the potential explosion in time, Captain Kathryn Janeway orders Voyager towards the freighter, anticipating bringing the ship's containment system back on line to contain the explosion in time.

The surviving Malons, Fesek and Pelk, work with Voyager's crew to determine how to effect repairs as fast as possible. Most of the decks of the Malon freighter are flooded with radiation, and to reach the control deck, they will need to evacuate the radiation from each deck prior to it. Chakotay, Torres, and Neelix join Fesek and Pelk on the freighter. As they work, Pelk is attacked and killed by some creature, which Fesek claims is "the Vihaar", a type of legend among Malons. Torres is angered to learn from Fesek how little Malons value life, but keeps her anger in check.

During one deck evacuation, the deck they are on is exposed to the vacuum of space; Voyager is forced to transport Chakotay back but the others escape to the next deck. Torres continues to lead the group towards the control deck. Meanwhile, Tuvok offers Janeway a backup plan, nudging the trajectory of the freighter towards a nearby star, such that the theta radiation would be contained within its corona. The away team finally reaches the command center and attempt to reenergize the containment fields. They are attacked by the same creature that killed Pelk - the supposed Vihaar, in actuality one of the ship's Malon core workers heavily deformed by the theta radiation. He knocks Fesek and Neelix unconscious and attempts to alter the freighter's course. Torres becomes enraged and attacks the Malon, giving her enough time to secure the area and allow Voyager to transport her and the others aboard before the freighter explodes harmlessly within the star. Torres is commended for keeping her calm by the crew, but takes a moment for herself after exhibiting her bout of violence.

== Reception ==
SyFy said this was the 18th best episode Bryan Fuller wrote for, but was unhappy with yet another episode about B'Elanna being angry and called this a "snoozefest". Den of Geek ranked it the 19th best Bryan Fuller episode, noting topics of anger, pollution and a focus on B'Elanna.

== Releases ==
"Juggernaut" was released on LaserDisc in Japan on June 22, 2001, as part of 5th Season Vol. 2, which included episodes from "Dark Frontier" to "Equinox, Part I". The episode had two audio tracks, English and Japanese. This set had 6 double sided 12" optical discs giving a total runtime of 552 minutes.

"Someone to Watch Over Me" and "Juggernaut" were released together on one VHS tape.

On November 9, 2004, this episode was released as part of the Season 5 DVD box set of Star Trek: Voyager. The box set includes 7 DVD optical discs and the audio track includes a Dolby 5.1 Digital Audio format.
