= Night (Star Trek: Voyager) =

- Star Trek: Voyager episode
- Episode no.: Season 5 Episode 1
- Directed by: David Livingston
- Written by: Brannon Braga; Joe Menosky
- Cinematography by: Marvin V. Rush
- Production code: 195
- Original air date: October 14, 1998

Guest appearances
- Ken Magee - Controller Emck; Martin Rayner - Dr. Chaotica; Steven Dennis- Night Alien; Steven Rankin - Night Alien

Episode chronology
← Previous "Hope and Fear"	Next → "Drone"
- Star Trek: Voyager season 5

"Night" is the 95th episode of the American science fiction television series Star Trek: Voyager, the first episode of the fifth season. In this episode, as the starship USS Voyager crosses an enormous expanse with no stars visible, they encounter local denizens whose home is being used as a dumping ground for toxic waste by the Malon aliens. The void is said to be size of about two years of travel for the Voyager spacecraft.

This episode originally aired on UPN on October 14, 1998. The Malon species return in episode 21 of this season, "Juggernaut".

== Overview ==
This episode was directed by David Livingston, and written by Brannon Braga and Joe Menosky.

== Plot ==
En route towards the Alpha Quadrant, the Federation starship Voyager is forced to travel through a sector of space, "The Void", where starlight is shrouded, creating a dense black cloud. The journey through this sector will take two years, but only two months into the travel has set the crew on edge. Left with nothing to do in the empty darkness, Captain Janeway has taken the time to reflect on their situation, feeling intense guilt for her choices that left the crew stranded in the Delta Quadrant.

One day, all power to the ship is knocked out, caused by an external field. They discover several alien intruders aboard Voyager and are able to capture one, dubbing it a Night Alien. They manage to restore power, discovering themselves surrounded by three smaller ships, but soon these are chased away by a larger ship of different design. Its pilot introduces himself to the Voyager crew as Emck, a Malon. After learning of Voyager's plight, he offers to lead the ship to a vortex that can lead them to the other side of The Void, in exchange for the Night Alien. Janeway refuses until she learns more.

The Night Alien in Sickbay is dying of theta radiation but after learning that Voyager has no hostile intentions, apologizes for his species' actions. They are a people that are trying to fight the Malon, as the Malon dump toxic theta radiation into The Void, harming their species. The Night Alien is transported off Voyager by its fellow people before it dies. Janeway then tells Emck that she knows what's really going on and attempts to arrange a deal with him, to provide him with Federation technology to recycle the theta radiation into useful energy and matter in exchange for passage to the vortex, but Emck refuses, as this technology would ruin his livelihood as a waste hauler.

Janeway learned of the vortex's location from the Night Alien and she attempts to order the crew to send Voyager through the vortex while she stays behind in a shuttle craft to destroy it, ending the Malon's use of The Void as a dumping ground. The crew refuses, acknowledging that they do not blame Janeway or harbor resentment for her actions that stranded them in the Delta Quadrant. They come up with a second plan, to launch torpedoes shortly after entering the vortex, riding out the shock wave as the vortex is destroyed. As Voyager approaches the vortex, they are attacked by the Malon, but soon the smaller Night Alien ships reappear and attack the Malon long enough for Voyager to destroy Emck's vessel before entering and destroying the vortex. The journey leaves them but a short distance from the edge of The Void and within minutes, the Voyager crew is elated to see stars once again.

== Reception ==
Ian Grey at RogertEbert.com noted this episode in 2013 in their feature on Star Trek: Voyager, suggested "Night" as an example of the best of science fiction television stories, commenting that it can stand "toe-to-toe with the most provocative science fiction in TV history."

In 2020, io9 listed this episode as one of the "must watch" episodes from season five of the show.

== Releases ==
On November 9, 2004, this episode was released as part of the season 5 DVD box set of Star Trek: Voyager. The box set includes 7 DVD optical discs with all the episodes in season 5 with some extra features, and the audio track for the episodes includes Dolby 5.1 Digital Audio.

On April 25, 2001, this episode was released on LaserDisc in Japan, as part of the half-season collection, 5th Season vol.1 . This included episodes from "Night" to "Bliss" on seven double sided 12 inch optical discs, with English and Japanese audio tracks for the episodes.
