= USS Rhode Island =

There have been three ships of the United States Navy named USS Rhode Island, after the American state.

- USS Rhode Island (1860), a wooden sidewheel steamer previously named John P. King and Eagle, and later renamed Charleston that saw action in the Civil War.
- USS Rhode Island (BB-17), a Virginia-class battleship, sailed on the first leg of the Great White Fleet's voyage, and provided anti-submarine services during World War I.
- USS Rhode Island (SSBN-730), an Ohio-class submarine, laid down in 1981, and renamed USS Henry M. Jackson soon after.
- USS Rhode Island (SSBN-740), an Ohio-class submarine launched in 1993
