= Unimatrix Zero =

26th episode of the 6th and 1st episode of the 7th season of Star Trek: Voyager

- Star Trek: Voyager episodes
- Episode nos.: Season 6 and 7 Episodes 26 and 1
- Directed by: Allan Kroeker (part I); Mike Vejar (part II)
- Story by: Mike Sussman (parts I&II); Brannon Braga (part II); Joe Menosky (part II)
- Teleplay by: Brannon Braga; Joe Menosky
- Production codes: 246 and 247
- Original air dates: May 24, 2000; October 4, 2000

Guest appearances
- Susanna Thompson - Borg Queen; Mark Deakins - Axum; Jerome Butler - General Korok; Joanna Heimbold - Laura; Ryan Sparks - Alien Child; Tony Sears - Borg Drone; Andrew Palmer - Errant Drone; Clay Storseth - Alien Man

Episode chronology
← Previous "The Haunting of Deck Twelve"	Next → "Imperfection"

"Unimatrix Zero" is a two-part episode of Star Trek: Voyager, the cliffhanger between 26th episode of the sixth season and the first episode of the seventh season. Starfleet's USS Voyager, stranded on the other side of the Galaxy, once again encounters a race of cybernetic organisms called the Borg as the ship journeys back to Earth.

The two parts aired separately. The story features the Borg Queen, played by Susanna Thompson.

== Plot ==
=== Part I ===
Seven of Nine dreams of a beautiful forest, which in reality is a subconscious realm inhabited by the minds of certain Borg drones during their regeneration periods. Only a few drones possess the recessive gene required to experience the realm called Unimatrix Zero.

In the utopian Unimatrix Zero, Borg of various species and ages (including children) exist as their individual, unassimilated selves while regenerating on their Borg ships; when not regenerating, they revert to normal drones with no memory of time spent there. The Borg Queen is aware of Unimatrix Zero, considering it a disease, and destroys drones discovered capable of visiting there. However, the process of detecting affected drones is time consuming and she is eager to find a faster method of finding and deactivating them. Those who are detected are deactivated, dismembered, and studied in an effort to speed up the search.

Seven of Nine journeys with Captain Janeway, thanks to a double mind-meld performed by Tuvok, to Unimatrix Zero and reverts to Annika Hansen, her human identity before assimilation. She discovers she used to visit Unimatrix Zero when she belonged to the Borg Collective. Her forgotten lover Axum made contact with her so she may help them; the inhabitants of Unimatrix Zero have developed a masking nanovirus to inoculate them from detection by the Queen, but it can only be administered from the corporeal world. Seven is overwhelmed by her new-found emotions and denies them but eventually finds acceptance. If Unimatrix Zero cannot be stopped in the real world, the Queen plans to destroy it from within by sending drones to kill the subconscious, unassimilated drones.

As Voyager plans to help the Unimatrix drones, the Borg Queen makes contact to offer Janeway transwarp technology if Janeway ceases to help the Unimatrix drones. Janeway refuses and plans to infiltrate a Borg ship on her own and release a version of the nanovirus, now modified to allow the Unimatrix Zero drones to retain their memories and stage a resistance. After being blackmailed by Chakotay (he threatens to have the Doctor remove her from command if she insists on going alone), she, Tuvok and B'Elanna penetrate the Borg cube to reach the central plexus and administer the nanovirus but are caught. Voyager leaves them to be assimilated.

=== Part II ===
The Janeway, Tuvok, and Torres drones proceed with their plan to help Unimatrix Zero. They are not connected to the Borg Collective as the Doctor had inoculated them with a neural inhibitor, protecting their individuality. Tuvok's inhibitor wears off and the Collective eventually overcomes his mind.

The Borg Queen confronts Janeway to demand the drones of Unimatrix Zero submit themselves for reassimilation. The Queen destroys several of her own ships because only a handful of crew are "offline" and suspected of being the newly sentient drones from the dream realm. Janeway calls her bluff, pointing out that such a tactic would essentially require her to destroy the entire Collective. Having discovered a means of sending Borg as drones into Unimatrix Zero, the Queen threatens to release a Borg-modified form of the nanovirus from within Unimatrix Zero to kill every affected inhabitant's corporeal drone, unless Janeway agrees to speak with them.

Janeway informs her crew that Unimatrix Zero can no longer exist. Chakotay realizes this means destroying the matrix so the Queen cannot spread the nanovirus. Seven is forced to say goodbye to her lover, who is on a Borg ship in the Beta Quadrant. Voyager, aided by a Borg sphere crewed by liberated drones, rescues the away team. Independent Borg who now, like the Queen, have the advantage of being self-aware, take command of some vessels, rebel, and start a civil war with the Collective.

== Background ==
The Borg are a Star Trek villain species famous for their phrase, "resistance is futile." TV Guide named the Borg at number 4 in its 2013 list of the 60 Nastiest Villains of All Time. The Borg was introduced on Star Trek: The Next Generation in the episode "Q Who?" (S2E16) and also featured in the critically acclaimed episode "The Best of Both Worlds". They made a major influence on Voyager starting with "Scorpion", which introduced the ex-Borg character Seven of Nine to the main cast, and there were many Borg-centric episodes since that time in the show; they return with a major story once again in Unimatrix.

== Reception ==
Ian Grey at RogerEbert.com noted this episode in their feature on Star Trek: Voyager, commenting that "Unimatrix Zero" offered a "revolution fought in the safety of dreams."

In 2022, SyFy Wire included "Unimatrix Zero" as one (Note: The SyFy Wire article treats the two-part / two-season episodes of "Unimatrix Zero" as one episode, doing the same for the similarly structured "Scorpion", when counting the number of episodes included in its list of 12.) of the 12 "essential" Seven of Nine episodes in the franchise.

Nerdist suggested watching "Unimatrix" as part of an abbreviated binge-watching guide featuring USS Voyager's confrontations with the Borg. SyFy Wire ranked "Unimatrix Zero" as one of the seven essential episodes about Borg to watch as background for Star Trek: Picard. Space.com also recommended watching this episode as background for Star Trek: Picard.

== Releases ==
"Unimatrix Zero, Part I" was released on VHS cassette paired with "Dark Frontier". "Unimatrix, Part II" was paired with "Imperfection" when released on VHS.

This episode was released as part of a season 6 DVD boxset on December 7, 2004.

"Unimatrix Zero" was also included as part of the DVD collection, Star Trek: Fan Collective – Borg released on March 7, 2006.

== See also ==
- Summary List of 2-Part episodes (Star Trek: Voyager)
- The Matrix (franchise)
- Virtual reality
