= Harry Kim (Star Trek) =

Character from Star Trek: Voyager

- Star Trek: Voyager; Star Trek: Lower Decks character
- Garrett Wang as Harry Kim (c. 1995)
- First appearance: "Caretaker"; January 16, 1995
- Last appearance: "Fissure Quest"; December 12, 2024
- Portrayed by: Garrett Wang

In-universe information
- Affiliation: Starfleet
- Posting: USS Voyager
- Rank: Ensign (VOY); Lieutenant (LDS); Admiral

Lieutenant Harry S. L. Kim is a fictional character who appeared in each of the seven seasons of the American television series Star Trek: Voyager. Portrayed by Garrett Wang, he is the Operations Officer aboard the Starfleet starship USS Voyager.

The character first appeared in the pilot episode of the series, "Caretaker". The character continued to appear throughout the series in a main cast role, with his final appearance in the finale, "Endgame". In that episode, an alternative future version of the character is seen as a Starfleet Captain. He is typically shown as being naive, especially in romantic situations, but gifted. The character finds the ship's first possible route home, and in one alternative future, he manages to develop a transwarp drive which allows him and Chakotay to travel home in a matter of hours but kills the rest of the crew. The producers had considered whether or not to kill off Kim during the third season. Wang subsequently reprised the role of Harry Kim for the fan-made Star Trek: Renegades. In 2024, Wang reprised the role as several alternate reality versions of Harry Kim in Star Trek: Lower Decks penultimate episode "Fissure Quest."

== Concept and development ==
Having never experienced adversity, he has fewer of the tools for coping than some of the others. Though he tries to keep such thoughts from surfacing, he's scared. He's over his head in this mission; he thought he'd be gone for a month and then go home to share his adventures with his folks. But what has happened is unthinkable, and often he has the sensation that it's just a bad dream, that he will wake up in his bedroom at home, to the sound of his mother singing in the garden, and his father hammering copper plate for sculpture.

— Rick Berman, Michael Piller, Jeri Taylor, Harry Kim's description, Star Trek: Voyager Bible, 1995

The character went through more than one name prior to casting, with it being called Jay Osaka at one point. The series bible for Star Trek: Voyager described Kim as being a sheltered individual who had sought to repay the love of his parents through fulfilling their expectations for him at Starfleet Academy. Winrich Kolbe, the director of the Voyager pilot "Caretaker", was involved in the casting process and found Kim difficult as there was not a great number of young Asian actors to choose from. He said that the role was an "inexperienced, naive character", and that the actor cast as Kim would need to fight to stay in the forefront of episodes.

At the time of the casting, Garrett Wang had only been acting for about a year and a half, and after he was cast in the role he was described by Kolbe as a "young, up-and-coming actor, but he needs to learn, and that's going to take some time. He's one of the actors who has to really work hard on his craft in order to keep up with the others." The naivety of the character was emphasized in the media reports, with TV Guide describing the character prior to the launch of the series as "green-around-the-gills".

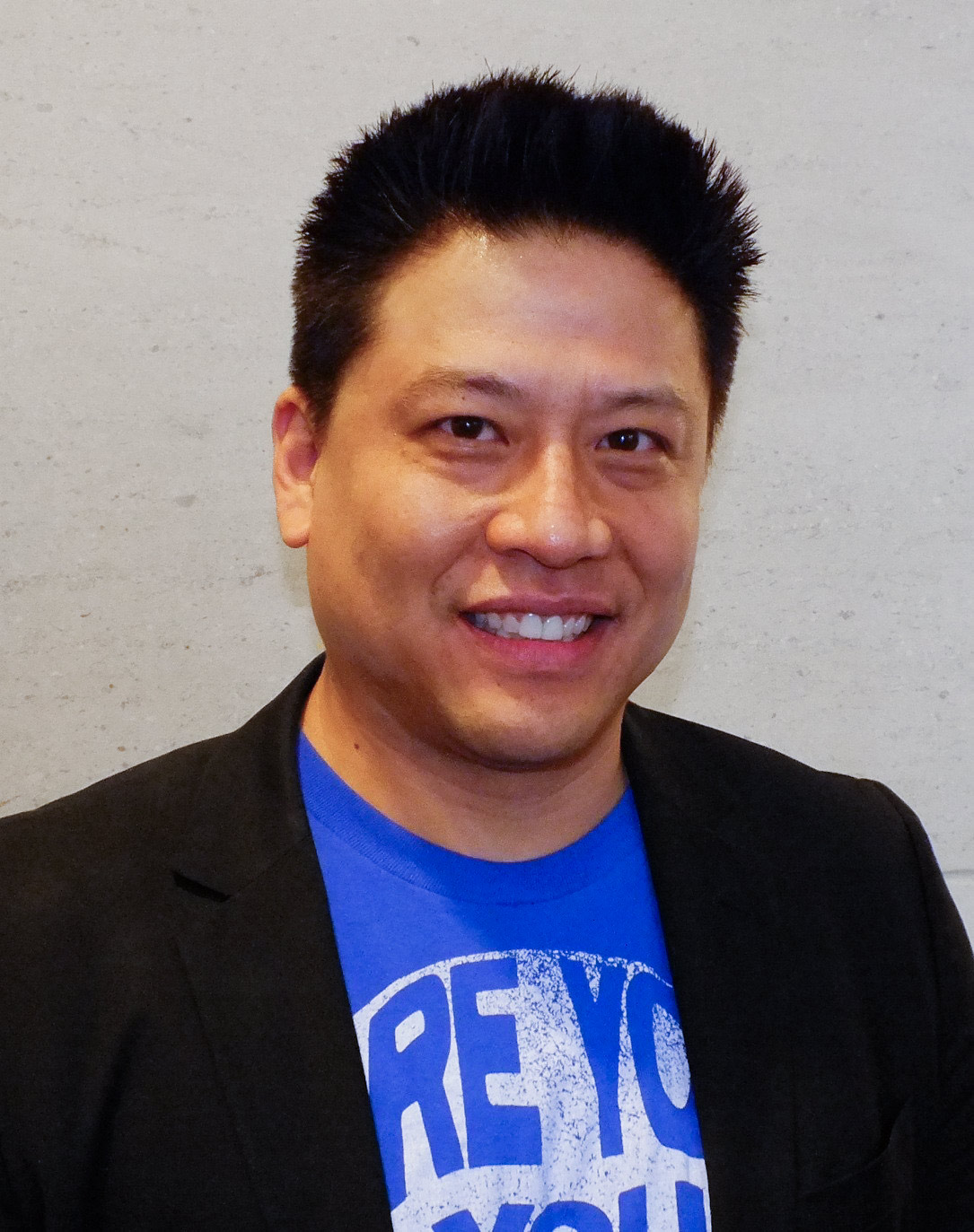
Garrett Wang was cast as Harry Kim, and appeared in all seven seasons of Voyager in that role.

Wang was enthusiastic about his new role, describing Kim's background by saying that "I had a stellar Starfleet Academy career and am basically the rookie on the bridge. I'm an Asian-American. There's the professional competence, but also the inner fear, 'Oh my God, are these britches too big for me?' His heritage is one of focus, of Zen and martial arts". Of the casting, he said that "My goal now is to do the best job possible playing Harry Kim and to begin repaying my parents for the unaccountable financial support they have given me throughout the years." The pilot of Voyager was broadcast on January 16, 1995.

Wang had initially gone along with the writing on the show until towards the end of the second season when he asked the production writers if he could have some action scenes and perhaps a romance. He had realised at the time that he was the only member of the main cast without a stunt double as he had never had an action scene that required one. This resulted in the Brannon Braga penned "Non Sequitur", to which Wang said to Rick Berman that there was not a need to give him all his requests in a single episode. Following that, he became more involved in suggestions for character direction, but the writers avoided giving Kim more of a comedic element similar to The Doctor (Robert Picardo) and Neelix (Ethan Phillips). Wang described himself as someone who tells jokes and makes impersonations on sets and was disappointed at not being able to utilise this nature.

By season five of Voyager, certain characters were seen by the production staff as being under-utilised, Kim amongst them. This led to episodes placing Kim, Chakotay and Tuvok in central positions, including the episode "Timeless" for the character of Kim. Wang was pleased with the episode, and felt that being able to act as the two different versions of Kim showed "a great dichotomy". Following the end of the show in 2001, Wang had felt that the character should have been promoted during the course of the series, but was told by producers that "someone's got to be the ensign".

== Appearances ==
Kim was born in 2349. After graduating from Starfleet Academy in 2370, his first assignment was as the Operations Officer aboard USS Voyager as seen in "Caretaker". Kim immediately became friends with Tom Paris (Robert Duncan McNeill) after he was assigned to the vessel for the mission which saw Voyager sent to track down a Maquis vessel in the Badlands. During this mission, the ship is sent some 70,000 light years into the Delta Quadrant, where Kim and B'Elanna Torres (Roxann Dawson) are abducted to an Ocampan medical facility. Both infected by an unknown ailment, they are rescued by and cured on Voyager on their escape from the underground city; they are cured on board. At the time of the stranding of the ship, Kim was engaged to be married, but Kim was encouraged to date other crew members by Paris.

In "Eye of the Needle", Kim found the ship's first contact back with the Alpha Quadrant when he discovered a micro-wormhole. It was discovered that it linked through to Romulan space some twenty years in the past. Kim twice travels through long-range transportation systems. In "Emanations", he is accidentally transported to the Vhnori homeworld by the effects of an alien burial system. He escapes the Vhnori and manages to go through the funeral system, terminating his life functions but returning him to Voyager in time to be revived. When the crew meet the Sikaris in "Prime Factors", Kim is the first crewman to be transported through their spatial trajector over a distance of some 40,000 light years. Ultimately the technology proves incompatible with Voyager's systems. On stardate 48693.2 (the episode "Heroes and Demons"), Kim is the first crewmember to be converted into energy by an alien creature appearing in a Beowulf holodeck programme. After the Doctor resolves the situation, Kim and two other crewmembers are restored.

Following a transporter accident, Kim awakes in San Francisco next to his fiancée, Libby (Jennifer Gatti) in the episode "Non Sequitur". He finds that he never travelled on board Voyager, and nor did Paris. After being contacted by an alien, he discovers that the transporter interacted with an alien "time-stream" and sent him into an alternative reality. After he receives assistance from Paris and the alien, he manages to restore the timeline and return to Voyager. During the episode "Persistence of Vision", Kim hallucinates Libby after Voyager attempts to enter Bothan space. On stardate 49548.7, Voyager enters a plasma cloud to avoid Vidiian vessels in "Deadlock". It is damaged, and Kim is sucked out through a hull breach into space and killed, while Naomi Wildman dies shortly after being born. The crew then find a duplicate Voyager in better condition occupying the same space but slightly out of phase. When the Vidiians attack the other Voyager, the alternative Kim is sent to the damaged version of the ship carrying the living Naomi Wildman shortly before the alternative Voyager self-destructs. This destroys the two Vidiian vessels, and the damaged version of Voyager continues on its way, carrying a different version of Kim and Wildman.

Whilst on shore leave on Akritiri, Kim and Paris are falsely accused of a terrorist bombing. They are imprisoned on a space station, while the Voyager crew track down the real offenders, who help them rescue their crewmen (episode "The Chute".) Whilst the crew are studying a nebula ("Alter Ego"), Kim and Tuvok both become romantically attached to a holodeck character; she is revealed to be controlled by an alien on a nearby space station. Kim becomes infected with Taresian DNA leading him to suspect that he may be a member of their species in "Favorite Son". But after discovering that it is all a ploy to extract his genetic material, he is saved by Voyager. In an alternative future seen in "Before and After", Tom Paris and Kes (Jennifer Lien) marry, and give birth to a daughter Linnis (Jessica Collins). Linnis and Kim marry, beget a child, Andrew Kim.

Kim becomes infected after being attacked by a member of Species 8472 whilst as a member of an away team aboard a Borg Cube in "Scorpion". He is cured by the Doctor after the hologram develops a process utilising Borg nano-probes. He is initially apprehensive working with the former Borg Seven of Nine (Jeri Ryan) but soon forms a new friendship. Following the events of "Demon", Kim is one of the first crewmembers to be duplicated by an alien entity on a class-Y planet. The duplicate crew are later killed after they leave the planet, and forget that they are duplicates. The duplicate version of Kim is the last captain of the ship, before deciding to drop out of warp by ejecting the warp core, destroying it. Kim develops a transwarp drive in "Timeless", which should allow Voyager to return to the Alpha Quadrant in hours. During the trip home, the ship is destroyed but Kim and Chakotay make it through on a shuttle. Years later, an older Kim and Chakotay find the destroyed Voyager and Kim manages to send a message back in time to Seven of Nine, averting the disaster and resetting the timeline.

Kim becomes infected with a bio-chemical bond after having sex with a Varro named Tal (Musetta Vander) in "The Disease" and chooses to go through the withdrawals without treatment. Alongside Tom Paris, Kim creates an Irish village holodeck program in "Fair Haven". This later causes problems when the holodeck characters begin to recognise changes made to the program and that the Starfleet crew are not from their "world". Kim is once again imprisoned by an alien race in "Body and Soul" when he is part of the crew on the Delta Flyer which is captured by the Lokirrim for transporting a hologram through their space. Whilst on another mission in the Delta Flyer in "Nightingale", Kim takes command of an Kraylor vessel, wanting to show that he can command after spending the past seven years as an Ensign on board Voyager. He manages to return the ship to its homeworld, evading an Annari fleet en route. In "Prophecy", Kim is sexually pursued by the Klingon Ch'Rega (Peggy Jo Jacobs); she later chooses Neelix instead. In the alternative future seen at the start of the series finale, "Endgame", Kim has been promoted to the rank of Captain aboard the USS Rhode Island. He attempts to convince Admiral Kathryn Janeway (Kate Mulgrew) out of her plan to travel back in time to help Voyager return home, but instead helps her when a Klingon vessel attacks her shuttle.

In Star Trek: Lower Decks season 5, a number of alternate reality Harry Kims serve aboard the Section 31 Defiant-class ship Anaximander, all of whom are interdimensional stowaways rescued by the ship. Only the last version of Kim has been promoted and is now a full Lieutenant while the rest of the Kims are still only ensigns, at least two of which were still stuck in the Delta Quadrant when they fell through an interdimensional rift. Dissatisfied with the path that his counterparts have taken and proving himself to mentally unstable, Lieutenant Kim kidnaps his counterparts and hijacks the interdimensional ship Beagle, attempting to return to his own reality. When the other Kims resist, Lieutenant Kim beams them back to the Anaximander, but he refuses to be reasoned with. Already badly damaged, the Beagle explodes once it enters the rift, killing Lieutenant Kim and destabilizing the rift, placing the entire multiverse in danger of destruction. The Anaximander pushes the energy wave to the prime universe in the hopes that Captain William Boimler's transporter duplicate and friends can find a solution in time to save their universe from destruction.

=== Voyager relaunch novels ===
A series of non-canon novels were launched in 2003 by Pocket Books set after the return of Voyager to the Alpha Quadrant. In these novels, Harry Kim is promoted to Lieutenant and assigned as Security Chief onboard Voyager under Captain Chakotay. In the Star Trek: Online spin-off novel The Needs of the Many, published in 2010, Harry Kim is the commanding officer of Starbase 11 in the year 2400.

== Reception ==
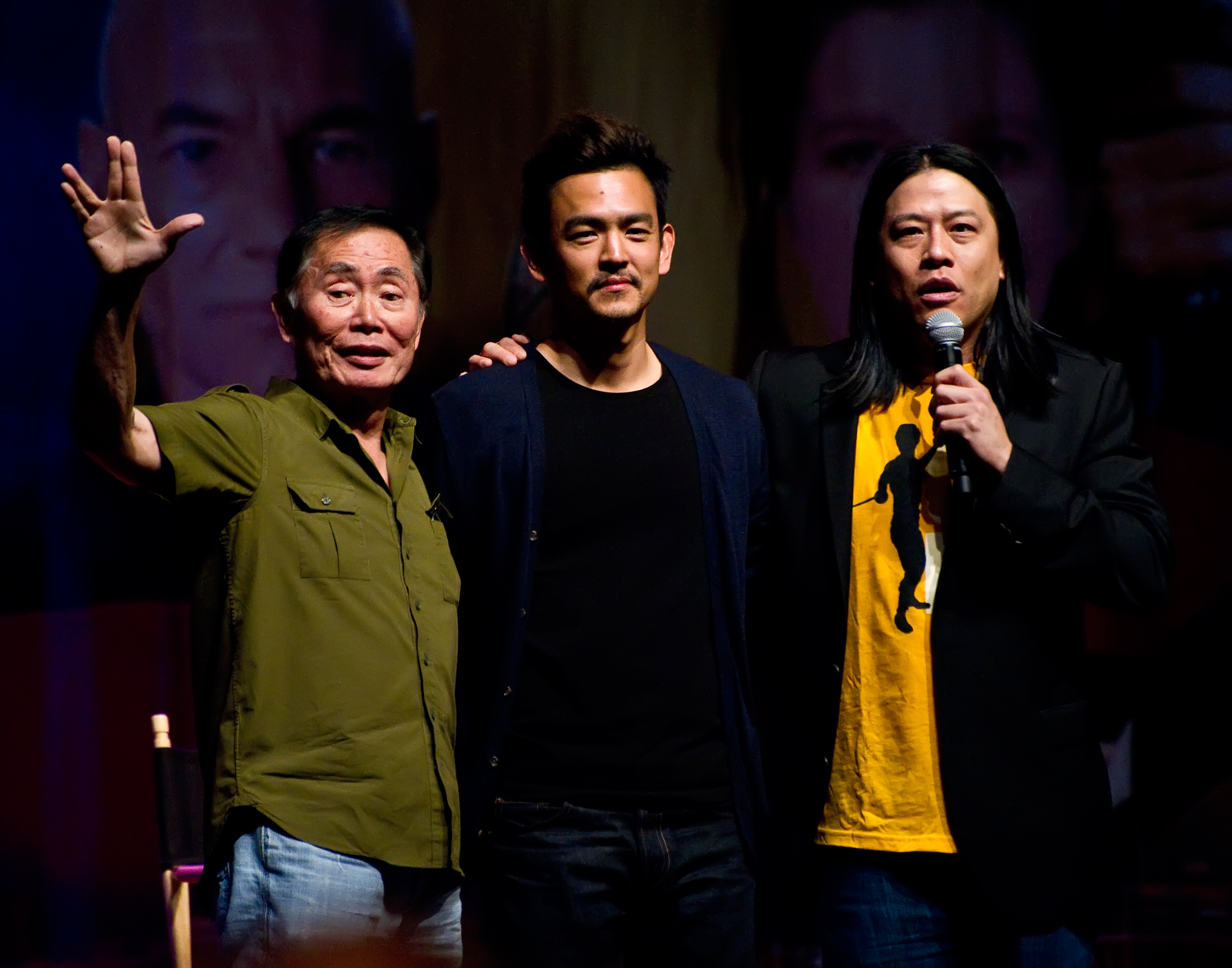
Garrett Wang, with George Takei and John Cho, two other Star Trek actors of Asian descent

The mothering nature of Janeway on Kim has been described by reviewers, with the crew forming a type of family network which has Kim as a surrogate son. His separation from his nuclear family at a young age is described as cruel, and Janeway, Chakotay and Tuvok are highlighted as his de facto parents in the series. This motherly position was described by Michelle Erica Green in her review of the episode "The Disease" for TrekNation, who described certain scenes as Kim needing to request permission from "Mommy" in order to have a relationship with an alien. She felt that the disease itself caused the character to grow a "backbone" as he had rarely asserted himself previously to the Captain.

Kim has been used to show the multiculturalism of Star Trek: Voyager. One scene, described by Elisabeth Anne Leonard, in the episode "Faces," featured a sweeping shot around the command table of Janeway, Chakotay, Tuvok, and Kim, showing a Caucasian race woman, a Native American, a man of Asian descent and a black Vulcan in a single shot. Kim's persistent optimism has been highlighted, with him being one of the few characters in the series who by the seventh series still believed that they would return home in their lifetime. Kim seemed to be frequently captured by alien species during the course of the series to the extent that it was described as one of the typical storylines seen in Voyager during an overview by The A.V. Club.

The authors of the book Deep Space and Sacred Time: Star Trek in the American Mythos state that the episode "Deadlock," which featured the death of Kim, was one of several examples in the Star Trek franchise where the death of a major character is reversed by a parallel existence. Other examples included in The Next Generation with the return of Tasha Yar in "Yesterday's Enterprise" and the death of Miles O'Brien in the Deep Space Nine episode "Visionary". They felt that Kim also shared another similarity with "Yesterday's Enterprise" in that in the episode "Non Sequitur", he feels that reality has been changed – which was similar to the experience that Guinan felt in The Next Generation episode. Kim's relationships included one with a character on the ship's holodeck in the episode "Alter Ego", but, after building a rivalry for the character's affections with Tuvok, he becomes disinterested after finding out that the character was being played by a real person. This relationship was highlighted as an example of how Star Trek describes the ideal woman as an "objectified embodiment of male desire with no inner self to complicate the so-called relationship that a man may have with her".

Juliette Harrisson for the website Den of Geek described "Timeless" as the best Harry Kim episode, and was the third best episode of Voyager overall. She said that "Wang’s bitter, emotionally scarred performance holds together an hour which also features some lovely imagery". Episodes centering on Kim were included in io9's list of the worst holodeck related episodes in Star Trek. These included "The Thaw", with the worst moment described as "the Harry Kim baby thing". Other episodes highlighted as bad included "Fair Haven" while it stated that it skipped the first season "Heroes and Demons". Wang later returned to Star Trek in fan-made productions and to the role of Harry Kim in Star Trek: Renegades, alongside Manu Intiraymi and Tim Russ from Voyager.

In 2017, Screen Rant ranked Harry the 11th most attractive person in the Star Trek universe. In 2018, CBR ranked Harry Kim the 24th best Starfleet character of Star Trek.
