= Seven of Nine =

Fictional character in Star Trek franchise

- Star Trek character
- Promotional image of Jeri Ryan as Seven of Nine in Star Trek: Voyager
- First appearance: "Scorpion, Part II" (1997) (Voyager)
- Portrayed by: Jeri Ryan; Katelin Petersen (child); Erica Bryan (child)

In-universe information
- Species: Human (at birth); Borg drone; Human with Borg enhancements (last seen)
- Affiliation: United Federation of Planets (at birth); Borg Collective; Starfleet; Fenris Rangers (Picard seasons 1-2)
- Family: Magnus Hansen (father); Erin Hansen (mother); Icheb (ward, "my child")
- Significant others: Axum; Chakotay; Rafaella "Raffi" Musiker (last seen)
- Postings: Raven (child on her parents' research vessel); 7 of 9 Tertiary Adjunct of Unimatrix 01; Astrometrics, USS Voyager; La Sirena; Acting commanding officer, USS Stargazer (NCC-82893); First officer, USS Titan (NCC-80102-A); Commanding officer, USS Enterprise (NCC-1701-G)

Seven of Nine (born Annika Hansen) is a fictional character introduced in the American science fiction television series Star Trek: Voyager. Portrayed by Jeri Ryan, she is a former Borg drone who joins the crew of the Federation starship Voyager. Her full Borg designation was Seven of Nine, Tertiary Adjunct of Unimatrix Zero One. While her birth name became known to her crewmates, after joining the Voyager crew she chose to continue to be called Seven of Nine, though she allowed "Seven" to be used informally.

Seven of Nine was introduced in the fourth-season premiere, "Scorpion, Part II". The character replaced Kes in the main cast, and was intended to introduce a foil to Captain Kathryn Janeway, similar to the role Spock performs for Captain Kirk in Star Trek: The Original Series. The character appeared through the final episode, "Endgame". Stories related to her relationship with Captain Janeway and with The Doctor appeared throughout the series; some episodes, such as "The Raven", explored her background and earlier life as Annika Hansen before she was assimilated by the Borg.

Seven of Nine, again played by Ryan, also appears in the series Star Trek: Picard as a recurring character in the first season before being promoted to series regular for the second and third seasons.

== Casting and filming ==
Following the third season of Star Trek: Voyager, the production team decided that the main cast character of Kes was to be dropped from the show. It was decided that Captain Kathryn Janeway needed a contrasting character, and so Seven of Nine was developed to fill this role. It had been a previous Star Trek staple to have a character that could provide a third-person view on the human condition, prior examples including Spock in Star Trek: The Original Series, Data in Star Trek: The Next Generation and Odo in Star Trek: Deep Space Nine. In addition, the producers of Voyager had been keen to make greater use of The Borg as recurring antagonists in the show, particularly after the success of the 1996 Next Generation feature film Star Trek: First Contact.

After being cast, actress Jeri Ryan acknowledged she had hardly even seen Star Trek, and had no idea what the Borg were. To prepare her, the producers gave her a copy of Star Trek: First Contact and the Star Trek Encyclopedia the day before she was due to test for the part. She was specifically told not to base her performance on the Borg Queen from the film as she was a "completely different animal and [they] were creating something entirely new". Her acting experience up until this point had consisted of television movies, guest appearances and Dark Skies.

Her audition process consisted of two readings for the producers before Ryan was asked to come in to talk through the part with the executive producers, Jeri Taylor, Rick Berman and Brannon Braga. Following this, she tested for the network and was told that her option had been picked up. She remarked about her experience of joining the Voyager team: "It was a little awkward since the cast had been together for three years already. And one of the original characters was being written out pretty much at the same time I was being added. But the cast was terrific, and very welcoming." Although she wore extensive make-up for her first appearances, including an eye-piece that fell off when she smiled, her typical make-up regimen took around 45 minutes, with the attachment of the Borg appliance above her eye taking an additional 15 minutes. Her hairstyling usually took as long as that combined.

In the following years, the Voyager writers wrote several plot lines revolving around Seven's exploration of the positive and negative sides of human individuality. The cyborg nature of the character is seen as representing a challenge to "simple conceptions of connections/disconnections between bodies." Ryan maintained that the main topic about Seven was "humanity" and stated that her character was pivotal to the success of the show, because she "brought conflict to the show, which it was sadly lacking. … The Voyager crew was just one big happy family." After the addition of the former Borg drone to the starship's crew at the start of the fourth season of Voyager, the shows' weekly viewer ratings increased by more than 60%. Ryan's arrival on the show was accompanied by a massive publicity campaign in TV magazines and newspaper supplements. Ryan thought that the increase may have been because of the way the character looked, but maintained that those viewers would have been retained by the writing on the show.

She also remarked that "combining non-human qualities with an attractive human appearance," as in Seven's character, was a great move by the producers. She felt that the writers did a good job in not pushing the character to be more human and having Seven enter into relationships on the show. Ryan was concerned that it could have turned out to be "Seven's sexual escapades on Voyager". In terms of portrayal, she said that "keeping a straight face" while showing suppressed emotion was an enjoyable challenge. Regarding her form-fitting one-piece costume, Ryan commented that it was extremely impractical and uncomfortable, but worth the reward of portraying a character like Seven.

Although Seven was originally introduced as a foil for Captain Janeway, with the two of them proving to be very adversarial, they gained mutual respect as time went by. Ryan later described this as a mother-daughter relationship on the show, although she said that the writers had managed to make the character into more of an unruly teenager. The inclusion of Seven of Nine as a primary character for the show alongside Janeway and the Doctor was criticised by other actors. Robert Beltran, who played Chakotay, felt that his character, along with Harry Kim, Tuvok and Neelix, were being overlooked. As the end of the series approached, Ryan remarked that she would "love to do something without special effects or rubber glued to my face, it'd be a nice change of pace."

Following the end of Voyager, Ryan joined the main cast of Boston Public, comparing her new character of Ronnie with Seven of Nine, saying "[Seven] had all of these emotions, she just wasn't comfortable expressing them, and didn't really know how to express them; Ronnie, my character on Boston Public, is quite comfortable expressing them, and is fairly free with her expressions, I think. So it's going to be a lot of fun. It's going to be much more free, as far as the acting style." Ryan said that she had several favourite Seven of Nine episodes, including "The Gift", "The Raven", "Revulsion", "Hunters", "Prey" and the two-part "The Killing Game".

=== Attire and filming issues ===
In her first two episodes, "Scorpion" and "The Gift", Seven of Nine was costumed as a full Borg. This outfit took some two-and-a-half hours for Ryan to get into, but an error was made in measuring the outfit by not taking into account the prosthetics that she was required to wear for the part. This cut off the blood supply through her carotid artery, causing her to pass out on two occasions. After a nurse was called twice to supply oxygen, the costume was modified to prevent this from happening again.

Once the character had the majority of the Borg implants removed, a new costume was required. Ryan wore a silver jumpsuit for the first few episodes, which director Jesús Salvador Treviño said that during the filming of the episode "Day of Honor" caused problems as "almost any camera angle inevitably winds up emphasising her sexuality." Ryan described the new costume as "a little snug", and wore a corset-like item which gave the appearance of mechanical ribs. At least one version of the costume had the corset built into it. In order to give her greater height, the shoes which formed part of her costume had four-inch (10 cm) high heels. She said in a 2012 interview that the suit by costume designer Robert Blackman was a "feat of engineering", but required a 20-minute production shutdown if she needed to use the toilet, as she needed that time plus assistance to get into and out of it. She said that it was so fitted and figure hugging that it "might as well have been body paint". The lengthy time it took to use the bathroom led to the actress not drinking any fluids, which in turn made her feel sick.

Treviño praised the subsequent changes to her costume in order to reduce its sexuality, saying that "it is much more sensible, because she's still an attractive person but then you get away from that titillation stuff which I think is so demeaning not only to the audience, but it's kinda of demeaning to what Star Trek is about." The later versions of her costumes still required 20 minutes to get into before filming could start, but Ryan said they were much more forgiving, "In the silver costume, if I got goosebumps, you could see them. The brown costume is a thicker, stronger fabric. It's not quite so clingy, so the waist doesn't have to be cinched in." That version of the costume also removed the vertical bones of the corset, which allowed Ryan to have greater flexibility while wearing it.

One of the major remaining pieces of Borg technology that Ryan continued to wear for the part was what she described as "[t]hat little thing over my eye". This was because the term that referred to it in the episodes would change depending on the writers and the episode itself, she explained that "Sometimes, it's my cortical implant. Sometimes, it's my cranial implant. Sometimes, it's my ocular implant."

== Appearances ==
Seven of Nine appeared on Star Trek: Voyager between 1997 and 2001, and between 2020 and 2023 on Star Trek: Picard.

=== Background ===
Seven of Nine's backstory was explained during the course of Star Trek: Voyager. She was born on the Tendara Colony on Stardate 25479 to Magnus and Erin Hansen, and was named Annika. At the age of four, her parents were given use of the research vessel USS Raven by Starfleet to help them investigate the presence of an unknown species in deep space. This trip lasted for three years during which time they encountered the Borg and, using a transwarp conduit, followed a cube to the Delta Quadrant. Annika's father developed technology to allow the ship to remain undetected by the aliens, and even to allow them to board the Borg vessel; but after an ion storm struck the vessel, the Borg detected the family and assimilated them.

Annika was placed into a Borg maturation chamber for the next few years, during which time she joined the collective. Following this, she was a Borg drone and assimilated individuals from a number of species, including a crew member from the USS Melbourne at the Battle of Wolf 359 on Stardate 43989.1. Two years later, Seven of Nine, along with three other drones, crashed on a planet and they were separated from the Borg Collective. This caused their individualities to resurface over time, which caused Seven to panic due to her relative inexperience with individuality; she forcibly took control of the other drones in a temporary hive mind until the Borg found them.

=== Star Trek: Voyager ===
==== Joining the crew in "Scorpion" ====
Seven of Nine first appears in the second part of "Scorpion" at the start of the fourth season. She is chosen by the Borg to communicate verbally with Captain Janeway so that together they can develop a weapon to defeat Species 8472. After a Borg cube destroys itself to save Voyager, Seven is transported aboard the Federation ship. Janeway is injured, leaving Chakotay in command—but he distrusts Seven and the Borg and after he refuses to work with her, she sends the vessel into fluidic space to force them to develop the weapon. Just before doing so, Chakotay decompresses the cargo bay, killing the remaining Borg with the exception of Seven. Janeway recovers and works with Seven and the Doctor to develop the weapon and defeat an attack by Species 8472. With their alliance ended, Seven attempts to assimilate the crew but they override her neural connection to the Collective. Over the course of the following episode, "The Gift", The Doctor removes about 70% of Seven's Borg implants because her body begins to reject the technology once her connection to the Borg Collective is severed. Seven leaves sick bay to help repair the ship, and while working she attempts to communicate with the Collective but is stopped by Kes. She is placed in the brig where she and Captain Janeway have a heart-to-heart discussion. Following the departure of Kes, Seven (now restored by The Doctor to her original human appearance) is recruited to join Voyager's crew.

Seven immediately comes into conflict with Chief Engineer B'Elanna Torres in "Day of Honor" and puts Voyager in danger when the Caatati steal the warp drive and hold it hostage for supplies and Seven herself. Instead, she builds a thorium generator to power their vessel, which the Caatati accept in exchange for the core and for allowing the rescue of Torres and Lt. Tom Paris. In "The Raven", Seven, experiencing visions of the Borg and a raven, steals a shuttle and heads into nearby B'omar space. The aliens would not allow Voyager to enter their space, but Tuvok and Paris cross the border in another shuttle and head in pursuit. Tuvok beams across to Seven's shuttle, where she explains she's following a homing beacon. They head to a planet where the wreckage of the USS Raven is crashed on the surface. They transport down and Seven recognises it as her parents' vessel. The B'omar attack but Voyager comes to their aid and the crew depart. Janeway tells Seven that her parents' research records are in the ship's databanks; Seven replies that she might read them someday.

After some time, Seven begins to question why Captain Janeway continues to make contact with alien species as they travel back to Earth, as it often results in incidents. Janeway explains that Voyager's purpose is exploration and will continue that mission despite any problems that might occur. While working in astrometrics, Seven detects an ancient alien communications platform which connects all the way back to the borders of Federation space. This results in the first successful communication with Starfleet since Voyager was stranded in the Delta Quadrant, although it does also result in angering an alien race upon first contact; the Hirogen had claimed the platform for their own. The crew subsequently receive messages from home through the array, but the ship is once again threatened by the Hirogen. Tuvok and Seven transport aboard the array to speed the downloading of the messages, but are captured and tortured by the aliens. They are rescued by Voyager, but the communications array is destroyed. When the crew find a member of Species 8472 being hunted by the Hirogen, Seven is reluctant to help her former enemy as it would put the ship at risk of destruction from the Hirogen. When the Hirogen threaten Voyager, Seven disobeys Janeway's command and transports the alien aboard a Hirogen ship. In response, the Captain punishes her by restricting her computer access and confines her to the cargo bay where her Borg regeneration unit is set up.

In "Retrospect", the Doctor accidentally causes Seven to relive repressed memories of while she was Borg. She confers these memories onto an alien she had just met, and the local authorities seek his arrest. The crew realise what has happened, but he is killed before he can be told he is innocent. During the events of "The Killing Game" where the Hirogen take over Voyager and place the crew in the holodeck for hunting practice, Seven is brainwashed into thinking she was a French club singer during the Nazi occupation of France. She is the first member of the crew who has her memories restored by the Doctor, and helps Janeway bring about a truce with the Hirogen. Janeway and Seven disagree once more in "The Omega Directive" about what to do when the ship detects unstable Omega particles nearby. The Captain wants to destroy them under Starfleet standing orders, while Seven seeks to harness them as the Borg consider the particles to be near perfection. Seven must later deal with a series of hallucinations and loneliness while helping the crew cross a radiation-filled nebula in "One". This experience results in her seeking out the company of other crew members more frequently. Her suspicions of Arturis prove correct in "Hope and Fear" when it is revealed that he was seeking revenge on the Voyager crew for their previous alliance with the Borg by creating a fake USS Dauntless and attempting to take them back to Borg space where they would be assimilated.

==== Relationships ====
A few episodes touch on Seven's romantic life, which is limited due to the effect on her emotions of having been part of the Borg. At one point she propositions Harry Kim, but he turns her down. Later on, with the Doctor's assistance, she tries dating other crew unsuccessfully, while later exploring intimate relationships with a hologram of Chakotay. Finally, in "Endgame" she is involved in a romantic relationship with Chakotay which includes at least three dates and a first kiss. In one alternate timeline, they married before her death, and, in another, she is killed along with the rest of the Voyager crew ("Timeless").

Seven has her first experience of motherhood to some degree when, in the episode "Drone", a transporter accident combines her nanoprobes with the Doctor's holoemitter. This results in the creation of One, a Borg with 29th-century technology, whom Seven helps adjust to life on board Voyager. One sacrifices his life to destroy a Borg sphere and protect the vessel, dying in front of an emotional Seven. In the alternative future shown in "Timeless", Seven of Nine and the vast majority of the Voyager crew are dead. Using a Borg temporal transmitter, Chakotay and Harry Kim manage to send information back in time to Seven to prevent the destruction of the ship. A little more of Seven's Borg history is revealed when, due to a modified Borg device planted by an alien species, she begins to exhibit the memories of some of the people she has assimilated. After B'Elanna Torres disables the device, Seven returns to normal.

While investigating a damaged Borg sphere in "Dark Frontier", Seven hears the voice of the collective once more and refuses to return to Voyager. Instead, she is taken back to Borg space where she meets with the Borg Queen, who reveals that Seven's establishment as an individual was all part of a plan to use her memories to allow the Borg to assimilate humanity. The Queen first has Seven assist in the assimilation of a new species, and after some disobedience, has her work on nanoprobes designed to assimilate humans. Seven discovers that her father is assimilated and kept as one of the Queen's personal drones. Meanwhile, Voyager is working on a plan to rescue her, and using the Delta Flyer, approach the vessel close enough that Captain Janeway can transport aboard. Seven and Janeway work together to escape the Queen, and steal technology that reduces their distance to Earth by 15 years. She later attempts to develop her experience of romance, working with the Doctor in the episode "Someone to Watch Over Me".

She becomes involved in a time-travel plot once more when Captain Braxton of the Federation timeship USS "Relativity" pulls her out of the timestream to help prevent the destruction of Voyager. The travel has effects on her body, and she dies, resulting in an earlier version being pulled out of time. During the investigation, it transpires that it was Braxton himself who planted a bomb on the ship and together with the crew of the Relativity, Captain Janeway manages to apprehend Braxton before he plants the device. Seven encounters three former Borg with which she previously formed a mini-collective after their scout vessel crashed on a planet; where the other three were assimilated as adults, Seven's childhood assimilation left her panicking at being separated from the Collective and facing an individuality she did not know how to cope with on her own. She forced this collective on them because they were becoming individuals, which has caused the trio to keep a mental connection even after their eventual disconnection from the rest of the Borg. During the course of "Survival Instinct", the link is terminated, causing each of the former Borg to be predicted to die within a month.

=== Star Trek: Picard ===
Seven of Nine appeared as a recurring character in the first season of Star Trek: Picard, and as a main cast member in the second season. In Picard, set more than twenty years after the finale of Voyager, Seven is a member of the Fenris Rangers, a peacekeeping organization active near the former Romulan Neutral Zone. Ryan notes her portrayal is "much more human" and developed a new speaking cadence to reflect the character's two decades living in Federation space.

In 2386, nine years after the USS Voyager returned to Earth, Seven's surrogate son Icheb was abducted by Borg harvesters. Seven attempted to rescue him but arrived too late, finding him mortally wounded. Icheb died in Seven's arms after she acceded to his request to mercy kill him.

In 2399, Seven encounters Jean-Luc Picard and the crew of La Sirena en route to the planet Freecloud. Seven assists Picard in his attempt to rescue Dr. Bruce Maddox from Bjayzl, a criminal businesswoman, by offering herself as bounty. It is revealed that Seven's true intentions are to kill Bjayzl, who was responsible for Icheb's death. Picard believes he is able to talk Seven out of killing Bjayzl, and they return to La Sirena with Maddox. She and Picard discuss their mutual difficulty regaining their humanity after being assimilated by the Borg, and she disembarks under the pretense of rejoining the Rangers, but actually transports back to the surface and vaporizes Bjayzl.

Seven arrives at the Artifact, a disabled Borg cube captured by the Romulans, after being summoned by Picard's companion Elnor. To save the former Borg onboard from execution at the hands of the Romulans, she temporarily connects herself to the cube inside the queencell, taking on the role of a Borg Queen. She does this despite concern about keeping control:

Seven of Nine: "Assimilate them? Invade their minds? Suppress their identities, enslave them? Again?"
Elnor: "You can release them when we win."
Seven of Nine: "They won't want to be released. And I... I might not want to release them."

Despite her concerns, Seven is able to disconnect herself after the Romulan forces have been driven off the cube, stating that "Annika" still has work to do. She brings the cube to Soji's homeworld, Coppelius, to aid Picard, but it crashes on the surface after being disabled by the planetary defenses. When the Romulan armada arrives at the planet to destroy the synthetics, the Romulan agent Narissa attempts to access the cube's weapons to destroy La Sirena, but is pushed off a ledge by Seven. After the Romulan armada is warded off, Seven joins the crew of La Sirena and is seen holding hands with Picard's companion Raffi.

Seven returns in the second season, where she is the captain of La Sirena after Rios had returned to Starfleet, and she is in a relationship with Raffi. When Q sends her and others back in a changed timeline, where she was never assimilated and is President Annika Hansen of the Earth-based Confederation of Earth, she joins the La Sirena crew in a time travel journey back to 2024 to prevent Q from creating the alternate timeline and enjoys being Borg-free for the first time since she was six. Seven and Raffi try to find the mysterious Watcher and end up rescuing Rios from ICE officers after being involved in a car chase. She later helps protect and watch over Renée Picard, who is the focus of Q's machinations. She and Raffi then search for Jurati and find that she is slowly becoming a new Borg Queen. In a fight between Borg soldiers, former mercenaries, Adam Soong and the Jurati/Borg Queen entity, she is partially reassimilated to save her life, after Jurati is able to remind the Borg Queen of her affection for Seven. It is also revealed that after Voyager returned to Earth, Seven tried to formally join Starfleet, but was rejected because of her Borg implants. Admiral Janeway threatened to resign from Starfleet over the matter, but Seven dropped her request and joined the Fenris Rangers instead. In the season finale, when they are sent back to their own timeline, Picard gives Seven a field commission, and she takes command of the USS Stargazer.

In the third season, Seven, with Picard and Janeway's encouragement, has remained a Starfleet officer with the rank of commander. She is assigned as first officer of the USS Titan-A, the successor to the ship that William Riker commanded for many years. The transition has not been smooth, as her captain, Liam Shaw, does not trust her due to her Borg past and insists that she use her human name. In the final episode of Star Trek: Picard, Tuvok promotes Seven of Nine to the rank of captain, revealing that Shaw had given her a glowing recommendation for command in spite of the friction between them. Seven is given command of the USS Enterprise (NCC-1701-G), with Commander Raffi Musiker as her first officer and Ensign Jack Crusher II as her counselor. She is last seen about to give her first command as captain of the Enterprise.

=== Novels, comics and video games ===
Following the switch of the Star Trek comic properties to WildStorm, the first comic to be released was Star Trek: Voyager - False Colors. This featured Seven of Nine in a prominent role, as the crew investigate what appears to be a Borg vessel.

Seven of Nine has made appearances in the Star Trek comics, such as in IDW Publishing's Star Trek: The Next Generation – Hive. She has also continued to be a main character in the Voyager novel relaunch.

Some of the novels that prominently feature Seven of Nine include Seven of Nine by Christie Golden, No Time Like the Past by Greg Cox, Shadow by Dean Wesley Smith, The Nanotech War by Steven Piziks, The Farther Shore by Christie Golden, and Before Dishonor by Peter David. There is also a script book featuring six television episodes called Becoming Human: The Seven of Nine Saga.

The first video game that the character of Seven of Nine appeared in was Star Trek: Voyager – Elite Force. Despite the rest of the main cast voicing their characters, Jeri Ryan did not voice Seven. Instead, the character was voiced by Joan Buddenhagen, with Ryan's voice pack added alongside an expansion to the game. It was also made available as a free download for those that did not purchase the expansion pack. Jeri Ryan has also voiced the character in the Delta Rising expansion to Star Trek Online, a massively multiplayer online role-playing game (MMORPG). The game is set beyond the end of the original Voyager series, with the storyline placing Seven on board the USS Callisto as a science advisor to the Federation fleet which is returning to the Delta Quadrant. When asked about returning as Seven for the game at the Destination Star Trek 3 convention in London, England, Ryan said that "It was fun, surprisingly fun, she fit like an old pair of slippers."

== Reception ==
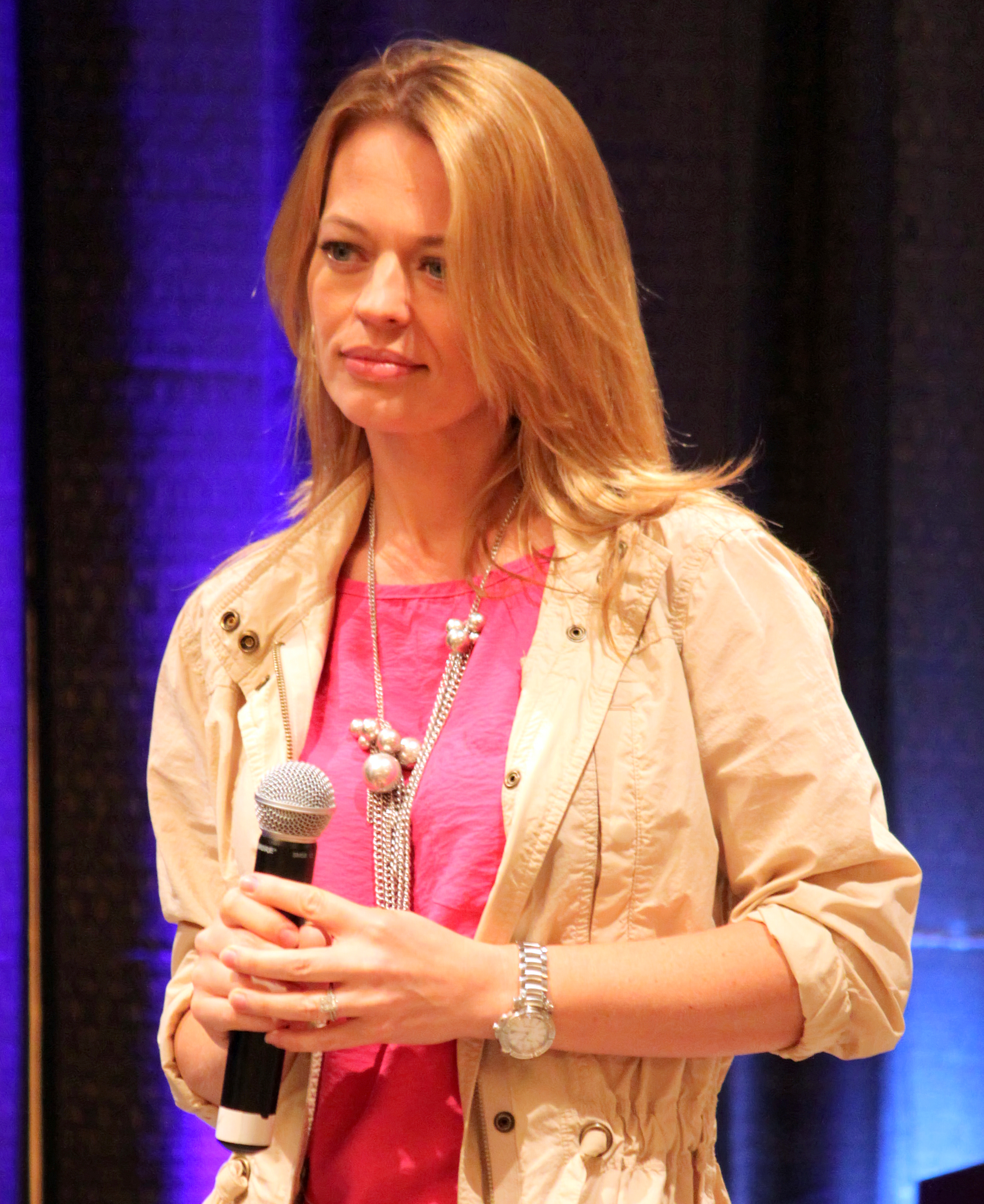
Jeri Ryan, appearing at the Creation Star Trek convention in 2010

The initial fan reaction was mixed with some accusing the show of adding her to attract more 18–35 male audience members, which was denied by Braga. The character's attire, numerous form-fitting catsuits with distinct rib-lines and a high stiff neck, was criticized by veteran Star Trek writer/producer Ronald D. Moore, who felt she should have a more Borg-like appearance. Her outfit also annoyed some who felt that it was an attempt by the show's creators to make her sexually appealing to some viewers, without any storyline purposes intended. Keith DeCandido of Tor.com was critical of the hair and costume which "for reasons that have absolutely nothing to do with the character and everything to do with external factors" but that Ryan's performance manages to elevate matters, and give Seven a compelling journey. Ryan was surprised at the immediate fan reaction on the Internet, as there was a full website devoted to her, created only six days after her casting.

Ziauddin Sardar said in the New Statesman that her appearance on Voyager "restored the warp drive" to the show, resulting in a "triumphant note" to the start of the following season. Meanwhile, Ian Spelling writing in Starlog magazine in 1998 said that the introduction of Seven was "just the kick in the asteroid that Voyager needed."

Rob Owen at the Chicago Sun-Times said that the majority of the Voyager cast were "lacking in depth" with the exception of Seven, the Doctor and Captain Janeway. By the end of the series, Seven was described as the "most bewitching cast member" and the "first authentic Trek bombshell since Uhura" by Frank Ahrens at The Washington Post.

In 2009, IGN ranked Seven of Nine as the 12th-best character of Star Trek overall. In 2012, Paste rated Seven of Nine as the fifth-best character of all Star Trek. In 2016, Screen Rant rated Seven of Nine as the tenth-best character in Star Trek overall. They highlight the character's slow recovery after being victimized by the Borg. In 2018, CBR ranked Jeri Ryan, who plays Seven of Nine, as the 14th best actor of the Star Trek franchise.
Askmen.com ranked Seven of Nine as the fourth-most-attractive woman of the science fiction genre, including film and television. In 2011, Seven of Nine was ranked the second-top-sexiest woman of science fiction television. In 2017, Screen Rant ranked Seven of Nine the fourth-most-attractive person in the Star Trek universe. CBR ranked Seven of Nine the "15th-fiercest" female character of the Star Trek universe. In 2019, Seven of Nine was ranked the fourth-sexiest Star Trek character by SyFy.

=== Themes ===
The initial episodes following the introduction of Seven of Nine showed Captain Janeway mirroring the actions of the Borg as she turned down Seven's request to be returned to the collective. Abducting Seven was also suggested to be a "tough-love" scenario with Janeway taking the place of Seven's mother, while the Doctor posed as her father. It was this new family relationship that later caused the Borg Queen to modify her tactics to re-assimilate Seven in the episode "Dark Frontier", by simulating a mother-daughter relationship. The Doctor, Seven and Janeway relationship was also compared to Pygmalion showing Galatea to Venus in the way that the Doctor re-humanised Seven during the events of "The Gift".

Seven was received as one of the Voyager characters who filled a Spock-like role, alongside Tuvok, with her "blonde bombshell" appearance balanced by "intelligence, boldness, rationality and a remarkable lack of interest in the opposite sex".

The sexuality of the character was also questioned following her introduction. The character built up a fanbase among the LGBTQ community which resulted in an online petition to have her revealed as a lesbian. It was pointed out in The Scotsman that the series attempted to avoid any "lesbian subtext" between Seven and Janeway because it was intended to be seen as "family-friendly". The truth is that there was no romantic relationship between Seven and Janeway. The approach by Harry Kim at one point, to which she suggested that he should disrobe in order to "copulate", was suggested to be because of her curiosity about human mating practices rather than any traditional sense of attraction. Seven had romantic ties to First Officer Chakotay, and in the final episodes of the series they fell in love. When the character returned in the series Star Trek: Picard she was portrayed in a same-sex relationship.

The introduction of Seven on the series had subsequent effects on the series Star Trek: Enterprise, as T'Pol (played by Jolene Blalock) was based on a combination of the Seven character and Leonard Nimoy's original Spock.

The efforts of Seven to return to normal living have been compared by many writers to the deprogramming of former cult members.

=== Award and nominations ===
Jeri Ryan was nominated on five occasions at the Saturn Awards for portraying Seven of Nine, winning in 2001 and 2024 for Best Supporting Actress on Television. She has also won the Satellite Award for Best Actress – Television Series Drama in 1999.

Year	Association	Category	Series	Result
1998	Saturn Awards	Best Actress on Television	Star Trek: Voyager	Nominated
1999	Satellite Awards	Best Actress – Television Series Drama	Star Trek: Voyager	Won
1999	Saturn Awards	Best Actress on Television	Star Trek: Voyager	Nominated
2000	Saturn Awards	Best Supporting Actress on Television	Star Trek: Voyager	Nominated
2001	Saturn Awards	Best Supporting Actress on Television	Star Trek: Voyager	Won
2021	Saturn Awards	Best Guest Starring Role on Television	Star Trek: Picard	Nominated
2024	Astra TV Awards	Best Supporting Actress in a Streaming Drama Series	Star Trek: Picard	Won
2024	Saturn Awards	Best Supporting Actress on Television	Star Trek: Picard	Won
2024	Critics' Choice Super Awards	Best Actress in a Science Fiction/Fantasy Series	Star Trek: Picard	Nominated

== See also ==
- List of female action heroes and villains
