= List of DuckTales (2017 TV series) episodes =

DuckTales is an American animated television series developed by Matt Youngberg and Francisco Angones for Disney Television Animation. It premiered as a sneak preview on Disney XD on August 12, 2017, and regularly on September 23, later moving to Disney Channel on May 4, 2018. A reboot of the eponymous 1987 television series, the show centers around the continuing adventures of trillionaire and adventurer Scrooge McDuck (David Tennant), and his three troublesome, yet caring triplet nephews, Huey, Dewey, and Louie (Danny Pudi, Ben Schwartz, and Bobby Moynihan). They are accompanied by their short-tempered uncle and Scrooge's nephew Donald Duck (Tony Anselmo), their excitable friend Webby Vanderquack (Kate Micucci), her protective grandmother Mrs. Beakley (Toks Olagundoye), and accident-prone pilot Launchpad McQuack (Beck Bennett). In season two, the family is reunited with the triplets’ mother and Donald's twin sister Della Duck (Paget Brewster).

The show was renewed for a third season on September 21, 2018, which premiered on April 4, 2020. The third and final season of the show concluded on March 15, 2021.

Over the course of the series, 75 half-hours of DuckTales were produced (25 per season), comprising 64 regular episodes, 4 double-length specials, and 1 triple-length special.

== Series overview ==
Season	Episodes		Originally released		
Season	Episodes		First released	Last released	Network
1	23	9	August 12, 2017	December 2, 2017	Disney XD
1	23	14	May 4, 2018	August 18, 2018	Disney Channel
2	24		October 20, 2018	September 12, 2019	Disney Channel
3	22		April 4, 2020	March 15, 2021	Disney XD

== Episodes ==
=== Season 1 (2017–18) ===
Note : Episodes in this season are presented based on the official order of the season as stated by co-developer Francisco Angones and listed on Disney+. This may not reflect the order in which they initially aired or their production number.

No. overall	No. in season	Title	Directed by	Written by	Original release date	Prod. code	U.S. viewers (millions)
1	1	"Woo-oo!" (Note: This episode is a one-hour special. When aired as two half-hour episodes, the second half is re-titled "Escape To/From Atlantis!".)	John Aoshima & Dana Terrace	Story by : Francisco Angones, Madison Bateman, Colleen Evanson, Nate Federman, ND Stevenson & Matt Youngberg; Teleplay by : Francisco Angones; Storyboarded by : David Baker, Emmy Cicierega, Ben Holm, Matthew Humphreys, Tanner Johnson & Jason Reicher	August 12, 2017	101–102	0.28 (Note: This is the total viewers number only for the first hour of the event (12:00 AM to 1:00 AM). The entire 24-hour premiere event reached 5.4 million total viewers.)
Donald Duck reluctantly leaves his triplet nephews, Huey, Dewey, and Louie, with his estranged uncle Scrooge McDuck while he goes to a job interview. After Scrooge locks the triplets in a room for making fun of him, they come across Webby Vanderquack, who befriends them and shows off a collection of relics that Scrooge and Donald collected while adventuring, only to accidentally release various ancient evils housed in them. After the kids help him contain them, Scrooge finds his thirst for adventure rekindled and decides to take them all, along with his driver and pilot Launchpad McQuack, to find the Lost Jewel of Atlantis. However, the group are unaware that Scrooge's rival, Flintheart Glomgold, seeks the jewel too and has hired Donald as his sailor, leading to a race against time to claim the relic. During their quest, Dewey confronts Scrooge about locking him and his brothers up and not wanting them around, though they later reconcile. In the end, Scrooge gets the Jewel and Donald and the triplets move into McDuck Manor after an accident costs them their houseboat. Revisiting Scrooge's collection, Dewey discovers a painting of Scrooge, Donald, and the triplets' long-lost mother and Donald's twin sister, Della.
2	2	"Daytrip of Doom!"	Dana Terrace	Story by : Francisco Angones, Madison Bateman, Colleen Evanson, Christian Magalhaes, Bob Snow, Rachel Vine & Matt Youngberg; Teleplay by : Rachel Vine; Storyboarded by : Emmy Cicierega, Ben Holm & Jason Reicher	September 23, 2017	103	0.34
The boys take Webby to Funso's Fun Zone. However, since she has lived in McDuck Manor for most of her life, she has trouble having fun and accidentally gets the boys in trouble. Even worse, they get captured by the Beagle Boys in an attempt to ransom them off to Scrooge, much to the disapproval of Ma Beagle. Meanwhile, Donald butts heads with Scrooge's housekeeper and Webby's grandmother Mrs. Beakley. After they receive the Beagles' ransom note, they work together to rescue the kids. When they get to Funso's, however, they find that Webby and the boys were able to save themselves.
3	3	"The Impossible Summit of Mt. Neverrest!"	Tom Owens & Matt Youngberg	Story by : Francisco Angones, Madison Bateman, Colleen Evanson, Christian Magalhaes, Bob Snow, ND Stevenson & Matt Youngberg; Teleplay by : Angones & Stevenson; Storyboarded by : Mark Garcia, Dalton E. Grant Jr., Kalvin Lee & Calvin Suggs	December 2, 2017	104	0.40
Scrooge, the boys, Webby, and Launchpad spend their Christmas attempting to climb the "unclimbable" Mt. Neverrest, a task Scrooge failed at 75 years ago due to his treacherous guide, George Mallardy. Along the way, Launchpad is convinced by a salesman that he is dying of "ice-fever", Webby and Dewey try to accomplish the perfect sledding experience, Huey attempts to discover Neverrest's secret: wormholes, and Louie, figuring out that Launchpad was conned, pulls off his own scheme to trick the salesman into confessing the truth to a nearby village and expose him as a fraud.
4	4	"The Great Dime Chase!"	John Aoshima	Story by : Francisco Angones, Madison Bateman, Colleen Evanson, Christian Magalhaes, Bob Snow & Matt Youngberg; Teleplay by : Bateman; Storyboarded by : David Baker, Matthew Humphreys & Tanner Johnson	September 23, 2017	105	0.41
Scrooge decides to take Louie to his Money Bin to show him the value of a hard day's work after witnessing his laziness. While there, Louie loses Scrooge's Number One Dime and decides to use Gyro Gearloose's robotic light-bulb, Little Bulb, to get it back. However, he causes it to become a giant coin-collecting robot, and is forced to stop it all on his own and retrieve the Dime before Scrooge notices. Meanwhile, Dewey and Webby face the McDuck Archives' dedicated keeper, Mrs. Quackfaster, to gain information on Della and solve the mystery of her disappearance. Eventually, they find a note from Della reading "Scrooge, I took the Spear of Selene, I'm sorry" and decide to keep this a secret until they know more.
5	5	"The Beagle Birthday Massacre!"	Dana Terrace	Story by : Francisco Angones, Madison Bateman, Colleen Evanson, Christian Magalhaes & Bob Snow; Teleplay by : Snow; Storyboarded by : Emmy Cicierega, Ben Holm & Jason Reicher	September 30, 2017	106	0.38
Disappointed after having to be left behind by the boys, Webby meets and bonds with a rebellious teenager named Lena. They accidentally crash Ma Beagle's birthday party and are pursued by the whole Beagle clan. They and the boys, who were looking for Webby, are eventually captured, but they manage to escape and remain friends. Unbeknownst to the young ducks, Lena is revealed to be the niece of the evil sorceress, Magica De Spell.
6	6	"The House of the Lucky Gander!"	Matthew Humphreys & Tom Owens	Story by : Francisco Angones, Madison Bateman, Colleen Evanson, Christian Magalhaes & Bob Snow; Teleplay by : Magalhaes; Storyboarded by : Dalton E. Grant Jr., Vaughn Tada & Brandon Warren	October 14, 2017 (Note: On Disney XD Canada, the episodes "The Infernal Internship of Mark Beaks!" and "The House of the Lucky Gander!" aired in an inverted order, on October 14, 2017 and October 21, 2017 respectively.)	107	0.34
During their search for The Temple of the Golden Cricket, Scrooge, the boys, Webby, and Donald make a stop at a casino resort in Macaw to meet with Donald's unnaturally lucky cousin, Gladstone Gander. Louie starts hanging out with Gladstone, resulting in Donald competing for his nephew's attention. Meanwhile, Scrooge and the rest of the kids try to find the exit, but the owner of the casino, Toad Liu Hai, keeps distracting the kids with different gifts. They eventually learn that Liu Hai is actually a luck vampire that had been holding Gladstone hostage to harvest his incredible good luck. Following a competition to decide everyone's fates, the family manages to beat Liu Hai and free Gladstone, all while Louie reconciles with Donald.
7	7	"The Infernal Internship of Mark Beaks!"	John Aoshima	Story by : Francisco Angones, Madison Bateman, Colleen Evanson, Christian Magalhaes & Bob Snow; Teleplay by : Evanson; Storyboarded by : Mark Garcia, Matthew Humphreys & Tanner Johnson	October 21, 2017	108	0.32
Huey and Dewey compete to get a coveted internship under Duckburg tech mogul and up-and-coming billionaire, Mark Beaks. Just then, industrial spy Falcon Graves arrives to take Beaks' Project Ta-Dah, only to learn it is nothing and it was Beaks who hired him so Beaks could build hype for a fake product and become a billionaire. Angered by this, Graves attempts to kill Beaks, but Huey and Dewey manage to put aside their differences in order to save him. Meanwhile, Scrooge reluctantly teams up with Glomgold to get rid of Beaks, but quickly grows tired of his overly-complicated scheme and walks out on him.
8	8	"The Living Mummies of Toth-Ra!"	Dana Terrace	Story by : Francisco Angones, Madison Bateman, Colleen Evanson, Christian Magalhaes & Bob Snow; Teleplay by : Bateman; Storyboarded by : Emmy Cicierega, Ben Holm & Jason Reicher	October 28, 2017	109	0.29
Scrooge, the boys, Webby, and Launchpad enter an Egyptian pyramid in search of the lost tomb of the mummified pharaoh, Toth-Ra, but become separated. Louie and Webby are imprisoned by Toth-Ra himself while the rest of the group try to gain the support of his servants, led by Amunet. While Louie and Webby discover royal guard Sabaf and his ancestors have been using the pharaoh's body to manipulate the servants, the rest of the family, Amunet, and servants break into the throne room and accidentally activate a ritual that resurrects Toth-Ra. Working together, the family, Amunet, and servants undo the ritual before leaving the pyramid to enjoy burritos together.
9	9	"Terror of the Terra-firmians!"	Matthew Humphreys & Tom Owens	Story by : Francisco Angones, Madison Bateman, Colleen Evanson, Christian Magalhaes & Bob Snow; Teleplay by : Magalhaes; Storyboarded by : David Baker, Owens, Vaughn Tada & Brandon Warren	October 7, 2017	110	0.39
After seeing a scary movie, Huey, Webby, and Lena explore an abandoned subway line in search of a race of legendary creatures called the Terra-firmians, only to end up trapped underground with Mrs. Beakley, Louie, Dewey, and Launchpad. As they struggle to escape, Launchpad becomes more and more paranoid, leaving Dewey to help him come back to his senses. Meanwhile, Huey and Webby argue over the Terra-firmians' existence, as Huey believes only in his Junior Woodchuck Guidebook and is afraid to do anything that does not follow its instructions. In the end, however, the two reconcile and find out that the Terra-firmians are actually real. In the midst of their adventure, Lena struggles to gain Mrs. Beakley's trust while secretly receiving instructions from Magica.
10	10	"McMystery at McDuck McManor!"	John Aoshima	Story by : Francisco Angones, Madison Bateman, Colleen Evanson, Christian Magalhaes & Bob Snow; Teleplay by : Evanson; Storyboarded by : Mark Garcia, Matthew Humphreys & Tanner Johnson	May 25, 2018 (Note: This episode made its broadcast premiere on Disney XD Scandinavia on April 3, 2018.)	111	0.78
Huey decides to throw a birthday party for Scrooge, despite everyone warning him that Scrooge hates celebrating getting older. While Beakley, Webby, and Donald leave for the day, Huey enlists his brothers in holding the party. However, when Scrooge goes missing and the guests turn out to be Ma Beagle, Black Arts Beagle, Beaks, and Glomgold, Huey decides to solve the mystery. In the midst of this, Black Arts seemingly summons a demon to make the other villains disappear, but it betrays him and chases the boys. Eventually, they discover the culprit was Scrooge, with the help of the ghost of his faithful butler, Duckworth, who Black Arts unknowingly summoned.
11	11	"The Missing Links of Moorshire!"	Matthew Humphreys	Story by : Francisco Angones, Madison Bateman, Colleen Evanson, Ben Joseph, Christian Magalhaes & Bob Snow; Teleplay by : Joseph; Storyboarded by : Vaughn Tada, Brandon Warren & Jason Zurek	May 18, 2018 (Note: This episode made its broadcast premiere on Disney XD Scandinavia on March 21, 2018.)	113	0.87
Scrooge and Glomgold face off in the "Duckburg Millionaires' Club Golf Invitational" in the Scottish Highlands, assisted by the boys, Webby, and Launchpad. When Dewey shows a natural skill for the sport however, Scrooge gets jealous and they have a falling out. Even worse, the game is hijacked by the spirits of ancient druids and turns lethal, with petrifying mists and a pair of kelpies named Briar and Bramble attempting to have them drowned. On the final hole, Scrooge apologizes to Dewey, inspiring him to win the game and save them from the supernatural golf course.
12	12	"The Spear of Selene!"	Dana Terrace	Story by : Francisco Angones, Madison Bateman, Colleen Evanson, Christian Magalhaes & Bob Snow; Teleplay by : Bateman; Storyboarded by : Emmy Cicierega, Ben Holm & Jason Reicher	May 4, 2018 (Note: Beginning with this episode, new episodes of the show premiere on Disney Channel instead of Disney XD.)	112	1.09
Scrooge and his family get stuck on the island of Ithaquack, home of the Greek gods, where Dewey and Webby try to search for the Spear of Selene and uncover the mystery of Della's disappearance. However, Dewey struggles with the possibility that his mother may not have been a good person. They later find out that the Spear of Selene does not belong to the moon goddess Selene, who reveals that Della was a great person and friend. Meanwhile, Donald is dragged into a competition to settle a dispute between Scrooge and Zeus. Storkules, Zeus' son and an acquaintance of Donald's, encourages him to continue adventuring, even in spite of Della's disappearance.
13	13	"Day of the Only Child!"	Tanner Johnson & Dana Terrace	Story by : Francisco Angones, Madison Bateman, Colleen Evanson, Christian Magalhaes & Bob Snow; Teleplay by : Snow; Storyboarded by : Emmy Cicierega, Ben Holm & Jason Reicher	June 30, 2018	115	0.78
On "Only Child Day", a holiday that Dewey made up, the boys split up and spend the day pretending to be an only child. Huey teaches Burger and Bouncer Beagle how to be good Junior Woodchucks, Louie attempts to befriend spoiled, insane child billionaire Doofus Drake, and Dewey records an episode of his own late-night talk show, Dewey Dew-Night, only to fight a malfunctioning robot Webby reprogrammed in an attempt to keep them all together. In the end, the boys reunite and team up to defeat their respective foes.
14	14	"Beware the B.U.D.D.Y. System!"	John Aoshima	Story by : Francisco Angones, Madison Bateman, Colleen Evanson, Christian Magalhaes & Bob Snow; Teleplay by : Angones; Storyboarded by : Benjamin Balistreri, Evon Freeman, Mark Garcia, Tanner Johnson & John Ramirez	May 11, 2018	114	0.68
Launchpad finally receives his driver's license and goes with Dewey to show Scrooge, who is busy with Gyro and his bumbling intern, Fenton Crackshell-Cabrera. Meanwhile, Beaks unveils a new self-driving car, so Launchpad challenges Beaks' invention to a race to prove that men are better than machines. Even though he loses, Gyro discovers Beaks stole his robot technology after Fenton posted it on the internet. Launchpad and Fenton both lose their jobs and end up humiliated. But when Scrooge, Dewey, Gyro, and Beaks become trapped inside the self-driving car, it is up to Launchpad and Fenton to save them; with Fenton using Gyro's top-secret project, a cybernetic suit, to become the robotic superhero "Gizmoduck". In the end, Launchpad gets his job back and earns Scrooge's recognition, Gyro lets Fenton use his invention permanently, and Beaks plots to get Gizmoduck for his own company.
15	15	"The Golden Lagoon of White Agony Plains!"	John Aoshima	Story by : Francisco Angones, Madison Bateman, Colleen Evanson, Christian Magalhaes & Bob Snow; Teleplay by : Snow; Storyboarded by : Jean-Sebastien Duclos, Mark Garcia, Tanner Johnson & John Ramirez	June 23, 2018	117	0.82
Scrooge runs into his conniving ex-partner and old flame, Goldie O'Gilt, before teaming up with her to find the Golden Lagoon of White Agony Plains. They succeed, but Glomgold interferes, seemingly killing Goldie and claiming the gold for himself. As Glomgold prepares to eliminate Scrooge, Goldie reappears alive, saves him, and escapes with the gold. Upon returning home, Scrooge finds a note from Goldie saying if he ever wants any more gold in his life, he should come find her.
16	16	"Jaw$!"	Matthew Humphreys	Story by : Francisco Angones, Madison Bateman, Colleen Evanson, Christian Magalhaes & Bob Snow; Teleplay by : Evanson; Storyboarded by : Vaughn Tada, Brandon Warren & Jason Zurek	June 16, 2018	116	0.67
Lena unleashes a giant money shark in Scrooge's Money Bin to steal his Number One Dime for Magica. Meanwhile, Scrooge attempts to better his public image with a televised interview, but as the shark escapes the Bin and threatens Duckburg, his image grows worse. Eventually, Lena, torn between Magica's orders and Webby's friendship, stops the shark; saving both the Ducks and the city. Afterward, Magica reminds Lena that her freedom is her reward, so Lena begrudgingly obeys Magica.
17	17	"From the Confidential Case Files of Agent 22!"	Tanner Johnson	Story by : Francisco Angones, Madison Bateman, Colleen Evanson, Christian Magalhaes, Bob Snow; Teleplay by : Magalhaes; Storyboarded by : Emmy Cicierega, Ben Holm & Jason Reicher	July 7, 2018	118	0.71
In flashbacks, Mrs. Beakley first meets Scrooge after being assigned by S.H.U.S.H. director Ludwig Von Drake to track down a page from The Great Book of Castle Dunwyn. Together, they defeat chemist turned F.O.W.L. agent Black Heron and secure the page before she can use its formula for gummiberry juice to create super-soldiers. In the present, Black Heron returns to kidnap Beakley in an attempt to obtain the formula, so Scrooge embarks on a mission with Webby to rescue her.
18	18	"Sky Pirates...In the Sky!"	Matthew Humphreys	Story by : Francisco Angones, Madison Bateman, Colleen Evanson, Christian Magalhaes & Bob Snow; Teleplay by : Bateman; Storyboarded by : Vaughn Tada, Brandon Warren & Jason Zurek	July 28, 2018	119	0.63
Scrooge gets his newly acquired treasure looted by Don Karnage and his show tune-singing sky pirate crew. Dewey, feeling ignored by his family, sneaks onto the pirate ship to get his alpaca-wool hat back. Despite being captured by the pirates, he convinces them to stage a mutiny against Karnage and becomes the new captain. Following another attack on the McDuck plane, The Sunchaser, Dewey reconciles with his family and helps regain Scrooge's treasure, leading to Karnage swearing vengeance against him.
19	19	"The Secret(s) of Castle McDuck!"	Matthew Humphreys	Story by : Francisco Angones, Madison Bateman, Colleen Evanson, Christian Magalhaes & Bob Snow; Teleplay by : Snow; Storyboarded by : Vaughn Tada, Brandon Warren & Jason Zurek	August 4, 2018	122	0.73
To get to the Knights Templar's treasure, Scrooge pays his parents, Fergus and Downy McDuck, a visit. Because of his strained relationship with his father, however, Scrooge sets out to find it himself. Along the way, he discovers that Fergus indirectly gave him his Number One Dime as a gift of "self-reliance", and they reconcile. Meanwhile, Dewey struggles to keep his search for Della a secret from Huey and Louie. Upon Dewey’s eventual confession, Huey and Louie are heartbroken but eventually forgive him. Working together, they find a drawing of the Spear of Selene.
20	20	"Who is Gizmoduck?!"	Tanner Johnson	Story by : Francisco Angones, Madison Bateman, Colleen Evanson, Christian Magalhaes & Bob Snow; Teleplay by : Magalhaes; Storyboarded by : Emmy Cicierega, Ben Holm & Jason Reicher	July 14, 2018	121	0.67
As the Beagle Boys take Huey hostage during a bank robbery, Fenton suits up as Gizmoduck, saving Huey but destroying much of the bank. After being scolded by Gyro, and with his "M'Ma", Officer Cabrera, nagging him for not having a proper job, Fenton accepts an offer to start working for Mark Beaks' company, Waddle. However, Beaks decides to take over the role of Gizmoduck himself to maintain his popularity. The suit malfunctions, but Fenton saves the day. Impressed by his courage, Scrooge hires Fenton/Gizmoduck to protect Duckburg with an improved suit while he is off adventuring.
21	21	"The Other Bin of Scrooge McDuck!"	John Aoshima	Story by : Francisco Angones, Madison Bateman, Colleen Evanson, Christian Magalhaes & Bob Snow; Teleplay by : Evanson; Storyboarded by : Jean-Sebastien Duclos, Kathryn Marusik, Jason Reicher & Fill Marc Sagadraca	July 21, 2018	120	0.70
Following a failed attempt to steal the Number One Dime, Magica overhears Scrooge opting to hide it in his bin of dangerous objects to keep it safe, so she forces Lena to make Webby take her to the "other bin" to obtain the Dime. After having a nightmare of Magica hurting Webby however, Lena decides to stop listening to her aunt. She attempts to expose Magica to Scrooge, but Magica possesses Lena's body with her growing powers and swears to seek the dime herself. Meanwhile, Louie tries to convince Huey and Dewey that Tenderfeet, a Bigfoot that they found, is actually a con artist. Eventually, Louie uses the con's scam against him and has him sent back to the forest.
22	22	"The Last Crash of the Sunchaser!"	John Aoshima	Story by : Francisco Angones, Madison Bateman, Colleen Evanson, Christian Magalhaes & Bob Snow; Teleplay by : Angones; Storyboarded by : Jean-Sebastien Duclos, Sam King & Jason Reicher	August 11, 2018	123	0.73
On the way to another adventure, Scrooge accidentally crashes Launchpad's plane – the Sunchaser – onto a mountaintop, leaving it balancing on a precipice and causing Beakley to confront him about how he regularly endangers the family. Meanwhile, the kids continue their investigation into Della's disappearance, but the adults eventually stumble upon it. In the end, after Dewey endangers himself for a clue, Scrooge comes clean: Della stole a spaceship he built for her – the Spear of Selene – and disappeared into space, causing Donald to cut ties with him. The boys blame Scrooge, and the resulting argument causes the plane to crash. Upon returning home, the boys move back in with Donald while Beakley takes Webby with her on an extended vacation, leaving Scrooge alone once more.
23	23	"The Shadow War!" (Note: This episode is a one-hour special. When aired as two half-hour episodes, the first part is titled "The Night of De Spell!" and the second part is titled "The Day of the Ducks!".)	Matthew Humphreys & Tanner Johnson	Story by : Francisco Angones, Madison Bateman, Colleen Evanson, Christian Magalhaes & Bob Snow; Teleplay by : Bateman, Evanson, Magalhaes & Snow; Storyboarded by : Vince Aparo, Emmy Cicierega, Ben Holm, Vaughn Tada, Brandon Warren & Jason Zurek	August 18, 2018	124–125	0.72
With Scrooge abandoned by his family, Magica – possessing Lena's body and empowered by a lunar eclipse – strikes at him and breaks out of her prison within his dime. Meanwhile, Webby, Launchpad, and Beakley convince Donald and the boys to forgive Scrooge. Just then, Magica reveals herself to all of Duckburg and releases everyone's shadows. Joined by Gyro, Fenton, Little Bulb, and Manny the Headless Man-Horse, Donald, Mrs. Beakley, and Launchpad fight back against Magica while the kids try to get Lena's assistance. At her home, they discover she is a shadow created by Magica and rush back to stop the sorceress. In the end, Lena seemingly sacrifices herself to save Webby before Magica is stripped of her magic and forced to flee. While Webby mourns for Lena, unaware the latter merged with her shadow, the family reunites while a newscast on their heroics is seen by Della, who is stranded on the Moon.

=== Season 2 (2018–19) ===
Note : Episodes in this season are presented based on the official order of the season as stated by co-developer Francisco Angones. This may not reflect the order in which they initially aired or their production number.

No. overall	No. in season	Title	Directed by	Written by	Original release date	Prod. code	U.S. viewers (millions)
24	1	"The Most Dangerous Game... Night!"	Tanner Johnson	Story by : Francisco Angones, Madison Bateman, Colleen Evanson, Christian Magalhaes & Bob Snow; Teleplay by : Angones; Storyboarded by : Vince Aparo, Emmy Cicierega & Ben Holm	October 20, 2018	201	0.58
Tired of the constant adventuring, Louie attempts to avoid another one by proposing a family game night, causing Scrooge's competitive nature to kick in. Meanwhile, Gyro discovers a species of miniature people he has dubbed the "Gyropudlians" living at McDuck Manor after inventing a shrink-ray to make contact with them. However, Louie panics and uses the ray on Gyro to silence him. He then convinces Huey to help him keep the others in the dark about the increasingly hostile Gyropudlians, but things escalate during a game of "Scroogeopoly" (a parody of Monopoly). In the end, Louie steps up and saves the day, gaining Scrooge's respect.
25	2	"The Depths of Cousin Fethry!"	Matthew Humphreys	Story by : Francisco Angones, Madison Bateman, Colleen Evanson, Christian Magalhaes & Bob Snow; Teleplay by : Magalhaes; Storyboarded by : Stephanie Gonzaga, Vaughn Tada, Brandon Warren & Jason Zurek	October 27, 2018	202	0.60
Huey and Dewey have Launchpad take them to visit Donald's oddball cousin, Fethry Duck, whom they believe is a scientist working at one of Scrooge's marine stations. However, they eventually realize he is just the station's caretaker and turn to leave, but are attacked by a sea monster. In the end, Huey calms the creature by singing to it and Fethry realizes it is actually his pet krill, Mitzi, who was mutated by hydrothermal vents. Afterward, Fethry decides to become a real scientist and leaves with Mitzi while the boys meet up with Launchpad, who had his own adventure.
26	3	"The Ballad of Duke Baloney!"	Jason Zurek	Story by : Francisco Angones, Madison Bateman, Colleen Evanson, Christian Magalhaes & Bob Snow; Teleplay by : Evanson; Storyboarded by : Jean-Sebastien Duclos, Sam King & Mike Morris	November 3, 2018	203	0.52
Glomgold has been missing for four months following Magica's attack, during which time he was replaced by Zan Owlson as his company's CEO. He was found with amnesia by fishermen, Fisher and Mann, and adopted a new identity as the fisherman "Duke Baloney". Louie and Webby eventually stumble upon him and investigate, only to find no record of his past. They then take Scrooge to meet him, but he decides to let him be, as he is happy. However, Glomgold ultimately regains his memory: born "Duke Baloney", he was a shoeshiner who did Scrooge's shoes and was paid with a dime to teach him "self-reliance", only to feel cheated and vow vengeance. He then returns to his company and makes a bet with Scrooge: whoever is richer by the end of the year gets the loser's company.
27	4	"The Town Where Everyone Was Nice!"	Tanner Johnson	Story by : Francisco Angones, Madison Bateman, Colleen Evanson, Christian Magalhaes & Bob Snow; Teleplay by : Bateman; Storyboarded by : Vince Aparo, Emmy Cicierega & Ben Holm	November 10, 2018	204	0.55
The family visits a Brazilian town to celebrate the mysterious festival, "The Feast of the Flower". While there, Donald reunites with his old college friends, José Carioca and Panchito Pistoles. Learning that they appear to each live a successful life, Donald pretends to be a billionaire to impress them, with Scrooge and Huey playing along. Meanwhile, Webby tries to get Dewey and Louie to fully experience the festival, but they just want to take pictures. They all soon discover that the town's friendly locals are all part of a giant carnivorous plant. After Donald tells the truth and learns that his friends also lied, the Three Caballeros reunite to fight the plant with music.
28	5	"Storkules in Duckburg!"	Matthew Humphreys	Story by : Francisco Angones, Madison Bateman, Colleen Evanson, Christian Magalhaes & Bob Snow; Teleplay by : Snow; Storyboarded by : Stephanie Gonzaga, Vaughn Tada & Brandon Warren	November 17, 2018	205	0.57
Louie wants to start his own company, but is unable to decide on what kind. Meanwhile, Donald rents out a room on his houseboat, but is surprised that Storkules, who was kicked out by his father, is the renter. However, Storkules soon finds that a flock of harpies followed him to Duckburg and are causing havoc. Seeing this as an opportunity, Louie starts a monster-control business, "Harp-B-Gone", with Huey, Webby, and Storkules. However, Storkules secretly stores them on the houseboat, and they eventually break free and take off with Donald. In the end, "Harp-B-Gone" saves Donald and recaptures the harpies. Louie realizes he let his success go to his head and disbands the business, giving the harpies to Scrooge to use as workers at a lemonade company after realizing their potential.
29	6	"Last Christmas!"	Jason Zurek	Story by : Francisco Angones, Madison Bateman, Colleen Evanson, Christian Magalhaes & Bob Snow; Teleplay by : Angones; Storyboarded by : Jean-Sebastien Duclos, Sam King & Jason Reicher	December 1, 2018	206	0.53
The family is celebrating Christmas, except for Scrooge and Dewey. In actuality though, Scrooge secretly goes back in time every Christmas to revisit his best parties with the Ghosts of Christmas Past, Present, and Future. However, he eventually realizes the real fun of Christmas is spending it with family. Past, on the other hand, refuses to let go of their fun times together and traps him in time, but Scrooge outsmarts him and escapes. Meanwhile, Dewey, who secretly followed Scrooge to the past, ends up facing a wendigo with a younger Donald and Della. They manage to capture it, after which it is revealed to be Past. Scrooge, who came to take Dewey back, then makes up with Past and they all return to the present to spend Christmas with the others. Concurrently on the moon, Della gives everyone her best wishes as she continues to fix her spaceship.
30	7	"What Ever Happened to Della Duck?!"	Tanner Johnson	Story by : Francisco Angones, Madison Bateman, Colleen Evanson, Christian Magalhaes & Bob Snow; Teleplay by : Bateman & Evanson; Storyboarded by : Vince Aparo, Emmy Cicierega & Ben Holm	March 9, 2019	207	0.61
Ten years ago, after losing contact with Scrooge during her flight, Della crash-lands on the moon. Now with a robotic leg and Gyro's Oxy-Chew gum – which provides oxygen, water, and nutrients – Della works feverishly to get back to Earth and her sons. However, her efforts are hindered by a giant metal-eating moon mite, and her ship needing gold as fuel. By the present, Della still has not found any gold, but she meets two aliens, Moonlanders named Gen. Lunaris and Lt. Penumbra. Following this, she befriends the mite, which turns out to be a mother finding food for her child. As Della prepares to accept her fate of being stranded on the moon, she is invited to the aliens' hidden city, Tranquility. Seeing that the city has gold, Della finds herself one step closer to getting home.
31	8	"Friendship Hates Magic!"	Matthew Humphreys	Story by : Francisco Angones, Madison Bateman, Colleen Evanson, Christian Magalhaes, Bob Snow & Rachel Vine; Teleplay by : Vine; Storyboarded by : Stephanie Gonzaga, Victoria Harris, Vaughn Tada & Brandon Warren	May 15, 2019 (Note: This episode made its broadcast premiere on Disney Channel Netherlands on April 28, 2019.)	208	0.33
While searching for a way to bring Lena back, unaware she is watching over her, Webby befriends another supernatural enthusiast, Violet Sabrewing, who suggests they have a sleepover. However, Lena becomes suspicious of Violet after learning she has Magica's amulet and tries to warn Webby. Webby and Violet are eventually able to enter the Shadow Realm, where the former reunites with Lena, only to then be attacked by tulpas manifested from Lena's jealousy towards Violet. They are able to ward the spirits off, though this causes Lena to fade away as well. However, by combining the magic from Magica's amulet and Webby's friendship bracelet, Webby and Violet are able to permanently bring Lena back to the mortal world. Meanwhile, Beakley desperately tries to befriend Launchpad after realizing she has no friends, and ends up bonding with him over his favorite TV show, Darkwing Duck.
32	9	"Treasure of the Found Lamp!"	Jason Zurek	Story by : Francisco Angones, Madison Bateman, Colleen Evanson, Christian Magalhaes & Bob Snow; Teleplay by : Magalhaes; Storyboarded by : Jean-Sebastien Duclos, Sam King & Mike Morris	May 7, 2019	209	0.32
An Arabian warrior named D'jinn comes to Duckburg to reclaim the Lamp of the First Genie from Scrooge. After finding out that Louie accidentally sold the lamp at a yard sale, Scrooge and Webby stall the warrior with a phony quest at Ithaquack while the boys look for the lamp. Both of their adventures eventually lead them to the junkyard and into a mad dash to reclaim said lamp from the Beagle Boys before sunrise. Ma tries to rub the lamp to summon the genie, but nothing happens. D'jinn reveals that there is no genie inside anymore; it turns out that he wanted it for his birthday because it belonged to his ancestor, who instead of having the genie grant her wishes, befriended and fell in love with him. Though she made one wish, it was to free the genie so they could marry. Seeing that telling stories has value, Scrooge decides to have a museum exhibit dedicated to his adventures opened for everyone to see, including his family.
33	10	"The Outlaw Scrooge McDuck!"	Tanner Johnson	Story by : Francisco Angones, Madison Bateman, Colleen Evanson, Christian Magalhaes & Bob Snow; Teleplay by : Magalhaes; Storyboarded by : Vince Aparo, Emmy Cicierega & Ben Holm	May 8, 2019	210	0.26
After Louie gives up a business venture because of a simple obstacle, Scrooge tells him a story of when he was a prospector in the Old West in the hopes of inspiring him to be just like him. While at a town called Gumption, he ran into Goldie and the two race for gold. However, their claim was stolen by John D. Rockerduck, who bought the town to con it. Scrooge and Goldie, along with Fenton's sheriff ancestor and a time-traveling Gyro, teamed up to get the gold back. Though the gold was destroyed in the end, its pieces ended up in the river near Gumption, triggering a gold rush. After the story, Louie takes the wrong lesson from it and calls Goldie to learn her skills, despite knowing his uncle will be furious when he hears about this.
34	11	"The 87 Cent Solution!"	Matthew Humphreys	Story by : Francisco Angones, Madison Bateman, Colleen Evanson, Christian Magalhaes & Bob Snow; Teleplay by : Snow; Storyboarded by : Stephanie Gonzaga, Vaughn Tada & Brandon Warren	May 9, 2019	211	0.36
Finding that he has been robbed of 87 cents, a sickly Scrooge goes on a rampage to find them. The kids think that he is suffering from gold fever and team up with Launchpad, Gyro, Manny, and Gizmoduck to calm him down. When news spreads that Scrooge died from the fever, a triumphant Glomgold shows up at the funeral and reveals he was the robber. Using Gyro's Time Teaser - a watch capable of stopping time - he hoped to make Scrooge go crazy and win their bet. With the truth revealed, Scrooge comes out of hiding, having faked his death to trick Glomgold into confessing.
35	12	"The Golden Spear!"	Jason Zurek	Story by : Francisco Angones, Madison Bateman, Colleen Evanson, Christian Magalhaes & Bob Snow; Teleplay by : Snow; Storyboarded by : Jean-Sebastien Duclos, Sam King & Mike Morris	May 10, 2019	212	0.33
On the moon, Della fixes the Spear of Selene with the Moonlanders' help and promises to bring them to Earth with her. However, Penumbra, wanting her people to stay and be safe, decides to activate the launch sequence early, forcing Della to take off alone. Before leaving, she gives the rocket plans to Lunaris and heads to Earth. After the take-off, Lunaris lies to the Moonlanders that Della attacked him and left them behind, rallying them into declaring war on Earth. Meanwhile, Donald attempts to relax, but keeps getting interrupted by his family's adventures. To make it up to him, the family and Storkules send him on a vacation. While waiting for the bus, he sees Della's rocket crash and runs to greet her, but finds it empty. Accidentally starting the rocket, Donald is launched into space just as Della reaches McDuck Manor.
36	13	"Nothing Can Stop Della Duck!"	Tanner Johnson	Story by : Francisco Angones, Madison Bateman, Colleen Evanson, Christian Magalhaes & Bob Snow; Teleplay by : Evanson; Storyboarded by : Vince Aparo, Emmy Cicierega & Ben Holm	May 13, 2019	213	0.43
Della is reunited with her family, but has a tough time readjusting. While ranting about how to be a better mother, she accidentally reactivates the Gilded Man, El Dorado's golden robot, which she defeated as a child. The robot attempts to kill Della, but with help from the boys and the rest of the family, she is able to defeat it once more. Afterward, she promises to be the best mom she can be, and the boys embrace her. Meanwhile, Donald lands on the Moon and uses Oxy-Chew to save himself from suffocating, only to be taken prisoner by the Moonlanders.
37	14	"Raiders of the Doomsday Vault!"	Matthew Humphreys	Story by : Francisco Angones, Madison Bateman, Colleen Evanson, Christian Magalhaes & Bob Snow; Teleplay by : Bateman; Storyboarded by : Stephanie Gonzaga, Vaughn Tada & Brandon Warren	May 14, 2019	214	0.41
Ludwig von Drake's Arctic doomsday vault – built as a safekeep in case of worldwide disaster, and a reference to the real-life Svalbard Global Seed Vault (nicknamed the "Doomsday Vault") – has been damaged. In response, Scrooge brings Della and Dewey to convince Von Drake's grown-up children that McDuck Enterprises can secure its contents, including the seeds of the Money Tree of Oramorris. Glomgold and Owlson arrive hoping to close the deal for their company, but he spoils their chances by revealing his plan to steal the seeds and blow up the vault. Della and Dewey sneak off to see the seeds before Scrooge seals the vault, but accidentally cause mayhem and severely add to the damage. Dewey blames himself, but Della, using the skills she learned on the moon, saves the situation and assures her son that he will never have to prove himself to her.
38	15	"The Dangerous Chemistry of Gandra Dee!"	Jason Zurek	Story by : Francisco Angones, Madison Bateman, Colleen Evanson, Christian Magalhaes & Bob Snow; Teleplay by : Magalhaes; Storyboarded by : Jean-Sebastien Duclos, Sam King & Jason Reicher	May 16, 2019	215	0.34
While shopping for tech with Huey and Webby, Fenton meets rebel punk scientist, Gandra Dee, and invites her to his lab. Thinking it is a date, Huey, Webby, Lil Bulb, and Manny help make the evening romantic by setting up a dinner and locking Gyro in a closet, despite Fenton wanting it to be all science. However, they soon discover that Gandra is working with Beaks to get Fenton's passcode so Beaks can use stolen Gizmo-tech and Gandra's nanites to give himself super-strength. After beating down Gizmoduck and damaging the suit, Beaks kidnaps the kids, so Fenton goes after him. Having a change of heart, Gandra turns on Beaks and tries to short out his nanites, but his skin proves to be too tough. Fenton then distracts Beaks with his one weakness, social media popularity, so he and Gandra can beat him with his "Fentonium"-powered ping-pong ball. Before she stealthily leaves, Gandra gives Fenton the equation he needed to stabilize said ping-pong ball.
39	16	"The Duck Knight Returns!"	Tanner Johnson	Story by : Francisco Angones, Madison Bateman, Colleen Evanson, Christian Magalhaes & Bob Snow; Teleplay by : Angones; Storyboarded by : Vince Aparo, Emmy Cicierega & Ben Holm	May 17, 2019	216	0.39
Launchpad and Dewey meet the washed-up star of Darkwing Duck, Jim Starling, and learn Scrooge is making a movie adaptation with Alistair Boorswan directing. After a disappointing trailer, however, Scrooge puts Dewey in charge while Starling learns he has been replaced by a younger actor, Drake Mallard. Starling convinces Launchpad to help him get rid of Drake so he can reprise his role, but the latter changes his mind upon realizing Drake is a genuine fan. Starling, on the other hand, remains unwilling to pass the torch and goes on a rampage throughout the set to finish the movie himself while Launchpad and Drake try to stop him. In the end, Starling seemingly sacrifices himself to save Launchpad and Drake from an accident he caused and Scrooge cancels the movie. Afterward, Launchpad encourages Drake to become a real superhero, while Starling is revealed to have survived, but has gone insane.
40	17	"Happy Birthday, Doofus Drake!"	Matthew Humphreys	Story by : Francisco Angones, Madison Bateman, Colleen Evanson, Christian Magalhaes & Bob Snow; Teleplay by : Angones & Snow; Storyboarded by : Stephanie Gonzaga, Vaughn Tada & Brandon Warren	September 4, 2019	217	0.22
Scrooge discovers Louie has turned to Goldie for help in getting rich. She inevitably turns on Louie until she sees that he was invited to Doofus' birthday party and asks him to take her. They arrive pretending to be an aunt and nephew intending to take all of the million-dollar gift bags. However, Doofus sniffs out frauds among his guests and sends them to his "Honey Bin", leaving Louie and Goldie; Glomgold and his puppet-son; and Beaks and his robot-son, B.O.Y.D. Once he removes Glomgold and Beaks, Doofus demands to know who ruined his party. Goldie blames Louie and Doofus has B.O.Y.D. attack him, but Goldie saves him. The party turns out to be a test, as Doofus claims Goldie as his new "Gemeemama". Louie is allowed to leave with the gift bags, but decides to rescue Goldie and give B.O.Y.D. to Doofus as a brother. B.O.Y.D. then transfers half of Doofus' fortune to his account for his new parents, allowing them to finally ground Doofus. During the confusion, Goldie steals the gift bags, but keeps a picture of Louie. Meanwhile, Della gets Huey out of his comfort zone in a video game.
41	18	"What Ever Happened to Donald Duck?!"	Jason Reicher & Jason Zurek	Story by : Francisco Angones, Madison Bateman, Colleen Evanson, Christian Magalhaes & Bob Snow; Teleplay by : Evanson; Storyboarded by : Jean-Sebastien Duclos, Victoria Harris, Sam King & Jason Reicher	September 3, 2019	218	0.30
Lunaris passes off Donald as a spy and sends him to the gold mines. Not wanting the invasion to happen however, Penumbra secretly frees Donald and tells him to meet her at Lunaris' hangar so they can destroy the rocket fleet. When they eventually get there, they find that Lunaris had been planning to attack Earth long before Della came. Penumbra gives Donald a transmitter to warn Earth of the invasion before she is suddenly subdued. Lunaris appears and fights Donald after he threatens the boys' lives, but the latter is able to escape on the former's prototype rocket and return to Earth. Meanwhile, Dewey and Webby, wanting another mystery to solve, take up the case of Huey's returned postcard to Donald. Their investigation leads them to a man named Jones, who they believe might be behind Donald's apparent disappearance. They later find out that he was Donald's anger management counselor, who helped him channel his temper into protective instinct. After picking them up, Scrooge gets Donald's message, but fails to understand it due to poor reception.
42	19	"A Nightmare on Killmotor Hill!"	Tanner Johnson	Story by : Francisco Angones, Madison Bateman, Emmy Cicierega, Colleen Evanson, Christian Magalhaes & Bob Snow; Teleplay by : Cicierega; Storyboarded by : Vince Aparo, Cicierega, Victoria Harris & Ben Holm	September 5, 2019	219	0.25
After a long night celebrating Webby and Lena's one-year anniversary as friends, they, Violet, and the boys go to sleep. However, they enter a dream world through Lena's magic and travel through their favorite dreams. All the while, Lena secretly tries to avoid Magica, who has been invading her dreams over the past week. She eventually falls into her nightmare, where Magica claims that she is still evil because she is just like her. The others arrive to help Lena, but Magica turns Lena into a copy of her so they will attack her instead and prove Magica's point. After Lena saves Webby from a falling chandelier, the latter sees her friendship bracelet, realizes she is not fighting Magica, and pulls Lena away from the real sorceress with Violet and the boys' help. When the kids wake up, they discover Magica used a telepathy helmet to invade their dreams since she is still powerless. Seeing this, Lena destroys Magica's helmet and the kids walk away while Magica vows vengeance.
43	20	"The Golden Armory of Cornelius Coot!"	Matthew Humphreys	Story by : Francisco Angones, Madison Bateman, Colleen Evanson, Christian Magalhaes & Bob Snow; Teleplay by : Magalhaes & Snow; Storyboarded by : Stephanie Gonzaga, Vaughn Tada & Brandon Warren	September 6, 2019	220	0.21
At Fort Duckburg, Webby convinces the boys to join her on an adventure to find Cornelius Coot's golden armory, which Della never found. They discover a secret mine entrance under Coot's statue, and using Della's journal, search for the treasure. Meanwhile, Big Time Beagle, who was kicked out of the Beagle Boys, follows them in the hopes of finding the treasure first and winning back Ma's approval. Elsewhere, Della tries to get ready to sky-write over the fort, but has to repair the plane with Launchpad. The kids find the treasure, which turns out to be corn, disappointing Webby. They are taken hostage by the Beagles, but they are saved when Della and Launchpad crash into the mine. Webby resumes looking for clues, so Della goes after her while Big Time captures the others with an army of spiders. When Della finds her, Webby reveals her determination to be like her, but Della assures her that she is already a great adventurer. They then discover that Coot used the corn and giant popcorn poppers to imitate gunfire and scare his enemies into retreating. The group escape the cave, while Ma invites Big Time back into the gang.
44	21	"Timephoon!"	Jason Zurek	Story by : Francisco Angones, Madison Bateman, Colleen Evanson, Christian Magalhaes & Bob Snow; Teleplay by : Bateman; Storyboarded by : Samir Barrett, Victoria Harris, Sam King & Jason Reicher	September 9, 2019	221	0.24
While preparing the manor for a hurricane, Beakley confronts Della about her lack of strictness. Meanwhile, Louie's latest scheme, treasure hunting through time with Gyro's Time Tub, goes wrong when it turns said hurricane into a "timephoon", bringing people from the past to the present. To stop the disaster, Louie returns the treasures. However, it fails, and Della catches him in the act. Things then go from bad to worse as each family member is sent to a different time period, leaving only Louie. In the end, with help from a caveduck named Bubba, Louie returns the time-displaced people, and everyone is returned. However, while the others forgive Louie, Della grounds him for his actions. Afterward, Huey ponders if Bubba might have been a Clan McDuck ancestor.
45	22	"GlomTales!"	Tanner Johnson	Story by : Francisco Angones, Madison Bateman, Colleen Evanson, Christian Magalhaes & Bob Snow; Teleplay by : Evanson; Storyboarded by : Vince Aparo, Emmy Cicierega & Ben Holm	September 10, 2019	222	0.23
A grounded Louie tries to escape the manor and join the family's latest adventure, but is constantly stopped by Della's countermeasures. Meanwhile, in a final attempt to win the bet before the deadline, Glomgold teams up with the Beagle Boys, Beaks, Karnage, and Magica to invade the manor. Finding himself at the villains' mercy, Louie tells Glomgold how to win in return for being made his business partner. They then confront the family and, as instructed by Louie, pool their resources together just as time runs out, allowing Glomgold to win the bet. However, since "Glomgold" is a fake identity, everything goes to Louie instead. Afterward, the villains turn on Glomgold, forcing him to flee. Della is happy that Louie seemingly learned his lesson. However, he hesitates when she tells him to give Scrooge his company back.
46	23	"The Richest Duck in the World!"	Matthew Humphreys	Story by : Francisco Angones, Madison Bateman, Colleen Evanson, Christian Magalhaes & Bob Snow; Teleplay by : Bateman; Storyboarded by : Stephanie Gonzaga, Vaughn Tada & Brandon Warren	September 11, 2019	223	0.25
After effectively winning the bet, Louie decides to keep Scrooge and Glomgold's companies and fortunes, making him "the Richest Duck in the World". However, he ends up accidentally releasing a monster bent on destroying the world's richest person known as the Bombie. In the end, following several failed attempts to escape the creature, Louie realizes the only way to stop it is to be humble, so he shines its shoes with Scrooge and gives the billionaire his company back. Meanwhile, Della tries to make radio contact with Penumbra, though Dewey causes her to question if they were ever truly friends. Ultimately, Della does get a message from Penumbra, who reaffirms their friendship, but warns her of Lunaris' invasion.
47	24	"Moonvasion!" (Note: This episode is a one-hour special. When aired as two half-hour episodes they are titled as "Moonvasion! Part I" and "Moonvasion! Part II".)	Tanner Johnson & Jason Zurek	Story by : Francisco Angones, Madison Bateman, Colleen Evanson, Christian Magalhaes & Bob Snow; Teleplay by : Bateman, Evanson, Magalhaes & Snow; Storyboarded by : Vince Aparo, Kristen Gish, Victoria Harris, Ben Holm, Sam King, Kat Marusik, Stephan Park, William Ruzicka & Brandon Warren	September 12, 2019	224–225	0.17
As the Moonlanders launch their invasion, Scrooge gathers allies for a counterattack. However, it fails and Lunaris reveals his plan to make the Earth revolve around the Moon using a planetary engine. Elsewhere, a fearful Della flies the kids to safety, disguising it as a recruitment drive, but they are attacked and crash on an island; where they find Donald. Della tries to sway the others from leaving until Louie helps her see that it is okay to have bad experiences, as there will be good ones, singing each other the Moon lullaby. Gladstone and Fethry soon find them and take them back to Duckburg on Mitzi. Meanwhile, Scrooge allies with Glomgold in return for giving the latter his company back and outsmarts Lunaris with one of his nemesis' dumb schemes. In response, Lunaris flees in his ship and attempts to destroy Earth, leading to a space battle against the Ducks. In the end, Penumbra arrives and damages Lunaris' ship, leaving him stranded in orbit. Afterward, the Moonlanders stop the invasion and the family celebrates, unaware that F.O.W.L. is watching.

=== Season 3 (2020–21) ===
No. overall	No. in season	Title	Directed by	Written by	Original release date	Prod. code	U.S. viewers (millions)
48	1	"Challenge of the Senior Junior Woodchucks!"	Matthew Humphreys	Story by : Francisco Angones, Madison Bateman, Colleen Evanson, Christian Magalhaes & Bob Snow; Teleplay by : Angones & Bateman; Storyboarded by : Stephanie Gonzaga, Krystal Ureta & Brandon Warren	April 4, 2020 (Note: Beginning with this episode, new episodes of the show premiere on Disney XD instead of Disney Channel.)	304	0.19
Huey and Violet partake in a competition for a promotion to Senior Woodchuck. However, as Violet proves herself the better scout, Huey gets desperate and resorts to foul play. In the end, though, Huey's conscience, appearing as a talking Woodchuck guidebook, gets through to him and he gracefully forfeits. Meanwhile, Scrooge finds a map to the treasure of Woodchucks founder Isabella Finch, only for the others to follow a strange bird instead. Ultimately, the family help Scrooge see that having your own adventure is more fun than following someone else's, and the bird ends up leading them to Finch's treasure: a list of "Missing Mysteries" she never solved. The family resolve to find them, unaware that F.O.W.L. is spying on them and plotting the same thing.
49	2	"Quack Pack!"	Tanner Johnson	Story by : Francisco Angones, Madison Bateman, Colleen Evanson, Christian Magalhaes & Bob Snow; Teleplay by : Snow; Storyboarded by : Vince Aparo, Kristen Gish & Victoria Harris	April 4, 2020	303	0.19
While preparing to take a group photo, the family realizes something is wrong and soon find they are trapped in a '90s sitcom called Quack Pack. Through a flashback sequence, they learn that, while on an adventure to find a Missing Mystery called the Lost Lamp of Collie Baba, Donald blurted out loud that he wished for a normal life whilst unknowingly sitting near the lamp and the genie, Gene, granted it. The family demand to be sent back, but Donald refuses and storms off while the wish begins fighting back to prevent the others from escaping. However, guest star Goofy helps Donald see that each family has their own idea of "normal" and he goes back to save his own. They eventually find the lamp and Donald uses his second wish to undo his first. Afterward, Donald uses his last wish to get the family picture he wanted, depicting them adventuring.
50	3	"Double-O-Duck in You Only Crash Twice!"	Jason Zurek	Story by : Francisco Angones, Madison Bateman, Colleen Evanson, Christian Magalhaes & Bob Snow; Teleplay by : Magalhaes; Storyboarded by : Sam King, Kat Marusik, Rachel Paek & Stephan Park	April 11, 2020	305	0.14
While visiting Funso's, Scrooge becomes addicted to arcade games while Dewey and Launchpad play a VR spy game. Meanwhile, F.O.W.L. Director Bradford Buzzard orders agents Heron and Steelbeak to remove Scrooge before he discovers Funso's is their base. Much to Heron's chagrin though, Steelbeak captures Dewey and Launchpad, who still think they are in the game, increasing their likelihood of discovery. Heron plans to use an "Intelli-Ray", powered by an intelligence-controlling Missing Mystery called the Third Eye Diamond, to make Scrooge dumb. However, Steelbeak hijacks the operation after she insults him, inadvertently increasing Launchpad's intelligence before abducting Dewey. Steelbeak tries to use the Intelli-Ray on all of Duckburg, but Launchpad stops him with help from F.O.W.L.'s former lab rats, though at the cost of his intelligence. Afterward, Launchpad's stupidity prevents him from warning Scrooge about F.O.W.L. while Bradford reprimands Heron and Steelbeak for nearly compromising their plans.
51	4	"The Lost Harp of Mervana!"	Tanner Johnson	Story by : Francisco Angones, Madison Bateman, Colleen Evanson, Christian Magalhaes & Bob Snow; Teleplay by : Evanson; Storyboarded by : Vince Aparo, Kristen Gish & Victoria Harris	April 18, 2020	306	0.13
The family heads to Mervana, an underwater society of mer-people, to find its Missing Mystery, the Lost Harp of Mervana. While the Mervanans teach Scrooge, Huey, Dewey, and Donald their ways, Louie, Webby, and Beakley follow a mysterious sound. They eventually find it belongs to the harp, a sentient artifact that tells or confirms the truth, and learn that Mervana fell into the sea after its ruler, King Honestus, fled from his duties; turning into a monster. The harp also makes Beakley reveal the lies she told to Webby over the years, causing her to become depressed. Honestus attacks the family, but Louie is able to restore Webby's confidence and help everyone fight him off until they reach land, where the Mervanans grow legs and Honestus turns back to normal. Afterward, the Mervanans tell Honestus that he does not have to shoulder his duties alone and they rebuild Mervana together while the family departs and Beakley assures Webby she has no more secrets, which the harp reveals is yet another lie.
52	5	"Louie's Eleven!"	Matthew Humphreys	Story by : Francisco Angones, Madison Bateman, Colleen Evanson, Christian Magalhaes, Ben Siemon & Bob Snow; Teleplay by : Angones & Bateman; Storyboarded by : Stephanie Gonzaga, Rachel Paek, Krystal Ureta & Brandon Warren	April 25, 2020	307	0.16
The Three Caballeros struggle to find a sponsor when they are approached by Louie, who offers a scheme dubbed "Louie's Eleven": infiltrate the party of trendsetter Emma Glamour and have her put them on her blog. However, things go south when Donald gets trapped in an elevator with Glamour's assistant, Daisy Duck, and Glamour herself sees through the plan. Even worse, a group led by Graves steal Glamour's phone for their employer, who turns out to be Glamour's son: Beaks. Fortunately, Donald and Daisy, having bonded in the elevator, are able to escape and defeat Graves. Afterward, the Caballeros perform, though Donald's singing annoys everyone but Daisy.
53	6	"Astro B.O.Y.D.!"	Jason Zurek	Story by : Francisco Angones, Madison Bateman, Colleen Evanson, Christian Magalhaes, Ben Siemon & Bob Snow; Teleplay by : Magalhaes; Storyboarded by : Sam King, Kat Marusik, Rachel Paek & Stephan Park	May 2, 2020	308	0.18
Huey befriends B.O.Y.D. while on a camping trip, but the latter malfunctions. When Huey takes him to the lab, Gyro recognizes B.O.Y.D. as his creation and insists that he is dangerous. Due to B.O.Y.D.'s malfunctions however, he begrudgingly takes them to Tokyolk to fix him before he becomes a threat; with Fenton providing protection. After being accosted by Inspector Tezuka and getting separated from Gizmoduck while foiling a robbery, Huey and B.O.Y.D. bond further. However, Gyro's former mentor, Dr. Akita, learns of the android's return and takes control of him to get revenge. While fighting Akita, Gyro remembers caring for B.O.Y.D. like a real boy, and discovers that Akita overwrote his programming and forced B.O.Y.D. to become a weapon. With Lil Bulb's help, Gyro beats Akita and reconciles with B.O.Y.D. Now in control of his programming, B.O.Y.D. starts living life for himself while Gyro promotes Fenton.
54	7	"The Rumble for Ragnarok!"	Tanner Johnson	Story by : Francisco Angones, Madison Bateman, Colleen Evanson, Christian Magalhaes, Ben Siemon & Bob Snow; Teleplay by : Snow; Storyboarded by : Vince Aparo, Kristen Gish & Victoria Harris	May 9, 2020	309	0.17
Scrooge takes the kids to Valhalla for a decennial wrestling tournament against Team Ragnarök, led by Jörmungandr, for the fate of the world. While Scrooge wins the first round against Strongbeard, he hurts his back, forcing Dewey to take his place. However, Dewey begins doubting himself and loses the second round when he fails to get the crowd on his side. Before the final round, Scrooge helps Dewey see that doing the right thing does not always mean getting everyone's approval. Though Dewey is no match for Jörmungandr, his determination rallies the crowd to his side and convinces Strongbeard to lend him his magical beard, which increases Dewey's strength and allows him to win the tournament.
55	8	"The Phantom and the Sorceress!"	Stephanie Gonzaga & Matthew Humphreys	Story by : Francisco Angones, Madison Bateman, Colleen Evanson, Christian Magalhaes, Ben Siemon & Bob Snow; Teleplay by : Evanson; Storyboarded by : Adam Henry, Krystal Ureta & Brandon Warren	September 21, 2020	310	0.11
Lena is struggling to control Magica's amulet, so Webby and Violet try to cheer her up with a sleepover. However, they are interrupted by an uncharacteristically unlucky Gladstone before being attacked by F.O.W.L. agent Phantom Blot, who stole Gladstone's luck and now seeks Magica's amulet. After narrowly driving him off, Webby and Violet convince Lena to seek out Magica to help her control the amulet, which the sorceress agrees to as the Blot is an old enemy of hers. While the Blot overpowers them and drains the amulet, Lena uses her own magic, powered by the bonds with her friends, to defeat the Blot and return the stolen magic and luck. Magica betrays the girls, regaining her amulet and powers, but is beaten by Lena, who pledges to use her powers to battle dark magical forces.
56	9	"They Put a Moonlander on the Earth!"	Sam King & Jason Zurek	Story by : Francisco Angones, Madison Bateman, Colleen Evanson, Sam King, Christian Magalhaes, Ben Siemon & Bob Snow; Teleplay by : King & Snow; Storyboarded by : Sam King, Kat Marusik, Rachel Paek & Stephan Park	September 28, 2020	311	0.17
Della urges Webby and Dewey to bring Penumbra with them to the pier after the kids learn of the grand opening of the Flintferris Glomwheel, Glomgold's latest gift to Duckburg. Penumbra is reluctant to join the children in their "Earth fun", but changes her mind after being criticized by her fellow Moonlanders for her stoic attitude. At the pier, Webby struggles to encourage Penumbra to appreciate her new life on Earth, but experiences a breakthrough after she confides in her that she has learned to be more than just "Mansion Webby". Her success proves temporary however, as Penumbra grows frustrated with Earth once again, and is then used by Glomgold as a scapegoat when a safety inspector deems the Glomwheel dangerous. In the ensuing chaos, Webby and Dewey end up trapped aboard the Glomwheel, which turns out to be a cannon aimed at McDuck Manor and is collapsing due to its shoddy workmanship. Spurred on by the crisis, Penumbra rescues her friends with the aid of Launchpad and fellow Moonlander Gibbous, and embraces her new purpose as a protector of Earth.
57	10	"The Trickening!"	Matthew Humphreys	Story by : Francisco Angones, Madison Bateman, Colleen Evanson, Christian Magalhaes & Bob Snow; Teleplay by : Magalhaes; Storyboarded by : Stephanie Gonzaga, Vaugh Tada, Krystal Ureta & Brandon Warren	October 5, 2020	301	0.16
At Louie's behest, the kids abandon Huey's Halloween trick-or-treating plans and venture into a haunted house that is said to contain years' worth of candy left there by terrified kids. However, they encounter the monsters Wereduck, Witch Hazel, Nosferatu, and Frankenstein, who scare kids to get candy. Seeing that they do not have any, the monsters decide to take them instead. Meanwhile, Scrooge closes McDuck Manor for Halloween, so Della and Donald spend the evening with Launchpad, who has grown up believing that Halloween is an annual curse that he brought upon the world. After attacking a costumed Scrooge, Launchpad decides to return to the haunted house where his troubles began and break the "curse". Just as the monsters surround the kids, Launchpad appears and assaults the former with Donald, Della, and Scrooge in tow. When Launchpad realizes his folly and the monsters are impressed with his "trick", everyone reconciles. Huey decides that the evening can still be salvaged by opening up McDuck Manor so that all concerned can enjoy "free" candy.
58	11	"The Forbidden Fountain of the Foreverglades!"	Tanner Johnson	Story by : Francisco Angones, Madison Bateman, Colleen Evanson, Christian Magalhaes, Ben Siemon & Bob Snow; Teleplay by : Bateman; Storyboarded by : Vince Aparo, Kristen Gish & Victoria Harris	October 12, 2020	312	0.17
Whilst searching for a Missing Mystery called the Fountain of the Foreverglades, which can give and take youth, Scrooge comes across Goldie, who also seeks it, and a race ensues, during which they become young again after being exposed to its waters. Upon reaching it however, they are confronted by Rockerduck, who extended his life with cryogenics, joined F.O.W.L., and now seeks the Fountain, but finds it empty. Meanwhile, the boys rest at a hotel, during which Dewey inexplicably becomes older and usurps Huey as the "big brother" while Louie discovers the owner is actually Ponce de León, who put the Fountain's water in the hotel pool to steal youth from guests. León captures the boys, but Scrooge and Goldie come to their rescue. During the subsequent fight, Rockerduck regains his youth, but flees after his butler, Jeeves, is turned into a baby while Scrooge and Goldie return to normal and León ages to dust. Afterward, Dewey and the guests are returned to normal while Goldie and Scrooge spend quality time together.
59	12	"Let's Get Dangerous!" (Note: This episode is a one-hour special. When aired as two half-hour episodes, the first part is titled "Part I: The St. Canardian Guardian!" and the second part is titled "Part II: A Case of Mistaken Reality!".)	Matthew Humphreys & Jason Zurek	Story by : Francisco Angones, Madison Bateman, Colleen Evanson, Christian Magalhaes, Ben Siemon & Bob Snow; Teleplay by : Angones & Evanson; Storyboarded by : Matt Carbonella, Hayley Foster, Stephanie Gonzaga, Victoria Harris, Ben Holm, Diana Huh, Sam King, Kat Marusik, Rachel Paek, Stephan Park, Krystal Ureta, Brandon Warren & Jake Wyatt	October 19, 2020	313–314	0.10
Scrooge travels to St. Canard with Huey and Louie to invest in Dr. Taurus Bulba's Ramrod, a device that can seemingly create anything from nothing. Elsewhere, Launchpad and Dewey reunite with Drake, who is struggling with his superhero career. While on patrol though, they catch a little girl, Gosalyn Waddlemeyer, sneaking into Bulba's laboratory, who reveals that the Ramrod was actually built by her missing grandfather. Meanwhile, the others discover that the device is actually a Missing Mystery called the Solego Circuit, which opens rifts to other dimensions. They then confront Bulba, who turns out to be a rogue F.O.W.L. agent, as he proceeds to summon supervillains from the Darkwing Duck TV show into the real world, and a fight ensues. Bradford tries to control the situation, but is forced to flee when F.O.W.L. is exposed. In the end, Gosalyn destroys the Ramrod, returning the villains, and Drake asks her to become his partner, with Launchpad joining as well.
60	13	"Escape from the ImpossiBin!"	Tanner Johnson	Story by : Francisco Angones, Madison Bateman, Colleen Evanson, Christian Magalhaes, Ben Siemon & Bob Snow; Teleplay by : Siemon; Storyboarded by : Vince Aparo, Kristen Gish, Victoria Harris & Ben Holm	October 26, 2020	315	0.13
After learning that Bradford, who was his business partner, is the leader of F.O.W.L., Scrooge installs a new security system into the Money Bin and challenges Louie and Della to beat it. However, Bradford and Gandra, who is revealed to be an F.O.W.L. agent, hack it and trap them inside, forcing them to escape for real. Ultimately, they make it through and Louie assures Scrooge they can beat F.O.W.L. the same way they always do: as a family. Meanwhile, Beakley and Webby try to train the others to fight off F.O.W.L., but they take things too far and eventually realize the error of their ways. Afterward, the family discovers that the attack on the Bin was a distraction while F.O.W.L. agents stole all of the Missing Mysteries they had found. In response, the Ducks vow to find the remaining ones before F.O.W.L. does.
61	14	"The Split Sword of Swanstantine!"	Matthew Humphreys	Story by : Francisco Angones, Madison Bateman, Colleen Evanson, Christian Magalhaes, Ben Siemon & Bob Snow; Teleplay by : Magalhaes & Snow; Storyboarded by : John Conway, Hayley Foster, Stephanie Gonzaga, Ben Holm, Krystal Ureta & Brandon Warren	November 2, 2020	316	0.13
Scrooge and the kids, plus Lena and Violet, travel to Istanbird to find a Missing Mystery called the Split Sword of Swanstantine before F.O.W.L. does. However, Scrooge gets into a fight with Heron, leaving the kids to find the pieces. Dewey and Webby race Gandra to the hilt and, despite being temporarily blinded by a flash bomb, beat her by relying on their instincts. Meanwhile, Louie and Violet win the crossguard in an eating contest against Rockerduck hosted by spice baron Christoph. Finally, Huey and Lena find the blade. Despite being confronted by Steelbeak, the former fights him off by channeling his inner rage. As the family reunite, the sword magically reassembles itself and empowers them. Outmatched, the F.O.W.L. agents flee, though they secretly succeed in procuring one of Webby's feathers.
62	15	"New Gods on the Block!"	Jason Zurek	Story by : Francisco Angones, Madison Bateman, Colleen Evanson, Megan Gonzalez, Christian Magalhaes, Ben Siemon & Bob Snow; Teleplay by : Gonzalez; Storyboarded by : Sam King, Kat Marusik & Stephan Park	November 9, 2020	317	0.13
Following a failed adventure, Scrooge calls for additional help, causing the kids to think they are being replaced. Suddenly, the family is approached by Selene and Storkules, who reveal that Zeus was stripped of his godhood and that they are looking for a replacement. To cheer the kids up, Della convinces Selene to give them a shot, but it ends in disaster. Meanwhile, Storkules tries to help Donald during his date with Daisy, only to drive her away. Zeus then tricks Storkules into releasing a Titan to cause an uproar that will enable him to regain his powers, but it swallows the gods and the adults. In the end, the kids save everyone and Scrooge assures them he would never replace them while Donald makes amends with Daisy and Zeus steals back his powers and tries to claim the victory as his own, only to accidentally fall into the underworld.
63	16	"The First Adventure!"	Vince Aparo & Tanner Johnson	Story by : Francisco Angones, Madison Bateman, Colleen Evanson, Megan Gonzalez, Christian Magalhaes, Ben Siemon & Bob Snow; Teleplay by : Magalhaes; Storyboarded by : Aaron Austin, Aparo, Kristen Gish & Victoria Harris	November 16, 2020	318	0.16
In the 1960s, S.H.U.S.H. rejects Bradford's proposal of taking over the world to control and prevent chaos, prompting him to co-found F.O.W.L. with Heron. 30 years later, a semi-retired Scrooge is asked to take care of a young Della and Donald all while being tasked by S.H.U.S.H. with retrieving a Missing Mystery called the Papyrus of Binding, a magic parchment capable of making anything written on it real. Scrooge is forced to bring the kids along, though he gradually comes to respect them as they help him. However, Bradford and Heron follow them and steal the Papyrus before taking the kids hostage. Ultimately, Scrooge has the Papyrus make itself disappear, with the provision that only his heir can find it, though not before Bradford uses it to erase his involvement from the Ducks' memories. Afterward, Scrooge decides to resume his adventuring life and hires Bradford to manage his company in the meantime.
64	17	"The Fight for Castle McDuck!"	Matthew Humphreys	Story by : Francisco Angones, Madison Bateman, Colleen Evanson, Christian Magalhaes, Ben Siemon & Bob Snow; Teleplay by : Bateman; Storyboarded by : Hayley Foster, Stephanie Gonzaga, Krystal Ureta & Brandon Warren	November 23, 2020	319	0.17
While investigating the absence of the mists that once surrounded Castle McDuck, Scrooge is reunited with his sister, Matilda. However, they end up reigniting their sibling rivalry. Webby attempts to mend their familial relationship, but it becomes a family feud as Fergus and Downey get involved. Meanwhile, Huey and Louie search for the family treasure – a Missing Mystery called the Blessed Bagpipes of Clan McDuck, which can bring inanimate objects to life and vice versa. However, Phantom Blot and F.O.W.L. Egghead Pepper, who were responsible for draining the castle's magic, beat them to it and accidentally give life to statues of Clan McDuck's ancestors, who begin squabbling as well. Even the triplets start arguing after failing to retrieve the bagpipes. In the end, Webby reminds everyone of how wonderful family is and they all work together to drive off the F.O.W.L. agents and reclaim the bagpipes.
65	18	"How Santa Stole Christmas!"	Jason Zurek	Story by : Francisco Angones, Madison Bateman, Colleen Evanson, Christian Magalhaes & Bob Snow; Teleplay by : Evanson; Storyboarded by : Sam King, Kathryn Marusik & Stephan Park	November 30, 2020	302	0.14
As the family is securing McDuck Manor against Santa Claus, with whom Scrooge is embroiled in a long-term feud, Santa approaches them with a broken leg and requests Scrooge's help in delivering presents, to which he agrees under the proviso that Santa never bothers him again. While helping them, Webby discovers the truth behind Scrooge's grudge: he and Santa invented the tradition of bestowing gifts on Christmas, but had a falling out when Scrooge refused to do so for free. As they finish delivering the presents, Webby and Santa learn Scrooge has actually been giving everyone coal and confront him. Santa confesses that he was never injured and that his goal was to have Scrooge embrace the magic of Christmas, while Scrooge admits he was wrong about the holiday. The two then reconcile and Scrooge calls in the rest of the family to deliver the real presents before sunrise.
66	19	"Beaks in the Shell!"	Jason Zurek	Story by : Francisco Angones, Madison Bateman, Colleen Evanson, Christian Magalhaes, Ben Siemon & Bob Snow; Teleplay by : Siemon; Storyboarded by : Emmy Cicierega, Sam King, Kathryn Marusik & Stephan Park	February 22, 2021	320	0.10
Fenton and Gandra maintain their relationship in secret while working on a virtual landscape called the "GizmoCloud". Huey discovers this and is initially horrified to learn that Fenton is dating a F.O.W.L. agent. When Gandra explains that her true loyalties do not lie with F.O.W.L., Huey agrees to keep their secret, and tries to protect it from both Officer Cabrera and Gyro, who have grown suspicious of Fenton's behavior. Meanwhile, Beaks' popularity continues to dwindle, so he decides to steal Gizmo-tech again. When he finds out about the GizmoCloud, he traps Fenton and Gandra within it and takes control. Fenton uses Morse code to alert Huey, who recruits Gyro and Cabrera, and the five successfully overpower Beaks. Afterward, Gyro offers to help fix the GizmoCloud's glitches while Gandra is received warmly by Cabrera. Gandra vows to leave F.O.W.L. immediately so she can help Fenton launch the GizmoCloud, but Bradford rumbles her plans and orders his agents to take her to the "Lost Library".
67	20	"The Lost Cargo of Kit Cloudkicker!"	Tanner Johnson	Story by : Francisco Angones, Madison Bateman, Colleen Evanson, Johnson, Christian Magalhaes, Ben Siemon & Bob Snow; Teleplay by : Evanson & Johnson; Storyboarded by : Vince Aparo, Kristen Gish, Victoria Harris & Ben Holm	March 1, 2021	321	0.13
Years ago, Kit Cloudkicker jettisons a mysterious object bound for F.O.W.L. H.Q. from his aircraft during a clash with Karnage. In the present, Della teaches Dewey how to fly a plane before they and Huey meet with Kit to request his help in tracking down a Missing Mystery called the Stone of What Was. En route to the Stone, Dewey and Kit take a shine to one another before the gang encounters Karnage, who has been hired by F.O.W.L. to retrieve the stone. He and his crew find it first, but it transforms those who touch it into chimeric monsters. A bear / butterfly hybrid interrupts the battle for the Stone and flies away with it, with Della on its back. The others give chase, and Huey talks Dewey and Kit into doing what they do best: Dewey's piloting and Kit's cloud-kicking. The trio is able to save Della and acquire the Stone, though Karnage manages to procure a small fragment of it. Della is proud of Dewey for finally embracing his talent for flying while Kit is offered a job as a cloud-kicking sidekick to his old friend Molly Cunningham.
68	21	"The Life and Crimes of Scrooge McDuck!"	Matthew Humphreys	Story by : Francisco Angones, Madison Bateman, Colleen Evanson, Christian Magalhaes, Ben Siemon & Bob Snow; Teleplay by : Snow; Storyboarded by : Hayley Foster, Stephanie Gonzaga, Krystal Ureta & Brandon Waren	March 8, 2021	322	0.11
As Louie dodges responsibility for his latest scheme-gone-wrong, he and Scrooge are summoned to a mystical karmic court by Doofus, who seeks vengeance against Louie by suing Scrooge for allegedly creating his enemies. Glomgold, Ma Beagle, and Magica each present their case: Glomgold was overshadowed by Scrooge during an adventure, Ma Beagle's father lost the deed to Duckburg to Scrooge, and Magica's twin brother, Poe De Spell, was transformed into a raven during a battle with Scrooge, who refused to stop Poe from flying away. Louie counters the first two claims, but struggles with the third before realizing that he and Scrooge must take responsibility for their actions. However, while Louie makes amends with Doofus, the court interprets Scrooge's apology as an admission of guilt until Louie argues that his enemies shaped him as much as he shaped them, leading to Scrooge being acquitted of all charges.
69	22	"The Last Adventure!" (Note: This episode is a 90-minute special. When aired as three half-hour episodes, the first part is titled "Part I: A Tale of Three Webbys!", the second part is titled "Part II: The Lost Library of Isabella Finch!" and the third part is titled "Part III: Tales End...".)	Matthew Humphreys, Tanner Johnson, Matt Youngberg & Jason Zurek	Story by : Francisco Angones, Madison Bateman, Colleen Evanson, Christian Magalhaes, Ben Siemon & Bob Snow; Teleplay by : Angones, Bateman, Magalhaes, Siemon & Snow; Storyboarded by : Vince Aparo, Matthew Carbonella, Johnny Castuciano, Hayley Foster, Kristen Gish, Stephanie Gonzaga, Catherine Harman, Victoria Harris, Ben Holm, Sam King, Kathryn Marusik, Antony Mazzotta, Stephan Park, Krystal Ureta & Brandon Warren	March 15, 2021	323–325	0.20
While celebrating Webby's birthday, the family raids F.O.W.L.'s base at Funso's, only to find it deserted except for two clones of Webby, May and June. Taking them in, Webby becomes suspicious of her origins while Huey discovers the clones are F.O.W.L. agents sent to steal Finch's remaining Missing Mysteries. He and Webby follow them to the Lost Library of Alexandria but are discovered and captured. Bradford then tries to get Huey to join him by revealing he is Finch's grandson, but Huey refuses upon learning that he intends to rid the world of adventuring. Meanwhile, Webby discovers she is a creation of F.O.W.L. made using Scrooge's DNA to retrieve the Papyrus of Binding, codenamed April, but was rescued and taken in by Mrs. Beakley. The family come to Webby and Huey's rescue but are captured and Bradford forces Scrooge to sign an anti-adventuring contract with the Papyrus before turning on his agents, prompting May and June to free the Ducks. Together, they defeat Bradford using a loophole in the contract, as "family is the greatest adventure of all", destroying it. With F.O.W.L. defeated, the family continues with their adventures.

== Shorts overview ==
Online shorts	Episodes	Originally released	
Online shorts	Episodes	First released	Last released
Welcome to Duckburg!	6	June 9, 2017	June 16, 2017
30 Things	4	May 1, 2018	May 4, 2018
Webby Reacts	7	May 8, 2018	May 26, 2018
The World's Longest Deathtrap!	5	May 27, 2018	June 24, 2018
Fly	1	June 23, 2018	
Dewey Dew-Night!	4	July 8, 2018	July 29, 2018
Disney Theme Song Takeover	2	June 27, 2019	July 19, 2019
Top 4 Favorites	5	July 23, 2019	August 25, 2019
Disney Random Rings	2 (Note: There are actually several preexisting Disney Random Rings shorts. The ones listed feature characters from DuckTales.)	June 29, 2020	January 31, 2021
Chibi Tiny Tales	3 (Note: There are actually several preexisting Chibi Tiny Tales shorts. The ones listed feature characters from DuckTales.)	February 26, 2021	March 14, 2021
This Duckburg Life	7	March 29, 2021	May 10, 2021

== Online shorts ==
=== Welcome to Duckburg! (2017) ===
Released through the Disney XD YouTube channel ahead of the show's premiere, these shorts spotlight several characters.

No.	Title	Directed by	Written by	Original release date
1	"Donald's Birthday"	Unknown	Unknown	June 9, 2017
2	"Meet Scrooge!"	Unknown	Unknown	June 9, 2017
3	"Meet Huey!"	Unknown	Unknown	June 9, 2017
4	"Meet Launchpad McQuack!"	Unknown	Unknown	June 16, 2017
5	"Meet Mrs. Beakley!"	Unknown	Unknown	June 16, 2017
6	"Meet Webby Vanderquack!"	Unknown	Unknown	June 16, 2017

=== 30 Things (2018) ===
Recycling an idea used to promote the Disney Channel original movie Zombies, these shorts feature the kids listing off thirty things they like. Concurrent with the show's move from Disney XD to the Disney Channel, these and all subsequent shorts were released through the Disney Channel YouTube channel.

No.	Title	Directed by	Written by	Original release date
1	"30 Things with Huey"	Unknown	Unknown	May 1, 2018
2	"30 Things with Webby"	Unknown	Unknown	May 2, 2018
3	"30 Things with Dewey"	Unknown	Unknown	May 3, 2018
4	"30 Things with Louie"	Unknown	Unknown	May 4, 2018

=== Webby Reacts (2018) ===
These shorts are "reaction videos" featuring Webby watching another Disney Channel show.

No.	Title	Directed by	Written by	Original release date
1	"Webby Reacts To: Andi Mack" - "Bex's Secret"	Unknown	Unknown	May 8, 2018
2	"Webby Reacts To: Andi Mack" - "Ummm"	Unknown	Unknown	May 10, 2018
3	"Webby Reacts To: ZOMBIES"	Unknown	Unknown	May 12, 2018
4	"Webby Reacts To: Stuck in the Middle"	Unknown	Unknown	May 16, 2018
5	"Webby Reacts To: Raven's Home"	Unknown	Unknown	May 18, 2018
6	"Webby Reacts To: Descendants 2"	Unknown	Unknown	May 24, 2018
7	"Webby Reacts To: Descendants 3"	Unknown	Unknown	May 26, 2018

=== The World's Longest Deathtrap! (2018) ===
This five-part serial sees Webby, Dewey, Louie, Launchpad and Huey caught in an incredibly slow-moving deathtrap.

No.	Title	Directed by	Written by	Original release date
1	"The World's Longest Deathtrap! Part 1"	Unknown	Rachel Vine	May 27, 2018
2	"The World's Longest Deathtrap! Part 2"	Unknown	Rachel Vine	June 3, 2018
3	"The World's Longest Deathtrap! Part 3"	Unknown	Rachel Vine	June 10, 2018
4	"The World's Longest Deathtrap! Part 4"	Unknown	Rachel Vine	June 17, 2018
5	"The World's Longest Deathtrap! Part 5"	Unknown	Rachel Vine	June 24, 2018

=== Fly (2018) ===
This was a cross promotional short between Disney and electronic music producer Marshmello using his song "Fly", which he had previously released on March 8, 2018. The video was simultaneously aired on Disney Channel and released through Marshmello's YouTube channel.

No.	Title	Directed by	Written by	Original release date
1	"Fly"	Unknown	Unknown	June 23, 2018

=== Dewey Dew-Night! (2018) ===
Episodes of Dewey's home-made "Dewey Dew-Night!" talk show, as introduced in the episode "Day of the Only Child!"

No.	Title	Directed by	Written by	Original release date
1	"The Sidekick"	Tanner Johnson	Storyboarded by : Sam King; Written by : Rachel Vine	July 8, 2018
2	"The Interview"	Tanner Johnson	Storyboarded by : Sam King; Written by : Rachel Vine	July 15, 2018
3	"Will It Crash?!"	Tanner Johnson	Storyboarded by : Sam King; Written by : Rachel Vine	July 22, 2018
4	"Bedtime"	Tanner Johnson	Storyboarded by : Sam King; Written by : Rachel Vine	July 29, 2018

=== Disney Theme Song Takeover (2019) ===
As part of a promotional campaign, Disney Channel began airing the Disney Theme Song Takeover wherein supporting characters from different shows performed the theme song to the series they were in.

No.	Title	Directed by	Written by	Original release date
1	"Launchpad Theme Song Takeover"	Vince Aparo	Francisco Angones	June 27, 2019
2	"Glomgold Theme Song Takeover"	Tanner Johnson	Tanner Johnson	July 19, 2019

=== Top 4 Favorites (2019) ===
Huey, Dewey, Louie and Webby list off their 4 favorites of various subjects.

No.	Title	Directed by	Written by	Original release date
1	"Webby's Top 4 Disguises"	Unknown	Unknown	July 23, 2019
2	"Louie's Top 4 Treasures"	Unknown	Unknown	July 30, 2019
3	"Webby's Top 4 Monsters"	Unknown	Unknown	August 11, 2019
4	"Huey's Top 4 Tech"	Unknown	Unknown	August 18, 2019
5	"Dewey's Top 4 Quests"	Unknown	Unknown	August 25, 2019

=== Disney Random Rings (2020–21) ===
Short segments that originated from Big City Greens that feature Disney Channel characters calling one another and set to Adobe Flash animation.

No.	Title	Directed by	Written by	Original release date
17 (Note: Number represents its order in the Disney Random Rings series.)	"Baymax Helps Launchpad"	Unknown	Unknown	June 29, 2020
24	"Launchpad Calls Cricket"	Unknown	Unknown	January 31, 2021

=== Chibi Tiny Tales (2021) ===
Disney began releasing new shorts in the Chibi Tiny Tales series, itself loosely based on the Big Chibi 6 The Shorts series.

No.	Title	Directed by	Written by	Original release date
1	"Mayan Mayhem"	Unknown	Unknown	February 26, 2021
2	"Dime and Dash"	Unknown	Unknown	March 7, 2021
3	"Burrito Bash"	Unknown	Unknown	March 14, 2021
4	"Jungle Cruise x DuckTales"	Unknown	Unknown	November 19, 2022

=== This Duckburg Life (2021) ===
A podcast series that followed the series finale of DuckTales. A parody of This American Life, and to a certain extent Welcome to Night Vale, Huey Duck hosts a series where he interviews and narrates various strange happenings around Duckburg.

No.	Title	Directed by	Written by	Original release date
1	"Adventure Calls"	Sam Riegel	Megan Gonzalez, Ben Siemon, Matt Youngberg, Francisco Angones, Suzanna Olson, Madison Bateman, Christian Maghales, Bob Snow	March 29, 2021
While waiting to be picked up by Launchpad, Dewey and Louie get kidnapped for ransom by the Beagle Boys, with their story being told via a series of voicemails left on Launchpad's answering machine.
2	"Narratron 3000"	Sam Riegel	Jenna Hicks, Megan Gonzalez, Ben Siemon, Matt Youngberg, Francisco Angones, Suzanna Olson, Madison Bateman, Christian Maghales, Bob Snow	April 5, 2021
Huey meets up with Gyro for a demonstration of his latest invention, the Narratron 3000, a device able to read minds. However, the device gains sentience and attempts to take over Huey's body.
3	"Louie Sells Out"	Sam Riegel	Jenna Hicks, Megan Gonzalez, Ben Siemon, Matt Youngberg, Francisco Angones, Suzanna Olson, Madison Bateman, Christian Maghales, Bob Snow, David Wright	April 12, 2021
Huey wants to talk about the Duckburg Bark Beetle, but Louie bombards the podcast with advertisements. Note : This podcast was originally going to air online on April 19, 2021, but was moved up to April 12.
4	"Ghost Library"	Sam Riegel	Jenna Hicks, Ben Acker, Megan Gonzalez, Ben Siemon, Matt Youngberg, Francisco Angones, Suzanna Olson, Madison Bateman, Christian Maghales, Bob Snow, David Wright	April 19, 2021
Scrooge, Dewey, and Webby visit a library that only appears for thirteen minutes every one hundred years. Meanwhile, Huey interviews Miss Quackfaster about the library.
5	"The Framing of Flintheart Glomgold"	Sam Riegel	Jenna Hicks, Ben Acker, Megan Gonzalez, Ben Siemon, Jordan King, Matt Youngberg, Francisco Angones, Suzanna Olson, Madison Bateman, Christian Maghales, Bob Snow, David Wright, Ben Thomas, Carolyn Walch	April 26, 2021
After a shiver of sharks are droned in to sabotage Scrooge's new water park, Glomgold is instantly declared the culprit. However, Huey receives a phone call from an imprisoned Glomgold, who declares his innocence. In response, Huey decides to investigate the claim. Note : This podcast was originally going to air online on April 19, 2021, but was pushed back to April 26 and replaced with "Ghost Library".
6	"Out to Lunch"	Sam Riegel	Jenna Hicks, Ben Acker, Megan Gonzalez, Ben Siemon, Jordan King, Matt Youngberg, Francisco Angones, Suzanna Olson, Madison Bateman, Christian Maghales, Bob Snow, Aaron Brown, Julia Pleshette, David Wright, Leona Beckett, Ben Thomas, Carolyn Walch, W. Stuart Jones	May 3, 2021
Huey follows a day in the life of Launchpad when the latter's favorite burrito restaurant is replaced by a sushi place.
7	"Beagle Day"	Sam Riegel	Gino Guzzardo, Dan Siegel, Joe Crowley, Jenna Hicks, Ben Acker, Megan Gonzalez, Ben Siemon, Sam Riegel, Mark Kondracki, Jordan King, Ethan Grafton, Kayla Egan, Aaron Drown, Julia Pleasants, David Wright, Leonna Beckert, Dawn Connors, Carolyn Roach, Collette Weinberger, Tim Moen, W. Stuart Jones, John Royer, and Shawn Lemonnier	May 10, 2021
When the Beagle Boys steal Scrooge's top hat, in which he keeps the deed to Duckburg, Louie and Webby infiltrate their Beagle Day celebration to retrieve it. Meanwhile, Huey interviews Beagle expert Professor Barksley for information about Beagle Day traditions.

== Ratings ==
DuckTales (2017 TV series) : U.S. viewers per episode (thousands)

Season	Episode number																								Average
Season	1	2	3	4	5	6	7	8	9	10	11	12	13	14	15	16	17	18	19	20	21	22	23	24	Average
1	280	340	400	410	380	340	320	290	390	780	870	1090	780	680	820	670	710	630	730	670	700	730	720	–	600
2	580	600	520	550	570	530	610	330	320	260	360	330	430	410	340	390	220	300	250	210	240	230	250	170	380
3	190	190	140	130	160	180	170	110	170	160	170	100	130	130	130	160	170	140	100	130	110	200	–		150

Audience measurement performed by Nielsen Media Research

Viewership and ratings per season of List of DuckTales (2017 TV series) episodes
Season	Episodes	First aired		Last aired		Avg. viewers (millions)
Season	Episodes	Date	Viewers (millions)	Date	Viewers (millions)	Avg. viewers (millions)
1	23	August 12, 2017	0.28	August 18, 2018	0.72	0.60
2	24	October 20, 2018	0.58	September 12, 2019	0.17	0.38
3	22	April 4, 2020	0.19	March 15, 2021	0.20	0.15

== Reception ==
- The first season of the show received generally positive acclaim. As of December 2018, it had 2.89 million views on the Disney website and holds a current rank of 89%.
- The second season also received positive acclaim like its predecessor. Episodes such as the Della Duck arc were critically acclaimed. As of October 2019, it had 3.06 million views on the Disney website and holds a rank of 90%.
- The third season received critical acclaim. "The Last Adventure!" was its most-watched episode. As of March 2021, it had 5.12 million views and has a rank of 98%.
