= Universal solvent =

Universal solvent may refer to:

- Water, described as the "universal solvent" for its ability to dissolve many substances
- Alkahest, a substance once sought by alchemists, thought to be able to dissolve every other substance
- The Universal Solvent, a comic by Don Rosa
