= List of DuckTales episodes =

List of DuckTales episodes may refer to

- List of DuckTales (1987 TV series) episodes
- List of DuckTales (2017 TV series) episodes
