= Suspended animation in fiction =

Theme in science fiction

Suspended animation in fiction refers to the temporary cessation of life processes experienced by fictional characters, followed by their subsequent revival. This process is commonly employed as a plot device in science fiction narratives. It is frequently utilized to transport a character from the past to the future, a form of forward-only time travel, or to facilitate interstellar travel, which necessitates an extended journey for months or years, referring to space travel in fiction. In addition to accomplishing the character's primary objective in the future, they often encounter the unfamiliarity of a new world, which may bear only faint resemblance to their previous surroundings. On occasion, a character is portrayed as possessing skills or abilities that have become lost to society during their period of suspension, enabling them to assume a heroic role in their new temporal setting.

== Mechanisms ==
The methods employed for the suspension and subsequent revival of characters can vary greatly. In early stories, a general approach involves the use of magical enchantments that induce a prolonged slumber. In contrast, many modern narratives aim to present the concept as scientific suspended animation or cryonics, often simplifying and disregarding most of the intricacies involved. Within numerous science fiction settings, the challenges associated with contemporary cryonics are overcome prior to the development of faster-than-light travel, making it a viable means of interstellar transportation. In fictional renditions, the cells typically remain viable, and the revival process is depicted as straightforward or even spontaneous. Accidental freezing scenarios are prevalent in many stories, with technobabble utilized to rationalize how the characters managed to survive the process.

== Terms ==
Various terms are employed to describe the state of suspended animation, including cryosleep, hypersleep, hibernation, and soma.

=== Corpsicle ===
The term "corpsicle" is utilized in science fiction to describe a deceased body that has been cryopreserved through cryonics. It is a combination of the words "corpse" and "popsicle." The earliest known printed usage of this term in its current form can be traced back to science fiction author Frederik Pohl's book The Age of the Pussyfoot in 1969, where a corpsicle is depicted as "a zombie frozen in Alaska." An earlier variation of the term, "corpse-sicle," also credited to Pohl, appeared in the essay "Immortality Through Freezing," published in the August 1966 issue of Worlds of Tomorrow. Author Larry Niven also employed the term in his 1971 short story "Rammer" and later expanded it into the novel A World Out of Time (1976). In Niven's work, the protagonist awakens in a society that denies any legal rights to corpsicles. Ben Bova also incorporates the term in his 2001 novel The Precipice, where numerous subjects have been cryonically preserved, but upon revival, they have lost all their memories. In cinema, the term appears in Paul W. S. Anderson's film Event Horizon (1997), although it is used to refer to frozen remains with no possibility of revival.

== Literature ==
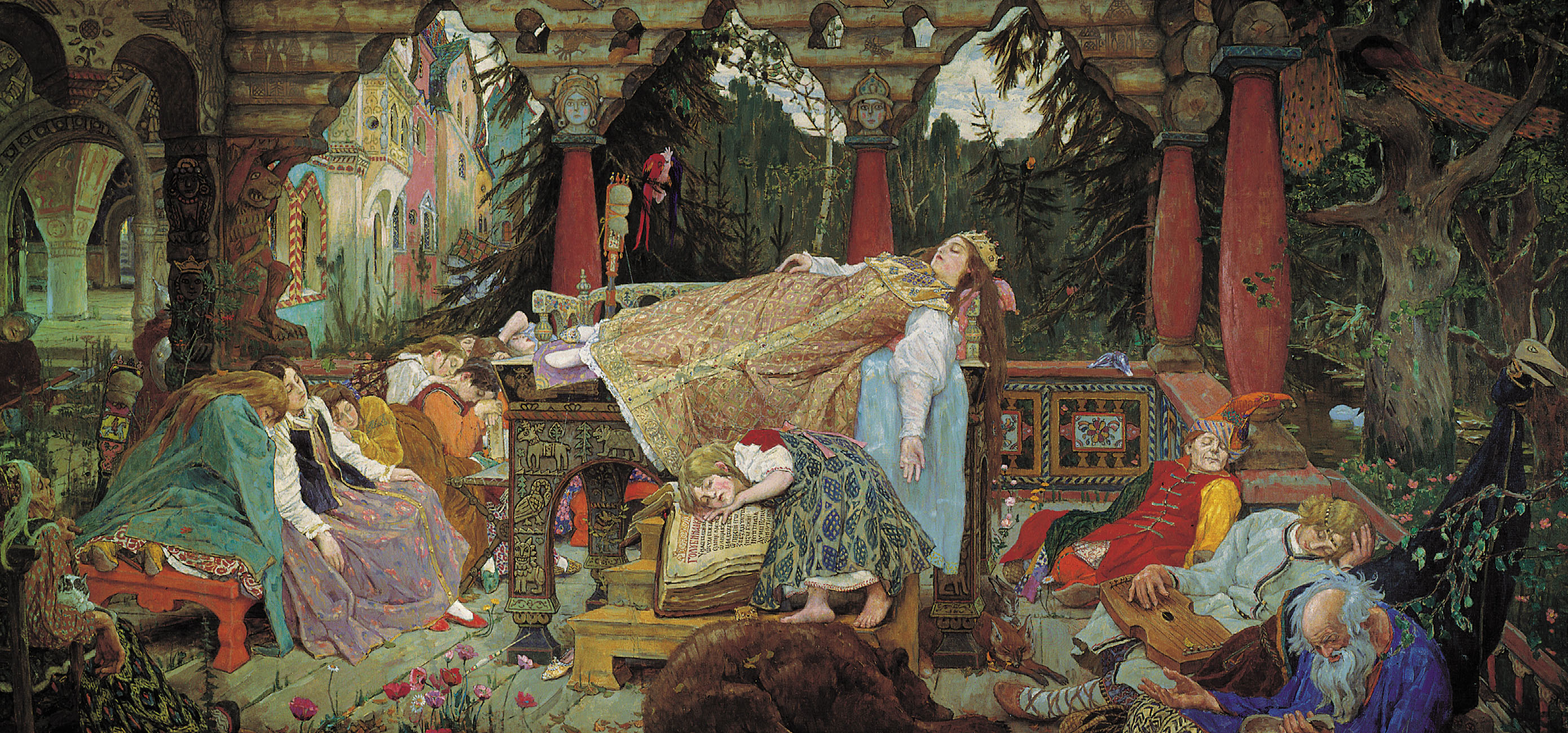
A depiction of Sleeping Beauty where the kingdom undergoes magical suspended animation for 100 years (by Viktor Mikhailovich Vasnetsov).

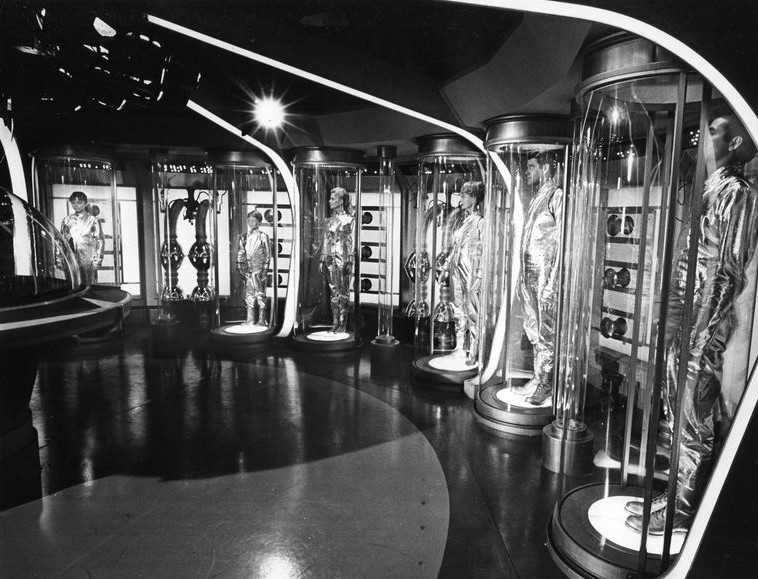
A 1965 press photo of actors portraying the Robinson Family being placed in suspended animation for their space voyage in Lost in Space.

Suspended animation often plays a role in stories about kings or heroes who are believed to be slumbering or kept alive until they are needed to confront great dangers. Examples include Holger Danske and King Arthur in mountain sleep tales.

In the fairy tale of Sleeping Beauty, an evil fairy places a curse on a princess, causing her to sleep for 100 years until she is awakened by a king's son. To ensure that the princess does not wake up alone and frightened, the good fairy uses her wand to put everyone in the palace, including humans and animals, into a state of sleep.

In yet another fairy tale, the fairy tale of "Snow White", suspended animation appears once again when the wicked stepmother of the heroine poisons Snow White with a cursed apple out of jealousy after many previous attempts on her life (the huntsman, a bodice lace and a poisoned comb). The seven dwarfs refuse to bury her in the cold ground and place her body in a glass coffin, mourning her until she is eventually found and awakened by a travelling prince.

Shakespeare's works, such as Romeo and Juliet and Cymbeline, incorporate plot devices involving a drug that induces a state of suspended animation resembling death.

In American fiction, one of the earliest stories involving suspended animation is "Rip Van Winkle," a short story written by American author Washington Irving in 1819. The tale revolves around a British individual in the American colonies who stumbles upon fairies in the Catskill Mountains and consumes their moonshine. As a result, he falls into a 20-year slumber and awakens to find his village and country dramatically transformed due to the passage of time. This story has since become a prototype for narratives exploring social displacement.

=== Mentions in science fiction literature ===
In the 19th century, a number of science fiction short stories featuring suspended animation, both deliberate and accidental, include Mary Shelley's "Rodger Dodsworth: The Reanimated Englishman" (written in 1826, published in 1863), Edgar Allan Poe's "Some Words with a Mummy" (1845), and Lydia Maria Child's "Hilda Silfverling, A Fantasy" (1845). Edward Bellamy's "Looking Backward" and Jack London's "A Thousand Deaths" (1899) also explore the theme.

Moving into the 20th century, science fiction stories featuring suspended animation include V. Mayakovsky's Klop (1928), H.P. Lovecraft's "Cool Air" (1928), and Edgar Rice Burroughs's "The Resurrection of Jimber-Jaw" (1937).

The character of Buck Rogers was introduced in the August 1928 issue of Amazing Stories. In the novella Armageddon 2419 A.D., Buck Rogers, a World War I veteran, becomes trapped in a mine and is preserved for 500 years by mine gasses. This concept continued in the 1930s radio show Buck Rogers in the 25th Century and subsequent film and television adaptations.

John W. Campbell Jr.'s 1938 novella Who Goes There? features a malevolent alien creature that crashed into Earth's polar regions and was frozen for millennia. The creature is inadvertently revived by human explorers in the 20th century, leading to a suspenseful story that inspired the 1951 film The Thing From Another World and its remakes.

While many early stories depict unwilling subjects in suspended animation, Neil R. Jones' 1931 short story "The Jameson Satellite" explores deliberate cryopreservation after death, laying the groundwork for the concept of cryonics. Arthur C. Clarke incorporates suspended animation in works such as Childhood's End (1953), The Songs of Distant Earth (1986), and the Space Odyssey series (1968–1997) to enable interstellar travel. In Clarke's 3001: The Final Odyssey, the character Frank Poole is cryopreserved in space and revived a thousand years later.

In 1964, Captain America, a comic book superhero popular in the 1940s, was reintroduced, explaining his absence by accidentally freezing in the Arctic ice pack.

Frederik Pohl's science fiction work The Age of the Pussyfoot (1966–1969) tells the story of a man revived from cryopreservation in the year 2527, having died in a fire 500 years earlier.

The Ice People (1968) by René Barjavel is about the discovery of an advanced pre-historical civilization buried under the ice of Antarctica, with two representatives in suspended animation.

In the 1969 novel Freezing Point by Anders Bodelsen, the main character is frozen down in 1973 and wakes up in 1995 when his cancer can be cured, and is confronted with a new society obsessed with life extension.

James L. Halperin's national best-seller The First Immortal (1998) delves deeply into cryonics in a contemporary setting. Giles Milton's thriller The Perfect Corpse (2014) is set in a fictional cryonics laboratory and revolves around the resurrection of a perfectly frozen body found in the Greenland ice sheet.

In Greg Bear's War Dogs (2014), in contrast to cryogenic sleep, a "Warm Sleep", in a greenish gel, is used to transport soldiers in an interstellar war.

== Film ==
Movies featuring suspended animation include A Long Return (1975), Late for Dinner (1991), Forever Young (1992), Demolition Man (1993), Idiocracy (2006), Realive (2016), Sexmission (1984), the Woody Allen comedy Sleeper (1973), and Open Your Eyes (Abre los Ojos) (1997), which was remade as Vanilla Sky (2001).

The 1939 movie serial Buck Rogers and its 1979 remake Buck Rogers in the 25th Century depict the title character entering suspended animation during the 20th century and awakening in a vastly different future. In the 1939 version, Buck Rogers and his sidekick Buddy Wade intentionally preserve themselves using experimental "Nirvano Gas" after their dirigible crashes over the North Pole. In the 1979 version, Buck Rogers, an astronaut, inadvertently enters suspended animation when his spacecraft encounters a space phenomenon, only to be discovered centuries later in 2491.

The 1984 film Iceman revolves around a prehistoric man who is revived after being frozen for 40,000 years, while the 1992 film Encino Man uses a comedic approach to the same concept. Both movies depict prehistoric individuals being naturally flash-frozen without any special preparation and thawing without lasting damage to their physical or mental abilities. In Iceman, scientists theorize that something in the caveman's diet acted as a natural antifreeze, preventing cell crystallization.

Suspended animation, referred to as "cryosleep", "hypersleep", or "hibernation", is used during space travel in films such as 2001: A Space Odyssey (1968) and its sequel 2010: The Year We Make Contact (1984), Planet of the Apes (1968), Alien (1979) and its sequels and prequels, Pitch Black (2000), James Cameron's Avatar (2009), Pandorum (2009), Christopher Nolan's Interstellar (2014), and Morten Tyldum's Passengers (2016).

In The Empire Strikes Back (1980), Han Solo is temporarily frozen to demonstrate the concept of suspension, which serves as a means of restraining prisoners for travel.

The Austin Powers films (1997, 1999, 2002) use suspended animation to transport Austin Powers, a 1960s spy character, and his arch villain, Dr. Evil, to the future, highlighting the contrast in their behavior and expectations.

In the Marvel Cinematic Universe, Steve Rogers and Bucky Barnes undergo suspended animation. During World War II, Rogers is frozen in the Arctic after his plane crashes, while Barnes falls off a train during a mission. They are both presumed dead before being found, with Rogers awakening in the 21st century and joining the Avengers, while Barnes is found by the Hydra wing of the Soviet Union shortly after the fall and brainwashed, becoming the Winter Soldier. During the 20th century, Hydra uses the Winter Soldier as an assassin, with him surviving to the present day by being placed in suspended animation between missions; following Captain America: Civil War (2016), Barnes is placed in suspended animation again in Wakanda until his recovery in Black Panther (2018).

In the 1943 movie serial Batman, the character Prince Daka uses suspended animation on a corpse to receive a message from Emperor Hirohito, featured in the chapter titled "The Living Corpse".

== Television ==
On television, suspended animation has been featured in various shows since the 1960s. In the original Twilight Zone episode "The Rip Van Winkle Caper" (1961), a band of thieves utilizes suspended animation. The concept is prominently showcased in the opening episode of the 1965 space adventure series Lost in Space, where a family of space travelers undergoes suspended animation for a five and a half-year journey to the star Alpha Centauri. The original Star Trek series episode "Space Seed" (1967) involves the discovery of 72 humans adrift in space, preserved in a state of suspended animation, led by Khan Noonien Singh, portrayed by Ricardo Montalbán. Khan's character returns in the 1982 film Star Trek II: The Wrath of Khan, and a similar storyline is used in Star Trek Into Darkness (2013), with Benedict Cumberbatch as Khan. The 1970s television series Buck Rogers in the 25th Century changed the origin story of its main character, depicting him as an astronaut frozen during a deep space mission for 500 years due to a life support system failure.

The 1973 TV movie Genesis II, created by Gene Roddenberry, shares a similar premise with Buck Rogers. It follows the story of fictional NASA scientist Dylan Hunt, who volunteers for a suspended animation test but awakens in the year 2133 in a post-apocalyptic world after an earthquake traps him underground.

In TV shows such as L.A. Law (1990), Picket Fences (1994), and Boston Legal (2005), producer David E. Kelley presents well-researched portrayals of cryonics. These shows depict dying individuals seeking the right to elective cryopreservation before death. Cryonics is also featured in an episode of Castle titled "Head Case," where the investigation is complicated by a cryonics company recovering the murder victim's body before the police can examine it.

In the Star Trek: The Next Generation episode "The Neutral Zone" (1988), the protagonists criticize cryonics despite its success in their fictional world, considering it a primitive concept rooted in the fear of death. The comedy series Red Dwarf (1988) and Futurama (1999) use accidental long-term suspended animation as a plot device to transport contemporary characters Dave Lister and Philip J. Fry, respectively, into the distant future. The Australian series Silversun (2004) revolves around 550 people undergoing cryonic suspension for a 90-year journey to the planet Silversun. The Spanish soap opera Aurora (2010) centers around the theme of suspended animation, with the protagonist being frozen for 20 years before coming back to life and facing a changed world.

In the 14th episode of Batman: The Animated Series entitled "Heart of Ice" (1992), the character Mr. Freeze has his dying wife Nora Fries in suspended animation to preserve her so she can be cured of her illness in the future.

In Star Trek: Voyager, the crew encounters aliens who placed themselves in suspended animation to escape a solar flare in the episode "The Thaw" (1996). In the episode "One," the Voyager crew enters stasis pods to survive a radiation-filled nebula, while in "Dragon's Teeth" (1999), the crew revives a warlike alien race, the Vaadwaur, 900 years after their suspension.

The 1999 South Park episode "Prehistoric Ice Man" mocks the difficulties of adjusting to the future by depicting a man who was frozen for 32 months, but struggles to adapt to the changes in fashion and music. The episode "Go God Go" features Eric Cartman freezing himself to wait for the release of the Nintendo Wii, only to end up far in the future.

In Doctor Who, Time Lords can voluntarily enter a suspended state, which allows brief survival without oxygen and may be mistaken for death. In the serial "Destiny of the Daleks," the Fourth Doctor's companion Romana enters suspended animation after being captured by the Daleks, enabling her to escape. The concept is central to the 1985 serial "Revelation of the Daleks," where suspended bodies are used to create a new race of Daleks.

The season finale for the first season of Clone High (2003), "Changes: You Got A Prom Wit Dat?", saw the main characters cryogenically frozen in a freezer. The first episode of the series' second season/2023 revival saw most of the clones being thawed out with a hair dryer 20 years later, but they mistakenly believe that only a day has passed before being informed of the truth a few days later by their principal.

In the TV sitcom Mr. Meaty episode "Original Sin," the founder of the titular food chain cryogenically freezes himself in 1904 to continue his domination plan in the future before later being thawed out by protagonists Josh and Parker.

In the TV series The 100, during season 5, a group of prisoners is awakened from cryopreservation after over 100 years. They had been in suspended animation while Earth was temporarily uninhabitable, serving their sentences aboard a ship mining asteroids. Later, earthlings used cryopreservation to survive after an explosion destroyed the only habitable land on Earth. At the end of the fifth season, they find out that Earth did not recover fast enough, so they have instead been in cryopreservation for 125 years and traveled to another planet.

== Manga and anime ==
In the anime series Cowboy Bebop, one of the main characters, Faye Valentine, appears to be a young woman in her early twenties, but is actually around 77 years old. After a space shuttle accident, Faye is put into a cryogenic freeze for 54 years, which halts her aging process. When she awakens from cryogenic suspension, she finds herself in a world she does not understand, surrounded by people who claim to help her, but take advantage of her vulnerability. She suffers from total amnesia, and her real name and past remain a mystery that is gradually revealed throughout the series. Faye carries a significant amount of debt and has experienced betrayal, which has hardened her personality. She is implied to have come from Singapore and belonged to a wealthy family; memories and a video tape from her childhood show her living in a large mansion, and it is implied that the accident and cryogenic suspension were related to an orbital gate.

In the manga/anime InuYasha and its sequel InuYasha: The Final Act, the character Inuyasha, a half-demon, was sealed on the Sacred Tree of Ages for fifty years. The sealing arrow was fired by his lover, Priestess Kikyo, causing him to enter a deep sleep and preventing him from aging.

In the spinoff series Yashahime: Princess Half-Demon, which follows the events of InuYasha: The Final Act, Rin, an older character, is in a state of suspended animation and perpetual slumber within the Sacred Tree of Ages. This was done at the request of her demon lover, Sesshomaru, and she has remained in this state for a decade.

== Video games ==
Suspended animation is a recurring concept in various video games. For example, in the Halo series, it is used to prevent aging during long interstellar voyages.

In the Portal series, the protagonist, Chell, awakens from suspended animation.

Fallout 4 features the main protagonist, known as the Sole Survivor, who undergoes suspended animation through cryosleep as part of a Vault-Tec experiment in Vault 111.

In Mass Effect: Andromeda, the main protagonist, Pathfinder Ryder, along with other passengers on arks, are placed in cryosleep for a 600-year journey to colonize the Andromeda Galaxy.

In The Legend of Zelda: Breath of the Wild, the main protagonist, Link, is brought to the Shrine of Resurrection for healing after sustaining fatal injuries protecting Princess Zelda during the Great Calamity. After awakening from a century-long stasis without his memories, Zelda, in the form of a disembodied voice, guides Link on his quest to regain his memories and defeat Calamity Ganon.

In The Outer Worlds, the main protagonist is a space colonist placed in suspended animation during transportation to the Halcyon Colony. Due to unforeseen circumstances, the journey takes 70 years instead of the intended 10 years, and the colony's scientists are unable to unfreeze the colonists due to their extended time in suspended animation. Resuscitation efforts by a rogue scientist aim to disrupt the control of the Halcyon Holdings Company and save the other colonists trapped in suspended animation.

In Kirby and the Forgotten Land, the alien life-form dubbed specimen ID-F86 was held in suspended animation within the Eternal Capsule in Lab Discovera after it was captured by the research team and an accident occurred that resulted in it splitting in two. One half, Fecto Forgo, was kept within the capsule, while the other, Elfilin, escaped and became an ally of Kirby.

In the final mission of Perfect Dark, Battle Shrine, the protagonist, Joanna Dark, recognizes that the Skedar aliens are in a state of suspended animation, and they must be killed as a part of an objective.

In the Sonic the Hedgehog series, Shadow the Hedgehog is placed into suspended animation after being deemed a threat by the military organization Guardian Units of Nations (G.U.N.). Fifty years later, during the events of Sonic Adventure 2, he is freed by Doctor Eggman.

In Helldivers 2, the playable characters summoned in-game use a form of suspended animation to travel between star systems, even though it is shown that most vessels in that game are capable of faster than light travel.

Between the events of Kingdom Hearts: Chain of Memories and Kingdom Hearts II, Sora, along with Donald and Goofy, are placed into suspended animation for a year so that Naminé can restore their lost memories; Sora awakens after Roxas rejoins with his heart at the cost of his own existence.

== Music ==
Suspended animation and cryonics can sometimes play into music, typically in heavy metal.

- The US thrash metal band Slayer has a song titled "Crionics" from their album Show No Mercy.
- The Austrian death metal band Pungent Stench has a song titled "Suspended Animation" from their album, For God Your Soul... For Me Your Flesh.

== See also ==
- Chuanyue – Chinese fantasy about crossing into another era
- Dream world – Fantasy about worlds accessed through dreams
- Immortality in fiction – Immortality applied as an element in works of fiction
- Isekai – Japanese fantasy subgenre about travel to another world
- Sleeper ship – Hypothetical type of crewed starship
- Stasis field – Area of space time is stopped
- Time travel in fiction – Concept and accompanying genre in fiction
