= Del Monte note =

Misprinted US banknote

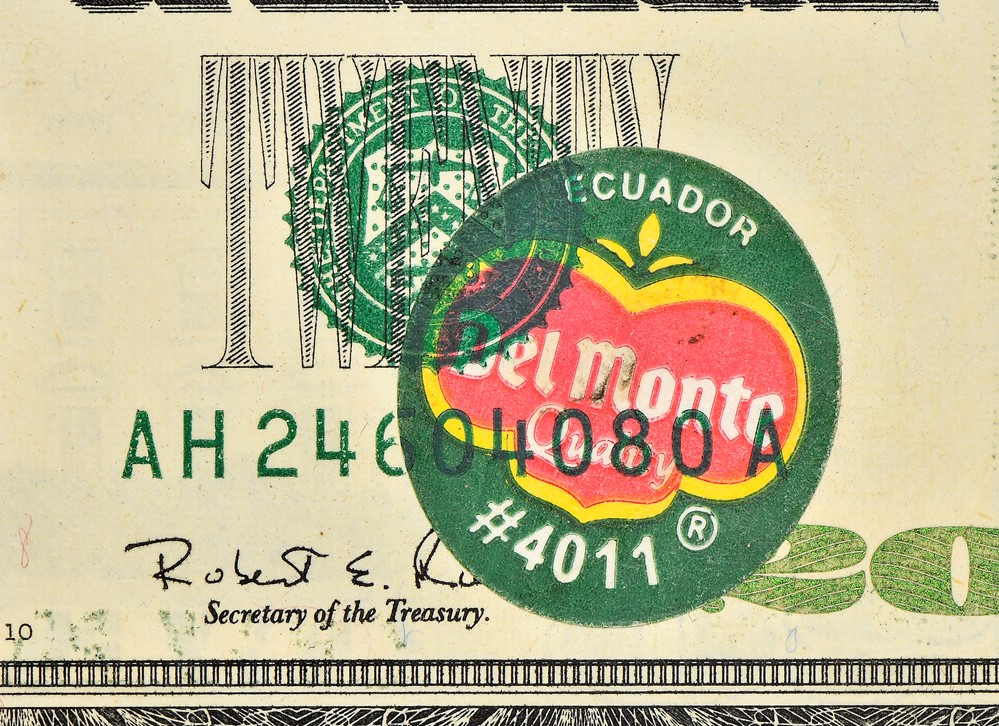
Closeup of the overprinted Del Monte sticker

The Del Monte note is a misprinted 1996 U.S. twenty-dollar bill on which a multicolored Del Monte sticker appears next to Andrew Jackson's portrait. The sticker became affixed during the printing process, before the application of the overprint but after the face print had been made. The result is a note with part of the seal and serial numbers printed on top of the sticker. In the paper money hobby, this error type is called a "retained obstruction." The vast majority of such errors do not retain the source of the obstruction but those that do sell for a substantial premium. The note is very famous among currency collectors and has appeared on the covers of industry magazines such as Bank Note Reporter and Numismatic News.

The Del Monte Note originated at the Fort Worth U.S. Treasury Department print facility. It was discovered by a college student in Ohio who received it from an ATM. The note had been preserved in uncirculated condition and was auctioned on eBay for US$10,100 in 2003. On January 6, 2006, the note was auctioned for US$25,300 by Heritage Auctions of Dallas, Texas. The note was certified by Paper Money Guaranty in 2020. On January 22, 2021, Heritage Auctions auctioned the note for $396,000, the highest sale price for any error banknote. Making it hold the Guinness World Record for most expensive error banknote.
