= The Black Knight (comics) =

Disney comics story

- Cover of the story. Art by Don Rosa.
- Story code: D 97346
- Story: Don Rosa
- Ink: Don Rosa
- Hero: Scrooge McDuck
- Pages: 24
- Layout: 4 rows per page
- Appearances: Scrooge McDuck; Donald Duck; Huey, Dewey and Louie; Little Helper
- First publication: 29 May 1998

"The Black Knight" is a 1998 Scrooge McDuck story by Don Rosa. This story was a sequel to Rosa's 1995 story "The Universal Solvent", and was likewise followed by "The Black Knight Glorps Again".

The story was first published in the Danish Anders And & Co. #1998-23; the first American publication was in Uncle Scrooge #314, in October 1998.

== Plot ==
French gentleman Arpin Lusène, notorious for his secret identity as Le Chevalier Noir ("The Black Knight"), the world's greatest cat burglar, comes to Duckburg to test his skills against Scrooge's Money Bin. Even with Scrooge and his nephews on high alert, the thief has little trouble entering into the bin and its innermost vault. As a souvenir of his triumph, he takes a few choice items from Scrooge's office.

At first, Arpin is disappointed as he examines his bounty: a suit of medieval armour, a bag of diamond dust (swept from the floor of a local jeweler), and a solid diamond jar filled with black goop. Upon closer examination, he identifies the goop as "Omnisolve", the universal solvent invented by Gyro Gearloose (and previously featured in "The Universal Solvent"). With some calculation, the Black Knight plans an even bolder assault on the money bin: by gluing the diamond dust to his suit of armor, he's able to coat the armor and sword (except for the palms of his gauntlets, the soles of his shoes, and the hilt of the sword) in the Omnisolve, allowing him to march into the bin in broad daylight.

None of Scrooge's security measures are able to stop the Black Knight, as the solvent instantly dissolves everything in its path, including bullets. When the Black Knight reaches the door of the vault, Scrooge challenges that he won't be able to steal all of McDuck's money at once. The Black Knight says that he will be satisfied simply dissolving all of Scrooge's money out of existence, thus creating the illusion that he did in fact manage to steal Scrooge's entire fortune. Desperate, Scrooge realizes how to defeat him: by pulling a rug out from under his feet and tipping him onto his back, where he falls down through the many floors of the bin.

Luckily for the Black Knight, his fall is broken by the contents of Scrooge's diamond vault, and the impact knocks him senseless. Scrooge and Co. gingerly remove him from the armor. The Black Knight graciously admits defeat, and agrees to leave the room handcuffed, presumably to be taken into police custody. However, he quickly escapes his cuffs and disappears, leaving a note promising to return one day.
