= Heritage Auctions =

American fine art and collectibles auction house

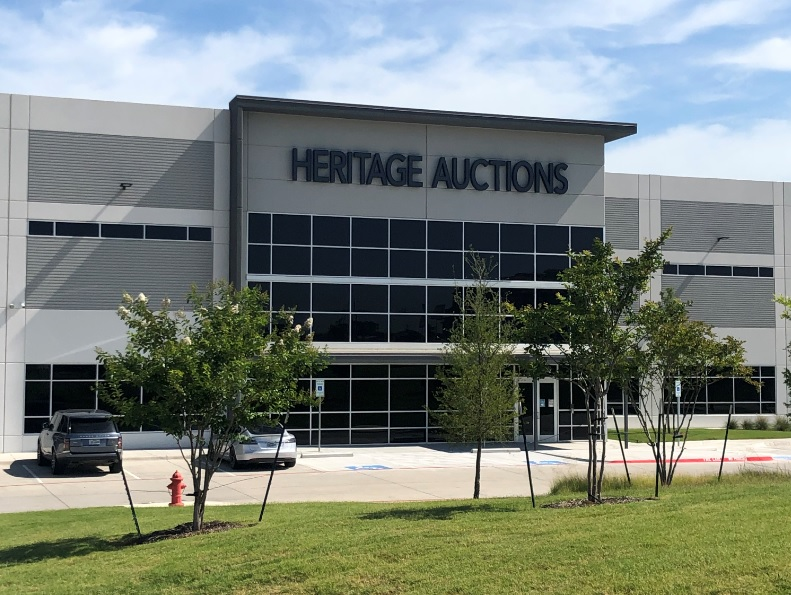
- Type: Private
- Founded: 1976; 50 years ago in Dallas, Texas, U.S.
- Founder: Steve Ivy (co-founder and CEO); Jim Halperin (co-founder)
- Headquarters: Dallas, Texas, U.S.
- Products: Antiques and collectibles
- Services: Auctioneer
- Website: ha.com

Heritage Auctions is an American multi-national auction house based in Dallas, Texas. Founded in 1976, Heritage is an auctioneer of numismatic collections, comics, fine art, books, luxury accessories, real estate, and memorabilia from film, music, history, and sports. The company has grown to become the world's third largest auction house by total sales.

== History ==
In 1982, Heritage Auctions became a partnership between two collectors, Steve Ivy and Jim Halperin. In 1967, Ivy dropped out of the University of Texas at Austin to form Steve Ivy Rare Coin Co. in Dallas, Texas. Ivy formed Heritage Auctions in Dallas in 1976.

In 1982, Halperin sold his Boston-based business and relocated to Dallas to join Ivy. Alongside him, he brought Marc Emory, a partner who oversees a segment of Heritage's European operations. Another addition to the company was Greg Rohan, who joined in 1986 and is now president. The company's other partners are Paul Minshull, Ryan Carroll, Todd Imhof, Cristiano Bierrenbach, Todd Hignite, Dustin Johnston, Joe Maddalena, Sarah Miller, Sam Spiegel and Ryan Carroll.

In 2003, the company introduced a memorabilia department, which hosted its inaugural auction valued at approximately $2 million.

In 2010, Heritage launched its luxury items division, which includes jewelry, handbags, and other accessories. In some instances, items from these auctions have sold for over $200,000. By 2013, the auction house was also auctioning modern and contemporary art including works by Pablo Picasso, Andy Warhol, Joan Mitchell, and Edward Ruscha.

In the immediate aftermath of the onset of the COVID-19 pandemic, the company's online sales amounted to $41 million. This figure accounted for approximately 10% of the entire previous year's annual online sales, which had reached $483 million in 2019. In the year 2022, Heritage accomplished sales over $1.45 billion. This figure does not include the charity auction organized by Heritage for Dmitry Muratov's Nobel Peace Prize, which brought $103.5 million; the entirety of these proceeds was directed towards UNICEF to support humanitarian initiatives for refugee relief.

In 2023 Heritage was ranked third among Western auction houses with total sales of $1.76 billion. In 2024, Heritage's annual total sales reached $1.867 billion, the highest recorded in its history.

In 2025, Heritage closed its annual sales with more than $2.15 billion, the company's fifth consecutive record-breaking year.

== Operations ==
On June 1, 2020, Heritage Auctions consolidated three Dallas-area locations to a new world headquarters in Dallas, located at the northwest corner of West Airport Freeway and Valley View Lane near Dallas Fort Worth International Airport. The 160,000 square foot facility is located in the DFW Airport international trade zone and will house 450 of the company's 600 employees. The company also has offices in New York City located on Park Avenue. Its New York operations are mostly geared towards the fine arts industry. Heritage has a West Coast location in Beverly Hills, California, located on Olympic Boulevard. In 2011, Heritage acquired Greg Martin Auctions in San Francisco, California, forming the auction house's division specializing in weapons and armament.

Heritage expanded operations by adding an office in Hong Kong in 2015. In spring 2017, the company formed a Florida branch with offices in Palm Beach. In January 2017, company opened an office in Chicago, also, opened a new London office in 2017.

In 2015 Heritage Auctions took over MPO located in IJsselstein, The Netherlands. Founded in 1988 as a coin and stamp fair organizer, Jacco Scheper and Huib Pelzer acquired the company in 1996 and three years later began auction operations. Through the merger with MPO Heritage Auctions also has a Belgium office located on the outskirts of Brussels in Zaventem.

As of 2025, Heritage Auctions has continued its international expansion, with new showrooms and offices in Tokyo and Munich opening in 2024, and plans announced for a forthcoming Canada branch.

== Notable auctions ==
- In March 2026, an ultra-rare PSA 9-graded Pikachu Pokémon Illustrator promo card was sold for $1,406,250.
- In December 2024 Heritage sold what was dubbed, "The Holy Grail of Hollywood Memorabilia" for $32,500,000. "The Wizard of Oz (MGM, 1939), Judy Garland "Dorothy Gale" Screen Matched Ruby Slippers."
- In November 2024, art collection of The Boy Scouts of America’s including Norman Rockwell paintings, was auctioned by Heritage to raise funds for the compensation of sex-abuse survivors as part of a bankruptcy settlement.
- Heritage, in partnership with HBO launched an event to auction more than 2,000 costumes, props, set decorations and other items used in Game of Thrones from October 10–12, 2024.
- In August 2024, Babe Ruth's called shot jersey was sold via Heritage Auctions for a record $24.12 million, making it the most expensive sports collectible in history, eclipsing the $12.6 million paid for a 1952 Topps baseball card of Mickey Mantle in 2022.
- In April 2024, 1938 Action Comics #1 featuring Superman's first appearance sold for $6 million, the most expensive comic book ever.
- Many rare coin price records were broken in the January 2024, Florida United Numismatist (FUN) auction, including the finest known example of an 1855 Kellogg & Co. $50 for $1.26 million, one of only two known examples of an 1860 Half Eagle for $1.14 million, and the finest known example of an 1851 Schultz & Co. Half Eagle which drew $1.02 million; thus was more than double the previous top price.
- A near-perfect copy of “The Amazing Spider-Man #1” sold for over $1.3 million in January 2024, breaking the issue's highest price record.
- In August 2023 Heritage concluded the auction of Harry W. Bass Jr. coins, achieving $83.6 million. The proceeds of the sale will benefit dozens of North Texas nonprofits supported by Bass’ foundation plus a $40 million gift to found the Harry W. Bass Jr. School of Arts, Humanities, and Technology at the University of Texas at Dallas.
- An X-wing fighter miniature built by Industrial Light & Magic and used in the original “Star Wars: Episode IV- A New Hope” (1977) sold for $3,135,000 in October 2023.
- In July 2023, Heritage sold a copy of the Declaration of Independence for $2,895,000. Printed in Massachusetts, only six copies of this broadside edition exist, and this is one of two in private hands.
- The original cover art for the first issue of Batman: The Dark Knight Returns by Frank Miller achieved US$2.4 million in June 2022, making it the most expensive mainstream American comic book cover art sold publicly. Published by DC Comics in February 1986, issue #1 follows the superhero’s return after retiring 10 years earlier.
- Frank Frazetta’s painting Dark Kingdom (1976) sold for $6 million at Heritage Auctions in June 2023, setting a new record for a Frazetta painting, and any original comic book or fantasy art. Dark Kingdom was first used as the cover of Karl Edward Wagner's 1976 novel Dark Crusade and as the album cover for Molly Hatchet's 1979 Flirtin' With Disaster.
- Heritage auctioned a 1952 Topps Mickey Mantle baseball card in August 2022, for $12.6 million, setting a new record.
- Russian journalist Dmitry Muratov's Nobel Peace Prize, sold to benefit refugees from Ukraine through UNICEF. The medal sold in June 2022, for US$103.5 million, the highest price ever for a Nobel medal.
- The original cover art for the first issue of Batman: The Dark Knight Returns achieved $2.4 million at a June 2022 Heritage Auctions sale, making it the most expensive American comic book cover art sold.
- In May 2022, an 1863 Liberty Double Eagle from The Bob R. Simpson Collection, the finest known example of ten to twelve remaining in all grades from a mintage of only 30 coins, more than doubled the previous auction record for this coin.
- An original poster promoting a 1953 Hank Williams concert in Canton, Ohio, on New Year's Day sold for a record $150,000 in May 2021, beating The Beatles as the world's most expensive concert poster ever sold at auction. Subsequently in April 2022, Heritage broke the record for the highest priced concert poster with a $275,000 sale of a Beatles 1966 Shea Stadium poster. The previous record of $150,000, a poster for Hank Williams' last scheduled performance, was set by Heritage the previous year, as well as the same price for a concert poster for the Beatles at Shea stadium All of those records were shattered in November 2022, when the poster for the concert that Buddy Holly was headed to when he died, sold for $447,000 to Jim Irsay
- In January 2022 a single sheet of original comic artwork from page 25 of Marvel Comics' Secret Wars No. 8, showing the first appearance of Spider-Man's black suit, sold at auction for a record $3.36 million.
- In December 2021 Heritage sold a first edition Harry Potter and the Philosopher's Stone for $471,000, a record for the book with a first printing of 500.
- A copy of Amazing Fantasy #15 graded CGC 9.6 sold by Heritage in September 2021 set an all-time record price paid for any comic book at $3.6M, surpassing the $3.25M paid for an Action Comics #1 CGC 8.5, the first appearance of Superman, in April 2021.
- An unopened copy of Nintendo's Super Mario 64 from 1996 sold at auction for $1.56 million on July 11, 2021, a new record for a video game. The previous record was an unopened copy of Nintendo's The Legend of Zelda, which sold two days earlier for $870,000.
- In May 2021, a game-worn jersey belonging to Michael Jordan from his sophomore season at the University of North Carolina was sold for $1.38 million, making it the most expensive Jordan jersey sold.
- The Joseph Christian Leyendecker painting Beat-up Boy, Football Hero, which appeared on the cover of The Saturday Evening Post, sold for a record $4.12 million on May 7, 2021.
- The Paramount Collection of world and ancient coins reached $41,941,592 on March 25–27, 2021, making it the most valuable world and ancient coins auction. The auction included a $2.28 million world record for the most expensive British coin ever sold at public auction.
- A signed Michael Jordan card fetched $1.44 million on February 4, 2021, making it the most expensive Jordan card ever sold at auction.
- On January 24, 2021, Heritage Auctions sold the world's most valuable gold coin, a 1787 New York-style Brasher Doubloon, for $9.36 million.
- A Pokémon First Edition Base Set Sealed Booster Box sold for a world record-setting $408,000 on January 17, 2021.
- A near-mint copy of Batman #1 from 1940 sold on January 14, 2021, for $2.22 million, setting a world record for a Batman comic book and the second most expensive comic ever sold at auction.
- A US $20 bill with a Del Monte sticker sold for $396,000 on January 5, 2021, becoming the most expensive error note sold.
- In December 2020, a Wayne Gretzky 1979–80 O-Pee-Chee rookie card sold for $1.29 million, becoming the most expensive hockey card sold at auction and the first to break the million-dollar barrier.
- In January 2019, a rare 1943 Lincoln cent sold at Heritage auction for $204,000. The copper coin was created in error in 1943, when copper was meant to be reserved for the war effort. An original 1930 ink-on-paper drawing from the first Tintin comic book, Tintin in the Land of the Soviets, was sold by Heritage Auctions in June 2019. On November 20, 2019, Blueberry Custard (1961) by Wayne Thiebaud sold at a Heritage auction for $3.225 million, the second highest price brought in for a piece by the artist from Sacramento, California. The next day a near-mint condition Marvel Comics #1 sold for $1.26 million, setting the record for the most expensive Marvel comic sold in a public auction.
- In a continuing series of auctions starting in 2018, Heritage Auctions is auctioning a collection of memorabilia from the estate of Neil Armstrong, who died in 2012. The event was the first ever auction of the astronaut's personal collection and is billed to coincide with the 50th anniversary of the first landing on the Moon in 1969. About 3,000 items were up for auction and, as of October 2019, the auctions have brought in about $12 million.
- A baseball-themed print by American illustrator Norman Rockwell was sold by Heritage Auctions in August 2017 for $1.6 million. The work was a study of Rockwell's Tough Call.
- In December 2015, an auction brought in more than $3 million for memorabilia from Sylvester Stallone's personal collection.
- In October 2011, Heritage auctioned the personal property and movie memorabilia of the actor John Wayne for $5.4 million. The beret he wore in The Green Berets fetched $179,250. The following month, a copy of Action Comics #1, previously owned by Nicolas Cage, sold for $2.16 million, beating the previous record price for the comic of $1.5 million.
- In December 2005, a 2003 Upper Deck Exquisite Collection dual logo man, All-NBA Access Pass Patch, of Hall of Famers Michael Jordan and Kobe Bryant was sold for $3,172,000.

== Legal disputes and provenance issues ==
- In 2012, Heritage Auctions offered for sale a nearly complete Tarbosaurus bataar skeleton, described in the auction catalogue as originating in Central Asia. The government of Mongolia sought to halt the sale, contending that the specimen had been illegally exported from Mongolia, where dinosaur fossils are state property. Heritage completed the auction on a conditional basis while the ownership dispute remained pending. The specimen was later seized by U.S. authorities and returned to Mongolia following federal forfeiture proceedings.
- In 2014, Heritage sued Christie's and three former employees in New York City, alleging that Christie's had induced members of Heritage's luxury-accessories department to breach their employment agreements and misappropriate trade secrets. Christie's described the claims as without merit. The litigation was resolved in 2018. Heritage filed a separate action against Christie's subsidiary Collectrium in 2016, alleging that Collectrium had copied data from Heritage’s website through automated web scraping. The federal case was referred to arbitration. In 2019, an arbitrator awarded Heritage approximately $1.8 million against Collectrium; claims against Christie's were dismissed, as were several of Heritage's claims against Collectrium.
- In 2020, Heritage auctioned Margaret Keane's painting Eyes Upon You. The painting was later identified as having been stolen in 1972. Following an FBI investigation, it was returned to the daughter of its former owner, and Heritage refunded the purchaser.
- In August 2021, YouTuber Karl Jobst alleged that Heritage and video-game grading company Wata Games had conflicts of interest and had helped inflate prices in the market for sealed video games. Heritage denied engaging in illegal conduct, and Wata denied the allegations.
- In August 2024, the Atlanta Braves sent Heritage a cease-and-desist letter disputing the provenance and authenticity of Hank Aaron memorabilia that Heritage planned to auction, including bases and home plate associated with Aaron's 715th home run. Heritage withdrew the items and sued the Braves, maintaining that its consignment and provenance disclosures were accurate. The parties later settled the dispute.
- In May 2026, Lee Mendelson Film Productions filed a copyright infringement lawsuit against Heritage Auctions in the United States District Court for the Southern District of New York. The complaint alleged that Heritage used Vince Guaraldi's composition "Linus and Lucy" in Facebook and Instagram posts promoting auctions of Peanuts collectibles without authorization. Heritage stated that it had not yet been served with or reviewed the complaint and would respond to the allegations when appropriate.
