= The Truth Machine =

1996 novel by James L. Halperin

- Title page for The Truth Machine (1996)
- Author: James L. Halperin
- Language: English
- Publisher: Random House
- Publication date: 1996
- Publication place: United States
- Followed by: The First Immortal

The Truth Machine (1996) is a science fiction novel by James L. Halperin about a genius who invents an infallible lie detector. Soon, every citizen must pass a thorough test under a Truth Machine to get a job or receive any sort of license. Eventually, people begin wearing them all the time, thus eliminating dishonesty in all parts of human interaction, and eliminating crime, terrorism and a great deal of general social problems.

== Plot ==
The novel primarily focuses on the life story of Randall Peterson "Pete" Armstrong, a child prodigy with total recall memory, whose entire life's outlook has been defined by the tragic murder of his younger brother, Leonard, by an ex-convict who was believed to be capable of committing violent crimes again, but could not be imprisoned any longer under the current law structure. Pete is committed to making a difference for humanity that will atone for his brother's death and help millions of others, too. In his first year at Harvard at the age 13, Pete is recruited to enroll in a small, but exclusive, class of the brightest and most agile students on campus. In that class, he meets people and establishes friendships that will further his identity. It is there that the idea of a 'truth machine' is conceived and Pete realizes that its existence is possible and that he could do it. The 'truth machine' would be a mechanism that would be 100% accurate in determining if a person was lying or telling the truth. It could help eliminate crime and dishonesty in general. As long as it is employed universally (and not just by government officials), the 'truth machine' could revolutionize humanity and take it to that next evolutionary step which would help it avert its coming self-destruction.

The protagonist places a back door in the book's otherwise infallible lie detector, allowing him to avoid detection when he repeats fragments of Walt Whitman's poem "O Captain! My Captain!" in his mind.

== Reception ==
The novel was originally self-published but eventually was picked up by Random House.

The novel was extremely popular for several years, rising to #2 on Amazon.com at one point and selling several hundred thousand copies worldwide. It is still in print. In 2005 it was announced that the book was in development as a major motion picture at Lions Gate.

== See also ==
- P300 (neuroscience)#Applications
