= The First Immortal =

1998 novel by James L. Halperin

- Language: English
- Published: 1998 Del Rey Books
- Publication place: United States
- Preceded by: The Truth Machine

The First Immortal (1998) is a novel by James L. Halperin about life of a man born in 1925 who dies in 1988 and is re-animated after a cryonics procedure. The novel spans 200 years and gives a futuristic account of the first immortal human. The novel explores the future prospects of cryonics, A.I., nanotechnology, and eternal life. It is the sequel to Halperin's earlier book, The Truth Machine.

The novel was optioned as a Hallmark Hall of Fame miniseries, but the miniseries was never produced.

== Reception ==
Susan Clairmont of The Hamilton Spectator, was critical, saying that the "writing is often overdone and littered with clichés". The Toronto Star's John North, on the other hand found novel to be "thought provoking" which provoked "chilling, page-turning tension".

It is recommended as an educational resource by the two major cryonics organizations, Alcor Life Extension Foundation and Cryonics Institute.
