= Land Beneath the Ground! =

- Story code: W US 13-02
- Story: Carl Barks
- Ink: Carl Barks
- Date: August 18, 1955
- Hero: Scrooge McDuck
- Pages: 27 (29)
- Layout: 4 rows per page
- Appearances: Scrooge McDuck; Donald Duck; Huey, Dewey and Louie; Terries and Fermies
- First publication: Uncle Scrooge #13; March 1956

"Land Beneath the Ground!" is a Scrooge McDuck comic book story that appeared in 1956 in the comic book Uncle Scrooge, written by Carl Barks.

== Plot ==
Worried about earthquakes damaging his money bin, Scrooge McDuck is determined to find out what causes them. Upon a suggestion by Donald, Scrooge has a shaft dug beneath his money bin to search for faults which might get cracked open by a tremor, but the miners are suddenly frightened away by voices coming from a gigantic cave. The next day, Scrooge, Donald, and his three grandnephews find strangely round, colorful rocks scattered around the mineshaft. They prepare to descend, but all of a sudden their minecarts are sabotaged, stranding them deep beneath the ground.

In the caverns below Duckburg, Scrooge and his nephews soon discover that the smooth "rocks" are really subterranean beings calling themselves Terries and Fermies who look like bowling balls with arms and a head, but no legs, and move around by rolling on the ground. The Terries and Fermies can hear radio broadcasts through certain magnetic rocks, which allowed them to learn English - with a southern accent - from listening to country music radio stations.

Terries cause earthquakes by rolling in massive groups of thousands against the giant pillars that support the land on the surface of the Earth, while Fermies cause earthquakes by gathering together in massive numbers and lifting up pieces of the Earth's crust. They treat this as a sports competition: Whichever group causes the biggest earthquake (as revealed by intercepted radio transmissions) wins the contest and gets the prize, a piece of Ancient Greek pottery that fell down a crevice in Ancient Roman times in the year zero (i.e., the year 1 BCE translated into astronomical year numbering, which includes a year zero). However, now the Terries and Fermies have assembled for a large-scale bout which would result in Duckburg getting destroyed.

In an attempt to stop the earthquakes, Scrooge steals the trophy, but is forced to discard his top hat during the subsequent escape. The Terries and Fermies pursue in an attempt to stop them, before they can tell the upper world of their existence and thus stall their competition. When that fails, they trigger a series of powerful tremors in order to shake the Ducks back down the shaft. This accidentally causes Scrooge's money bin to dislodge, slide across the shaft, and crack open, spilling all his money into the underground. However, since they think of money as worthless garbage ("We all know what the above-grounders think of money--they try to give it away on their radio quiz shows!"), the Terries and Fermies unite for a massive clean-up. Proclaiming Scrooge's hat as their new trophy, they push the money back into the money bin and then seal the shaft to prevent more money from getting dumped on them.

The story ends with a professor visiting Scrooge to assure him that there will be no more quakes. But when Scrooge asks him what triggered the tremors, and the professor answers that it was "gas that builds up in fissures as the Earth shrinks", Scrooge slyly winks at his nephews with the words (in Southern accent) "He shore ain't been around, has he, podners?"

== Production ==
In a 1975 interview, Barks said, "When you've got a mysterious place, then you develop something out of whole cloth. It's a mysterious place down under the earth. We don't know what's under the crust. Scientists tell us it's a big molten core, but Uncle Scrooge thought that there was a hole down under there, and he was gonna be darn sure that he knew where that hole was. So once I got down to this mysterious hole, why I'd people it with imaginary little characters."

== Reception ==
In Carl Barks and the Disney Comic Book: Unmasking the Myth of Modernity, Thomas Andrae notes this story's return to the theme of people living in a hidden, preindustrial utopia which began in Barks' 1949 Lost in the Andes! "However," Andrae writes, "the story differs from its predecessors in situating its fairy world in a realm that is tied to and affects the everyday one. The geologic realm in literature has come to represent the psychologic, and this story deals with the repressed longings that underlie the civilized psyche." He goes on to say that "the Terries and Fermies represent the repressed desires that undergird the Protestant ethic, fusing work and play and functioning as emblems of unalienated labor."

== Sequel ==
Don Rosa wrote a sequel (of sorts) called The Universal Solvent.

== Other references ==
- This comic was later printed in Gladstone Comic Album #6, Uncle Scrooge Adventures #28, and Carl Barks' Greatest DuckTales Stories Volume 1.
- The comic was adapted into an episode of the original DuckTales (1987) series called "Earth Quack". As Donald Duck wasn't able to be in the show however, Gyro Gearloose, Mrs. Beakley, Webby Vanderquack, and Duckworth were used instead.
- The Terries and Fermies also appeared in the DuckTales reboot episode "Terror of the Terra-firmians" as creatures of urban legend.

== See also ==
- List of Disney comics by Carl Barks
