= The Universal Solvent (comics) =

- Don Rosa's cover for the German publication of the story.
- Story code: D 94066
- Story: Don Rosa
- Ink: Don Rosa
- Hero: Scrooge McDuck
- Pages: 24
- Layout: 4 rows per page
- Appearances: Scrooge McDuck; Donald Duck; Huey, Dewey and Louie; Gyro Gearloose; Little Helper; Gus Goose
- First publication: 1995

"The Universal Solvent" is a 1995 Donald Duck story by Don Rosa. The story was inspired by the novel A Journey to the Center of the Earth and was based on a Pertwillaby Papers adventure titled Vortex. It was also likely a partial sequel of the classic Carl Barks story, "Land Beneath the Ground!". Don Rosa wrote two sequels to this story, called "The Black Knight" and "The Black Knight Glorps Again".

The story was first published in the Danish Anders And & Co. #1995-13; the first American publication was serialized in Walt Disney's Comics and Stories #604-606, in August-December 1996.

== Plot ==
Gyro Gearloose has invented a "universal solvent", a thick, black liquid capable of instantly dissolving anything except diamonds, with it then transforming the dissolved matter into super dense dust. Gyro then keeps the Universal Solvent (referred to as "Omnisolve") in a diamond jar and on an Omnisolve beach umbrella (where a sublayer of diamond dust keeps it from dissolving the umbrella itself). Scrooge McDuck buys the solvent from him, intending on using it for mining, in order to gain the super pure diamonds located in the outer core of the Earth. However, when journalists at a press conference are unappreciative, an angered Scrooge decides to make an impromptu demonstration of the solvent. He carelessly pours it directly onto the ground, where it begins to make a solid shaft all the way down to the centre of the Earth (due to the Omnisolve creating a super-strong and dense lining on the sides of the shaft wall).

After Donald's nephews explain the potentially catastrophic impact of this act - it would eventually lead to the Earth's destruction by destroying the planet's electromagnetic field and causing the Earth to be bombarded with radioactive solar winds - Scrooge, Donald, and the boys go on a quest down the shaft to retrieve the solvent.

They first start slowly going down with a descent platform created by Gyro. In order to stop the air pressure from crushing them, Gyro creates an airlock over the shaft, making the shaft a vacuum, meaning they cannot eat, much to Donald's comical misery. Their platform is also slightly damaged by a falling pebble (which, due to the vacuum having no air to slow it down, was essentially travelling at bullet speed). Scrooge also finds his diamonds, although he is nearly burned by the massive heat of the diamonds, as they were in the outer core. Later, as Scrooge finds out, they become essentially weightless, due to their weight being their attraction to the Earth's mass, and as they travel deeper, more of the Earth is above them than below them, making them almost weightless. They also find out that they have reached a section of the shaft still with air, meaning that they can now eat, much to Donald's glee.

Eventually, they reach the center and, after Scrooge is nearly killed by the Omnisolve, they are able to contain the Universal Solvent. However, the magma from inside the earth mantle will soon break through the shaft, making them have to use propulsion rockets to escape through inner space. Donald has his helmet destroyed by a falling pebble, but still survives, due to air leaking in from cracks. They soon find that the magma is destroying the shaft from the bottom up, and the top of the shaft is collapsing. They are able to escape aided by the Omnisolve umbrella, which saves them from the falling rocks and allows them to create an escape route, but unfortunately, the magma is able to follow them. They eventually find themselves in Terry Fermy, with the Terries and Ferrmies destroying a rock column, forcing them to use another escape route. They eventually find themselves under the Tulebug River, with the river water solidifying the magma.

They then arrive at the Money Bin (given a lift by Gus Goose), with the top of the shaft about to erupt like a volcano. Gyro is able to stop the eruption with the Omnisolve umbrella, which causes the magma to be reduced into a super-dense dust that kept falling back on itself. Scrooge also gets the super-pure diamonds he wanted in the first place (due to them being carried by the magma, but the Omnisolve umbrella could not destroy them). Scrooge's Money Bin is also safe, although it is severely tilted, with Scrooge musing he could still have his workers work there by "wearing some special shoes". In the end, Scrooge deems the solvent as a failed investment. While it did succeed in getting him thousands of flawless diamonds from the bowels of the Earth, he didn't take into account that these diamonds are super-dense, and thus even the smallest ones weigh over 100 kg (200 pounds) each, making them useless as jewellery. He then destroys the Omnisolve notes with the Omnisolve itself, much to Gyro's relief.

== Reception ==
The story is "inspired by SF films", and 'just about having the edge due to its unpredictability and imaginative solution to problems" according to a review.

== See also ==
- The Universal Solvent served as the title story to Fantagraphics Uncle Scrooge and Donald Duck: The Don Rosa Library Vol. 6
