= James L. Halperin =

American author and businessman (born 1952)

James L. Halperin (born October 31, 1952) is an American businessman and author, who is the co-founder and co-chairman of Heritage Auctions, now the largest American auction house with 2024 sales in excess of $1.867 billion. In 1985 Halperin authored a text on grading coins, How to Grade U.S. Coins, upon which the grading standards of the grading services PCGS and NGC were ultimately based. He is the author of two futurist fiction books, The Truth Machine (1996) and The First Immortal (1997), which were in 2001 both chosen by PC Magazine in a survey put out to their online newsletter subscribers, as possible responses for the top 17 science/technology fiction books of the previous 20 years. In the 1980s he and his businesses were investigated by federal agencies (including the Federal Trade Commission), which investigation was settled by signing consent decrees and agreeing to pay a substantial fine.

== Early life ==
Halperin was born on October 31, 1952, in Boston, Massachusetts, to a lower-middle-class Jewish family. At the age of 13, Halperin created a fraudulent mail-order advertising business, which took out ads in magazines looking for people who would pay to join his nonexistent sales network. This scheme drew the attention of the United States Postal Inspection Service. Halperin would end up avoiding charges in exchange for returning $100,000 of the ill-gotten money. At age 16, as a Summer project in 1969 Halperin opened a stamp & coin shop in Cochituate, Massachusetts. The business was almost immediately somewhat profitable. He graduated from Middlesex School in Concord, Massachusetts, in 1970, then attended Harvard College between 1970 and 1971 where he studied psychology and later philosophy. After three semesters, Halperin dropped out to pursue a full-time career in numismatics, and founded New England Rare Coin Galleries (NERCG) in Framingham, Massachusetts.

== Career ==
In 1976 he established a rare coin fund for investors, New England Rare Coin Fund (NERCF) which raised $367,500 for Halperin to invest in rare coins. The Fund was successfully liquidated in April 1980 via public auction, realizing $2,158,450. Every $15,000 unit-holder received over $69,000 after fees on a 3.5-year investment with the 360% profit taxable at capital gain rate. In 1982, he sold part of NERCG to a former employee, Dana Willis; Willis's company went bankrupt in 1987, after the FTC charged Willis with fraud for overvaluing coins and selling them at inflated prices. During the period Willis was allegedly engaged in fraud, he paid Halperin around $1 million in consulting fees. Halperin later returned some of the money, denied involvement in Willis's wrongdoing, and claimed that the money he got from Willis was part of the terms of his sale.

In 1982, Halperin entered into a 50-50 business partnership with renowned numismatist-turned-businessman Steve Ivy and settled in Dallas, Texas. Halperin and Ivy still co-direct Heritage Auctions of Dallas, which advertises itself as the world's largest rare coin company and largest American auction house, with sales above $1.867 billion as of 2024.

In 1984, Halperin founded the coin grading agency Numismatic Certification Institute. NCI went out of business shortly after the FTC found in 1989 that Halperin was giving inflated grades to coins. The overvalued coins were marketed through a Heritage Auctions-backed company named Certified Rare Coin Galleries, which used infomercials to sell silver and gold U.S. coins for more than twice their actual value. Heritage Auctions agreed to pay $1.2 million in restitution, though Halperin continues to insist that most of the coin grades he gave during those times were valid and would still hold up today.

A profile on Halperin appeared in Forbes in 2004, to which Halperin posted an annotated (clarified and/or corrected in footnotes) version on Heritage's website.

In 2019, Halperin, along with Zac Gieg, the founder and owner of Just Press Play Video Games, and video game collector Rich Lecce, purchased a copy of Super Mario Bros from Nintendo's test market launch in 1985 from his Heritage Auctions auction house for $100,150, which at the time set a new auction world record for a graded video game.

In April 2025, Jim Halperin received the Abe Kosoff Founders Award, the Professional Numismatists Guild's highest award. Halperin also received American Numismatic Association's highest award in July 2025.

== Personal life ==
Halperin also endows The Halperin Foundation, which supports health, arts and education-related charities. In September 2024, the foundation donated $23 million to I-35 Deck Park and changed its name to Halperin Park after claiming the renaming rights.

He has been married to his wife Gayle since 1984 and they have two sons, David (born 1991) and Michael (1995–2023).

His niece is Molly DeWolf Swenson, American Idol Season 10 contestant and co-founder of RYOT (sold to Huffington Post / AOL in 2016).

In the course of researching for and writing The First Immortal, Halperin signed up to be cryopreserved. His parents also signed up and were cryopreserved by the Cryonics Institute in 2014 and 2020.
