= Sowlan =

Sowlan or Sulan or Sowlon or Sulon (Persian: صولان or سولان) may refer to:

- Sulan, Ardabil (صولان)
- Sulan, Hamadan (صولان)
- Sowlan, Jiroft (صولان), Kerman Province
- Sowlan, Qaleh Ganj (صولان), Kerman Province
- Sulan, Sistan and Baluchestan (سولان)
- Sulan, Chabahar (صولان), Sistan and Baluchestan Province

== In fiction ==
- Sulan is a Vidiian character in "Faces (Star Trek: Voyager)"
