= Tuvix =

- Star Trek: Voyager episode
- Episode no.: Season 2 Episode 24
- Directed by: Cliff Bole
- Story by: Andrew Shepard Price; Mark Gaberman
- Teleplay by: Kenneth Biller
- Cinematography by: Marvin V. Rush
- Editing by: Daryl Baskin
- Production code: 140
- Original air date: May 6, 1996
- Running time: 46 minutes

Guest appearances
- Tom Wright as Tuvix; Simon Billig as Hogan; Bahni Turpin as Swinn

Episode chronology
← Previous "The Thaw"	Next → "Resolutions"
- Star Trek: Voyager season 2

"Tuvix" is the 40th episode (24th in the second season) of the science fiction television program Star Trek: Voyager. The episode originally aired on UPN on May 6, 1996, and tells the story of Tuvok and Neelix being merged into a unique third character named Tuvix.

The episode was substantially rewritten from its original iteration as a lighthearted story to a more somber tale with serious moral and ethical implications. Tom Wright guest stars as Tuvix to lend more credence to a unique new character that consists of equal parts Tuvok and Neelix. Both director Cliff Bole and Wright himself had reservations about the latter's take on the character, and despite a perceived lack of support, Wright still praised the Voyager cast and crew. Both the story and performances of "Tuvix" were lauded by the production team and critics alike.

"Tuvix" was well received by fans and critics, earning generally positive reviews. Researchers and critics found "Tuvix" teeming with technical and philosophical content, including thematic ties to other episodes in the Star Trek canon, real-world logical and metaphysical ramifications, and scientific concessions for the story.

== Plot ==
On stardate 49655.2, Lieutenant Tuvok (Tim Russ) and Neelix (Ethan Phillips) are sent to collect botanical samples from a class-M planet. When beamed back aboard Voyager, the two men and the orchids they collected are merged at the molecular level to become a single lifeform which names himself Tuvix (Wright). After ruling out transporter malfunction, the crew discovers that when demolecularized, the genetic material of the alien flowers acted as a symbiogenetic catalyst and is the culprit for the combination of the two crewmembers. Unfortunately, the process cannot be reversed, and Tuvix is accepted as a member of the crew with the rank of lieutenant, functioning as chief tactical officer in Tuvok's stead.

Kes (Jennifer Lien) reacts poorly to Tuvix as his existence deprives her of both Tuvok and Neelix, her mentor and boyfriend respectively. Her displeasure lessens over the course of the episode, but never completely eases. Captain Janeway (Kate Mulgrew) accepts Tuvix in his role as an excellent chief tactical officer and "an able advisor, who skillfully uses humor to make his points". Tuvix himself, having the combined memories and personalities of his constituents, melds the previously intractable qualities of both and improves upon them, flexing either muscle as the situation requires: "Chief of security or head chef, take your pick!"

Two weeks after the accident, the Doctor (Robert Picardo) develops a contemporary equivalent to radiocontrasting, using a custom radioisotope with which he can identify the disparate DNA of the two original crewmen and use the transporter to disentangle them. However, Tuvix denounces the procedure; he argues that he has rights, and to restore the two lost crewmen would require his execution. After discussing the situation with Commander Chakotay (Robert Beltran), Kes, and Tuvix himself, Janeway ultimately decides to proceed with the separation, acting in absentia to protect the rights of the two constituent men. Tuvix makes a final emotive plea for support from the crew, but finds no supporters. After the Doctor refuses to take Tuvix's life in compliance with the medical precept of doing no harm, Janeway performs the procedure herself and succeeds in restoring both Tuvok and Neelix.

== Production ==
Wendy Neuss, Merri D. Howard, Kenneth Biller, Peter Lauritson, and Brannon Braga were all credited as producers on "Tuvix", while Jay Chattaway was credited with the music and Marvin V. Rush was the cinematographer. Daryl Baskin edited the episode to its 46-minute runtime.

=== Writing ===
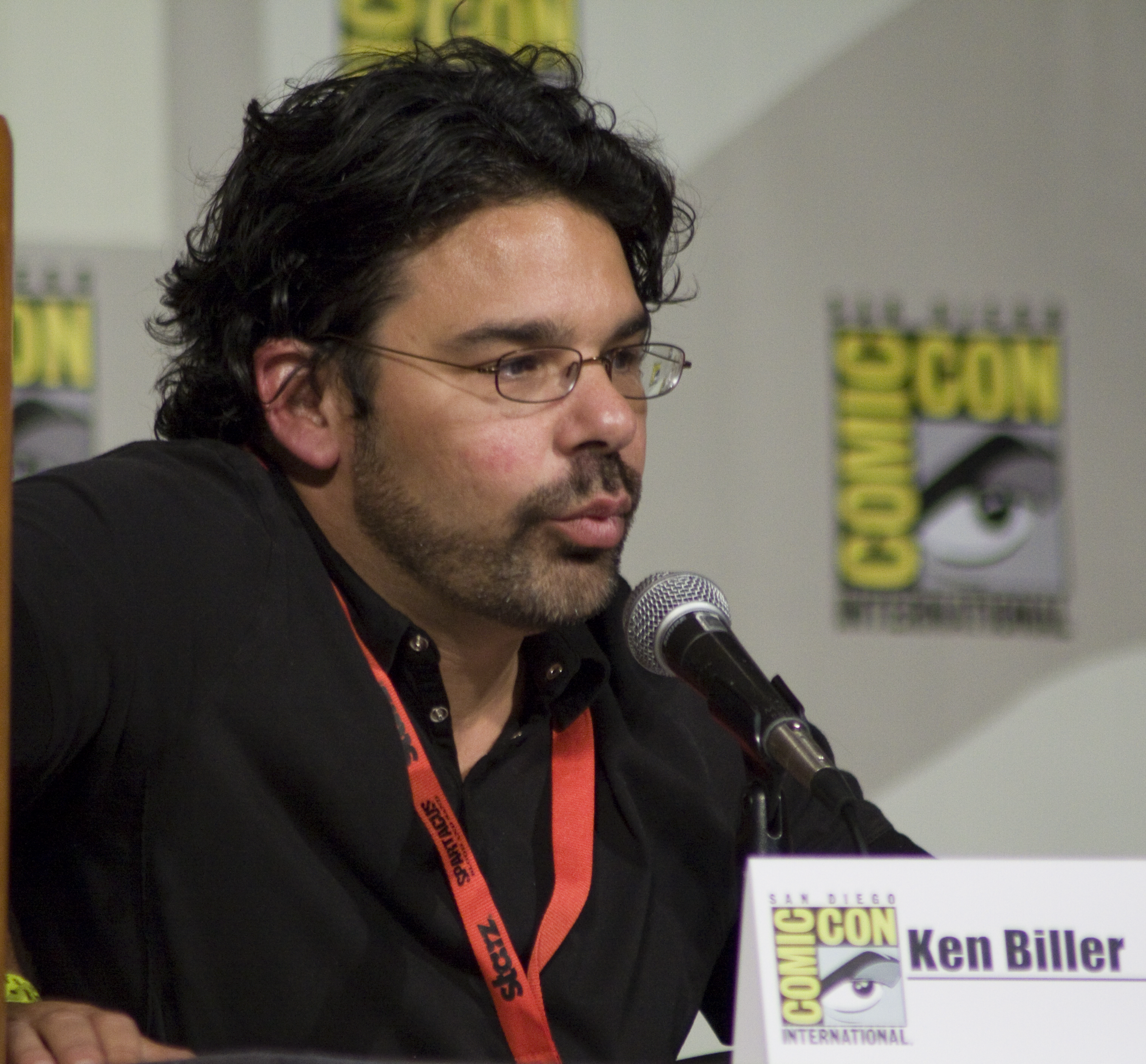
Kenneth Biller (2009)

During its development, "Tuvix" was previously known as "Untitled Tuvok/Neelix", "One", and "Symbiogenesis", with the third of these persisting through the episode's development and shooting. The episode and its teleplay were written by Kenneth Biller; the story is credited to Andrew Shepard Price and Mark Gaberman, for which they earned US$7,000 (equivalent to $14,370 in 2025). Though described by Biller as "high-concept", the original story by Price and Gaberman was much more light-hearted and tended towards slapstick. Biller and Braga found the tone of the episode was so akin to a 1960s sitcom, the two of them even wrote a theme song for it: "It's Tuvok, it's Neelix! It's two guys, in-a-fix! It's Tuuuuvix!" Biller re-wrote the episode to focus more on the serious philosophical questions raised by the episode and especially the inevitable separation of Tuvix back into the series regulars. In Biller's original treatment, Tuvix recognized that the needs of the many outweigh the needs of the few and consented to his fissure. However, after a discussion with executive producer Michael Piller, Biller began to "[poke] at the audience" by throwing up roadblocks to the episode's foregone conclusion; first Tuvix was re-written to object to the procedure, and then the Doctor's refusal was added to force Captain Janeway to put truth to action. Piller later described Biller as "the poet laureate of Star Trek", highlighting his work on "Tuvix" and "Lifesigns" as examples.

=== Filming ===
Tom Wright described working on "Tuvix" as an exercise in forcing himself to work outside his known comfort areas and confessed he was unsure of the quality of the end product. The actor complained about what he saw as a lack of support and guidance from the Voyager team, saying he felt adrift and unsure as to what was expected of his performance, especially since his portrayal reflected two of the starring characters. However, he also conceded that it may have been intentional in an effort to evoke a genuine sense of off-balancedness in the character. Either way, though he was unaccustomed to the environment, Wright expressed his willingness to revisit Tuvix or even work on any Star Trek again if the opportunity arose. In interviews, Wright specifically fondly recalled his time working with Jennifer Lien (Kes), Kate Mulgrew (Captain Janeway), and director Cliff Bole.

In a 1997 interview, Wright explained how the episode's dialogue posed a challenge in that not only did he have to take great care to adhere to the vernacular of Star Trek and not sound too contemporary or "too 1997", but he had to take several days to accommodate himself to the episode's "treknobabble" with the assistance of Robert Duncan McNeill (Tom Paris). Bole later praised Wright for his ability to improvise, but explained that it was to the actor's detriment as "Star Trek is not an ad-lib format", and he felt Wright assumed he could wing some of it. Mulgrew also bemoaned the technobabble in "Tuvix" when asked by Starlog for her most memorable line thereof; "When did he cease to be a transporter accident and start to be an individual?"

Mulgrew's final scene in "Tuvix"

Bole heaped praise on the episode's final scene in which Janeway "stalks" into the corridor outside sickbay after performing the procedure which restores Tuvok and Neelix. He extolled, "That last shot I did with Kate [Mulgrew], as she's walking into the camera, she told the whole story with her face. She gave a great performance. I only asked for a few things; she brought that look and emotion to work with her." In his book The Meaning of Star Trek, author Thomas Richards also credited Mulgrew in this scene. Richards saw Janeway troubled by her difficult decision between two undesirable options and how "she must live with the choice. [A] death has cast a shadow over the ship, and for the first time in the series the Federation has put to death one of its own."

In a 1996 interview, Robert Picardo reminisced that as the Doctor he had "a substantial amount" to do in "Tuvix". Picardo would also look back on the episode, and the scene in which he "countermand[s] the captain" especially, as a turning point in the Doctor's and Janeway's relationship, calling it an "interesting moment for both characters". Ethan Phillips also remembered being excited reading the script for "Tuvix", as it was an opportunity to discover more about his character.

The science lab set in the first act is a redress of the isolation chamber in sickbay, but with a blue background as opposed to the yellow.

== Casting ==
In addition to Tom Wright as Tuvix, guest stars included Simon Billig as Hogan and Bahni Turpin as Swinn. Casting for "Tuvix" was done by Junie Lowry-Johnson, C.S.A., and Ron Surma.

=== Tuvix ===
Director Cliff Bole and the episode's producers originally considered having series regular Ethan Phillips (Neelix) portray Tuvix, but decided against it, fearing that he was too identifiable and would have difficulty integrating an equal amount of the Tuvok character into his performance.

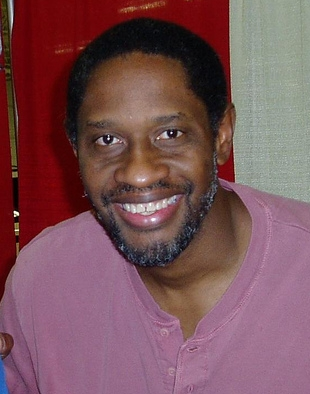
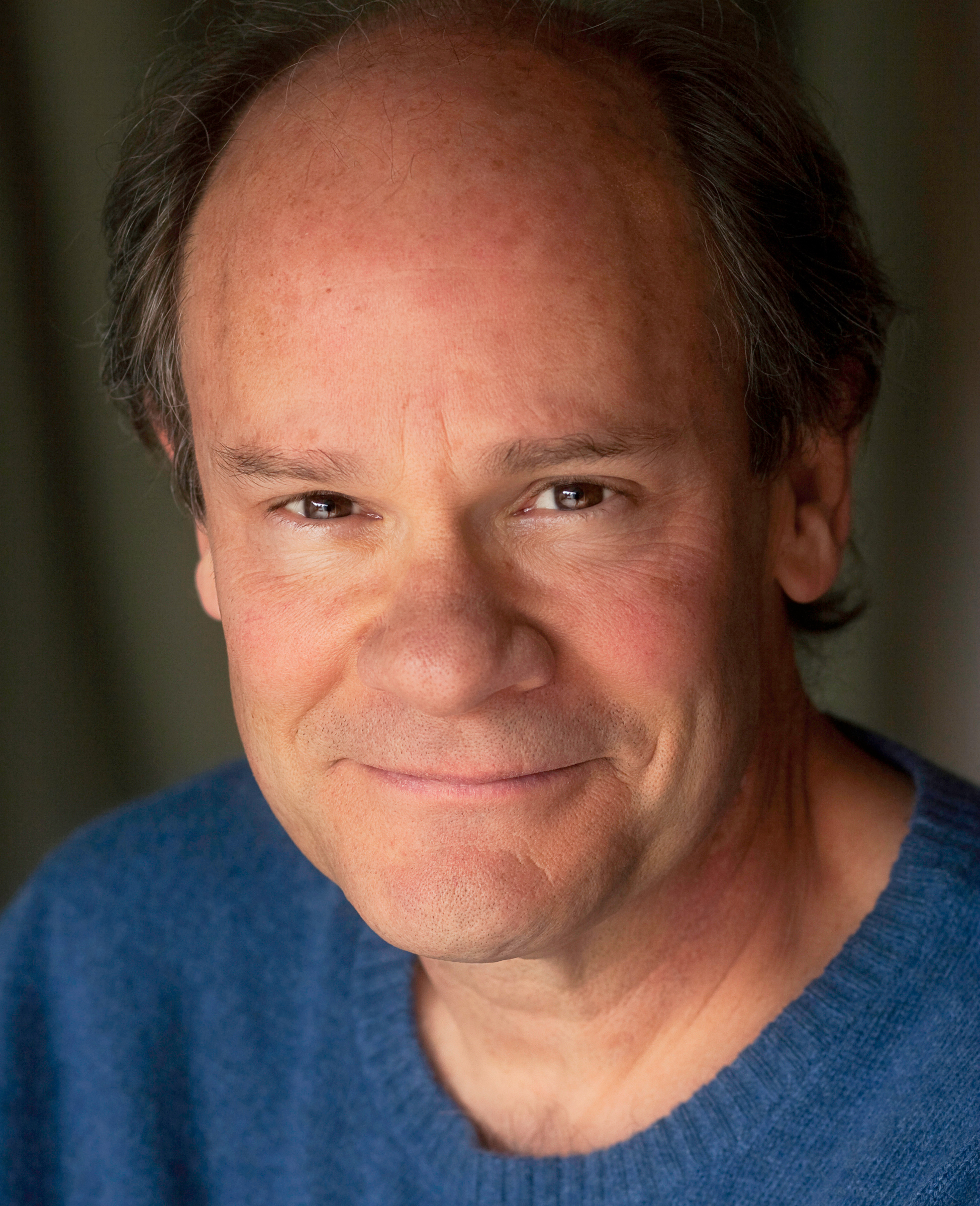
Tom Wright drew upon his personal encounters with Tim Russ (left) and Ethan Phillips (right) as opposed to their characters in his audition. Phillips was originally considered for the part.

The only non-recurring guest star in "Tuvix" is the eponymous fusion of two main characters. Though guest stars have occasionally played major recurring characters—e.g. Sandra Smith as Captain Kirk in the original Star Trek's "Turnabout Intruder" and David Birkin as Captain Picard in Star Trek: The Next Generation's "Rascals"—Tom Wright is the first to portray two in the same episode.

When contacted by his talent agent, Wright jumped at the opportunity to create a character wholly unique to the Star Trek franchise. When he auditioned for the role of Tuvix, Wright had never seen Star Trek: Voyager and was completely unfamiliar with the characterizations of Tuvok and Neelix. Instead, he drew upon his prior experiences with the characters' actors, Tim Russ and Ethan Phillips respectively, to successfully vie for the role. Executive producer Jeri Taylor was pleased with the casting of Wright, marveling at his ability to bring credibility to the prospect of two characters in one.

After securing the role, Wright was provided video of Tuvok and Neelix from previous episodes from which he refined the character. Instead of portraying Tuvix as simply a vessel for two separate consciousnesses, Wright blended the two characters to form a unique third. Wright focused on juxtaposing the contrary physical and emotional natures of the two characters in his performance; in scenes where Neelix's persona is more prominent, Wright played up Tuvok's composed physicality, and in scenes where Tuvok's skills and experience were needed, Wright leaned more heavily on Neelix's exuberant mannerisms. Wright also worked hard to exhibit the intrinsic warmth of both characters and make Tuvix as likable and sympathetic a character as possible. Author David McIntee (Delta Quadrant) felt that Tuvix expressed more of Neelix's mannerisms than Tuvok's. He also noted that Tuvix adopted Neelix's right-handedness as opposed to Tuvok's left-handedness.

==== Costuming and makeup ====
Episode screenshot of Wright in costume and makeup as Tuvix

McIntee hypothesizes that the modified Starfleet uniform Tuvix initially wears after his creation was influenced by the orchids which were also transported. He called it "an illogical but subtle and attractive stylistic touch" and praised its design suggesting they all be modified duly. Robert Blackman served as costume designer for "Tuvix".

In an interview with The Official Star Trek Voyager Magazine in 1998, director Cliff Bole spoke highly of guest star Tom Wright, saying he was a "good actor [who] prides himself on being Shakespearian", but felt that he was in over his head working on Star Trek, particularly underestimating the rigors of working under the requisite makeup. Bole detailed a four-hour, 4 a.m. process to apply the glue, mask, and prostheses before the actor even began delivering his lines for what was an all-day shoot; all of these "subtract from [the] performance" of actors unaccustomed to them. Bole tempered himself explaining that he had seen "really competent actors" suffer from the same trials and simple exhaustion that he saw in Wright's performance. For his part, Wright compared the trials of the "heavy makeup" and contact lenses required to play Tuvix with his previous roles on Creepshow 2 and Tales from the Crypt. Tuvix's makeup was designed and supervised by Michael Westmore. Despite the obfuscation of Wright's face, he was still recognized by fans on the street 25 years later.

== Analysis ==
Elaine Graham's book Representations of the Post/Human uses "Tuvix" to contrast Star Trek: Voyager with Star Trek: The Next Generation; "Tuvix" is an example of how the former series tended to incorporate stories that touched on moral and ethically ambiguous situations and decisions. Graham notes how the character of Tuvix was written to encourage audience sympathies, yet was still effectively sentenced to death in contravention of what she describes as the "exemplary Star Trek values [of] sentience, self-determination, and personhood". Thomas Richards' The Meaning of Star Trek also focused on the morality of decisions in "Tuvix" as compared to the original Star Trek and The Next Generation; more than Star Trek: Deep Space Nine, the Voyager is far from the United Federation of Planets and "must address every value of the Federation [...] in a universe in which those values may no longer apply." Richards describes the episode as "truly remarkable" for its depiction of Janeway's sentence of capital punishment and her performing the very first execution in all of Star Trek. Not only is this shocking for the audience in comparison to episodes and series past, but even the fictional Voyager crew are stunned. In 2000, David McIntee pointed to these themes and plot points as having made "Tuvix" the most debated episode in Star Trek fandom yet, and one of Star Trek: Voyager's "most thought-provoking, and [...] single most discussed, episode."

In her book American Science Fiction TV, Jan Johnson-Smith noted that "Tuvix" is one of a recurring type of Star Trek episodes concerned with issues of individuality and self. She thematically tied this episode to Star Trek: The Original Series' episode "The Enemy Within" where the transporter rends Captain Kirk into two separate representations of his psyche, Star Trek: Deep Space Nine's character of Jadzia Dax who is of a conjoined species (Trill) that repeatedly goes through a conjoining process when the host organism dies, and Star Trek: Voyager's episode "Faces" where hybrid Human/Klingon character B'Elanna Torres is split along her bloodline into two separate species. When asked regarding accusations of "Tuvix" and other Voyager episodes simply aping previous Star Trek series in this way, executive producer Michael Piller called out Time for their comments on the matter before conceding, "[Y]ou've got to keep new people coming in and pitching because otherwise you're going to be retreading an old ground." Seven years later, when writing Star Trek: Enterprise's "Similitude", Manny Coto took pains to write that episode dissimilarly to "Tuvix".

In his paper published in the Polish Journal of Philosophy, University of Sussex professor Murali Ramachandran examines the combination of Tuvok and Neelix into a single individual for its implications to modal logic. Ramachandran, though forced to disregard the metaphysical considerations imposed by "the very nature of tele-transportation", promotes a "Kripkean counterpart theory" using this study of the characters.

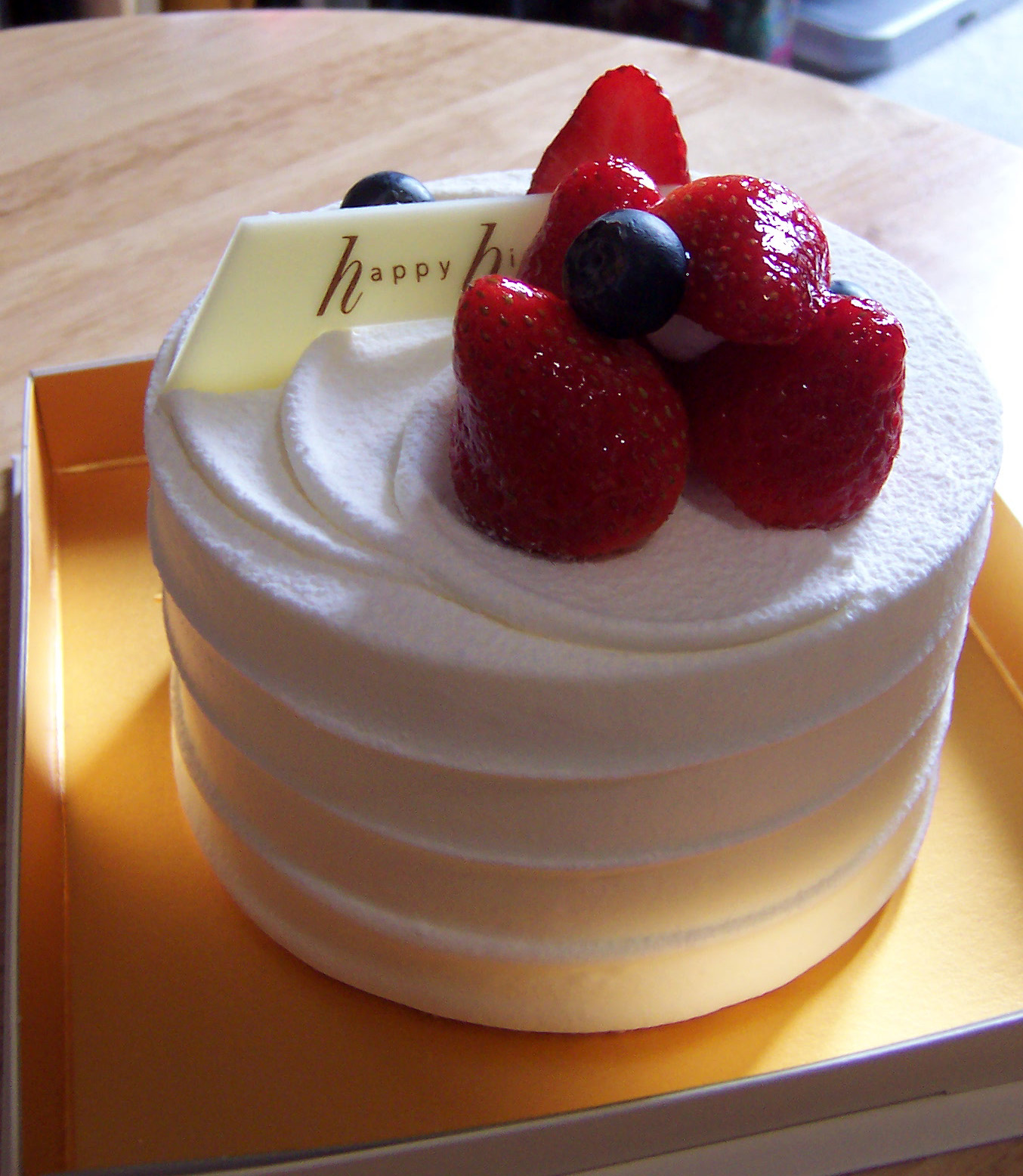
"Think of trying to transform a baked cake back into raw eggs, flour, sugar, vanilla . . . and you get a simplified idea of the magnitude of [recreating Tuvok and Neelix from Tuvix]." —Dr. Andreadis

Athena Andreadis' book To Seek Out New Life: The Biology of Star Trek attempts and fails to legitimize the episode's biologic science, even accepting all other technologies presented. Not only does the synthesis of Tuvok and Neelix violate the law of conservation of mass, but the separation poses the problem of differentiating the two species' genes, a significant hurdle when science of the 1990s could not differentiate between humans and chimpanzees. After detailing the combination of the Talaxian and Vulcan species, the cellular chromosomal pairing, and the "synaptic coherence of two brains/minds within one skull", Andreadis finds the whole proposition laughable from a scientific standpoint, comparing it to the 1986 film The Fly as an example of bad science. Ultimately, she comes down against the transporter regarding its fictional capacity to do that which is claimed.

=== Tuvix (character) ===
Tom Wright spoke on his interpretation of the character in 1997: he felt the two constituent halves of Tuvix "represent[ed] the left and the right side of the brain—where one is weak the other is strong, and vice versa."

In his 2005 book, Teleportation: The Impossible Leap, David J. Darling notes that while Tuvix was well-liked by other characters, his fate was in fact ultimately determined not by his arguments or the decision of the captain, but by the "[e]nsemble casting and contractual arrangements" of the show. Wright also felt the separation of Tuvix was inevitable from a perspective of dramatic necessity. A UPN promotional video for the episode played on expectations of the audience to like Tuvix at the cost of the Tuvok and Neelix characters.

Over 25 years after the episode first aired, the character of Tuvix continued to be a hot-button topic, not only because the character was well-liked, but because of Janeway's decision. John Van Citters was ViacomCBS' vice president of franchise planning and Star Trek brand development, and in his many discussions with franchise artists and fans, Tuvix continued to be "over-indexed for a character that’s only made one appearance." Star Trek: Lower Decks showrunner Mike McMahan described the character and his fate as a touchstone for "Deep Lore Trekkie[s]". Voyager novelist Kirsten Beyer defended Janeway's decision as one of two terrible choices. Mohamed Noor would not agree with her decision while unable to call it irrational or immoral. In 2020, Alexandria Ocasio-Cortez was a member of the US House of Representatives from New York City when she spoke about Janeway's decision in "Tuvix", saying, "One thing I learned watching Janeway growing up is how leadership means being responsible for working through dilemmas w/ no clear answers."

Tuvix was never mentioned again during Voyager's remaining five seasons. The Star Trek: Lower Decks episode "Twovix" references Tuvix, depicting a similar incident.

== Reception ==
Writer Kenneth Biller said that he received a "lot of mail" regarding "Tuvix" and that Janeway's tough decisions in the episode generated a lot of discussion and moved a lot of people. Director Cliff Bole felt the episode was "well-accepted", and both he and the producers liked it. Actor Tom Wright explained the episode's popularity saying it resounded with viewers because it had no outright moralizations or specific good and evil characters; the episode deals with a no-win scenario. Writer Thomas Richards concurred with Wright in agreeing that the episode's frank depiction without any judgments was a significant strength in its favor. In a March 2023 episode of The Ready Room, Tim Russ called "Tuvix" one of the show's most controversial episodes, telling Wil Wheaton that in the preceding few years, fans had begun consistently asking him about it.

Nikki Harper for STAR TREK: The Official Monthly Magazine gave the episode four out of five stars, Cinefantastique's Dale Kutzera gave "Tuvix" three out of four stars, and Bill Florence for The Official Star Trek Voyager Magazine called it one of Voyager's "strongest episodes to date". In his book Delta Quadrant: The unofficial guide to Voyager, David McIntee was impressed by the episode's capacity to rise above its "appallingly silly" premise; he attributed this to the casting of Tom Wright as Tuvix, whose acting he saw as a guide to the tempo of the episode, keeping it from proceeding too slowly. He gave the episode an 8 out of 10 rating.

Wired magazine criticized the episode, saying that although the episode might have seemed like a great concept, it failed in practice and was "an awkward, embarrassing mess that fails to land any of the deeper points it so desperately wants to make." Writing for Tor.com in 2020, Keith DeCandido "[admired] the execution of most of this episode" and praised the "amazing work" of Wright, Mulgrew, and Lien, but was frustrated that Janeway's actions had no consequences. He rated the episode 4 out of 10. After considering the discussion generated in the comments underneath his review, he later acknowledged how the episode's moral dilemma generated significant conversation among the fanbase when it first aired, and continued to do so 25 years later.

In 2014, io9's Charlie Jane Anders ranked "Tuvix" 56th of the top 100 episodes of the Star Trek franchise. In 2015, Syfy's Lisa Granshaw placed "Tuvix" among Star Trek: Voyager's top ten.

== See also ==
- Trolley problem – Thought experiment in ethics
