= Lifesigns (Star Trek: Voyager) =

- Star Trek: Voyager episode
- Episode no.: Season 2 Episode 19
- Directed by: Cliff Bole
- Written by: Kenneth Biller
- Production code: 136
- Original air date: February 26, 1996

Guest appearances
- Susan Diol - Danara Pel; Raphael Sbarge - Michael Jonas; Martha Hackett - Seska; Michael Spound - Lorrum; Rick Gianasi - Gigolo

Episode chronology
← Previous "Death Wish"	Next → "Investigations"
- Star Trek: Voyager season 2

"Lifesigns" is the 35th episode of Star Trek: Voyager, the 19th episode of the second season. It has an average fan rating of 4.2/5 on the official Star Trek website as of September, 2009.

Set in the 24th century, the series follows the adventures of the Federation starship Voyager during its journey home to Earth, having been stranded tens of thousands of light-years away. The episode centers on a Vidiian woman whom the Doctor works to save.

This episode was previously known as "Untitled Doctor" and "Magnetism". The finally adopted title has a dual meaning: the lifesigns the Doctor finds in the body of Danara, the Vidiian woman, and his own growing self-awareness as a sentient life form through the experience of romance.

Actress Susan Diol guest stars as the alien woman Denara Pel.

The episode aired on UPN on February 26, 1996.

== Plot ==
Paris arrives late to the bridge as a distress call is picked up. Voyager beams aboard the dying body of a Vidiian woman. The Doctor works to save her in Sickbay. Finding that she has a neural interface which can store her consciousness, he creates a holographic body of her to assist him; a hologram which looks and acts the way she would if she were healthy. Her name is Danara Pel and she is a physician, ready and able to help heal the disease-ravaged body on the bed. Voyager detects and sets course for a Vidiian colony where they can drop off Pel. The Doctor soon realizes he is falling in love with Dr. Pel, but has trouble sorting out his feelings toward the vibrant hologram and the real, dying patient. Kes and Paris assist the Doctor with these feelings and, with the help of one of Paris' romantic holo-programs (a '57 Chevy parked on a hill overlooking a Mars colony), Dr. Pel and the Doctor share their first kiss.

As part of the Doctor's plan to treat her, he requests a small sample of B'Elanna Torres' brain tissue to use as a graft; Klingon DNA has been shown to be resistant to the Phage. Torres is initially outraged at the suggestion, still traumatized by her treatment by the Vidiians, but she soon relents upon meeting Dr. Pel's hologram in Sickbay. The Doctor administers the graft but later discovers the body is rejecting it due to an improperly administered chemical. The Doctor first accuses Kes of making a mistake before starting to alert Lieutenant Tuvok of an attempted murder, but Pel stops him. She admits she injected the chemical in an attempt to kill her own diseased body, even knowing it will kill her holographic self as well, as she cannot bear to return to the way she used to be. The Doctor and Pel argue over whether or not to save her life, and the Doctor finally convinces her that he does not care what she looks like, and that they would have more time together than if she were to die.

Following the procedure, Pel meets the Doctor at Sandrine's on the Holodeck, where he had taken her previously. Back in her grafted and scarred physical body, she approaches him apprehensively. The Doctor merely smiles and takes her in his arms, and the two dance.

A small subplot in this episode involves Tom Paris' increased insubordination and overall lack of discipline, coming to a head as Chakotay relieves him of duty after becoming fed up with his behavior. After Paris pushes Chakotay to the floor during an argument, Captain Janeway asks Tuvok to place Paris in the brig. This storyline would resolve in the following episode "Investigations".

== Reception and viewing guides ==
In 2017, Den of Geek included this episode, along with "Meld", "Death Wish", and "Deadlock" from Season 2, for their abbreviated viewing guide for Star Trek: Voyager.

In 2017, Den of Geek ranked actress Susan Diol as Denara Pel as the 4th best guest star on Star Trek: Voyager, for her acting performance in this episode and "Resolutions" (S 2: Ep 25).

In 2021, SyFy said this was a "rewarding episode" for Torres, and it explores anger and forgiveness.
