= Resolutions (Star Trek: Voyager) =

- Star Trek: Voyager episode
- Episode no.: Season 2 Episode 25
- Directed by: Alexander Singer
- Written by: Jeri Taylor
- Production code: 141
- Original air date: May 13, 1996

Guest appearances
- Simon Billig - Hogan; Susan Diol - Denara Pel; Bahni Turpin - Swinn

Episode chronology
← Previous "Tuvix"	Next → "Basics"
- Star Trek: Voyager season 2

"Resolutions" is the 41st episode, the 25th episode of the second season. The episode aired on UPN on May 13, 1996.

Set in the late 24th century, the series follows the crew of the starship USS Voyager, after the ship was displaced to the Delta Quadrant, far from the rest of the Federation. This episode focuses on the relationship between Captain Janeway and First Officer Chakotay, who have been left on a planet after contracting a virus, while the rest of the crew search for a cure under Tuvok's command.

The episode was well received by critics, who highlighted the relationship between Janeway and Chakotay; it also served to address the shipping of the two characters among some fans.

== Plot ==
Captain Janeway (Kate Mulgrew) and Chakotay (Robert Beltran) both contract a deadly virus from a wassoop-insect, and they are forced to remain on the planet where they contracted it, where the environment prevents the disease from killing them. Janeway orders Voyager to continue its journey to the Alpha Quadrant, with Tuvok (Tim Russ) as its new captain. Janeway explicitly forbids Tuvok from contacting the Vidiians, who might have knowledge about a cure for the virus, as previously they have taken every opportunity to harvest organs from Voyager's crew.

Janeway and Chakotay prepare to spend the rest of their lives alone together on the planet. Janeway researches potential cures for the virus. Chakotay states that since a cure couldn't be found by Voyager's doctor (Robert Picardo), they should stop searching and instead enjoy the time they have left, but Janeway refuses. Janeway finds a primate-like creature, who alerts her to a coming plasma-storm. The storm rapidly destroys much of the research equipment. Romantic tension develops between Chakotay and Janeway.

Many of the crew, especially Ensign Harry Kim (Garrett Wang), come to believe that Voyager should contact the Vidiians. The crew does have B'Elanna Torres (Roxann Dawson), whose DNA possesses an incredibly powerful immune system which the Vidiians believe could offer a cure to the Phage (a disease which has ravaged them for centuries). The ship also has the goodwill of the Vidiian scientist Dr. Denara Pel (Susan Diol), who had previously been saved by the ship's doctor; they also enjoyed a short romance. (Note: As depicted in "Lifesigns") Tuvok and Kim argue twice over this course of action, with Tuvok thinking this is illogical. One of the many reasons for this is that Voyager had recently destroyed a Vidiian ship, leading to the loss of three hundred of their people. (Note: As depicted in "Deadlock") Kim argues and comes close to being permanently relieved of duty. The next day, Kes (Jennifer Lien) comes to talk to Tuvok in the ready-room. Tuvok realizes that, considering the opinions of Kes and many of the crew on the bridge, changing his mind might be the best thing to do. Voyager then contacts the Vidiians, who seem willing to work with them.

However, it is a trap with a large force of Vidiians arriving for battle. Pel herself had formulated a cure and she contacts the Doctor on his personal channel. With a few split-second maneuvers, the crew manages to transport the medication. On the planet, well after the debris from the storm had been cleaned up, Janeway and Chakotay are discussing their new vegetable garden. Suddenly their badge-communicators begin to work again. It is Tuvok, who is still many hours away. Eventually, the two pack up from their new home and return to Voyager, resuming their former professional relationship.

== Production ==
The episode was directed by Alexander Singer, while Jeri Taylor wrote the screenplay. Dennis McCarthy wrote the music for the episode. Susan Diol guest stars as Denara Pel, a Vidiian doctor who previously appeared in the earlier second season episode "Lifesigns".

=== Writing ===
As an episodic series rather than serialised, Star Trek: Voyager rarely considered its continuity, which garnered common criticism of the show considering its premise of being stranded from the Federation and embarking on a long journey to return to Earth with limited resources. One critic wrote that the series actively avoided episodic continuity "like the plague". This episode sees Janeway and Chakotay engage in a romantic relationship while living alone together on a planet; the characters had flirted together before, but the relationship between them was never explored beyond this episode.

Writing for Tor.com in 2020, Keith DeCandido recalled the vocal subset of Voyager fans present on online forums back in the 1990s who wanted to see the two characters get together, and praised writer Jeri Taylor's work on doing so in the episode while still keeping the continuity standalone. Kate Mulgrew and Robert Beltran, who portrayed Janeway and Chakotay, respectively, have similarly acknowledged fan demand regarding a relationship between their characters, with Beltran seeing this episode as "a bone that was thrown to the many fans that were crying out for a Janeway and Chakotay relationship."

Both Mulgrew and Beltran have remarked on the potential relationship between the characters. Mulgrew remarked that she thought the episode was "wonderful", but was left as equally disconcerted as the audience that the romance was never explored any further. Beltran thought that the script was interesting and cemented their relationship, but not necessarily in a romantic way. He criticised the romance as superficial, barely progressing beyond hand-holding, and believed that Janeway never took Chakotay seriously. Beltran remarked that a relationship between Janeway and Chakotay had never been seriously considered by the writers, and that he would like to have seen more relationships in the series beyond Tom Paris and B'Elanna Torres. Beltran ultimately felt that both he and Mulgrew were indifferent towards a relationship forming between the two characters – a sentiment Mulgrew has shared.

=== Continuity ===
The seventh season episode "Shattered" sees Janeway and Chakotay discuss if their relationship could ever have progressed further, which Chakotay denies.

== Reception ==
Cinefantastique rated the episode 2½ out of 4 stars. Jamahl Epsicokhan of Jammer's Reviews gave it two stars out of four and noted it has "some good moments", but criticised the ambiguity between Janeway and Chakotay's relationship on the planet, as the audience are only shown them holding hands before fading to a commercial break. DeCandido praised both the dynamic between Janeway and Chakotay and Tuvok's role as acting captain, and rated the episode 9/10.

In 2017, Den of Geek ranked actress Susan Diol as the fourth best guest star on Star Trek: Voyager.

== Home media releases ==
"Resolutions" was released on VHS in the UK paired with "Basics, Part I".

On May 18, 2004, this episode was released on DVD as part of a Season 2 boxset; Star Trek Voyager: Complete Second Season.
