= Meld (Star Trek: Voyager) =

- Star Trek: Voyager episode
- Episode no.: Season 2 Episode 16
- Directed by: Cliff Bole
- Story by: Michael Sussman
- Teleplay by: Michael Piller
- Production code: 133
- Original air date: February 5, 1996

Guest appearances
- Brad Dourif - Lon Suder; Angela Dohrmann - Ricky; Simon Billig - Hogan

Episode chronology
← Previous "Threshold"	Next → "Dreadnought"
- Star Trek: Voyager season 2

"Meld" is the 32nd episode of Star Trek: Voyager, the 16th episode of the second season. In this science fiction television show, a crewman is murdered aboard starship Voyager. Tuvok investigates and the character Suder is introduced. However, when Tuvok conducts a Vulcan mind meld, things go further awry.

The episode aired on UPN on February 5, 1996.

== Plot ==
A crewmember named Darwin is found dead and an investigation soon uncovers a murder. It is discovered that Lon Suder, a Betazoid, killed him, because he did not like the way Darwin looked at him.

To discover the reasoning behind Suder's admittedly senseless act, Tuvok initiates a mind meld with Suder. This causes Suder's violent impulses to be transferred to the Vulcan, giving Suder a sense of calm by causing Tuvok to experience uncontrollable violent urges himself: he even attacks a holographic form of Neelix. Eventually, Tuvok confines himself to quarters, and removes himself from duty as he is unable to control his violent urges. The Doctor attempts to cure Tuvok of his urges by forcing his emotions into the open. This fails, and Tuvok is able to escape. He finds Suder with the intent of executing him, hoping this will satisfy himself. Tuvok is convinced by Suder not to kill him and instead mind melds in an attempt to get his emotional control back. This meld renders Tuvok unconscious, allowing Suder to notify the crew. Later, the Doctor watches over Tuvok, hopeful that since he controlled himself enough to not kill Suder, he is recovering.

Meanwhile, Tom Paris runs a pool to bet replicator rations on what the radiogenic particle count will be. When Chakotay learns of it, he ends the pool and confiscates the replicator rations.

== Continuity ==
Lon Suder's character arc continues and ends in "Basics" parts I and II, which bridge seasons two and three.

== Reception ==
"Meld" was given a Nielsen rating of 5.1 when it aired in 1996.

Den of Geek included this episode, along with "Lifesigns", "Death Wish", and "Deadlock" from Season 2, for their abbreviated viewing guide for Star Trek: Voyager. Screen Rant ranked "Meld" as one of the top five episodes of the series, commending it for tackling "tough questions of human nature" but noting its similarities to The X-Files episode "Beyond the Sea" which also cast Brad Dourif. At io9, this episode was listed as one of the "must watch" episodes from season two of the show. The Digital Fix said that Tuvok's confrontation with Suder was the best scene in season two, and praised Brad Dourif's acting performance as Suder.
