= Investigations (Star Trek: Voyager) =

- Star Trek: Voyager episode
- Episode no.: Season 2 Episode 20
- Directed by: Les Landau
- Story by: Ed Bond; Jeff Schnaufer
- Teleplay by: Jeri Taylor
- Cinematography by: Marvin V. Rush
- Production code: 135
- Original air date: March 13, 1996

Guest appearances
- Raphael Sbarge - Michael Jonas; Martha Hackett - Seska; Jerry Sroka - Laxeth; Simon Billig - Hogan; Prince Abdullah of Jordan (later King)

Episode chronology
← Previous "Lifesigns"	Next → "Deadlock"
- Star Trek: Voyager season 2

"Investigations" is the 36th episode of Star Trek: Voyager, the 20th episode of the second season. The episode aired on UPN on March 13, 1996.

Set in the late 24th century, the series follows the crew of the starship USS Voyager, after the ship was displaced to the Delta Quadrant, far from the rest of the Federation. The episode centers around the character Neelix, who while investigating for a report shared on his new daily broadcast to the crew, stumbles upon a traitor who is sending coded messages to the Kazon. A comic subplot involves the Doctor's attempts at getting his medical segments included in Neelix's daily broadcast.

== Plot ==
Morale Officer Neelix starts a ship-wide information broadcast aboard Voyager as an attempt to raise crew-morale. However, his initial reports are somewhat downbeat as he shares the news that helmsman Tom Paris (whose conduct has become increasingly erratic through several preceding episodes) is to leave the ship permanently to join a Talaxian convoy.

It emerges that someone on board Voyager has been sending information to an enemy-race, the Kazon. After Seska and the Kazon abduct Tom Paris from the Talaxian ship, Neelix suggests on his broadcast that it was Paris who had betrayed them all. Captain Janeway privately reveals to Neelix that Paris's insubordination, departure and joining the Kazon was all part of an act to flush out a suspected traitor on board. The Maquis members of the crew, including Commander Chakotay, had not been told as it was suspected that the traitor was from the Maquis. She asks Neelix to use his new journalistic role to investigate.

Neelix eventually discovers that the real traitor is Michael Jonas, a Maquis engineer. Jonas locks down Engineering, injures Neelix, and attempts to draw Voyager into a trap laid by Kazon forces. Neelix recovers and attacks Jonas, who falls over a second-floor railing and is disintegrated by plasma leakage below. Tom Paris returns after damaging the Kazon ship and stealing a shuttle. He explains and apologizes to the crew for his recent behavior, revealing that it was a ruse that he and the captain had planned to infiltrate the Kazon and flush the intruder many weeks ago. Later, Chakotay expresses his disappointment about the deception being planned without his knowledge.

== Royal cameo ==
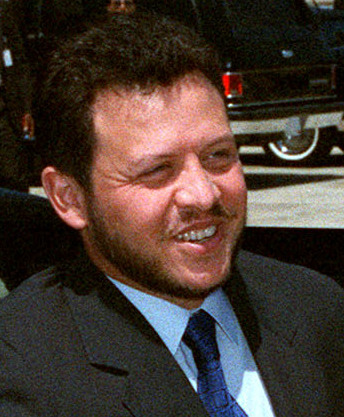
The then-Prince Abdullah II of Jordan (pictured in 1999) made a cameo appearance in the episode "Investigations".

The then-Prince Abdullah, now King Abdullah II of Jordan, a fan of the show, appears as a non-speaking character. He is glimpsed in the first few minutes – in the cold opening (teaser) - playing an unnamed science officer standing before Ensign Harry Kim during the apparent tail-end of a conversation just before Neelix arrives to speak with Kim. Not being a member of Screen Actors Guild, Abdullah was not permitted to have any spoken lines.
