= Suldan =

Suldan (Persian: سولدان) may refer to:

- Suldan, Chabahar
- Suldan, Rask
