= Vidiians =

Fictional alien race in the Star Trek franchise

A Vidiian character featured on Star Trek: Voyager suffering from The Phage.

The Vidiians are a fictional alien race in the Star Trek franchise. Developed by Star Trek: Voyager series' co-creators Rick Berman, Michael Piller, and Jeri Taylor, they serve as recurring antagonists during the show's first two seasons. They are represented as a nomadic species suffering from a pandemic known as the Phage, which destroys their tissue. A society with highly developed medical technology, the Vidiians harvest organs from corpses and living beings to stall the progression of the Phage, and experiment on other alien species in an attempt to develop a cure. Vidiian storylines frequently revolve around the aliens' attempts to take Voyager crew members' organs, though a Vidiian scientist named Danara Pel serves as a love interest for The Doctor. The alien species have made minor appearances in the show's subsequent seasons, and have been included in novels set in the Star Trek universe.

Inspired by the Maya civilization, the bubonic plague, and Mary Shelley's novel Frankenstein, the Vidiians were seen by the show's co-creators as a way to honor Gene Roddenberry's approach to portraying well-developed antagonists in the Star Trek franchise. The Vidiians were presented as one of three new alien species that could be expanded as recurring antagonists; the other two were the Kazon and the Sikarians. The concept for the Phage as a bacteriophage was decided through a collaboration between science consultant André Bormanis and the show's producers. Michael Westmore was the primary make-up supervisor involved in the creation of the Vidiians' appearance. The make-up and prosthetics for the Vidiians were extensive, requiring actors to wear head masks, contacts, and dentures. The Vidiians received a generally positive response from critics who praised them as successfully bringing horror themes to the series.

== Appearances ==
=== Star Trek: Voyager ===
The Vidiians appear as recurring antagonists during Star Trek: Voyager's first two seasons. The crew of the USS Voyager first encounters the alien species in the season one episode "Phage", in which the Talaxian Neelix (Ethan Phillips) has his lungs stolen by two Vidiians, Dereth (Cully Fredricksen) and Motura (Stephen Rappaport). After Captain Kathryn Janeway (Kate Mulgrew) pursues the Vidiians to recover Neelix's organs, the Vidiians explain that their entire species has been infected by a pandemic known as the Phage. They have developed advanced medical technology to remotely harvest organs directly from living humanoids in order to stop the progression of the Phage, which causes tissue to disintegrate on a cellular level. Motura informs Janeway that he has already implanted Neelix's lungs into his own body, but these cannot be removed without killing him, to which he agrees. Faced with a moral dilemma, Janeway refuses his offer and allows both Dereth and Motura to leave. She instructs them to tell the other Vidiians that any attempt to take another organ from Voyager's crew will be met with deadly force. Dereth and Motura perform an operation and adapt a lung from Kes (Jennifer Lien), an Ocampa and Neelix's romantic partner, to make for a compatible donation aligned with Neelix's physiology. They are able to successfully implant the lung into Neelix's body.

In "Faces", Lieutenants Tom Paris (Robert Duncan McNeill), B'Elanna Torres (Roxann Dawson), and Peter Durst (Brian Markinson) are kidnapped by the Vidiians. Paris and Durst are forced to work in mines while waiting to have their organs harvested. Vidiian Chief Surgeon Sulan (also played by Markinson) experiments on Torres to find a cure for the Phage, since her Klingon genetic structure has an immunity to the disease. The procedure splits Torres into two bodies (a full-blooded Klingon and a full-blooded human); Sulan conducts further experiments on the Klingon Torres while the Human Torres is forced to work in the mines. Sulan kills Durst and grafts his face on top of his own. Commander Chakotay (Robert Beltran), Lieutenant Commander Tuvok (Tim Russ), and Ensign Harry Kim (Garrett Wang), who had formed a search party to locate the missing crew members, but upon encountering armed guards are forced to turn back. Chakotay, however returns, now disguised as a Vidiian guard with the help of Tuvok and The Doctor (Robert Picardo), helps to rescue Torres; the Doctor combines both versions of Torres back together.

During "Lifesigns", the crew responds to a distress call and attempts to help a Vidiian scientist Danara Pel (Susan Diol). The Doctor creates a holographic body for Pel in order to work with her to develop a cure for the Phage. Despite the Vidiians' mistreatment of Torres in "Faces", she eventually agrees to provide a sample of her Klingon DNA for their experiments. During their collaboration, the Doctor develops romantic feelings for Pel, and the pair go on a date in the holodeck. When Pel's condition deteriorates rapidly, she decides to stay in her new holographic body so that she can remain alive for several days with the Doctor, rather than return to her own Phage-ravaged body. The Doctor convinces Pel to transfer her consciousness back into her body and the couple dance before Pel departs Voyager.

Vidiians make minor appearances in "Deadlock" and "Resolutions". In "Deadlock", Janeway orders Tom Paris to direct Voyager into a nebula to prevent detection from two nearby Vidiian planets. The starship and its crew are duplicated due to a space-time rift. Several Vidiians attack one of the copies of Voyager and harvest vital organs from members of its crew. The Janeway captaining the invaded ship stops the invasion by self-destructing the Voyager in question. This kills the Vidiians and the crew of that Voyager, excepting Harry Kim and the newborn Naomi Wildman; their counterparts having died, they change ships before the self-destruct completes. Pel returns in "Resolutions" to provide a cure for Janeway and Chakotay, who are infected with a terminal illness. Other Vidiians launch an ambush attack during the exchange, but Voyager manages to escape with the serum for Janeway and Chakotay.

The Vidiians are referenced and seen in several subsequent episodes. In "Coda", Janeway finds herself caught in a time loop after a group of Vidiians kill her during an away mission. All of Janeway's experiences in the time loop, as well as her death, are explained to be the result of hallucinations caused by an alien disguised as the spirit of her dead father, Admiral Janeway (Len Cariou). In "Think Tank", Janeway learns that a cure for the Phage has been developed by a committee of alien intellectuals. The Vidiians make their final appearance during an alternative timeline in "Fury". During this episode, Kes returns to Voyager (she had left at the beginning of the fourth season when the development of her psionic powers threatened the starship and its crew). Kes has forgotten the reason for her earlier departure, blaming the crew for abandoning her. After traveling to the past, she contacts the Vidiians and tells them that she will help them commandeer Voyager if they escort her past self back to her home planet. The future version of Kes is killed by Janeway during the Vidiians' attack, and her past version makes a holographic message to prevent the events from occurring. The final mention of the Vidiians occurs in the season six episode "Good Shepherd" as one of the various alien species that have threatened Voyager in the past.

=== Other appearances ===
The Vidiians have appeared in original fiction based on the Star Trek franchise. For example, in Shadow of Heaven, Danara Pel is captured by an alien species, who desire vengeance against the Vidiians for their past organ-harvesting operations. Kes rescues Pel by using her psionic powers. In the alternative universe presented in the short story "Places of Exile", the Doctor and Pel are the ones who have created the cure for the Phage. In this interpretation, the Vidiians form a more diplomatic bond with Voyager's crew and promise to help expedite their return to the Alpha Quadrant.

Several pieces of merchandise related to the Vidiians were also released following their debut. In 1996, an action figure of a Vidiian was released as part of a second wave of Playmates Toys' Star Trek merchandise. A figure of a Vidiian starship was also released by WizKids. The Vidiians have not been featured in Star Trek Online, a massively multiplayer online role-playing game (MMORPG), but a writer from Cryptic Studios presented in a 2013 article that they may be one potential alien species to be included in future updates.

== History and culture ==
In the Star Trek universe, roughly 2,000 years prior to the arrival of Voyager in the Delta Quadrant, the Vidiian Sodality was a culture driven by "educators, artists, and explorers". The book Star Trek: Star Charts identifies the Vidiians' homeworld as Vidiia Prime, the central planet of the Vidiia system and a Class M planet. The spread of the Phage, resulting in thousands of Vidiians dying every day, pushed the alien race to harvest organs and tissue from corpses as well as living beings.

The Vidiians developed advanced medical technology to counteract the spread and progression of the disease, such as their use of a "combined weapon, medical scanner, and surgical instrument" and knowledge of immunogenicity. They also experimented on other alien species in an attempt to find a cure for the Phage. The Vidiians developed methods for interspecies organ transplants. Despite their technological advancements, this alien species is shown to be unfamiliar with holographic technology and engines powered by dilithium.

The Vidiians' culture also shifts as a result of the Phage. In Vidiian society, an individual would hire a specialist, or a honatta, to find the required organs or tissues. Extended periods of contact or group meetings are strongly discouraged to prevent the further spread of the Phage, and those infected are shunned by healthy Vidiians out of fear of contamination. The Vidiians also capture other species to work for them as slaves doing manual tasks, such as mining. In the years following Voyager's encounters with the Vidiians but prior to their return to Earth, a committee of alien intellectuals known as the Think Tank claimed to have cured the Phage.

== Background ==
=== Concept and creation ===
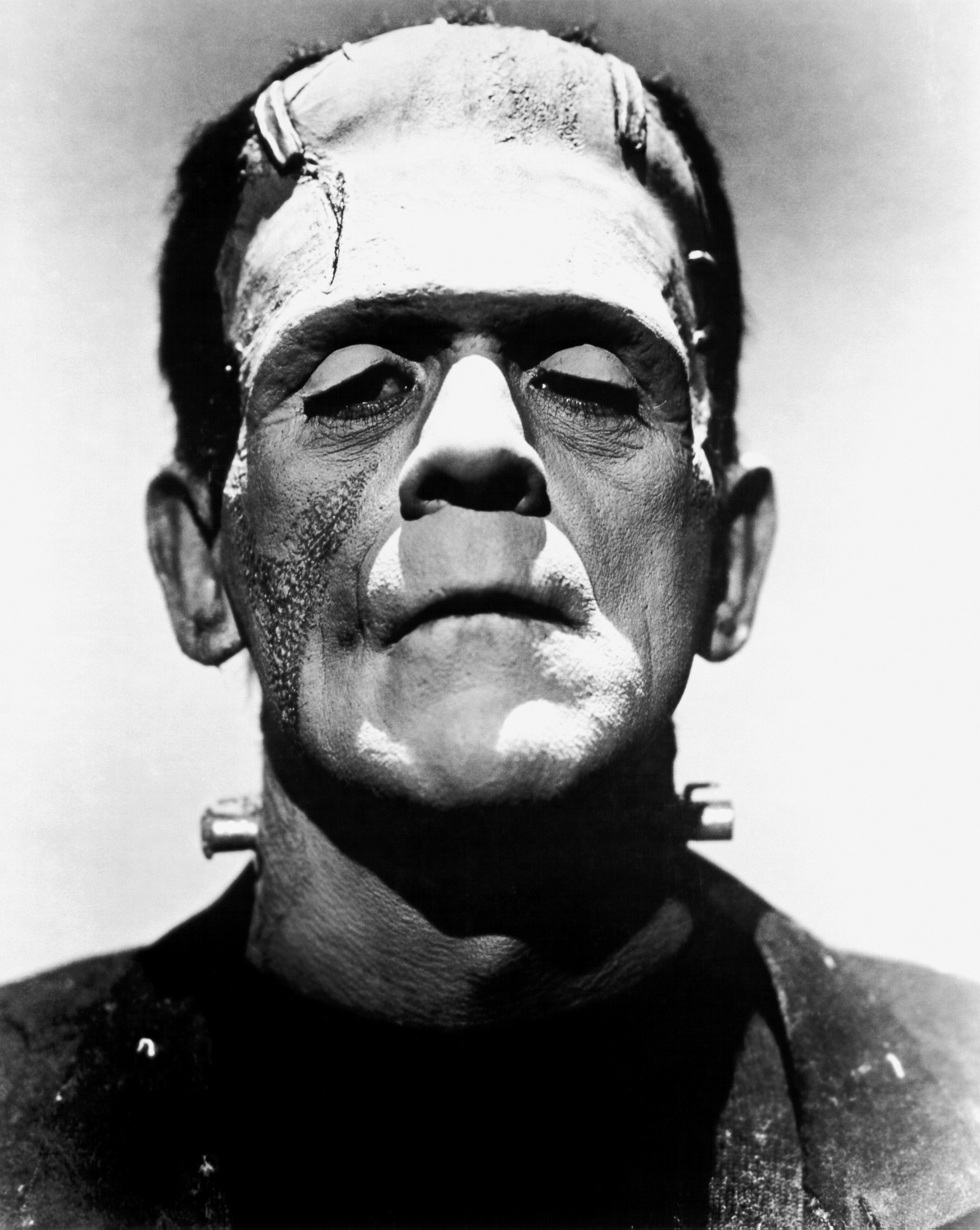
The concept and design of the Vidiians was partially inspired by Frankenstein's monster.

Prior to the announcement of a new Star Trek incarnation, Star Trek: Voyager's co-creators Rick Berman, Michael Piller, and Jeri Taylor conceived of the basic concepts and characters during secret developmental meetings. Taylor, Piller, and producer Brannon Braga developed the premise behind the Phage and the Vidiians' motives for harvesting organs from discussing ideas that fulfilled the following questions: "Who's interesting? What's interesting? What's an agenda we find interesting?" According to Taylor, the Vidiians were first imagined from an "idea of a culture that was dying of an incurable virus that would go to any lengths to make themselves and their species stay alive".

Taylor originally envisioned the Vidiians as reminiscent of the Maya civilization, especially relative to practices of human sacrifice and cannibalism. Braga, however, has connected the alien species to European history, questioning if Europeans would have pursued similar methods if the bubonic plague had persisted as a pandemic. Braga stated that the Vidiians were partially inspired by Mary Shelley's novel Frankenstein, emphasizing that he wanted to portray them as sympathetic. In his book Star Trek: Parallel Narratives, Chris Gregory attributes the development of the Vidiians to Braga's affinity for the horror genre.

During the writing and development of the episode "Faces", executive story editor Kenneth Biller had difficulty writing the primary Vidiian character as a sympathetic villain. He looked to Gene Roddenberry's approach to portraying antagonists in the Star Trek franchise: "[A]liens should never be patently evil. They may have a set of values that differ from our own, but be careful of making them mustache-twirling villains." Taylor used the following description to summarize the show's approach to the alien species:

The idea of a race that does really unspeakably horrible things but does them simply because they're trying to survive, we thought was a very complex kind of agenda [....] If you start with a premise like that, it's impossible to make them completely evil because their motivation is completely understandable. If anything, it's more scary if you realize that underneath that grotesque, deformed body there's someone who was once young, strong and beautiful.

Initially called the "Phages", the show's producers changed the alien species' name to the "Vaphorans". Following the completion of the script for the debut episode, the species' name was revised again to "Vidiians" to prevent potential pronunciation issues for the cast. Introduced in the first season, the Vidiians were developed as one of three new alien species that could be used as recurring antagonists; the other two were the Kazon and the Sikarians. The Vidiians and the Kazon would be featured in later episodes, while the appearance of the Sikarians was restricted to the episode "Prime Factors".

Through a collaboration with science consultant André Bormanis, the producers established the Phage as a bacteriophage. During a behind-the-scenes feature included on the DVD release of the show's second season, Bormanis explained that the writers and producers paid close attention to imagining a virus that could believably almost exterminate an entire species. Both Piller and Braga responded positively to Taylor's concept of the Vidiians. Piller viewed the idea of "an alien culture who are a civilized people who are forced to do uncivilized things in order to survive" as a compelling plot point. Braga agreed with Piller's assessment, saying: "Very rarely do you stumble on something that has real resonance." Freelance writer Skye Dent, who had helped with the original development of the Vidiians, felt that pride characterized the alien species. She explained: "[E]ven though they knew what they were doing was wrong in terms of the actual action, they were very confident that because they were culturally superior, they were totally justified in killing people and taking their organs".

=== Design and casting ===
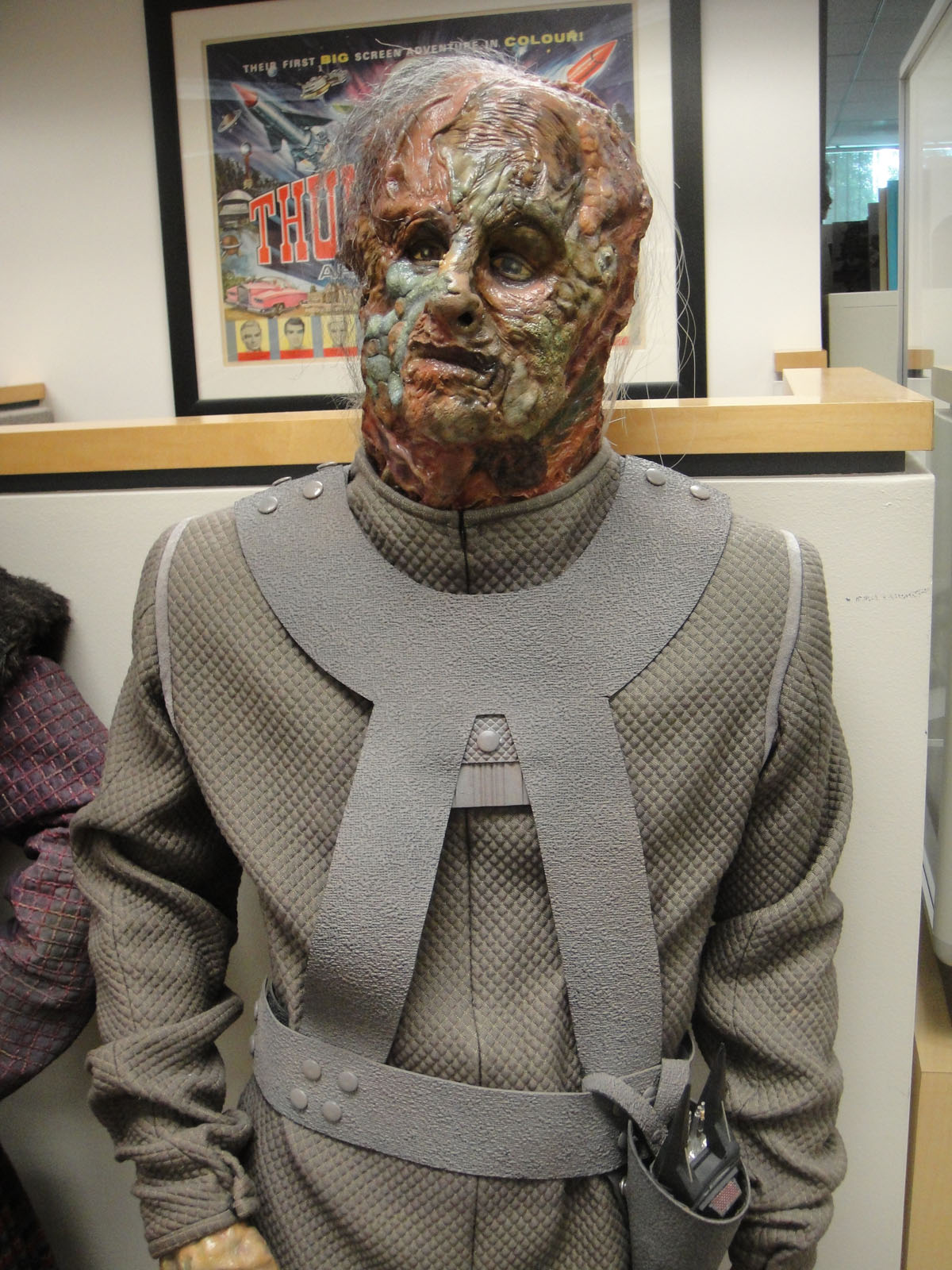
A mannequin is shown wearing the Vidiian prosthetic make-up at a Profiles in History exhibit.

The series' make-up supervisor Michael Westmore was heavily involved in the creation of the Vidiians' look. Taylor worked closely with Westmore to ensure that the Vidiians bore no resemblance to previous alien species featured in the Star Trek franchise. According to Westmore, the script for the episode "Phage" called for the species to appear like "a race of people whose skin and organs were rotting". The series' make-up supervisors based the Vidiians' design on patchwork quilts, specifically in the way their bodies were composed of various harvested body parts and organs along with their own decomposing skin.

Created as a mask covering the entirety of the actor's head, the prosthetic make-up includes pieces from other alien species, such as Talaxians and the Kazon, to represent the Vidiians' long history of taking organs from humanoids in multiple areas of the Delta Quadrant. Along with the mask, actors portraying Vidiians would wear contact lenses and dentures. Robert Beltran said he felt uncomfortable while acting in the facial mask during the filming of the disguised Chakotay in "Faces". He described the prosthetic as giving him a "raw, wounded face, which made [him] feel very vulnerable as a person", and viewed it as an acting challenge.

Following an extensive casting process, American actress Susan Diol was selected to play Danara Pel. Diol had previously appeared in the Star Trek: The Next Generation episode "Silicon Avatar" as engineer Carmen Davila. Robert Picardo praised her performance, noting that she "miraculously side-stepped all of the pitfalls of that role, which were abject pity". Taylor developed Danara Pel as a way to explore the morality behind treating terminally ill individuals, while Picardo approached the character as a meditation on the role of physical appearance in romantic relationships. He explained his interpretation of the Doctor's romance with Pel:

He falls in love with the real her, the horrifyingly deformed her, not this beautiful, radiant holographic being that is trapped inside her. So there are [...] analogies for life in the Doctor's discoveries – in that particular case, learning to love the inner person and not to be distracted in love by someone's physical exterior.

== Response ==
=== Cast and crew response ===
The Vidiians' debut in "Phage" received primarily positive responses from Voyager's cast and crew. Kate Mulgrew praised the moment in which Janeway had to choose between "sacrificing Neelix's lungs or allowing another species to continue to survive". She viewed Janeway's initial difficulty with approaching the Vidiians about the subject of ethics as showcasing a level of "poignancy". While discussing the alien species introduced in the early seasons of Voyager, Westmore said that he found the Vidiians to have the most compelling design. He described them as "the most interesting ones that we've run into as far as a new concept and look, and something totally different", highlighting their use of horror conventions. Taylor praised Westmore's work representing the Vidiians as "truly grisly-looking people" without turning them into flat or static characters. Skye Dent had a more critical opinion of the episode, saying that alterations made to her first draft of the script weakened the effectiveness of the alien species as antagonists. She felt that they "just seemed very wimpy to me, even though they were saying the same dialogue I had written".

The series' producers and writers also commented on the inclusion of the Vidiians in the episode "Faces". Piller, Braga, and Taylor praised executive producer Rick Berman's decision to reformat the Torres' storyline with the inclusion of the Vidiians. Dent was impressed by the episode's representation of the alien species, and felt it was an improvement over her initial concepts. While discussing the representation of the Vidiians, Biller highlighted the scene in which Vidiian scientist Sulan transplants the face of Lieutenant Peter Durst (also played by Markinson) onto his own, and referred to it as "my classic moment in Voyager first season".

=== Critical reception ===
The Vidiians have received positive feedback from television critics. Marc Buxton of the website Den of Geek! included the Vidiians on his list of the 50 best alien life forms in the Star Trek universe, describing them as "Wes Craven nightmares". While commenting on the episode "Lifesigns", TrekToday's Michelle Erica Green questioned the show's decision to focus on the Kazon and described the Vidiians as a more suitable and compelling candidate to serve as the primary antagonists for the first two seasons. Today's Ree Hines called the Vidiians one of the greatest Star Trek villains, writing that "their method of organ extraction upped the fear factor" and made them unsympathetic.

Jamahl Epsicokhan of Jammer's Reviews commended the development of the Vidiians in "Faces", writing that they were portrayed as complex villains. Even though he felt that the Vidiians had a compelling premise, he criticized their repeated appearances as distracting from the series' story arc of a lost crew on a journey home. Juliette Harrison of Den of Geek! ranked Susan Diol's performance as Danara Pel as one of the top ten guest performances on Star Trek: Voyager. Pel's storyline was praised by Harrison as portraying "the on-going effects of chronic illness on the sufferer's sense of self"; for Harrison, Diol approached the role through "carefully understated but heartfelt reactions to her situation".

=== Academic analysis ===
A number of academics have identified the Vidiians as potentially adversely influencing public knowledge and perceptions of scientific issues, including genetics and organ donation. Clarence Spiger and colleagues, in a study of student perceptions of organ donations, highlighted the Vidiians as an example of a problematic source of information about the topic on television, a medium which many participants had identified as a key source for their understanding. "We can only speculate", they wrote, "that students' responses could have been indirectly or subconsciously influenced through the viewing of such programming."

Literary critic John Kenneth Muir wrote that the Vidiians were an example of the prevalence of organ harvesting story arcs in science fiction, comparing them to characters in the British television shows UFO, Space: 1999, and Blake's 7. He also questioned the connection between storylines such as the Vidiians to the spread of urban legends involving organ trafficking. In his 2016 The Politics of Star Trek, political scientist George A. Gonzalez argued that the Vidiians served as a critique of realpolitik. He described the alien species as built on an "intersubjective agreement that does not recognize the rights of others to their bodies/organs".

Scholar Karin Blair interpreted the Doctor's dance with Pel, which she described as "the Vidiian 'collection of spare parts'", as one example of how Voyager focused on a "more bounded word, a stable dwelling or memories of home" as opposed to the emphasis on "pluralism and open-ended diversity" in Star Trek: The Original Series and Star Trek: The Next Generation. Blair wrote that Pel provided a glimpse into the Vidiians' appearance prior to the Phage, noting that she had a stronger set of morals than the Vidiians featured in previous episodes.
