= Resurrection Blvd. =

American drama television series (2000–2002)

- Created by: Dennis E. Leoni
- Starring: Michael DeLorenzo; Nicholas Gonzalez; Ruth Livier; Mauricio Mendoza; Elizabeth Peña
- Music by: Joseph Julián González
- Country of origin: United States
- No. of seasons: 3
- No. of episodes: 53

Production
- Executive producers: Dennis E. Leoni; Robert Eisele
- Running time: 60 minutes
- Production companies: Patagonia House; Viacom Productions

Original release
- Network: Showtime
- Release: June 26, 2000 – September 18, 2002

Resurrection Blvd. is an American drama television series that aired on Showtime for three seasons from June 26, 2000, to September 18, 2002.

== Plot ==
In East Los Angeles, California, the Santiago family has had three generations of boxers within the family. They continue their battle to become boxing champions while struggling with the difficulties of making life choices and breaking away from family tradition. Roberto Santiago (Tony Plana) is ill and struggles as he watches his family cope with the various hardships they must face.

== Cast ==
- Michael DeLorenzo as Carlos Santiago
- Nicholas Gonzalez as Alex Santiago
- Ruth Livier as Yolanda Santiago
- Mauricio Mendoza as Miguel Santiago
- Marisol Nichols as Victoria Santiago
- Tony Plana as Roberto Santiago
- Elizabeth Peña as Beatrice "Bibi" Corrales
- Daniel Zacapa as Ruben Santiago
- Brian Austin Green as Luke Bonner

== Episodes ==
=== Season 1 (2000–01) ===
No. overall	No. in season	Title	Directed by	Written by	Original release date
1	1	"Pilot"	Jesús Salvador Treviño	Dennis E. Leoni	June 26, 2000
2	2	"Pilot"	Jesús Salvador Treviño	Dennis E. Leoni	June 26, 2000
3	3	"Sueños"	Jesús Salvador Treviño	Dennis E. Leoni	July 3, 2000
4	4	"El Baile"	Jeremy Kagan	Robert Eisele	July 10, 2000
5	5	"El Regreso de Paco"	Jesús Salvador Treviño	Jack LoGiudice	July 17, 2000
6	6	"Negro y Moreno"	Reynaldo Villalobos	Joshua Stern	July 24, 2000
7	7	"Dos Padres"	Jesús Salvador Treviño	Maria Elena Rodriguez	July 31, 2000
8	8	"Luchando"	Jeremy Kagan	Adam Fierro	August 7, 2000
9	9	"Cholitas"	Jesús Salvador Treviño	Rosemary Alderete	August 14, 2000
10	10	"Mascaras"	Kenny Ortega	Jorge A. Reyes	August 21, 2000
11	11	"Hermanos"	Nancy Malone	Walter Halsey Davis	August 28, 2000
12	12	"Aniversario"	John Behring	Jack LoGiudice	September 4, 2000
13	13	"Comenzando de Nuevo"	Jesús Salvador Treviño	Dennis E. Leoni & Joshua Stern	September 11, 2000
14	14	"Revelaciones"	Nancy Malone	Adam Fierro	December 4, 2000
15	15	"Las Manos de Piedra"	Norberto Barba	Maria Elena Rodriguez	December 11, 2000
16	16	"No Te Muevas"	Jeremy Kagan	Jorge A. Reyes	December 18, 2000
17	17	"Lagrimas en el Cielo"	Sylvia Morales	Joshua Stern	January 1, 2001
18	18	"La Visita"	John Behring	Jack LoGiudice	January 8, 2001
19	19	"Un Pacto con el Diablo"	Norberto Barba	Adam Fierro	January 15, 2001
20	20	"Juntos"	Norberto Barba	Dennis E. Leoni & Joshua Stern	January 22, 2001

=== Season 2 (2001) ===
No. overall	No. in season	Title	Directed by	Written by	Original release date
21	1	"Arriba y Abajo"	Unknown	Unknown	June 26, 2001
22	2	"La Agonia y el Extasis"	Unknown	Unknown	July 3, 2001
23	3	"Diez y Ocho"	Unknown	Unknown	July 10, 2001
24	4	"Secretos, Mentiras y Expectativas"	Unknown	Unknown	July 17, 2001
25	5	"Los Guardias"	Unknown	Unknown	July 24, 2001
26	6	"Sangre de la Mano"	Unknown	Unknown	July 31, 2001
27	7	"Con Cuidado"	Unknown	Unknown	August 7, 2001
28	8	"Mano a Mano"	Unknown	Unknown	August 14, 2001
29	9	"El Que Necesita"	Unknown	Unknown	August 21, 2001
30	10	"Partida"	Unknown	Unknown	August 28, 2001
31	11	"Mi Padre"	Unknown	Unknown	September 4, 2001
32	12	"El Mejor Amigo del Hombre"	Unknown	Unknown	September 11, 2001
33	13	"La Nina Perdida"	Unknown	Unknown	September 18, 2001
34	14	"Lito"	Unknown	Unknown	September 25, 2001
35	15	"A Puro Dolor"	Unknown	Unknown	October 2, 2001
36	16	"Saliendo"	Unknown	Unknown	October 9, 2001
37	17	"Bruja"	Michael DeLorenzo	Adam Fierro	October 16, 2001
38	18	"Compadres"	Dennis E. Leoni	Dennis E. Leoni and Luisa Leshin	October 23, 2001
39	19	"Ansiedad"	Unknown	Unknown	October 30, 2001
40	20	"La Gran Pelea"	Unknown	Unknown	November 6, 2001

=== Season 3 (2002) ===
No. overall	No. in season	Title	Directed by	Written by	Original release date
41	1	"En Un Momento"	John Behring	Dennis E. Leoni	June 26, 2002
42	2	"Esperando Lagrimas"	Unknown	Unknown	July 3, 2002
43	3	"La Guerra de Bibi"	Nancy Malone	Unknown	July 10, 2002
44	4	"Un Miembro de la Familia"	Unknown	Unknown	July 17, 2002
45	5	"Nino del Polvo"	Dennis E. Leoni	Robert Eisele	July 24, 2002
46	6	"Las Tristesas de Zeke"	Unknown	Unknown	July 31, 2002
47	7	"Justicia"	Unknown	Unknown	August 7, 2002
48	8	"Pararse"	Unknown	Unknown	August 14, 2002
49	9	"El Gato, El Vato, La Cena y El Padre"	Michael DeLorenzo	Adam Fierro	August 21, 2002
50	10	"Engano"	Unknown	Unknown	August 28, 2002
51	11	"Un Amigo Viejo"	Unknown	Unknown	September 4, 2002
52	12	"Verguenza"	Unknown	Unknown	September 11, 2002
53	13	"Resureccion"	Unknown	Unknown	September 18, 2002
