= Bad City Blues =

1999 film

- Directed by: Michael Stevens; Tim Willocks
- Written by: Tim Willocks
- Produced by: Michael Stevens
- Starring: Michael Massee; Michael McGrady; Judith Hoag; Jim Metzler; Simon Billig; Earl Holliman; Dennis Hopper; Ruth Livier; Scott MacDonald; Virginia Capers; Bob Clendenin; Rob Benedict
- Cinematography: Zoran Popovic
- Edited by: John Ganem
- Music by: Serge Colbert; Max Middleton; Mick Taylor
- Release date: 26 October 1999
- Running time: 116 minutes
- Country: United States
- Language: English

Bad City Blues is a 1999 American crime drama film directed by Michael Stevens.This film starring Michael Massee, Michael McGrady, Judith Hoag, Jim Metzler and Simon Billig in the lead roles.

== About the film ==
Adapted from a novel by British author Tim Willocks, this is a crime film about redemption and revenge. There are four stories woven together which originate from a bank robbery gone wrong. The wife of the banker is also the girlfriend of the gang leader who is behind the robbery. She becomes injured and begs the town doctor for help. A corrupt police captain in town kills her banker-husband and then focuses on the town doctor to get to the robbers. It was described by The Los Angeles Times as a dark gritty film about a bank heist gone wrong.

== Production ==
The film was directed by Michael Stevens who along with Tim Willocks produced it. The executive producer was Tom Scott. The music for the film is by Mick Taylor.

== Reception ==
The film premiered at the El Capitan Theatre in Los Angeles.

== Cast ==
Cast
Name	Role	Notes #
Michael Massee	Dr. Eugene Grimes	
Judith Hoag	Calilou Carter	
Jim Metzler	Luther Logan	
Simon Billig	Artie	
Earl Holliman	Joe Gags	
Dennis Hopper	Cleveland Carter	
Ruth Livier	Dolores	
Scott MacDonald	Mack	
Virginia Capers	Mrs. Green	
Rob Benedict	Tommy	
