= Albie Selznick =

American film and television actor (born 1959)

- Born: Albert Selesnick; January 1, 1959 (age 66); Los Angeles County, California

Albie Selznick (born January 1, 1959) is an American film and television actor. His best-known role is Ben Rubenstein on the sitcom Suddenly Susan and D.A. Owen Pomerantz on The Young and the Restless.

He has guest starred and recurred in several other TV series, including The Politician, The Last Tycoon, Grey's Anatomy, How To Get Away With Murder, Dexter, Shark, NCIS, 24, Desperate Housewives, Cold Case, Without A Trace, Star Trek: The Next Generation, Star Trek: Voyager, The King of Queens, NYPD Blue, CSI: Miami, CSI:NY, CSI: Crime Scene Investigation, The West Wing, Everwood, The Young and the Restless, Veronica Mars, Night Court, and others. Albie started his performance career as magician and worked with The Mums for 25 years.

== Filmography ==
=== Film ===
Year	Title	Role	Notes
1980	Xanadu	Tightrope Walker	
1984	Breakin' 2: Electric Boogaloo	The Mums	Specialty Act
1987	Aria	Bell Boy	Segment "Rigoletto"
1991	Ricochet	Blake's Lawyer	
1993	Nowhere to Run	Hales Associate	
1993	Best of the Best 2	Man in Crowd	
1994	Beverly Hills Cop III	Technician	
2000	What's Cooking?	Art Seelig	
2005	Herstory	Steve	
2006	10 Tricks	The Magician	
2008	Player 5150	Phil	
2009	Morris County	Noah	
2019	Loqueesha	George	

=== Television ===
Year	Title	Role	Notes
1984	Faerie Tale Theatre	The Mums	Episode: "The Boy Who Left Home to Find Out About the Shivers"
1986	The Twilight Zone	Mannequin #1	Episode: "The After Hours/Lost and Found/The World Next Door"
1987	The Charmings	The Mums (Juggler)	Episode: "The Mirror Cracked"
1988	Beauty and the Beast	Zeke	Episode: "The Alchemist"
1988	Hooperman		Episode: "Trudy and Clyde"
1989	Tour of Duty	Chambers	Episode: "The Luck"
1989	Freddy's Nightmares	The Mime Kip	Episode: "Silence Is Golden"
1989	Night Court	Hovel Mum	Episode: "Passion Plundered"
1992	Star Trek: The Next Generation	Juggler	Episode: "Cost of Living"
1992	Bodies of Evidence	The Cameraman	Episode: "Nightmoves"
1992	Obsessed	Dr. Irwin	TV movie
1993	Danger Theatre	Raymond Pettigrew	Episode: "Searcher in the Mist/Sex, Lies & Decaf"
1993–1994	Murder, She Wrote	Walter Burger / Marvin Sobel	2 episodes
1994	Columbo	Detective McKittrick	Episode: "Undercover"
1995	NewsRadio	Copy Guy	Episode: "Copy Guy"
1995	Saved by the Bell: The New Class	Gavin Malone	Episode: "Hollywood, Here He Is"
1996	Sisters	Bob	Episode: "Nothing Personal"
1996	Run for the Dream: The Gail Devers Story	ER Doctor	TV movie
1996–1999	Star Trek: Voyager	Tash / Tak Tak	2 episodes
1997	The Single Guy	Director	Episode: "New Year"
1997	Beverly Hills, 90210	Stu	Episode: "Heaven Scent"
1997–1999	Suddenly Susan	Ben Rubenstein	15 episodes
1998	The King of Queens	Evan Lassar	Episode: "Cello, Goodbye"
1999	Vengeance Unlimited		Episode: "Clique"
1999	The Pretender	Agent Tympson	Episode: "The World's Changing"
2000	V.I.P.	Dr. Gilbert Kemper	Episode: "Analyze Val"
2001	CSI: Crime Scene Investigation	Hugh Young	Episode: "Justice Is Served"
2001–2003	NYPD Blue	John Arrascada / James Edelman	3 episodes
2002	CSI: Miami	Jason Caplin	Episode: "Slaughterhouse"
2003	The Division	Marty Wright	Episode: "Radioactive Spider"
2003	10-8: Officers on Duty	Naked Man	Episode: "Blood Sugar Sex Magik"
2004	The West Wing	Documentarian	Episode: "Access"
2004	I'm with Her	Reporter	Episode: "I'm Not with Her"
2004	Strong Medicine	Graham	Episode: "Prophylactic Measures"
2004	Jumbo Girl	Gerald	Short
2004	Cold Case	Paul Kern	Episode: "It's Raining Men"
2005	CSI: NY	John Stupaine	Episode: "Hush"
2005	24	John Reiss	2 episodes
2005	Desperate Housewives	Dennis Stevens	Episode: "There Won't Be Trumpets"
2005	Just Legal	Crown Witness	Episode: "The Runner"
2005	Without a Trace	Phil Hinners	Episode: "Freefall"
2006	E-Ring	Carter Ewing	Episode: "Brothers in Arms"
2006	Everwood	Dr. Albert Franco	2 episodes
2006	NCIS	Marty Allen	Episode: "Faking It"
2007	Shark	Warren Dowd	Episode: "Gangster Movies"
2007	Dexter	Psychiatrist	Episode: "See-Through"
2009	ER	Mr. Lanford	Episode: "I Feel Good"
2009–2011	The Young and the Restless	Detective Owen Pomerantz	59 episodes
2010	Paranormal, Burbank	Uncle Bean	Episode: "The Case of the Mighty Morphin Power Granny"
2011	Southland	Deputy D.A. Charles Atherton	Episode: "Fixing a Hole"
2012	Switched at Birth	Warren	Episode: "Les Soeurs D'Estrees"
2012	Grey's Anatomy	Columbia Rep	Episode: "The Girl with No Name"
2012	Episodes	Golf Coach	Episode: "Episode Five"
2013	Castle	Dr. Paul Devlin	Episode: "The Fast and the Furriest"
2014	Days of Our Lives	Bronson	Episode: "Episode #1.12487"
2015	Crazy Ex-Girlfriend	Stew	Episode: "My Mom, Greg's Mom and Josh's Sweet Dance Moves!"
2016	How to Get Away with Murder	Edith's Lawyer	Episode: "Call It Mother's Intuition"
2016	Code Black	Dr. Silverman	Episode: "Exodus"
2017	The Last Tycoon	John Broca	3 episodes
