= Loqueesha =

2019 American comedy film

- Promotional poster
- Directed by: Jeremy Saville
- Written by: Jeremy Saville; Patrick Doran
- Produced by: Jeremy Saville
- Starring: Jeremy Saville; Susan Diol; Tiara Parker; Albie Selznick; Mara Hall; Dwayne Perkins; Brad Banacka; Savannah Williams; Jay Costelo; Alveraz Ricardez
- Cinematography: Daniel Clarke
- Edited by: Jeremy Saville
- Music by: Brian Salter
- Distributed by: Indie Rights (Amazon Prime Video)
- Release date: May 21, 2019
- Running time: 98 minutes
- Country: United States
- Language: English

Loqueesha is a 2019 American independent comedy film written, produced, directed by, and starring comedian Jeremy Saville. The film tells the story of Joe, a middle-aged, divorced, white bartender who becomes a nationally syndicated radio host by impersonating a black woman.

The film attempts to cover many topics including racism, unemployment, income inequality, suicide, and African American tropes. The film's trailer was released on YouTube on May 11, 2019, prompting a backlash on social media for the film's perceived racism. Other reviewers considered the trailer to simply be a form of shock humor, used as a form of viral marketing. The film had a limited release in theaters on July 12, 2019; it was panned by critics, and has a 0% rating on Rotten Tomatoes. It has since appeared on several lists of the worst films ever made. Saville has not made any films since.

== Synopsis ==
After giving advice to a woman struggling with relationship problems, Joe is encouraged to audition for a local radio time slot. Joe hesitates to apply, but auditions in order to afford to send his son to a private gifted school. After getting rejected by the station, he resubmits an audition recording as Loqueesha, a no-nonsense sassy black woman, and becomes a national success.

== Cast ==
- Jeremy Saville as Joe
- Susan Diol as Cindy
- Tiara Parker as Rachel
- Albie Selznick as George
- Mara Hall as Renee
- Dwayne Perkins as Mason
- Savannah Williams as Crystal
- Thaddeaus Ek as Jason
- Michael Madison as Ken
- Richard Milanesi as Bob
- Herb Mendelsohn as Fred
- Shaw Purnell as Joe's Mom
- Brad Banacka as Don
- Jay Costelo as Sean
- Alveraz Ricardez as Richard

== Release ==
=== Controversy ===
The film's trailer was released on YouTube on May 11, 2019, prompting a backlash on social media for the film's overt racism, sexism, stereotyping and cultural appropriation. In response, Saville tweeted a photograph of himself with Marlon Wayans, referencing the latter's film White Chicks; Wayans said, in return, that he "hated when people tag me in their bullshit. It is annoying as fuck." Dwayne Perkins, one of the black actors in the film, defended the film: "This is a comedy about a guy who does the wrong thing for the right reasons, and the movie really gets into all of it more than the trailer does ... I think you have to withhold judgment until you see the movie, but again, making a mockery wasn't my intention."

==== Attempted submissions to film festivals ====
Promotional material for Loqueesha stated that the film was an "official selection" of the San Luis Obispo International Film Festival (SLOIFF). A February 19 press release by SLOIFF listed Loqueesha in the festival lineup, but SLOIFF later tweeted that the film was never "selected, screened, or given an award at our festival." The film was originally submitted to the George Sidney Independent Film Competition but was rejected. Saville, a resident of Carmel, then submitted it to the "Central Coast Filmmakers Showcase", which is open to residents of Monterey, San Luis Obispo and Santa Barbara counties. After Loqueesha was accepted in this category and the festival guides had been printed, the film was pulled by its producers before the screening. The festival apologized that the film did not receive an adequate vetting process and committed to "installing appropriate measures to see that this unfortunate circumstance does not occur in the future.”

== Reception ==
On the review aggregator website Rotten Tomatoes, 0% of 7 critics' reviews are positive, with an average rating of 2.40/10. Writing for The Guardian, reviewer Joel Golby criticized the quality of the cinematography, audio editing, casting, special effects, and plot of the film, concluding that Loqueesha was "the worst film ever made". Entertainment.ie found the concept of the film difficult to believe and based on the trailer called it "the worst movie of this decade". Cracked called it "Probably The Worst Movie of 2019". It was also on numerous "Worst Movies of the Last Decade" lists.

== See also ==
- List of 21st-century films considered the worst
- List of films with a 0% rating on Rotten Tomatoes
- Soul Man, a 1986 film similar in content
