= Ruth Livier =

American actress

- Occupation: Actress
- Years active: 1994–present
- Website: www.ruthlivier.com (archive)

Ruth Livier is an American actress best known for her role as Yolanda Santiago on the Showtime television series Resurrection Boulevard. Ruth recurred in Beverly Hills, 90210 playing Joy Taylor, Kelly's (Jennie Garth) half-sister. She also had a recurring roles in Soldier of Fortune, Inc., playing the antagonist, Katrina Herrera, and in Weird Science, playing Michael Manasseri's love interest. Other guest starring roles include: Switched at Birth, Haunted (opposite Matthew Fox), NYPD Blue, The Ghost Whisperer, Becker (opposite Ted Danson), and The Pretender.

Her film work includes Sam Raimi's Drag Me To Hell and Doctor Strange in the Multiverse of Madness, Michael Stevens' Bad City Blues, One Last Flight, Game of Life, Ranchero (opposite Danny Trejo) and the Fwak! animated feature Los Campeones de la Lucha Libre. Other voice-over work includes: the 2012 Grammy Award-nominated audio drama The Mark of Zorro, where she played the starring role of Lolita Pulido opposite Val Kilmer as Zorro, several voices on Fox TV's King of the Hill and la quinceañera on Playhouse Disney's Handy Manny. She has also voiced for several video games, including the role of Inspector Carmelita Fox in Sly 3: Honor Among Thieves, as well as various roles in Grand Theft Auto: San Andreas, Saints Row: The Third, and Dead Rising 3.

Theatre credits include work at some of most prestigious theaters in the West Coast including: The premiere play at the Kirk Douglas Theatre (A Perfect Wedding, dir: Gordon Davidson), South Coast Repertory (Lovers & Executioners, dir: Bill Rauch), Long Beach Opera (The Indian Queen, dir: David Schweizer), The Met (Sexo, Pudor y Lagrimas), East LA Classic Theater (A Midsummer Night’s Dream), The Wiltern (Latinologues), The Lillian Theatre (Lost Angeles), Friends and Artists (De Donde?/ Dentity Crisis), Mark Taper Forum's (NWF). Ruth also toured with Mexico's premiere comedian, Eugenio Derbéz, in Rick Najera's Latinologues.

As a writer and New Media producer, Ruth's web series Ylse (www.Ylse.net) garnered her critical praise in addition to the 2010 Imagen Award; the first in Imagen Awards history. Ylse also won Cal State LA's 2009 Reel Rasquache Award for best web series and was a finalist in the NextTV web series competition. Ms. Livier was featured on the cover of the WGA's Written By magazine for being the first person to become a member of the Writers Guild of America through her work in New Media.

== Awards and accolades ==
She has been featured in prominent publications: TV Guide, EMMY magazine, People en Español, Latino Leaders, Hispanic. She has earned a Best Actress ALMA Awards nomination and a win for Resurrection Blvd., received special recognition by the National Hispanic Foundation for the Arts, the Viva Los Niños award from the March of Dimes, the Breakthrough in Entertainment Industry recognition from Lieutenant Governor Cruz Bustamante and the NAMIC Legacy Award (Resurrection Blvd.).

She is a founding member of Inside Out, a successful after- school program for at risk youth. She has been a keynote speaker at the Latina Youth Conference and the Hispanic Lifestyle Conference, a presenter at the NAMIC and the IMAGEN awards, MC’d several events including MALDEF (Los Angeles Gala 2011), the TEJANO MUSIC Awards with Tony Plana and the NALIP conference with Cristian de la Fuente and Nicholas Gonzalez.
