= Sowlan, Qaleh Ganj =

Sowlan صولان
- Village
- Location within Iran
- Coordinates: 27°11′35″N 58°33′56″E
- Country: Iran
- Province: Kerman
- County: Qaleh Ganj
- Bakhsh: Chah Dadkhoda
- Rural District: Chah Dadkhoda

Population (2006)
  - Total: 571
- Time zone: UTC+3:30 (IRST)
  - Summer (DST): UTC+4:30 (IRDT)

Sowlan (Persian: صولان, also Romanized as Sowlān, Sowlon, and Sūlon) is a village in Chah Dadkhoda Rural District, Chah Dadkhoda District, Qaleh Ganj County, Kerman Province, Iran. At the 2006 census, its population was 571, in 137 families.
