= Sowlan, Jiroft =

Sowlan صولان
- Village
- Location within Iran
- Coordinates: 28°56′00″N 57°40′00″E
- Country: Iran
- Province: Kerman
- County: Jiroft
- Bakhsh: Sarduiyeh
- Rural District: Dalfard

Population (2006)
  - Total: 18
- Time zone: UTC+3:30 (IRST)
  - Summer (DST): UTC+4:30 (IRDT)

Sowlan (Persian: صولان, also Romanized as Şowlān) is a village in Dalfard Rural District, Sarduiyeh District, Jiroft County, Kerman Province, Iran. At the 2006 census, its population was 18, in 5 families.
