= Faces (Star Trek: Voyager) =

Season-one Torres-centered episode

- Star Trek: Voyager episode
- Episode no.: Season 1 Episode 14
- Directed by: Winrich Kolbe
- Story by: Jonathan Glassner; Kenneth Biller
- Teleplay by: Kenneth Biller
- Original air date: May 8, 1995
- Running time: 45 minutes

Guest appearances
- Rob LaBelle as Talaxian prisoner; Brian Markinson as Peter Durst & Sulan; Barton Tinapp as Vidiian guard; Joy Kilpatrick as Dawson's double

Episode chronology
← Previous "Cathexis"	Next → "Jetrel"
- Star Trek: Voyager season 1

"Faces" is an episode of the American science fiction television series Star Trek: Voyager. Set in the 24th century, the series follows the adventures of the Starfleet and Maquis crew of the starship USS Voyager after they are stranded in the Delta Quadrant, far from the rest of the Federation. The fourteenth episode of the first season, first broadcast by UPN on May 8, 1995. "Faces", was developed from a story by Jonathan Glassner and Kenneth Biller, Biller also wrote the teleplay, which was directed by Winrich Kolbe.

In this episode, a Vidiian scientist named Sulan (Brian Markinson) captures and performs medical experiments on the half-Klingon, half-human B'Elanna Torres (Roxann Dawson). He separates her into a full-blooded Klingon and a full-blooded human to find a cure for a disease, known as the Phage. The Voyager crew rescues Torres and restores her to her original state, while she attempts to reconcile with her identity as a half-human half-Klingon. The episode guest stars Rob LaBelle as an unnamed Talaxian prisoner. Actress Joy Kilpatrick was cast as Dawson's photo double to avoid a reliance on split screen.

"Faces" was developed as a character study to further explore Torres' internal struggle with her identity. Dawson was originally resistant to the episode, but later identified it as one of her favorite performances, which deepened her understanding of the character and strengthened her acting. Human Torres and Klingon Torres were treated as two separate characters during the development and filming of the episode. Michael Westmore designed the characters' makeup to emphasize the differences between them.

The episode received a Nielsen rating of 6.1/10 ratings share; a drop from the episode broadcast the previous week. "Faces" was generally well received, and Dawson's character and performance were praised. Some critics had a more negative response to the script and the final sequence; fan and reviewers felt Voyager's crew showed a lack of empathy for Torres in the ending. The episode has also been the subject of academic analysis on race.

== Plot ==
Crew members Tom Paris, B'Elanna Torres, and Peter Durst have gone missing on a mission. They have been captured by the Vidiians. Vidiian Chief Surgeon Sulan has conducted a procedure on Torres, changing her from a half-human, half-Klingon hybrid into two bodies (a full-blooded Klingon and a full-blooded human). He infects Klingon Torres with the Phage, a deadly disease that afflicts his species but to which Klingons have a natural immunity, so he can study her genetics. Commander Chakotay, Security Chief Tuvok, and Ensign Harry Kim form a search party but are discovered by the Vidiians and beam back to the USS Voyager. Sulan examines the Klingon Torres while she experiences pain from the Phage. Klingon Torres expresses pride in her Klingon identity, though she remembers hiding her Klingon heritage as a child. Recognizing Sulan's attraction to her, she tries to seduce the scientist and escape, but his desire to find a cure overcomes his lust. The human version of Torres is kept imprisoned with Paris and Durst. Human Torres is characterized as weaker and more timid than her Klingon counterpart, and is deemed too ill to work in the mines. She secretly works on a security console in the barracks in an attempt to contact Voyager but is caught.

Meanwhile, Sulan kills Durst and grafts his face over his own to appear more appealing to the Klingon Torres. Klingon Torres escapes from Sulan's laboratory, and rescues her human version. After arguing about their respective weaknesses, and past expulsion from Starfleet Academy, the two halves formulate a plan. Human Torres suggests shutting down the shields for the complex so that Voyager can transport them to the ship, while the Klingon Torres deals with guards. Chakotay, disguised as a Vidiian guard with the help of the Doctor, breaks into the facility at the same time Torres deactivates the shields. Klingon Torres sacrifices herself to protect the rest of the crew members from Sulan. Transported back to Voyager, Klingon Torres refuses medical help to die an honorable death. The Doctor explains that Human Torres would not survive without her Klingon half and restores her to her original self by reintegrating the Klingon DNA. Human Torres admits to feeling incomplete without her Klingon half. After being restored, she realizes that she will spend the rest of her life dealing with her inner conflict.

== Production ==
=== Development ===
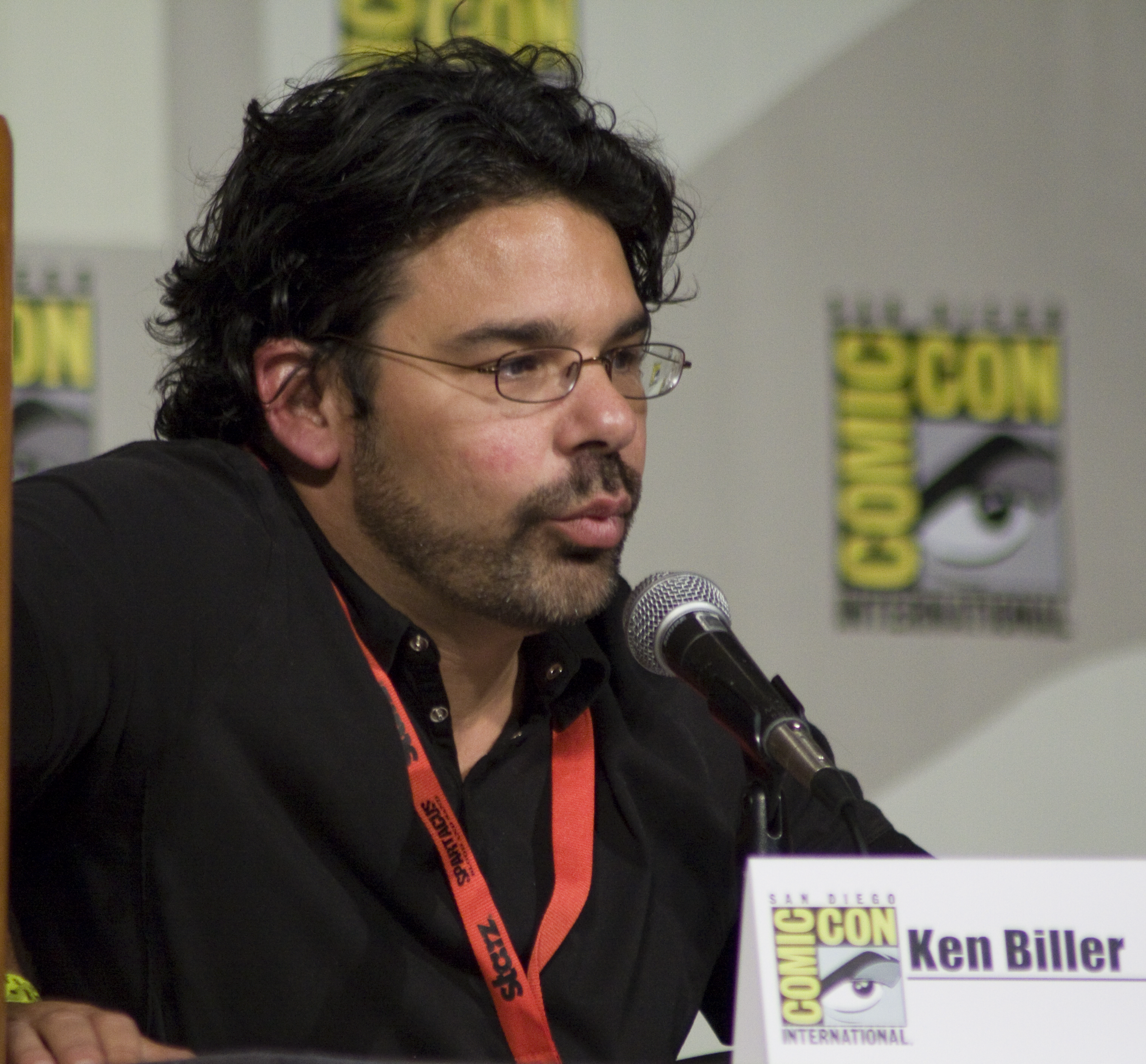
The script for "Faces" was written by Kenneth Biller following the original pitch by Jonathan Glassner.

"Faces" was pitched by writer Jonathan Glassner, and was later revised by executive story editor Kenneth Biller. In an interview with The Official Star Trek: Voyager Magazine, Biller said that the only similarity between the original pitch and the final copy was that the episode deals with the character B'Elanna Torres being split into two parts. In the episode's first draft, aliens used a machine to separate Torres into human and Klingon halves as part of an experiment attempting to achieve purity within a species. Executive producer Michael Piller described the draft as originally focusing on "somebody's idea that this could be the result of a hideous concentration-camp kind of experiment, that is, genetic demonstration of some sort".

Biller and executive producer Jeri Taylor were critical of Glassner's pitch; Biller found it to be "very melodramatic and hokey", and Taylor called it "a tired idea" and "too on the nose for B'Elanna". Producer Brannon Braga explained that the decision to purchase the concept was to do a storyline involving an evil twin in the show's first season, and "get it out of the way". He did feel that the concept could be a mistake, and compared it negatively to a hypothetical storyline in which Star Trek: The Next Generation character Data (Brent Spiner) would be made human. Piller said the episode was almost abandoned, but he believed that the conflict between Torres' human and Klingon halves, and her identity as a woman, would make a worthwhile storyline.

=== Writing ===
The series' writing team were concerned that the episode would be compared to two episodes from Star Trek: The Original Series ("The Enemy Within" and "The Alternative Factor"). Piller added: "[w]e knew we could not do the evil-versus-good story that the original Star Trek had done." Biller was assigned to write the script as his second writing assignment for the series; his first had been for "Elogium". Biller attributed his interest in the episode's concept to his personal experiences with his younger, adopted brother's struggle to understand his biracial identity. Even though Biller was initially critical of the pitch's melodrama, he felt that his version had the melodrama expected of a Star Trek episode. The final draft of the script was submitted on February 24, 1995.

Biller incorporated the Vidiians into the episode, believing that their technology would present a conceivable method by which Torres could be separated. The Vidiians were featured in an earlier season one episode titled "Phage". Biller explained that Klingons were shown to be more resistant to disease than other species in previous Star Trek installments, and reasoned that a Vidiians scientist would view them as a promising way to discover a cure for the disease. Biller said that he had difficulty writing Sulan as a sympathetic villain. He looked to Gene Roddenberry's approach to portraying antagonists in the Star Trek franchise: "[A]liens should never be patently evil. They may have a set of values that differ from our own, but be careful of making them mustache-twirling villains."

Biller viewed the interactions between Sulan and the Klingon version of Torres as being inspired by the fairy tale Beauty and the Beast. He considered a Klingon's strength to be the ideal beauty for a Vidiian, and that Sulan would develop an attraction to Torres. Biller said that the Klingon version of Torres was more manipulative than Beauty from the fairy tale because she uses her sexuality to convince Sulan to follow her demands. Biller believed the episode added more elements of horror to the series, and pointed to the moment when Sulan grafted Durst's face over his own as a "sick moment of inspiration" and a "classic horror movie moment". He felt that Sulan's discomfort with his appearance helped round out his character.

=== Casting and filming ===
Brian Markinson was cast as Sulan, the episode's primary antagonist. Owing to the sequence in which Sulan attaches Durst's face to his own, Markinson was also given the role of Durst. The character was introduced in the preceding episode ("Cathexis") so that he would be a familiar face to the viewers. Rob LaBelle, who was a close friend of Biller, was cast as an unnamed Talaxian prisoner but he concealed the connection during his audition to avoid preferential treatment. LaBelle later appeared in the series as the Takarian servant Kafar in "False Profits" and Talaxian settler Oxilon in "Homestead".

Because of budgetary concerns, "Faces" was produced near the end of the first season. It was originally going to be set in a jungle, but the location was changed to caves after director Winrich Kolbe calculated that the former idea would exceed the episode's budget. "Faces" was the fourth episode of the series Kolbe directed, and he said that everything ran smoothly despite his lack of familiarity with the story arcs and characters. The sets for the Vidiian mines were constructed on Paramount Stage 18. Materials used to create security consoles in the Vidiian laboratories were previously used for the construction of Klingon starships. The prosthetics and make-up for the Vidiians were handled by make-up supervisor Michael Westmore. The episode (with the rest of the first season) earned a nomination for the Primetime Emmy Award for Outstanding Individual Achievement in Makeup for a Series for the 47th Primetime Emmy Awards, but lost to Star Trek: Deep Space Nine.

Cast members have commented on their performances in the episode. Robert Beltran, who played Commander Chakotay, said he felt uncomfortable acting in the facial mask worn for his character's Vidiian disguise. He described the prosthetics as "that raw, wounded face, which made me feel very vulnerable as a person", and viewed it as an acting challenge. Garrett Wang, who portrayed Ensign Harry Kim, said that his role in the episode was restricted to technobabble. Robert Picardo, who played the Doctor, appreciated the interactions between Torres and his character as they represented how he was originally "just a functionary doing his job". Picardo added that his scenes showed that it was too soon for his character to understand the importance of his operation on Torres, or to develop any sort of relationship with her.

Various bloopers occurred during the filming of the episode. The first take of a scene in which Chakotay, Tuvok, and Kim encounter two Vidiians was interrupted when Beltran forgot his line and improvised a joke about the aliens' appearance. Kolbe was dissatisfied with several of the following takes and told the actors to "put a little acting into this one, please". During another sequence, Nana Visitor, who played Kira Nerys in Star Trek: Deep Space Nine, walked on set by accident.

=== Separation of B'Elanna Torres ===
The Klingon and human halves of B'Elanna Torres confront one another. The scenes between the two are noted for revealing the long-running plot arc of Torres' conflict about her identity.

Actress Roxann Dawson was initially doubtful about the script, believing that the concept was occurring too early in the series for her to understand the character well enough to play two separate people. She said that she physically shook when reading the script for the first time, and found the episode an acting challenge that broadened her abilities and deepened her connection with the character. Dawson said: "I was able to delineate these two sides that up until then were just metaphors." She reasoned that the episode provided an opportunity "to personify two aspects of this character".

Dawson was given two versions of the script, one labeled "The Klingon" and the other "The Human". The scripts treated the human and Klingon forms of Torres as two separate characters, emphasizing their flaws. Dawson observed that Human Torres lacked strength and courage, while Klingon Torres lacked logic and control. She felt that the Klingon should receive more attention, especially when Torres struggles with that side of her identity throughout the series. She also wanted the episode to capture Klingon Torres' respect for Human Torres. Dawson added that the episode's central theme was "learning to respect the parts of one's self that make up the whole person". "Faces" was noted for establishing Torres' ongoing inability to reconcile her human and Klingon identities, in "the most literal battle". Biller disagreed with the episode's resolution, arguing that Torres should remain human. He felt that the episode should have a longer impact on Torres' character development, and believed: "[w]e couldn't get to the end of the episode and say that Torres has now resolved all her issues and is at peace with herself". This story arc continued in the later episodes "Day of Honor" and "Prophecy", in which Torres eventually accepted her Klingon heritage.

Actress Joy Kilpatrick was cast as Dawson's photo double. Dawson described having a great working relationship with her stand-in. Discussing Kilpatrick, she said, "I was about to tell her what I was going to be doing so she could give me the beats that I could react to properly" and found her to be supportive and intuitive. Kilpatrick was not credited for her performance in the episode. Kolbe noted that the episode used a lot of visual effects, specifically to create the illusion of the two versions of Torres. The casting of a photo double allowed Kolbe to avoid relying on split screen. The scheduling was carefully planned to account for the make-up used for both roles.

Dawson described the prosthetics for the Klingon version of Torres as "a forehead, nose, and teeth". She felt that the look was not as sophisticated as the character's normal appearance as a half-human/half-Klingon because of the lack of skin tones and nuances of the facial features. While Dawson's make-up typically took two hours to apply, the full Klingon prosthetics took around three hours. To save time reapplying the make-up and prosthetics repeatedly, each day's shooting would concentrate on one of the two characters, and switch the following day. Dawson compared the experience to repertory theatre. Despite the casting of the photo double, and attention to scheduling, Kolbe was disappointed in not being able to shoot more scenes with the two versions of Torres in the cave, but understood the frequent use of the split screen could negatively impact the production cost. After the episode had aired, Dawson called her parents to ask their opinions. They replied: "you were good, but the girl that played that Klingon was really great!" Dawson took their remarks as a compliment.

== Broadcast history and release ==
"Faces" was first broadcast on May 8, 1995, on UPN at 8 pm Eastern Standard Time in the United States. The episode received a Nielsen rating of 6.1/10 ratings share; this placed it in 77th place overall for the week. This marked a drop in viewership compared to the previous episode "Cathexis", which had earned a 6.4 rating.

The episode was first released for home media use on VHS in the United Kingdom in 1995 as part of a two-episode collection with "Cathexis". This was followed by a release in the United Kingdom in 1996, which was re-released the following year. It was first released on DVD as part of the first season release on February 24, 2004, in the United States. The episode was also available on numerous streaming video on demand services, such as Amazon Video, iTunes, Hulu, and Netflix.

== Reception ==
=== Cast and crew response ===
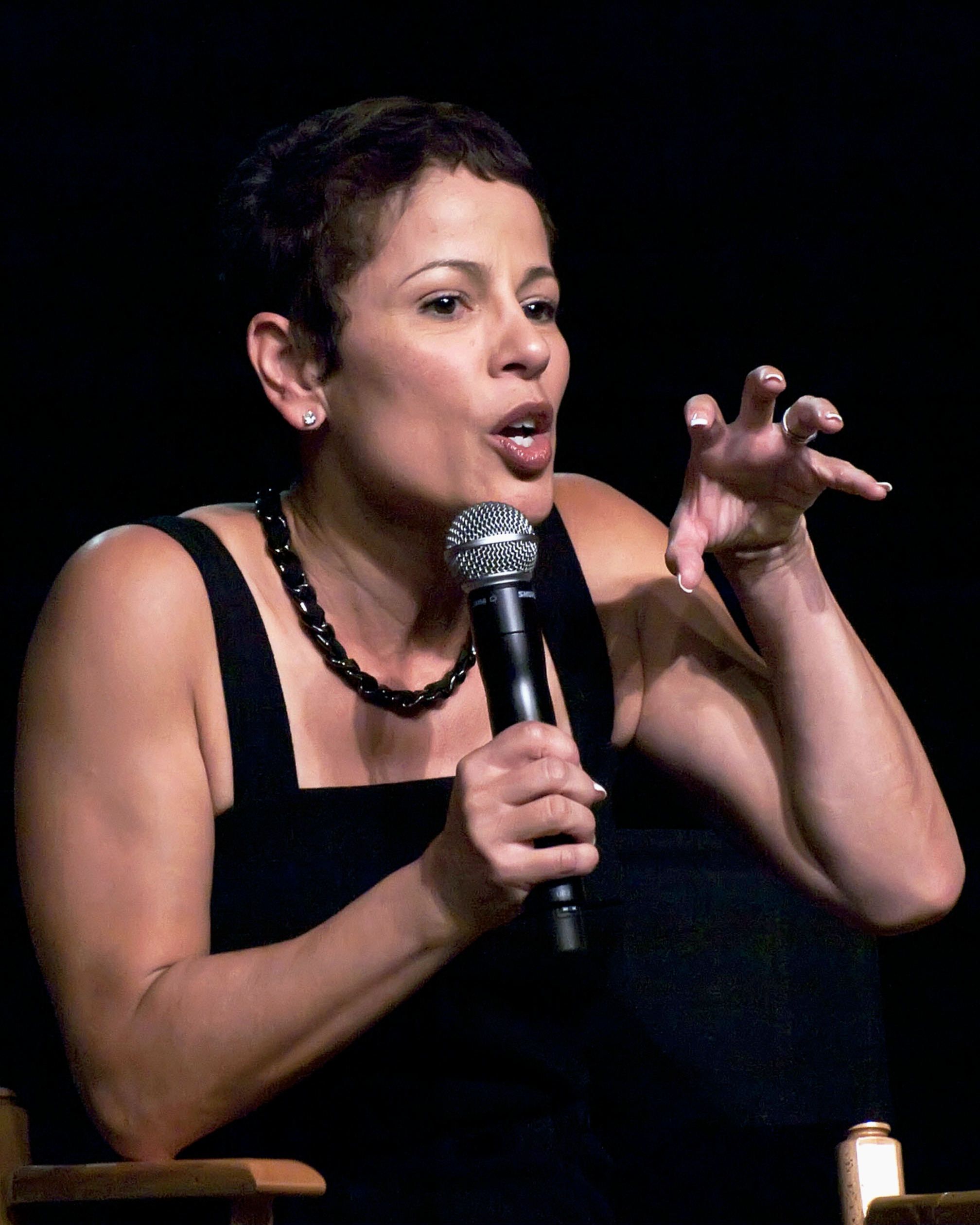
Roxann Dawson's performance in "Faces" was praised by the cast, crew, and television commentators.

The episode was positively received by the cast and crew for its representation of Torres' internal conflict over her half-human, half-Klingon identity. Biller identified the episode as his favorite of the three scripts he wrote for the show's first season; he also wrote "Elogium" and "Jetrel". He viewed the scene depicting Torres' realization that she was human as one of the best from the episode. Dawson described the episode as a "very big step for B'Elanna" and appreciated that the script avoided a cliché ending by leaving room for Torres to deal with her internal identity struggles. Towards the end of Voyager's final season, she looked back on the episode as one of the show's highlights. Taylor and Beltran praised Dawson for her ability to play two contrasting characters; Beltran added that it was a great episode that showcased Dawson's abilities as an actor. While Kolbe initially found Dawson's inquisitiveness and frequent questions during filming to be a challenge, he felt that she did "a hell of a job on that one". He enjoyed the completed version of the episode, but was disappointed with its ending.

The producers and writers also commented on the appearance of the Vidiians in the episode. Piller, Braga, and Taylor praised executive producer Rick Berman's decision to reformat Torres' storyline with the inclusion of the Vidiians. Freelance writer Skye Dent, who had helped with the original development of the Vidiians for "Phage" was impressed by the episode's representation of the alien species, and felt it was an improvement over her concepts. Biller highlighted the scene revealing Sulan's transplant of Durst's face onto his own as "my classic moment in Voyager first season".

=== Critical reception ===
"Faces" received largely positive reviews from critics, including io9's James Whitbrook who in 2020 listed it as one of the seven "must-watch" episodes of Star Trek: Voyager's first season. Dawson's performance and Torres' characterization was praised as the episode's highlights. Den of Geek!'s Juliette Harrisson and Jamahl Epsicokhan of Jammer's Reviews cited it as one of the first season's highlights. Harrisson praised the episode for having "some fine character work from Roxann Dawson" and appreciated how it helped to establish "Voyager's most successful romantic pairing" (Torres and Paris). Epsicokhan appreciated that the episode was not repeating a story from Star Trek: The Next Generation. He praised Dawson's performance, and was disappointed that the character was frequently restricted to technobabble throughout the rest of the series. Will Nguyen of Treknews.net identified the episode as a positive development for Torres that enabled the audience to better understand her character.

Some reviewers were critical of the episode's story. TrekToday's Michelle Erica Green praised "Faces" as an effective character study of Torres and felt it showcased Dawson's abilities as an actor. However, Green criticized the plot an unoriginal take on the evil twin trope and said the science was unbelievable in the context of the show. Tor.com's Keith DeCandido identified "Faces" as the worst episode of the first season. Although he enjoyed Kolbe's direction, DeCandido dismissed the script as being "a hoary premise that nonetheless could have been used for good character development". He praised Dawson's "subdued and anxiety-ridden" performance as the Human Torres, but criticized her tendency to over-enunciate her lines as the Klingon Torres, likely due to her prosthetics.

Critics and fans responded negatively to the episode's final sequence. Taylor described getting adverse fan mail about the lack of sympathy expressed by Voyager's crew members for Torres in the ending. She clarified that Chakotay's response to Torres was intended to be unresponsive rather than cold, and acknowledged that he should have "put his arm around her and show[n] some warmth" as suggested by fans. Green was surprised that Torres was not given a pep talk by either Captain Kathryn Janeway (Kate Mulgrew) or Chakotay in the final scene. DeCandido was critical of Torres' character development in the episode, and disliked how she "doesn't learn anything except that she'd be happier if she wasn't half-Klingon". He wrote that Captain James T. Kirk had a stronger arc in "The Enemy Within", and viewed "Faces" as inferior to that episode. Epsicokhan, on the other hand, found the lack of answers from Chakotay to be an appropriate ending given the focus on Torres' personal conflicts.

=== Racial analysis ===
The character of Torres has been the subject of academic racial analysis. In her article "The Monster Inside: 19th Century Racial Constructs in the 24th Century Mythos of Star Trek", Denise Alessandria Hurd wrote that "Faces" demonstrated that the character of Torres was developed according to the tragic mulatto archetype. Hurd pointed out that Human Torres looked like "a poster child for the cult of white womanhood", while Klingon Torres had more stereotypical African-American features, such as dark skin and kinky hair, although Klingons have always been portrayed with darker skin since their introduction in the original series. Torres' final statement that she will always experience internal conflict was identified as a marker of mental instability by Hurd, who felt such behavior was normalized in hybrid characters. Allen Kwan also cited the episode's final scene as a negative commentary on race in his article "Seeking New Civilizations: Race Normativity in the Star Trek Franchise". He wrote that Torres' desire to be completely human was a "tacit acknowledgement of the racial normativity inherent to Starfleet and the Federation".

Susan De Gaia argued in her article "Intergalactic Heroines: Land, Body and Soul in Star Trek: Voyager" that the separation of Torres into her Klingon and human halves positively addressed diversity. De Gaia felt that the episode communicated that "a strong woman is created by incorporating the human with a stronger race, the Klingon, and by affiliation with an independent group". In her book American Science Fiction TV: Star Trek, Stargate and Beyond, Jan Johnson-Smith categorized "Faces" as one instance in which the Star Trek franchise has tackled "[i]ssues of individual difference" and compared it to the combining of Tuvok and Neelix (Ethan Phillips) in the second-season episode "Tuvix". Elisabeth Anne Leonard also discussed Torres' epiphany about her identity in her book Into Darkness Peering: Race and Color in the Fantastic. Leonard wrote that the ending of "Faces" acts as Torres' "acceptance of a Creole self" as opposed to her "incipient destruction of a Creole identity" such as in the episode "Dreadnought".

In the chapter "Femme Noire" from the book Goddesses and Monsters: Women, Myth, Power, and Popular Culture, Jane Caputi and Lauri Sagle called "Faces" one of the "more thoughtful Virgin/Cannibal narrative structures"—a literary device that they invented and defined as "push[ing] the envelope of the classic virgin/whore paradigm". Caputi and Sagle approached the episode as a "metaphorical tale of mestiza experience and conscious" given Torres' Spanish last name. They connected the character's difficulty with her identity to Gloria E. Anzaldúa's theoretical work, interpreting Torres as crafting a new "inner and outer face" for herself.
