= Susan Diol =

American television actress (born 1962)

- Born: Susan Vanita Diol; May 25, 1962 (age 64); Marquette, Michigan
- Education: Otterbein University (BFA)
- Occupation: Actress
- Years active: 1986–present
- Spouses: Jerry Rapp (m. 1991; div. 1993) Shaun Cassidy (m. 1995; div. 2003) Andy Cadiff (m. 2003; div. 2010) William Newkirk (m. 2014; div. 2016)
- Children: 1

Susan Vanita Diol (born May 25, 1962) is an American actress who has played supporting roles in over forty television series, including Quantum Leap (1989–1993; 2022–2024), One Life to Live, Wings, Star Trek: The Next Generation, Star Trek: Voyager, NCIS, and CSI: Crime Scene Investigation.

== Career ==
=== 1986–1999 ===
Diol acted in children's theatre productions in Illinois before beginning her on-screen career. She appeared in episodes of sitcoms, including: two 1990 episodes of Night Court, playing Dan Fielding's (John Larroquette) sister Donna; the Seinfeld 1991 episode "The Nose Job", as Audrey (the one who had the nose job); and a 1995 episode of Wings, playing a call girl whom Joe and Brian inadvertently choose as a rebound date for lovelorn Antonio. Diol has appeared in episodes of science fiction television series, including: portraying Carmen Davila in the Star Trek: The Next Generation episode "Silicon Avatar"; the role of Doctor Danara Pel in the Star Trek: Voyager episodes "Lifesigns" and "Resolutions"; the role of Beth Calavicci, first wife of Al Calavicci, in two episodes of Quantum Leap (including the finale to the original run of the series). Diol was in the made-for-TV movies Popeye Doyle (1986) as The Blonde, A Perry Mason Mystery: The Case of the Jealous Jokester (1995) as Ivy West, and Alien Nation: Millennium (1996) as Marina Del Ray. She was the replacement for Amanda Plummer in the Broadway play You Never Can Tell from October 9, 1986, to January 25, 1987, as Dolly Clandon.

=== 2000–present ===
Diol took over the role of Alexis Davis on General Hospital temporarily from November 2001 to March 2002 for Nancy Lee Grahn. She played Gabby in the French film Reality (2014) and Cindy in Loqueesha (2019). Diol reprised the role of Beth in five episodes (over both seasons) of the Quantum Leap revival. She returned to General Hospital in June 2023 as Nurse Clara.

== Personal life ==
Diol was born in Marquette, Michigan, and raised in Palatine, Illinois, and Worthington, Ohio. She graduated from Otterbein College in Westerville, Ohio, with a Bachelor of Fine Arts. Diol has married four times: to Jerry Rapp (1991–1993), Shaun Cassidy (1995–2003), Andy Cadiff (2003–2010), and William Newkirk (2014–2016).

== Theatre ==
Start date	End date	Title	Role	Venue	Notes
October 9, 1986	January 25, 1987	You Never Can Tell	Dolly Clandon	Circle in the Square Theatre	125 performances

== Filmography ==
=== Film ===
Year	Title	Role	Notes
2013	Wedding Bell Booze	Emma	Short film written and directed by Julie Bersani
2014	Reality	Gaby	Surreal comedy-drama film written and directed by Quentin Dupieux (French: Réalité)
2019	Loqueesha	Cindy	Comedy film written, directed, and produced by Jeremy Saville
2025	Rhythm Is a Dancer	Drunk Donna	Comedy-drama film written and directed by Lauren Caster

=== Television ===
Year	Title	Role	Notes
1986	Popeye Doyle	The Blonde	Made-for-TV movie directed by Peter Levin; Also known as The French Connection 3
1987–88	The Cosby Show	Cheryl	Episodes: "The Shower"; "Home for the Weekend"
1988	Hothouse	Claudia Garrison	Main role
1989	The Road Raiders	Lt. Johanson	Made-for-TV movie directed by Richard Lang
1989	Growing Pains	Miss Sanders	Episode: "Carol Meets the Real World"
1989–90	FM	Lisa	Episodes: "Ultimate Aphrodisiac"; "No Fool Like an April Fool"
1990	Baywatch	Kate Jarvis	Episode: "Old Friends"
1990	Night Court	Donna	Episodes: "A Family Affair, part 1"; "A Family Affair, part 2"
1990	Going Places	Donna	Episode: "Married to the Mob"
1990–93	Quantum Leap	Beth Calavicci	Episodes: "M.I.A. – April 1, 1969"; "Mirror Image – August 8, 1953"
1990–91	Days of Our Lives	Emmy Borden	Recurring role
1991	Paradise	Lisa	Episode: "The Valley of the Death"
1991	Star Trek: The Next Generation	Carmen Davila	Episode: "Silicon Avatar"
1991	Seinfeld	Audrey	Episode: "The Nose Job"
1992	P.S.I. Luv U	Valerie Vincenzo	Episode: "A Bundle of Trouble"
1992	Seduction: Three Tales from the 'Inner Sanctum	Ada Raymond	Made-for-TV movie directed by Michael Ray Rhodes
1992	Civil Wars	Margaret Stuart	Episode: "Oboe Phobia"
1992	Great Scott!	Miss Nicastro	Episodes: "Choir Mire"; "Stone Moan"
1992	Herman's Head	Hypnotist	Episode: "Feardom of Speech"
1993–94	One Life to Live	Angela Holliday	Recurring role
1993	Reasonable Doubts	Mrs. Roberts	Episode: "The Iceman"
1993	Murphy Brown	Michelle	Episode: "To Market, To Market"
1994	One West Waikiki	Miriam	Episode: "'Til Death Do Us Part"
1994	Party of Five	Rebecca Shay	Episode: "All's Fair"
1994–95	Christy	Margaret Henderson MacNeill	Episodes: "Amazing Grace"; "The Road Home"
1995	Walker, Texas Ranger	Diane Reno	Episode: "War Zone"
1995	A Perry Mason Mystery: The Case of the Jealous Jokester	Ivy West	Made-for-TV movie directed by Vincent McEveety
1995	Her Deadly Rival	Jean	Made-for-TV movie directed by James Hayman
1995	Wings	Heather	Episode: "Hooker, Line, and Sinker"
1995	The Client	Helen Nichols	Episode: "The Prodigal Father"
1996	Alien Nation: Millennium	Marina Del Rey	Made-for-TV movie written and directed by Kenneth Johnson
1996	Touched by an Angel	Susan Duplain	Episode: "The One That Got Away"
1996	Star Trek: Voyager	Dr. Danara Pel	Episodes: "Lifesigns"; "Resolutions"
1996	Nick Freno: Licensed Teacher	Mrs. Hale	Episode: "Me and Mrs. Hale"
1997	Diagnosis Murder	Jeri Murdico	Episodes: "Murder Two, part 1"; "Murder Two, part 2"
1997	Pensacola: Wings of Gold	Sheila Redding	Episode: "Freebird"
2000	Cover Me: Based on the True Life of an FBI Family	Brittany Evans	Episode: "Where Have You Gone, Sandy Koufax?"
2000	Yes, Dear	Andrea	Episode: "Weaning Isn't Everything"
2001	The Fugitive	Jamie Lund	Episode: "Tucker's Gift"
2001–02; 2023	General Hospital	Alexis Davis; Nurse Clara	Recurring (Temporarily November 2001 to March 2002 for Nancy Lee Grahn); 2 episodes
2002	Philly	Mindy Barnes/Elise Redman	Episode: "Tall Tales"
2002	The Agency	Debra	Episodes: "The Plague Year"; "Finale"
2002	The Ellen Show	Joanne	Episode: "Shallow Gal"
2003	Touch 'Em All McCall	Samantha	Made-for-TV movie directed by Norman Steinberg
2003–11	CSI: Crime Scene Investigation	Beth Dunbar; Janet Hughes	Episodes: "Grissom Versus the Volcano"; "Bittersweet"
2005	Eyes	Jennifer Harper	Episode: "Whereabouts"
2006	Without a Trace	Carol Whitney	Episode: "More Than This"
2006	Desperate Housewives	Flight Attendant	Episode: "No One Is Alone"
2006; 2023	NCIS	Dr. Leslie Burke; Doris Sawyer	Episodes: "Witch Hunt"; "Big Rig"
2009	Cold Case	Kristi Duren	Episode: "Dead Heat"
2013–14	Hart of Dixie	Carolee O'Connell	Episodes: "I Ran to You"; "Something to Talk About"
2014–15	Murder in the First	Denison	Episodes: "Burning Woman"; "Blue on Blue"
2015	Perception	Mrs. Gardner	Episode: "Romeo"
2016	Notorious	Rita Rollins	Episode: "The Perp Walk"
2016	Bad Twin	Attorney	Made-for-TV movie directed by John Murlowski
2017	The Wrong Mother	Dr. Bartelini	Made-for-TV movie directed by Craig Goldsmith; Also known as Deadly Devotion
2017	Hacker	Motel Attendant	Made-for-TV movie directed by Nadeem Soumah
2017	Your Own Road	Sophie	Made-for-TV movie directed by Brandon Buczek
2022–24	Quantum Leap	Beth Calavicci	5 episodes
