= Deadlock (Star Trek: Voyager) =

- Star Trek: Voyager episode
- Episode no.: Season 2 Episode 21
- Directed by: David Livingston
- Written by: Brannon Braga
- Production code: 137
- Original air date: March 18, 1996

Guest appearances
- Nancy Hower - Ensign Samantha Wildman; Simon Billig - Hogan; Bob Clendenin - Vidiian Surgeon; Ray Proscia - Vidiian Commander

Episode chronology
← Previous "Investigations"	Next → "Innocence"
- Star Trek: Voyager season 2

"Deadlock" is the 37th episode of Star Trek: Voyager, the 21st episode of the second season. The episode aired on UPN on March 18, 1996.

Set in the late 24th century, the series follows the crew of the starship USS Voyager, after the ship was displaced to the Delta Quadrant, far from the rest of the Federation. In this episode Voyager is split into two versions of itself sharing the same power source, while being attacked by a species of organ harvesting aliens known as the Vidiian.

== Plot ==
Voyager hits subspace turbulence and suffers from power failures after passing through a plasma drift to avoid Vidiian territory. As B'Elanna Torres prepares a series of proton bursts to keep the antimatter reaction in the warp engines alive, Voyager is bombarded with proton bursts from an unknown source. The bursts cause shipwide hull ruptures and casualties, including the deaths of Harry Kim and the newborn Naomi Wildman, while Kes disappears through a space-time rift. As the crew recovers, Torres discovers there is air on the other side of the rift, and believes that it may be possible to rescue Kes. The bridge crew is forced to evacuate the bridge when it is engulfed in flames, but as she leaves, Captain Kathryn Janeway sees a ghostly image of the bridge-crew, calmly at their stations.

The viewer is then shown the immaculate bridge of Voyager, where that version of Janeway watches a ghostly image of herself evacuate the bridge. This Voyager's proton bursts succeeded in maintaining the reaction, but damaged its doppelganger, of which the crew are aware due to Kes's arrival through the rift. The respective crews are able to make contact with each other, and conclude that upon exiting the nebula, Voyager and its crew were duplicated as a result of a space-time rift. However, this did not replicate the antimatter, hence the power failures.

The two crews attempt to merge the ships, but the effort is unsuccessful. Janeway from the undamaged Voyager crosses through the rift along with the duplicate of Kes. The two Janeways meet to discuss options, recognizing they cannot evacuate the damaged Voyager without creating a quantum imbalance. Janeway from the damaged Voyager states she will initiate a self-destruct of her ship to allow the undamaged one to regain power. Janeway from the undamaged ship asks her counterpart to delay for 15 minutes to devise another option, and returns to her ship via the rift.

The undamaged Voyager is attacked by Vidiian ships; Vidiians soon appear on board and begin harvesting vital organs from the crew. The damaged Voyager, however, is undetected by the Vidiians. Janeway from the undamaged ship orders her Harry Kim to collect baby Naomi Wildman and escape through the rift to the damaged Voyager, and then begins a self-destruct of her Voyager. The explosion destroys the ship and the attacking Vidiians, leaving the damaged Voyager free and returning to normal power-reserves.

== Production ==
Writer Brannon Braga was initially inspired to create an episode with a strange narrative structure, and the team felt like they needed a more action heavy episode. A similar episode was proposed, unsuccessfully, for Star Trek: The Next Generation, and executive producer Jeri Taylor noted that difficulties that the writers encountered on that episode informed the structure of Deadlock. They decided to focus the story on the two Captain Janeways and their interactions, resulting in what actress Kate Mulgrew described as "the most arduous and possibly the most satisfying work I've ever done, technically".

The episode initially ran short, leaving the crew to write extra material, shot over two extra days.

== Reception ==
"Deadlock" had a rating of 9/10 on TV.com, the highest of season 2 of Voyager. It had Nielsen ratings of 5.8 points when it debuted in 1996 on UPN television. It was later voted the favourite episode of the second season during a fan poll. Similarly Star Trek Monthly ranked the episode with 4/5 stars, and Cinefantastique 3/4.

In 2015, a Star Trek: Voyager binge-watching guide by W.I.R.E.D. suggested this episode should not be skipped.

Den of Geek considers it one of the most brutal Voyager episodes and included it in their Voyager viewing guide in 2017.

The Hollywood Reporter listed it in their top 15 episodes of Star Trek: Voyager. In 2015, SyFy rated it among the top ten of Voyager episodes.

In 2016, Vox rated this one of the top 25 essential episodes of all Star Trek.

In 2020, this episode was ranked the 8th best episode of Voyager by SyFy.

In 2020, io9 ranked this as one of the "must watch" episodes in season 2 of Voyager.

== See also ==
- Quantum eraser experiment
