= Kenneth Biller =

American television director, producer and writer

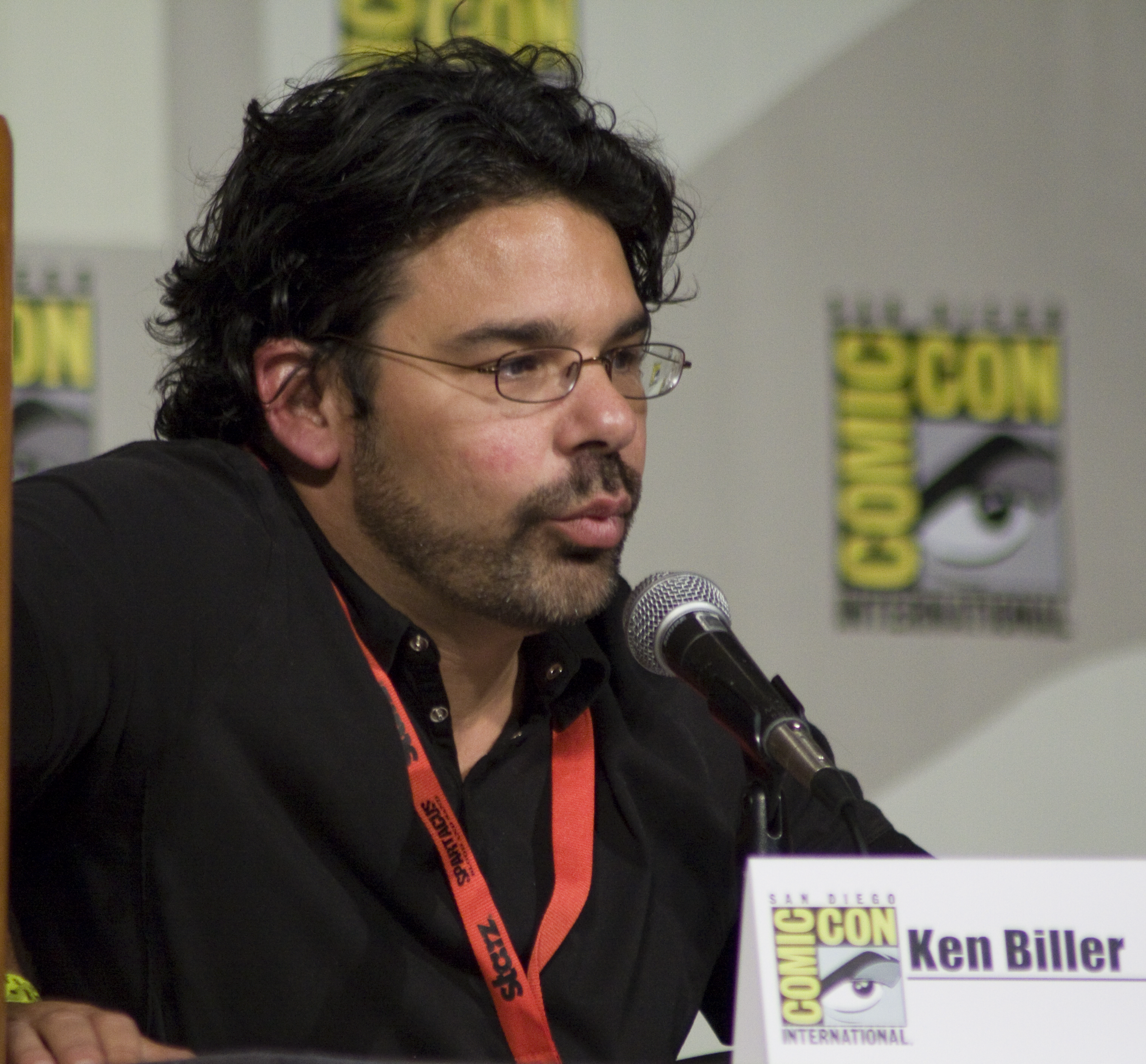
- Kenneth Biller at the Legend of the Seeker panel at San Diego Comic-Con in 2009
- Born: December 23, 1964 (age 61)
- Occupations: Television producer, writer, director
- Years active: 1992 – present
- Children: 2

Kenneth Todd Biller (born December 23, 1964) is a television producer, writer, director and editor. He has worked on a number of American television shows including Beverly Hills, 90210, Star Trek: Voyager, Legend of the Seeker and Perception. During his time on Voyager, he rose from executive story editor during the first season up to executive producer in the final season, and was responsible for writing the episode which introduced the Borg into the show.

== Early life ==
Biller attended Brown University in Providence, Rhode Island.

== Career ==
Biller's television career began in 1992 when he joined the crew of Beverly Hills, 90210 as an executive story editor. He also wrote for The X Files in 1993.

In 1995, Biller joined the team at Star Trek: Voyager as an executive story editor. A year later, he became co-producer of the show and made producer a year after that. During the sixth season of the show he became co-executive producer, and was again promoted, this time to executive producer and showrunner for Voyager's seventh and final season. He received writing credits on several episodes of the show, and directed a number of episodes including "Revulsion" and "One". Biller wrote the episode "Unity" which featured the first appearance of the alien species the Borg in Voyager, who had previously appeared in Star Trek: The Next Generation, Deep Space Nine and the movie Star Trek: First Contact.

In 2008, he was linked with a series based on the Terry Goodkind fantasy novel series Wizard's First Rule. This became the series Legend of the Seeker, which was created by ABC Studios for broadcast syndication. Biller worked as one of several executive producers, including Sam Raimi. Biller has recently been writing for the TNT crime drama series Perception, including co-writing the pilot episode alongside fellow former Voyager writer Mike Sussman. Biller and Sussman collaborated on the creation of the series.

== Personal life ==
Biller is married, has a daughter and son, and lives in Los Angeles, California.

== Filmography ==
List of production credits
| Year | Title | Notes |
|---|---|---|
| 1992 | Beverly Hills, 90210 | Writer (3 episodes), executive story editor (13 episodes) |
| 1993 | The X Files | Writer "Eve" |
| 1995 | Hawkeye | Writer "Fly with Me" |
| 1995-2001 | Star Trek: Voyager | Writer (35 episodes), executive story editor (31 episodes), director (2 episodes), co-producer (36 episodes), producer (27 episodes), co-executive producer (26 episodes), supervising producer (26 episodes), executive producer (25 episodes) |
| 1999 | The Last Man on Planet Earth (TV movie) | Writer, executive producer |
| 2002 | Dark Angel | Director (2 episodes) |
| 2002-2004 | Smallville | Writer (5 episodes), director (4 episodes), co-executive producer (44 episodes) |
| 2004 | North Shore | Writer (2 episodes), director (2 episodes), co-executive producer (20 episodes) |
| 2005-2006 | E-Ring | Writer (3 episodes), director "Acceptable Losses", co-executive producer (23 episodes) |
| 2006-2007 | Six Degrees | Writer "Surstromming or a Slice", executive producer (12 episodes) |
| 2008-2010 | Legend of the Seeker | Writer (26 episodes), executive producer (44 episodes) |
| 2012-2015 | Perception | Writer (10 episodes), director (2 episodes), executive producer (6 episodes) |
| 2017 | Genius | Writer (10 episodes), executive producer (10 episodes) |
| 2022 | The Cleaning Lady | Director (1 episode) |
| 2024 | Land of Women | Director (2 episodes) |

== See also ==
- List of Star Trek production staff
