= Simon Billig =

British actor

Simon Billig (born in Birmingham, England) is an English actor based out of both New York and Los Angeles.

Billig started in American television on Star Trek: Voyager as Ensign Hogan in the second and third seasons. He also had a recurring role in Babylon 5 and multiple appearances on Silk Stalkings. Other television credits include a long list of guest starring roles including, most recently, an episode of Third Watch. In 2004, he had a recurring role on ABC's One Life to Live as Gerhardt.

== Appearances ==
=== Television ===
- A Family in Crisis: The Elian Gonzales Story (2000) (TV) .... Agent Parker
- Seven Days (episode "Last Card Up" {1999}) .... Joseph
- Dark Skies (episode "Strangers in the Night" {1997}) .... Dr. Carl Sagan
- Life's Work (episode "Contempt" {1996}) .... Trooper Jackson
- Star Trek: Voyager .... Ensign Hogan (7 episodes in 1996)

=== Film ===
- Dean Quixote (2000) .... Guy Fox
- Bad City Blues (1999) .... Artie
- The Thin Red Line (1998) .... Lt. Col. Billig

=== Theatre ===
- Plays Bill in "Lobby Hero" (February 2002, South Coast Repertory theatre, Costa Mesa, California)
