= Experienced (album) =

Live album by Boom Boom Satellites
- Released: February 23, 2011
- Recorded: October 2, 2010
- Genre: Electronic, rock
- Length: 76:15 (CD)
- Label: gr8! Records (Sony Music Records)

Boom Boom Satellites chronology
Over and Over (2010)	Experienced (2011)	Remixed (2012)

Experienced is a live CD and DVD set by Japanese electronica/rock duo Boom Boom Satellites. Released on February 23, 2011, the album consists of a recording of their performance at Chiba's Makuhari Messe, the last stop of their Japan Tour 2010 2nd Stage. The set list mainly features tracks from their 2010 studio album To the Loveless. Mastering of the album was completed on January 6, 2011, as announced by the band's Twitter account.

== Track listing ==
All music is composed by Boom Boom Satellites

CD
No.	Title	Length
1.	"Back On My Feet" (from To the Loveless)	8:36
2.	"Morning After" (from Exposed)	6:45
3.	"Drain" (from To the Loveless)	6:07
4.	"Undertaker" (from To the Loveless)	6:09
5.	"To the Loveless" (from To the Loveless)	2:40
6.	"Stay" (from To the Loveless)	8:20
7.	"Fogbound" (from Umbra)	11:46
8.	"Rise and Fall" (from Full of Elevating Pleasures)	7:15
9.	"Kick It Out" (from On)	7:37
10.	"Dig the New Breed" (Never before released on CD)	11:00
Total length:		76:15

DVD
No.	Title	Length
1.	"Back On My Feet" (from To the Loveless)
2.	"Morning After" (from Exposed)
3.	"Drain" (from To the Loveless)
4.	"Undertaker" (from To the Loveless)
5.	"To the Loveless" (from To the Loveless)
6.	"Stay" (from To the Loveless)
7.	"Fogbound" (from Umbra)
8.	"Rise and Fall" (from Full of Elevating Pleasures)
9.	"Kick It Out" (from On)
10.	"Lock Me Out" (from To the Loveless)
11.	"Dive For You" (from Full of Elevating Pleasures)
12.	"Dress LIke An Angel" (from Photon)
