= Over and Over (Boom Boom Satellites album) =

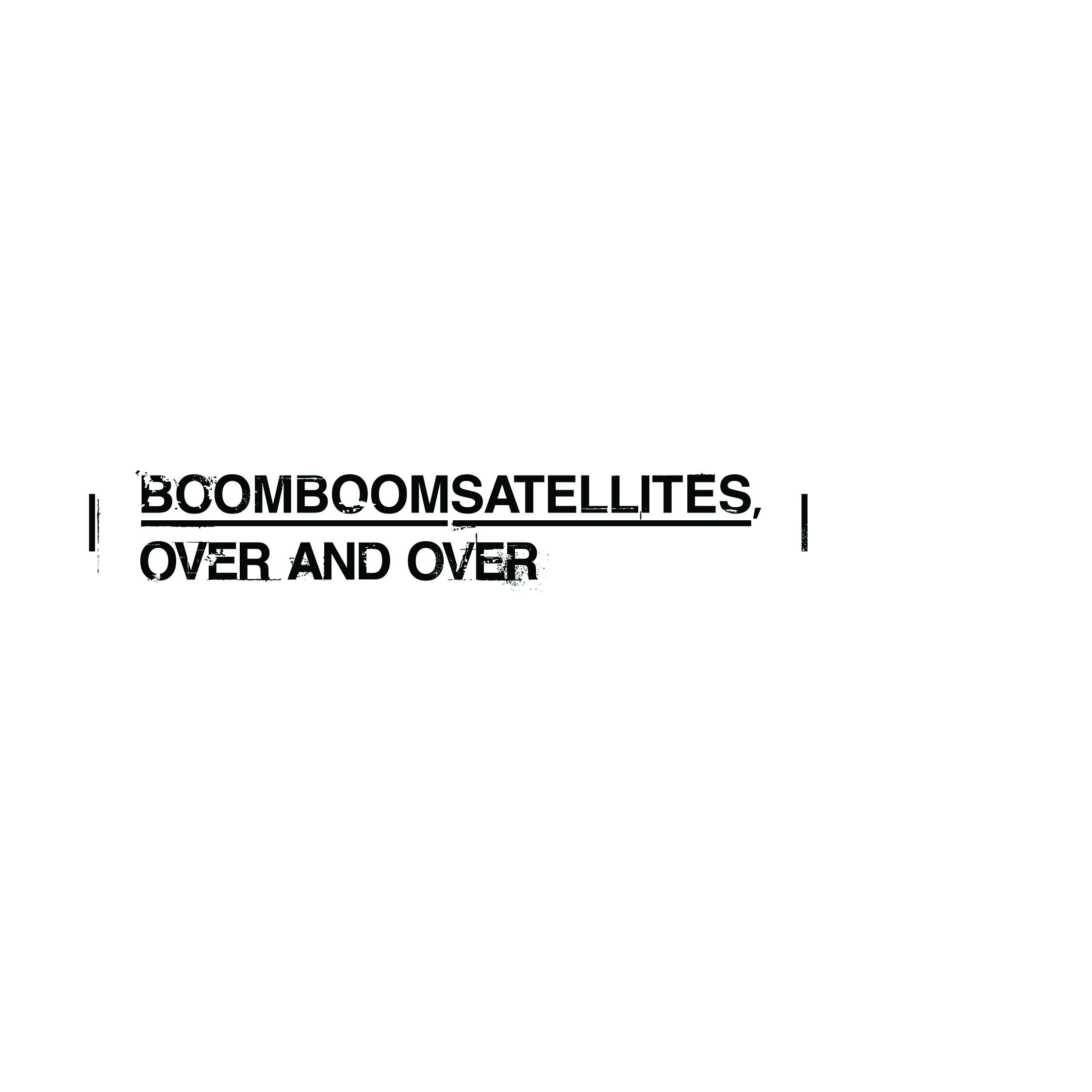

Compilation album by Boom Boom Satellites
- Released: September 14, 2010 (Digital); October 19, 2010 (CD)
- Genre: Electronica, rock
- Label: Sony

Boom Boom Satellites chronology
To the Loveless (2010)	Over and Over (2010)	Experienced (2011)

Over and Over is a greatest hits album by Japanese electronica/rock band Boom Boom Satellites. The album is itself a shorter version of their previous compilation 19972007, but exclusively released to the United States rather than to Japan, to coincide with their American tour, which includes a stop at New York Comic Con. The album was initially released digitally to the iTunes Store on September 14, 2010, and then physically on CD on October 19, 2010.

== Track listing ==
All tracks are written by Boom Boom Satellites

No.	Title	Length
1.	"Kick It Out" (On)
2.	"What Goes Around Comes Around" (Exposed)
3.	"Looking Glass" (Umbra)
4.	"Pill (Album Version)" (On)
5.	"Morning After" (Exposed)
6.	"Light My Fire (Album Version)" (Photon)
7.	"Let It All Come Down (Album Version)" (Full of Elevating Pleasures)
8.	"40-Forty-" (Photon)
9.	"GIRL (Album Version)" (On)
10.	"Moment I Count" (Full of Elevating Pleasures)
11.	"On The Painted Desert (Album Version)" (Out Loud)
12.	"Intergalactic" (Exposed)
13.	"Soliloquy" (Umbra)
14.	"Panacea" (Umbra)
15.	"Stride (Album Version)" (Full of Elevating Pleasures)
16.	"Easy Action" (Exposed)
17.	"Shut Up And Explode" (Exposed)
