= 19972007 =

Compilation album by Boom Boom Satellites
- Released: January 27, 2010
- Genres: Electronica, rock
- Length: 67:48 (Disc 1); 69:59 (Disc 2)
- Label: Sony Japan

Boom Boom Satellites chronology
Exposed (2007)	19972007 (2010)	To the Loveless (2010)

19972007 is the first greatest hits album from Japanese electronica/rock duo Boom Boom Satellites released on January 27, 2010. The two-disc album compiles the first 10 years of their music with tracks released between 1997 and 2007. A limited edition DVD version was also released containing recordings of live performances and music videos. An alternate best of was released for the American market titled Over and Over to coincide with a series of tourdates in the United States. It is a single-disc retooling of 19972007 with a truncated track list.

19972007 ultimately reached number 8 on the Oricon's Weekly Album Charts.

== Track list ==
All tracks are written by Boom Boom Satellites.

Disc 1
No.	Title	Length
1.	"Kick It Out" (On)	4:38
2.	"What Goes Round Comes Around" (Exposed)	4:20
3.	"Looking Glass" (Umbra)	1:01
4.	"Pill" (On)	3:45
5.	"Morning After" (Exposed)	3:06
6.	"Light My Fire" (Photon)	4:52
7.	"Let it All Come Down" (Full Of Elevating Pleasures)	4:42
8.	"40-Forty-" (Photon)	5:59
9.	"Girl" (On)	4:35
10.	"Moment I Count" (Full Of Elevating Pleasures)	5:03
11.	"On The Painted Desert" (Out Loud)	8:29
12.	"Intergalactic" (Exposed)	4:49
13.	"Soliloquy" (Umbra)	5:37
14.	"PANACEA" (Umbra)	1:28
15.	"Stride" (Full Of Elevating Pleasures)	5:15
Total length:		67:48

Disc 2
No.	Title	Length
16.	"Easy action" (Exposed)	4:29
17.	"Shut Up And Explode" (Exposed)	3:37
18.	"id" (On)	1:30
19.	"Push Eject" (Out Loud)	5:29
20.	"Joyride" (Joyride)	5:06
21.	"Your Realitys' A Fantasy But Your Fantasy Is Killing Me (featuring CHUCK D)" (Umbra)	5:46
22.	"Brandnew Battering RaM" (Umbra)	5:48
23.	"Dress Like An AnGEL" (Photon)	6:06
24.	"Scatterin' Monkey" (Out Loud)	5:17
25.	"Rise and Fall" (Full Of Elevating Pleasures)	4:35
26.	"Dive For You" (Full Of Elevating Pleasures)	4:11
27.	"Propeller" (Full Of Elevating Pleasures)	2:02
28.	"Anthem -reprise-" (Full Of Elevating Pleasures)	5:16
29.	"Ingrained" (Umbra)	6:42
30.	"Echo Tail" (Full Of Elevating Pleasures)	4:05
Total length:		69:59

Limited edition DVD
No.	Title	Length
1.	"Light My Fire" (Fuji Rock Festival 05 Live Cuts)
2.	"Rise&Fall" (Japan tour 06)
3.	"Morning After" (SSTV Sweet Love Shower 08)
4.	"Dig The New Breed" (metamorphose 08)
5.	"Dive For You" (Japan tour 08)
6.	"Kick It Out" (Summer Sonic 09)
7.	"Kick It Out" (music video)
8.	"What Goes Round Comes Around" (music video)
9.	"Pill" (music video)
10.	"Girl" (music video)
11.	"Moment I Count" (music video)
12.	"Intergalactic" (music video)
13.	"Easy Action" (music video)
14.	"Dive For You" (music video)
15.	"Push Eject" (music video)
