= Remixed (Boom Boom Satellites album) =

Remix album by Boom Boom Satellites
- Released: November 7, 2012
- Genres: Electronic, rock
- Length: 139:47
- Label: gr8! Records (Sony Music Records)

Boom Boom Satellites chronology
Experienced (2011)	Remixed (2012)	Embrace (2013)

Remixed is the first remix album by Japanese electronica/rock duo Boom Boom Satellites. Initially scheduled for release on September 19, 2012, it contains remixes of songs from their 15-year-long career, including the American exclusive track "Kick It Out" featuring Tahj Mowry and Flo Rida and the winning fan remix of their most recent single "Broken Mirror".

The release of Remixed was postponed by the band due to issues concerning the album artwork, as announced on their Facebook page. Amazon MP3 listings place the new release date at November 28, 2012. The album's artwork was later changed, announced on October 5, 2012, and the new release date for the album set at November 7, 2012.

== Track listing ==
All tracks are written by Boom Boom Satellites.

Disc 1
No.	Title	Length
1.	"Broken Mirror" (Calla Soiled remix)	5:47
2.	"Broken Mirror" (THE LOWBROWS remix)	5:20
3.	"Broken Mirror" (spcl remix)	6:23
4.	"Back on My Feet" (I'm Back version ALTZ)	6:37
5.	"Easy Action" (Coburn's Sleazy Action Remix)	6:34
6.	"Easy Action" (London Elektricity Remix)	5:30
7.	"Kick It Out" (feat. Tahj Mowry & Flo Rida)	3:08
8.	"Blink" (DJ Tasaka remix)	5:52
9.	"Blink" (Koji Nakamura (Supercar) PX Remix)	4:24
10.	"Sloughin' Blue" (PARADOX Virtual Drummer remix)	6:59
11.	"Sloughin' Blue" (JAMSCAPE)	4:15
12.	"Your Reality's a Fantasy but Your Fantasy Is Killing Me Featuring Chuck D" (Coldcut v. Steinski Going Under Mix)	6:36
Total length:		67:25

Disc 2
No.	Title	Length
13.	"Soliloquy" (Dazzle-T's Headroc RMX)	7:59
14.	"Fogbound" (Klute's London Fog Remix)	6:35
15.	"On the Painted Desert" (Sandwicked Version) (Reconstructed by Kan Takagi)	6:30
16.	"On the Painted Desert" (Tanzmuzik Remix)	7:39
17.	"On the Painted Desert" (DJ Krush Remix)	4:42
18.	"Push Eject" (Howie B. Remix)	6:32
19.	"4 A Moment of Silence" (Trapezoid Mix) (Jack Dangers for Meat Beat Manifesto)	6:30
20.	"Dub Me Crazy Ver.2" (Optical Remix)	7:24
21.	"Dub Me Crazy Ver.2" (Depth Charge Remix)	5:45
22.	"Joyride" (Luke Slater's Basil Brush Boom Mix)	6:44
23.	"Joyride Remix ～ Progression → Final Operation" (BBS Remix)	6:02
Total length:		72:22
