= Experienced II: Embrace Tour 2013 Budokan =

Live album by Boom Boom Satellites
- Released: November 6, 2013
- Recorded: May 3, 2013
- Genre: Electronica, rock
- Length: 77:44 (Physical version); 2:03:58 (Digital version)
- Language: English
- Label: Sony Japan, JPU Records

Boom Boom Satellites chronology
Embrace (2013)	Experienced II: Embrace Tour 2013 Budokan (2013)	Shine Like a Billion Suns (2015)

Experienced II: Embrace Tour 2013 Budokan (EXPERIENCEDII－EMBRACE TOUR 2013 武道館－, EXPERIENCED II -EMBRACE TOUR 2013 Budōkan-) is the second live album by Japanese electronica/rock duo Boom Boom Satellites. Released on November 6, 2013, the album and video pack consists of a recording of the last stop of their partially cancelled tour to promote their most recent album Embrace.

== Background ==
In late 2012, Boom Boom Satellites prepared to begin a tour to promote their 15th anniversary together as well as their album Embrace. However, in December of that year the band revealed that vocalist and guitarist Michiyuki Kawashima had the early stages of a brain tumor and had to prepare for surgery. Bassist and programmer Masayuki Nakano revealed that his bandmate had a history of brain tumors, with their writing and recording sessions often interrupted by Kawashima's health issues, but this was the first time that they ever had to cancel concerts. They ultimately decided to play the last few shows of 2012 and cancel much of their planned national tour in 2013, although they left the possibility of several shows in April and May 2013 as possible. Their concert on May 3, 2013, was planned to be their first ever solo concert at the famous Nippon Budokan. In February 2013, Nakano revealed Kawashima had been released from the hospital and they were writing songs, again. In a later statement, the band revealed that they were cancelling all but their Budokan concert.

The concert was streamed live online via Ustream with 360-degree viewing angles; this was later expanded to YouTube as part of YouTube Japan's Music Week as well as on Nico Nico Douga's live feature. Following the concert, their performance of "Nine" was available on their website with the 360 degree view. The concert was later shown on Fuji TV Next on June 21, 2013.

On August 28, 2013, the band announced that they would be releasing the concert on an album due November 6, 2013, with a DVD or Blu-ray containing the live performances as well. The CD features 10 of the live performances, while the DVD or Blu-ray released with it features the concert's full 16 song set list. The Blu-ray edition also comes with a 128-page booklet detailing the concert. The digital edition of the album, called the "Complete Edition", released to the iTunes Store, Amazon MP3, and mora, features audio versions of the full concert.

== Track listing ==
Disc 1: CD
No.	Title	Length
1.	"Another Perfect Day" (Embrace Tour 2013)	7:49
2.	"Helter Skelter" (Embrace Tour 2013)	3:26
3.	"Broken Mirror" (Embrace Tour 2013)	6:58
4.	"Back On My Feet" (Embrace Tour 2013)	7:53
5.	"Snow" (Embrace Tour 2013)	8:46
6.	"Embrace" (Embrace Tour 2013)	6:53
7.	"Fogbound" (Embrace Tour 2013)	12:05
8.	"Kick It Out" (Embrace Tour 2013)	7:00
9.	"Nine" (Embrace Tour 2013)	6:36
10.	"Stay" (Embrace Tour 2013)	10:14
Total length:		77:44

Disc 2: DVD version
No.	Title	Length
1.	"Another Perfect Day"
2.	"Helter Skelter"
3.	"Broken Mirror"
4.	"Disconnected"
5.	"Morning After"
6.	"Back On My Feet"
7.	"Snow"
8.	"Embrace"
9.	"Fogbound"
10.	"Moment I Count"
11.	"Easy Action"
12.	"Kick It Out"
13.	"Nine"
14.	"Dig the New Breed"
15.	"Dress Like an Angel"
16.	"Stay"

Disc 2: Blu-ray version bonus track
No.	Title	Length
17.	"Nine" (Multi Screen Documentary)

Digital Complete Edition
No.	Title	Length
1.	"Another Perfect Day" (Embrace Tour 2013)	7:49
2.	"Helter Skelter" (Embrace Tour 2013)	3:26
3.	"Broken Mirror" (Embrace Tour 2013)	6:58
4.	"Disconnected" (Embrace Tour 2013)	4:51
5.	"Morning After" (Embrace Tour 2013)	6:07
6.	"Back On My Feet" (Embrace Tour 2013)	7:53
7.	"Snow" (Embrace Tour 2013)	8:46
8.	"Embrace" (Embrace Tour 2013)	6:53
9.	"Fogbound" (Embrace Tour 2013)	12:05
10.	"Moment I Count" (Embrace Tour 2013)	8:22
11.	"Easy Action" (Embrace Tour 2013)	6:55
12.	"Kick It Out" (Embrace Tour 2013)	7:00
13.	"Nine" (Embrace Tour 2013)	6:36
14.	"Dig the New Breed" (Embrace Tour 2013)	10:08
15.	"Dress Like an Angel" (Embrace Tour 2013)	8:06
16.	"Stay" (Embrace Tour 2013)	10:14
Total length:		2:03:58
