= Shine Like a Billion Suns =

Studio album by Boom Boom Satellites
- Released: February 4, 2015
- Recorded: 2013–2015
- Genre: Electronica, rock
- Length: 50:28
- Label: Sony Japan

Boom Boom Satellites chronology
Experienced II: Embrace Tour 2013 Budokan (2013)	Shine Like a Billion Suns (2015)

Singles from Shine Like a Billion Suns
- 1. "Only Blood" Released: August 6, 2014; 2. "A Hundred Suns" Released: January 8, 2015

Shine Like a Billion Suns is the ninth and final studio album from Japanese electronica/rock duo Boom Boom Satellites. Two editions of the album were released on February 4, 2015.

== Background ==
In 2014, Boom Boom Satellites created a new song, "Only Blood", for a special trailer for the film Monsterz. Boom Boom Satellites performed at the Tokyo Ex Theater Roppongi with Acidman on July 2, 2014. On July 4, 2014, the band announced that they will be composing the main theme, "Back In Black", for the upcoming anime adaptation of Ninja Slayer. In late November 2014, the band announced that they would be releasing their new album Shine Like a Billion Suns; they will support the album with a concert at the Tokyo EX Theater Roppongi in March 2015. On December 31, 2014, programmer Masayuki Nakano revealed in a blog post on their official website that the guitarist Michiyuki Kawashima's brain tumor issue had once again relapsed at the conclusion of their March 2014 tour, making it the fourth time he had suffered a relapse, and after diagnosis had only been given two more years to live. However, after they had read about boron neutron capture therapy, Kawashima underwent the procedure, all the while writing the new album. Kawashima was recently informed that the spread of the tumors had been successfully stopped, and the band decided to share the information with their fans. Nakano mentioned how proud he was for Kawashima to be able to go through the procedures, continue to tour, and write the album.

== Track listing ==
All tracks are written by Boom Boom Satellites

No.	Title	Length
1.	"Shine"	5:05
2.	"Only Blood"	4:47
3.	"Complicated"	5:08
4.	"A Hundred Suns"	4:49
5.	"Vanishing"	4:44
6.	"Back In Black"	5:05
7.	"The Moth (Attracted to the Flame)"	1:19
8.	"Blind Bird"	5:54
9.	"Overcome"	5:15
10.	"Stain"	2:38
11.	"Emergence"	5:44
Total length:		50:28
