= Embrace (Boom Boom Satellites album) =

Studio album by Boom Boom Satellites
- Released: January 9, 2013
- Genre: Electronica, rock
- Length: 50:38
- Label: Sony Japan, JPU Records

Boom Boom Satellites chronology
Remixed (2012)	Embrace (2013)	Experienced II: Embrace Tour 2013 Budokan (2013)

Singles from Embrace
- 1. "Broken Mirror" Released: June 6, 2012

Embrace is the eighth studio album by Japanese electronic/rock duo Boom Boom Satellites. Released on January 9, 2013, Embrace serves as the band's 15th anniversary release. Songs on the album include their single "Broken Mirror" and the song "Drifter", which was used in Sony's Xperia commercials. The album will also be sold in a deluxe edition that contains a DVD and a USB flash drive. JPU Records released the album in the UK, Europe and Russia on 2 September 2013. The CD version from JPU Records contained an exclusive remix of Snow.

To support the album, BBS are going on both a short pre-release party tour at Club Quattro locations in Shibuya, Tokyo; Umeda, Osaka; and Nagoya, Aichi Prefecture; and on a national tour following the album's release. The band will also livestream the final mastering of the album at New York City's Sterling Sound studio on Nico Nico Douga. The first promotional single from Embrace was a cover of the Beatles' "Helter Skelter", the duo's first ever cover song. This was followed by the release of another digital single of the track "Nine". In addition, album versions of previous promotional singles "Another Perfect Day" (released as a "Movie Edit") and "Drifter" (released as a "test run") are included on Embrace.

On December 29, 2012, the band revealed that, while on a doctor's visit, guitarist and vocalist Michiyuki Kawashima had been diagnosed with the symptoms of a brain tumor. The band decided to set aside January and March 2013 as the time Kawashima could undergo treatment and recover, cancelling 23 of the band's planned stops on their Embrace 2013 Tour.

== Reception ==
In 2020, Jonathan McNamara of The Japan Times listed Embrace as one of the 10 Japanese albums worthy of inclusion in Rolling Stone's 2020 list of the 500 greatest albums of all time, calling it "the band’s crowning achievement [...] a decidedly digital album that washes over you with all the raw soul and emotion that we let ourselves feel when we’re alone."

== Track listing ==
All tracks are written by Boom Boom Satellites, unless otherwise stated.

No.	Title	Writer(s)	Length
1.	"Another Perfect Day"		5:56
2.	"Helter Skelter" (album ver)	Lennon–McCartney	3:16
3.	"Broken Mirror"		6:20
4.	"Snow"		7:31
5.	"Flutter"		4:02
6.	"Disconnected"		4:14
7.	"Drifter"		4:58
8.	"Things'll Never Be the Same"		4:17
9.	"Embrace"		5:00
10.	"Nine"		4:59
Total length:			50:38

Limited edition DVD
No.	Title	Length
1.	"Broken MIrror"
2.	"Another Perfect Day"
3.	"Lock Me Out"
4.	"Back On My Feet"
5.	"Easy Action"
6.	"What Goes Around Comes Around"
7.	"Kick It Out"
8.	"Pill"
9.	"Moment I Count"
10.	"Push Eject"
