= Boom Boom Satellites =

Japanese electronic music duo

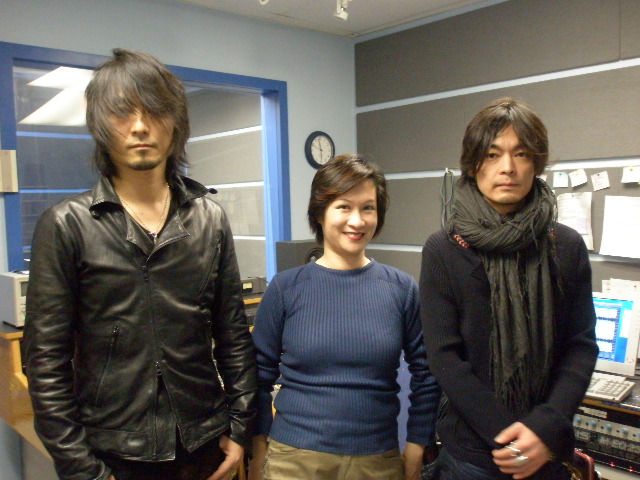
- Boom Boom Satellites with May S. Young (center) in 2009

Background information
- Origin: Tokyo, Japan
- Genres: Big beat; electropop; alternative rock; electronic; trip hop
- Years active: 1990–2016
- Labels: R&S; gr8!; JPU
- Past members: Michiyuki Kawashima; Masayuki Nakano
- Website: bbs.nakanomusic.com

Boom Boom Satellites (Japanese: ブンブンサテライツ, Hepburn: Bun Bun Sateraitsu) were a Japanese electronic music duo consisting of guitarist and vocalist Michiyuki Kawashima and bassist and programmer Masayuki Nakano. They were signed to Sony Music Entertainment Japan, with whom they released all of their albums in Japan.

== History ==
=== 1995–2014: Early career and growing popularity ===
Kawashima and Nakano formed the band in 1990, having met at university and debuted in Europe as a rock unit in 1997. According to an interview, the name originated from a song by Sigue Sigue Sputnik.

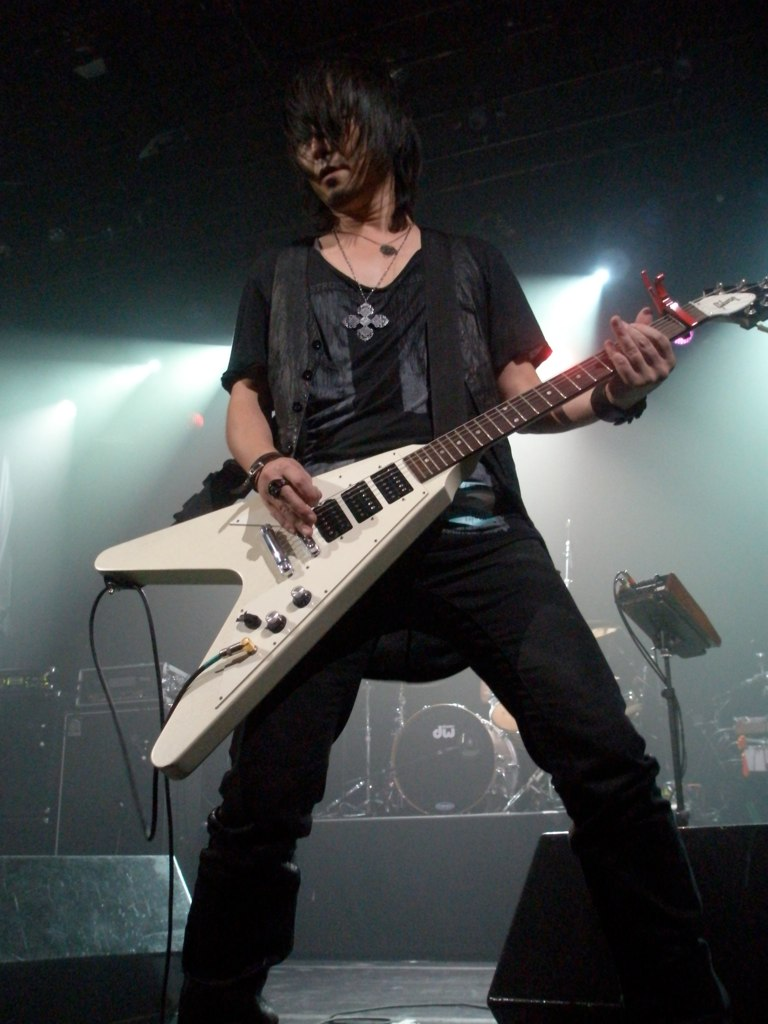
Michiyuki Kawashima performing at Irving Plaza, 2010

In 1995, the group's music debuted in Japan on a compilation album released by Torema Records, also affiliated with Untitled Records. Belgian record company R&S Records released their first single in Europe later that year. Kawashima and Nakano also appeared in the European magazine Melody Maker, where they were lauded as the combination of The Chemical Brothers and The Prodigy. R&S Records released their first album, 7 Ignitions/Auto Re-Birth, on April 1, 1998, and the group performed at a large music festival the following June. The group then returned to Japan. Boom Boom Satellites toured with Moby for three months in the United States some time afterward, and artists such as Garbage also requested remixes from the group.

The group has contributed numerous songs to various films, commercials, and television programs: In 2004, a number of tracks from the group's album, Full of Elevating Pleasures, contributed to the soundtrack of the CGI anime film Appleseed. In 2005, the song "What Goes Around Comes Around" from the album Exposed, was featured in a commercial for Dodge, and "Easy Action" was included on the soundtrack of the 2007 anime film Vexille. The same year, they played in the UK at the prestigious In The City music industry showcase festival. In 2008, the track "Scatterin' Monkey" from their 1998 album Out Loud, was featured in the film The Dark Knight and "Shut Up and Explode" became the opening theme song for the PlayStation Store exclusive and later anime television series Xam'd: Lost Memories (亡念のザムド, Bōnen no Zamudo). In 2009, the single "Back on My Feet" is an additional opening theme song for the television broadcast of the series (the TV broadcast switches between "Shut Up and Explode" and "Back on My Feet").

=== 2009–2014: Collaborations and production ===
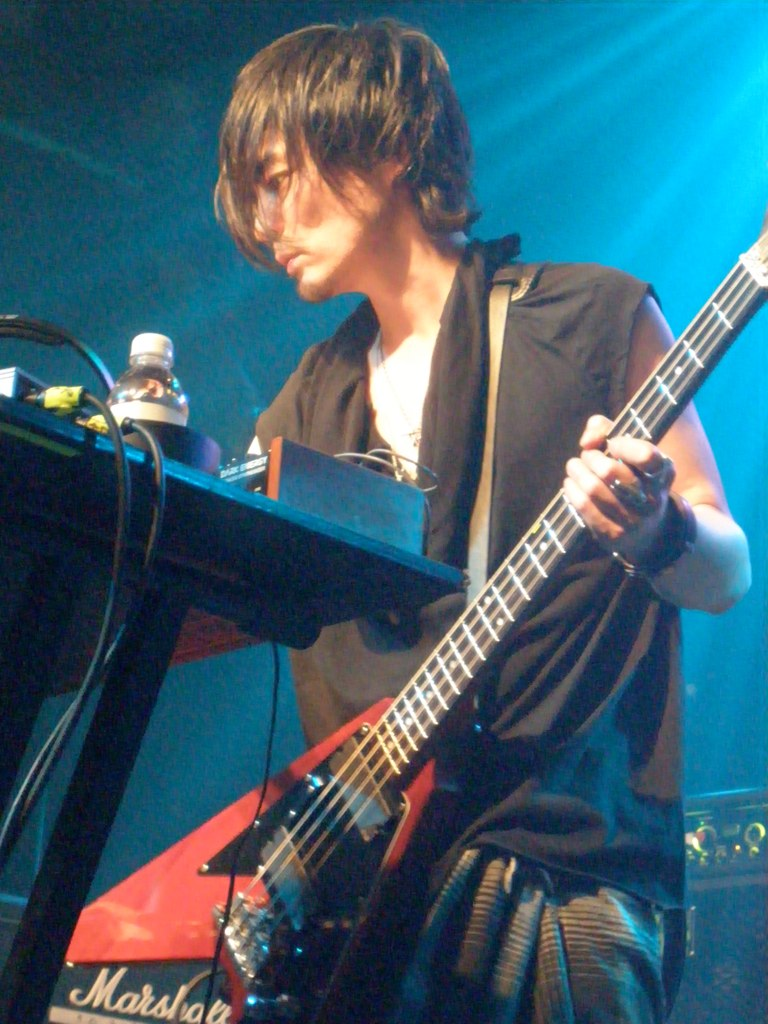
Masayuki Nakano on stage at Irving Plaza, 2010

In 2009, the band collaborated with Tahj Mowry and Flo Rida on a new envisioning of their track "Kick It Out". The track predominantly featured the lyrics of Tahj Mowry and Flo Rida in the verses, while the chorus remained the same as in the original release. Boom Boom Satellites added a new verse of their own not present on the original release. A music video was created for the song's release. That same year, Boom Boom Satellites released a remix for Fact's song "A Fact of Life" on the eponymous album.

In January 2010, Boom Boom Satellites released their first compilation album 19972007. The band released a new studio album in Japan, To the Loveless, on May 26, 2010, which featured many tracks from the Back on My Feet EP. A limited-edition version with a bonus DVD was also released. In late 2010, the Boom Boom Satellites kicked off a North American tour, beginning with a performance at New York Comic Con. They also released Over and Over (an abbreviated version of 19972007) in the United States to coincide with the tour.

In 2012, Boom Boom Satellites announced that they would be performing the theme song for the fifth episode of Mobile Suit Gundam Unicorn, titled "Broken Mirror", to begin the commemoration of their 15th anniversary since their debut. They also began a remix contest hosted by Nico Nico Douga, with the grand prize winner's remix of "Broken Mirror" included on their first remix album Remixed. This followed by the release of the song "Another Perfect Day" was used as the theme song of the Starship Troopers: Invasion animated movie. With the delay of the release of Remixed, the Boom Boom Satellites revealed that they were releasing their recent Japan-only singles internationally. Preceding the release of Remixed, Boom Boom Satellites announced that their entire back catalog had been added to the Japan iTunes Store.

To celebrate their 15th anniversary together, Boom Boom Satellites released their eighth studio album Embrace on January 9, 2013. For their first promotional single for the album, the duo recorded a cover of the Beatles' "Helter Skelter" as their first ever cover of any other artist. The Embrace 2013 tour had been planned to support the album as well as the group's 15th anniversary. However, in late December 2012 Kawashima was discovered to have symptoms of the early stages of a brain tumor, and the band cancelled all 23 shows scheduled from January to March 2013 to set aside for treatment and surgery; Nakano later revealed that Kawashima had a history of brain tumor issues, but this was the first time that they have had to cancel shows. The band decided that they would perform last few shows of December 2012, but had no plans to cancel the shows set for April and May 2013; the show in May was planned to be the band's first one-man live at the Nippon Budokan. On February 11, 2013, Nakano posted an update to the band's Facebook revealing that Kawashima had been discharged from the hospital and the two were writing and recording new songs. Following his recovery, the band announced that they were cancelling all but their Nippon Budokan show. This concert was later streamed live with 360 degree views on YouTube as part of YouTube Japan's Music Week as well as on Nico Nico Douga's live feature. In August 2013, they announced the concert would be released on an album due in November of that year, while also revealing that they were releasing Embrace internationally in September.

=== 2014: Kawashima's illness and death, dissolution ===
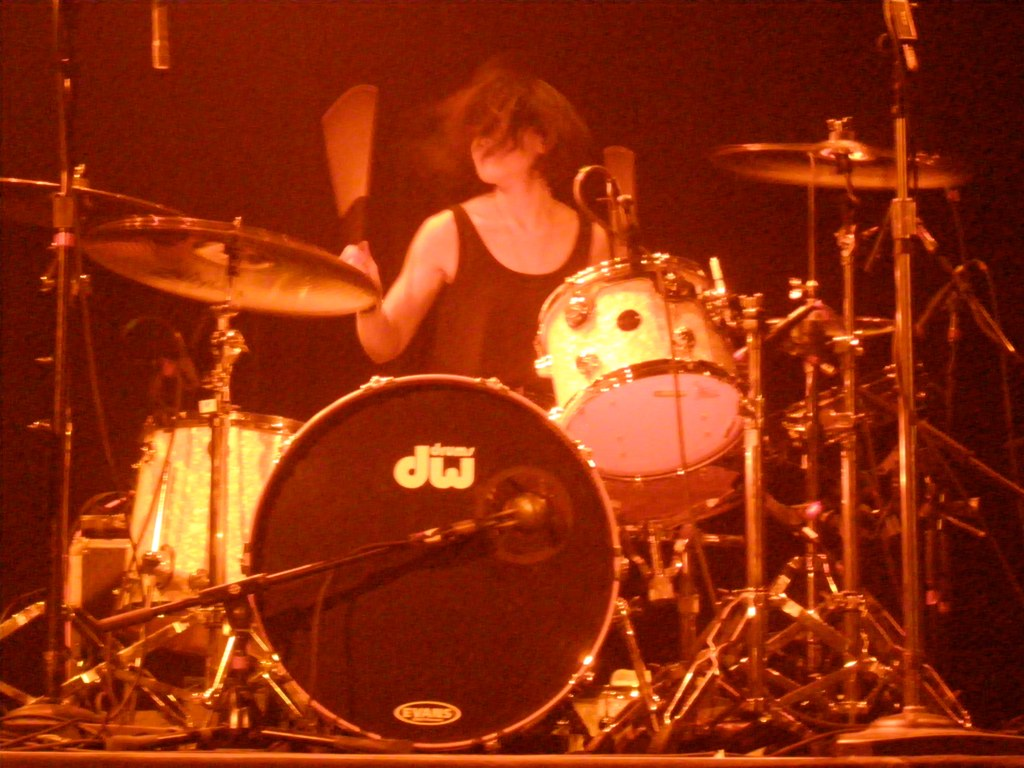
Support drummer Yoko Fukuda performing with Boom Boom Satellites in 2010

In 2014, Boom Boom Satellites created a new song, "Only Blood", for a special trailer for the film Monsterz. Boom Boom Satellites performed at the Ex Theater Roppongi with Acidman on July 2, 2014. On July 4, 2014, the band announced that they would be composing the main theme, "Back In Black", for the anime adaptation of Ninja Slayer. In late November 2014, the band announced that they would be releasing their new album Shine Like a Billion Suns in February 2015, supporting the album with a concert at the Tokyo EX Theater Roppongi in March 2015. On December 31, 2014, Nakano revealed in a blog post on their official website that Kawashima's brain tumor issue had once again relapsed at the conclusion of their March 2014 tour, making it the fourth time he had suffered a relapse, and after diagnosis had only been given two more years to live. However, after they had read about boron neutron capture therapy, Kawashima underwent the procedure, all the while writing the new album. Kawashima was informed that the spread of the tumors had been successfully stopped, and the band decided to share the information with their fans. Nakano mentioned how proud he was for Kawashima to be able to go through the procedures, continue to tour, and write the album.

In 2016, Boom Boom Satellites were announced to be performing the theme song for Kiznaiver titled "Lay Your Hands on Me". The version used for the anime was released as a single on April 17. A short music video was released on May 23, and it was announced that the full-size version of the song would be released digitally on June 1, followed by a physical/digital EP on June 22 featuring 3 other tracks. On the day of the release, Nakano posted on the official website and social media that the EP for "Lay Your Hands on Me" would be Boom Boom Satellites' final release, as Kawashima's tumors had relapsed for the fourth time and Kawashima was partially paralyzed. Nakano said that the "Lay Your Hands on Me" EP should be a suitable end to their career. On October 9, 2016, four months after the group stopped its activities, Kawashima died of his illness.

The next year, Nakano started to work with singer Toru Kitajima on intermittent songs in a project called Pandas, along with a remake of a theme song for Psycho-Pass: Sinners of the System. He formed a new band in 2021 called The Spellbound with The Novembers frontman Yusuke Kobayashi, releasing five singles from January to May of that year and releasing their debut album in 2022. Longtime Boom Boom Satellites support drummer Yoko Fukuda also followed Nakano to The Spellbound. In October 2022, they released "Subete ga Soko ni Arimasu you ni.", the ending theme for season four of the TV anime Golden Kamuy.

== Members ==
- Michiyuki Kawashima (川島 道行, Kawashima Michiyuki) – guitar, vocals
  - Born August 24, 1969, Iwate Prefecture (died October 9, 2016, aged 47)
  - Kawashima was married to actress Risa Sudou; they have two daughters.
- Masayuki Nakano (中野 雅之, Nakano Masayuki) – bass, programming
  - Born December 27, 1971 (age 54), Kanagawa Prefecture

=== Touring members ===
- Yoko Fukuda (福田 洋子, Fukuda Yōko) – drums (2009–2016)
  - Born July 29, 1977 (age 49), Kanagawa Prefecture
- Naoki Hirai (平井 直樹, Hirai Naoki) – drums (1995–2009)

== Discography ==
Studio albums

- Out Loud (1998)
- Umbra (2001)
- Photon (2002)
- Full of Elevating Pleasures (2005)
- On (2006)
- Exposed (2007)
- To the Loveless (2010)
- Embrace (2013)
- Shine Like a Billion Suns (2015)

EP's

- Boom Boom Satellites (1997) (Demo album)
- Joyride (1997)
- 7 Ignitions/Auto Re-Birth (1998)
- Lay Your Hands on Me (2016)

Live albums

- Experienced (2011)
- Experienced II: Embrace Tour 2013 Budokan (2013)

Compilation albums

- 19972007 (2010)
- Over and Over (2010)
- Remixed (2012)
- Remix Festival 2013 – Winners – (2013)

Singles

- "4 A Moment of Silence" (1997)
- "Dub Me Crazy (Ver. 02)" (1997)
- "Push Eject" (1998)
- "On The Painted Desert - Rampant Colors" (1999)
- "Fogbound" (2000)
- "Sloughin' Blue" (2001)
- "Soliloquy" (2001)
- "Blink" (2002)
- "Light My Fire" (2003)
- "Spine/Dive for You" (2004)
- "Easy Action" (2005)
- "Back on My Feet" (2009)
- "Kick It Out (feat. Tahj Mowry and Flo Rida)" (2009)
- "Broken Mirror" (2012)
- "Another Perfect Day" (2012)
- "Drifter" (2013)
- "Nine" (2013)
- "Only Blood" (2014)
- "A Hundred Suns" (2015)
- "Lay Your Hands on Me" (2016)

DVDs

- Epk (Promo) (2005)
- Fuji Rock Festival '05 Live Cuts (2006)
- Boom Boom Satellites Japan Tour '06 at Studio Coast (2007)
- Boom Boom Satellites Japan Tour 2008 (2009)
- Metamorphose 08 Live Cuts (2009)
- Front Chapter - The Final Session – Lay Your Hands On Me Special Live (2018)
