= Lay Your Hands on Me =

Lay Your Hands on Me may refer to:

== Music ==
- "Lay Your Hands on Me" (Peter Gabriel song)," a song on Peter Gabriel's 1982 album Peter Gabriel (album also known as Security)
- "Lay Your Hands on Me" (Thompson Twins song), a song on Thompson Twins' 1985 album Here's to Future Days
- "Lay Your Hands on Me" (Bon Jovi song), a 1988 song and 1989 single by rock band Bon Jovi
- Lay Your Hands on Me (album), a 1996 album by jazz saxophonist Art Porter, Jr.
- "Lay Your Hands on Me," a song on The Mission's 2001 album Aura
- "Lay Your Hands on Me," a song on Icehouse's 2002 remix album Meltdown
- "Lay Your Hands on Me," a song on Beth Hart's 2003 album Leave the Light On
- "Lay Your Hands on Me," a song on Lisa Stansfield's 2004 album The Moment
- "Lay Your Hands on Me" (Boom Boom Satellites song), a 2016 song and EP by Boom Boom Satellites

== Other uses ==
- "Lay Your Hands on Me" (Grey's Anatomy), a 2008 episode of the television series Grey's Anatomy
