= Innocence (Star Trek: Voyager) =

- Star Trek: Voyager episode
- Episode no.: Season 2 Episode 22
- Directed by: James L. Conway
- Story by: Anthony Williams
- Teleplay by: Lisa Klink
- Production code: 138
- Original air date: April 8, 1996

Guest appearances
- Marnie McPhail - Alcia; Tiffany Taubman - Tressa; Sarah Rayne - Elani; Tahj D. Mowry - Corin; Richard Garon - Ensign Bennet

Episode chronology
| ← Previous "Deadlock" | Next → "The Thaw" |
- Star Trek: Voyager season 2

"Innocence" is the 38th episode of Star Trek: Voyager, the 22nd episode of the second season. The episode aired on UPN on April 8, 1996.

Set in the late 24th century, the series follows the crew of the starship USS Voyager, after the ship was displaced to the Delta Quadrant, far from the rest of the Federation. In this episode, Tuvok is stranded on a planet with a group of three alien children being hunted by their own people.

== Plot ==
Tuvok crash-lands on a moon along with Ensign Bennet. Bennet does not survive and his remains are stored in a containment field in the damaged shuttle. Tuvok discovers three children, Tressa, Elani and Corin. They tell him the craft they were on also crashed, killing the adults. They convince him other members of their race, the Drayans, mean to do them harm. Tuvok helps the children elude a search party. Later, when the danger passes, they behave as children normally would, getting into things they should not and asking incessant questions as Tuvok tries to contact his ship.

The leader of the Drayans, Alcia, contacts Voyager to say they have found the shuttle and the crewman should be removed as soon as possible. The planet is sacred to the Drayans and their presence desecrates it.

Tuvok's efforts fail as two of the children, Elani and Corin, vanish in the middle of the night. Captain Janeway and Paris take a shuttle down to the surface while being pursued by other Drayans, who do not wish the shuttle to sully the sacredness of the moon. Soon, a confrontation occurs between the aliens and the Voyager crew. The crew believe the aliens mean to harm the last child, until it is finally explained that they were not children at all, but senile Drayans at the end of their life; their species ages in reverse.

Tressa recalls the truth about her circumstances. With Alcia's permission, Tuvok promises to stay with Tressa to the end.

== Production ==
Writer Lisa Klink previously wrote the episode Resistance (1995; S02 E12). She pitched the idea for "Innocence" and Michael Piller asked thematically "What's it about?" and Klink explained "It's about Tuvok as a father. How do Vulcans raise their children to be logical?" and they continued developing the episode from there.

Klink knew that Tim Russ could sing and wanted to include a Vulcan lullaby, which caused him some concern. She reassured him that "a Vulcan lullaby would be practical and include a lesson" and the composer chose a suitably somber melody. Klink even got inducted into the songwriters union ASCAP as a result.

Klink was pleased with how the episode turned out, highlighting it as one of her favorites. She was pleased with both the main storyline and B-story. She thought the performances were great, Tim Russ was great, "even the kids were good", and she was pleased with Robert Picardo's "perfect" comic delivery.

Marnie McPhail, who plays the Drayan leader "Alcia", also appeared that same year as "Ensign Eiger" in Star Trek: First Contact (1996).

== Reception ==
Keith R. A. DeCandido of Tor.com gave the episode 7 out of 10, and said it was an excellent episode and he would have rated it even higher except for the ending. In particular he praised Tim Russ proving "himself once again to be one of the best parts of Voyager" by bringing so much to the character of Tuvok "a strong sense of compassion, of efficiency, and of logic" and showing that he's an excellent parent. DeCandido was critical of the ending, and found the analogy "at best ignorant and at worst insulting."
