= To the Loveless =

- DVD edition cover

Studio album by Boom Boom Satellites
- Released: May 26, 2010
- Genre: Electronica, Alternative dance, alternative rock, industrial rock, noise rock, grebo
- Length: 70:35
- Label: Sony Japan

Boom Boom Satellites chronology
19972007 (2010)	To the Loveless (2010)	Over and Over (2010)

Singles from To the Loveless
- 1. "Back on My Feet" Released: July 1, 2009

To the Loveless is the seventh studio album by Japanese electronica/rock duo Boom Boom Satellites, their first full original album release since 2007. It is sold as both a regular CD version and a limited edition containing a DVD with the music videos for "Back on My Feet" and "Drain", a short documentary on the release of "Back on My Feet", and a live performance at Shibuya O-East. It was released on May 26, 2010. "Back On My Feet" was used as an alternate opening theme for Xam'd: Lost Memories; "Stay" is used in Japanese commercials for the Sony BRAVIA that feature footballer Atsuto Uchida.

== Release ==
"Back on My Feet" (stylized as "BACK ON MY FEET") is the only single taken from To the Loveless. It was released on July 1, 2009, and was their first release in two years. The title track "Back on My Feet" is used as an opening theme for the Japanese television broadcast of Xam'd: Lost Memories (alternating with "Shut Up And Explode" from Exposed). Two limited edition versions of the EP were released: one contained a DVD with the music video for "Back on My Feet" and the other was a special Bounen no Zamned version.

== Track list ==
All tracks are written by Boom Boom Satellites.

Standard Release CD
No.	Title	Length
1.	"Back on My Feet"	6:14
2.	"Drain"	5:26
3.	"Lock Me Out"	5:01
4.	"The Harder They Come, The Harder They Fall"	5:19
5.	"Undertaker"	5:18
6.	"All in a Day"	7:03
7.	"To the Loveless"	2:19
8.	"Vapour"	6:51
9.	"Spellbound"	2:37
10.	"Stay"	6:03
11.	"Caught in the Sun"	10:21
12.	"Fragment of Sanity"	2:16
13.	"Hounds"	5:41
Total length:		70:35

Limited Edition DVD
No.	Title	Length
1.	"Back on My Feet" (Premium Live @ Shibuya O-East)
2.	"Drain" (Music Video)
3.	"Back on My Feet" (Music Video)

== Personnel ==
Credits adapted from liner notes.

- Design, Artwork – Noriyuki Matsuo
- Drums [Additional] – Yoko Fukuda
- Mastered By – Ted Jensen
- Photography By, Artwork – Boom Boom Satellites
- Producer, Written-By – Boom Boom Satellites
