= Kiznaiver =

Japanese anime television series

- Promotional image featuring the main cast of characters. Clockwise from the top: Noriko, Tsuguhito, Honoka, Chidori, Katsuhira, Hajime, Nico, and Yoshiharu.

キズナイーバー (Kizunaībā)
- Genre: Action, science fiction
- Created by: Trigger, Mari Okada
- Manga
- Written by: Roji Karegishi
- Published by: ASCII Media Works
- English publisher: Crunchyroll (digital)
- Imprint: Dengeki Comics NEXT
- Magazine: Dengeki Maoh
- Original run: March 25, 2016 – February 27, 2017
- Volumes: 2
- Anime television series
- Directed by: Hiroshi Kobayashi
- Produced by: Masahiko Ōtsuka; Yōsuke Toba; Masayuki Nishide
- Written by: Mari Okada
- Music by: Yuki Hayashi
- Studio: Trigger
- Licensed by: Crunchyroll (streaming); NA: Aniplex of America (home video rights); UK: Anime Limited
- Original network: Tokyo MX, BS11, GYT, GYT, ABC, TVA
- English network: SEA: Aniplus Asia
- Original run: April 10, 2016 – June 26, 2016
- Episodes: 12
- Manga

Mini! Kiznaiver Theater
- Written by: S.Kosugi
- Published by: Kadokawa Shoten
- English publisher: Crunchyroll (digital)
- Imprint: Dengeki Comics NEXT
- Magazine: Dengeki Maoh
- Original run: April 27, 2016 – June 27, 2016
- Volumes: 1
- icon

Kiznaiver (キズナイーバー, Kizunaībā) is a 2016 Japanese anime television series produced by Trigger, Aniplex, and Crunchyroll and written by Mari Okada. The series features character designs by Shirow Miwa. It also features the directorial debut of Hiroshi Kobayashi, assistant director of the anime Rage of Bahamut and episode director for Kill la Kill.

Kiznaiver follows seven high school students who are chosen to be a part of an experimental program promoting world peace which creates bonds between people by forcing them to share each other's pain. The series' title and premise are based upon the Japanese words for "wound/scar" (傷, kizu), and "bond/connection" (絆, kizuna); other than the word "naive" (ナイーブ, naibu).

== Plot ==
Kiznaiver takes place in the futuristic, fictional Japanese town of Sugomori City. While the city appears to be normal, it was created to test a large-scale experiment known as the Kizna System, which connects people through shared pain and suffering, both physical and emotional. Those who are connected to the system are called "Kiznaivers".

A few days before the start of summer vacation, a mysterious and seemingly emotionless girl, Noriko Sonozaki, tells high school student Katsuhira Agata and several of his classmates that they have been selected to become Kiznaivers. Sharing each other's pain allows them to build bonds between their differing lives and personalities.

== Characters ==
Katsuhira Agata (阿形 勝平, Agata Katsuhira)
Voiced by: Yuki Kaji (Japanese); Rylan Strachan (English)
The story's apathetic and "semi-emotionless" protagonist. His Japanese sin is the Imbecile, resembling the deadly sin of Sloth.
Noriko Sonozaki (園崎 法子, Sonozaki Noriko)
Voiced by: Hibiku Yamamura (Japanese); Natasha Strickey (English)
A beautiful girl who lacks human kindness and displays no emotion whatsoever. She is in charge of the Kizna System and therefore brings the seven Kiznaivers together through various missions.
Chidori Takashiro (高城 千鳥, Takashiro Chidori)
Voiced by: Yuka Terasaki (Japanese); Caitlynne Medrek (English)
Katsuhira's childhood friend who is humanistic, emotional, and seemingly nosy at times. Her Japanese sin is the Goody Two-Shoes, resembling the deadly sin of Envy.
Hajime Tenga (天河 一, Tenga Hajime)
Voiced by: Tomoaki Maeno (Japanese); Lucas Gilbertson (English)
A delinquent who is excessively impulsive and rowdy, but very protective of his friends. His Japanese sin is the Musclehead Thug, resembling the deadly sin of Wrath.
Nico Niiyama (新山 仁子, Niiyama Niko)
Voiced by: Misaki Kuno (Japanese); Katrina Salisbury (English)
An energetic girl who behaves in an eccentric manner by claiming she "sees fairies". Her Japanese sin is the Eccentric Headcase, resembling the deadly sin of Greed.
Tsuguhito Yuta (由多 次人, Yuta Tsuguhito)
Voiced by: Nobunaga Shimazaki (Japanese); Scott Roberts (English)
A sly and self-centered honors student and ladies' man. His Japanese sin is the Two-Faced Normie, resembling the deadly sin of Gluttony.
Honoka Maki (牧 穂乃香, Maki Honoka)
Voiced by: Rina Satō (Japanese); Lori Bachynski (English)
An aloof and intelligent girl who outwardly maintains a cold and condescending attitude towards others. Her Japanese sin is the High-and-Mighty, resembling the deadly sin of Pride.
Yoshiharu Hisomu (日染 芳春, Hisomu Yoshiharu)
Voiced by: Kōtarō Nishiyama (Japanese); Hans Wackershauser (English)
A handsome and distinct man shrouded in mystery. His Japanese sin is the Immoralist, resembling the deadly sin of Lust.
Kazunao Yamada (山田 一直, Yamada Kazunao)
Voiced by: Junichi Suwabe (Japanese); Michael Adamthwaite (English)
An apathetic man who has no motivation to work hard. He is Urushibara's colleague and a member of the Kizna Committee, moonlighting as the high school chemistry teacher.
Mutsumi Urushibara (漆原睦, Urushibara Mutsumi)
Voiced by: Mie Sonozaki (Japanese); Jennifer Cameron (English)
An initially cold and sarcastic woman who has caring and motherly qualities. She is Yamada's colleague and a member of the Kizna Committee, moonlighting as the high school counselor.

== Media ==
=== Manga ===
A tie-in manga by Roji Karegishi was published simultaneously by Crunchyroll digitally and by Kadokawa Shoten in their Dengeki Maoh magazine. It premiered on March 25, 2016, and ended on February 27, 2017. It was compiled in two volumes.

A gag manga featuring the characters in chibi form called "Mini! Kiznaiver Gekijō" (みにっ! きずないーばー劇場) is drawn by S. Kosugi and serialized on Dengeki Comics NEXT. The tankōbon version was released on June 6, 2016. Crunchyroll took the English license for it, titled "Mini! KIZNAIVER Theater".

=== Anime ===
Kiznaiver is an original anime series from Trigger. It is directed by Hiroshi Kobayashi and written by Mari Okada. While Shirow Miwa provides original character design, Mai Yoneyama adapted it into anime. The opening theme is Lay Your Hands on Me by Boom Boom Satellites, and the ending theme is Hajimari no Sokudo (はじまりの速度) by Sangatsu no Phantasia. The anime has been licensed in the UK by Anime Limited.

No.	Title	Directed by	Written by	Original release date	Ref.
1	"Sometimes, a Bond Can Bloom from the First Day Eye Contact Is Made"; Transliteration: "Hitome Atta Sono Hi kara, Kizuna no Hanasaku Koto mo Aru" (Japanese: 一目あったその日から、絆の花咲くこともある)	Yoshihiro Miyajima	Mari Okada	April 10, 2016	
High school student Katsuhira Agata is a boy who seems to feel no emotions or pain, and a frequent target of bullying. Shortly before summer break, he meets a strange girl, Noriko Sonozaki, who compares his classmates with the seven deadly sins before pushing him down a flight of stairs as part of an experiment. He wakes up in an underground hospital room with five other classmates, where Noriko tells them how she abducted and experimented on them, enlisting the aid of people dressed as white Gomorin, Sugomori City's mascot. However, all but Katsuhira leave the room in disinterest. As Katsuhira learns that the fall would have killed him if the experiment had not dispersed his injuries across the other classmates, Noriko reveals that all the classmates are now Kiznaivers, connected through the experimental Kizna System via scars on their wrists.
2	"If You Can Swallow a Bizarre Situation Like This So Easily, Two Buckets of Barium Shouldn't Be a Problem"; Transliteration: "Konna Ijou Jitai Kantan ni Nomi Komen Nara Bariumu Nanza Baketsu Nihai wa Karuku Yoyuu Dattsuuno" (Japanese: こんな異常事態カンタンに飲みこめんなら、バリウムなんざバケツ二杯は軽く余裕だっつーの)	Keisuke Shinohara	Mari Okada	April 17, 2016	
Noriko traps the Kiznaivers in a hallway of the building and tasks them with introducing themselves to each other. If they do not cooperate, they are subjected to painful and life-threatening situations. It is eventually revealed that the true goal is to have them confess secrets to each other, such as Hajime Tenga having cynophobia. As Noriko initiates a countdown for a demolition, Nico Niiyama reveals her disbelief in fairies, halting the countdown. Tsuguhito Yuta is exposed for being overweight during elementary school for a toothbrush award. Outside of the building, Katsuhira introduces himself as someone who feels nothing, while inside a crate attached to a crane. When his childhood friend Chidori Takashiro confesses her love for him, he suddenly feels happiness and reintroduces himself as someone slowly learning his own feelings. Afterwards, Honoka Maki shares her secret of having killed someone.
3	"Depending on How You Look At It, I Think We Could Get Through Anything... Right?"; Transliteration: "Donna ni Sanzan na Joukyou Datte Torae Kata Shidai de Nantoka Yatteikeru kamo...... ne?" (Japanese: どんなにさんざんな状況だって、捉えかた次第でなんとかやっていけるかも……ねっ?)	Yūichi Shimohira	Mari Okada	April 24, 2016	
After Honoka plays off her secret as a lie, the six Kiznaivers later begin to feel "residual pain", which was mistakenly first felt after Hajime fell off Katsuhira's apartment balcony. This feeling occurs more than once during the day, prompting Noriko to task the six Kiznaivers with tracking down a missing seventh member, whose pain they all can feel. After no one in their class reacts in pain when the Kiznaivers harm each other, they deduce the missing member to be Yoshiharu Hisomu, the only student that has been absent since the start of school. They try to confront Yoshiharu at his apartment, but he runs away and a chase ensues. Finding Yoshiharu by an overpass, Katsuhira jumps off in an attempt to convince him that they are all connected. While Katsuhira lands painfully inside a nearby convertible, the other Kiznaivers learn that Yoshiharu is aroused by pain. Meanwhile, Noriko hosts a conference regarding the Kizna System to government officials with the aim of the "true connection".
4	"Now That We're All Connected, Let's All Get to Know Each Other Better, 'Kay?"; Transliteration: "Sekkaku Tsunagari Attandashi sa Motto Otagai Wakari Aou Yon" (Japanese: せっかく繋がりあったんだしさ、もっとお互いわかりあおうよん)	Naoki Murata	Mari Okada	May 1, 2016	
In his apartment with the other Kiznaivers, Katsuhira awakes from a flashback involving a young Noriko. Yoshiharu explains to the others of his fondness of masochism, taking pleasure in fatally dangerous and unexpected pain. After Nico, Tsuguhito, and Honoka leave, Yoshiharu reveals to Katsuhira, Chidori, and Hajime of how he secretly submitted to the Kizna System just for the stimulation, a promise made by Noriko herself. After Yoshiharu finally shows up to class, Nico advises the Kiznaivers to exchange email addresses as a step to become friends. Noriko invites the Kiznaivers to a "summer camp" at a resort, where she later informs them about the history and her involvement of the Kizna System experimented in Sugomori City. On the way through the woods, Chidori jealously notices a relationship growing between Katsuhira and Noriko, much to Hajime's attention. Meanwhile, another car approaches the resort carrying Kamaishi and Yoshizawa, two of Katsuhira's bullies, revealing that they are also Kiznaivers.
5	"Wahoo, It's a Training Camp! Let's Step in Deer Poop and Have Pillow Fights! Go, Go!"; Transliteration: "Hyahhoi, Gasshuku Daa! Shika no Fun Funde Makuranage Shite Go Go!" (Japanese: ひゃっほい、合宿だぁ! 鹿のフン踏んで枕投げしてゴーゴー!)	Takashi Tagashira	Mari Okada	May 8, 2016	
As the group settles in at the resort, they divide the chores with cooking and chopping wood. However, Hajime repeatedly fails to bring Katsuhira and Chidori closer together over their meal. At night, Chidori runs away when she misunderstands Noriko slapping Katsuhira on the cheek, but only to swat a mosquito. When Honoka catches Tsuguhito sneaking a midnight meal despite his low appetite during the day, she attempts to seduce him against his will. This is interrupted when Noriko introduces chemistry teacher Kazunao Yamada and school counselor Mutsumi Urushibara as Kizna Committee members. With Chidori still missing in the woods, Yamada and Urushibara put the other Kiznaivers through a test of bravery until they find Chidori. Meanwhile, Chidori is chased inside a shed by Kamaishi wearing a Gomorin costume, and she realizes that he is a Kiznaiver. Chidori berates Kamaishi about the pain that his bullying towards Katsuhira has caused her, drawing the other Kiznaivers to the shed. This makes Katsuhira realize that he was never alone in his suffering.
6	"Nothing Good Comes From Being Around All of You"; Transliteration: "Anta-tachi to Iru to Hontto ni Rokuna Koto ga Nai" (Japanese: あんた達といると、ほんっとにろくなことがない)	Be Loop; Hideyuki Satake	Mari Okada	May 15, 2016	
A flashback of Honoka and a cheerful girl named Ruru is shown. Noriko contacts the Kiznaivers to explain that they were successfully able to connect pain through their hearts. At Katsuhira's apartment, Tsuguhito does not show up and Honoka decides to leave early. At a restaurant, Tsuguhito's friends are enamored by a yuri manga under the pen name Charles de Macking, but a chord strikes within Tsuguhito when he recognizes a line in the manga that Honoka has said, prompting him to leave. Honoka is approached by an editor, who seeks to obtain the rights to produce her manga as a movie. After Tsuguhito stops him, Honoka runs off in anger. As Tsuguhito later shares a piece of Honoka's past as a manga author to the other Kiznaivers, Noriko assigns them a special mission to save her. Honoka arrives at the school, surrounded by a film crew, causing her to break down with a massive pain signal. The rest of the group manage to find her and drive away the film crew. While Honoka runs off in utter shock, Katsuhira expresses his disappointment in Noriko by how halfhearted the mission felt.
7	"A Battle Touching Upon the Identity of the Pain that's Seven Times the Pain of One-Seventh of a Pain"; Transliteration: "Nana-bun no Ichi no Itami no Sono Mata Nana Bai no Shoutai ni Fureru Tatakai" (Japanese: 七分の一の痛みの、そのまた七倍の正体に触れる戦い)	Yoshihiro Miyajima	Mari Okada	May 22, 2016	
The Kiznaivers except Honoka visit the parents of Ruru, learning about her terminal kidney disease that led to her inevitable death. Meanwhile, Honoka reminisces about her time with Ruru when they were a manga artist duo under the pen name Charles de Macking. They were best friends, but Ruru started developing feelings for Honoka, which created a wedge and drove them apart, so Ruru made the last chapter on her own. As Honoka's heartache resonates within the other Kiznaivers, they set out to form a lasting friendship with her. Although a withdrawn Honoka ignores their calls in her room, her heart is touched when Nico has an outburst of concern. During a downpour, Honoka encounters Tsuguhito reading her manga, but he is surprised to learn that she has never read the last chapter. As Tsuguhito and Honoka meet up with the other Kiznaivers attempting to light up sparklers at the beach, Honoka suggests that they should swim, despite the weather. Honoka reaches the end of the manga and her heart is at ease, as Ruru's message was a sign of forgiveness. Honoka assures the others that they are closer as Kiznaivers rather than friends or lovers.
8	"Happy Times Don't Tend to Last Very Long"; Transliteration: "Happii na Jikan tte Sousou Nagaku wa Tsuzukanai Mono da yo ne" (Japanese: ハッピーな時間って、そうそう長くは続かないものだよね)	Kandai	Mari Okada	May 29, 2016	
Yamada and Urushibara analyze that Honoka is lovestruck based on her deeper level of above pain. As a typhoon approaches Sugimori City, the Kiznaivers are kidnapped by several Gomorin and taken back to the school. Yamada shows them a slideshow presentation covering the details of a previous Kizna experiment done many years ago on children to connect the entire spectrum of sensations including pain. When Hajime questions the inhumane methods despite the true aim for world peace, Yamada leaves the Kiznaivers at school with another mission to get home safely. However, this is part of Yamada's plan to stimulate romantic connections among the Kiznaivers, who have been chased to separate areas of the school and must find a way out. Hajime causes Nico to transmit flustered emotions in a classroom, while an irritated Yoshiharu angers Honoka at a stairwell by touching on her internal trauma, but Tsuguhito manages to calm down Honoka. Meanwhile at a rooftop, as Chidori attempts to confess her feelings for Katsuhira, he immediately runs and jumps off, saving Noriko from a falling statue after she exits an underground subway station. Noriko then removes her diamond choker, revealing a glowing Kizna scar on her nape.
9	"It's All Over......I Think"; Transliteration: "Banjikyuusu......kashira" (Japanese: 万事休す……かしら)	Keisuke Shinohara	Mari Okada	June 5, 2016	
Noriko collapses after telling Katsuhira that he exists within her. After the other Kiznaivers take shelter in the audio-visual room, Yamada remotely screens Katsuhira and Noriko in the gymnasium onto a projector, revealing to the others how Noriko's Kizna scar is tied to Katsuhira's visions of the past. As Hajime rallies the other Kiznaivers to the gymnasium, Katsuhira is finally able to piece together his past from twelve years ago with other experimented children. Noriko unbuttons Katsuhira's shirt, which unveils a second Kizna scar on his chest, and he embraces her in tears. When the other Kiznaivers arrive, Katsuhira is prompted to chase after Chidori. Katsuhira grabs Chidori's hand and her Kizna scar glows red, while her inner voice begs to be held. As Urushibara goes against Yamada and tries to stop the Kiznaivers before things get any worse, the Kiznaivers begin to suffer from their inner sorrows as a result of their broken friendship, and the culmination of everyone's inner thoughts leaves them writhing in pain as their red Kizna scars flicker. When the rain clears out, Urushibara and Noriko confront the recovering Kiznaivers and assures them that the Kizna System will be released once summer is over.
10	"You Knew Very Well That Your Romantic Feelings Might Be Unrequited, Right?"; Transliteration: "Suki na Kimochi ga Mukuwarenai kamo Nante Juujuu Shouchi no Ue daro?" (Japanese: 好きな気持ちがむくわれないかもなんて、重々承知の上だろ?)	Satoshi Takashi	Mari Okada	June 12, 2016	
The Kiznaivers decide not to keep in touch until the next school year begins, due to being able to sense each other's inner sorrows, which by then all their Kizna scars have disappeared. After Yamada starts his class with discreet humiliation for the Kiznaivers, this encourages Nico to reconnect with Katsuhira and Yoshiharu. Noriko attempts a suicidal jump from the roof in a drastic bid for proof of the results of the Kizna System, and Katsuhira's remaining Kizna scar reacts to her. Katsuhira, Nico, and Yoshiharu find the passage into the underground subway station, meeting up with Urushibara, who says that Noriko only fell unconscious. Urushibara further explains that Katsuhira and Noriko were among nineteen test subjects during the first Kiznaiver experiment twelve years ago. Noriko received the full force of the pain rather than the pain being evenly distributed among the others. She began taking medicine to numb her senses, which affected the other children as well, including Katsuhira. When Katsuhira finds five other children who were released twelve years ago, childhood memories pour out of him as they look at him with still faces.
11	"We Have To Contact Each Other And Confirm Our Feelings. Because We're Friends!"; Transliteration: "Ichiichi Renraku Shiatte Kimochi wo Kakunin Shiawanaito. Datte, Tomodachi Nanda kara!" (Japanese: いちいち連絡しあって気持ちを確認しあわないと。だって、友達なんだから!)	Masahiko Ōtsuka	Mari Okada	June 19, 2016	
While Katsuhira is still overwhelmed by his past before him, a bedridden Noriko confides in Yamada that she jumped off the roof because she was searching for something that she saw twelve years ago. After saying goodbye to Urushibara, Nico points out to Katsuhira and Yoshiharu that they will have to connect on their own, since they cannot rely on the Kizna System anymore. At the apartment, Katsuhira calls Chidori to tell her that he met the five released children described as dolls, apologizes to her for never understanding, and thanks her for protecting him. The next day, as Katsuhira and Noriko interrupt class to talk in private, Katsuhira believes that he wanted to help Noriko in the Kizna System in order to regain his pain, but she says that he is wrong. After class, Katsuhira gathers the other Kiznaivers to assess the validity of their friendship since the very start. Later talking to Urushibara, the Kiznaivers discover that they are still bonded even though they are no longer connected through the Kizna System. Noriko suddenly appears in the middle of Sugomori City, offering to bond with everyone.
12	"If The Kizna System Spread Throughout The World"; Transliteration: "Sekaijuu ni Kizuna System ga Hirogatte" (Japanese: 世界中に、キズナシステムが広がって)	Hiroshi Kobayashi; Yoshihiro Miyajima; Yuro Tagashira	Mari Okada	June 26, 2016	
Noriko broadcasts her voice throughout Sugomori City in an effort to connect with all the citizens using a horde of black Gomorin. While driving to the main bridge, Urushibara tells Katsuhira that Noriko carries all his wounds, but she is obsessed with surpassing the limits of the Kizna System to save the five dolls. Kamaishi and Yoshizawa have received special Kizna scars on their abdomens, but Hajime is still strong enough to defeat them. As Katsuhira and Urushibara finally approach Noriko at the main bridge which has slightly opened, the other Kiznaivers express their friendship in the Kizna System. However, Katsuhira wants Noriko to share her wounds with him and let go. Katsuhira falls in and tries to save her when she fall in the river, both of them surviving in the end, with Katsuhira rejoicing over being able to feel pain again. Tsuguhito and Honoka share an ice cream cone together, hinting that Honoka wants Tsuguhito to put on some weight. In the mall, Chidori and Hajime make up and start dating, but Nico secretly tells Yoshiharu that she still pines for Hajime. While recovering in the hospital, Katsuhira and Noriko become closer and start to re-experience their emotions together.
