= The Thaw (Star Trek: Voyager) =

- Star Trek: Voyager episode
- Episode no.: Season 2 Episode 23
- Directed by: Marvin V. Rush
- Story by: Richard Gadas
- Teleplay by: Joe Menosky
- Production code: 139
- Original air date: April 29, 1996

Guest appearances
- Michael McKean - The Clown; Thomas Kopache - Viorsa; Carel Struycken - Spectre; Tony Carlin - Kohl Physician; Shannon O'Hurley - Kohl Programmer; Patty Maloney - Little Woman

Episode chronology
| ← Previous "Innocence" | Next → "Tuvix" |
- Star Trek: Voyager season 2

"The Thaw" is the 39th episode of Star Trek: Voyager, the 23rd episode of the second season. The episode aired on UPN on April 29, 1996.

Set in the late 24th century, the series follows the crew of the starship USS Voyager, after the ship was displaced to the Delta Quadrant, far from the rest of the Federation. In this episode, the crew finds a planet which has been devastated by a solar flare. A few survivors are found inside hibernation pods. Although seemingly asleep, the crew discovers them to be trapped in a shared virtual environment while terrorized by a sadistic clown.

== Plot ==
Voyager discovers a planet that nineteen years before suffered a major ecological disaster. The crew finds a set of stasis pods containing five of the planet's inhabitants; two are dead from heart attacks, and the other three should have been reawakened already. Since the planet has recovered from the disaster, Captain Kathryn Janeway decides to revive the other three, but the crew cannot wake them, since their brains are tied to a central computer connecting all the pods. B'Elanna Torres and Harry Kim volunteer to occupy the other pods and to be connected to the central computer.

They find themselves experiencing a virtual reality, a strange, dark circus-like atmosphere. A sadistic clown appears to lead the group of computer-generated characters, attempting to bring the new arrivals to play. Torres and Kim learn from the aliens that the virtual reality was intended to make a utopia based on their thoughts, but grew on their fears instead and gained the power to induce death. Torres makes a deal with the clown to leave stasis to explain the situation to Voyager, leaving Kim and the aliens behind as hostages.

The clown, while waiting, prepares to torture Kim. Just as the clown is about to slice him with a scalpel, his hand is stopped by The Doctor, who as a hologram is immune to the simulation's powers. The Doctor explains that Janeway is prepared to provide the clown a simulated brain in exchange for Kim and the aliens. However, the clown reads from his captives' minds that a simulated brain will not be the same as a real one, and refuses. Before the Doctor returns to report to Janeway, one of the aliens provides a subtle hint of how to dismantle the computer system.

With this information, Torres begins to shut down the simulation. The clown notices the deception as elements of the program are removed, and kills the alien that gave the hint. Janeway stops Torres before the clown takes another life. The Doctor, after communicating with the crew, informs the clown that Janeway will offer herself as a brain for the system in exchange for the remaining hostages. The clown agrees, and soon Janeway appears in the simulation while the remaining hostages are freed. Too late, the clown realizes that Janeway too is a hologram, her mind only minimally connected to the system. With no living being left connected, the crew finish disabling the computer. As the clown fades away, the Janeway hologram tells him that in the end, fear wants to be defeated.

== Production ==
The teleplay was written by Joe Menosky with the story by Richard Gadas. The episode was directed by Marvin V. Rush. Rush was the director of photography on The Next Generation and directed the episode The Host. He was hired to direct an episode before it was written, and it was pure luck that he got The Thaw rather than being chosen for his visual expertise. When he read the script he said "it was a subject matter and a notion that really resonated with me", he saw it as an essay on the nature of fear and he really wanted to tell the story. Visually he was inspired by Federico Fellini's 8½.

The show features several guest stars including: Thomas Kopache, Carel Struycken, Tony Carlin, and Shannon O'Hurley. A major character in the plot, the 'fear clown', is played by guest star Michael McKean.

== Reception ==
In 2017, this episode was noted as featuring scary and eerie Star Trek content. In 2012, Den of Geek ranked this the seventh best episode of Star Trek: Voyager, but calling it creepy, for including a virtual "clown of fear". In 2014, Io9 ranked "The Thaw"'s clown as the sixth least threatening villain of Star Trek.

In 2021, ScreenRant ranked "The Thaw" the eighth scariest episode of all Star Trek franchise episodes, and the scariest of the Voyager series.

== See also ==
- Suspended animation in fiction
