= Tahj Mowry =

American actor (born 1986)

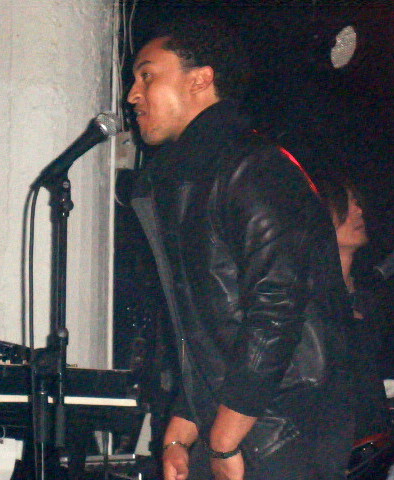
- Mowry performing in November 2009
- Born: Tahj Dayton Mowry; May 17, 1986 (age 40); Honolulu, Hawaii, U.S.
- Education: Pepperdine University
- Occupations: Actor; singer
- Years active: 1990–present
- Relatives: Tia Mowry (sister); Tamera Mowry (sister)

Tahj Dayton Mowry (/tɑːʒ ˈmɔːri/; born May 17, 1986) is an American actor and singer. He is the brother of identical twin actors, Tia Mowry and Tamera Mowry, and is known for his role as TJ on Smart Guy. Mowry was cast as the voice of ten-year-old super genius, Wade Load, on Kim Possible as a nod to this role. He is also known for his roles as Michelle Tanner's best friend, Teddy, on Full House, and Tucker Dobbs on Freeform's comedy show, Baby Daddy.

== Early life ==
Tahj Dayton Mowry was born in Honolulu, Hawaii, on May 17, 1986. His mother, Darlene Renée (née Flowers), managed her children's careers. His father, Timothy John Mowry, became a custody officer/jailer with the City of Glendale Police Department when the family moved to California.

His father has British and Irish ancestry, and his mother is of Afro-Bahamian descent. His parents met in high school in Miami, Florida. Both joined the U.S. Army, and eventually reached the rank of Sergeant. His older twin sisters are Tia and Tamera Mowry and he also has a younger brother named Tavior. He played football at Birmingham High School in Lake Balboa before transferring to Westlake High School in Thousand Oaks, California, and one season of football at Savannah State University and the University of Wyoming. He attended Pepperdine University in Malibu, California, where his sisters Tia and Tamera both graduated.

== Career ==
Mowry starred and is perhaps best known as T.J. Henderson, a child prodigy, on the sitcom Smart Guy. He also played Teddy on the sitcom Full House. Mowry has appeared in Disney Channel movies such as Hounded and The Poof Point. He had a guest role on the Disney Channel Original Series, The Suite Life of Zack & Cody and in a Star Trek: Voyager episode titled "Innocence". Mowry appeared in the movie Are We Done Yet? as Danny Pulu and in Seventeen Again as Willie Donovan. Mowry also had an appearance in one episode in the fourth season of Desperate Housewives. He guest-starred on an episode of The Game as Melanie Barnett's brother, acting alongside his real-life sister Tia who played Melanie Barnett in the series. Mowry performed the voice of Wade in the Disney Channel animated series Kim Possible.

He sang "Shine Your Light On Me" for School's Out! Christmas, "Circle of Life'" on the Disney Channel Circle of Stars recording of The Lion King included on the Platinum Edition DVD, and was featured on a single called "Kick It Out" with Boom Boom Satellites and Flo Rida. Mowry also appeared in an episode of Friends where Phoebe sings to kindergartners.

He starred as Tucker Dobbs in the ABC Family sitcom Baby Daddy, which premiered on June 20, 2012. Mowry released his debut single called "Flirt", produced by Excel Beats, in April 2015. He released a six-song EP titled Future Funk on August 4, 2015. It featured tracks like "Bossy", "Dancing Alone", and "End of the Road". He appeared on the daytime talk show The Real with his sister and co-host Tamera Mowry and was a guest co-host for three episodes. In 2023, he began starring in the Disney+ series The Muppets Mayhem.

== Personal life ==
Mowry dated actress Naya Rivera between 2000 and 2004, after the two worked together on Smart Guy in the 1990s.

== Filmography ==
=== Film ===
Year	Title	Role	Notes
1991	Rappin' n' Rhymin'	Himself	
1994	Disney Sing Along Songs: Let's Go to the Circus	Himself	
1999	We Wish You a Merry Christmas	Ollie	Voice
2000	Seventeen Again	Willie Donovan	
2001	Hounded	Jay Martin	
2001	The Poof Point	Eddie Ballard	
2003	Kim Possible: A Sitch in Time	Wade Load	Voice
2004–2005	Hermie series	Webster	Voice
2005	Kim Possible Movie: So the Drama	Wade Load	Voice
2007	Are We Done Yet?	Danny Pulu	
2021	Welcome Matt	Matt	
2021	Let's Get Merried	Finn	
2022	Me Time	Kabir	

=== Television ===
Year	Title	Role	Notes
1990	Who's the Boss?	Greg	Episode: "Who's Minding the Kid?"
1991–1995	Full House	Teddy	14 episodes
1992–1993	Out All Night	Shavon	5 episodes
1993	Where I Live	Jimmy	Episode: "The Terminator"
1994	Sonic the Hedgehog	Young Sonic (voice)	Episode: "Blast to the Past"
1994–1995	Aladdin	King Mamoud, Tanti	Voice, 2 episodes
1995–1998	Sister, Sister	Cousin Tahj; Sammy T.J	4 episodes
1995–1999	The Lion King's Timon & Pumbaa	Nefu	Episode: "Rafiki's Apprentice"; Credited, presumably replaced by Dana Hill
1995	What-a-Mess	Additional voices	Season 3
1996	Star Trek: Voyager	Corin	Episode: "Innocence"
1996	Minor Adjustments	Kenny	Episode: "A Christmas Story"
1996	Friends	Little Boy	Episode: "The One After the Superbowl (Part one)"
1997	The Weird Al Show	Himself	Episode: "Because I Said So"
1997–1999	Smart Guy	T.J. Henderson	Main role; 51 episodes
2001–2005	Express Yourself	Himself	Interstitial series
2002–2007	Kim Possible	Wade Load (voice)	Main role; 86 episodes
2005	Lilo & Stitch: The Series	Wade Load (voice)	Episode: "Rufus"
2006	The Suite Life of Zack & Cody	Brandon	Episode: "Scary Movie"
2007	Desperate Housewives	Matt	Episode: "Smiles of a Summer Night"
2012–2017	Baby Daddy	Tucker Dobbs	Main role; 100 episodes
2015	The Real	Himself	Guest Co-Host
2021	Family Reunion	Mr. Dean	Episode: "Remember When Shaka Did the Robot?"
2021	Black Don't Crack	Khalil Grant	Main role; Unsold pilot
2022	How We Roll	Lew	Recurring role
2023	The Muppets Mayhem	Gary "Moog" Moogowski	Main role

=== Video games ===
Year	Title	Role	Notes
2006	Kim Possible: Legend of the Monkey's Eye	Wade Load	
2006	Kim Possible: Whats the Switch?	Wade Load	

== Awards ==
Awards
Year	Result	Award	Category	Nominated Work
1992	Nominated	Young Artist Awards	Exceptional Performance by a Young Actor Under 10	Full House
1998	Nominated	Young Artist Awards	Best Performance in a TV Comedy Series: Leading Young Performer	Smart Guy
1998	Nominated	YoungStar Awards	Best Performance by a Young Actor in a Comedy TV Series	Smart Guy
1999	Nominated	Image Awards	Outstanding Youth Actor/Actress	Smart Guy
2000	Nominated	Image Awards	Outstanding Youth Actor/Actress	Smart Guy
2001	Nominated	Young Artist Awards	Best Performance in a TV Movie (Comedy): Supporting Young Actor	Seventeen Again
2013	Nominated	Teen Choice Awards	Scene Stealer: Male	Baby Daddy
2014	Nominated	Teen Choice Awards	Scene Stealer: Male	Baby Daddy
