= Lay Your Hands on Me (Boom Boom Satellites song) =

"Lay Your Hands On Me"

Single by Boom Boom Satellites
- Released: June 22, 2016
- Genre: Big beat; electronica; rock
- Length: 6:01
- Label: gr8! Records
- Songwriter(s): Michiyuki Kawashima; Masayuki Nakano

Boom Boom Satellites singles chronology
"A Hundred Suns" (2015)	"Lay Your Hands On Me" (2016)

Anime edition cover

"Lay Your Hands on Me" (stylized as "LAY YOUR HANDS ON ME") is a song and an EP of the same name by Japanese electronica/rock duo Boom Boom Satellites, released on June 22, 2016. The track is used as the opening theme for the anime Kiznaiver. Due to vocalist and guitarist Michiyuki Kawashima's failing health, "Lay Your Hands on Me" serves as Boom Boom Satellites' final record.

== Music video ==
On May 23, 2016, Boom Boom Satellites released a short version of the music video on YouTube.

== Track listing ==
All tracks are written by Boom Boom Satellites

Standard edition
No.	Title	Length
1.	"Lay Your Hands on Me"	6:01
2.	"Stars and Clouds"	5:18
3.	"Flare"	4:35
4.	"Narcosis"	6:47
Total length:		22 min
