= Broken Mirror =

Single by Boom Boom Satellites

from the album Embrace
- Released: June 6, 2012
- Genre: Big beat, electronica, rock
- Length: 6:18
- Label: gr8! Records
- Songwriter(s): Michiyuki Kawashima, Masayuki Nakano

Boom Boom Satellites singles chronology
"Back on My Feet" (2009)	"Broken Mirror" (2012)

Anime edition cover
- The anime edition single cover featuring Mobile Suit Gundam Unicorn episode 5's titular "Black Unicorn", the RX-0 Unicorn Gundam 02 "Banshee"

"Broken Mirror" (stylized as "BROKEN MIRROR") is a song by Japanese electronica/rock duo Boom Boom Satellites, scheduled for release on June 6, 2012. It serves as the theme song for the fifth episode of the Mobile Suit Gundam Unicorn OVA series. It is the first English-language song used in the series, after previous episodes featured songs by Chiaki Kuriyama, Kylee, CHEMISTRY, and earthmind.

The single was released in two editions: a standard edition with only the title track and a remix of the track, and a special pressing that includes the version of the song as used in Gundam Unicorn. The standard edition will also include special CD-ROM data that consists of the different parts of the song to be used in remixing. In cooperation with Nico Nico Douga, the band will be hosting a remix contest using this content, and the winning remix will be featured on the first ever Boom Boom Satellites remix album Remixed.

== Music video ==
On April 24, 2012, Boom Boom Satellites hosted a Ustream show where they filmed parts of the music video live. They made use of a "Scanning Control Live Projection" system to provide the visuals for the video. They collaborated with EDP Graphic Works for the visual effects, wardrobe stylist Shinichi Miter, writer Kensaku Kakimoto, and it was produced by Rock'n'Roll Japan. The video was released on May 23, 2012.

== Track listing ==
All tracks are written by Boom Boom Satellites

Standard edition
No.	Title	Length
1.	"Broken Mirror"	6:18
2.	"Broken Mirror" (The Lowbrows Remix)	5:20
Total length:		11:42

Anime edition
No.	Title	Length
1.	"Broken Mirror"	6:18
2.	"Broken Mirror" (Movie Edit)	5:10
3.	"Broken Mirror" (The Lowbrows Remix)	5:20
Total length:		16:55
