= Ninja Slayer =

Japanese science fiction novel series

- Cover of the eleventh novel in the series

ニンジャスレイヤー (Ninja Sureiyā)
- Novel series
- Written by: Bradley Bond, Philip Ninj@ Morzez
- Illustrated by: Warainaku
- Published by: Enterbrain
- Original run: September 29, 2012 – present
- Volumes: 20
- Manga
- Written by: Bradley Bond, Philip Ninj@ Morzez, Yoshiaki Tabata
- Illustrated by: Yūki Yogo
- Published by: Kadokawa Shoten
- English publisher: NA: Vertical
- Magazine: Comp Ace
- Original run: June 27, 2013 – December 8, 2017
- Volumes: 14
- Manga

Ninja Slayer: Glamorous Killers
- Written by: Bradley Bond, Philip Ninj@ Morzez
- Illustrated by: Ageha Saotome
- Published by: Enterbrain
- Magazine: B's-Log Comic
- Original run: July 2, 2013 – 2015
- Volumes: 3
- Manga

Ninja Slayer Kills
- Written by: Bradley Bond, Philip Ninj@ Morzez
- Illustrated by: Kōtarō Sekine
- Published by: Kodansha
- English publisher: NA: Kodansha USA
- Magazine: Suiyōbi no Sirius
- Original run: January 22, 2014 – December 28, 2016
- Volumes: 4
- Original net animation

Ninja Slayer From Animation
- Directed by: Akira Amemiya
- Written by: Akira Amemiya; Yu Sato
- Music by: Kenji Fujisawa; Hiroshi Motofuji
- Studio: Trigger
- Licensed by: AUS: Madman Entertainment; NA: Funimation
- Released: April 16, 2015 – October 8, 2015
- Runtime: 15 minutes (per episode)
- Episodes: 26
- Manga

Ninja Slayer: Kyoto Hell On Earth
- Written by: Bradley Bond, Philip Ninj@ Morzez, Yoshiaki Tabata
- Illustrated by: Yūki Yogo
- Published by: Kadokawa Shoten
- Magazine: Comp Ace
- Original run: April 19, 2018 – present
- icon

Ninja Slayer (Japanese: ニンジャスレイヤー, Hepburn: Ninja Sureiyā) is a novel series styled as a work by American authors Bradley Bond and Philip "Ninj@" Morzez, who have authorized Honda Yu and Sugi Leika to translate it into Japanese. Enterbrain published the first Japanese version in September 2012, with illustrations by Warainaku. Sixteen novels have been released as of June 2016. It has received three manga adaptations. An ONA adaptation was produced by Trigger and directed by Akira Amemiya which aired from April to October 2015.

== Authorship ==
While the creators publicly attribute the work to the two American authors, reporters consider it to be a Japanese work pretending to be a translation.

== Plot ==
The story takes place in the cyberpunk metropolis of Neo-Saitama. After his wife and child are killed in a ninja turf war, salaryman Kenji Fujikido gets possessed by a mysterious ninja soul known as Naraku Ninja. As Naraku's craving for massacring the evil ninja overlaps with Fujikido's lust for revenge, together they bring Ninja Slayer – a terrifying ninja-killing grim reaper – into existence. The more their mental resonance and physical symbiosis deepens, the more powerful Ninja Slayer becomes. If Fujikido completely surrenders himself to Naraku, he will be unstoppable, at the cost of Naraku being able to massacre freely without restraint.

== Characters ==
Ninja Slayer (ニンジャスレイヤー, Ninja Sureiyā) / Fujikido Kenji (フジキド・ケンジ, Fujikido Kenji)
Voiced by: Toshiyuki Morikawa (Japanese); Christopher R. Sabat (English)
A man who becomes a ninja in order to eliminates other ninjas and get revenge on the ones that got his family killed, the Soukai Syndicate. His ninja soul is the Naraku Ninja.
Darkninja (ダークニンジャ, Dākuninja) / Fujio Katakura (フジオ・カタクラ)
Voiced by: Shō Hayami (Japanese); Chris Ryan (English)
A high ranking ninja who serves Khan and the Soukai Syndicate. He is also responsible for killing Kenji's wife and child.
Nancy Lee (ナンシー・リー, Nanshī Rī)
Voiced by: Chiwa Saitō (Japanese); Trina Nishimura (English)
A journalist who seeks the truth and follows Ninja Slayer around. She has special hacking skills and can directly connect herself to cyberspace.
Yamoto Koki (ヤモト・コキ)
Voiced by: Sora Amamiya (Japanese); Monica Rial (English)
A teenage girl who is also a ninja and later becomes a comrade of Ninja Slayer. Her ninja soul is the Shi Ninja.
Dragon Yukano (ドラゴン・ユカノ, Doragon Yukano) / Amnesia (アムニジア, Amunijia)
Voiced by: Risa Taneda (Japanese); Bryn Apprill (English)
An experienced kunoichi and Gendoso's granddaughter who helps out Ninja Slayer from time to time. Unlike the Ninja Slayer and Yamoto, she is an actual ninja.
Dragon Gendoso (ドラゴン・ゲンドーソー, Doragon Gendōsō)
Voiced by: Yōsuke Akimoto (Japanese); Greg Dulcie (English)
The head of the Dragon Dojo and the last real ninja in Japan. He is also Ninja Slayer's master.
Laomoto Khan (ラオモト・カン, Raomoto Kan)
Voiced by: Masane Tsukayama (Japanese); Bill Jenkins (English)
The leader of the Soukai Syndicate, he possesses seven different Ninja Souls collectively known as Demolition Ninja.
Clone Yakuza (クローンヤクザ, Kurōnyakuza)
Voiced by: Tesshō Genda (Japanese); Tyler Walker (English)
Silver Karasu (シルバーカラス, Shirubākarasu) / Kagi Tanaka (カギ・タナカ, Kagi Tanaka)
Voiced by: Keiji Fujiwara (Japanese); Brandon Potter (English)
A ninja with cancer on the verge of dying. He's hired to kill criminals and ninjas to test new weapons. He is Yamoto's sensei and is an iaido master.

== Media ==
=== Novels ===
Ninja Slayer was originally posted piece by piece on Twitter by Japanese "translators" Honda Yu and Sugi Leika, allegedly adapting the story from American authors "Bradley Bond and Philip "Ninj@" Morzez". After the series grew in popularity, Enterbrain published the first Japanese-translated volume in print, Ninja Slayer: Neo-Saitama in Flames, in September 2012. There appears to be no evidence of an original copy of Ninja Slayer, and the original creators "Bradley Bond and Philip Ninj@ Morzez" appear to be fictional authors created to produce the illusion of an elaborate backstory, and have no record of an accurate bio.

No.	Title	Release date	ISBN
1	Neo-Saitama in Flames 1 (ネオサイタマ炎上1 Neo Saitama Enjō 1)	September 29, 2012	978-4-04-728331-2
2	Neo-Saitama in Flames 2 (ネオサイタマ炎上2 Neo Saitama Enjō 2)	November 30, 2012	978-4-04-120942-4
3	Neo-Saitama in Flames 3 (ネオサイタマ炎上3 Neo Saitama Enjō 3)	January 31, 2013	978-4-04-728481-4
4	Neo-Saitama in Flames 4 (ネオサイタマ炎上4 Neo Saitama Enjō 4)	March 30, 2013	978-4-04-728858-4
5	Kyoto: Hell on Earth 1, Shadow of Zaibatsu (ザイバツ強襲!(キョート殺伐都市 # 1) Zaibatsu Kyōshū! (Kyōto Satsubatsu Toshi # 1))	June 29, 2013	978-4-04-728946-8
6	Kyoto: Hell on Earth 2, Ninja and Geisha (ゲイシャ危機一髪!(キョート殺伐都市 # 2) Geisha Kiki Ipatsu! (Kyōto Satsubatsu Toshi # 2))	August 31, 2013	978-4-04-729120-1
7	Kyoto: Hell on Earth 3, Three Dirty Ninja-Bond (荒野の三忍(キョート殺伐都市 # 3) Kōya no Sannin (Kyōto Satsubatsu Toshi # 3))	August 31, 2013	978-4-04-729120-1
8	Kyoto: Hell on Earth 4, Nunchaku Destruction (聖なるヌンチャク(キョート殺伐都市 # 4) Seinaru Nunchaku (Kyōto Satsubatsu Toshi # 4))	December 28, 2013	978-4-04-729353-3
9	Kyoto: Hell on Earth 5, Reboot, Raven (ピストルカラテ決死拳(キョート殺伐都市 # 5) Pisutiru Karate Kesshi Ken (Kyōto Satsubatsu Toshi # 5))	April 12, 2014	978-4-04-729362-5
10	Kyoto: Hell on Earth 6, Maguro and Dragon (マグロ・アンド・ドラゴン(キョート殺伐都市 # 6) Maguro Ando Doragon (Kyōto Satsubatsu Toshi # 6))	July 9, 2014	978-4-04-729755-5
11	Kyoto: Hell on Earth 7, Kyoto: Hell on Earth (Part 1) (キョート・ヘル・オン・アース【上】(キョート殺伐都市 # 7) Kyōto Heru On Āsu [Ue] (Kyōto Satsubatsu Toshi # 7))	October 14, 2014	978-4-04-729932-0
12	Kyoto: Hell on Earth 8, Kyoto: Hell on Earth (Part 2) (キョート・ヘル・オン・アース【下】(キョート殺伐都市 # 8) Kyōto Heru On Āsu [Shita] (Kyōto Satsubatsu Toshi # 8))	January 24, 2015	978-4-04-730189-4
13	Ninja Slayer Never Dies 1, Secret Society Amakudari Sect (秘密結社アマクダリ・セクト (不滅のニンジャソウル # 1) Himitsu Kessha Amakudari Sekuto (Fumetsu no Ninja Sōru # 1))	April 16, 2015	978-4-04-730418-5
14	Ninja Slayer Never Dies 2, Who Killed Ninja Slayer? (死神の帰還 (不滅のニンジャソウル # 2) Shinigami no Kikan (Fumetsu no Ninja Sōru # 2))	July 25, 2015	978-4-04-730606-6
15	Ninja Slayer Never Dies 3, Killing Field Sappukei (キリング・フィールド・サップーケイ (不滅のニンジャソウル # 3) Kiringu Fīrudo Sappūkei (Fumetsu no Ninja Sōru# 3))	November 30, 2015	978-4-04-730790-2
16	Ninja Slayer Never Dies 4, Thunnus Thunderbolt (ケオスの狂騒曲 Keosu no Kyōsō Kyoku)	March 31, 2016	978-4-04-734021-3
17	Ninja Slayer Never Dies 5, Dark Side of the Moon (開戦前夜ネオサイタマ Kaisen zen'ya neosaitama)	May 30, 2016	978-4-04-734176-0
18	Ninja Slayer Never Dies 6, Reforging the Hatred (リフォージング・ザ・ヘイトレッド Rifōjingu za heitoreddo)	November 30, 2016	978-4-04-734409-9
19	Ninja Slayer Never Dies 7, The Longest Day of the Amakudari (Vol. 1) (ロンゲスト・デイ・オブ・アマクダリ (上) Rongesuto Dei Obu amakudari (ue))	June 30, 2017	978-4-04-734712-0
20	Ninja Slayer Never Dies 8, The Longest Day of the Amakudari (Vol. 2) (ロンゲスト・デイ・オブ・アマクダリ (下) Rongesuto Dei Obu amakudari (shita))	December 28, 2017	978-4-04-734952-0

=== Manga ===
A manga adaptation with art by Yūki Yogo and scripted by Yoshiaki Tabata is serialized in Kadokawa Shoten's Comp Ace since June 27, 2013. It has been collected in currently five tankōbon volumes. Another manga adaptation titled Ninja Slayer: Glamorous Killers (ニンジャスレイヤー グラマラス・キラーズ, Ninja Sureiyā: Guramarasu Kirāzu) with art by Ageha Saotome also began serialization from July 1, 2013, in Enterbrain's shōjo manga magazine B's-Log Comic. It has also been collected into three tankōbon volumes. A third adaptation titled Ninja Slayer Kills (ニンジャスレイヤー 殺(キルズ), Ninja Sureiyā Satsu (Kiruzu)) is serialized in Kodansha's Suiyoubi no Sirius.

==== Volume list ====
Ninja Slayer

No.	Original release date	Original ISBN	English release date	English ISBN
1	December 10, 2013	978-4041209424	October 20, 2015	9781941220931
2	May 10, 2014	9784041211144	December 15, 2015	9781941220948
3	November 10, 2014	9784041016749	February 23, 2016	9781941220955
4	April 10, 2015	9784041029121	April 19, 2016	9781942993254
5	July 10, 2015	9784041034002	June 21, 2016	9781942993551
6	December 10, 2015	9784041034026	October 11, 2016	9781942993865
7	April 9, 2016	9784041040621	January 17, 2017	9781945054044
8	July 9, 2016	9784041044209	May 30, 2017	9781945054150
9	September 26, 2016	9784041048184	—	—
10	December 10, 2016	9784041050293	—	—
11	December 10, 2016	9784041050316	—	—

=== Anime ===
In April 2014, Enterbrain announced that an anime adaptation of the novel was in production, later revealing that it was being produced by Trigger. More details were announced in Los Angeles, CA at Anime Expo 2014. The anime, titled Ninja Slayer From Animation, is directed by Akira Amamiya, and the main theme is "Back In Black" performed by electronic band Boom Boom Satellites. The anime premiered on Niconico on April 16, 2015, and a television broadcast started airing in April 2016. The series is licensed in North America by Funimation, who is simulcasting the series with subtitles and began streaming a dubbed version from May 21, 2015. Anime Limited announced that they had acquired the series in the United Kingdom and Ireland, however, later announced that they had cancelled the release.

==== Episode list ====
No.	Title	Original release date
1	"Born In Red Black" (ボーン・イン・レッド・ブラック)	April 16, 2015
A salaryman is given a second chance by becoming Ninja Slayer to get revenge for his family.
2	"Machine of Vengeance" (マシン・オブ・ヴェンジェンス)	April 23, 2015
Ninja Slayer faces some of the elite Soukai ninjas.
3	"Last Girl Standing, Part 1" (ラスト・ガール・スタンディングPART1)	April 30, 2015
Yamoto enjoys her school life with friends until a transfer student she knows from the past shows up.
4	"Last Girl Standing, Part 2" (ラスト・ガール・スタンディングPART2)	May 7, 2015
Yamoto faces Suicide's boss, Sonic Boom and gets help from an unexpected person.
5	"Rage Against Tofu" (レイジ・アゲンスト・トーフ)	May 14, 2015
6	"Surprised Dojo" (サプライズド・ドージョー)	May 21, 2015
Ninja Slayer tries to prevent Soukai ninjas from getting to the Dragon Dojo.
7	"Bane of Serpent" (ベイン・オブ・サーペント)	May 28, 2015
Nancy Lee follows a lead that puts her in big trouble.
8	"Apocalypse Inside Tainted Soil" (アポカリプス・インサイド・テインティッド・ソイル)	June 4, 2015
Ninja Slayer and Nancy sneak into a secret clone manufacturing plant to gather intel that would be of use to them. However, they aren't the only ones snooping around.
9	"One Minute Before the Tanuki, Part 1" (ワン・ミニット・ビフォア・ザ・タヌキ PART 1)	June 11, 2015
Nancy and Ninja Slayer sneak into a Yoroshisan facility for intel, but they are tailed by Survival Dojo and a ninja hacker called Daedalus.
10	"One Minute Before the Tanuki, Part 2" (ワン・ミニット・ビフォア・ザ・タヌキ PART 2)	June 18, 2015
Ninja Slayer fights the Survival Dojo ninjas so that Nancy can gather the intel, who in turn also has a problem of her own.
11	"Menace of Darkninja" (メナス・オブ・ダークニンジャ)	June 25, 2015
Ninja Slayer heads to one of Dragon Dojo's safe houses to cure his master's disease. However, he is unaware that he is being followed by a Soukai ninja that has a deep connection to him.
12	"Day of the Lobster" (デイ・オブ・ザ・ロブスター)	July 2, 2015
Ninja Slayer rescues Nancy from Lobster, only to rescue her again when Lobster is mysteriously resurrected.
13	"Swan Song Sung by a Faded Crow, Part 1" (スワン・ソング・サング・バイ・ア・フェイデッド・クロウ PART 1)	July 9, 2015
Yamoto meets Kagi Tanaka AKA Silver Karasu, who eventually becomes her future sensei. However, Silver Karasu is also on the verge of death.
14	"Swan Song Sung by a Faded Crow, Part 2" (スワン・ソング・サング・バイ・ア・フェイデッド・クロウ PART 2)	July 16, 2015
Yamoto shows her improvement with iaido while Kagi makes his last decision before perishing.
15	"Sushi Night at the Barricade" (スシ・ナイト・アット・ザ・バリケード)	July 23, 2015
A riot breaks out between residence resistance and Omura Industry.
16	"At the Treasonersville" (アット・ザ・トリーズナーズヴィル)	July 30, 2015
Ninja Slayer stays and observes the resistance that Yukano (now going by Amnesia) has joined after having lost her memories.
17	"Treasure Every Meeting" (トレジャー・エヴリー・ミーティング)	August 6, 2015
Along her travels, Yamoto meets Genocide, a runaway zombie ninja.
18	"Ever Felt Cheated?" (エヴァー・フェルト・チーティド)	August 13, 2015
19	"Stranger Stranger Than Fiction, Part 1" (ストレンジャー・ストレンジャー・ザン・フィクション PART 1)	August 20, 2015
Ninja Slayer planned an assassination of Laomoto, only to find out that he knew all about it.
20	"Stranger Stranger Than Fiction, Part 2" (ストレンジャー・ストレンジャー・ザン・フィクション PART 2)	August 27, 2015
Ninja Slayer gives chase to rescue Nancy from former Soukai Ninjas.
21	"Neo-Saitama in Flames, Part 1: Like a Bloodarrow Straight" (ネオ = サイタマ・イン・フレイム PART 1：ライク・ア・ブラッドアロー・ストレート)	September 3, 2015
After recovering, Ninja Slayer continues searching for Nancy while running into familiar faces.
22	"Neo-Saitama in Flames, Part 2: Darkninja Returns" (ネオ = サイタマ・イン・フレイム PART 2：ダークニンジャ・リターンズ)	September 10, 2015
Ninja Slayer has a rematch with Darkninja.
23	"Neo-Saitama in Flames, Part 3: And You Will Know Him by the Trail of Ninja" (ネオ = サイタマ・イン・フレイム PART 3：アンド・ユー・ウィル・ノウ・ヒム・バイ・ザ・トレイル・オブ・ニンジャ)	September 17, 2015
Ninja Slayer, with the help of Nancy, fights though the Soukai's Six Gate Ninjas to get to Laomoto.
24	"Neo-Saitama in Flames, Part 4: Dark Dusk, Darker Dawn: Part 1" (ネオ = サイタマ・イン・フレイム PART 4：ダークダスク・ダーカードーン part1)	September 24, 2015
Ninja Slayer begins his fight with the Soukai Syndicate leader, Laomoto.
25	"The Best of Ninja Slayer from Animation" (ニンジャスレイヤー 傑作選)	October 1, 2015
A compilation of shorts that weren't seen during the season.
26	"Neo-Saitama in Flames, Part 5: Dark Dusk, Darker Dawn: Part 2" (ネオ = サイタマ・イン・フレイム PART 5：ダークダスク・ダーカードーン part2)	October 8, 2015
The conclusion of Ninja Slayer's battle with Laomoto Khan.
