= Acidman =

Japanese rock band

- Origin: Saitama Japan
- Genres: Indie rock Alternative rock Punk rock Experimental Rock
- Years active: 1997–present
- Labels: Nomadic Records, Virgin Records Japan/Universal Music Japan
- Members: Ohki Nobuo; Sato Masatoshi; Urayama Ichigo
- Website: acidman.jp

Acidman (often stylized as ACIDMAN) is a Japanese rock group. The band was formed in 1997 with four members, Shiibashi Takeshi, Urayama Ichigo, Satou Masatoshi, and Ohki Nobuo. They created two demo tapes together in 1998, but former vocalist Shiibashi Takeshi left in 1999. Ohki Nobuo took his place and became the leader of the group. They continued playing live concerts, and were eventually signed to Toshiba-EMI. The band is often categorized as punk music or alternative rock but their musical style is broader and is said to blend various kinds of individual styles.

Ohki Nobuo paints many of the band's album covers.

== Discography ==
=== Singles ===
| Singles | Release date | Tracklist/Notes |
|---|---|---|
| 'Sekitou' (赤橙) | 24 November 2000 | 1. To Live; 2. Sekitou (赤橙) - Meaning "Red Orange"; 3. Kouen (公園) - Meaning "The Park"; 4. Baiyo Smash Party (培養スマッシュパーティー) - Meaning "Culture Smash Party" |
| 'Zouka ga Warau' (造花が笑う) | 31 July 2002 | 1. Zouka ga Warau (造花が笑う) - Meaning "The Artificial Flower Laughs" |
| 'Allegro' (アレグロ) | 4 September 2002 | 1. Allegro (アレグロ) |
| 'Sekitou' (赤橙) | 9 October 2002 | 1. Sekitou (赤橙) |
| 'Slow View' | 12 March 2003 | 1. Hikou (飛光) - Meaning "Flying Light"; 2. Slow View; 3. Shizuka naru Uso to Chouwa (静かなる嘘と調和) - Meaning "Quiet Lie and Harmony" |
| 'Repeat' (リピート) | 9 July 2003 | 1. Nami, Shiroku (波、白く) - Meaning "The Waves, White..."; 2. Repeat (リピート) |
| 'Suisha' (水写) | 3 March 2004 | 1. Suisha (水写) - Meaning "Reflection in the Water"; 2. Sai (彩-Sai- (inst ver.)) - Meaning "Colors (instrumental version)" 3. Kaze, Sayuru (風、冴ゆる) - Meaning "The Wind, Serene..." |
| 'Equal e.p.' | 25 August 2004 | 1. Equal (イコール); 2. Coda (コーダ); 3. talk (inst.) |
| 'Aru shoumei' (ある証明) | 18 May 2005 | 1. Aru shoumei (ある証明) - Meaning "The Proof That's There"; 2. Human Traffic; 3. SOL (inst.) |
| 'Kisetsu no Tou' (季節の灯) | 19 October 2005 | 1. Kisetsu no Tou (季節の灯) - Meaning "Lamplight of the Seasons"; 2. Spaced Out (second line) |
| 'World Symphony' | 9 November 2005 | 1. World Symphony; 2. Turn Around (second line) |
| 'Slow Rain' (スロウレイン) | 6 September 2006 | 1. Slow Rain (スロウレイン); 2. Isotope (アイソトープ) (second line); 3. Walking Dada (inst.) |
| 'Prism no Yoru' (プリズムの夜) | 15 November 2006 | 1. Prism no Yoru (プリズムの夜) - Meaning "The Prism-like Night"; 2. Dawn Chorus (inst.); 3. Simple Story (シンプルストーリー) (second line) |
| 'Remind' | 18 July 2007 | 1. Remind; 2. Sekishoku Gunzou (赤色群像) (inst.) |
| 'Unfold' | 27 November 2007 | 1. Unfold; 2. Concord Vega (ベガの呼応) (inst.) |
| 'Shikijitsu' | 20 February 2008 | 1. Shikijitsu (式日) - Meaning "Judgment Day"; 2. Evergreen (inst.) |
| 'I Stand Free' | 12 November 2008 | 1. I Stand Free; 2. O (second line) |
| 'Carve with the Sense' | 25 February 2009 | 1. Carve with the Sense; 2. Freak Out (second line) |
| 'Dear Freedom' | 21 July 2010 | 1. Dear Freedom; 2. 彩-Sai-(前編); 3. Digest from 8th album (2010 winter) |
| 'Alma' | 22 September 2010 | 1. Alma; 2. 彩-Sai-(後編); 3. Digest from 8th album (2010 winter); 4. No.2 |
| 'Alchemist' (アルケミスト) | 19 September 2012 | 1. Alchemist (アルケミスト); 2. Equal (second line); 3. Your Song (acoustic) |
| 'Shinsekai' (新世界) | 19 December 2012 | 1. Shinsekai (新世界) - Meaning "New World"; 2. swayed (second line); 3. Under the Rain (acoustic) |
| 'Everlight' | 16 April 2014 | 1. Everlight; 2. ±0 (second line); 3. I Stand Free (acoustic); 4. ±0 (remastering); 5. I Stand Free (remastering) |
| 'Stay in my Hand' | 16 July 2014 | 1. Stay in my Hand; 2. Slow Rain (スロウレイン) (second line); 3. HUM (second line); 4. Slow Rain (スロウレイン) (remastering); 5. HUM (remastering) |
| 'Sekai ga Owaru Yoru' (世界が終わる夜) | 24 September 2014 | 1. Sekai ga Owaru Yoru (世界が終わる夜); 2. type-A (Second line); 3. Nami, Shiroku (波、白く) (Acoustic); 4. type-A (Remastering); 5. Nami, Shiroku (波、白く) (Remastering) |
| 'Saigo no Hoshi' (最後の星) | 26 October 2016 | 1. Saigo no Hoshi (最後の星); 2. Sore; 3. Alfheim -instrumental- (アルフヘイム -instrumental-) |
| 'Ai wo Ryote ni' (愛を両手に) | 8 February 2017 | 1. Ai wo Ryote ni (愛を両手に); 2. snow light 3. Mizu no Yoru ni (水の夜に); 4. Live Track From 2014.10.23 Zepp Tokyo |
| 'Millennium' (ミレニアム) | 26 July 2017 | 1. Millennium (ミレニアム); 2. Seesaw; 3. Ao no Hatsumei −instrumental− (青の発明 −instrumental−); 4. Live Track From 20141023 Zepp Tokyo |
| 'Haiiro no Machi' (灰色の街) | 3 June 2020 | 1. Haiiro no Machi (灰色の街); This CD also contains live recordings of "〜ACIDMAN LIVE TOUR “創、再現” in 新木場STUDIO COAST〜(at 12 December 2019)". |
| 'Shining' (輝けるもの) | 17 January 2024 | 1. Shining (輝けるもの); 2. Shining (輝けるもの)(Instrumental); 3. Rebirth (Live Track from 「This is ACIDMAN 2023 at Zepp Haneda (30 October 2023); 4. ALMA (Live Track from 「This is ACIDMAN 2023 at Zepp Haneda (30 October 2023) |
| 'sonet' | 8 January 2025 | 1. sonet 2. sonet (Instrumental); 3. Shining (輝けるもの) (Live Track); 4. Ginga no Machi (Live Track); 5. Wonderland (Live Track); Live Track is from ACIDMAN LIVE TOUR 「Golden Setlist」 at LINE CUBE SHIBUYA (11 August 2024) |

=== Miniature albums ===
| Album | Release date | Songs |
|---|---|---|
| 'Sanka Zora' (酸化空) | 6 March 2002 | 1. 8 to 1; 2. Ima, Toumei ka (今、透明か) Meaning "Is It Transparent Now?"; 3. Silence; 4. Sanka Zora (酸化空) Meaning "Oxidized Sky"; 5. Free White |

=== Albums ===
| Album name | Release date | Track listing |
|---|---|---|
| Sou (創) | 30 October 2002 | 1. 8 to 1 Completed; 2. Zouka ga Warau; 3. Allegro; 4. Sekitou; 5. Background; 6. At; 7. Spaced Out; 8. Kouro; 9. Simple Story; 10. Silence; 11. Yureru Kyutai; 12. Your Song |
| Loop | 6 August 2003 | 1. Type-A; 2. Nami, Shiroku; 3. Isotope; 4. Hikou; 5. Slow View; 6. Repeat; 7. 16185-O; 8. O 9. Swayed; 10. Dried Out; 11. Ima, Toumei ka 12. Turn Around |
| Equal | 15 September 2004 | 1. 0=All; 2. Freak Out; 3. Furu Aki; 4. Equal; 5. Suisya; 6. Sai Zenpen (inst.); 7. Sai Kouhen; 8. Akatsuki o Nokoshite; 9. Colors of the Wind (Cover); 10. migration 10^{64}; 11. cps (inst.); 12. Mawaru, Meguru, Sono Kaku he |
| And World | 7 December 2005 | 1. Introduction; 2. World Symphony; 3. Id; 4. River; 5. Kisetsu no Tou; 6. SOL (inst.); 7. Ginga no Machi; 8. Natsu no Yoin; 9. Platanus; 10. Water Room (inst.); 11. Stay on land 12. Aru Shoumei; 13. and world |
| Green Chord | 7 February 2007 | 1. Green Chord (Introduction); 2. Returning; 3. Ride the Wave; 4. Slow Rain; 5. Real Distance; 6. So Far; 7. Prism no Yoru; 8. AM2:00 (inst.); 9. Dawn Chorus (inst.) |
| Life | 16 April 2008 | 1. Life (The Beginning); 2. Remind; 3. Stromatolite; 4. Free Star; 5. Shikijitsu; 6. Walk; 7. Room NO.138 (inst.); 8. Machi No Rinkaku; 9. Old Sunset; 10. Kin'iro No Capella; 11. Unfold; 12. To the World's End; 13. Life (The Ending) |
| A Beautiful Greed | 29 July 2009 | 1. A Beautiful Greed (Introduction); 2. ±0; 3. Carve with the Sense; 4. Who Are You?; 5. Under the Rain; 6. Fantasia; 7. Hoshi no Hitohira; 8. Hum; 9. Ucess (inst.); 10. Bright & Right; 11. I Stand Free; 12. Over |
| Alma | 1 December 2010 | 1. Saigo no Kuni (Introduction); 2. Kaze ga Fuku Toki; 3. One Day; 4. Dear Freedom; 5. Noël; 6. Alma; 7. Masshiro na Yoru (inst.); 8. Legato no Mori; 9. Final Dance Scene; 10. 2145 Nen; 11. Wonderland |
| Shinsekai | 27 February 2013 | 1. gen to (intro); 2. SUSY; 3. Shinsekai; 4. NO.6; 5. Last Chord; 6. Alchemist; 7. Kaze Oi Hito (zenpen); 8. Kaze Oi Hito (kouhen); 9. Further (Yoru ni Naru Mae ni); 10. Kimi no Shoudai; 11. Catastrophe; 12. Hakkou (白光); 13. to gen (outro) |
| Yū to Mu | 19 November 2014 | 1. Yū to Mu; 2. Eien no Soko; 3. EVERLIGHT; 4. Stay in my hand 5. star rain 6. EDEN; 7. Sekai ga Owaru Yoru; 8. Hallelujah; 9. en (instrumental); 10. your soul 11. Tasogare no Machi; 12. Saigo no Keshiki |
| Lambda | 13 December 2017 | 1. Phi (Introduction); 2. Shiroi Bunmei; 3. Millennium; 4. Prana; 5. Saigo no Hoshi; 6. Utopia; 7. Mizu no Yoru ni (album version); 8. Lambda-CDM (instrumental); 9. Kuuhaku no Tori; 10. MEMORIES; 11. Hikari ni Naru Made; 12. Ai wo Ryoute ni |
| Innocence | 27 October 2021 | 1. introduction 2. Visitor; 3. Yuganda Hikari; 4. Rebirth; 5. Haiiro no Machi; 6. Link (instrumental); 7. ALE; 8. Subarashiki Sekai; 9. Yoru no Tame ni 10. innocence 11. Fanfare |
| Optics (光学) | 29 October 2025 | 1. Optics (introduction); 2. Astrocytes (アストロサイト); 3. Go Away; 4. Shining (輝けるもの); 5. sonet 6. Black & White (白と黒); 7. feel every love 8. 1/f (Interlude); 9. Blue Wind (青い風); 10. Dragon (龍); 11. Fluorescence (蛍光); 12. Night of Light (光の夜); 13. All things (あらゆるもの) |

=== Best albums ===
| Album name | Release date |
|---|---|
| Second line & Acoustic collection: Second line means re-arranged and re-recorded tracks. | 28 September 2011 |
| ACIDMAN THE BEST | 8 February 2012 |
| THIS IS INSTRUMENTAL | 8 February 2012 |
| Second line & Acoustic collection II | 18 November 2015 |
| ACIDMAN 20th Anniversary Fans' Best Selection Album "Your Song" | 26 October 2016 |

=== Tribute albums ===
| Album name | Release date |
|---|---|
| ACIDMAN Tribute Works | 29 October 2025 |

=== DVD ===
==== Scene of Series ====
| DVD | Release date | Tracklist |
|---|---|---|
| Scene of Sou (創) | 12 March 2003 | 1. Opening (オープニング); 2. Ima, Toumei ka (今、透明か); 3. Zouka ga Warau (造花が笑う); 4. Allegro (アレグロ); 5. Sekitou (赤橙); Slow View; Bonus Track |
| Scene of Loop | 10 September 2003 | 1. Hikou (飛光); 2. Shizuka naru Uso to Chouwa (静かなる嘘と調和); 3. Slow View; 4. Nami, Shiroku (波、白く); 5. Repeat (リピート); Locus of Loop; Profile |
| Scene of Equal | 14 October 2004 | 1. Equal (イコール); 2. Suisya (水写); 3. Colors of the Wind; [short film]: Sai Zenpen (彩-SAI-(前編)); Cps & Mawaru, Meguru, Sono Kaku e (廻る、巡る、その核へ) |
| Scene of "And World" | 25 January 2006 | 1. Aru Shoumei (ある証明); 2. Sol; 3. Kisetsu no Tou (季節の灯); 4. World symphony 5. Water Room; Making & off shot |
| Scene of "Green Chord" | 5 March 2007 | 1. Slow Rain; 2. Prism no yoru 3. Returning; 4. Walking Dada" (instrumental); Document in 2006" documentary |
| Scene of "LIFE" | 21 May 2008 | 1. Remind; 2. Unfold; 3. Shikijitsu; 4. FREE STAR; 5. THE LIGHT SekishokuGunzo・Vega no Koou・EVERGREEN; Document 2007-2008 |
| Scene of "A beautiful greed" | 2 September 2009 | 1. I stand free 2. CARVE WITH THE SENSE; 3. Under the rain 4. Fantasia; 5. ucess; Document 2008-2009 |
| Scene of "ALMA" | 23 February 2011 | DISC1: Nobuo Ohki's Travelogue Chile & Bolivia; DISC2: 1. DEAR FREEDOM; 2. ALMA; 3. Year 2145; Document 2009-2010 |
| Scene of "New World" | 27 March 2013 | DISC1: Travelogue Kenya & Tanzania; to live(Music Video); DISC2: 1. Alchemist; 2. New World; 3. Kazeoi Bito (first part); scene to ALCHEMIST in Morocco; Document 2012 |

== Music video ==
| Release year | Director | Music title | Note |
|---|---|---|---|
| 2002 | Junji Kojima | Ima, Toumei ka (今、透明か) | |
| 2002 | Junji Kojima | Zouka ga Warau (造花が笑う) | |
| 2002 | Junji Kojima | Allegro (アレグロ) | |
| 2002 | Junji Kojima | Sekitou (赤橙) | |
| 2003年 | Junji Kojima | slow view | |
| 2003年 | Junji Kojima | Hikou (飛光) | |
| 2003年 | Junji Kojima | Shizukanaru Uso to Tyouwa (静かなる嘘と調和) | |
| 2003年 | Junji Kojima | Repeat (リピート) | |
| 2003年 | Junji Kojima | Nami, Shiroku (波、白く) | |
| 2004 | Isao Nishigouri | Suisya (水写) | |
| 2004 | Isao Nishigouri | Sai (彩-sai-) (inst Ver.) | |
| 2004 | Isao Nishigouri | equal (イコール) | |
| 2004 | Isao Nishigouri | Colors of the Wind | |
| 2004 | Isao Nishigouri | SAI(first part) - Mawaru, Meguru, Sonokaku he (彩-SAI-(前編)〜廻る、巡る、その核へ) | short film |
| 2005 | Isao Nishigouri | Aru Shoumei (ある証明) | |
| 2005 | Isao Nishigouri & Takuya Yonezawa | SOL | |
| 2005 | Isao Nishigouri | Kisetsu no Tou (季節の灯) | |
| 2005 | Isao Nishigouri | world symphony | |
| 2005 | Hayato Ando | water room | |
| 2006 | Tetsuro Takeuchi | slow rain (スロウレイン) | |
| 2006 | Isao Nishigouri | Walking Dada | |
| 2006 | Tetsuro Takeuchi | Prism no Yoru (プリズムの夜) | |
| 2007 | Sanae Kikuchi | Returning | |
| 2007 | Daishin Suzuki | REMIND | |
| 2007 | Isao Nishigouri | UNFOLD | |
| 2008 | Daisuke Shimada | Shikijitsu (式日) | |
| 2008 | Nobuo Ohki | THE LIGHT SekishokuGunzo・Vega no Koou・EVERGREEN(THE LIGHT 〜赤色群像・ベガの呼応・EVERGREEN〜) | |
| 2008 | Daisuke Shimada | FREE STAR | |
| 2008 | Tetsuro Takeuchi | I stand free | |
| 2009 | Hideaki Sunaga | CARVE WITH THE SENSE | |
| 2009 | Tetsuro Takeuchi | Under the rain | |
| 2009 | Takayuki Kojima | Fantasia (ファンタジア) | |
| 2009 | Takayuki Kojima | HUM | |
| 2009 | Takayuki Kojima | Ucess | |
| 2010 | Masakazu Fukatsu | DEAR FREEDOM | |
| 2010 | Kensaku Kakimoto | ALMA | Theme Song of APRIM2023 (Asia-Pacific Regional IAU Meeting) |
| 2010 | Kensaku Kakimoto | Year 2145 (2145年) | performer:Robot Nozomi (ロボットのぞみ) |
| 2011 | Kensaku Kakimoto | Sekitou (赤橙)（Acoustic） | |
| 2012 | Kensaku Kakimoto | to live | |
| 2012 | Kensaku Kakimoto | Alchemist (アルケミスト) | |
| 2012 | Kensaku Kakimoto | Shin Sekai(新世界) | |
| 2013 | Kensaku Kakimoto | Kazeoi Bito (first part) (風追い人（前編）) | |
| 2014 | Kensaku Kakimoto | EVERLIGHT | |
| 2014 | Kensaku Kakimoto | Stay in my hand | |
| 2014 | Kensaku Kakimoto | Sekai ga Owaru Yoru (世界が終わる夜) | |
| 2015 | Kensaku Kakimoto | Repeat feat.Atsushi Horie (リピート（Second Line）feat.ホリエアツシ) | |
| 2016 | Kensaku Kakimoto | Saigo no Hoshi (最後の星) | |
| 2017 | Kensaku Kakimoto | Ai wo Ryoute ni (愛を両手に) | Actor:Hirofumi Arai |
| 2017 | Kensaku Kakimoto | Millennium (ミレニアム) | |
| 2020 | Kensaku Kakimoto | Haiiro no Machi (灰色の街) | |
| 2020 | Akihiro Otagiri | Rebirth | |
| 2021 | Akihiro Otagiri | innocence | |
| 2024 | Kensuke Endo | Shining (輝けるもの) | |
| 2024 | Kensaku Kakimoto | Black & White (白と黒) | |
| 2025 | Shigeaki Kubo | sonet | |
| 2025 | | feel every love | Multilingual Lyric Video |
| 2025 | Kensaku Kakimoto | feel every love | |
