= Exposed (Boom Boom Satellites album) =

Studio album by Boom Boom Satellites
- Released: November 21, 2007
- Genre: Electronica, rock, grebo
- Length: 41:44
- Label: Sony Japan

Boom Boom Satellites chronology
On (2006)	Exposed (2007)	19972007 (2010)

Professional ratings
Review scores
Source	Rating
Okayplayer	(81/100)

Exposed is the sixth studio album from Japanese electronica/rock duo Boom Boom Satellites, released on November 21, 2007. "Shut Up and Explode" was the opening theme to the anime Xam'd: Lost Memories (亡念のザムド, Bōnen no Zamudo). It was sold as both a regular CD version and a limited edition containing a DVD with the music video for "Easy Action" and a short documentary documenting the band's 10 years of existence.

== Track listing ==
All tracks are written by Boom Boom Satellites.

No.	Title	Length
1.	"Upside Down"	4:42
2.	"What Goes Round Comes Around"	4:29
3.	"Morning After"	3:06
4.	"Shut Up and Explode"	3:37
5.	"Bring It On Down"	3:01
6.	"Intergalactic"	4:50
7.	"Six Forty Five"	4:19
8.	"Fiends"	3:02
9.	"Entering Orbit"	1:57
10.	"Easy Action"	4:29
11.	"Cluster"	1:00
12.	"Get Back in My House"	3:16
Total length:		41:40

Limited Edition DVD
No.	Title	Length
1.	"Easy Action" (Promotional Video)	4:14
2.	"10 Years History" (Documentary)	27:23
Total length:		31:37
