= Out Loud (Boom Boom Satellites album) =

Studio album by Boom Boom Satellites
- Released: October 31, 1998
- Genre: Big beat
- Length: 52:22
- Label: R&S
- Producer: Boom Boom Satellites

Boom Boom Satellites chronology
Out Loud (1998)	Umbra (2001)

Singles from Out Loud
- 1. "4 a Moment of Silence" Released: 1997; 2. "Dub Me Crazy Ver. 2" Released: 1997; 3. "Joyride" Released: November 1, 1997; 4. "Push Eject" Released: September 19, 1998; 5. "On the Painted Desert" Released: April 1, 1999

Professional ratings
Review scores
Source	Rating
AllMusic	4/5 stars
Melody Maker	3.5/5 stars

Out Loud is the debut studio album by Japanese electronic music duo Boom Boom Satellites, released on R&S Records in 1998. It peaked at number 45 on the UK Independent Albums Chart. Two of the tracks on the album, "Scatterin' Monkey" and "4 a Moment of Silence", can be heard during scenes in the 2008 superhero film The Dark Knight.

== Track listing ==
All tracks are written by Boom Boom Satellites.

EU edition (R&S Records)
No.	Title	Length
1.	"Missing Note"	7:02
2.	"Batter the Jam No. 3"	5:59
3.	"Push Eject"	5:28
4.	"Limbo"	7:30
5.	"Intruder"	1:10
6.	"An Owl"	4:36
7.	"Oneness"	2:36
8.	"Scatterin' Monkey"	5:14
9.	"Def"	4:10
10.	"On the Painted Desert"	8:35
Total length:		52:22

US edition (Epic Records)
No.	Title	Length
1.	"Missing Note"	7:02
2.	"Batter the Jam No. 3"	5:59
3.	"Push Eject"	5:28
4.	"Limbo"	7:30
5.	"Intruder"	1:10
6.	"An Owl"	4:36
7.	"Oneness"	2:36
8.	"Scatterin' Monkey"	5:14
9.	"Def"	4:10
10.	"On the Painted Desert"	8:35
11.	"4 a Moment of Silence"	6:42
12.	"Dub Me Crazy Ver. 02"	6:46
Total length:		66:19

Japanese edition (Sony Music Entertainment Japan)
No.	Title	Length
1.	"Missing Note"	7:02
2.	"Batter the Jam No. 3"	5:59
3.	"Push Eject"	5:28
4.	"Limbo"	7:30
5.	"Intruder"	1:10
6.	"An Owl"	4:36
7.	"Oneness"	2:36
8.	"Scatterin' Monkey"	5:14
9.	"On the Painted Desert"	8:35
Total length:		48:36

== Personnel ==
Credits adapted from liner notes.

- Michiyuki Kawashima – guitar, vocals
- Masayuki Nakano – bass guitar, programming
- Naoki Hirai – additional drums
- Kouji Sekiguchi – turntables (2)
- Issei Igarashi – trumpet (2, 6)
- Nao Takeuchi – saxophone (2, 6), flute (2, 6)
- Asuka Strings – strings (10)
- Asuka Kaneko – string arrangement (10)

== Charts ==
Chart	Peak position
UK Independent Albums (OCC)	45
