= Kick It Out (Boom Boom Satellites song) =

- Digital single cover

Song by Boom Boom Satellites

from the album On
- Released: May 17, 2006 (On release); September 6, 2009 (Collaboration release)
- Length: 4:41 (On); 3:08 (Collaboration)
- Label: Sony Japan/gr8! (JP); Morgan Rich/Universal (US)
- Songwriters: Michiyuki Kawashima, Masayuki Nakano

"Kick It Out" is a song by electronica/rock duo Boom Boom Satellites. The song was originally included as the lead track on their fifth album On and later as the first track on their greatest hits album 19972007. In 2009, the Boom Boom Satellites collaborated with Tahj Mowry and Flo Rida to produce a new version of the song featuring new lyrics sung by Mowry and Flo Rida. Timbaland contacted gr8! records to set up the collaboration. This version of "Kick It Out" is not currently featured on any Boom Boom Satellites albums, but may be in the future. This was later confirmed when it was decided to include the track on the Boom Boom Satellites "remix best" album Remixed.
