= Push Eject =

Song by Boom Boom Satellites

from the album Out Loud
- Released: September 19, 1998
- Genre: Big beat, electronic rock
- Label: R&S Records; Sony Japan; Epic Records (U.S.)
- Songwriter(s): M Nakano, M Kawashima

Boom Boom Satellites singles chronology
"Dub Me Crazy (Ver. 02)" (1998)	"Push Eject" (1998)	"On The Painted Desert - Rampant Colors" (1999)

Music video
- "Push Eject" on YouTube

Professional ratings
Review scores
Source	Rating
AllMusic	3/5 stars

"Push Eject" is a maxi single by the Japanese electronica/rock duo Boom Boom Satellites, combining the title track taken of their first Out Loud album with tracks and remixes previously available on their 7 Ignitions EP in the West.

The song is on OST for the game Gran Turismo 2.

== Versions ==
Numerous releases of the song exist, published variously by Sony Japan, R&S and Epic, including a number of promos. The fullest version is the standard Sony release, whose track listing is noted below. Other versions include, variously, a radio edit, a remix by Howie B, "Limbo" (another track from their Out Loud album) and the standard version of "4 A Moment of Silence" in place of some or all of the tracks listed below. Despite the extended track list of the standard version, it is still classed as a maxi single by retailers although a discography page on the band's official site refers to it as an "album".

In the early 2000s, a version recorded from radio was available on many MP3 file sharing systems such as Napster. The song was mistakenly identified as a track called "Digital" by the American industrial rock band Nine Inch Nails from their album The Fragile.

== Track listing ==
All tracks are written by Boom Boom Satellites Track listing is as per Sony CD version..

Japanese edition (Sony Music Entertainment Japan)
No.	Title	Length
1.	"Push Eject"	5:29
2.	"The Countless Past To Be Hidden"	4:59
3.	"4 A Moment Of Silence (Trapezoid mix)" Remix by Jack Dangers from Meat Beat Manifesto"	6:32
4.	"Dub Me Crazy Ver.02 (Optical Remix)"	7:28
5.	"Dub Me Crazy Ver.02 (Depth Charge Remix)"	5:48
6.	"The Wonderful Wizard of Dub (Dons of Quixote Remix)"	4:56
Total length:		35:15

EU edition (R&S Records)
No.	Title	Length
1.	"Push Eject (Radio Edit)"	3:25
2.	"Push Eject"	5:28
3.	"Limbo"	8:12
Total length:		17:05

== Personnel ==
Credits adapted from liner notes.

- Art Direction, Design, Photography By [Live Photos] – Shinichiro Hirata
- Additional drums and programming - Naoki Hirai
- Guitar, Vocals – Michiyuki Kawashima
- Photography By – Shouji Uchida*
- Programmed By, Bass – Masayuki Nakano
- Written-By, Arranged By, Producer – Boom Boom Satellites
