= Full of Elevating Pleasures =

Studio album by Boom Boom Satellites
- Released: March 24, 2005
- Genre: Grebo, electronica, big beat
- Label: Sony Japan

Boom Boom Satellites chronology
Photon (2003)	Full of Elevating Pleasures (2005)	On (2006)

Full of Elevating Pleasures is the fourth studio album by the Japanese electronica/rock band, Boom Boom Satellites. It was released on March 24, 2005. Two of the tracks on the album, "Dive for You" and "Anthem", were featured on the soundtrack for the 2004 CGI film Appleseed.

On the Oricon ranking, the album reached a peak rank of 20 and charted for 9 weeks.

== Track listing ==
All tracks are written by Boom Boom Satellites.

No.	Title	Length
1.	"Rise and Fall"	4:34
2.	"Let It All Come Down"	4:44
3.	"Moment I Count"	5:02
4.	"Ride On"	4:41
5.	"Spine"	4:33
6.	"Route for Exile"	6:05
7.	"Back in the Night"	4:30
8.	"Propeller"	2:04
9.	"Dive for You"	4:14
10.	"Anthem (Reprise)"	5:15
11.	"Echo Tail"	4:06
12.	"Stride"	5:15
Total length:		55:03

== Sources ==
- Full of Elevating Pleasures at AllMusic
