= On (Boom Boom Satellites album) =

Studio album by Boom Boom Satellites
- Released: May 17, 2006; November 22, 2006 (Limited Edition)
- Genre: Big beat, electronica, rock, grebo
- Length: 48:26
- Label: Sony Japan

Boom Boom Satellites chronology
Full of Elevating Pleasures (2005)	On (2006)	Exposed (2007)

Limited edition cover
- Limited edition DVD pack cover

On is the fifth studio album from Japanese electronica/rock duo Boom Boom Satellites, released on May 17, 2006. The album was released in two editions: a regular edition and a limited edition that included a DVD.

On the Oricon rankings, the album reached a peak rank of 8 and charted for 12 weeks.

== Track listing ==
All tracks are written by Boom Boom Satellites

No.	Title	Length
1.	"Kick It Out"	4:41
2.	"9 Doors Empire"	4:36
3.	"Girl"	4:34
4.	"id"	1:30
5.	"Play"	3:51
6.	"She's So High"	3:28
7.	"Pill"	3:45
8.	"Generator"	5:46
9.	"Beat It"	3:33
10.	"Porcupine"	2:23
11.	"Nothing"	4:38
12.	"Loaded"	5:41
Total length:		48:26

=== DVD track listing ===
No.	Title	Length
1.	"Kick It Out"
2.	"Girl"
3.	"Pill"
