= Photon (album) =

2002 album by Boom Boom Satellites

Studio album by Boom Boom Satellites
- Released: July 24, 2002
- Genre: Grebo, big beat, alternative rock, rap rock, electronic rock
- Length: 48:05
- Label: Sony Japan

Boom Boom Satellites chronology
Umbra (2001)	Photon (2002)	Full of Elevating Pleasures (2005)

Singles from Photon
- 1. "Blink" Released: July 26, 2002; 2. "Light My Fire" Released: October 2003

Photon is the third studio album from Japanese electronica/rock duo Boom Boom Satellites, released on July 24, 2002.

== Release ==
"Light My Fire" is the second and final single taken from Photon. It was released in October 2003 in the UK only on the 'Different Records' label. It was released as a standard 12" vinyl and also as a promotional CD. Both versions contain "Sloughin' Blue" from the band's Umbra album as the second track, perhaps indicating the release was intended to promote the band themselves in Europe rather than a particular album.

== Track listing ==
All tracks are written by Boom Boom Satellites.

No.	Title	Length
1.	"Inception"	2:12
2.	"Light My Fire"	4:51
3.	"Beluga"	6:10
4.	"Dress Like an Angel"	6:06
5.	"Piper"	3:24
6.	"40 –Forty–"	6:00
7.	"Blink"	7:18
8.	"Amber"	5:17
9.	"Let It Lift"	5:34
10.	"I.A.I.T. (Intercity Dub)"	2:02
Total length:		48:54

== Photon – Commin' 2 a Phase ==
Photon Commin' 2 A Phase

Studio album by Boom Boom Satellites
- Released: September 29, 2003
- Genre: Rap rock
- Length: 54:25
- Label: Sony Japan

Singles from Photon – Commin' 2 a Phase
- 1. "Fogbound" Released: March 8, 2000; 2. "Soliloquy" Released: July 18, 2001; 3. "Blink" Released: June 26, 2002; 4. "Light My Fire" Released: October 2003

Photon – Commin' 2 a Phase is an alternate version of Photon, released in the UK by Different Records. It features an adjusted track list, re-recorded versions of a number of tracks and different artwork. It was released on September 29, 2003. Track 6 contains samples from "Mannequin Republic" by At The Drive In.

=== Commin' 2 a Phase track listing ===
All tracks are written by Boom Boom Satellites.

No.	Title	Length
1.	"Light My Fire"	4:47
2.	"Fogbound – Encounter Point"	4:38
3.	"Blink"	5:22
4.	"40 – Forty"	5:26
5.	"Let It Lift"	5:03
6.	"Dress Like an Angel"	5:30
7.	"Looking Glass"	0:58
8.	"Soliloquy"	5:36
9.	"Panacea"	1:15
10.	"Ingrained"	6:27
11.	"Piper"	3:35
12.	"Brandnew Battering Ram"	5:48
Total length:		54:25

== Personnel ==
Credits adapted from liner notes.

- A&R – Hanako Tabata
- A&R [International] – Bob Fisher
- Art Direction, Design – Shin-Ichiro Hirata*
- Artwork [Cover Art Coordinated By] – Shin Sasaki
- Coordinator [Coordinated By] – Umu Productions U.K.
- Directed By – Shin Yasui
- Drums [Additional Drummer] – Naoki Hirai
- Executive-Producer – Lucy Tonegi, Shunsuke Muramatsu
- Illustration [Cover Illustration] – Mitsuki Nakamura
- Management [Artist] – Hiroki Sakaida, Lucy Tonegi
- Management [International] – Sean Phillips, Sekui Mirata
- Mastered By [Mastering Engineer] – Tom Coyne
- Mixed By – Masayuki Nakano
- Other [International Marketing] – Archie Meguro, Sampei Yamaguchi, Tomoko "Tomi" Yamamoto
- Producer – Boom Boom Satellites
- Programmed By, Bass – Masayuki Nakano
- Technician [Instruments] – Yasuyuki "Texas" Oguro*
- Vocals, Guitar – Michiyuki Kawashima
