= Umbra (album) =

Studio album by Boom Boom Satellites
- Released: February 7, 2001
- Genre: Electronica, rock
- Length: 50:37
- Label: Sony Japan

Boom Boom Satellites chronology
Out Loud (1998)	Umbra (2001)	Photon (2002)

Singles from Out Loud
- 1. "Fogbound" Released: March 8, 2000; 2. "Sloughin' Blue" Released: January 24, 2001; 3. "Soliloquy" Released: July 18, 2001

Professional ratings
Review scores
Source	Rating
AllMusic	2/5 stars

Umbra is the second studio album from Japanese electronica/rock duo Boom Boom Satellites, released on February 7, 2001.

== Release ==
"Fogbound" is the first single from Umbra. It was initially released on March 8, 2000. It was featured on the OST for the game Ridge Racer V.

"Sloughin' Blue" is the second single from Umbra. It was initially released on January 24, 2001.

== Track listing ==
All tracks are written by Boom Boom Satellites.

No.	Title	Length
1.	"Sloughin' Blue"	6:25
2.	"Ingrained"	6:43
3.	"Brandnew Battering Ram"	5:43
4.	"Your Reality's a Fantasy But Your Fantasy Is Killing Me" (feat. Chuck D)	5:51
5.	"Ego"	5:50
6.	"Looking Glass"	0:57
7.	"Fogbound –Flit Through"	6:32
8.	"Sinker"	5:54
9.	"Soliloquy"	5:36
10.	"Panacea"	1:14
Total length:		50:45

== Personnel ==
Credits adapted from liner notes.

- Art Direction, Design – Shin-Ichiro Hirata*
- Artwork [Artwork Co-ordinator] – Yuki Sugawara
- Directed By – Tatsunori Toyama
- Drums [Additional Drummer] – Naoki Hirai
- Engineer [Additional] – Kenji Furukawa, Kikou Uehara, Mike Nealsen*
- Executive-Producer – Hirofumi Satoh, Lucy Tonegi
- Lyrics By – Chuck D (tracks: 4)
- Mastered By – Quincy Tanaka*
- Photography By – Yoshiyuki Hata
- Programmed By, Bass – Masayuki Nakano
- Saxophone, Flute – Nao Takeuchi (tracks: 3 to 5)
- Strings, Arranged By – Asuka Strings (tracks: 2)
- Trumpet – Issei Igarashi (tracks: 3)
- Vocals, Guitar – Michiyuki Kawashima
- Written-By, Arranged By, Producer, Mixed By – Boom Boom Satellites
