= Star Trek: Prodigy season 1 =

First season of Star Trek: Prodigy

Star Trek: Prodigy
- Season 1
- Promotional poster
- Showrunners: Kevin Hageman; Dan Hageman
- Starring: Brett Gray; Ella Purnell; Jason Mantzoukas; Angus Imrie; Rylee Alazraqui; Dee Bradley Baker; Jimmi Simpson; John Noble; Kate Mulgrew
- No. of episodes: 20

Release
- Original network: Paramount+
- Original release: October 28, 2021 – December 29, 2022

Season chronology
- Next → Season 2

The first season of the American animated television series Star Trek: Prodigy follows a group of young aliens who find an abandoned Starfleet ship, the USS Protostar, and must learn to work together as they make their way from the Delta Quadrant to the Alpha Quadrant. The season was produced by CBS Eye Animation Productions and Nickelodeon Animation Studio in association with Secret Hideout, Roddenberry Entertainment, and Brothers Hageman Productions. Kevin and Dan Hageman served as showrunners.

Brett Gray, Ella Purnell, Jason Mantzoukas, Angus Imrie, Rylee Alazraqui, and Dee Bradley Baker voice the young crew of the Protostar, with Jimmi Simpson, John Noble, and Kate Mulgrew also providing voices for the series, the latter reprising her role as Kathryn Janeway from Star Trek: Voyager. Nickelodeon ordered the series in April 2019 and the Hageman brothers were attached as showrunners. Ben Hibon was announced as director and creative lead in August 2020. The writers split the season into two 10-episode "mini-arcs" featuring Noble's the Diviner and Mulgrew's Admiral Janeway as their respective main adversaries. In February 2021, the series' debut was moved to Paramount+.

The season premiered on the streaming service Paramount+ on October 28, 2021, and the first 10 episodes were released through February 2022. It premiered on the cable channel Nickelodeon on December 17, 2021. The next 10 episodes were released on Paramount+ from October to December 2022. The season was met with positive reviews from critics and received a Children's and Family Emmy Award. The series was canceled and removed from Paramount+ in June 2023; Netflix picked it up that October and the season was released on that service in December ahead of a second season in 2024.

== Episodes ==
No. overall	No. in season	Title	Directed by	Written by	Original release date
Part 1
1	1	"Lost and Found"	Ben Hibon	Kevin & Dan Hageman	October 28, 2021
2	2	"Lost and Found"	Ben Hibon	Kevin & Dan Hageman	October 28, 2021
On the Tars Lamora prison colony in the Delta Quadrant, a young alien named Dal dreams of escaping. The colony's leader, The Diviner, sends his robotic enforcer Drednok to capture a problematic prisoner, "Zero", who causes an explosion that allows Dal to get away. Dal is captured before he can escape and is interrogated by the Diviner's daughter Gwyn, who gives him one day to locate Zero. Descending to the deep core mining level, Dal is partnered with a Brikar who speaks another language and grows angry at Dal's attempts to search for Zero, accidentally causing a rock collapse that reveals the abandoned Federation starship USS Protostar. The starship's translator allows the Brikar to introduce herself as Rok-Tahk. Zero watches this happen and introduces themselves, while the group is expanded to include engineer Jankom Pog and indestructible blob Murf. When they are confronted by Drednok and Gwyn, they take Gwyn hostage and escape from Tars Lamora in the Protostar. They are greeted by a training hologram with the likeness of former USS Voyager Captain Kathryn Janeway.
3	3	"Starstruck"	Alan Wan	Chad Quandt	November 4, 2021
Janeway, under the assumption that the colony escapists are Starfleet cadets, begins to train them on how to operate the Protostar and explains to them the purpose of the Federation and Starfleet. While Zero, Jankom, Rok-Tahk and Murf are eager to join the Federation, Dal—who has appointed himself Captain of the ship—dismisses Janeway. When he unknowingly directs Zero to fly the Protostar into a dying star, Dal is forced to ask for Janeway's help to save themselves and the ship. Meanwhile, Gwyn is held prisoner but begins to plot an escape so she can gain control of the ship and return it to her father, who is already in pursuit with Drednok.
4	4	"Dream Catcher"	Steve Ahn & Sung Shin	Lisa Schultz Boyd	November 11, 2021
Dal and the crew find an M-Class planet and decide to land the Protostar on its surface to investigate it. Using the ship's exploration vehicle the Runaway, the crew finds the planet to be very hospitable and decide to split up. Alone, each of them sees the thing that they each desire most, which for Dal is a representation of the parents that he does not remember. He soon realizes that these illusions are not what they seem and races to save the others from the planet. On the Protostar, Gwyn escapes captivity and takes control of the ship. She is able to get out with Murf before the planet attacks the ship and throws it 10 kilometers away.
5	5	"Terror Firma"	Alan Wan & Olga Ulanova	Julie & Shawna Benson	November 18, 2021
The group find Murf and an injured Gwyn, and Janeway activates a beacon to direct the team to the ship while defending it from the planet's attacks. After they spend most of the day traveling in circles due to the planet changing its terrain around them, Dal and Gwyn devise a solution together to navigate towards the ship using the stars. The Diviner and Drednok soon arrive, but the young crew are able to make it to the ship when the Diviner is tricked by the planet into thinking the ship is somewhere else. When he and Drednok return to their own ship, they pursue the Protostar but lose it when the young crew, including Gwyn, activates the special "proto-warp" function.
6	6	"Kobayashi"	Alan Wan	Aaron J. Waltke	January 6, 2022
The Protostar comes out of proto-warp after a 4,000-light-year jump into the Gamma Quadrant. Janeway introduces the crew to the holodeck, which can simulate virtual environments, and Dal uses it to take the Kobayashi Maru, a Starfleet captaincy examination. After unsuccessfully taking the test many times, even with a simulated crew of famous Starfleet officers, Dal learns that it is a no-win scenario and a good captain accepts some situations as being out of their control. Meanwhile, Gwyn uses her knowledge of languages to decipher a section of code in Janeway's memory bank that reveals the Protostar's original crew was boarded by an unknown enemy.
7	7	"First Con-tact"	Steve Ahn & Sung Shin	Diandra Pendleton-Thompson	January 13, 2022
The crew responds to a distress signal that turns out to be Nandi, a Ferengi smuggler who raised Dal. Nandi has cloaking technology on her ship that can be powered by the chimerium crystals on the Protostar, and she offers to give the technology to the crew if they help her retrieve a remalite crystal from a nearby, unexplored planet. Janeway warns that interfering with the young civilization on that planet would violate Starfleet's Prime Directive, but her concerns are dismissed and the crew help Nandi steal the crystal. When they realize the damage that they have done, the crew steal the crystal back and return it to the planet, but Nandi escapes with their chimerium.
8	8	"Time Amok"	Olga Ulanova & Sung Shin	Nikhil S. Jayaram	January 20, 2022
Nandi contacts the Diviner and gives him the location of the Protostar. It will take months for them to reach that location, but the Diviner is able to hack the ship's shuttlecraft replicator to form a copy of Drednok. After the crew fail to work together to solve a riddle, the Protostar goes through a tachyon storm that splits each of them into different streams of time where each experience the speed of time differently. Janeway moves between each crewmember and helps them all contribute to a plan to save the ship. Experiencing time the slowest, Rok-Tahk finishes the plan and reverses the anomaly. A partially completed replication of Drednok survives the event.
9	9	"A Moral Star"	Ben Hibon	Kevin & Dan Hageman, Julie & Shawna Benson, Lisa Schultz Boyd, Nikhil S. Jayaram, Diandra Pendleton-Thompson, Chad Quandt & Aaron J. Waltke	January 27, 2022
10	10	"A Moral Star"	Ben Hibon	Kevin & Dan Hageman, Julie & Shawna Benson, Lisa Schultz Boyd, Nikhil S. Jayaram, Diandra Pendleton-Thompson, Chad Quandt & Aaron J. Waltke	February 3, 2022
Part 1: The Drednok replication displays a message from the Diviner offering to free the miners of Tars Lamora if the crew return the Protostar to him. They are eager to help the miners, though Dal is hesitant about returning to the prison. Forming a plan, they proto-warp to Tars Lamora and give the Protostar to the Diviner, who departs with Drednok and Gwyn after destroying the Tars Lamora power source. He soon discovers that the "proto-star" that powers the proto-warp engine is missing; the indestructible Murf consumed it as part of the plan, with the others preparing to restore Tars Lamora's power so they can escape with the miners on the Diviner's ship. Part 2: The Protostar returns to Tars Lamora where the crew destroy Drednok and restore power. The Diviner reveals to Gwyn that he was sent from the future to prevent the destruction of their people after first contact with Starfleet caused a civil war; he plans to destroy Starfleet with a computer virus onboard the Protostar. Zero reveals their true form to the Diviner, driving him mad, while Gwyn sees Zero's reflection and loses her memory of the Diviner's plan. The Diviner is left in exile on Tars Lamora, the miners leave on his ship, and the crew of the Protostar fly towards Federation space where they are tracked by the real Janeway on the USS Dauntless.
Part 2
11	11	"Asylum"	Steve Ahn & Sung Shin	Kevin & Dan Hageman	October 27, 2022
The Protostar crew seek asylum at a remote Starfleet communications relay station in the Beta Quadrant, manned by Lieutenant Frex. In biometric scans, Murf is revealed to be a Mellanoid slime worm and Dal's race is said to be known, but the information is restricted to Starfleet Command. Gwyn uses the station's sickbay to restore her memories of the Diviner's plan, but she is too late to warn Frex, who connects to the Protostar's systems and activates the virus. The station destroys itself, Frex escapes, and the young crew return to the Protostar. Meanwhile, Vice Admiral Janeway and the Dauntless trace the Protostar's path and find the Diviner on Tars Lamora.
12	12	"Let Sleeping Borg Lie"	Olga Ulanova & Sung Shin	Diandra Pendleton-Thompson	November 3, 2022
The crew find the construct that holds the virus in a hidden sub-deck on the ship, and are unable to destroy it. Coming across a dormant Borg Cube, they wonder if the Borg could help disarm the weapon. On the Cube, Zero connects to the Borg collective to search for information and is assimilated. The others are captured, but Gwyn is able to break Zero away from the collective and they return the Borg to dormancy. The crew return to the Protostar learning that the construct cannot be disarmed or removed. Meanwhile, the Dauntless finds the wreckage of the relay station. Admiral Janeway has the Diviner revived but he does not have his memories.
13	13	"All the World's a Stage"	Andrew L. Schmidt	Aaron J. Waltke	November 10, 2022
The Protostar crew responds to a distress call from an M-class planet, except for Murf who is unwell. They discover an alien race called the "Enderprizians" who revere and imitate Starfleet. A mysterious disease is afflicting the villagers, and also infects Dal. They track the disease to a cave holding a Federation shuttlecraft that crashed on the planet with Ensign Garrovick of the USS Enterprise long ago. The shuttlecraft is leaking plasma and poisoning the environment. The crew and villagers work together to dispose of the shuttlecraft and seal the cave while Zero devises a cure. When the crew return to the Protostar, they find Murf encased in a cocoon.
14	14	"Crossroads"	Steve Ahn & Sung Shin	Lisa Schultz Boyd	November 17, 2022
The crew decide to reach Starfleet with a different ship and hide the Protostar near a busy transportation hub. A man named Okona overhears their need and offers travel, but is arrested for smuggling. Admiral Janeway seeks Frex at the same hub, and realizes that the crew of the Protostar are there. The young crew race back to the Protostar and are pursued by Janeway. They find that Okona has stowed away with them. The Dauntless pursues the Protostar at warp speed. Murf hatches from his cocoon in a more humanoid body. Admiral Janeway fires on the Protostar, disabling its warp drive, and the young crew retreat to the Romulan Neutral Zone.
15	15	"Masquerade"	Sung Shin	Nikhil S. Jayaram	November 24, 2022
The Protostar stops for repairs at a starport, where geneticist Dr. Jago informs Dal that he is a human augmented with 26 other species. She gives Dal an implant to unlock his dormant abilities. Romulans enter the Neutral Zone to steal the Protostar, but need the captain to gain control of the ship. They pursue the crew, causing Okona to flee. Dal subdues the Romulans with his new abilities, but begins to lose control. Murf helps repel the last attackers and they escape on the Protostar. Zero removes Dal's implant and he returns to normal. On the Dauntless, Ensign Asencia reveals to the Diviner that she is the Vindicator, a member of his species.
16	16	"Preludes"	Steve Ahn & Sung Shin	Julie & Shawna Benson, Kevin & Dan Hageman, Nikhil S. Jayaram, Diandra Pendleton-Thompson, Chad Quandt, Lisa Schultz Boyd & Aaron J. Waltke	December 1, 2022
As the crew of the Protostar repair the proto-drive, each of them recounts how they got to Tars Lamora. Rok used to play a "monster" in staged fights, but one day she decided to fight back and defeat the "hero"; she was sold off soon after. Zero was part of a Medusan exploration crew when they were captured by hunters. Jankom was awakened early from cryogenic sleep on a Tellarite ship and repaired critical damage to the vessel, before leaving in an escape pod so enough oxygen would remain for the rest of the crew; he was captured soon after. On the Dauntless, the Vindicator and her own Drednok help the Diviner remember his past.
17	17	"Ghost in the Machine"	Andrew L. Schmidt	Chad Quandt	December 8, 2022
The crew unsuccessfully uses the holodeck to simulate attempts to warn the Dauntless of the virus. They are then trapped inside their own personal holodeck simulations: Zero's detective story, Jankom's street fighting simulation, a jazz club program for Murf, and an amalgam of Dal's pirate simulation and Rok's virtual pet game. Zero deduces that by not completing the simulations they can escape, and the crew are able to end the program. Hologram Janeway is revealed to have trapped them in the holodeck, acting under a secret subroutine programmed by the construct to keep them distracted until they reach Federation space.
18	18	"Mindwalk"	Sung Shin	Julie & Shawna Benson	December 15, 2022
The Protostar heads for Federation space with the Dauntless close behind. Dal use his nascent telepathic ability to warn Admiral Janeway about the construct, but accidentally swaps bodies with her. Janeway, in Dal's body, learns the story of the Protostar's young crew, repairs Hologram Janeway, and vows to help the team, though she notes that Dal cannot join Starfleet because Augments are outlawed. On the Dauntless, Dal's attempts to pass as the admiral arouse suspicion. Janeway and Dal are able to swap back by touching hands during a spacewalk between the two ships, and Dal returns to the Protostar. The ship leaves warp to face a Federation armada.
19	19	"Supernova"	Andrew L. Schmidt	Erin McNamara	December 22, 2022
20	20	"Supernova"	Ben Hibon	Kevin & Dan Hageman	December 29, 2022
Part 1: The Protostar crew attempt to escape but are fired upon by the fleet. The Vindicator, Diviner, and Drednok beam onto the Protostar where Gwyn and the Vindicator fight. Drednok defeats the others easily, and then helps stop Gwyn. The Diviner is fatally wounded attempting to save his daughter, whom he entreats to unify their people. The Vindicator activates the weapon and the fleet begins destroying itself. The ships' translators also stop working, but Gwyn uses her linguistic skills to send out a distress signal which is answered by several Federation allies. More Federation ships also arrive and the allies are not enough to stop the collapse of the armada. Part 2: The Protostar crew believe they can stop the destruction by taking the ship to proto-warp and simultaneously destroying it. Hologram Janeway sacrifices herself doing this while the others escape on a hastily built shuttle. This creates a wormhole to the future where Janeway believes the original Starfleet crew of the Protostar may still be alive. When the young crew make it to Earth, they are placed on trial. Admiral Janeway advocates for them and they, including Dal, are allowed to join her as warrant officers on a new mission to find Captain Chakotay and the original Protostar crew. Gwyn chooses to go to her homeworld and attempt to prevent the civil war.

== Cast and characters ==
=== Main ===
- Brett Gray as Dal R'El
- Ella Purnell as Gwyn
- Jason Mantzoukas as Jankom Pog
- Angus Imrie as Zero
- Rylee Alazraqui as Rok-Tahk
- Dee Bradley Baker as Murf
- Jimmi Simpson as Drednok
- John Noble as the Diviner
- Kate Mulgrew as Kathryn Janeway

=== Recurring ===
- Bonnie Gordon as the USS Protostar's computer
- Robert Beltran as Chakotay
- Jameela Jamil as the Vindicator / Asencia
- Jason Alexander as Noum
- Daveed Diggs as Tysess
- Billy Campbell as Thadiun Okona
- Ronny Cox as Edward Jellico

=== Notable guests ===
- René Auberjonois as Odo (Note: Archival audio of these actors from previous Star Trek series and films is used for this series.)
- James Doohan as Montgomery Scott
- Nichelle Nichols as Nyota Uhura
- Leonard Nimoy as Spock
- David Ruprecht as the captain of the Kobayashi Maru
- Gates McFadden as Beverly Crusher
- Fred Tatasciore as Garrovick

== Production ==
=== Development ===
Star Trek franchise producer Alex Kurtzman said in January 2019 that a "kids-focused" animated Star Trek series was in development. Kevin and Dan Hageman joined the series as showrunners by mid-February 2019, when the cable channel Nickelodeon was in talks to air the show. Nickelodeon officially ordered the series in late April 2019, and Ben Hibon was announced as director and creative lead for Star Trek: Prodigy in August 2020. In February 2021, ViacomCBS announced that Prodigy would debut on the new streaming service Paramount+ along with the rest of the Star Trek Universe. The season was revealed to consist of 20 episodes.

=== Writing ===
Writing for the season began by July 2019, and Kurtzman said the writers were close to finishing in August 2020. They created a continuous story for the first two seasons that is broken into 10-episode "mini-arcs". Writer Aaron Waltke described each one as a "self-contained arc, but with plenty of story threads that you could pull to have it continue on to the next". The writers chose to begin the season with a two-part pilot because there was too much information to fit into a single half-hour episode; Kevin Hageman noted that the live-action Star Trek series have twice the amount of time per episode to introduce new concepts. The Hagemans compared the introduction of the young cast to The Goonies (1985) and wanted them all to be introduced properly before they escaped the prison colony with their new starship, the Protostar, at the end of the second episode.

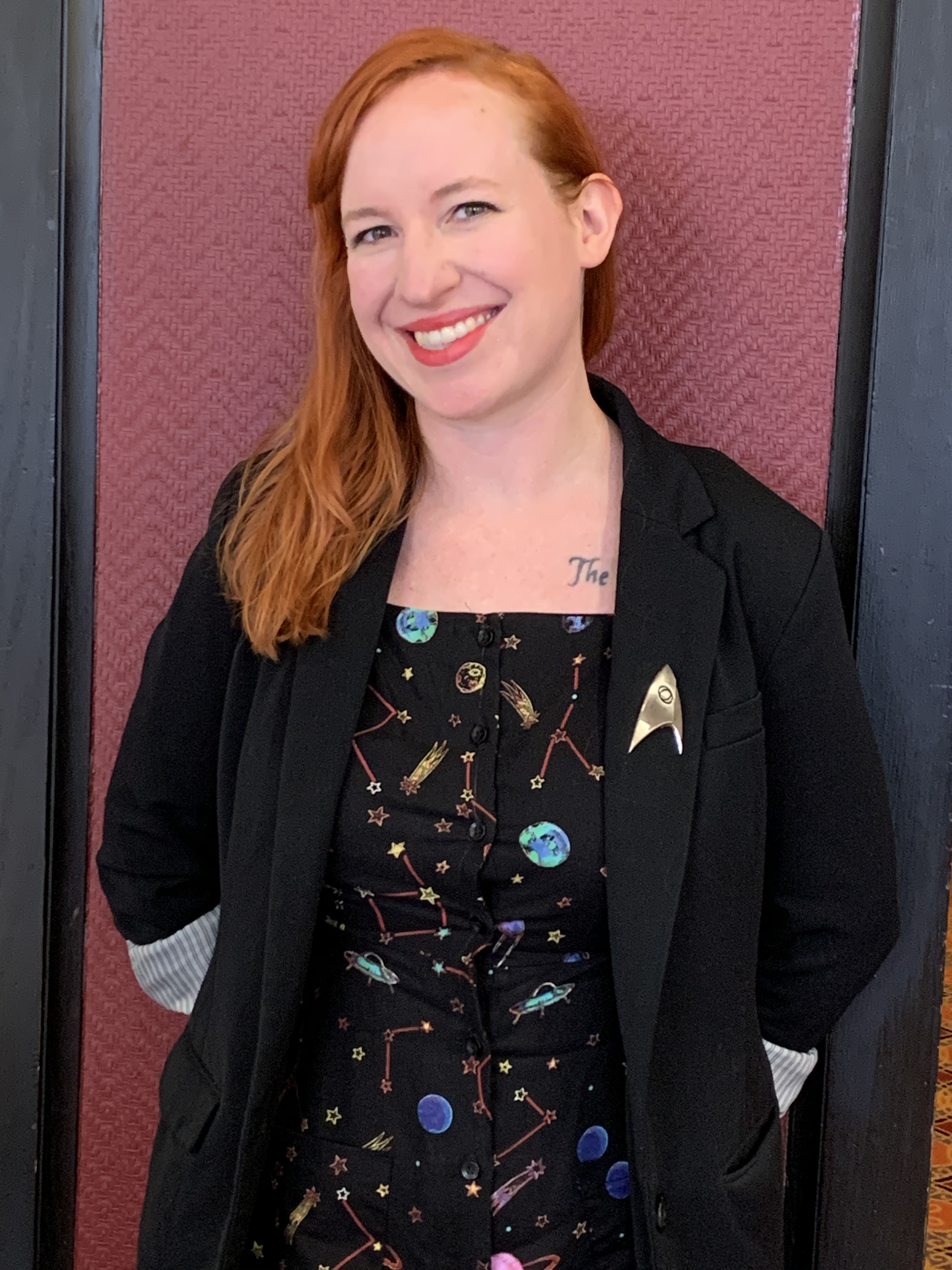
Science consultant Erin Macdonald mapped out the season's time travel storyline, and also has a cameo role in the season finale.

The series begins in the Delta Quadrant, far from the United Federation of Planets and Starfleet in the Alpha Quadrant. In the prison colony, the young protagonists see the Federation as a "promise for something better". They are introduced to different Star Trek concepts by a hologram of former USS Voyager captain Kathryn Janeway, which allows the series to introduce those same ideas to its audience. The story revolves around the secrets of the Protostar, and the backstory of the villainous Diviner who is searching for it. The mid-season finale reveals that the Diviner's homeworld was devastated in a civil war after Starfleet made first contact with them. He travelled back in time to prevent this using a weapon aboard the stolen Protostar. Science consultant Erin Macdonald mapped out the season's time travel storyline to ensure it made sense. Macdonald also has a cameo role in the season finale as a Starfleet doctor.

The writers wanted the second half of the season to put the young crew to the test by introducing a new antagonist. They decided that this would be Starfleet, and more specifically the actual Admiral Janeway who has been searching for the missing Protostar. She is not aware that the young crew are onboard, and none of them know about the Diviner's weapon, which sets up the conflict for the second story arc. Though she is an antagonist, the Hagemans said Admiral Janeway was not a villain and they wanted to explore a story which has "two well-meaning groups with different goals" like the film The Fugitive (1993). The season's second half moves the crew closer to the Federation, mostly taking place in the nearby Beta Quadrant rather than the Delta and Gamma Quadrants of the first half. The writers worked with the showrunners of the other Star Trek series to ensure continuity, including confirming that the Borg should be depicted as dormant following the end of Star Trek: Voyager. That is how they are seen in "Let Sleeping Borg Lie", and Waltke said it was possible that the Borg Cube in that episode is the same one later seen in Star Trek: Picard. The Romulans in the season are shown using similar weapons and outfits to those in Picard because both groups are interested in turning technology against Starfleet.

"Ghost in the Machine" reveals that Hologram Janeway has been unknowingly following the Diviner's plan, which episode writer Chad Quandt compared to The Manchurian Candidate. This is revealed as part of a classic Star Trek "holodeck adventure" that Quandt had been pushing for all season. The next episode, "Mindwalk", also features a classic science fiction trope when Dal and Admiral Janeway switch bodies. Hologram Janeway sacrifices herself in the season finale, which aligned with the Hagemans' intentions to have the mentor figure leave at the end of the coming-of-age story. They felt this would create an emotional ending similar to Star Trek II: The Wrath of Khan (1982), E.T. the Extra-Terrestrial (1982), and The Iron Giant (1999). This also aligned with the writers wanting Hologram Janeway to have character growth like previous Star Trek hologram characters such as Professor Moriarty from Star Trek: The Next Generation and the Doctor from Voyager.

The season is bookended by scenes that emphasize the need for communication, which was a key theme for the Hagemans. In the premiere's prison colony scenes none of the alien characters can understand one another, and in the finale Starfleet's universal translator fails. The Hagemans said "a bunch of aliens on a ship who don't know how to talk to one another" was a metaphor for how people can come together in the real world, and the "universal translator for Starfleet is the thing that really holds them together". They originally intended to end the season with the young Protostar crew joining Starfleet Academy, but the series' Star Trek adviser David Mack argued that it should not be that easy to get into the academy. There was also a series based on Starfleet Academy in development. Instead the characters become "warrant officers in training" under Admiral Janeway.

=== Casting and voice recording ===
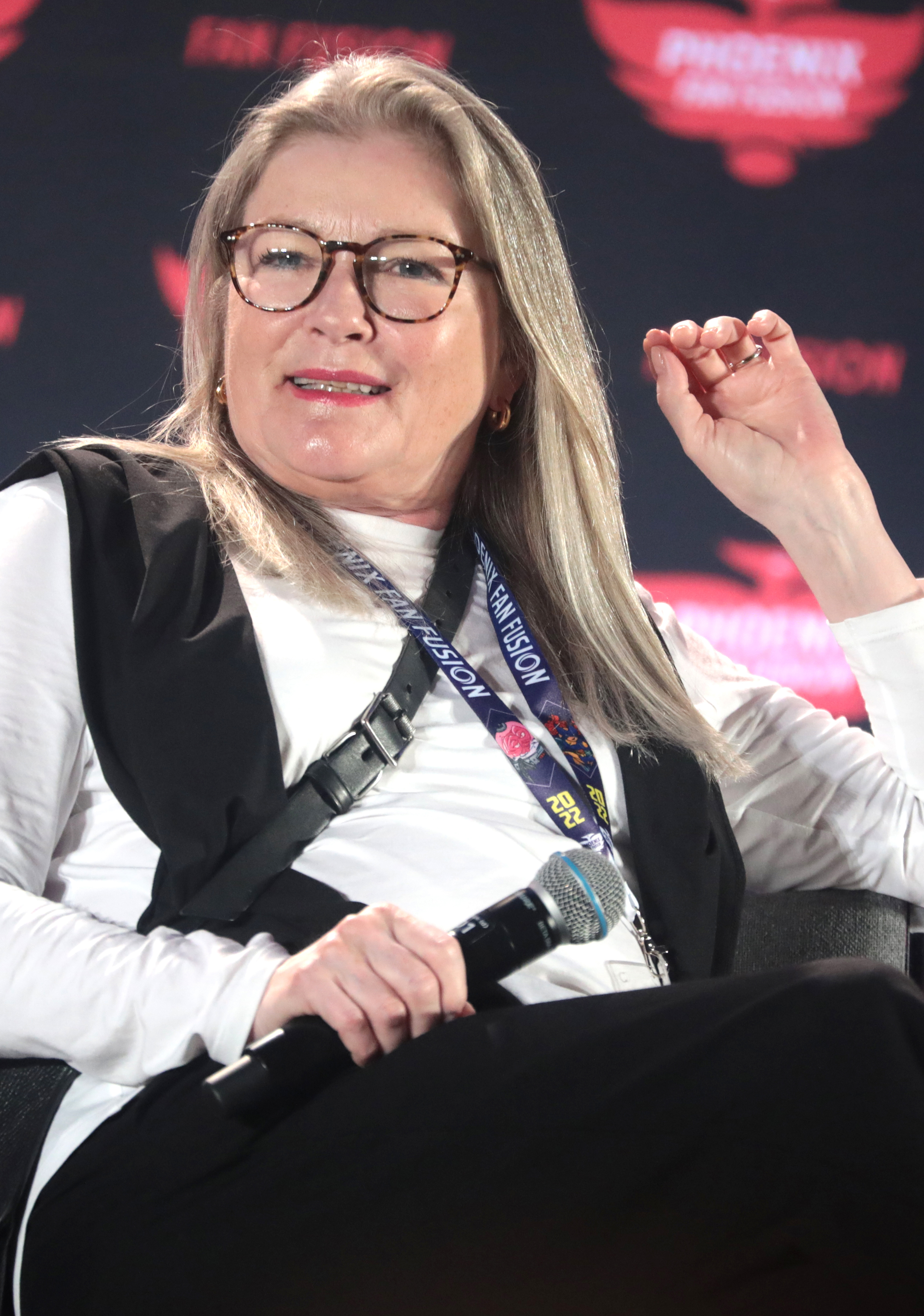
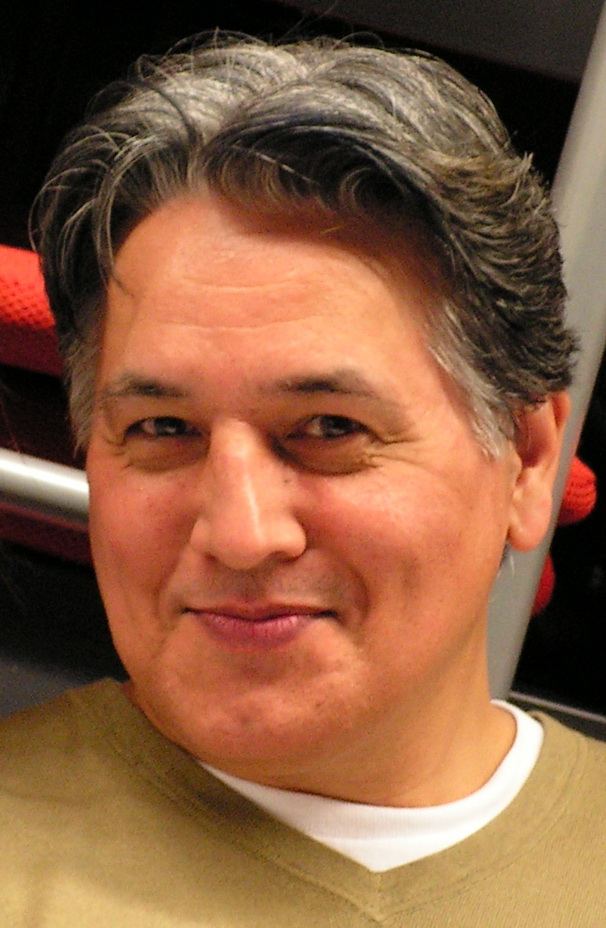
Kate Mulgrew (left) and Robert Beltran (right) reprise their respective roles of Kathryn Janeway and Chakotay from Star Trek: Voyager.

Kate Mulgrew reprises her role of Kathryn Janeway from Star Trek: Voyager, who primarily appears as the USS Protostar's Emergency Training Hologram. Mulgrew also voices the real Janeway, who has a large role in the second half of the season. The voice cast for the series' young protagonists includes Brett Gray as Dal R'El, Ella Purnell as Gwyn, Jason Mantzoukas as Jankom Pog, Angus Imrie as Zero, Rylee Alazraqui as Rok-Tahk, and Dee Bradley Baker as Murf. Additionally, John Noble voices Gwyn's father, the Diviner, and Jimmi Simpson voices the Diviner's robotic enforcer Drednok. Mulgrew revealed in January 2021 that voice recording for the first season had been completed. For the scenes in "Mindwalk" where Dal swaps bodies with Admiral Janeway, Gray and Mulgrew recorded each other's lines first as reference.

Bonnie Gordon was hired to provide temporary "scratch vocals" for Gwyn and Janeway during the series' development, which led to her getting a permanent role as the voice of the Protostar's computer. Gordon also provides the voice for a Brenari ensign in the season's penultimate episode who is one of the refugees Janeway rescued in the Voyager episode "Counterpoint". Billy Campbell revealed in February 2021 that he was reprising his guest role of Thadiun Okona from The Next Generation in the series and said his role was one of several "legacy characters" that were returning for Prodigy. Robert Beltran, who portrayed Chakotay in Voyager, said he was working on Prodigy in August, and was confirmed that October to be reprising his role. Other recurring guests announced in October 2021 include Daveed Diggs as Commander Tysess, Jameela Jamil as Ensign Asencia, and Jason Alexander as Dr. Noum. Alexander previously had a different guest role in Voyager. Campbell's role was officially confirmed in September 2022; he recurs as Okona during the second-half of the season. He suggested adding an eyepatch to the character's design, which the Prodigy showrunners informed the Star Trek: Lower Decks producers of to ensure continuity with Okona's appearance in that series. At New York Comic Con in October, Ronny Cox was announced to also have a recurring role in the second-half of the season, reprising his role as Edward Jellico from The Next Generation who has since been promoted from captain to admiral.

In the sixth episode, Dal takes a holographic simulation of the Kobayashi Maru captaincy test from the film Star Trek II: The Wrath of Khan. In the film, cadets took the test with experienced Starfleet officers as their crew which Waltke chose to replicate by including famous Starfleet officers from previous Star Trek series in the simulation. He originally wanted eight well-known crewmembers and the writers debated which ones to include. This was narrowed down to five characters: René Auberjonois's Odo from Star Trek: Deep Space Nine; James Doohan's Montgomery Scott, Nichelle Nichols's Nyota Uhura, and Leonard Nimoy's Spock from Star Trek: The Original Series; and Gates McFadden's Beverly Crusher from Star Trek: The Next Generation. Archival audio was used, except for McFadden who returned to provide new vocals for the episode. Waltke read around 90 scripts for past Star Trek episodes and watched 40 of those episodes to find lines that could fit into these scenes. He then pulled the dialogue for those lines from the Star Trek archives to be used in the episode. The episode "All the World's a Stage" explains why the character Ensign Garrovick disappeared between the second and third seasons of Star Trek: The Original Series, revealing that he crash-landed on a planet and influenced its culture in a similar way to the Original Series episode "A Piece of the Action". Star Trek: Lower Decks star Fred Tatasciore provided the voice for Garrovick, who was portrayed by Stephen Brooks in the Original Series episode "Obsession".

=== Music ===
The series' music is composed by Nami Melumad, working from a main theme written by her mentor Michael Giacchino. Giacchino advised Melumad to not overuse the theme or the original Star Trek theme by Alexander Courage. She composed several other themes for the season and said the music becomes "more Star Trek-y" as the main characters begin to interact with Starfleet in the second half.

The score was recorded in Budapest with a 64-musician orchestra, and Melumad was glad that this was not impacted by the COVID-19 pandemic, which had forced other series to record their musicians individually. Selections from the score were released after the debut of each episode, leading to a full soundtrack album at the end of the season. All music composed by Nami Melumad, except where noted:

Star Trek: Prodigy (Original Music from the Series)
No.	Title	Artist(s)	Length
1.	"Star Trek: Prodigy (Main Theme)"	Michael Giacchino	2:52
2.	"Tars Lamora"		4:11
3.	"Fly Me Hover"		2:10
4.	"It's Not O-Kazon"		2:18
5.	"The Last of Vau N'Akat"		2:27
6.	"Zero Zeros In"		1:00
7.	"In Catboots"		2:57
8.	"Great Mines Work Alike"		1:11
9.	"Mine Your Own Business"		2:04
10.	"USS Protostar NX-76884"		4:16
11.	"Close Encounters of the Curious Kind"		1:55
12.	"Trust Me, I'm an Engineer"		2:42
13.	"Cultural Studies"		0:46
14.	"No Dal Moment"		2:31
15.	"The Surge Between Us"		4:25
16.	"Have a Nice Fight"		3:54
17.	"Get Outer Space"		5:12
18.	"Always Wanted to See the Stars"		1:37
19.	"Divine Intervention"		0:41
20.	"Starfleet 101 – Introduction to Starfleet"		5:17
21.	"Trading Spaces"		1:58
22.	"Live Well and Prosper"		2:21
23.	"Second First Contact"		0:54
24.	"Red Alert"		2:35
25.	"Whatever Floats Your Boat"		4:26
26.	"Pathfinder"		3:18
27.	"A Nudge in the Right Direction"		1:29
28.	"The Revenant-12"		1:03
29.	"First Away Mission"		3:46
30.	"Set Phasers to Fun"		3:14
31.	"Gwyning Control, Pt. 1"		1:21
32.	"Gwyning Control, Pt. 2"		1:34
33.	"Curiouser and Curiouser"		2:48
34.	"Persistence of Vision"		2:16
35.	"Weird is Part of the Job"		2:09
36.	"Running a Tied Ship"		4:52
37.	"From Here to Where"		3:38
38.	"Moving Mountains"		2:55
39.	"Watcher in the Woods"		2:05
40.	"juppu' maHlaH"		4:28
41.	"Unwelcome Visitor"		3:11
42.	"Dream Catcher, You Heart Breaker"		3:42
43.	"My Protostar, My Choice"		3:09
44.	"Proto, I Have a Feeling We Aren't in Delta Quadrant Anymore"		2:19
45.	"Holodeck 101"		3:29
46.	"A Penny for Your Thoughts"		1:21
47.	"You Are My Blood, My Spirit's Song"		1:32
48.	"Starfleet's Finest"		2:29
49.	"Coffee First"		1:26
50.	"Dal vs. the Kobayashi Maru"		1:46
51.	"Murftoot"		1:31
52.	"A Captain with a Plan"		0:28
53.	"Lightningboom"	Nami Melumad and Jacques Bratubar	1:32
54.	"Stinger of Prey"		0:23
55.	"The Measure of a Captain"		2:32
56.	"Found in Translation"		1:10
57.	"Beam Me out"		1:57
58.	"Meet and Greed"		3:10
59.	"Ferengi Rule of Acquisition No. 208"		3:15
60.	"First Con-Tact"		2:48
61.	"Frame 245"		0:37
62.	"Crystal Matters"		1:14
63.	"The Cymari Song"		4:31
64.	"The Prime Deceptive"		2:47
65.	"Who Your True Friends Are"		1:47
Total length:			2:42:00

== Marketing ==
Mulgrew's casting was announced at a virtual Star Trek Universe panel for New York Comic Con in October 2020. A first look at the main characters was released during the February 2021 ViacomCBS Investor Day, and a first look at Hologram Janeway was revealed during the "First Contact Day" virtual event on April 5, 2021, celebrating the fictional holiday marking first contact between humans and aliens in the Star Trek universe. Mulgrew and Gray promoted the series at a "Star Trek Day" event on September 8, 2022, where the mid-season premiere date was announced and a new clip from the second half of the first season was shown. A mid-season trailer was revealed by the Hagemans at the Star Trek Universe panel for New York Comic Con in October, which also featured Mulgrew, Gray, Jamil, and executive producers Kurtzman, Roddenberry, and Hibon. For the second half of the season, an excerpt from Admiral Janeway's personal log was released each week on Instagram. The logs were written by Waltke and voiced by Mulgrew, and include details that are not revealed in the series. These include the Protostar's original mission to complete the work started by Voyager in the Delta Quadrant, and the involvement of Voyager character B'Elanna Torres in the design of the USS Dauntless.

== Release ==
=== Streaming and broadcast ===
When the season was revealed to be premiering on the streaming service Paramount+ rather than the cable channel Nickelodeon, it was expected to be released in two halves with the first streaming on Paramount+ and then airing on Nickelodeon before the second did the same. The season premiered on Paramount+ on October 28, 2021, and its first five episodes were released through November 18. The rest of the first 10 episodes were released beginning on January 6, 2022. The first half of the season premiered on Nickelodeon on December 17, 2021, before a weekly airing on the channel from July 8 to August 5, 2022. After their Nickelodeon debut, the episodes were made available on Nick.com, the Nick App, and Nick On Demand. The 10-episode second half of the first season was released on Paramount+ in the U.S. beginning October 27, 2022. The season was removed from Paramount+ in June 2023 after the series was canceled by the streaming service. Netflix picked up the series that October, and began streaming the first season on December 25.

=== Home media ===
The first 10 episodes of the season were released on DVD and Blu-ray in the U.S. on January 3, 2023. The release includes bonus content and a set of cards featuring key art from the season. All of the season's episodes were made available for digital purchase in late July, marking the first time they were all available since the series was removed from Paramount+ a month earlier. A DVD and Blu-ray release for the final 10 episodes of the season was released on September 26, and includes more than 45 minutes of behind-the-scenes content along with collectible character cards. Releases featuring the full first season were set for the UK and Germany.

== Reception ==
=== Viewership ===
Parrot Analytics, an analytics company that determines audience "demand expressions" based on various data sources, reported in July 2023 that Prodigy was 18.8 times more in demand than the average television show in the United States. Only 2.7 percent of series had that level of demand, which was an increase of 38.4 percent from when the series was cancelled by Paramount+ the month before. In the week following the season's release on Netflix that December, it was ranked in the Netflix Kids Top 10 list for several countries including the United States, United Kingdom, Austria, Germany, Switzerland, New Zealand, Australia, Italy, and France.

=== Critical response ===
The review aggregator website Rotten Tomatoes reported a 94% approval rating for the first season, with an average rating of 8.1/10 based on 18 reviews. Metacritic gave it a weighted average score of 68 out of 100 based on reviews from 5 critics, indicating "generally favorable reviews".

Alex Maidy of JoBlo.com rated the series "great" and wrote: "Star Trek: Prodigy proves that it is entirely possible for Gene Roddenberry's vision to be both action-packed and thought-provoking... it is a rip-roaring adventure that will keep adults engaged, make kids think, and opens up endless possibilities for Star Trek more than any other series since the 1966 original." Collier Jennings of Collider praised the series in his review, claiming "it is one of the best new entries in the Star Trek franchise... Prodigy wrings genuine emotion out of its moments, proving that even though it's targeted toward a younger audience it won't speak down to said audience." Tara Bennett of IGN rated the episode 7 out of 10 and wrote: "Prodigy has the slick look of a high-end movie" and "The premiere sets the stage for a credible course for adventure that has the potential to grow into something special." Bennet praised the performances and said Ella Purnell's Gwyn and Rylee Alazraqui's Rok-Tahk are already stealing a lot of their scenes. Joel Keller of Decider.com wrote, "The animation, writing and action sequences make the show equally accessible to Trekkers, as well. Mulgrew's performance as a slightly more wise-acre version of Voyager's Janeway grounds the show in Trek's universe, but only just enough to not get it mired in the franchise's drier, more talky tendencies. The first episode is full of well-designed action that ratchets up tension and keeps all viewers engaged, whether they're kids or grownups." Jeff Ewing of Slashfilm praised Star Trek: Prodigy's bold themes and unique tone aimed at both young and old audiences, noting it is "well-paced for modern audiences with a strong set of character introductions, good action sequences, and a lot of open-ended potential. It strikes as ably accomplishing its goals to introduce younger audiences to the world of "Trek," finding a strong path to do so with its young characters' guided trip through the galaxy." Keith DeCandido, author of several Star Trek novels, praised Prodigy in a review for Tor.com, saying it was even better than Discovery, Picard, and Lower Decks. DeCandido noted that "the target audience is on Nickelodeon, but honestly this show's audience is anyone who loves Star Trek, because this is very much a Trek show." Zack Handlen of The A.V. Club gave the first episode a grade B and said the show had potential. He wrote: "The series is aimed at children, but in a cheery all-ages kind of way that avoids insulting its audience even if it never quite manages to impress them." Shah Shahid of Comic Years praised Prodigy as "a beautiful way to remind audiences of what the promise of a bright future means to those without that hope... and at the end of the day, that is ultimately what Roddenberry intended." CNN.com's Brian Lowry was critical of the first episode and wrote: "The show mostly just transparently trades off the 'Trek' title without feeling like it's going anywhere, boldly or otherwise."

=== Accolades ===
Year	Award	Category	Recipient	Result	Ref.
2022	Children's and Family Emmy Awards	Outstanding Animated Series	Star Trek: Prodigy	Nominated	
2022	Children's and Family Emmy Awards	Outstanding Individual Achievement in Animation – Production Design	Alessandro Taini	Won	
2023	TCA Awards	Outstanding Achievement in Family Programming	Star Trek: Prodigy	Nominated	
2023	Tell-Tale TV Awards	Favorite Animated Series	Star Trek: Prodigy	Won	
2023	Children's and Family Emmy Awards	Outstanding Sound Mixing and Sound Editing for an Animated Program	Star Trek: Prodigy	Nominated	
