= Star Trek: Prodigy season 2 =

Second season of Star Trek: Prodigy

Star Trek: Prodigy
- Season 2
- Promotional poster
- Showrunners: Kevin Hageman; Dan Hageman
- Starring: Brett Gray; Ella Purnell; Jason Mantzoukas; Angus Imrie; Jimmi Simpson; John Noble; Robert Beltran; Kate Mulgrew; Rylee Alazraqui; Dee Bradley Baker; Robert Picardo; Jameela Jamil; Wil Wheaton
- No. of episodes: 20

Release
- Original network: Netflix
- Original release: July 1, 2024

Season chronology
- ← Previous; Season 1

The second season of the American animated television series Star Trek: Prodigy follows a group of young aliens who join Admiral Kathryn Janeway on a mission to find the original crew of the USS Protostar, and to learn more about Starfleet as they train to be warrant officers. The season was produced by CBS Eye Animation Productions and Nickelodeon Animation Studio in association with Secret Hideout, Roddenberry Entertainment, and Brothers Hageman Productions. Kevin and Dan Hageman served as showrunners.

Brett Gray, Ella Purnell, Jason Mantzoukas, Angus Imrie, Rylee Alazraqui, and Dee Bradley Baker voice the young warrant officers, with Jimmi Simpson, John Noble, Robert Beltran, Kate Mulgrew, Robert Picardo, Jameela Jamil, and Wil Wheaton also providing voices for the series. Nickelodeon ordered two seasons of Prodigy in April 2019 and the Hageman brothers were attached as showrunners. Ben Hibon was announced as director and creative lead in August 2020. The writers split the season into two 10-episode "mini-arcs".

The series was moved from Nickelodeon to Paramount+ in February 2021, and the second season was set to premiere in late 2023. Paramount+ canceled the season in June, but it was picked up by Netflix that October. The 20 episodes were first released in France on france.tv on March 22, 2024. They were released in the U.S. and other territories on Netflix on July 1, 2024. The season was met with positive reviews from critics and received a Children's and Family Emmy Award.

== Episodes ==
No. overall	No. in season	Title	Directed by	Written by	Original U.S. release date (Note: The full second season was first released in France on france.tv on March 22, 2024.)
Part 1
21	1	"Into the Breach"	Ben Hibon	Kevin & Dan Hageman	July 1, 2024
22	2	"Into the Breach"	Andrew L. Schmidt & Patrick Krebs	Aaron J. Waltke	July 1, 2024
A year after the Protostar crew's aversion of the destruction of Starfleet, Admiral Janeway recruits Dal, Rok Tahk, Jankom Pog, Murf, and Zero to join her aboard the newest incarnation of USS Voyager. At first excited, the recruits are disillusioned because as cadets, they are not allowed to work alongside Janeway, and are snubbed by Nova Squadron, an elite Starfleet fighter pilot squad, led by a young Vulcan named Maj'el. After some unauthorized spying, the cadets discover that Janeway is mounting a secret rescue mission to find Chakotay with a cloak-enabled ship called the Infinity. Janeway swears the cadets to secrecy, but Maj'el overhears Dal discussing this and tries to stop the cadets from moving the Infinity. During the melee, the craft is accidentally activated and sent into the wormhole prematurely. Meanwhile, Gwyn's attempts to win the trust of the present-day Solum fail as she discovers that Ascencia has manipulated the leaders into believing that Gwyn is a threat, prompting them to order her capture. Gwyn escapes and reunites with Ilthuran, the Diviner's younger uncorrupted self.
23	3	"Who Saves the Saviors"	Sung Shin	Erin McNamara	July 1, 2024
With Ilthuran's support, Gwyn challenges Ascencia to a duel. Dal, Jankom, Zero and Maj'el are captured by the Diviner's men and find themselves in the same holding cell with Captain Chakotay and his first officer. In spite of his best efforts to not disrupt the original timeline, which could result in Gwyn never being born, Dal ends up dropping a phaser which Chakotay uses to get into the Protostar to escape. This causes Gwyn to physically phase in and out, and she loses the duel.
24	4	"Temporal Mechanics 101"	Ben Hibon	Keith Sweet II	July 1, 2024
Dal, Zero, Jankom and Maj'el receive a strange message reading "Save Gwyn". Dal, Zero and Maj'el find Gwyn phasing in and out and in great agony. The group deduce that Gwyn had been displaced by time due to their actions disrupting the original timeline. Zero suggests they build a time machine and Dal gets a hands-on lesson in Temporal Mechanics as they convert the Infinity into a time machine. Ilthuran finds Gwyn and comforts her. While phasing in and out of time, Gwyn hears a voice from beyond saying, "You Must Stay Together". Dal's group manages to find Gwyn and bring her back to USS Voyager, where the Doctor places an interphase armband to keep her stable in the present timeline. Meanwhile, Murf is shown communicating with a stranger.
25	5	"Observer's Paradox"	Ruolin Li & Andrew L. Schmidt	Jennifer Muro	July 1, 2024
Gwyn puzzles over the voice she heard in her vision and blames herself for not preventing the civil war on Solum. Murf creates a mural that appears exactly like the spiral Gwyn saw in her vision. The group tries to understand Murf's continual incoherent babbling by converting the universal translator, which fails humorously. After several attempts, they turn to Rok for help. Rok is reluctant but is persuaded by Gillian the humpback whale in Cetacean Ops. Working with Rok, Murf dives in the water and sprouts a tail and fins, which enable him to swim. Gillian translates "Find Me" and a set of coordinates from Murf's words. Gwyn experiences another phasing attack, which finds her floating in space and seeing a spiral and the voice from her previous vision saying, "Find me before they find you". The vision is followed by clicking screeches before Gwyn is pulled back to the prime reality. Gwyn tells the others of her vision and discoveries.
26	6	"Imposter Syndrome"	Sung Shin	Jennifer Muro	July 1, 2024
Dal and his friends create holograms of themselves to take their places while they attempt to take the Infinity, which is scheduled to be destroyed. Trouble ensues because their holograms are programmed to believe they are real. Rok and her hologram decide to work together rather than against each other to find a solution. Dal and friends manage to board Infinity. Unknown to them, their holograms have switched personalities due to a glitch.
27	7	"The Fast and the Curious"	Sung Shin & Sean Bishop	Erin McNamara	July 1, 2024
The Protostar crew take the Infinity through a Borg conduit, to an uncharted planet inhabited by Kazon. Dal, Rok, Gwyn and Jankom are captured while Zero and Murf stay hidden. The crew are pitted against each other in a rigged and dangerous rat race. Dal saves Gwyn and Rok but discovers that one of the Kazon is a robot. This leads Zero and Murf to uncover a mind control device, which they disable. The Kazon reveals the planet was a training facility, until the computer became sentient and went rogue. The computer explains its warped agenda and attaches a mind control device to Murf. Zero says they are all biological beings and reasserts faith in the others before crashing into the computer's core, causing an explosion that destroys the entity. Zero's containment suit is damaged, making independent movement impossible, so they carry Zero and escape. On board Voyager, Maj'el follows holographic Gwyn to her quarters, where a strange entity tries to destroy the hologram, mistaking it for the real Gwyn. The creature vanishes after realizing its mistake and Maj'el enters the quarters to find Gwyn gone.
28	8	"Is There in Beauty No Truth?"	Ruolin Li & Andrew L. Schmidt	Keith Sweet II	July 1, 2024
Zero makes contact with Ion, another Medusan, who offers to give Zero a new body. Gwyn convinces Dal to help Zero and the group detours to Ovidia IV. They discover non-corporeal beings who use the planet to create physical bodies with a sense of touch, smell, and taste. Zero agrees to the transfiguration and participates in the Feast of Senses. Dal and Gwyn learn that their bodies degenerate outside Ovidia IV, and that Zero is participating a fearful and possibly deadly ritual, the "Running of the Nazamon." They find Zero and tell him the truth. Dal is snatched up by the Nazamon. Zero jumps to Dal's rescue. They ride the Nazamon to safety and Zero decides to risk leaving Ovidia IV. Janeway, the Doctor, and Tysses discover the holographic imposters and Gwyn's hologram tells them about the message she received. The Doctor discovers that the ship's computer log has been altered, and holographic Gwyn describes the clicking noises from the creature that tried to erase her. Fearing the worst, Janeway sets a new course to find the real Gwyn before the creatures do.
29	9	"The Devourer of All Things"	Sung Shin	Jennifer Muro	July 1, 2024
30	10	"The Devourer of All Things"	Sean Bishop	Aaron J. Waltke	July 1, 2024
Part 1: The Protostar crew arrive at their destination, the planetary Time Ziggurat headquarters of the Travellers, where they meet their mysterious benefactor – revealed to be Wesley Crusher. Wesley explains that he has found a way for the kids to repair their unravelling timeline. He also explains that the "hole in time" the kids created are attracting The Loom – monstrous, parasitic creatures who feed on dying timelines and manipulate time to hunt their prey. Just then, the Loom arrive, causing Dal, Rok, Zero, Jankom and Murf to freeze in time. Gwyn and Wesley (who both have temporal stabilizers) are not affected. The duo hurry to find more stabilizers for their friends, with the Loom in hot pursuit. After placing the stabilizer armbands, Gwyn, Dal, Zero, Jankom, Rok, Murf and Wesley jump through the vault to escape the Loom. The vault sends them to a safety bunker in the style of an Earth apartment in the 1960s–1970s. Meanwhile, Admiral Janeway tracks down the Infinity's warp trail, ignoring Admiral Jellico's orders to return home. The Voyager-A arrives at the Time Ziggurat, unaware of the danger that awaits below. Part 2: Wesley reveals a plan to find Chakotay and repair the timeline, and says the Loom can erase them from existence. Tysess beams down with Maj'el to locate the Protostar crew with her telepathic link to Zero. The Doctor provides temporal arm bands. The Loom kills Middleton, so Tysses orders a beam out, but Maj'el stays. Janeway and the Doctor don't recall Middleton and deduce the Loom erased him from existence. Maj'el locates Zero and is cornered by the Loom, but rescued by Dal. The Loom forces them to back to the surface and destroys the Infinity. Janeway saves Wesley and the Protostar crew by firing at the Loom. The Loom attacks Voyager, so Janeway sets the shuttle weapons to their phase variance and kills one, creating a diversion. Wesley sets up a time portal. Dal risks seeing his future. Janeway arrives and finds the kids, and is shocked to see Wesley. The Protostar crew and Maj'el are sent through the portal. Wesley sends Janeway back to Voyager and wipes out the Loom. Dal, Gwyn, Rok, Zero, Jankom, Murf, and Maj'el arrive on a sandy planet with a rusty Protostar and a weathered captain, Chakotay.
Part 2
31	11	"Last Flight of the Protostar"	Ruolin Li & Andrew L. Schmidt	Diandra Pendleton-Thompson	July 1, 2024
32	12	"Last Flight of the Protostar"	Sung Shin	Alex Hanson & Aaron J. Waltke	July 1, 2024
Part 1: The kids discover that the Protostar has been marooned on Ysida for ten years with a broken Chakotay who had ejected the ship's antimatter and proto-core, leaving the Protostar running on emergency power. Hologram Janeway explains that losing his crew broke Chakotay's spirit with the disappearance of his first officer Adreek being the final straw. The crew begins attempting to help Chakotay to no avail until Dal goes missing during a storm, causing Chakotay to spring into action to find him. After evading giant eels, the crew discovers that Dal has found Adreek's body along with the antimatter that Adreek had collected to repower the ship. With his spirit restored, Chakotay finally agrees to launch the Protostar and help fix the paradox. Part 2: Chakotay reveals that the ship needs deuterium from a maelstrom on the other side of the vapor ocean before they can restore power so the crew transforms the spaceship into a makeshift sailing vessel. While crossing the ocean, Dal clashes with Chakotay, before admitting that he's questioning his purpose after seeing his future in Wesley's machine. Chakotay offers Dal some advice based on his own experiences and Dal later saves Chakotay's life after he falls into the ocean. Despite some difficulties, the crew successfully collects the deuterium, restoring power to the ship's impulse engines and warp drive, allowing the Protostar to leave Ysida. However, Voyager is 3,000 light years away, meaning that they will need to build a new proto-core before the two ships can rendezvous.
33	13	"A Tribble Called Quest"	Sean Bishop	Keith Sweet II	July 1, 2024
The crew hunts for bosonite on a planet overrun by genetically modified giant tribbles. Zero breaks their leg and learns that their body is breaking down and won't last much longer. Rok works with the Klingon scientist who accidentally created the creatures to successfully reverse the change, but Rok inadvertently creates a bribble hybrid in the process whom she adopts as a pet. With the bosonite, the crew manages to create a new proto-core and sets course for Voyager 3,000 light years away.
34	14	"Cracked Mirror"	Ruolin Li	Erin McNamara	July 1, 2024
The Protostar successfully proto-jumps to Voyager's position, only to arrive in an alternate reality where Janeway and Noum died trying to rescue Chakotay (Note: An alternate version of the events of "Into the Breach" and "Who Saves the Saviors.") and then in one where the Federation was destroyed by the living construct. (Note: An alternate version of the events of "Supernova.") The crew discovers that their jump has torn the weakened fabric of the universe and splintered Voyager into a number of different realities which also has a negative effect on Gwyn. While Rok and Zero get trapped on a Voyager commanded by Tuvix, (Note: Introduced in the Star Trek: Voyager episode "Tuvix".) the others – aside from Maj'el who is accidentally left behind – land in the Mirror Universe where they face off with Janeway and Chakotay's evil counterparts. With the Loom threatening her universe, Mirror Janeway reluctantly allows them to use her ship to emit a pulse that closes the rift. Arriving on the correct Voyager, Chakotay is finally reunited with Janeway.
35	15	"Ascension"	Sung Shin	Erin McNamara, Jennifer Muro, Diandra Pendleton-Thompson, Keith Sweet II & Aaron J. Waltke	July 1, 2024
36	16	"Ascension"	Sean Bishop	Alex Hanson	July 1, 2024
Part 1: After returning to Voyager, Zero learns from The Doctor that there is nothing that can be done for their failing corporeal body. However, The Doctor suggests upgrading Zero's new containment suit with sensory inputs so that they can continue to feel, a task that Zero asks Jankom to do. Jellico orders both ships back to Earth where Voyager's crew will be reassigned, the cadets reevaluated, and the Protostar mission taken over by the Department of Temporal Investigations. Ilthuran contacts Gwyn to reveal that Asencia has taken over Solum armed with mysterious new temporal weaponry. Asencia sends the Rev-1 to destroy Voyager and the Protostar. While the others return to the Protostar, Dal flies with Nova Squadron into battle and Zero remains behind to help The Doctor. Following a failed attack on the enemy ship, Voyager is left defenseless. Part 2: As the battle continues, the Rev-1 disables the Protostar and hits Voyager with a temporal weapon called the Incursor which threatens to age the ship to dust. Zero sacrifices their failing body to retarget the Incursor onto Maj'el's fighter, allowing Nova Squadron to lure it into destroying the Rev-1 using the Boothby Supernova. In the aftermath, Zero introduces their friends to the new containment suit that Jankom built for them and Janeway announces that Starfleet Command has ordered Voyager and the Protostar to Solum. Asencia is revealed to be holding Wesley Crusher captive, having stolen her temporal technology from his mind. Asencia tells Wesley that the battle proves that Starfleet is spread too thin to be ready for what comes next.
37	17	"Brink"	Ruolin Li	Diandra Pendleton-Thompson	July 1, 2024
With the Federation and the Vau N'Akat on the brink of war, Gwyn proposes sending the Protostar crew – who are not Starfleet personnel and thus are less likely to escalate the situation – behind enemy lines to rescue her father and find the source of Asencia's new weaponry. Joined by Maj'el, who chooses to resign from Nova Squadron, the team learns from the younger version of Asencia – who has sided with the rebellion against her older self – that Wesley Crusher is the source of Asencia's weaponry and Gwyn has them split up to rescue both. Alarmed, Wesley reveals that they have altered the course of events because Ilthuran was never meant to be rescued and would've escaped to overthrow Ascencia. Wesley had purposefully allowed himself to get caught so as to manipulate Ascencia into building the technology that they need to fix the paradox. Cornered, Dal beams Wesley and Ilthuran to Voyager, removing them from Asencia's clutches. Wesley warns Janeway that they're all in danger and he doesn't know what happens next.
38	18	"Touch of Grey"	Sung Shin	Jennifer Muro	July 1, 2024
The Doctor treats Wesley's injuries, but his Traveler powers are put out of commission for the time being, leaving Wesley struggling to adapt before Janeway reminds him that he was a great Starfleet officer first. Janeway, Chakotay, The Doctor and Wesley launch a daring rescue for the Protostar crew as Asencia tries to feed them to a captured Loom. The rescue is successful, liberating both the crew and the creature. Ilthuran urges his people to rise up against Asencia's tyranny, and Solum descends into civil war. Having been reminded that boldness isn't only for the young, Janeway agrees to help save Solum from Asencia despite intervening in the civil war violating the Prime Directive.
39	19	"Ouroboros"	Sean Bishop	Kevin & Dan Hageman & Aaron J. Waltke	July 1, 2024
40	20	"Ouroboros"	Ruolin Li	Kevin & Dan Hageman & Aaron J. Waltke	July 1, 2024
Part 1: With the Vau N'Akat in open rebellion against her, Asencia begins to launch a fleet of ships equipped with temporal weaponry at every major Federation base. Voyager and the Protostar attack the fleet to buy time as Wesley, Rok, Zero and Maj'el figure out the calculations to open the wormhole to Tars Lamora, and Dal, Gwyn, Jankom, Murf and Ilthuran beam to Solum to hijack Asencia's technology. Gwyn battles Asencia, ultimately defeating her after the other Vau N'Akat lend Gwyn their strength. Murf destroys Asencia's Drednok, allowing Dal and Jankom to open the wormhole which collapses the open rifts onto Asencia's ships, destroying them and saving the Federation. However, the Loom swarm out of the wormhole to consume reality. Part 2: The crew launches the Protostar into the wormhole, guarded by Voyager. The Doctor backs up Hologram Janeway for Chakotay. (Note: Previously seen in Star Trek: Voyager's "Living Witness.") The Protostar lands successfully on Tars Lamora, resolving the time paradox, and the Loom to returns to their dimension. Janeway leads an official first contact mission with the Vau N'Akat. Wesley tells Dal the reason the universe needs them all together hasn't happened yet; "Things yet to come, wondrous and terrible things." Wesley visits his mother and meets his little brother Jack. Chakotay takes command of Voyager as Janeway retires. The kids join Starfleet Academy, but on First Contact Day an attack on Mars changes everything: (Note: As seen in Short Treks episode "Children of Mars", and Star Trek: Picard.) Janeway is recalled to active duty at Starfleet, and has a new Protostar-class USS Prodigy commissioned as a training ship for the former Protostar crew, with field commissions to ensign. Dal cedes the captaincy to Gwyn to serve as her first officer, and Hologram Janeway joins the Prodigy crew as an Emergency Command Hologram.

== Cast and characters ==
=== Main ===
- Brett Gray as Dal R'El
- Ella Purnell as Gwyn
- Jason Mantzoukas as Jankom Pog
- Angus Imrie as Zero
- Jimmi Simpson as the Lorekeeper and Drednoks
- John Noble as Ilthuran
- Robert Beltran as Chakotay
- Kate Mulgrew as Kathryn Janeway
- Rylee Alazraqui as Rok-Tahk
- Dee Bradley Baker as Murf
- Robert Picardo as the Doctor
- Jameela Jamil as Asencia
- Wil Wheaton as Wesley Crusher

=== Recurring ===
- Jason Alexander as Noum
- Daveed Diggs as Tysess
- Sunkrish Bala as Zeph
- Bonnie Gordon as the ship computer
- Michaela Dietz as Maj'el and Grom
- Susanne Blakeslee as Kathon
- John Pirkis as Borom
- Ronny Cox as Edward Jellico

=== Notable guests ===
- Tommie Earl Jenkins as Adreek-Hu
- Erin Macdonald as Dr. Erin Macdonald
- Eric Menyuk as the Traveler
- Gates McFadden as Beverly Crusher
- Billy Campbell as Thadiun Okona
- Eric Bauza as Sool'U
- Isabel Krebs as Jack Crusher

== Production ==
=== Development ===
Star Trek franchise producer Alex Kurtzman said in January 2019 that a "kids-focused" animated Star Trek series was in development. Nickelodeon ordered two seasons of Star Trek: Prodigy in late April 2019, and Kevin and Dan Hageman were attached as showrunners. Ben Hibon was announced as director and creative lead for the series in August 2020. In February 2021, ViacomCBS announced that Prodigy would debut on the new streaming service Paramount+ along with the rest of the Star Trek Universe. Paramount+ confirmed the second season order in November, and it was revealed to consist of 20 episodes in January 2022.

In June 2023, Paramount+ canceled the series. The crew were reported to be completing work on the second season while CBS began looking for a different streaming service or network to release it on. Waltke soon confirmed that the season would be completed on schedule. In August, the Hagemans said they were confident the season would be released and active discussions were taking place. They added that work on the season was expected to be completed in December. Later in August, after gathering 33,000 signatures in a Change.org petition and raising money via GoFundMe, a group of Prodigy fans paid for a plane to fly over the offices of Amazon, Hulu, Apple, and Netflix with a "Save Star Trek: Prodigy" banner. In October, the series was picked up by Netflix and the second season was scheduled for 2024. Kurtzman attributed this to the efforts of the fans.

=== Writing ===
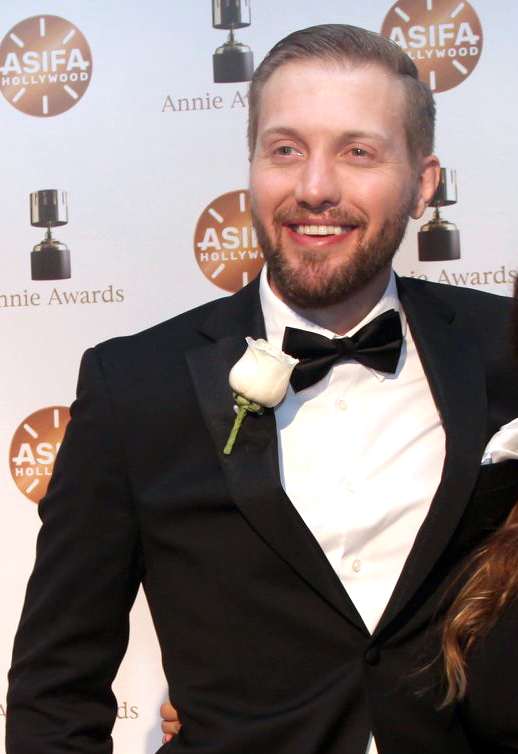
Aaron Waltke was promoted to co-head writer and co-executive producer for the second season.

The Hagemans completed writing for the last two episodes of the season by February 2022. First-season writer Aaron Waltke was promoted to co-head writer and co-executive producer for the second season, and explained that both seasons were split into two 10-episode "mini-arcs" each. He described each one as a "self-contained arc, but with plenty of story threads that you could pull to have it continue on to the next". After the young protagonists' mentor, a hologram of Kathryn Janeway, sacrificed herself at the end of the first season, the second sees them joining the crew of the real Admiral Janeway as "warrant officers in training". The Hagemans said their new mentor was an opportunity for growth, and they would not be "coddled" in the season like they were with Hologram Janeway. They also teased that Janeway and the protagonists would be on a new starship in the second season after the destruction of the USS Protostar and USS Dauntless in the first season. This was later confirmed to be the USS Voyager-A, a new version of Janeway's ship from the series Star Trek: Voyager. Dan Hageman said there were "two really big engines" in the season that were established in the first season finale: a message from Captain Chakotay in the future, and Gwyn's decision to try prevent her homeworld's future civil war.

=== Casting and voice recording ===
Kate Mulgrew reprises her role of Kathryn Janeway from Star Trek: Voyager. The voice cast for the series' young protagonists includes Brett Gray as Dal R'El, Ella Purnell as Gwyn, Jason Mantzoukas as Jankom Pog, Angus Imrie as Zero, Rylee Alazraqui as Rok-Tahk, and Dee Bradley Baker as Murf. John Noble and Jimmi Simpson also star as the Diviner and his robotic enforcer Drednok, respectively. Mulgrew revealed in January 2021 that voice recording for the second season was about to begin. Recording for the last five episodes began by July 2022.

The Hagemans said in October 2022 that the series' search for Robert Beltran's Captain Chakotay from Voyager would continue into the second season, and that other "legacy characters" from previous Star Trek series would also be included. That December, Ronny Cox—who reprised his Star Trek: The Next Generation role of Edward Jellico in the first season—said he was also probably returning for the second season. In August 2023, Robert Picardo was revealed to be reprising his role as the Doctor from Voyager in the second season. Waltke said the Doctor would have a recurring role in the second season mentoring the main characters while Janeway is busy. In June 2024, ahead of the season's release, Beltran, Cox, and Picardo were confirmed to have recurring roles in the season, along with Jason Alexander as Dr. Noum, Daveed Diggs as Commander Tysess, Jameela Jamil as Asencia—all returning from the first season—and Michaela Dietz as Maj'el.

== Marketing ==
The Hagemans released the first clip from the series at the Star Trek Las Vegas fan convention in August 2023. The clip confirmed the appearance of the USS Voyager-A and revealed Picardo's return as the Doctor. A trailer and key art were released in June 2024, ahead of the season's premiere.

== Release ==
=== Streaming and broadcast ===
The season was set to premiere on Paramount+ in late 2023, before it was canceled by the streaming service. After the series was picked up by Netflix, the season was expected to be released in 2024 on that service in the U.S. and most international territories, except for Canada and countries where SkyShowtime (a combination of Paramount+ and Peacock for some of Europe) is available. All 20 episodes were made available in France on france.tv on March 22, 2024, which surprised the Hagemans who initially described the release as a "leak". They soon clarified that the early release in France was legitimate and caused by a miscommunication. All 20 episodes of the season were released on Netflix on July 1, 2024.

=== Home media ===
The season was released for digital purchase on July 29, 2024, to allow audiences without Netflix to watch. It is scheduled for release on DVD and Blu-ray in the U.S. on November 12. The latter includes two new featurettes where the producers and Wheaton discuss the season's place in the wider Star Trek franchise, as well as the character arcs of the season and Wheaton's return to the role of Wesley Crusher.

== Reception ==
=== Critical response ===
The review aggregator website Rotten Tomatoes reported a 100% approval rating for the season, with an average rating of 8.5/10 based on 6 reviews.

=== Accolades ===
Year	Award	Category	Recipient	Result	Ref.
2025	Golden Reel Awards	Outstanding Achievement in Sound Editing – Broadcast Animation	Otis Van Osten, Aran Tanchum, Matt Klimek, Michael Wessner, and Vincent Guisetti (for "The Devourer of All Things, Part II")	Nominated	
2025	TCA Awards	Outstanding Achievement in Family Programming	Star Trek: Prodigy	Nominated	
2025	Children's and Family Emmy Awards	Outstanding Multiple Role Voice Performer in a Children's or Young Teen Program	Kate Mulgrew	Nominated	
2025	Children's and Family Emmy Awards	Outstanding Writing for an Animated Program	"The Devourer of All Things, Part I"	Nominated	
2025	Children's and Family Emmy Awards	Outstanding Individual Achievement in Animation – Background Design	Bastien Grivet	Won	
