= Latent image (disambiguation) =

A latent image on photographic film is an invisible image produced by the exposure of the film to light.

Latent image may also refer to:

- Latent image (printing), a security printing method
- "Latent Image" (Star Trek: Voyager), an episode of the TV series Star Trek: Voyager
