= Counterpoint (Star Trek: Voyager) =

- Star Trek: Voyager episode
- Episode no.: Season 5 Episode 10
- Directed by: Les Landau
- Written by: Michael Taylor
- Production code: 204
- Original air date: December 16, 1998

Guest appearances
- Mark Harelik - Kashyk; Randy Oglesby - Kir; J. Patrick McCormack - Prax; Alexander Enberg - Vorik; Randy Lowell - Torat

Episode chronology
← Previous "Thirty Days"	Next → "Latent Image"
- Star Trek: Voyager season 5

"Counterpoint" is the 104th episode of Star Trek: Voyager, the tenth episode of the fifth season. In this space science fiction television show, a spacecraft, the Federation's USS Voyager is stranded on the wrong side of the galaxy as it must slowly makes its way home to Earth. In this episode, Voyager and its crew encounter the Devore aliens, posing particularly difficult choices for the ship's captain, Starfleet Captain Kathryn Janeway.

It was aired on the United Paramount Network (UPN) on December 16, 1998.

It was written by Michael Taylor and directed by Les Landau.

The events of this episode are later referred to in the Star Trek: Prodigy season 1 episode "Supernova, Part 1" where one of the crew of the USS Dauntless reveals that she was one of the Brenari refugees that Voyager had rescued. Returning Janeway's act of kindness, the Brenari releases Janeway from the brig and trusts her word about the threat that the ship is facing while Janeway recalls the event despite several years having passed and is pleased to meet the young woman once again.

== Plot ==
Voyager is travelling through Devore space, where telepathy is illegal. The crew had encountered a small group of telepaths, and has offered them transport to a wormhole that will allow them to escape the sector. As Voyager continues, they are continually stopped by Devore ships, led by inspector Kashyk, demanding to inspect the ship for telepaths. Kashyk, who is fascinated by human culture, takes a very forward approach, taking control of the ship and playing Mahler's first symphony to "relax the crew". To hide the refugees, along with their three telepathic crew members, the crew stores their patterns in a transport buffer during the period of inspection, but this is found to ultimately have cumulative deleterious effects on the refugees.

Voyager is surprised when Kashyk arrives in a private ship, and claims to be interested in defecting and helping Voyager transport the refugees to safety. Captain Janeway is highly suspicious of Kashyk's actual motives, but allows him to help with the Brenari's approval. The Brenari point the crew towards Torat, a scientist that has studied the random appearance of the wormhole. Janeway and Kashyk work together to convince him to share the data; he tells them the wormhole appearances are random and gives them the last four locations of the wormhole and tell them to figure out where it will appear again. Janeway and Kashyk work together to try to identify the pattern, coming closer together as they make the discovery. As they work out this problem, they bond, sharing a playful yet intimate discussion. When asked why he defected, Kashyk talks about a young girl he found on an inspection and explains: “I sent her to a relocation centre with the others, knowing full well what would happen to her", indicating deep regret. As they continue deep in Devore space, Voyager passes by a large sensor array that they are unable to avoid. With their presence in the sector known, Kashyk prepares to leave the ship to meet with the incoming inspection ships to take over the inspection to ensure their success, kissing Janeway goodbye and wishing her luck.

Soon, the Devore inspectors arrive, and Kashyk takes on his former forward demeanor. He sends his inspectors out of earshot, upon which Janeway reveals the location of the wormhole. Kashyk reveals himself as a counter-agent for the Devore, and takes command of the ship. However, upon reaching the wormhole locations, he realises the sensor readings had been tricked. Janeway had never really trusted him and gave him false coordinates. When they try to rematerialise the refugees, all they find are vegetables; the refugees are on their way to the real wormhole. But if he had stayed true to her, Janeway would have really taken him with them through the wormhole. The Devore do not reach the refugees in time to stop them. Kashyk and his inspectors, unwilling to have such a failure on their records, are forced to leave the ship alone and unreported; it seems that Kashyk has accepted defeat gracefully.

== Reception ==
In 2012, Den of Geek ranked "Counterpoint" as one of the top ten episodes of Star Trek: Voyager. The romance between Janeway and Kashyk was praised by Screen Rant as one of the couples that helped the show, noting the tension between their emotions and duty to their respective morality. Screen Rant also noted that although there may have been real emotions, there was also deception.

In 2017, Business Insider listed "Counterpoint" as one of the most underrated episodes of the Star Trek franchise.

WhatCulture ranked the relationship between Janeway and Kashyk as the sixth most romantic-sexual moment of Star Trek.

In 2017, Den of Geek ranked Mark Harelik as Kashyk as the ninth best guest star on Star Trek: Voyager.

In 2017, Vulture listed this episode as one of the best of Star Trek: Voyager.

In 2020, SyFy said this was the sixth best episode of Star Trek: Voyager, but also the most underrated episode of the series. They note that it is Kate Mulgrew's favorite episode of the series, and call it an "acting showcase" for her. They point out that her character must make "hard choices" as she navigates a suspicious romance in a plot, which they describe as "The Diary of Anne Frank in space".

In 2020, io9 ranked this one of the "must watch" episodes from the series.

In 2020, The Digital Fix said this was the best episode in season five, with tense battle of wits, action and a tease of romance.

== Releases ==
On November 9, 2004, this episode was released as part of the season five DVD box set of Star Trek: Voyager. The box set includes 7 DVD optical discs with all the episodes in season 5 with some extra features, and episodes have a Dolby 5.1 Digital Audio track.

It was one of the episodes included in the anthology DVD box set Star Trek Fan Collective - Captain's Log; the set also includes episodes from other series in the franchise including Star Trek, Star Trek: The Next Generation, Star Trek: Deep Space Nine and Enterprise. The set was released on July 24, 2007 in the United States.

On April 25, 2001, this episode was released on LaserDisc in Japan, as part of the half-season collection, 5th Season Vol. 1. This included episodes from "Night" to "Bliss" on seven double sided 12 inch optical discs, with English and Japanese audio tracks for the episodes.
