= Codehunters =

- Directed by: Ben Hibon
- Written by: Ben Hibon
- Music by: Joris de Man
- Release date: 2006
- Running time: 9 minutes
- Budget: £200,000 (estimated)

Codehunters is a 2006 short film written and directed by Ben Hibon, animated by Axis Animation, with music by Joris de Man. It was commissioned by MTV Asia and shown at the MTV Music Awards.

== Plot ==
Codehunters tells the story of four heroes: Shen, Lawan, Zom and Nhi as they join forces to battle corrupt gangs, dirty cops, rampaging monsters and the tyrannical Khann in the crumbling port city of Lhek.

== Style ==
A variety of techniques were used to achieve the appearance of Hibon's 2D drawings. The use of cel shading, 2D textures to create a drawing appearance, and character outlines to keep true the pencils of the artwork.

=== Borderlands ===
Gearbox Software's 2009 video game Borderlands uses an art style that resembles Codehunters. Hibon told Forbes:

I was contacted by Gearbox prior to the re-design of the game – in 2008. They asked me if I would be interested to direct/design some cut-scenes for them. We exchanged a few emails but the project didn't materialize in the end. I didn't think much of it at the time – until I saw the final game in 2009.

To be absolutely clear – I have never created or designed anything for Gearbox or Borderlands. Gearbox saw my work and decided to reproduce it – make it their own – without my help or my consent. The hardest part for me when this happened was understanding why they wouldn't ask me directly. We were already talking about doing some work together – it made no sense.

When asked by Kotaku about the similarity between Borderlands and Codehunters, Gearbox' CEO Randy Pitchford confirmed that "artists and designers at Gearbox were inspired and influenced by it". Earlier in the game's development, Gearbox had used a more generic science fiction art style, before changing to the final cel-shaded style.

== Reception ==
The film has received positive reception with praise going towards the artstyle, animation, and music. It has been viewed over 400 million times.
