= Latent Image (Star Trek: Voyager) =

- Star Trek: Voyager episode
- Episode no.: Season 5 Episode 11
- Directed by: Mike Vejar
- Story by: Eileen Connors; Brannon Braga; Joe Menosky
- Teleplay by: Joe Menosky
- Cinematography by: Marvin V. Rush
- Production code: 206
- Original air date: January 20, 1999

Guest appearances
- Nancy Bell - Ensign Jetal; Scarlett Pomers - Naomi Wildman

Episode chronology
← Previous "Counterpoint"	Next → "Bride of Chaotica!"
- Star Trek: Voyager season 5

"Latent Image" is the 105th episode of the American science fiction television series Star Trek: Voyager airing on the UPN network, the 11th episode of the fifth season. In this episode the ship's holographic artificial intelligence medical program, The Doctor (Robert Picardo), finds something wrong in his program's memory.

This episode originally aired on UPN on January 20, 1999.

== Plot ==
During a routine medical examination, the Doctor discovers evidence that Ensign Harry Kim has undergone complex brain surgery within the last two years which only the Doctor could have performed. Having no memory of the procedure, the Doctor attempts to reconstruct the missing time period and discovers that certain files in his memory were deleted. A reconstruction reveals photos of an Ensign Ahni Jetal, a woman of whom he has no recollection.

The Doctor eventually discovers that Captain Janeway and the crew conspired to eliminate files concerning a traumatic event that caused a holographic equivalent of a psychotic break. After an attack during an away mission, the Doctor could only treat one of two equally critically injured patients: Ensign Jetal and Ensign Harry Kim. The Doctor saved Harry, while Jetal died on the operating table. As time passed, the Doctor was overpowered by guilt, believing his friendship with Harry affected his decision to save him rather than Jetal. A conflict then developed within his ethical programming that compromised his impartiality.

On having the previously deleted files reinstalled, the Doctor's mental stability once again deteriorates, and Janeway is faced with deleting his memories or allowing the Doctor time to resolve his guilt, a decision that could leave the crew without a medic in the interim. Seven of Nine argues to Janeway that, much as she herself did, the Doctor's personal development has advanced to where he deserves an opportunity to evolve beyond his program's original constraints. Janeway allows the Doctor to retain his memories so he can eventually reconcile with his past actions.

In the final scene, the Doctor reads from La Vita Nuova. The words differ from the actual poem to make them more applicable to the story and give a more profound sense of closure: "In that book, which is my memory, on the first page of the chapter that is the day when I first met you appear the words, 'here begins a new life'".

== Actor commentary ==
Robert Picardo said that this is not only his favorite Voyager episode, but also the most important in the development of the Doctor's character.

== Reception ==
In 2012, Den of Geek ranked "Latent Image" as one of the top ten episodes of Star Trek: Voyager.

In 2020, SyFy ranked this the 5th best episode of Star Trek: Voyager, commending it as a "powerful drama" that mixed a whodunnit with a medical storyline.

As of 2025, "Latent Image" ranks as the 18th most popular, user-rated Voyager episode on IMDb with a weighted score of 8.3 out of 10.

== Releases ==
On November 9, 2004, this episode was released as part of the season 5 DVD box set of Star Trek: Voyager. The box set includes 7 DVD optical discs with all the episodes in season 5 with some extra features, and episodes have a Dolby 5.1 Digital Audio track.

On April 25, 2001, this episode was released on LaserDisc in Japan, as part of the half-season collection, 5th Season vol.1 . This included episodes from "Night" to "Bliss" on seven double sided 12 inch optical discs, with English and Japanese audio tracks for the episodes.

== See also ==
- Medical ethics
- Sophie's Choice (novel)
- La Vita Nuova (The EMH excerpts from this at the end of the episode)
