= Erin Macdonald =

American astrophysicist and aerospace engineer

Erin Patricia Macdonald
- Macdonald at Dragon Con in 2026
- Education: B.A., Physics with Astrophysics; B.A., Mathematics; Ph.D., Astrophysics
- Alma mater: University of Colorado Boulder; University of Glasgow
- Known for: Science communication Science fiction consultation
- Scientific career
- Fields: Astrophysics; Gravitational waves Aerospace engineering
- Workplaces: SAIC
- Thesis: From Upper Limits to Detection: Continuous Gravitational Waves in the Advanced Detector Era (2012)
- Doctoral advisors: Graham Woan; Ik Siong Heng
- Website: www.erinpmacdonald.com

Erin Macdonald is an astrophysicist, aerospace engineer, and science fiction consultant. She hosts the YouTube channel Dr. Erin Explains the Universe, teaches STEM through popular culture, and consults with science fiction creators.

== Education and early career ==
Macdonald credits fictional characters such as Dana Scully and Kathryn Janeway (the latter of whom she even acknowledges in her Ph.D. dissertation) with providing the inspiration to pursue a science career. She earned her bachelor's degrees in astrophysics and mathematics at the University of Colorado Boulder (after transferring there from the University of New Mexico) and her Ph.D. at the University of Glasgow, where she concentrated in general relativity.

Macdonald did post-doctoral work with the Laser Interferometer Gravitational-Wave Observatory (LIGO) collaboration as part of an attempt to detect gravitational waves from the Crab Pulsar. She also did post-doctoral work at Cardiff University, still with LIGO, where she was the first female researcher in her department. During this period she became involved with the Actors Workshop, in Cardiff, which she credits with helping her efforts at science communication. Macdonald's first job after leaving academia was at the Denver Museum of Nature and Science. She also began teaching at local community colleges and eventually found work analyzing data in the aerospace industry.

== Science communication ==
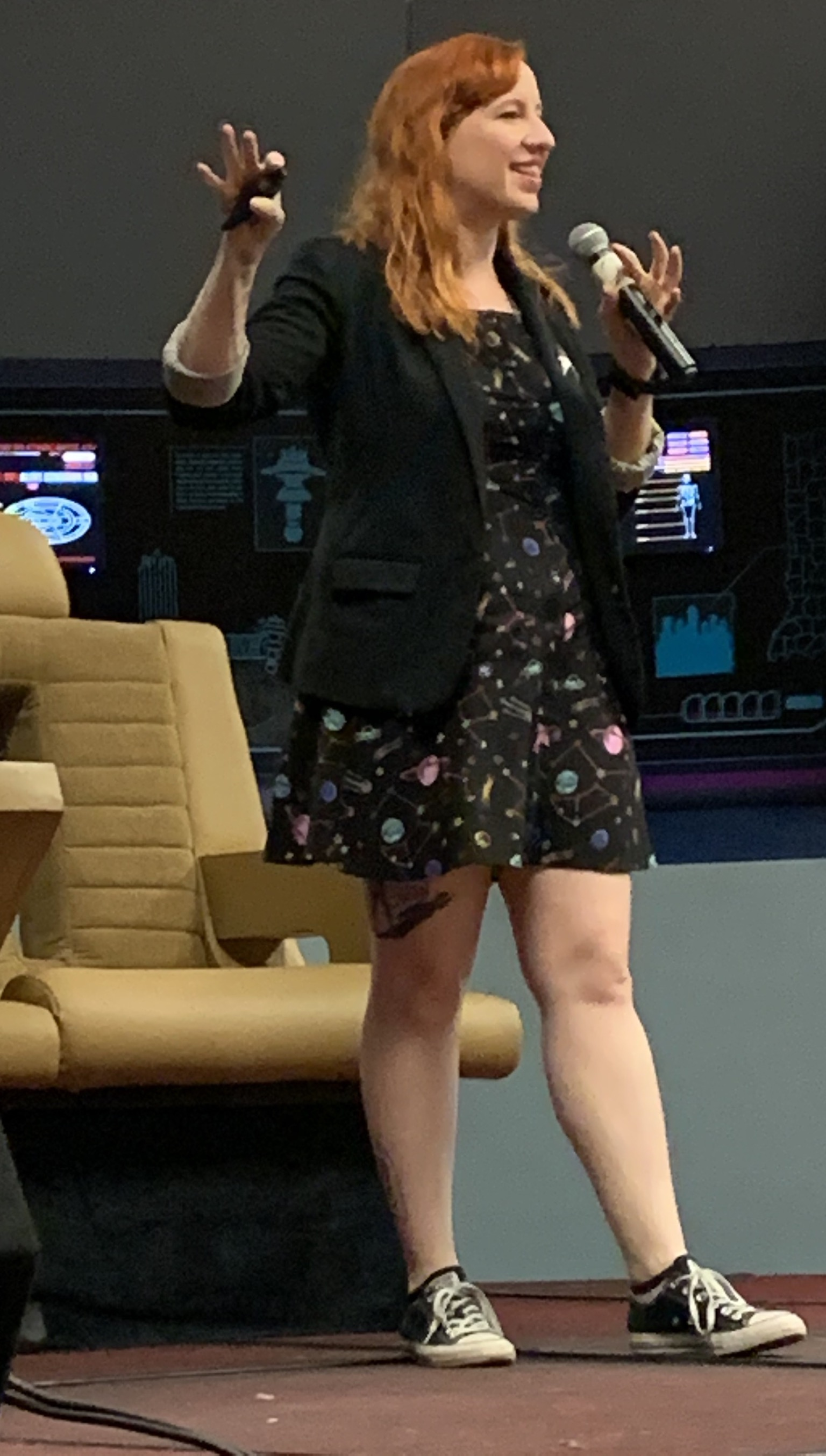
Macdonald at Starbase Indy 2019

While searching for a better work-life balance than that provided in research and academia, Macdonald found opportunities to still teach through a combination of conducting introductory courses and speaking at science fiction conventions. She discovered that these activities put her “in front of students and kids who may find inspiration in a punk-redhead woman covered in tattoos who also happens to have a PhD.” After deciding not to pursue an academic research career, Macdonald began giving talks at science fiction conventions in the areas of her expertise that link the science to the various fandoms of her audience members. For example, she has used Voltron: Legendary Defender to teach about spacetime. She has made appearances at such conventions as Awesome Con and Dragon Con. This led her to meeting and working with science fiction writers in the entertainment industry.

== Science fiction consultation ==
Macdonald moved to Los Angeles from Colorado and works with writers and producers in Hollywood to bring scientific accuracy to their productions. She has, for example, served as technical consultant on several episodes of Orbital Redux. In 2019, Macdonald produced a Great Courses course on the science of science fiction via Audible.

In late 2019, Macdonald became a science consultant for Star Trek. She works with producers and writers throughout the Star Trek franchise. She also had cameo appearances in the first and second seasons of Star Trek: Prodigy, as well as in a 2023 Star Trek Online update titled Incursion, dubbing her in-universe namesake character "Dr. Erin Macdonald".
