= Star Trek: Prodigy =

American animated TV series (2021–2024)

- Genre: Adventure; Drama; Science fiction
- Created by: Kevin Hageman; Dan Hageman
- Based on: Star Trek by Gene Roddenberry
- Showrunners: Kevin Hageman; Dan Hageman
- Voices of: Brett Gray; Ella Purnell; Jason Mantzoukas; Angus Imrie; Rylee Alazraqui; Dee Bradley Baker; Jimmi Simpson; John Noble; Kate Mulgrew; Robert Beltran; Robert Picardo; Jameela Jamil; Wil Wheaton
- Theme music composer: Michael Giacchino
- Composer: Nami Melumad
- Country of origin: United States
- Original language: English
- No. of seasons: 2
- No. of episodes: 40

Production
- Executive producers: Ben Hibon; Kevin Hageman; Dan Hageman; Rod Roddenberry; Trevor Roth; Katie Krentz; Aaron Baiers; Heather Kadin; Alex Kurtzman
- Producers: MacGregor Middleton; Robyn Johnson
- Running time: 23–24 minutes
- Production companies: Secret Hideout; Roddenberry Entertainment; Brothers Hageman Productions; Nickelodeon Animation Studio; CBS Eye Animation Productions

Original release
- Network: Paramount+
- Release: October 28, 2021 – December 29, 2022
- Network: Netflix
- Release: July 1, 2024

Related
- Star Trek TV series

Star Trek: Prodigy is an American animated science fiction television series created by Kevin and Dan Hageman. It is the tenth Star Trek series and was released from 2021 to 2024 as part of executive producer Alex Kurtzman's expanded Star Trek Universe. Prodigy is the first Star Trek series to specifically target a younger audience, and the franchise's first solely 3D animated series. It follows a group of young aliens in the 24th century who find the abandoned starship Protostar and learn about Starfleet.

Brett Gray, Ella Purnell, Jason Mantzoukas, Angus Imrie, Rylee Alazraqui, and Dee Bradley Baker voice the young crew of the Protostar, with Jimmi Simpson, John Noble, Kate Mulgrew, Robert Beltran, Robert Picardo, Jameela Jamil, and Wil Wheaton also providing voices for the series. Kurtzman first mentioned a youth-focused animated series in January 2019 and it was confirmed a month later. The Hageman brothers were set as creators and showrunners, and Nickelodeon ordered two seasons of Prodigy that April, to be released on the cable channel after streaming on Paramount+ first. Ben Hibon was announced as director and creative lead in August 2020. The series was produced by CBS Eye Animation Productions and Nickelodeon Animation Studio in association with Secret Hideout, Roddenberry Entertainment, and Brothers Hageman Productions.

Star Trek: Prodigy premiered on Paramount+ on October 28, 2021, and began airing on Nickelodeon on December 17. The 20-episode first season ended in December 2022. Work had already commenced on the second season when the series was canceled and removed from Paramount+ in June 2023. Netflix picked up the series that October and released the first season for streaming in December 2023. The second season was released in France on france.tv in March 2024, and was released on Netflix that July. The series received positive reviews from critics and won two Children's and Family Emmy Awards. Despite the showrunner's plans for more seasons, Netflix decided not to continue the series.

== Premise ==
In 2383, five years after the USS Voyager returned to Earth at the end of Star Trek: Voyager, a motley crew of young aliens find an abandoned Starfleet ship, the USS Protostar, in the Tars Lamora prison colony. Taking control of the ship, they must learn to work together as they make their way from the Delta Quadrant to the Alpha Quadrant. At the start of the second season, they join Admiral Kathryn Janeway as warrant officers aboard the USS Voyager-A on a mission to find the original crew of the Protostar.

== Cast and characters ==
- Brett Gray as Dal R'El:
  A 17-year-old "maverick" of unknown species who takes the role of captain on the USS Protostar. Dal later learns that he is an augmented human with DNA from multiple alien species.
- Ella Purnell as Gwyndala:
  A 17-year-old Vau N'Akat nicknamed "Gwyn" who dreamed of exploring the stars while growing up on her father's prison asteroid. A talented linguist, she has learned many alien languages.
- Jason Mantzoukas as Jankom Pog:
  An argumentative 16-year-old Tellarite. Having been born before the Tellarites joined the Federation, he awoke on a long-range sleeper ship. He handles repair duties on the Protostar.
- Angus Imrie as Zero:
  A Medusan—a noncorporeal, genderless, energy-based lifeform—who wears a containment suit to stop others from going mad at the sight of them.
- Rylee Alazraqui as Rok-Tahk:
  A shy, 8-year-old Brikar. Despite being large and strong, she defies being typecast as the ship's security officer and instead develops an interest in science.
- Dee Bradley Baker as Murf:
  An apparently indestructible Mellanoid slime worm with good timing and an appetite for ship parts. The character was initially added as a joke, with Dal arriving to find a "semi-sentient blob" had joined the crew, but the writers soon fell in love with the idea of having a "dog-type character" in the series that children would enjoy. In the second half of the first season, the writers gave Murf a character arc beyond "just eating things", with the character evolving to have a more humanoid form.
- Jimmi Simpson as the Drednok:
  The Diviner's and the Vindicator's deadly robotic enforcers. Co-showrunner Kevin Hageman said the robot was "very still, and silent, and soft-spoken", which contrasted with the more driven personality of the Diviner. Simpson described Drednok as a more verbose version of the character Maximilian from the film The Black Hole (1979).
- John Noble as the Diviner / Ilthuran:
  Gwyn's father and a ruthless tyrant who controls the asteroid Tars Lamora and searches for the Protostar. The character, and Noble's performance, were inspired by Ricardo Montalbán's Star Trek villain Khan Noonien Singh. The character initially just appears floating in a tank, which was inspired by the floating Guild Navigator creature from David Lynch's Dune (1984). The second season includes a younger version of the character who uses the name Ilthuran.
- Kate Mulgrew as Kathryn Janeway:
  In the first season, Mulgrew primarily voices the Protostar's Emergency Training Holographic Advisor which is based on the likeness of Janeway, the former captain of the USS Voyager. She also voices the real Janeway, now a Starfleet Vice Admiral who commands the USS Dauntless in the first season and the USS Voyager-A in the second.
- Robert Beltran as Chakotay : The original captain of the Protostar and Janeway's former first officer, stranded through time travel on the Vau N'Akat homeworld.
- Robert Picardo as the Doctor (season 2): An Emergency Medical Hologram onboard Voyager.
- Jameela Jamil as Asencia : A member of the Vau N'Akat, also known as the Vindicator, who seeks to instigate a war between the Vau N'Akat and the Federation.
- Wil Wheaton as Wesley Crusher (season 2): A former Starfleet officer who is now a Traveler with power over time, space, and thought.

== Episodes ==
Seasons of Star Trek: Prodigy
Season	Episodes		Originally released		
Season	Episodes		First released	Last released	Network
1	20	10	October 28, 2021	February 3, 2022	Paramount+
1	20	10	October 27, 2022	December 29, 2022	Paramount+
2	20		July 1, 2024		Netflix (Note: The full second season was first released in France on france.tv on March 22, 2024.)

=== Season 1 (2021–22) ===
No. overall	No. in season	Title	Directed by	Written by	Original release date
Part 1
1	1	"Lost and Found"	Ben Hibon	Kevin & Dan Hageman	October 28, 2021
2	2	"Lost and Found"	Ben Hibon	Kevin & Dan Hageman	October 28, 2021
3	3	"Starstruck"	Alan Wan	Chad Quandt	November 4, 2021
4	4	"Dream Catcher"	Steve Ahn & Sung Shin	Lisa Schultz Boyd	November 11, 2021
5	5	"Terror Firma"	Alan Wan & Olga Ulanova	Julie & Shawna Benson	November 18, 2021
6	6	"Kobayashi"	Alan Wan	Aaron J. Waltke	January 6, 2022
7	7	"First Con-tact"	Steve Ahn & Sung Shin	Diandra Pendleton-Thompson	January 13, 2022
8	8	"Time Amok"	Olga Ulanova & Sung Shin	Nikhil S. Jayaram	January 20, 2022
9	9	"A Moral Star"	Ben Hibon	Kevin & Dan Hageman, Julie & Shawna Benson, Lisa Schultz Boyd, Nikhil S. Jayaram, Diandra Pendleton-Thompson, Chad Quandt & Aaron J. Waltke	January 27, 2022
10	10	"A Moral Star"	Ben Hibon	Kevin & Dan Hageman, Julie & Shawna Benson, Lisa Schultz Boyd, Nikhil S. Jayaram, Diandra Pendleton-Thompson, Chad Quandt & Aaron J. Waltke	February 3, 2022
Part 2
11	11	"Asylum"	Steve Ahn & Sung Shin	Kevin & Dan Hageman	October 27, 2022
12	12	"Let Sleeping Borg Lie"	Olga Ulanova & Sung Shin	Diandra Pendleton-Thompson	November 3, 2022
13	13	"All the World's a Stage"	Andrew L. Schmidt	Aaron J. Waltke	November 10, 2022
14	14	"Crossroads"	Steve Ahn & Sung Shin	Lisa Schultz Boyd	November 17, 2022
15	15	"Masquerade"	Sung Shin	Nikhil S. Jayaram	November 24, 2022
16	16	"Preludes"	Steve Ahn & Sung Shin	Julie & Shawna Benson, Kevin & Dan Hageman, Nikhil S. Jayaram, Diandra Pendleton-Thompson, Chad Quandt, Lisa Schultz Boyd & Aaron J. Waltke	December 1, 2022
17	17	"Ghost in the Machine"	Andrew L. Schmidt	Chad Quandt	December 8, 2022
18	18	"Mindwalk"	Sung Shin	Julie & Shawna Benson	December 15, 2022
19	19	"Supernova"	Andrew L. Schmidt	Erin McNamara	December 22, 2022
20	20	"Supernova"	Ben Hibon	Kevin & Dan Hageman	December 29, 2022

=== Season 2 (2024) ===
No. overall	No. in season	Title	Directed by	Written by	Original U.S. release date
Part 1
21	1	"Into the Breach"	Ben Hibon	Kevin & Dan Hageman	July 1, 2024
22	2	"Into the Breach"	Andrew L. Schmidt & Patrick Krebs	Aaron J. Waltke	July 1, 2024
23	3	"Who Saves the Saviors"	Sung Shin	Erin McNamara	July 1, 2024
24	4	"Temporal Mechanics 101"	Ben Hibon	Keith Sweet II	July 1, 2024
25	5	"Observer's Paradox"	Ruolin Li & Andrew L. Schmidt	Jennifer Muro	July 1, 2024
26	6	"Imposter Syndrome"	Sung Shin	Jennifer Muro	July 1, 2024
27	7	"The Fast and the Curious"	Sung Shin & Sean Bishop	Erin McNamara	July 1, 2024
28	8	"Is There in Beauty No Truth?"	Ruolin Li & Andrew L. Schmidt	Keith Sweet II	July 1, 2024
29	9	"The Devourer of All Things"	Sung Shin	Jennifer Muro	July 1, 2024
30	10	"The Devourer of All Things"	Sean Bishop	Aaron J. Waltke	July 1, 2024
Part 2
31	11	"Last Flight of the Protostar"	Ruolin Li & Andrew L. Schmidt	Diandra Pendleton-Thompson	July 1, 2024
32	12	"Last Flight of the Protostar"	Sung Shin	Alex Hanson & Aaron J. Waltke	July 1, 2024
33	13	"A Tribble Called Quest"	Sean Bishop	Keith Sweet II	July 1, 2024
34	14	"Cracked Mirror"	Ruolin Li	Erin McNamara	July 1, 2024
35	15	"Ascension"	Sung Shin	Erin McNamara, Jennifer Muro, Diandra Pendleton-Thompson, Keith Sweet II & Aaron J. Waltke	July 1, 2024
36	16	"Ascension"	Sean Bishop	Alex Hanson	July 1, 2024
37	17	"Brink"	Ruolin Li	Diandra Pendleton-Thompson	July 1, 2024
38	18	"Touch of Grey"	Sung Shin	Jennifer Muro	July 1, 2024
39	19	"Ouroboros"	Sean Bishop	Kevin & Dan Hageman & Aaron J. Waltke	July 1, 2024
40	20	"Ouroboros"	Ruolin Li	Kevin & Dan Hageman & Aaron J. Waltke	July 1, 2024

== Production ==
=== Development ===
In June 2018, after becoming sole showrunner of the series Star Trek: Discovery, Alex Kurtzman signed a five-year overall deal with CBS Television Studios to expand the Star Trek franchise beyond Discovery to several new series, miniseries, and animated series. After the announcement of adult animated comedy Star Trek: Lower Decks, Kurtzman said in January 2019 that there would be at least one more animated series released as part of his expansion. This would be a "kids-focused" series that could potentially be released on a different network from the more adult-focused streaming service CBS All Access (later rebranded Paramount+) where the other Star Trek series under Kurtzman were being released. Kurtzman said other animated series would be different from Lower Decks in both tone and visual style. The latter could potentially be achieved through different technology.

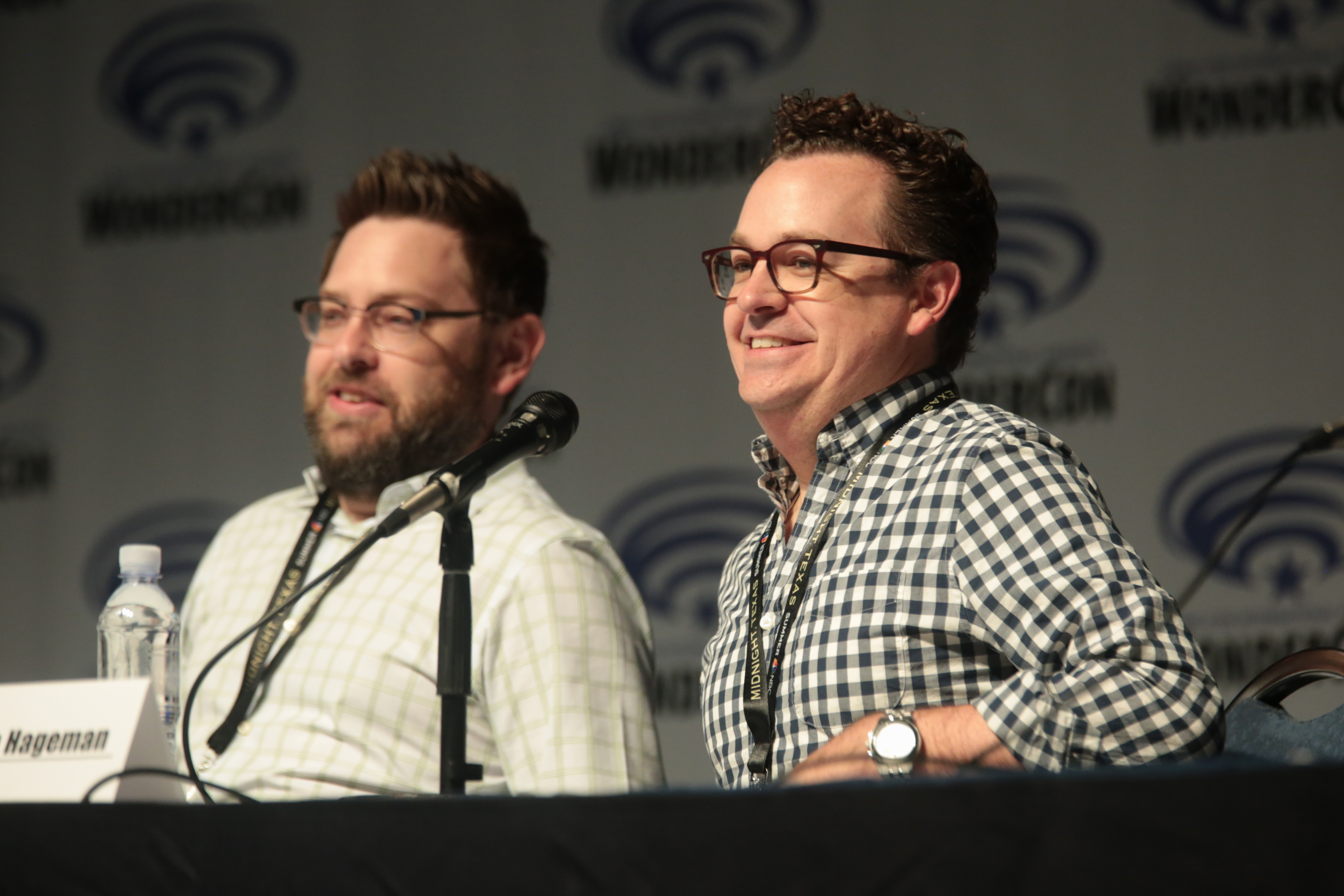
Creators and showrunners Dan and Kevin Hageman

Kevin and Dan Hageman joined the series as writers by mid-February 2019, when Nickelodeon was in talks to air the show since its viewers match the series' younger target audience. The project was expected to be a "major tentpole series" for the network under its new president Brian Robbins. A month later, Kurtzman confirmed the project and said negotiations with Nickelodeon were almost complete. He expected the series to be ready for release in 2021 or 2022. Nickelodeon officially ordered the series in late April 2019 and the Hageman brothers were confirmed to be writing and executive producing the series alongside Kurtzman, Secret Hideout's Heather Kadin, Rod Roddenberry (the son of Star Trek creator Gene Roddenberry) and Trevor Roth of Roddenberry Entertainment, and CBS Television's animation executive Katie Krentz. Kadin revealed in October 2019 that Nickelodeon had ordered two seasons of the series due to the animation work that was required. She also explained that the Hagemans were hired due to their work on previous children's series that did not play down to the audience and were still watchable for older viewers. She felt older Star Trek fans would be able to watch the series with their children to introduce them to the franchise.

In an article on the Star Trek franchise in January 2020, The Wall Street Journal listed the series as Star Trek: Prodigy. This title was officially confirmed in July, along with a 2021 release date. Ramsey Naito was overseeing the series for Nickelodeon as EVP of Animation Production and Development. Ben Hibon was announced as director, co-executive producer, and creative lead for the series in August 2020. Naito described Hibon as "an incredible storyteller and a world builder with a distinct vision" for the series. In February 2021, ViacomCBS announced that Prodigy would debut on the streaming service Paramount+ along with the rest of the Star Trek Universe. Paramount+'s EVP of development and programming, Julie McNamara, said they would have the "best of both worlds" with this move by introducing the series to fans of the other Star Trek series on the service before bringing it to new audiences on Nickelodeon. She added that viewership data from CBS All Access showed that fans of Star Trek also watched the animated series The Legend of Korra on the service, and this was another factor in deciding to add Prodigy to Paramount+. At that time, the first season was revealed to have 20 episodes.

A 20-episode second season was officially confirmed by Paramount+ in November 2021. First-season writer Aaron Waltke was promoted to co-head writer and co-executive producer of the second season. A year later, Waltke said he had discussed continuing the series beyond the first two seasons with the Hagemans and they hoped it could run for seven seasons before expanding to films; Kevin Hageman elaborated that he thought the Star Trek franchise could use an "epic animated film series that have a new adventure every couple of years that the whole family can go see". In June 2023, Paramount+ canceled several original series and removed them from the streaming service in exchange for a "content impairment charge". This included Star Trek: Prodigy, and came as part of wider cost-cutting changes being made by many streaming services. The series was also not expected to return to Nickelodeon. The crew continued work on the second season while CBS searched for a different streaming service or network to release it. In October 2023, the series was picked up by Netflix.

In June 2024, the Hagemans expressed their hope that the audience on Netflix would be big enough for the service to order a third season, though they felt this was unlikely. They were also still open to continuing the series through a film franchise. By May 2025, Netflix decided to let the license for the series expire. The Hagemans said the series' removal from the streaming service was "disconcerting" but it was not due to "lack of viewership or anything nefarious". They remained hopeful that another service would pick up the series so it could continue, saying "the next generation of Trek fans deserve it". No work on a third season had begun by that July, and it was considered unlikely by TVLine's Matt Webb Mitovich who pointed to Netflix's decision to let the license expire and Paramount Global Content Distribution's marketing of the second season as the "final season".

=== Writing ===
"We never really view it as a kid show. We view it as a show for people who don't know Star Trek, which could be young or old... We wanted to keep the stakes real for an older audience. We never want to dumb things down for kids. Kids are really smart. They may have a learning curve in the show, but they'll get there."

— Co-showrunner Dan Hageman on making Star Trek for younger audiences

The Hageman brothers announced the series' writers room in July 2019, which included Julie and Shawna Benson, Diandra Pendleton-Thompson, Chad Quandt, Aaron Waltke, Lisa Shultz Boyd, Nikhil Jayaram, Erin McNamara, and Keith Sweet. Star Trek author David Mack served as a consultant and adviser on the series. Astrophysicist Erin Macdonald also served as a consultant on the series after being hired as a general science advisor for the Star Trek franchise. She worked in the writers room, and unlike the other Star Trek series—for which she focused on scientific accuracy—her role on Prodigy was focused on STEM education for the series' younger target audience.

The series features a group of young aliens from the distant Delta Quadrant who learn about Starfleet and its ideals, which introduces Star Trek concepts to new, young audiences. Kevin Hageman felt young viewers may not be able to identify with the "fully formed officers" who star in most Star Trek series, so Prodigy starring younger characters also helped with the target audience being engaged. Waltke explained that the first two seasons were written to tell one continuous story across four 10-episode "mini-arcs". He said the series would change in tone each season as the characters grow up because the writers saw the series as a story about young people joining Starfleet and moving up the ranks. Waltke also said the series would not ignore the events of other Star Trek projects set during the 2380s, including the concurrent series Lower Decks and Star Trek: Picard. The writers worked with the showrunners of the other series to ensure continuity.

=== Casting ===
During New York Comic Con in October 2020, Kate Mulgrew was announced to be reprising her role of Kathryn Janeway from Star Trek: Voyager. Further casting for the series was expected to be revealed in the following months. Kurtzman said bringing Mulgrew back was part of the Hagemans' initial pitch, and he felt their reasoning was compelling enough to meet his requirements that "legacy characters" like Janeway only be revisited for a specific reason. The production had approached Mulgrew about starring in the series a year before the official announcement, and Kurtzman was surprised that her involvement had not leaked during that time. Mulgrew was initially reluctant to join the series, but after several months of negotiations she was convinced to reprise her role by the idea of introducing Star Trek to a new generation of fans. The series' version of Janeway is a hologram aboard the USS Protostar that is based on the original character's likeness, though the actual Janeway also appears. The hologram Janeway helps train the series' bridge crew of six young misfits, who are all aliens rather than humans in a first for the Star Trek franchise. The main voice cast was announced in June 2021, including Rylee Alazraqui as Rok-Tahk, Brett Gray as Dal, Angus Imrie as Zero, Jason Mantzoukas as Jankom Pog, Ella Purnell as Gwyn, and Dee Bradley Baker as Murf. At the end of August, John Noble was announced as voicing Gwyn's father, the Diviner, with Jimmi Simpson cast as the Diviner's robotic enforcer Drednok.

=== Animation ===
When the series was announced, Kurtzman expected it would take around a year for each season's animation work to be completed. During their initial discussions when Hibon first joined the project, the Hagemans said that they wanted to create an "epic" scope without losing the characters and emotion. Using computer-generated animation was the logical choice for Hibon, as he felt it would give the production all the tools they needed to create a cinematic series that was on-par with the live-action entries in the franchise. Using CG animation also differentiated Prodigy from the previous Star Trek animated series, Star Trek: The Animated Series and Lower Decks. The series' design style was first developed through 2D drawings before being animated with 3D CG animation, and Kurtzman compared it to the animated anthology series Love, Death & Robots in terms of "beauty and lighting and cinema". Kadin further compared the style to the Hagemans' previous work on the animated series Ninjago and Trollhunters, while Kurtzman said the series' animation was feature film-quality and would hold up if projected in cinemas. In August 2020, Kurtzman said work on the series' animation was "barreling ahead, full steam ahead" in contrast to the live-action Star Trek series that had been delayed by the COVID-19 pandemic.

The series' designers tried to make the initial designs feel more grounded than previous Star Trek series. Their intention was to integrate more of the "classic language" of Star Trek designs into Prodigy as the main characters move closer to the Federation and Starfleet. The Protostar, the central ship of the series, has a similar design to the USS Voyager. The series' opening title sequence follows the Protostar through various spatial anomalies, planets, and debris fields that form into images of the main cast.

=== Music ===
External videos
- Star Trek: Prodigy opening credits presents the series' title sequence with main theme composed by Michael Giacchino, Twitter video from the "Star Trek on Paramount+" channel

In August 2020, Kurtzman said Nami Melumad had been hired to compose the music for a new Star Trek series after impressing with her work on the Star Trek: Short Treks short "Q&A". He did not reveal which series she had been hired for, but it was believed that this could be Prodigy based on Melumad's Twitter activity. She was confirmed to be composing for the series in October. The main theme was composed by Michael Giacchino, who supervised Melumad's Short Treks work and also composed the music for the Kelvin Timeline Star Trek films. Melumad was comfortable working with Giacchino's theme after their previous work together, and because her style was influenced by his.

Melumad was the first woman to compose the music for a Star Trek series, which she said was "a huge honor, and [a] great responsibility". When she first joined the project, the showrunners sent her a Spotify playlist with music that they listened to while developing the series, which included Giacchino's score for the film John Carter (2012). Giacchino's advice to Melumad was to not overuse the series' main theme or the original Star Trek theme by Alexander Courage, so they would feel earned when they do get used. She settled on using the main theme only in the most triumphant moments for the main characters. Melumad composed several other themes, including for each of the main characters. To represent Jankom, Melumad used the trombone and "a little bit of a clumsy" melody. Zero's theme uses a piccolo, while Gwyn's features a "keyboard-y kind of bell tone sound". Melumad did not reprise Jerry Goldsmith's main theme from Star Trek: Voyager to represent Hologram Janeway, since the character represents Starfleet in general within the series and because she felt the young target audience would not recognize the theme anyway. She did say that the music becomes "more Star Trek-y" as the series goes on.

== Marketing ==
The title and logo were revealed at the virtual Star Trek Universe panel during the July 2020 Comic-Con@Home convention, while Mulgrew's casting was announced at another virtual Star Trek Universe panel for New York Comic Con in October 2020. A first look at the main characters was released during the February 2021 ViacomCBS Investor Day, and a first look at Hologram Janeway was revealed during the "First Contact Day" virtual event on April 5, 2021, celebrating the fictional holiday marking first contact between humans and aliens in the Star Trek universe. At the Television Critics Association press tour in August 2021, the opening title sequence was revealed along with Giacchino's main theme. After being the dominant producer of Star Trek collectible figures in the 1990s, Playmates Toys returned to the franchise in 2022 with new figures based on Prodigy. To promote the series' Nickelodeon debut, the family-friendly, space-themed interactive experience at CAMP Experience in Brooklyn, New York, was redressed to be Prodigy-themed from July 22 to August 29, 2022.

== Release ==
Home media releases for Star Trek: Prodigy
Season	Home media release dates		
Season	Region 1	Region 2	Region 4
1A	January 3, 2023	September 25, 2023	November 6, 2024
1B	September 26, 2023	September 25, 2023	November 6, 2024
2	November 12, 2024	November 11, 2024	TBA

Star Trek: Prodigy premiered on the streaming service Paramount+ on October 28, 2021, and on the cable channel Nickelodeon on December 17. The first season was broadcast in Canada on CTV Sci-Fi Channel, and was released in other countries as Paramount+ was made available to them. The season was removed from Paramount+ when the series was canceled in June 2023.

In October 2023, Netflix picked up the series for streaming in the U.S. and most international territories. Excluded were Canada, where the series would remain on CTV.ca and the CTV App, and European countries where SkyShowtime (a combination of Paramount+ and Peacock) was available. The first season was released on Netflix in December 2023. The second season was made available in France on france.tv on March 22, 2024, before it was released on Netflix on July 1. After Netflix decided to let the license for the series expire, the first season was removed from the service on June 24, 2025. The second season was removed on December 31.

== Reception ==
=== Critical response ===
The review aggregator website Rotten Tomatoes reported a 94% approval rating for the first season, with an average rating of 8.1/10 based on 18 reviews. Metacritic gave it a weighted average score of 68 out of 100 based on reviews from 5 critics, indicating "generally favorable reviews". For the second season, Rotten Tomatoes reported a 100% approval rating with an average rating of 8.5/10 based on 6 reviews.

=== Accolades ===
Year	Award	Category	Recipient	Result	Ref.
2022	Children's and Family Emmy Awards	Outstanding Animated Series	Star Trek: Prodigy	Nominated	
2022	Children's and Family Emmy Awards	Outstanding Individual Achievement in Animation – Production Design	Alessandro Taini	Won	
2023	TCA Awards	Outstanding Achievement in Family Programming	Star Trek: Prodigy	Nominated	
2023	Tell-Tale TV Awards	Favorite Animated Series	Star Trek: Prodigy	Won	
2023	Children's and Family Emmy Awards	Outstanding Sound Mixing and Sound Editing for an Animated Program	Star Trek: Prodigy	Nominated	
2025	Golden Reel Awards	Outstanding Achievement in Sound Editing – Broadcast Animation	Otis Van Osten, Aran Tanchum, Matt Klimek, Michael Wessner, and Vincent Guisetti (for "The Devourer of All Things, Part II")	Nominated	
2025	TCA Awards	Outstanding Achievement in Family Programming	Star Trek: Prodigy	Nominated	
2025	Children's and Family Emmy Awards	Outstanding Multiple Role Voice Performer in a Children's or Young Teen Program	Kate Mulgrew	Nominated	
2025	Children's and Family Emmy Awards	Outstanding Writing for an Animated Program	"The Devourer of All Things, Part I"	Nominated	
2025	Children's and Family Emmy Awards	Outstanding Individual Achievement in Animation – Background Design	Bastien Grivet	Won	

== Tie-in media ==
=== Publishing ===
Two tie-in novels were published on January 17, 2023: Star Trek: Prodigy – Supernova, written by longtime Star Trek author Robb Pearlman, is a "middle-grade" story based on the video game of the same name; and Cassandra Rose Clarke's Star Trek: Prodigy – A Dangerous Trade follows the series' young crew as they attempt to trade a Starfleet battery for new parts with a group of rogue traders who plan to steal the Protostar. A third novel, Star Trek: Prodigy – Escape Route, was published on August 1, 2023. Also written by Clarke, Escape Route sees the crew of the Protostar take a detour to an uncharted moon that Murf wants to explore.

=== Video game ===
Outright Games, a video game publisher that focuses on family-friendly properties, announced a new video game inspired by the series in April 2022. Titled Star Trek Prodigy: Supernova, the game was developed by Tessera Studios for PC, Xbox, PlayStation, Nintendo Switch, Steam, and Stadia. It was the first Star Trek video game aimed at younger players. The story, written by Prodigy staff writer Lisa Boyd, follows Dal and Gwyn as they attempt to save their friends, the Protostar, and an alien planetary system from a supernova. The game features the series' main cast reprising their roles, including Mulgrew, and was released on October 14, 2022. Nintendo World Report said that "[w]hile combat can get a little repetitive, the puzzles are genuinely inventive." Nintendo Life liked the game's puzzle design but called the combat "perfunctory".
