= The Hageman Brothers =

American screenwriters and television producers

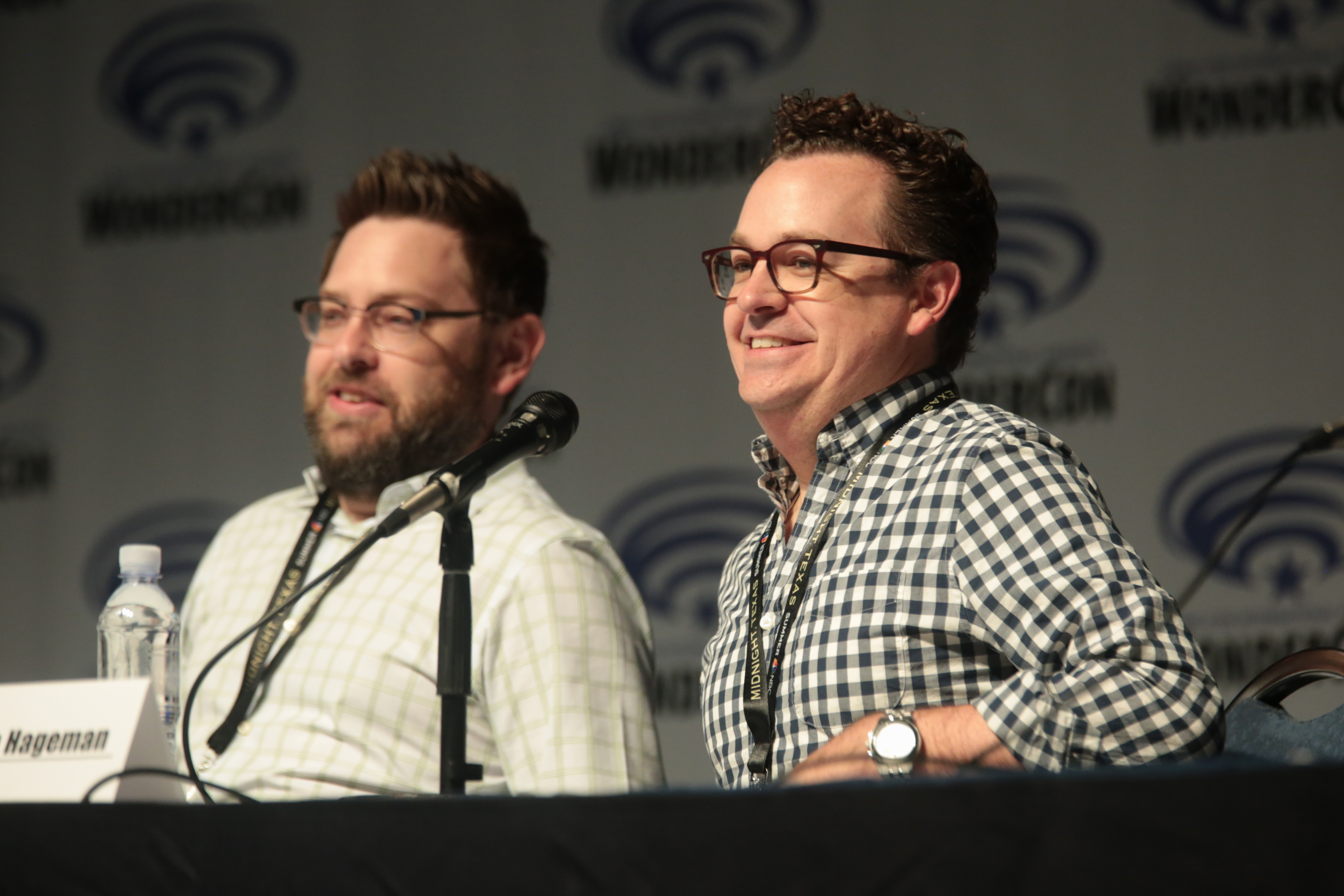
- Dan and Kevin Hageman at 2017 WonderCon.
- Born: Kevin: April 21, 1974 (age 52); Dan: December 17, 1976 (age 49); Lake Oswego, Oregon, U.S.
- Occupations: screenwriters, television producers
- Notable work: Hotel Transylvania; The Lego Movie; Trollhunters: Tales of Arcadia; Star Trek: Prodigy

Kevin Hageman (born April 21, 1974) and Dan Hageman (born December 17, 1976), professionally known as the Hageman Brothers, are American screenwriters and television producers. They are best known for their work on the television series Ninjago (2011–2019), Trollhunters: Tales of Arcadia (2016–2018), and Star Trek: Prodigy (2021–2024), as well as the feature films Hotel Transylvania (2012), The Lego Movie (2014), The Lego Ninjago Movie (2017), Scary Stories to Tell in the Dark (2019), and The Croods: A New Age (2020).

== Early life ==
The Hagemans were born and raised in Lake Oswego, Oregon, a suburb of Portland. They attended Lakeridge High School and went on to attend the University of Oregon. Kevin appeared as the character "Peter" in the Wee Sing video Grandpa's Magical Toys in 1988, his sole acting credit.

== Career ==
Kevin Hageman began his career as an assistant at Dark Horse Entertainment, while Dan worked as a copywriter. After moving to Los Angeles, the Hagemans successfully sold a feature film pitch to Amblin Entertainment and went on to write treatments for Hotel Transylvania and The Lego Movie, for which they received a "story by" credit on the films. While The Lego Movie was in development, the Hagemans wrote for the animated television series Ninjago for Lego.

In 2014, the Hagemans were hired by Guillermo del Toro and DreamWorks Animation to serve as writers and co-executive producers of animated series Trollhunters: Tales of Arcadia, for which they won a Daytime Emmy Award for Outstanding Writing in an Animated Program. They were then tapped by del Toro to write the horror film Scary Stories to Tell in the Dark. During this time, they were also hired by DreamWorks Animation to rewrite a draft of The Croods: A New Age.

In 2019, it was announced the Hagemans were attached as creators and showrunners for the animated series Star Trek: Prodigy for Paramount+ and Nickelodeon, the first co-production between CBS Studios and Nickelodeon in the Star Trek franchise. In March 2021, it was announced the Hagemans signed an overall deal with CBS Studios. In addition to Star Trek: Prodigy, they would continue to produce both animated and live-action film and television content for the studio. In 2025, they were nominated for a TCA Award for Outstanding Family Programming.

== Filmography ==
=== Television ===
- Ninjago (2011–2019) (writers, executive producers)
- Trollhunters: Tales of Arcadia (2016–2018) (writers, co-executive producers)
- Star Trek: Prodigy (2021–2024) (creators, writers, executive producers)

=== Films ===
- Mystery Men (1999) (Kevin Hageman, assistant to Mike Richardson)
- Hotel Transylvania (2012) (story)
- The Lego Movie (2014) (story)
- The Lego Ninjago Movie (2017) (story)
- Scary Stories to Tell in the Dark (2019) (screenplay)
- The Croods: A New Age (2020) (screenplay)
- Trollhunters: Rise of the Titans (2021) (screenplay)
