= Brett Gray =

American actor and singer (born 1996)

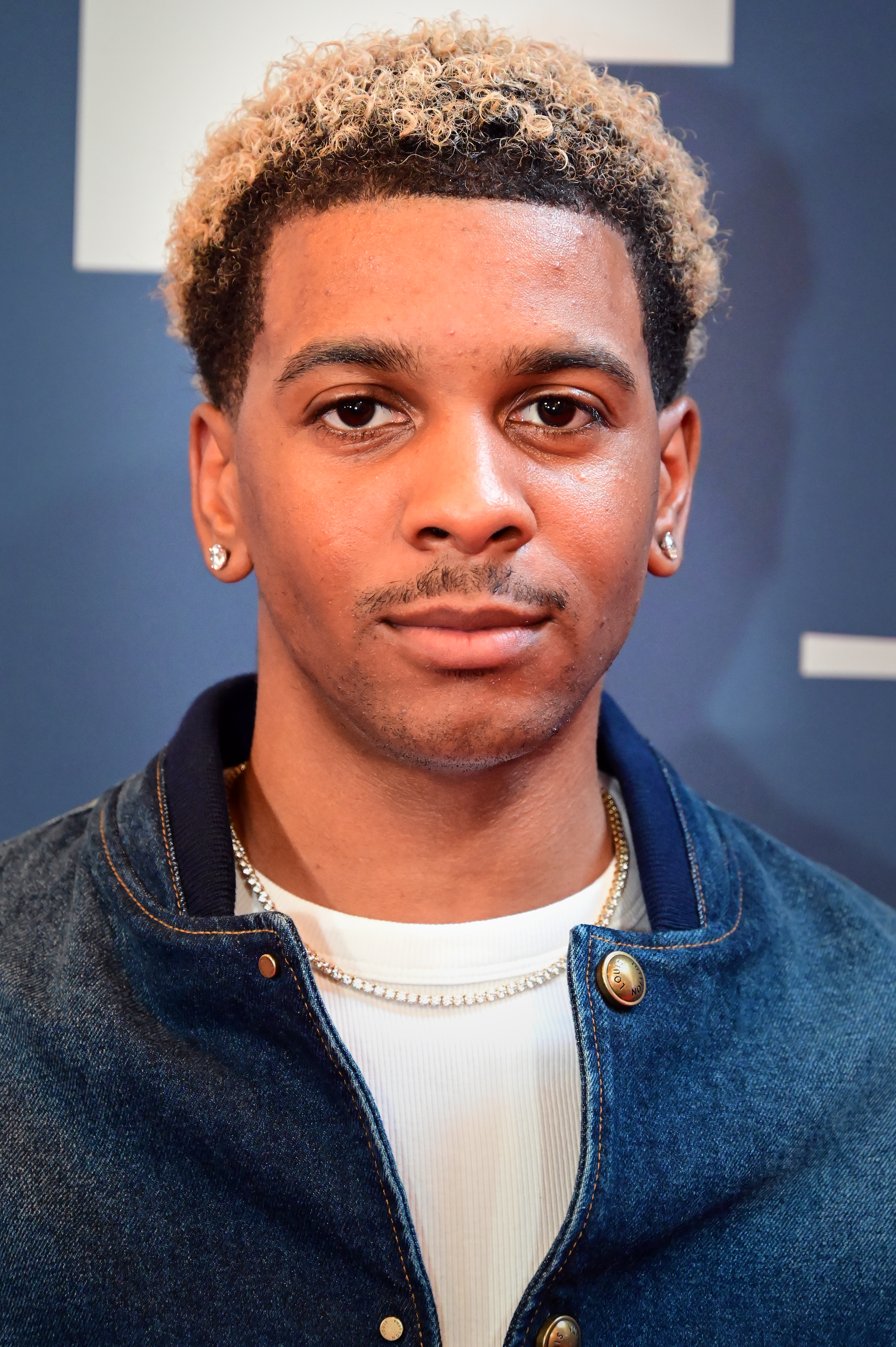
- Gray in 2026
- Born: August 7, 1996 (age 30); Philadelphia, Pennsylvania, U.S.
- Occupations: Actor, singer
- Years active: 2015–present

Brett Gray (born August 7, 1996) is an American actor and singer. He is known for starring as Jamal Turner in the Netflix series On My Block and Dal R'El in the Paramount+/Nickelodeon animated series Star Trek: Prodigy.

== Life and career ==
Gray was born and raised in Philadelphia, Pennsylvania. He acted in his first school play at age 6, after which he performed in his first professional show at the Academy of Music when he was 7.

Gray attended The Philadelphia High School for Creative and Performing Arts as a Theater major, graduating in 2014.

After doing a chemistry read for the producers, Gray was offered the role of Jamal on On My Block (2018–2021). It is his first lead acting role. He was drawn to the role because he saw himself in Jamal. He stated in an interview with The Fader that he also hoped to expand his experience with physical comedy, a genre he previously had no experience with. Gray had a minor role in the 2019 Netflix limited series When They See Us.

Gray released his debut single, "Old Thing Back" in June 2018. His EP Easy Daze was released on his birthday on August 7, 2018. He compared the style to Usher's album Confessions.

== Filmography ==
Year	Title	Role	Notes
2015	Tortoise	Mezzy	Short Film
2016	Ardmore Junction	Brett	
2016	The Tale of Four	Gregg	Short Film
2016	Metrocard	Henry	Short Film
2020	Law & Order: Special Victims Unit	Reggie Price	Season 19, Episode 14 Chasing Demons
2018–2021	On My Block	Jamal Turner	Netflix Original Series
2018	Rise	Dancer/Singer No. 3	
2018	Afterparty	Brian	Short Film
2019	Chicago P.D.	Aiden West	Season 6, Episode 15 Good Men
2019	When They See Us	Clarence	Netflix Original Mini-Series Part One
2021	Dramaworld	Evan	Viki Original Series, Season 2
2021–2024	Star Trek: Prodigy	Dal R'El (voice)	Leading role, animated series
2023	I'm a Virgo	Felix	Supporting role, Amazon Prime Mini-Series
2023–2025	The Chi	Damien	Supporting role
