= Ben Hibon =

Swiss animation director

Ben Hibon is a Swiss animation director. Hibon was born in Geneva, Switzerland, where he completed studies in Fine Art. He moved to London in 1996 to study Graphic Design at the Central Saint Martins College of Art and Design, followed by a master's degree at the same school.

Hibon created in-game sequences for the Capcom's 2005 video game Killer7. He also designed and directed a segment for Tokyo Zombie, a Japanese horror film written and directed by the infamous Sakichi Sato.

Hibon's short film Codehunters premiered at the MTV Asia Awards 2006 held in Bangkok, Thailand. Since its release, Codehunters has been shown in more than 50 festivals all around the world, and received nominations at the Raindance Film Festival and the Rushes Shorts Festival. It won a gold award for Best Animation at the Promax/BDA Asia awards in 2006, the Imagina Award 07 for best short film, a D&AD Nomination for Animation, and most recently the highly coveted Golden Nica award at the Prix Ars Electronica 2007.

In early 2007, Sony PlayStation commissioned Hibon to create and direct an animated series inspired by their flagship PlayStation 3 game Heavenly Sword. The episodes, made available weekly as a lead-up to the game's release, are also featured on the game disc as extras.

Hibon assisted David Yates in directing the animated short of The Tale of The Three Brothers in Harry Potter and the Deathly Hallows – Part 1. He is currently lined up to direct Pan, a dark contemporary version of the story of Peter Pan.

Hibon's work has been recognized by Promax, British Animation Awards, Creative Circle, D&AD, OFFF, Flash Forward Festival/NY and shown at festivals such as Raindance, Rushes Soho Short, onedotzero, Resfest, Art Futura, the Berlin Interfilm Festival, the Edinburgh and Stockholm International Film Festivals. His commercial work includes clients such as Sony PlayStation, Electronic Arts, Renault, MTV Europe, MTV Asia, Sega, Puma, Capcom, Channel4, Namco, Nissan and Kwik Fit.

In August 2020, it was announced that Hibon will serve as director, executive producer and creative lead on Nickelodeon's Star Trek: Prodigy.

== Filmography ==
- Parasite (2002, as director, producer, writer)
- Killer7 (2005, animation, miscellaneous)
- Codehunters (2006, as director, writer)
- Heavenly Sword (2007, as series director)
- Hellboy II: The Golden Army (2008, animation)
- Harry Potter and the Deathly Hallows – Part 1 (2010, animation director)
- Mirror Mirror (2012, animation)
- A.D.
- Star Trek: Prodigy (2021, as director, executive producer, and creative lead)
