= Kathryn Janeway =

Character in Star Trek: Voyager

- Star Trek character
- Promotional image of Kate Mulgrew as Kathryn Janeway in Star Trek: Voyager
- First appearance: "Caretaker" (1995)
- Last appearance: "Ouroboros, Part II" (2024)
- Portrayed by: Kate Mulgrew

In-universe information
- Species: Human
- Affiliation: United Federation of Planets; Starfleet
- Children: Three, with Tom Paris (Unknown Salamander species - whereabouts unknown)
- Origin: Bloomington, Indiana, U.S.
- Posting: Starfleet Command (NEM); USS Voyager (VOY); USS Dauntless (PRO); USS Voyager-A (PRO)
- Position: Starfleet Vice Admiral (NEM, PRO); Commanding Officer (VOY)
- Rank: Admiral (PIC); Vice Admiral (NEM, PRO); Captain (VOY)

Kathryn Janeway is a fictional character in the Star Trek franchise. She was the main character of the television series Star Trek: Voyager, which aired between 1995 and 2001. She served as the captain of the Starfleet starship USS Voyager while it was lost in the Delta Quadrant on the other side of the galaxy. After returning home to the Alpha Quadrant, she is promoted to vice admiral and briefly appears in the 2002 film Star Trek: Nemesis. She is seen again commanding the USS Dauntless in Star Trek: Prodigy, searching for the missing USS Protostar, commanded by Captain Chakotay, her former first officer on Voyager.

Although female captains had appeared in previous Star Trek episodes and other media, Janeway was the first to serve as the central character of a live-action Star Trek television series. She has also appeared in other media, including books and video games. In all of her screen appearances, she has been played by Kate Mulgrew.

== Casting ==
=== Star Trek: Voyager ===
Geneviève Bujold as Nicole Janeway

During the development of Star Trek: Voyager, one of the actors considered to play the captain, before it was decided the character would be a woman, was Gary Graham. Kate Mulgrew, Geneviève Bujold, Erin Gray, Patty Duke, and Susan Gibney were all considered or auditioned during development, with Bujold being initially cast.

The character was originally named Elizabeth Janeway, after the noted writer of the same name. After Geneviève Bujold was cast, though, she requested the character be renamed "Nicole Janeway". Bujold was initially very positive, saying in an interview, "This role is a challenge, but it feels right." Bujold, whose acting experience was mainly in feature films, was unprepared for the schedule demanded by television and was unwilling to do news interviews. After the second day of filming for the first episode "Caretaker", Bujold dropped out of the series.

After Bujold's departure, Joanna Cassidy, Susan Gibney, Elizabeth Dennehy, Tracy Scoggins, and Lindsay Crouse were considered as replacements. Erin Gray and Chelsea Field (wife of future Star Trek captain Scott Bakula) auditioned for the role. Not only was shooting already behind schedule, but the episode had to be ready by January 1995. It was not only the launch of series, but would also be the first program airing on the newly launching United Paramount Network (UPN), and over $20 million were being spent on the pilot. Kate Mulgrew, who had previously auditioned for the role, was cast on September 17, 1994. She suggested that the name be changed to "Kathryn", to which the producers agreed.

=== Star Trek: Prodigy ===
In October 2020, Mulgrew confirmed she would voice Janeway in the animated series Star Trek: Prodigy. Executive Producer Alex Kurtzman said of the choice, "We can think of no better captain to inspire the next generation of dreamers on Nickelodeon, than she." In April 2021, it was revealed that Mulgrew would voice an emergency training hologram based on Janeway. Though initially announced as a series for Nickelodeon, the show premiered on Paramount+ in October 2021, with later airings on Nickelodeon.

The real Janeway first appears in the episode "A Moral Star, Part 2". Janeway is searching for her former first officer, Captain Chakotay, of the USS Protostar. She commands the USS Dauntless, which features a quantum slip-stream drive. The ship is based on schematics the crew of the USS Voyager obtained under Janeway's command in the Delta Quadrant of another USS Dauntless, a ship used to bait the crew into getting assimilated by the Borg ("Hope and Fear"). She tries to keep up with the Protostar and its protowarp capability. The kids, desperate for a means of explaining the situation to their pursuers without setting off the "living construct" booby trap, since using regular communications with the Starfleet ships would do that, attempt a telepathic communication with Admiral Janeway. In the attempt, the effort goes awry with the consciousnesses of the kids' leader, Dal, and Admiral Janeway being inadvertently exchanged in their bodies. While this development allows Janeway to learn the full situation from the kids, Dal's struggles in Janeway's body leads to the crew to believe she had lost her sanity. The two manage to return to their bodies, but Janeway found herself in the brig with seemingly no one willing to believe her explanation of recent events, nor her warning of the Protostar's booby trap before it was too late and the Starfleet ships in the immediate area starting to attack each other out of the crews' control, and that promised to be only the beginning of the destruction.

The events of "Supernova, Part 2" caused Mulgrew's primary role in the series to shift to Admiral Janeway. Within this episode, the holographic Janeway stays on the Protostar to enact the self-destruct to destroy a "living construct" installed on the Protostar threatening to obliterate Starfleet. Though she promises to copy herself so she can join her young protégés, she is unable to do so due to the vastly increased complexity of her program, meaning her program is lost when the Protostar is destroyed, something she makes sure the kids only discover when it is too late so they would not delay their escape by arguing with her. When the kids reach Starfleet Headquarters, Admiral Janeway vouches for them and takes them under her wing as warrant officers.

In the second season, Janeway works with the kids to rescue Chakotay from the future, accidentally creating a universe-destroying temporal paradox in the process. As a result of the alterations to time, a younger version of the holographic Janeway returns in the second season, having spent 10 years marooned with Chakotay. At the behest of Wesley Crusher, Janeway reluctantly allows the kids to go after Chakotay alone, and they find and rescue the Protostar and him. At the end of the season, at Chakotay's behest, the Doctor copies the holographic Janeway onto an EMH backup module before her memories are erased, and the ship is sent back in time to be found by the kids. In the present, the holographic Janeway becomes the Emergency Command Hologram of the new USS Prodigy.

== Character biography ==
In the Star Trek universe, Kathryn Janeway was born on May 20, 2336 in Bloomington, Indiana on Earth. She was the daughter of Vice Admiral Janeway and has a sister named Phoebe, who is the artist in the family. Phoebe never chose to join Starfleet and stayed close to home with her mother, Gretchen Janeway. Kathryn Janeway was very close to her father, who taught her to look at the universe with a scientist's eye; she was devastated by his death. Her first mission after graduating the academy was as a science officer on the USS Al-Batani, where she served as chief science officer during the Arias mission.

Captain Janeway takes command of the Intrepid-class USS Voyager in 2371. Their first mission is to locate and capture a Maquis vessel last seen in the area of space known as the Badlands. While there, the Maquis ship and Voyager are transported against their will into the Delta Quadrant, 70,000 light-years away, by a massive displacement wave. The Maquis ship is destroyed while fighting the Kazon-Ogla, and although Voyager survives, numerous casualties occur. To protect the Ocampa, who live on a planet Voyager visits, Janeway destroys the Caretaker Array, the space station that transported the two ships to the Delta Quadrant, which provides energy to the Ocampa's planet, despite the fact that the Array may be the two ships' only chance to return home. In doing this, Janeway strands her ship and crew seven decades' travel from home.

Her first major task is integrating the surviving Maquis and Voyager crews. Chakotay, captain of the Maquis ship, succeeds the deceased Lieutenant Commander Cavit as her first officer. Janeway also grants convicted criminal, former Starfleet officer, and accomplished pilot Tom Paris a field commission, and makes him Voyager's helmsman.

Janeway's other interactions with her crew include helping the deassimilated Borg Seven of Nine reclaim her individuality and humanity and advocating for the Doctor's status as a sentient being.

During the course of the TV series, Voyager has contact with the Q Continuum on three occasions and repeated contact with the Borg. With the intervention of a future/alternate version of herself, Janeway leads her crew in using one of the Borg's transwarp conduits to return her ship to Federation space after having traveled through the Delta Quadrant for seven years.

In a cameo in the film Star Trek: Nemesis, now-Admiral Janeway instructs Captain Jean-Luc Picard to travel to Romulus at the invitation of the film's antagonist.

A few years after Voyager's return to Federation space and Janeway's subsequent promotion to admiral, Janeway commands the USS Dauntless in an effort to locate her former first officer Chakotay, who disappeared while commanding the USS Protostar.

=== Non-canon ===
Admiral Janeway also appeared in the Borg Invasion 4-D ride at the Star Trek: The Experience venue in Las Vegas, which closed in 2008. In the ride, Janeway leads Voyager to the rescue of ride participants who are ostensibly trapped first on a space station and later on a shuttlecraft that come under attack by a Borg Cube commanded by the Borg Queen. At the ride's end, Janeway tells the participants, "Congratulations. You've defeated the Borg with one thing the Queen can never assimilate: the human spirit. As long as we have that, resistance will never be futile."

Janeway continued as a major character in the Star Trek novels that depict the events in the lives of the Voyager characters after the end of that series. In Peter David's 2007 Star Trek: The Next Generation novel, Before Dishonor, which is set after the events of Star Trek: Nemesis, Janeway is assimilated by a rogue faction of the Borg, and becomes their new Borg Queen. Seven of Nine, with the aid of Ambassador Spock and the Enterprise-E crew, manages to communicate with Janeway's consciousness, buried deep within the Queen's mind. During a brief moment of contact, Janeway helps them destroy the Borg cube, with all hands on board. Although Seven manages to escape, Janeway is killed. Her memorial service sees a vast turnout, and a tall gleaming pillar with a light burning atop it is constructed in tribute to her. The Q female appears to Janeway's spirit, and tells her that Q and the Q Continuum had taken an interest in her. Telling her that she has a destiny, Lady Q takes Janeway by the hand and disappears with her into realms unknown. Writer Peter David explained the book was conceived by Pocket Books editorial as one in which Janeway would die, and that he was brought in to write it to give her a reportedly heroic send-off.

In the 2012 Star Trek: Voyager novel The Eternal Tide by Kirsten Beyer, Janeway returns to human life with the help of young Q, who needs her assistance, and by the book's end resumes her admiralship in Starfleet. In the 2014 Star Trek: Voyager novel Protectors by Kirsten Beyer, Janeway goes back to Earth per orders of Starfleet Command; by the end of the book, she returns to the Delta Quadrant, taking charge of the starships stationed there. She continues this mission in Beyer's second 2014 Star Trek: Voyager novel, Acts of Contrition.

In Cryptic Studios' online role-playing game, Star Trek Online, Janeway was physically added to game in January 2022, along with voiceover work by Kate Mulgrew as part of the game's 12th anniversary. Prior to her addition, Janeway was only occasionally mentioned in the game. She was also retroactively added to the game's 2014 Delta Rising expansion.

== Reception ==
In 2019, Vulture.com ranked Captain Kathryn Janeway as the number-one Star Trek captain by their selection criterion, a combination of competency and managerial style. In particular, they note her ability to overcome great challenges despite being on the other side of the Galaxy and commanding a crew in large part consisting of non-Starfleet personnel. One of her interesting relationships is noted as with the former Maquis B'Elanna Torres (played by Roxann Dawson), and the former Borg Seven of Nine (played by Jeri Ryan). Space.com rated Janeway as the number three best captain of Star Trek. In 2017, The Washington Post ranked Janeway as the third best Captain of Star Trek.

Screen Rant rated her the fifth-best captain of the franchise, noting her ability to command in adverse situations; two praises were that she does not give up easily and tries to maintain crew morale. In a review of female characters from science-fiction television and film, Janeway was in the top 10. Captain Janeway was ranked as the 18th best character of all Star Trek by IGN in 2009. In 2016, Captain Janeway was ranked as the eighth-most important character of Starfleet within the Star Trek science-fiction universe by Wired.

The romance between Janeway and Kashyk in "Counterpoint" was praised by Screen Rant, which they rated as one of the 10 best episodes of Star Trek: Voyager. In 2018, CBR ranked Janeway as the fourth-best Starfleet character of Star Trek. In 2017, Screen Rant ranked Kathryn Janeway as the 18th-most attractive person in the Star Trek universe.

In 2018, TheGamer ranked Janeway as one of the top-15 starship captains of the Star Trek franchise.

Captain Janeway was rated as one of the top-seven time travelers, in the whole Star Trek franchise by Nerdist in 2019, for her exploits in "Endgame".

In July 2019, Screen Rant ranked Janeway the fourth-smartest character of Star Trek.

In May 2024, CBR ranked Janeway as the best Star Trek captain to lead a series.

== Legacy ==
=== There's coffee in that nebula ===
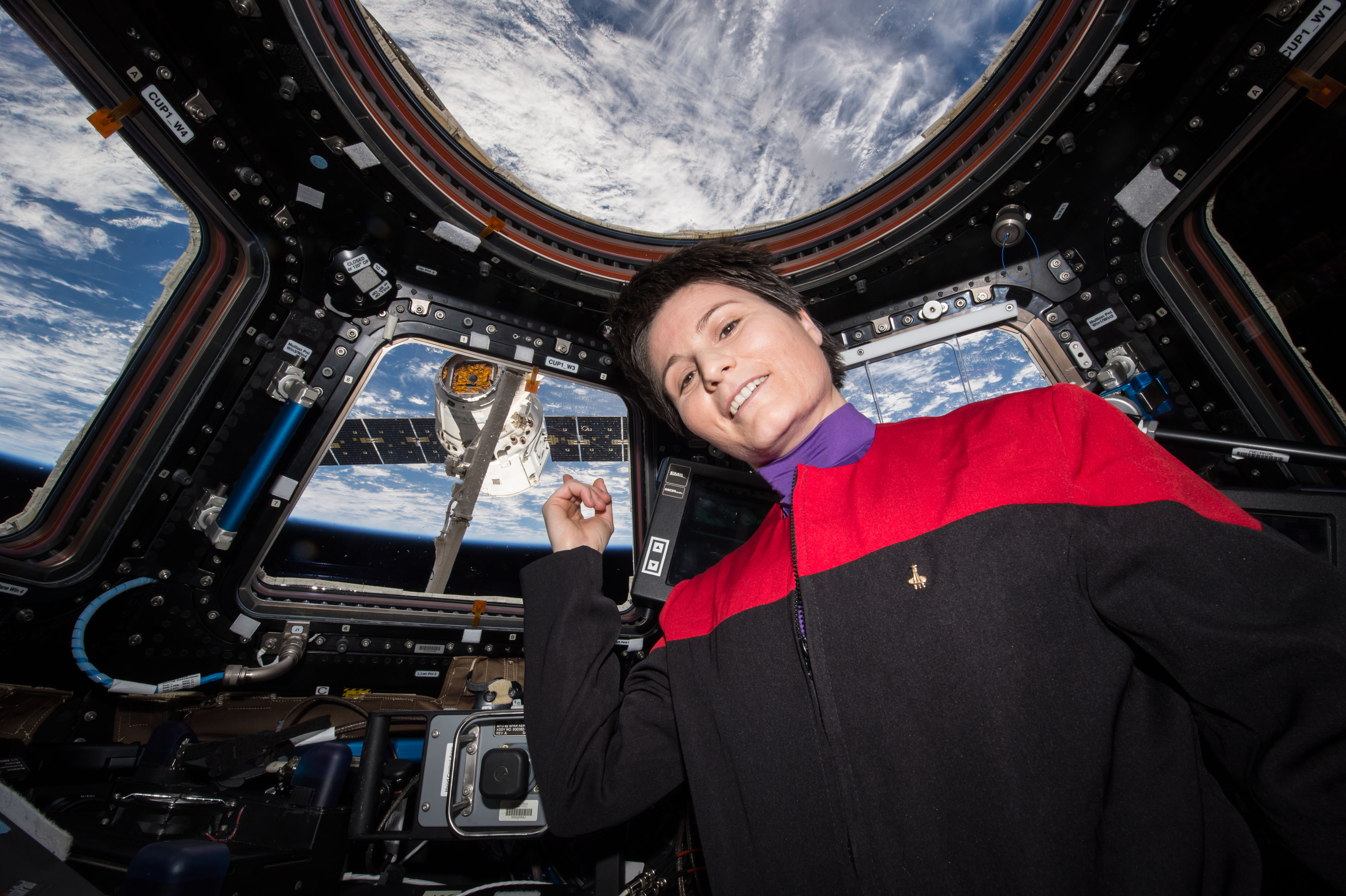
Astronaut Samantha Cristoforetti dressed as Captain Janeway, tweeted her line, "There's coffee in that nebula".

In 2015, astronaut Samantha Cristoforetti – then serving aboard the International Space Station– dressed as Janeway for photographs in which she gestured toward an incoming Dragon cargo spacecraft. She posted a photo to Twitter with the comment, "‘There’s coffee in that nebula’… ehm, I mean… in that #Dragon," quoting a memorable line by the character from the Star Trek: Voyager episode "The Cloud". The craft was carrying an ISSpresso machine and coffee for the crew.

=== Birthplace monument ===
In 2019, a group of Bloomington, Indiana, residents formed what is now the Janeway Collective with the goal of building a Captain Kathryn Janeway birthplace monument such as the one existing for James T. Kirk in Riverside, Iowa. Through attending local events and raising awareness, and with the permission of CBS, they were able to successfully raise funds through a crowdsourcing campaign on the platform Patronicity and received a matching grant from the Indiana Housing and Community Development Authority's CreatINg Place program.

An official groundbreaking event took place on June 27, 2020, and the monument was unveiled on October 24, 2020, after being delayed from the planned date of May 20, 2020, due to the COVID-19 pandemic. Kate Mulgrew attended the unveiling virtually due to the pandemic. The monument is constructed of a cast bronze bust with a limestone base with stainless steel plate, and was sculpted by Aaron Eby. It is located on the B-Line Trail immediately next to the WonderLab science museum.

On October 23, 2022, almost two years after the unveiling, Kate Mulgrew visited the monument in person, fulfilling the promise she made when the statue was unveiled.

== See also ==
- List of female action heroes
