= Real Life (Star Trek: Voyager) =

- Star Trek: Voyager episode
- Episode no.: Season 3 Episode 22
- Directed by: Anson Williams
- Story by: Harry 'Doc' Kloor
- Teleplay by: Jeri Taylor
- Production code: 164
- Original air date: April 23, 1997

Guest appearances
- Wendy Schaal - Charlene; Glenn Walker Harris Jr. - Jeffrey; Lindsey Haun - Belle; Stephen Ralston - Larg; Chad Haywood - K'Kath

Episode chronology
← Previous "Before and After"	Next → "Distant Origin"
- Star Trek: Voyager season 3

"Real Life" is the 64th episode of Star Trek: Voyager and the 22nd episode of the third season. This episode revolves around the Doctor dealing with his holographic family program. Robert Picardo plays a holographic AI aboard the starship USS Voyager in the 24th century.

This episode was the first of six in the Star Trek franchise directed by Anson Williams over a three year period. It aired on UPN on April 23, 1997.

== Plot ==
In the side plot, Voyager arrives to meet with Vostigye scientists aboard their station, but finds that the station has been destroyed by unknown causes. They discover a nearby subspace anomaly, likely responsible for the destruction, that is growing in intensity, and Janeway orders the ship to leave. They are suddenly hit by a massive energy wave from the anomaly that disappears just as quickly. The crew determines the anomaly is an eddy between space and subspace, and to be able to move away safely, they must determine when it will next appear. They launch a probe into the anomaly, finding it has a stable center like an eye of a storm and rich in energy they could use to power Voyager.

A plan is crafted to have Tom Paris use a shuttle to get close to the anomaly and collect the energy in the anomaly's wake, as Voyager's engines appear to be disrupting the anomaly. When Paris gets close, he suddenly disappears into the anomaly. Though injured and suffering effects of being in subspace, Paris is able to still transmit to Voyager helping to identify the structure of the anomaly as an interfold between space and subspace. With this information, Voyager's crew is able to help Paris ride the eddy back into normal space, where he is quickly transported to Sickbay and treated back to health by The Doctor.

The main plot of the episode centers on the Doctor. To help him explore what it means to be human, he has created a virtual family for himself in a holodeck simulation, consisting of his wife, Charlene, and two children, Jeffrey and Belle. The Doctor invites B'Elanna Torres and Kes for dinner, where the two find the family to be far too perfect. Torres offers to make changes to the program to introduce realistic elements to his family. Once completed, the Doctor finds Charlene too busy to take care of the children, and he must manage Jeffrey's involvement with Klingon teenagers and Belle's desire to play the dangerous game of Parrises Squares. The Doctor is troubled by these changes but stays with the program.

During the program, Belle is injured and hospitalized during a game; the Doctor performs surgery on her, but her injuries are too severe and she will soon die. At that point, the Doctor orders the program terminated. As he is treating Paris for his injuries, Paris reminds him that humans have to take the bad with the good, and that part of what makes a family is supporting each other through the hard times, growing closer because of it. The Doctor agrees, and he returns and resumes the program, where he, Charlene, and Jeffrey stay by Belle's side and speak with her as she passes away.

== Production ==
This episode had a teleplay written by Jeri Taylor, based on a story by Harry 'Doc' Kloor. This was the first of four Star Trek: Voyager episodes directed by Anson Williams, first of six total he directed in the Star Trek franchise from 1997 to 1999, when including two episodes of Star Trek: Deep Space Nine.

== Reception ==
In 2016, SyFy ranked this the 6th best holodeck episode of the Star Trek franchise.

In 2019, CBR rated "Real Life" the 10th best 'holodeck' episode of the franchise.

In 2020, ScreenRant included the Doctor's holographic family on its unranked list of the 10 best holograms in the Star Trek franchise.

== Media releases ==
This episode was released on DVD on July 6, 2004, as part of Star Trek Voyager: Complete Third Season, with Dolby 5.1 surround audio. The season 3 DVD was released in the UK on September 6, 2004.

In 2017, the complete Star Trek: Voyager television series was released in a DVD box set, which included it as part of the season 3 discs.

== See also ==
- Simulated reality
