= Cold Fire (Star Trek: Voyager) =

- Star Trek: Voyager episode
- Episode no.: Season 2 Episode 10
- Directed by: Cliff Bole
- Story by: Anthony Williams
- Teleplay by: Brannon Braga
- Production code: 126
- Original air date: November 13, 1995

Guest appearances
- Gary Graham - Tanis; Lindsay Ridgeway - Suspiria; Norman Large - Ocampa Man

Episode chronology
← Previous "Tattoo"	Next → "Maneuvers"
- Star Trek: Voyager season 2

"Cold Fire" is the 26th episode of Star Trek: Voyager, the tenth episode in the second season. The episode aired on UPN on November 13, 1995. It is a direct sequel to the series premiere "Caretaker" and explores the existence of another entity belonging to the Caretaker alien's species. This is also the first episode since "Caretaker" to depict members of the Ocampa species other than Kes.

== Plot ==
Kes and the Doctor notice a peculiar change in the remains of the Caretaker, the alien who trapped Voyager in the Delta Quadrant. They seem to be resonating in response to an unusual energy source. Remembering that the dying Caretaker had mentioned a female of his kind, Janeway wonders if she could be nearby. If so, a meeting with her could be their ticket home. As a precaution, Tuvok develops a toxin that could debilitate the female lifeform if she poses a threat. Following the energy trail, the crew comes upon a space-station inhabited by Ocampa, who fire on the ship.

Kes agrees to act as the crew's liaison to her people, and when the Ocampa leader, Tanis, boards Voyager, she assures him that the crew comes in peace. In a private meeting, Tanis tells Kes that the female Nacene, Suspiria, is nearby. She has taken care of this group of Ocampa for 300 years, and has taught them to develop their psychokinetic skills. He shows Kes a sample of the powerful abilities she has yet to tap. Later, Tanis communicates with Suspiria, who demands that he deliver Voyager to her.

As Tanis leads the crew to Suspiria, he tutors Kes on her telepathic skills. The lessons nearly end in disaster when Kes tries to boil water with her mind and, to her horror, inadvertently boils Tuvok's blood instead. He collapses, writhing in agony.

Tuvok recovers from the near-fatal incident. Kes realizes the full potential of her mental powers when her mind causes the plants in the aeroponics bay to burn up. Tanis urges Kes to leave Voyager and live on the Ocampa space-station, where he says she will be embraced by Suspiria and surrounded by her own people.

Suspiria, who believes the lies spread by the Kazon and others about Voyager, comes aboard. She tells Janeway that she will destroy them in retaliation for the crew's having killed the Caretaker. By the time Kes becomes aware of her monstrous plot, Suspiria has already attacked several officers. Kes, in turn, attacks Tanis with her expanded psychic abilities, and Tanis's pain temporarily incapacitates Suspiria. Janeway is then able to fire the toxin, subduing her. Janeway allows Suspiria and Tanis to leave the ship, while Kes remains with her friends on Voyager.

== Production ==
"Cold Fire" was developed under the working title "Untitled Kes Firebug". While writing the episode, Anthony Williams worked as the assistant manager of advertising at Paramount Pictures. The script's final draft was completed and submitted on August 30, 1995. The teleplay was handled by Brannon Braga. "Cold Fire" was set in stardate 49164.8; it was not stated during the episode, but it was included in the shooting script. According to executive producer Rick Berman, Suspiria had been developed in response to the studio's concerns that the show's focus on a crew separated from their home would be too depressing. Berman referred to the character as a "cover your ass" measure, as it allowed for a "fundamental shift" in the show's premise in case of a negative response from viewers.

Director Cliff Bole reunited with guest star Gary Graham during the filming of the episode; the pair had worked together on the show M.A.N.T.I.S. Graham did not enjoy his time on Star Trek: Voyager, comparing it to "taking a midterm when you really, really have to make a good grade". While requesting "two words" be changed, he said it had "t[aken] thirty minutes to get script approval on that back from the Ivory Tower". He negatively compared Voyager to his time on the show Alien Nation, which he described as having a "very relaxed and joyously creative set", and his performance as Soval on Star Trek: Enterprise, which he felt had a more relaxed filming process.

== Reception ==
"Cold Fire" is rated 7.4 out of 10 on TV.com as of 2018. It had 6.1 Nielsen points rating in 1995, and it first aired on November 13, 1995 on UPN.
