= Before and After (Star Trek: Voyager) =

- Star Trek: Voyager episode
- Episode no.: Season 3 Episode 21
- Directed by: Allan Kroeker
- Written by: Kenneth Biller
- Production code: 163
- Original air date: April 9, 1997

Guest appearances
- Jessica Collins – Linnis Paris; Christopher Aguilar – Andrew Kim; Michael Maguire – Banaren; Janna Michaels – Young Kes; Rachael Harris – Martis

Episode chronology
← Previous "Favorite Son"	Next → "Real Life"
- Star Trek: Voyager season 3

"Before and After" is the 63rd episode of the science-fiction television series Star Trek: Voyager, and the 21st episode of the third season. It foreshadows events seen in a later episode, "Year of Hell". The episode debuted on UPN on April 9, 1997. This episode is focused on the alien and crew member Kes, played by actress Jennifer Lien, in a plot involving a complicated time travel paradox with the USS Voyager.

== Plot ==
Kes finds herself living short periods of time in reverse order due to exposure to chronitons. She first gains consciousness in sickbay as an elderly woman, surrounded by her Ocampa family born on Voyager. The Doctor is able to put her into a biotemporal chamber to try to extend Kes's normally short life-span. Her next period of consciousness occurs some days before, where the Doctor has affirmed that Kes is suffering from mental deterioration due to her old age and his plans to use the biotemporal chamber. Kes finds it difficult to be around the members of her family whom she doesn't know. During these periods, she comes to learn that Voyager had suffered a "Year of Hell" some years before when facing a race called the Krenim that repeatedly assaulted the ship as it crossed their space, costing the lives of Captain Kathryn Janeway and B'Elanna Torres along with significant damage to the ship. As Kes's periods of consciousness approach that point, she is able to work with the crew to postulate the nature of the Krenim temporal-based weapons, and how to reverse the effects she is experiencing using a biotemporal chamber. The Doctor surmises that if Kes can obtain the temporal phase shift that affected her, he would be able to stop her backwards progression in time.

Soon, Kes finds herself experiencing the period of the Year of Hell. The ship is significantly damaged, and an undetonated Krenim torpedo is lodged in the ship. Kes witnesses the deaths of Janeway and Torres. She examines the dangerous weapon. She discovers the phase shift (which is 1.47 microseconds) before passing out and coming to at an earlier period. Realizing she is getting near the time she first joined the Voyager crew, she is able to convince the Doctor of her symptoms and the means to stop it using the Krenim phase shift. However, even in the biotemporal chamber, she continues to flash back, soon finding herself back with the Ocampa and still growing younger. She regresses further to an infant, then to a fetus, before she suddenly starts moving forward in time.

She eventually comes to in the present, three years since she joined Voyager and shortly before the Year of Hell. The Doctor acknowledges the biotemporal chamber a success and Kes is cured.

Afterwards, during a celebration in the holodeck for Kes's birthday, the crew ask Kes for details about their futures. Kes declines, but says she will write a report on all the information she has on the Krenim. As Kes leaves the holodeck, Janeway tells her she does not have to write the report just then with Kes replying "there's no time like the present".

== Production ==
In the promotion for the fourth season of Voyager prior to the start of the season, the "Year of Hell" two-part episode was highlighted as being a sequel to "Before And After".

== Reception ==
In 2012, Den of Geek ranked this as an honorable mention for their ranking of the top ten episodes of Star Trek: Voyager. In 2015, Den of Geek suggested "Before and After" for a binge-watching guide that focused on Star Trek: Voyager episodes featuring time travel.

== Media releases ==
This episode was released on DVD on July 6, 2004 as part of Star Trek Voyager: Complete Third Season, with Dolby 5.1 surround audio. The season 3 DVD was released in the UK on September 6, 2004.

In 2017, the complete Star Trek: Voyager television series was released in a DVD box set, which included it as part of the season 3 discs.
