= Fury (Star Trek: Voyager) =

- Star Trek: Voyager episode
- Episode no.: Season 6 Episode 23
- Directed by: John Bruno
- Story by: Rick Berman; Brannon Braga
- Teleplay by: Bryan Fuller; Michael Taylor
- Production code: 241
- Original air date: May 3, 2000

Guest appearances
- Jennifer Lien – Kes; Nancy Hower – Samantha Wildman; Scarlett Pomers – Naomi Wildman; Vaughn Armstrong – Vidiian; Tarik Ergin – Ayala (credited as Security Guard); Josh Clark – Lieutenant Joe Carey; Cody Wetherill – Rebi; Kurt Wetherill – Azan

Episode chronology
| ← Previous "Muse" | Next → "Life Line" |
- Star Trek: Voyager season 6

"Fury" is the 143rd episode of Star Trek: Voyager, the 23rd episode of the sixth season. Former regular cast member Jennifer Lien returns for the episode as an elderly version of her character Kes, who angrily travels back in time in order to save her past self. As with her final regular appearances in the first two episodes of the fourth season of the show, Lien is given an "Also Starring" credit, after the opening title sequence and before the guest stars are listed.

The episode was poorly received by critics.

== Plot ==
Voyager receives a distress call from a small ship. When they make a lifescan of the vessel, they are surprised that the occupant is an Ocampa. They make contact with it, and the bridge crew is shocked to see Kes on the viewscreen, almost three years after she left the ship and was not heard from again. Now here she is, looking elderly, tired, and desperate. She begs permission to come aboard, which Captain Janeway eagerly grants. Instead of docking her ship, Kes accelerates, ramming Voyager hard enough to breach the hull. Before the impact, she had beamed herself aboard, and has begun stalking deck 11 of the ship, blowing out bulkheads with neurogenic energy and the force of uncharacteristic anger.

Blowing past security, Kes enters Engineering. She connects herself physically to the warp core and begins to absorb power from it. When B'Elanna tries to intervene, Kes blasts her with energy, killing her instantly. Kes then disappears in a flash.

She materializes in an earlier time (2371). It is Voyager's first year in the Delta Quadrant, and Kes transforms her appearance to the way she looked back then to blend in. She goes to the aeroponics bay, where she stuns and hides her younger self. Barely disguising her anger and hostility, she interacts with the crew when she must. She boards a shuttle in one of the cargo bays, taps into its communications system and plots a course for her home world, Ocampa.

Tuvok, who has psionic abilities similar to those of Kes, senses something amiss with her. He begins having strange hallucinations. He remembers the Delta Flyer three years before it was even built, and he has a vision of five-year-old Naomi Wildman, who has not yet been born. He follows the little girl into a cargo bay where he discovers Seven of Nine in a Borg regeneration alcove. He snaps back into his own time, puzzled.

Meanwhile, Kes makes a covert transmission to the Vidiians, who are currently in conflict with Voyager's crew. They seek the crew, hoping to capture them and harvest their organs and tissues. Kes promises to hand them over in exchange for passage back to Ocampa. She has no affection for her former crewmates, who she believes abandoned her.

Tuvok has more intense hallucinations and collapses. At the same moment the Doctor and Janeway detect a burst of tachyon particles in Tuvok's vicinity, indicating temporal disturbances. His visions may actually be glimpses of the future.

Thanks to Kes' information, the Vidiians locate Voyager and attack. Janeway tracks down Kes' transmissions and goes after her. She finds Kes and her angry future counterpart, who lashes out at her. She cries that her life has been miserable since Janeway and crew encouraged her to develop her mental abilities. She feels she was not ready to leave the ship and wander the galaxy alone. For this she blames the Voyager crew and is determined to hurt them and rescue her younger, innocent self. She attacks Janeway, who is forced to kill her in self-defense. Voyager fights off the Vidiians, albeit with significant damage to the ship. The younger Kes, who has no idea what is going on, revives and assists Janeway and Tuvok.

Five years later, Janeway and Tuvok remember the earlier encounter with Kes. When Kes appears and aims her ship at Voyager they prevent the collision, and then rush to Engineering, which has been safely evacuated. The furious elderly Kes has just been stopped in her tracks by a holographic recording of herself made five years earlier. The younger Kes gives her angry older self a message, imploring her to remember the real past and to leave Voyager alone. When Janeway and Tuvok arrive, she remembers having left that message for herself and they talk her safely back to her undamaged ship, easing her anger, and wishing her well on her journey home.

== Production ==
"Fury" featured the return of Jennifer Lien as Kes, a character who had been a series regular for the first three seasons. She said on her return that "It just feels like [I've been gone] a day. It doesn't feel like any time has passed, whereas in my own personal life, time has passed and I can definitely feel that." During her time away, she had appeared in films such as American History X, and lent her voice to Men in Black: The Series. She had not seen any of the Voyager cast members since the previous October when she attended a charity event organized by Robert Beltran. When Kate Mulgrew later talked about the episode, she did not know why Lien returned, saying that "She seemed really sensitive about coming back... she seemed a bit startled... to find herself back in a creative reality that was, shall we say, so quixotic from the get-go."

Bryan Fuller and Michael Taylor wrote the screenplay for the episode, and made some changes after Lien was consulted. The actress had sought for the character to be changed from how she was portrayed at the start of season four, and she enjoyed the opening scene, saying "It's pretty cool how I make my entrance. I make a lot of noise!" For the scenes that required both Old Kes and Young Kes to appear on screen at the same time, Lien played the older version while the younger one was portrayed by Amy Kate Connolly. Lien was required to wear additional make-up to age her for the part and she praised the team led by Michael Westmore saying that they were "incredibly gifted".

She was pleased that the episode kept open the possibility of future appearances, and that it contained a growth arc for the character. When asked about the possibility of returning for the final episode of the series, in a similar manner to Denise Crosby as Tasha Yar in Star Trek: The Next Generation, she said that "I never know where I'll be or what I'm going to be doing at that point in time, however I do know that the show will grow. The show is going to grow without the character that I portrayed on it. So wherever it happens to be toward the culmination of the show, it will be at a point where [my character] may not be necessary or required. In that case the character won't be an important part of the story and therefore will not be needed. So yes, I could see not doing it. I could see not being asked back. I could also see that maybe there's a potential. Who knows?"

== Reception ==
In 2018, CBR included this episode on a ranking of episodes of Star Trek, they stated were "So Bad They Must Be Seen".

In 2020, Screen Rant said this was one of the top ten worst episodes of Star Trek:Voyager, with an IMDb rating of 6.3 out of 10.

The Digital Fix said this episode had wooden acting and terrible writing, and was only surpassed by the even worse "Fair Haven" and "Spirit Folk" as the worst episodes in season 6.

Actress Jennifer Lien, who played Kes, said she was not proud of this episode and said she made some bad acting choices. She was grateful to come back and act again, but preferred the 1997 season 4 episode "The Gift" as her exit episode.

In 2016, Den of Geek ranked it the 11th best Star Trek episode that Bryan Fuller wrote for, and said it was a "compelling character study".
