= Warlord (Star Trek: Voyager) =

- Star Trek: Voyager episode
- Episode no.: Season 3 Episode 10
- Directed by: David Livingston
- Story by: Andrew Shepard Price; Mark Gaberman
- Teleplay by: Lisa Klink
- Production code: 152
- Original air date: November 20, 1996

Guest appearances
- Anthony Crivello – Adin; Brad Greenquist – Demmas; Galyn Görg – Nori; Charles Emmett – Resh; Karl Wiedergott – Ameron; Leigh McCloskey – Tieran

Episode chronology
← Previous "Future's End, Part II"	Next → "The Q and the Grey"
- Star Trek: Voyager season 3

"Warlord" is the 52nd episode of Star Trek: Voyager, the tenth episode of the third season. The crew encounters the Ilari aliens, which commandeer Kes's body during political struggles on their homeworld. The crew works with factions of the aliens as Kes struggles to maintain control of her mind.

== Plot ==
The USS Voyager beams aboard three people just before their damaged ship explodes: an Ilari female named Nori, her injured spouse Tieran and an Ilari male named Adin. Although the Doctor and Kes try to save him, Tieran dies. Not long after, Neelix is shocked when Kes announces she'd like to spend some time apart from him. When Voyager arrives at Ilari, the local leader, known as "the Autarch," sends a representative to the ship instead of coming himself. Inexplicably, Kes pulls out a phaser, kills the representative and a crewmember, and escapes in a stolen shuttlecraft with Adin and Nori. The commander, Resh, is beamed aboard the shuttlecraft.

Kes takes the shuttle to a military encampment, meets with the commander, Resh, and takes command of the waiting troops. It is revealed that there is something in control of Kes' body. When Resh dismissively asks the entity in Kes why he took "a little girl" for a host, he responds by making Resh's nose bleed. He then explains that Kes has telekinesis and is useful for his plans. Meanwhile, Janeway meets with Demmas, the Autarch's oldest son, who explains that Kes' body is now inhabited by Tieran, a former Ilarian ruler who was overthrown by Demmas' ancestor 200 years ago. Since then, Tieran has lived on by transferring his mind to a series of host bodies. Janeway agrees to help Demmas stop Kes/Tieran, but before she can, the tyrant kills the Autarch in front of Demmas' younger brother, Ameron, and appoints himself the new Autarch.

Kes/Tieran tries to poison Ameron's thoughts against Demmas and urges him to cooperate with the new regime. Meanwhile, the Doctor designs a synaptic stimulator that will remove Tieran's neural pattern from Kes, if they can get close enough to use it. Tuvok beams into the Autarch's palace, but is quickly caught and imprisoned. When Kes/Tieran interrogates Tuvok, the Vulcan is able to initiate a mind-meld and speak directly to Kes, who tells Tuvok she is fighting Tieran for control.

Kes/Tieran orders Voyager to leave orbit, but the stress of the mental battle between Kes and Tieran results in Kes/Tieran killing Adin. After a series of maneuvers, Tieran is finally isolated and destroyed. Demmas, the rightful heir, becomes Autarch. In a mind meld with Tuvok, Kes sadly admits that she will no longer have the same relationship with her Voyager friends, especially Neelix. (This foreshadows their future breakup when her growing mental powers cause her to leave Voyager). Tuvok explains to her that she must use this life experience to learn from and grow.

== Reception ==
The Nielsen rating for the episode when first broadcast on UPN was 4.7 points. Jim's Reviews summarized it as "Kes on power trip" and rated in 7.25 out 10. Jammer's Reviews gave it 2.5 out 4 stars, and praised Lien's acting.

== Home media releases ==
"Warlord" was released on DVD on July 6, 2004, as part of Star Trek Voyager: Complete Third Season, with Dolby 5.1 surround audio. The season 3 DVD was released in the UK on September 6, 2004.

In 2017, the complete Star Trek: Voyager television series was released in a DVD box set, which included "Warlord" as part of the season 3 discs.

"Flashback" was released on LaserDisc in Japan on June 25, 1999, as part of the 3rd season vol.1 set.
