= Caretaker (Star Trek: Voyager) =

- Star Trek: Voyager episodes
- Episode nos.: Season 1 Episodes 1 and 2
- Directed by: Winrich Kolbe
- Story by: Rick Berman; Michael Piller; Jeri Taylor
- Teleplay by: Michael Piller; Jeri Taylor
- Production codes: 101 and 102
- Original air date: January 16, 1995

Guest appearances
- Richard Poe – Gul Evek; Josh Clark – Lieutenant Carey; Alicia Coppola – Lieutenant Stadi; Gavan O'Herlihy – Jabin; Armin Shimerman – Quark; Basil Langton – The Caretaker; Angela Paton – Adah; Bruce French – Ocampa Doctor; Jennifer Parsons – Ocampa Nurse; David Selburg – Toscat; Jeff McCarthy – Voyager Chief Medical Officer; Stan Ivar – Mark Johnson; Scott MacDonald – Lieutenant Rollins; Scott Jaeck – Lt. Commander Cavit (uncredited)

Episode chronology
← Previous —	Next → "Parallax"
- Star Trek: Voyager season 1

"Caretaker" is the series premiere of the American science fiction television series Star Trek: Voyager. It was first broadcast as a double-length episode on January 16, 1995, as the first telecast of the fledgling network UPN. It was later split into two parts for syndication, but released in its original one-episode format on DVD and streaming services. Set in the 24th century, the series follows the adventures of the Starfleet and Maquis crew of the starship USS Voyager after they are stranded in the Delta Quadrant far from the rest of the Federation.

The premiere was seen by 21 million American television viewers in 1995. The episode won two Emmy awards, and launched the show into a seven-season run that concluded in 2001.

== Original broadcast and UPN ==
"Caretaker" aired on the United Paramount Network on January 16, 1995. It aired as a single 90-minute show, although later it was also played as two separate roughly-45-minute episodes. "Caretaker" marked the launch of Paramount's new television network, United Paramount Network, or UPN. The premiere aired between 8-10 p.m. Eastern on that Monday; however, not every television household saw it on that night and time, as the network's coverage in smaller markets (where it was even available at all) consisted largely of secondary affiliations, with UPN programming scheduled on a delay around that of the affiliate's primary network. For example, St. Louis affiliate KDNL aired it on a 2.5 hour delay (at 9:30 p.m. Central) after the evening's Fox programming. In some markets, such as New York, "Caretaker" aired against different Star Trek reruns on other channels.

== Plot ==
Unhappy with a new treaty, Federation Colonists along the Cardassian border have banded together.

Calling themselves "The Maquis", they continue to fight the Cardassians.

Some consider them heroes, but to the governments of the Federation and Cardassia, they are outlaws.

A scrolling text introduces the Cardassian and Federation relationship with the Maquis rebels. The opening scene shows the Cardassians pursuing a smaller Maquis spacecraft that escapes into the Badlands, a volatile nebula. The Cardassian vessel is damaged by a plasma storm and the Maquis ship is caught in a displacement wave.

On Earth, Captain Kathryn Janeway of the Federation starship USS Voyager recruits Tom Paris, a disgraced former Starfleet officer and now a captured Maquis member, to help find the missing Maquis spacecraft. Janeway is searching for Tuvok, her security officer who was a spy aboard the Maquis ship. Departing Deep Space Nine, Voyager journeys to the Badlands, where it is scanned by a "coherent tetryon beam" before a displacement wave hits and wreaks havoc on the ship.

The crew recovers and find themselves in the Delta Quadrant, over 70,000 light years from Federation space. Fatalities include Voyager's second-in-command, helm officer, chief engineer, and medical staff. The Emergency Medical Hologram is activated to treat the injured. Before determining their bearings, the crew is transported to a holographic simulation aboard a nearby array controlled by a being known as the Caretaker. Seeing through the simulation, the Voyager crew discover the unconscious Maquis crew undergoing strange medical experiments. The Voyager crew are subjected to the same experiments. Later, both crews awaken on their own vessels and find each are missing one crew member: Harry Kim from Voyager, and the Maquis' B'Elanna Torres. Attempts to negotiate with the Caretaker are fruitless as he insists there is "no time". Janeway offers to work with Maquis leader Chakotay, a former Starfleet officer, to find missing crew and return to the Alpha Quadrant.

The two ships follow energy pulses sent from the array to a nearby planet. En route, they encounter Neelix, a space trader eager to assist them in exchange for water and rescuing his companion, the Ocampa Kes, from the violent Kazon that inhabit the planet's surface. Kes' people live in a subterranean complex, cared for by the Caretaker who supplies them with energy and other essentials. The only expectation is that they tend to any beings sent to them, each suffering an incurable disease. As the crews determine how to rescue Kim and Torres, the Caretaker realigns the array and fires more frequent energy bursts. Vulcan security chief Tuvok deduces that the Caretaker is dying and is ensuring the Ocampa are kept safe by sealing the underground complex, though eventually their resources will be depleted. With time running short, a combined away team penetrates the shields protecting the complex and rescues Kim and Torres.

The crews again ask the Caretaker to return them to the Alpha Quadrant. He reveals that he was part of an ancient alien race whose technology accidentally destroyed the Ocampan planet's atmosphere, leaving it lifeless. In recompense, he and another of his race have cared for the Ocampa ever since. His companion having long moved on, he experiments on species from distant galactic sectors hoping to find a compatible match so that he could reproduce and pass the responsibility to his offspring. Nearing death, the Caretaker initiates the array's self-destruct sequence to prevent the technology from falling to the Kazon. As the Caretaker dies, the ships are attacked by a Kazon fleet. Janeway and Chakotay coordinate a counterattack to protect the array; Chakotay sacrifices his vessel to destroy a Kazon ship, but the damage the array suffers disables the self-destruct sequence. Janeway opts to respect the Caretaker's wishes and orders the array destroyed, despite it being their only chance at returning home. With the array destroyed, the Kazon disengage. Their leader informs Janeway she has made an enemy.

As Voyager begins a 75-year journey back to the Alpha Quadrant, Janeway integrates the Maquis into the Starfleet crew, with Chakotay as her second-in-command. Janeway grants Paris a field commission as a Starfleet officer holding the rank of Junior Lieutenant and assigns him as helmsman. Neelix and Kes join the crew as guides.

== Cast ==
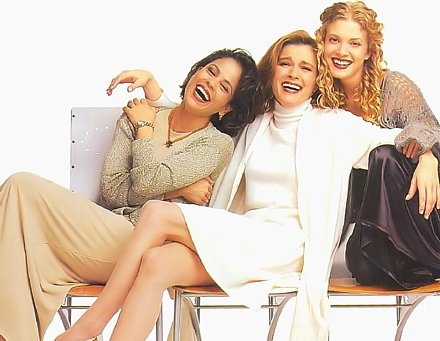
Voyager actresses, Kate Mulgrew (Janeway), Roxann Dawson (Torres) and Jennifer Lien (Kes) in 1995.

Due to the nature of the plot, the rest of the series has a different set of crew starting with the next (third) episode.

Main bridge characters in "Caretaker" of Voyager:

1. Captain Kathryn Janeway (Kate Mulgrew), who commands the starship USS Voyager
2. Lt. Commander Cavit (Scott Jaeck), Voyager's first officer when they set out from Deep Space Nine
3. Lieutenant Stadi (Alicia Coppola), the Betazoid Helm Officer
4. Ensign Harry Kim (Garrett Wang), the Operations Officer
5. Tom Paris (Robert Duncan McNeill), Observer/Maquis consultant
6. Lt. Tuvok (Tim Russ), he is the Security/Tactical officer of Voyager but is working as a spy on Maquis ship Val Jean

There are also the unnamed Chief Medical Officer (a human male), an unnamed female Vulcan nurse, and the completely-unseen Chief Engineer.

As the episode progresses, more characters are introduced; see Cast of Star Trek: Voyager.

Quark has a scene in this episode; he was a main cast character on the show Star Trek: Deep Space Nine, which was in production concurrently with Star Trek: Voyager at this time. By the end of the episode, several major characters for Voyager are introduced, including Neelix and Kes. Chakotay, Torres, and Tuvok are also introduced on the Val Jean spacecraft at the start of the episode, and several other characters that were introduced, such as Stadi and Cavit, are lost. Since the spacecraft is moved to the Delta Quadrant, they are also cut off from communication with Deep Space Nine and Starfleet at that time.

== Production ==
Filming began on September 6, 1994, with the scenes set on Deep Space Nine. Scenes with Geneviève Bujold, the first actress chosen to play Captain Nicole Janeway, were filmed with her over September 7 and 8. Bujold and the director Winrich Kolbe reportedly disagreed over Bujold's performance: Bujold insisted on playing the role in a more restrained way than Kolbe wanted. She departed on her second day of filming and production was suspended until September 12, when filming of scenes without Janeway recommenced. Actresses reported as possible replacements for Bujold included Joanna Cassidy, Susan Gibney, Elizabeth Dennehy, Tracy Scoggins, and Lindsay Crouse. Kate Mulgrew was cast as Captain Kathryn Janeway, from among four actresses recalled from the original round of auditions, and shooting of her scenes began on September 19. Several of Bujold's scenes can be seen on the Season One DVD extras.

"Caretaker" took 31 days to shoot, and was filmed at multiple locations. The production of the episode remains one of the most expensive in television history, reportedly costing $23 million.

The series has similarities to Gene Roddenberry's Andromeda, which also features a hologram, a starship transported by an anomaly into a new alien landscape and the deaths of bridge officers and their replacement with a misfit crew. The scenes of medical experiments on the array appear to pay homage to Bujold's 1978 film Coma, and the opening sequence of the episode—a text crawl followed by a small spaceship being chased by a larger one—mirrors the opening of Star Wars.

The art department for Voyager was based out of the Dreier building at Paramount Studios.

=== Special effect model ===
In late October 1994, the USS Voyager model was delivered to Image G, who did the motion-control photography video work with the model for the special effects shots. The model was delivered by Tony Meineger to Image G, which was also motion control photography for the Caretaker Array, Maquis ship, and Kazon space ship. The production schedule was packed with other work, but special effect shots for Voyager were needed for the "Caretaker" and also "Parallax" episodes at that time.

=== Sets ===
Many of the main sets for the series were located at Stage 8 and Stage 9 at Paramount Studios.

An example of the complexity of some of the sets is the bridge of the Voyager spacecraft. The bridge had eleven different monitors of three different sizes, that had custom graphics displayed depending on what was being shot for each scene. For example, for a scene with the "red alert" setting, the appropriate video graphics would have to be displayed on cue. These graphics were created by a team of people, with a need for both static and video graphics. The videos were recorded to videocassette to be played at the right time, such as when an actor is looking at a monitor. For "Caretaker", due to changes and re-shoots, there were some very difficult deadlines on having graphics ready for shots, often involving discussions among staff.

== Awards ==
"Caretaker" won two Emmy awards, for "Outstanding Individual Achievement in Main Title Theme Music" and "Outstanding Individual Achievement in Special Visual Effects".

== Reception ==
Variety found "Caretaker" to be a worthy launch of a Star Trek series, calling it "impressive" and praising the design of the Intrepid-class Voyager spaceship. While "Caretaker" successfully established the characters and their predicament, contemporaneous reviews included complaints that the integration of the two disparate crews so quickly was unconvincing, and too many plot points were left unexplained, such as how Neelix and Kes met and how Kim and Torres were cured.

In the months leading up to its release, reviewers had already noted the series' diverse set of characters and, in a first for Star Trek, a female captain as a main character. This paid homage to Gene Roddenberry's egalitarian vision of the future, such as when he included the female Number One character as second-in command of the Enterprise in the original 1965 pilot of Star Trek, "The Cage". The actress that played that character, Majel Barrett (who soon married Roddenberry), also provided the voice for the onboard computer in several Star Trek series, including Voyager.

The 21 million American viewers were lower than the series finale of the seven-year run of The Next Generation, which had over 31 million viewers when it concluded the previous year. While Voyager went on to slowly falling ratings, it did achieve seven seasons of production. As with Deep Space Nine, it had consistently lower ratings than The Next Generation, but managed to be successful in expanding the Star Trek franchise and fill the popular appetite for Star Trek shows that had grown to a frenzy in the 1990s.

Alicia Coppola, when asked in 2000 about playing Lieutenant Stadi in the opening segments of the episode, remarked that the role was "a great part".

In 2012, Den of Geek ranked "Caretaker" the 84th best episode of the series.

In 2015, a Star Trek: Voyager binge-watching guide by Wired suggested this episode could not be skipped.

In 2016, The Hollywood Reporter ranked "Caretaker" among the 100 best episodes in the Star Trek franchise, and noted its similarity to the Next Generation universe, where the Enterprise was often transported to a distant location from which the crew were expected to escape. Two examples of this are "Where No One Has Gone Before" and "The Price", in the latter of which a spacecraft is stranded in the Delta Quadrant, just like Voyager. Voyager encounters the characters from "The Price" in the third-season episode "False Profits".

In 2016, The Hollywood Reporter said this was the 84th best episode of all Star Trek television. The same year, they ranked "Caretaker" the 14th best episode of Star Trek: Voyager, remarking: "The series premiere for Voyager promised a Star Trek like none before it" but noting its ties to Star Trek The Next Generation that ended its runs several months prior.

In 2016, SyFy ranked "Caretaker" as the fourth best out of six main Star Trek TV show pilots made up to that time. They felt that the "first act does a fine job of building both characters and tension", and was overall very ambitious. Despite these strengths, they did note a number of issues ranging from questions about the plot, science fiction technology and characters.

In 2017, Den of Geek rated "Caretaker" among top fifty episodes of all Star Trek, noting that it launched a new television series and was a "landmark". After rewatching the episode in 2019, Den of Geek noted how the premiere had been "captivating" while "[setting] the stage for another great mission to the final frontier".

In 2017, GameSpot ranked this as the third best pilot episode of a Star Trek series.

In 2019, Screen Rant ranked "Caretaker" as one of the top five episodes of Star Trek: Voyager, noting how it introduced characters with an exciting plot and made use of Deep Space Nine by having a stopover there.

In 2020, io9 listed the two-parter as one of the "must-watch" episodes of Star Trek: Voyager's first season.

In 2020, Tor rated "Caretaker" five out of ten, noting that while it was good introduction to the series they felt they had "fudged details".

In 2020, Syfy ranked this the 15th best episode of Star Trek: Voyager.

== Releases ==
"Caretaker" was released multiple times on VHS in various markets after its showing in 1995. The first VHS release in the United Kingdom was in June 1995 by the company CIC. By the 2010s, it was noted as a struggle to record VHS history, with some universities trying to save libraries of the cassettes. "Caretaker" was released as various sets, for example in the VHS set The Four Beginnings, which included the first episodes of TOS, TNG, DS9 and Voyager.

"Caretaker" was released on PAL-format LaserDisc in the United Kingdom as part of The Pilots collection, in April 1996. This collection included the color version of "The Cage", "Where No Man Has Gone Before", "Encounter at Farpoint", "Emissary" and "Caretaker", with a total runtime of 379 minutes.

"Caretaker" was released on VHS tapes on April 4, 2000, and in both 2004 and 2017 as part of the Season 1 Voyager DVD set when the whole Voyager series was released.

The soundtrack, with works by Jay Chattaway and Jerry Goldsmith was released on compact disc on October 17, 1995. The release also includes a text pamphlet with various facts about the composers in regards to the "Caretaker" soundtrack.

On the launch of the Paramount+ streaming service, on March 4, 2021, a one day only free Star Trek marathon was presented, featuring the first episodes of the various Star Trek television series, including "Caretaker". The marathon started at 7 am PT/10 am ET and was Live streamed on the YouTube internet video platform, going through each episode chronologically in order of release with "Caretaker" airing between "Emissary" and "Broken Bow".

== Novel ==
A novelization of "Caretaker" was released as a 278-page novel, and also as an audiobook in 1995 by Simon & Schuster. The novelized version of the story was written by L.A. Graf.
