= Kes (Star Trek) =

Star Trek character

- Star Trek character
- Jennifer Lien as Kes
- First appearance: "Caretaker" (1995)
- Last appearance: "Fury" (2000)
- Portrayed by: Jennifer Lien

In-universe information
- Species: Ocampa
- Position: Aeroponics gardener; Medical assistant

Kes is a fictional character played by Jennifer Lien on the American science-fiction television show Star Trek: Voyager. The series follows the crew of the starship USS Voyager, stranded far from home and struggling to get back to Earth. Kes joins the crew in the pilot episode "Caretaker", opening an aeroponics garden and working as the medical assistant to the artificial intelligence known as the Doctor. She is a member of a telepathic alien species known as the Ocampa, who have latent psychic abilities and a lifespan of only nine years. Her storylines focus on encouraging the Doctor to develop his humanity and dealing with her Talaxian boyfriend Neelix's jealousy. She also seeks to expand upon her mental capabilities, leaving in the fourth season after her powers threaten to destroy the ship. She reappears in a season-six episode and features in Star Trek: Voyager novels and short stories.

Voyager's creators Rick Berman, Michael Piller, and Jeri Taylor designed Kes to be a rapidly aging character who would provide audiences with a different perspective on time. Although Kes is portrayed as fragile and innocent, she is also shown as having hidden strength and maturity. Voyager's producers reluctantly fired Lien after her personal issues affected her reliability on set. At the time, this was not openly discussed, and her departure was attributed to other reasons; these ranged from Lien voluntarily leaving to pursue other roles to her being removed to make room for Jeri Ryan's introduction as Seven of Nine.

Kes was a fan-favorite character while Voyager was airing, although critics reacted more negatively, finding the character boring and without a clear purpose. Lien was praised for her performance, which was highlighted in reviews of individual episodes. Kes's age was the subject of critical discussion, questioning if she was too young to be dating Neelix. Lien's removal from Voyager received mixed reviews from critics; some preferred the addition of Seven of Nine, while others were disappointed by this casting change. Reviewers and fans disliked her return in the season-six episode "Fury", which some media outlets called one of the worst moments in the Star Trek franchise. Academics have analyzed Kes's representation of femininity, her relationship with Captain Kathryn Janeway, and her mental abilities.

== Appearances ==
=== Background and introduction ===
Introduced in Star Trek: Voyager's pilot episode "Caretaker", Kes is an Ocampa—a telepathic alien species with latent psychic abilities and a lifespan of nine years. She was born and raised on the Ocampa home world in an underground city, which was constructed by an alien known as the Caretaker after he inadvertently destroyed the planet's atmosphere. The Ocampa have grown dependent on his care. The Caretaker realizes he is dying and abducts beings from across the galaxy, including the Starfleet crew of the starship USS Voyager. He does this to find a compatible mate to produce an offspring who would continue caring for the Ocampa.

Kes dreams of exploring the galaxy and finds a way out of the city, but is captured and tortured by the Kazon. She is rescued by her Talaxian boyfriend Neelix who is assisted by Voyager captain Kathryn Janeway and her crew. When the Kazon attack and attempt to steal the Caretaker's technology, Janeway orders the destruction of his vessel. Stranded in the Delta Quadrant, she agrees to have Kes and Neelix remain on Voyager.

=== On Star Trek: Voyager ===
Aboard Voyager, Kes starts an aeroponics garden to provide produce to the crew. While working as a medical assistant for the Doctor, an artificial intelligence projected as a hologram, she encourages him to develop his social skills and the crew to recognize him as more than a machine. The Vidiians harvest Neelix's lungs in "Phage", and Kes donates one of her own to him. In "Elogium", emanations from space-dwelling lifeforms cause Kes to prematurely enter a fertile period. (Note: Ocampa go through a fertile period between the ages of four and five; Kes is one year old in "Elogium".) An Ocampa goes through this process only once and it is her only time to have a child. After discussions, Neelix agrees to be a father, but Kes decides against having a child. When Voyager moves away from the aliens, the Doctor determines Kes had a false alarm and would be able to conceive in the future. Neelix grows more paranoid regarding Voyager's helmsman Tom Paris and his interest in Kes, such as in "Twisted"; the two resolve this tension in "Parturition" during an away mission.

When Voyager discovers an Ocampa colony in "Cold Fire", its leader Tanis teaches Kes psychokinesis. Prior to this, Security Chief Tuvok had been training Kes. She uses her abilities in earlier episodes, including having visions of a planet's destruction in "Time and Again" and showing an eidetic memory in "Eye of the Needle". Unable to control her psychokinesis abilities, she destroys the aeroponics garden and nearly kills Tuvok by boiling his blood. The crew discovers that Tanis is working with the Caretaker's mate, Suspiria, to destroy Voyager, but Kes subdues him with her powers. In "Warlord", Tiernan, a former dictator of the planet Illari, possesses Kes and uses her abilities to stage a coup on the new leader. Under his influence, Kes breaks up with Neelix. Although Voyager frees Kes from Tieran's control and kills him, the experience traumatizes her.

In "Darkling", Kes is attracted to Zahir, a member of an alien species of explorers, and considers temporarily joining his journey. The Doctor injures Zahir and kidnaps Kes after developing an evil alter ego while grafting new personalities into his program. After the Doctor is returned to normal, Kes decides to remain on Voyager. Throughout "Before and After", Kes lives short periods of her life in reverse order, from her death to her conception, as part of an alternative timeline. During "Scorpion", Kes becomes telepathically connected with Species 8472, who are at war with the Borg.

Kes's powers advance at an exponential rate in "The Gift" to the point that she can no longer stay aboard Voyager, as they threaten to destroy the ship. Leaving on a shuttlecraft, she hurls Voyager and its crew safely beyond Borg space, roughly 10,000 light-years closer to Earth, before turning into living energy. In "Fury", Kes is unable to control her evolving mental abilities, and she fears that she would not be accepted by other Ocampa. She blames these changes on Janeway for allowing her to join Voyager. Breaking into Voyager, she travels back in time to negotiate with the Vidiians to take her younger self back to the Ocampa home world. The younger Kes makes a hologram to remind her future self about her love for the crew. This message encourages the older Kes to return to Ocampa.

=== Other appearances ===
In 1995, Pocket Books began publishing Star Trek: Voyager novels set during the show's run and after its series finale. (Note: Star Trek novels are not considered canon, and information from them can be contradicted and superseded by the Star Trek shows and films. David Alan Mack, a longtime writer of Star Trek books, said that the tie-ins were not considered canon and must be consistent with canonical materials.) Kes appears in the 1995 novelization of "Caretaker" by L. A. Graf and the 1996 book for "Flashback" by Diane Carey. Nathan Archer began writing the 1995 book Ragnorak, before the pilot episode aired and said that his interpretation of Kes, based on the series bible, was radically different from her depiction in the show. In Greg Cox's 1997 novel, The Black Shore, Kes has horrific visions after the crew takes shore leave on a seemingly idyllic planet. Cox included scenes between Kes and Chief Engineer B'Elanna Torres after reading an interview in which actor Roxann Dawson, who portrays Torres, talked about how the characters rarely interacted. Marooned, published in the same year, focuses on Kes being kidnapped by a space pirate; the author Christie Golden said that she wanted to explore how Kes would appear to an alien with a lifespan of thousands of years.

Kes appears in stories published after Voyager ended. She goes back in time to help create an Ocampa and Nacene hybrid in the String Theory trilogy (2005–2006) by Jeffrey Lang, Kirsten Beyer, and Heather Jarman. (Note: The Nacene are a species of aliens that include the Caretaker and Suspiria, who are shown in "Caretaker" and "Cold Fire", respectively.) The book describes the Kes from "Fury" as the "manifestation of her dark side" made as a byproduct of this time travel. Jarman used Evolution to explore questions she had with Voyager, such as how Neelix felt about Kes after her departure and what the Ocampa home world looked like in the past. In Beyer's 2012 book, The Eternal Tide, Kes helps to resurrect a dead Janeway.

Kes is also depicted in short stories, like Penny A. Proctor's "Restoration" from the 2002 anthology Star Trek: Strange New Worlds V in which she revives Ocampa's ecosystem. She is included in three stories from the 2005 collection Distant Shores. In Kim Sheard's "Winds of Change", Kes struggles with aggression after "Warlord" and asks Torres for advice. Sheard developed the concept after being told the anthology would focus on unusual character combinations. "Closure" is about Neelix seeing Kes after being caught in a cave-in with former Borg drone Seven of Nine. The author James Swallow was inspired by how Ethan Phillips, who plays Neelix, wanted closure for his character's relationship with Kes. In "Brief Candle", Neelix talks about one of his memories with Kes; the writer Christopher L. Bennett said she was one of his favorite Voyager characters.

== Development ==
=== Creation and casting ===
Kes was one of the first nine characters that Star Trek: Voyager creators Rick Berman, Michael Piller, and Jeri Taylor developed for the crew of the USS Voyager starship. Inspired by the Star Trek: The Next Generation episode "The Child", Berman, Piller, and Taylor wanted to feature a rapidly-aging character to encourage viewers to reflect on time. Early in production, they nicknamed Kes the Mayfly to reference her short lifespan. (Note: An adult mayfly's lifespan is very short, ranging from 37 minutes to a few hours. The insect belongs to the order Ephemeroptera; this word derives from the ancient Greek word ephemeros, which translates to "lasting for a day".) She was set to age a year at the midpoint of each season to emphasize this rapid age progression.

In initial descriptions, Kes was characterized as a potential scout and expert on gangs, but was later changed to be a medical intern, while Neelix assumed a similar role as a guide. When Berman, Piller, and Taylor wrote Kes with psychic powers, production assistant Zayra Cabot hired a paranormal-focused consulting firm, Joan Pearce Research Associates. Joan Pearce created a list of psi abilities, which was used to decide that Kes would be shown with limited telepathy in the pilot episode ("Caretaker") with further exploration of her power planned for later episodes.

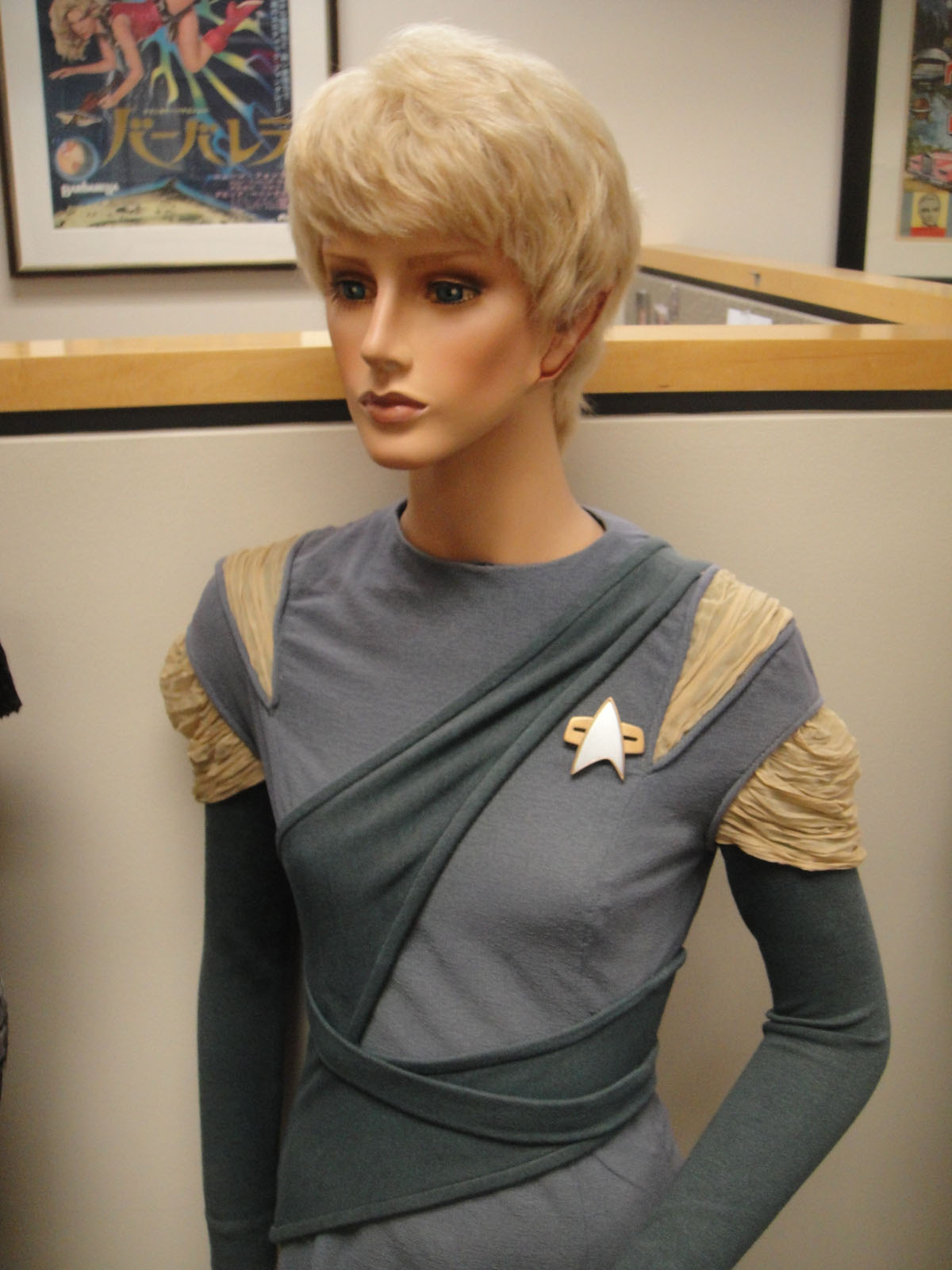
One of Kes's costumes along with her wig and ear prosthetics

Early in Voyager's development, it was undetermined if Kes would be female, male, or androgynous. "Caretaker" director Winrich Kolbe wanted an actress who "could be fragile but with a steely will underneath". Jennifer Lien was an "early selection" for the role; Taylor said that she had "this wonderful elfin quality" and projected vulnerability and strength in her audition. Lien was unfamiliar with the Star Trek franchise, and at the age of 19, she was the youngest actor on the show. Jennifer Gatti had also been considered for the role, and would later guest star in the episode "Non Sequitur".

For the pilot, Robert Blackman designed Kes's wardrobe and Michael Westmore created her prosthetic ears. Blackman had difficulty dressing Lien as Voyager's producers were unclear on her character's direction. His initial design was for a pastel-colored costume inspired by a sprite; producers rejected it, instead suggesting a costume similar to Peter Pan's. The final look was partially modeled on Joan of Arc. Kes's wardrobe primarily consisted of tunics, and Lien wore a short blonde wig. Lien tested combinations of wigs and prosthetics, which cinematographer Marvin V. Rush filmed for Berman's final approval. Westmore kept the prosthetic simple to facilitate working on 30 Ocampa characters for the pilot episode. Lien said the ear prosthetics impaired her hearing, and she developed an allergic response to them as the series progressed. Starting with the episode "Before and After", Lien no longer wore the prosthetics and used her longer hair to cover her ears and hide this change; around this point, her costumes also transitioned to tighter jumpsuits.

=== Characterization and relationships ===
In Voyager's series bible, Kes is characterized as "an innocent who sees humanity through a fresh perspective" and as "delicate, beautiful, [and] young". The "Caretaker" script describes her as a "dazzling, ethereal beauty, waifish and fragile" who has a "dignity to her bearing, an alertness in her look, that suggests a being of powerful intelligence". While promoting Voyager, Lien said that Kes lacked any "cynicism or precociousness or pretentiousness or sarcasm", and believed this separated her from the typical roles for young women. Taylor defined the character through her curiosity as demonstrated by how she challenges the Ocampa's beliefs and explores her mental abilities. Author Paul Ruditis wrote that Kes has a "fragile power" and balances a "child-like wonder" with a "maturity of someone well into adulthood".

Kes and Neelix were created as an alien couple who would learn about humanity together. They are portrayed as an unlikely pair in age and appearance, with Kes as the dominant partner keeping Neelix out of trouble. Kes and Neelix are shown sleeping in separate bedrooms, and their sex lives are left vague. Taylor said this was done to avoid potentially offending viewers, particularly families with young children and those against cohabitation. Taylor and Berman also worried that Kes was too young to show in a sexual relationship. In retrospect, writers and producers felt Kes and Neelix never worked as a couple; a break-up scene was filmed for the episode "Fair Trade", but was cut due to time constraints.

In Voyager's first two seasons, Kes is involved in a love triangle with Neelix and Tom Paris. Neelix becomes increasingly jealous over Paris's interest in Kes, although she never returns his advances. None of the actors involved liked this storyline, which was ended to avoid further damaging Neelix and Paris as characters. Aside from Neelix, Kes spent most of her scenes with the Doctor; she was instrumental to helping him develop his humanity and persuading the crew to view him as more than just a machine. The Doctor teaches Kes about medicine and Tuvok helps her to further develop her mental abilities. She is respectful toward the Doctor and Kathryn Janeway, whom she sees as parental figures.

=== Departure and return ===
In the fourth season, Voyager's producers reluctantly fired Lien when her personal issues affected her reliability on set. She had become increasingly unfocused, requiring multiple takes to complete a scene. Lien refused to discuss or accept help for her problems; Taylor said that no one on the set knew the cause for her behavior, which she described as "something emotionally upset". Actors on Voyager found Lien to be private and shy; Robert Picardo, who plays the Doctor, said that she became "really monosyllabic". Robert Beltran, who portrays Chakotay, got the impression that either Lien no longer wanted to work on the show or that the shooting schedule was affecting her.

The cast and crew did not publicly disclose the reason for Lien's firing. At the time, Lien was believed to have been removed to make space for Jeri Ryan as Seven of Nine, but these casting choices were unrelated. Paramount reported that Lien wanted to act in other projects, and Taylor said Kes "did not work out as well as we wanted". In 2004, writer Kenneth Biller talked about his disappointment about Kes's removal:

I was a little bit regretful when Kes left the show, because I thought she was an interesting character to write for—from a science-fiction standpoint—because she had certain... she had telepathic abilities, she had this very compressed lifespan, she had things about her character that often lent themselves to interesting storytelling [....] We lost something in losing the Kes character.

UPN executives wanted Kes cut from Voyager off-screen without explanation, but Taylor insisted that the character get a proper farewell. Lien last appears as a full-time cast member in "The Gift". It was intended to be the fifth episode of the fourth season, but was moved to the second after a decision was made to remove Lien earlier than planned. She had a final appearance in the season-six episode, "Fury". Berman asked her to come back before a story was completed. Lien discussed the script with Fuller and Michael Taylor to ensure that Kes was "handled with great care". Her primary request was for the character to be dramatically different than how she left. In a 2010 interview, Lien said she preferred "The Gift" as her final episode; she disliked her performance in "Fury", explaining that she had not acted for an extended period and struggled with playing such a different version of Kes.

== Reception ==
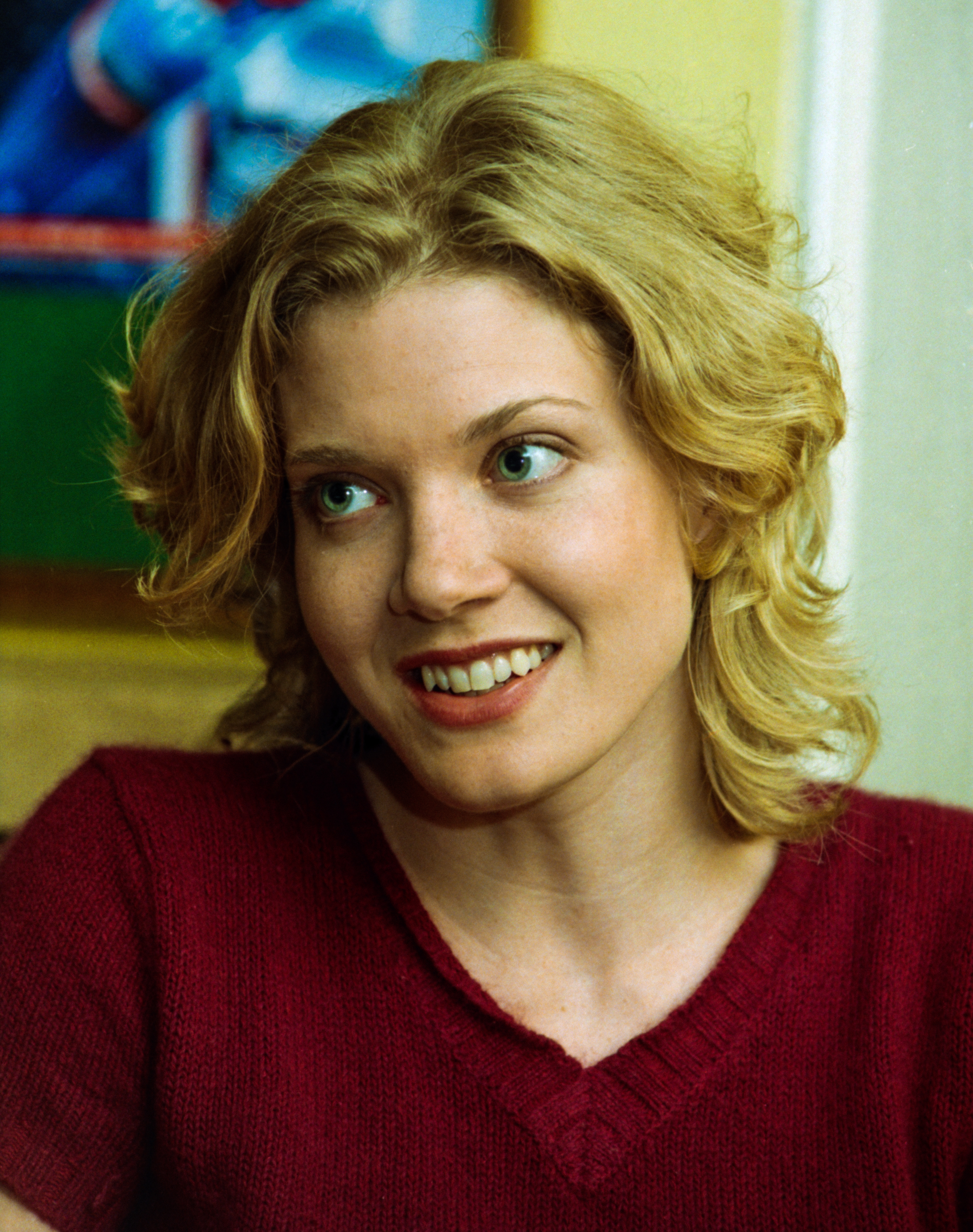
Critics praised Jennifer Lien (pictured in 1996) for her performance as Kes.

While Voyager was airing, Kes was a fan-favorite character, ranking as the most popular from the show on a Usenet newsgroup listing. The Virginian-Pilot's Larry Bonko felt that she "gave the series heart". Other critics had negative reviews for Kes, finding her to be boring and without a clear direction. Rob Owen, writing for the Albany Times Union, felt she was "reduced to a subservient Nurse Chapel role" early in the series. Henry Mietkiewicz of the Toronto Star thought she did not contribute much outside of her medical training. In retrospective reviews, Kes was called the show's "most superfluous character" by The A.V. Club's William Hughes, and "generally a pretty crap and useless character" by Tom Pritchard of Gizmodo.

Critics praised Jennifer Lien's performance as Kes. For the pilot episode, Variety's Kinsey Lowe described her as bringing a "beguiling blend of naive wonder and fierce dedication" to her character. While critical of "Elogium", writer David A. McIntee said she convincingly portrayed Kes's fear about her physical changes. Andy Patrizio for IGN wrote that starting in Voyager's second season, "we really started to see the talents of Jennifer Lien as Kes". He identified her portrayal of a possessed Kes in "Warlord" as a highlight. Reactor's Keith DeCandido praised Lien's acting in his reviews for "Cold Fire", "Warlord", "Before and After", and "The Gift".

Kes's age was a topic of critical commentary. Bustle's Marie Southard Ospina praised "Elogium" for its portrayal of a woman voluntarily not having a baby, but felt that Kes's age made the moment uncomfortable. Other commentators felt Kes was too young to be dating Neelix. According to Den of Geek's Juliette Harrisson, the age gap was frequently criticized online. Science-fiction author Sylvia Spruck Wrigley interpreted Kes as undergoing puberty in "Elogium", noting that it raises questions about Neelix starting a relationship with a prepubescent girl. Harrisson and The Philadelphia Inquirer's Jonathan Storm wrote that the age difference could be rationalized since Kes and Neelix are aliens with different biology than humans.

Some critics praised the decision to remove Kes during Voyager's fourth season, preferring the addition of Seven of Nine. The Akron Beacon Journal's R.D. Heldenfels described it as a "reasonable trade", viewing Kes as "wan and increasingly dull". Pritchard thought Seven of Nine was more complex compared to Kes. Other reviewers disliked this change, as they enjoyed the character. Patrizio was critical of the writers developing new ideas for Seven of Nine after struggling with Kes for three seasons. He preferred Lien's acting and Kes as a character over Ryan as Seven of Nine. Writers Duncan Barrett and Michele Barrett cited Lien's removal as an example of Star Trek having "a serious historical problem with the treatment of its female performers", explaining that a male lead was never taken off a Star Trek series. (Note: Prior to Lien being taken off Star Trek: Voyager, Grace Lee Whitney was removed from Star Trek: The Original Series, Gates McFadden from Star Trek: The Next Generation, and Terry Farrell from Star Trek: Deep Space Nine.)

Kes's return in "Fury" was criticized as one of the worst moments in the Star Trek franchise. DeCandido considered the story to be insulting to the character describing the script and Lien's acting as lacking any "emotional content". Michael Weyer of Comic Book Resources believed that Kes deserved a better ending and disliked how she came back as "twisted monster whose actions can come off as a spoiled brat". Fans were also critical of how the episode portrayed Kes. Den of Geek's John Andrews had a more positive response to "Fury", calling it a "sad yet compelling character study".

== Themes and analysis ==
=== Femininity ===
Academics analyzed Kes as a representation of womanhood and femininity on Star Trek. Communication studies professor Mia Consalvo described her as a "woman with stereotypically feminine traits" such as "empathy and caring". She identified Kes as one of several female characters with similar characteristics on Star Trek who are placed in healthcare rather than leadership roles, and argued that this is because the setting of the series "valorized" masculine traits over feminine ones.

American culture historian Peter W. Y. Lee said that Voyager characterizes Kes as a "little girl" who struggles to maintain her innocence as the series progresses, specifically with scenes involving sex or motherhood. Lee wrote that unlike other children in Star Trek, namely Wesley Crusher, Jake Sisko, Nog, Molly O'Brien, and Alexander Rozhenko, Kes is more of a "blank slate". He argued that Kes becomes too mature for this "little girl" role after adopting a "more aggressive womanhood and sexuality" in "Warlord" that foreshadows her having "outgrown her home" and leaving Voyager.

Voyager aired in the 1990s, a decade that editor Leimar Garcia-Siino characterized by postfeminism and its "reactionary anti-feminist and traditionally gendered views". Garcia-Siino wrote that although these events shaped the writing for Kes, the character was still portrayed with authority through her hydroponics garden and her medical and psychic training and is shown as reaching self-actualization.

=== Relationship with Janeway ===
Scholars had varying interpretations of Kes's relationship with Janeway. Cultural studies lecturer Debra Bonita Shaw argued that although Janeway accepts characters like Kes into her crew, she treats them as subordinates who must aid in Voyager's return home. Lee considered Janeway more of a parental figure to Kes. He noted that Janeway's actor Kate Mulgrew shared this view, particularly for "Elogium"; Mulgrew said the episode's focus on Janeway helping Kes with puberty and potential pregnancy and motherhood "showed my involvement with her on a very female level, a very maternal level".

Roger Kaufman, a scholar in LGBT psychology, interpreted Kes as one of Janeway's "significant intimate partnerships". According to Kaufman, it was shown in their protection of each other, like Janeway saving her in "Sacred Ground" and "Fury", and Kes sending Voyager's crew past Borg space in "The Gift". Kaufman wrote that Kes's decision to leave Voyager used similar language to a lesbian coming out; he paralleled her desire to explore her powers without endangering Voyager with a lesbian not wanting to cause trouble for her family of origin.

=== Mental abilities ===
Scholars focused on how Kes's powers contributed to her character development. Lee wrote that Voyager focuses Kes's character arc on her mental abilities rather than her physical development; he explained that "Kes's girl power rested in her brains, not her bared skin". Aviva Dove Viebahn, a professor of media studies, argued that the non-human Kes is nearly tokenized as a "native informant" whose role is merely to advise the human crew about the Delta Quadrant. For Viebahn, the character's mental abilities, which at times are more useful than Voyager's medical and scientific technologies, provide her a degree of agency which elevates her from this "subjugated" role.

Voyager often depicts Kes's powers as dangerous or unpredictable. Media studies scholar Marion Gymnich wrote that in "Cold Fire", Kes changes from "generally very friendly and gentle" to "extremely destructive" after being tutored by another Ocampa. She cited her as an example of Star Trek negatively portraying telepathy. Comparing Voyager to Homer's epic poem Odyssey, literary scholar Kwasu David Tembo likened Kes to two of the poem's characters—Calypso and Circe—as her powers both endanger the ship and aid in its homeward journey. Tembo wrote that Kes and Circe both have the "attractive and equally dangerous aspects of Aeaea and Ocampan power are under the absolute control of a female authority".
