= Tom Paris =

Fictional character from Star Trek

- Star Trek character
- First appearance: "Caretaker" (1995) (Voyager)
- Last appearance: "We'll Always Have Tom Paris" (2021) (Lower Decks)
- Portrayed by: Robert Duncan McNeill

In-universe information
- Full name: Thomas Eugene Paris
- Nickname: Tom
- Species: Human
- Affiliation: United Federation of Planets; Starfleet; Maquis
- Family: Owen Paris (father); Julia Paris (mother) (Note: Name given based from the Star Trek: Voyager novel "Full Circle")
- Spouse: B'Elanna Torres
- Children: Miral Paris; Three with Kathryn Janeway (Unknown salamander-like species)
- Posting: Helmsman and medic, USS Voyager
- Rank: Lieutenant (Lower Decks); Lt. Junior Grade (Voyager); Ensign (Voyager)

Lieutenant Thomas Eugene "Tom" Paris is a fictional character in the American science fiction television series Star Trek: Voyager and is portrayed by Robert Duncan McNeill. Paris is the chief helmsman, as well as a temporary auxiliary medic, of the USS Voyager, a Starfleet ship that was stranded in the Delta Quadrant by an alien entity known as the Caretaker.

Initially recruited by Captain Kathryn Janeway as a Starfleet "observer" on Voyager's first mission into the Badlands, Paris was reinstated as a Starfleet officer by Janeway and took on the role of being Voyager's helmsman after the original helmsman was killed during the ship's turbulent displacement from the Alpha Quadrant.

The character's middle name, "Eugene", is a tribute to Star Trek creator Gene Roddenberry.

== Background ==
He of all the crew is not dismayed by the cruel fate which has befallen them: what does it matter that they're at the ends of the galaxy? He's flying a ship and having adventures – that's just what he wants to be doing and it doesn't matter particularly to him where it happens.

— Rick Berman, Michael Piller, Jeri Taylor, Tom Paris' description, Star Trek: Voyager Bible, 1995

The writers planned to use the character of Nicholas Locarno as a template for Tom Paris, a previous similar character played by McNeill in the Next Generation episode "The First Duty". Voyager's writers created an entirely new character sharing many of Locarno's attributes. One reason for this is that the writers wanted to have the character be a story of redemption, and they did not like the backstory established for Locarno.

Paris' character has two backstories. The original backstory, and the only one acknowledged onscreen, cast Paris as a disgraced officer dishonorably discharged from Starfleet for covering up pilot error following a shuttle accident on Caldik Prime. In her published novel, Pathways, Voyager producer Jeri Taylor provided an alternative story much more similar to Locarno's, moving the accident to Paris' Academy years and making his fellow cadets the victims of his recklessness.

== Appearances ==
=== Prior to Voyager ===
In the Star Trek fictional universe, Star Trek: Voyager takes place in the years 2371 to 2378. Most of Paris' backstory takes place prior to the 2370s.

Tom Paris is the son of Starfleet Admiral Owen Paris, with most of his other family also hailing from Starfleet. Following his family's tradition, Paris attended Starfleet Academy sometime in the 2350s and majored in astrophysics. A gifted pilot, he earned an assignment to the Academy's honor squadron.

His relationship with his father was not a good one; while Tom wanted to join the Federation Naval Patrol due to his love for the sea, Owen wanted him to enlist at Starfleet Academy. Admiral Paris often disapproved of his son's tendency to get into fights and his resulting punishments.

After his graduation from Starfleet Academy, Paris was assigned to the USS Exeter. During his initial tenure at Starfleet, Paris crashed a shuttle he was piloting near Caldik Prime, killing three other Starfleet officers. Afraid he would lose his commission, Paris falsified records to conceal the cause of the accident. His efforts to cover up his pilot error succeeded, but overwhelmed by guilt and regret, he confessed. He was court martialed for his actions and dishonorably discharged from Starfleet. This caused a major rift between Paris and his father.

Following his discharge, Paris left San Francisco for Marseille, where he started spending his time drinking and playing pool in Sandrine's, a waterfront bar that he frequented during his academy days. There, Chakotay, a former Starfleet officer now serving with the Maquis, recruited him to serve as a mercenary pilot for the Maquis Rebellion against the Federation. This adventure went no better than his earlier stint in Starfleet as Paris was captured by Starfleet while piloting his first mission for the Maquis.

Tried and convicted of treason for aiding the Maquis Rebellion, Paris was sentenced to serve time in a Federation penal settlement near Auckland, New Zealand.

=== Events of Voyager ===
While serving time, Paris is visited by Kathryn Janeway, captain of the starship USS Voyager. Voyager's first mission was to travel to the Badlands and locate a missing Maquis ship commanded by Chakotay, which also has Janeway's chief of security Tuvok aboard as a spy. Janeway recruits Paris due to his previous experience working with the Maquis, obtaining his temporary release. In return, Paris would serve as an informant during the mission.

Janeway and the crew of Voyager, while searching for the Maquis ship, are thrown into the Delta Quadrant by a massive energy wave created by an alien known as the Caretaker. Once there, they successfully locate the Maquis ship docked at the Caretaker's array. The survivors of the incident become stranded about 70,000 light-years from Earth. The Maquis ship is destroyed and its crew joins the Federation crew on Voyager.

The marooning of Voyager in the Delta Quadrant provides Paris with a new beginning. Janeway gives Paris a field commission as a Starfleet lieutenant and makes him the chief helmsman of Voyager. He had a rough start, however, as Starfleet and Maquis alike viewed Paris with suspicion due to his previous affiliations with both organizations. Paris worked hard to earn his crewmates' respect. During this time, he became best friends with Ensign Harry Kim, a young officer on his first mission who defied his crewmates to befriend Paris. Eventually Paris is accepted by the crew and becomes one of Janeway's most valued officers.

As Voyager begins its journey home, Paris is involuntarily selected to be an auxiliary medic on Voyager as he had previously studied two semesters of biochemistry at Starfleet Academy. He is initially joined and eventually replaced by Kes after she expresses a desire to learn from the Doctor. Later, on an away mission, Paris visits the planet Banea with Harry Kim to find a replacement collimator. Once Voyager arrives to pick them up however, they learn that Paris is accused of murdering a well-known elderly engineering physicist after allegedly being caught flirting with the latter's wife. As punishment, the Baneans imprint the scientist's final moments leading up to his death in Paris' brain, which Paris has to relive repeatedly, slowly causing permanent brain damage. Tuvok conducts his own investigation to determine the true culprit, and discovers that Paris had been framed by the Baneans' enemies and is being used as a messenger, with the messages being imprinted in the recollection which Paris initially thought to be random letters and numbers. Upon discovery of Paris' innocence, the imprints are removed.

During Voyager's second year in the Delta Quadrant, Paris reconfigures a shuttlecraft with the help of Kim and chief engineer B'Elanna Torres and breaks the transwarp barrier, achieving warp 10 and becoming the first known person to do so. However, this later causes Paris to experience an accelerated state of evolution that would normally take humans millions of years. During this, Paris kidnaps Janeway in a shuttlecraft and brings her on a warp 10 flight. Voyager later finds the duo on an uninhabited planet and discovers that they had evolved into amphibian-like beings and had reproduced. The Doctor manages to reverse the evolution process using antiproton treatments. Later that year, Paris also participates in a plot organized by Janeway and Tuvok in order to flush out a possible traitor aboard Voyager that had been feeding information to Seska and the Kazon, one of Voyager's enemies. However, this negatively impacts Paris' relations with first officer Chakotay as no one else had known of the plan, all being deceived by Paris' apparent tardiness and attitude. The plot is successful at deceiving the rest of the crew to the point where Neelix, believing that Paris was going to leave Voyager for good, gives a tribute speech on his own onboard show. Paris later manages to sneak on board a Kazon ship and discover the spy. In the season 3 premiere, "Basics", Paris takes back Voyager with the assistance of the Doctor, crewman Lon Suder as well as several Talaxian ships after Voyager was taken over by the Kazon.

During Voyager's third and fourth years into its journey, Paris is accused of bombing an alien world along with Kim and is sentenced to jail. Paris becomes gravely injured after being stabbed during a prison fight. Despite Voyager later discovering and bringing forward the true perpetrator, Paris and Kim are denied release due to the society's laws. Both men are later saved by Janeway and the others after they break into the prison. Relationships-wise, Paris grows closer to B'Elanna Torres. In one instance, Torres experiences symptoms similar to the Vulcan pon farr and aggressively pursues Paris as a result. Knowing that Torres was in a delirious state, Paris does not engage with her, angering the latter as she knew of Paris' advances. The year after, Paris and Torres are on an away mission which had gone wrong. As the pair float aimlessly in space in their environmental suits, the duo confesses to each other their true feelings. Fortunately, they are saved by Voyager in time. As the rest of the crew are unaware of the duo's relationship, they try their best to keep quiet about it. During that year, Paris also returns to being a field medic after Kes departs Voyager in "The Gift", serving regular shifts in the sickbay.

The following year, Paris builds his own unique shuttlecraft which he named the Delta Flyer. The construction of the craft was authorized by Janeway as Voyager had to retrieve a multi-spatial probe that was lost in the atmosphere of a gas giant. Paris and the Delta Flyer manage to safely retrieve the probe. Later that year, Paris is demoted to ensign by Janeway and placed in Voyager's brig for 30 days after disobeying direct orders to not interfere with another society, called the Moneans, who lived on a planet where the entirety of its surface area was covered in water. Paris, who had an affection for the sea, had become concerned with the planet's gradual loss of water. Upon discovery by Paris that the Moneans' own oxygen-mining operations are to blame for the loss of water, he goes in the Delta Flyer with a Monean in order to target the oxygen refineries so that they could be temporarily taken out of operation and redesigned in a way that reduced the loss of water. The attack is foiled by Voyager at the last second, preventing a massive catastrophe. As Paris spends 30 days in the brig, he dictates his whole situation in his personal access display device in the form of a letter to his father to pass the time, later instructing the computer to transmit the letter to his father once Voyager is within range of Earth.

During Voyager's last few years in the Delta Quadrant, Paris is repromoted to lieutenant junior grade in the season 6 finale "Unimatrix Zero" after a year of exemplary service. As Paris and Torres' relationship grew deeper, they marry during an interstellar race. Later that year, when it is revealed that Torres had become pregnant, Paris manages to convince Torres to let their baby inherit Torres' Klingon characteristics when she did not want them. As Voyager makes their return to the Alpha Quadrant and Earth in 2378, Torres gives birth to her and Paris' daughter, Miral Paris.

=== Later career ===
Paris briefly appears in Star Trek: Lower Decks in the season 2 episode "We'll Always Have Tom Paris", set approximately three years after the end of Star Trek: Voyager. In Lower Decks, Paris, who by then had been fully promoted to lieutenant, had been moving through various Starfleet ships and posts, conducting handshake tours and speaking of his experiences in the Delta Quadrant. In one instance, Paris visits the USS Cerritos, the show's focus ship, much to the excitement of one of the show's main characters.

=== Non-canonical appearances ===
In the non-canonical Voyager relaunch novels, written by Christie Golden, Paris was promoted two steps in rank, like many of the Voyager crew, and is now a lieutenant commander. He is serving as the first officer of Voyager, under the command of now-Captain Chakotay.

In Star Trek: Voyager – Elite Force, published by Activision in 2000, Paris appears in the game as the ship's helmsman.

In Star Trek Online, a massive multiplayer online role-playing game developed by Cryptic Studios, Paris is active as a Starfleet captain in the early 25th century. Paris made his first appearance in the game in 2015, with McNeill reprising Paris and voicing him.

== Personality ==
=== Personal interests ===
Paris had a deep interest in 20th-century Earth pop culture, often utilizing such in his holo-programs. This knowledge helped the crew during time travel incidents.

Paris had also shown an interest in cars; he was well-versed with 20th-century automobiles and even created his own holoprogram where he would tinker with cars from that era. This interest was also shown when Voyager encountered a Ford truck that originated from 1936 floating in space, as Paris was able to identify the car model and even the year it came from. He also programmed a holoprogram featuring a 1957 Chevy for the Doctor to use when the latter had an attraction to a Vidiian patient.

During Paris' childhood, he had an interest in the sea as well as naval ships; in one instance, Paris was scolded by his father for playing with ancient sailing ship models instead of doing his homework. This interest later pushed Paris to do everything in his power to save the Moneans' planet, which was entirely water-based, as it was losing water due to the society's oxygen-mining operations.

While serving on Voyager, Paris also nurtured a long-hidden talent for holo-programming, devising several programs for the entertainment of his fellow crewmembers. His most popular programs included a re-creation of Sandrine's bar, an Irish town called Fair Haven, and a 1930s-era sci-fi movie serial titled Captain Proton

=== Relationships ===
Paris was at times portrayed as feeling resentful toward his father, Owen Paris, due to the latter's words and actions which made Paris feel misunderstood and isolated during his childhood years. Their relationship improved substantially over the course of the series, due to Captain Janeway's willingness to offer him redemption, and later due to his relationship with B'Elanna Torres.

He became good friends with Harry Kim from the start and at times displayed protectiveness in the face of Harry's customary naiveté. In "Caretaker", he rescues the ensign from Quark, a manipulative Ferengi. Kim later befriends Paris. The bond between both men strengthened after Kim protected Paris while they were imprisoned in a jail complex despite the latter destroying one of Kim's tools while in a delirious state.

Paris also viewed Captain Janeway in high regard. As she recruited Paris to join Voyager on its initial first mission, he was fatefully brought along to the Delta Quadrant. This made Paris felt like he had been given a second chance in life and was grateful to her for it. In one instance where all members of the crew were forced to abandon ship as Voyager prepared to self-destruct in order to destroy a missile from hitting an inhabited planet, Paris thanked Janeway for everything she has done before he left the ship in an escape pod while Janeway stayed behind to oversee the auto-destruction sequence.

One member of the crew with whom Paris initially had a somewhat difficult relationship was Chakotay because of their history in the Maquis. Paris also expressed dislike of Chakotay's leadership as he felt that Chakotay was not flexible regarding Starfleet protocols, insisting that he overruled most of the other officers' suggestions and opinions. These tensions even escalated to the point where Paris had to be placed in the brig after pushing Chakotay to the floor. However, it was later revealed that these tensions were all a ruse in a plot to expose a traitor on Voyager, though unbeknownst to Chakotay. Fortunately, throughout Voyager's seven-year journey home, Paris and Chakotay reconciled (in part due to Paris having earned Chakotay's trust) and became good friends.

Initially, Paris and Neelix also often got into personal conflicts due to the former's often fraternizations with Kes, who was Neelix's girlfriend. Neelix felt jealous of Paris as the latter had given Kes a special locket for her birthday. They later resolved their differences after taking care of an alien baby together while on an away mission. When Paris appeared to be departing the ship in the episode "Investigations", Neelix was shown to be greatly concerned for Paris. When he later found out that Paris was part of a plot to expose a spy aboard Voyager, he volunteered to take part in the plot to bring back Paris safely. When Torres' baby was announced during Voyager's last year in the quadrant, Paris had initially thought of Neelix to be the child's godfather, though Neelix had to give the role to the Doctor as the former already had goddaughter Naomi Wildman.

== Reception ==
Wired ranked Paris as the 26th most important character of Starfleet in 2016, while Comic Book Resources ranked Paris as the 19th best Starfleet character in 2018.

In 2020, ScreenRant ranked B'Elanna Torres and Paris as the 3rd best romantic couple of all Star Trek. In 2021, they also felt that Paris' story arc was an interesting one, as he starts off on probation from Starfleet prison, but then returns to good standing over the course of his adventures on the show.

== See also ==
- Star Trek: Voyager
- List of Star Trek: Voyager episodes
- Star Trek
