= The Doctor (Star Trek) =

Fictional character from Star Trek

- Star Trek character
- First appearance: "Caretaker" (1995)
- Portrayed by: Robert Picardo

In-universe information
- Species: Hologram
- Affiliation: United Federation of Planets; Starfleet
- Spouses: Charlene (holographic wife); Lana (Human wife)
- Children: One (technological progeny via mobile emitter); Jason Tabreez (Kelemane's species son); Jeffrey (holographic son); Belle (holographic daughter); SAM (adopted daughter)
- Posting: Chief medical officer; USS Athena; Xenobiology teacher at Starfleet Academy

The Doctor, an Emergency Medical Hologram (EMH), is a fictional character portrayed by actor Robert Picardo in the television series Star Trek: Voyager, Star Trek: Prodigy, and Star Trek: Starfleet Academy. He is an artificial intelligence manifesting as a holographic projection, and designed to be a short-term adjunct to medical staff in emergency situations. However, when the USS Voyager is stranded on the far side of the Milky Way galaxy without medical personnel, he is forced to act as the starship's permanent chief medical officer. In an example of the Star Trek franchise's exploration of artificial intelligence, a rudimentary algorithm becomes a major character in the show.

== Casting ==
In a 2020 interview, Picardo said his agent told him that he was selected from 900 actors who auditioned for the role.

"I got the part without understanding that the character would be the outsider, the Spock-like character. The character who initially inherited that was Data, who had no emotion and longed to be a real boy in the same way as Pinocchio. I thought that, because Tuvok was a Vulcan character, he would deal with those issues. Once I realized that I had gotten the plum role, it was a delightful surprise. I went from thinking I had the dullest role in the show to believing I may have the best role in the show. That was a little daunting."

He added that he first learned what a hologram was from being selected for the role. "I was confused, I didn't know what it meant for him to be a hologram or a computer program. I didn't understand enough about Star Trek 'science,' which is based on real science, although we still don't know how to make a hologram with density. So I got the part without knowing at all what I was in for."

Picardo initially auditioned for Neelix. Despite Ethan Phillips' getting the part, Picardo was asked by the producers to come back and audition for The Doctor—something that shocked him, because usually actors would be passed over completely. During his audition for the role of The Doctor, Picardo was asked only to say, "Somebody forgot to terminate my program." However, he then ad libbed, "I'm a doctor, not a nightlight!" (Picardo was initially afraid that he might have ruined his chances—ad libbing, he explained, was something that one just "did not do" in an audition.)

== Depiction ==
The Doctor begins his service on the USS Voyager as the standard Emergency Medical Hologram (EMH) built into almost every newer Starfleet ship's sickbay. The EMH is to be used should the ship's doctor be incapacitated or require emergency assistance. In the series' first episode, Voyager's chief medical officer, along with his nurse, are killed, necessitating extended use of the EMH. The EMH eventually develops his own personality, although he generally maintains his acerbic wit and irritating "version one" bedside manner. As he was originally intended as a temporary medical backup system, not as a digital life form, Voyager's journey strains his programming to some limits. He gives himself a name during episode S1E12 Heroes and Demons, "Schweitzer". (This name did not carry throughout the entire series.) The Doctor becomes the chief medical officer, with Kes and Tom Paris at various times acting as nurses.

Attempting to develop a realistic personality, the Doctor not only manufactures a holographic family ("Real Life"), he also has an increasing number of other "human" experiences. This results in the Doctor's program evolving to become more lifelike, with emotions and ambitions. He develops meaningful and complex relationships with many members of the ship's crew. The Doctor also develops talents as a playwright, artist, and photographer, and even becomes a connoisseur of opera. He has multiple other experiences with "family", including having a son with a "roommate" while trapped on a planet for three years. During the episode "Blink of an Eye", he asks an associate to inquire further about his progeny.

A recurring theme are the ethical aspects of an artificial, yet apparently sentient, being. In the episode "Latent Image", treating two patients with an equal chance of survival, with only enough time to treat one, The Doctor chooses Harry Kim, a friend. The other patient, Ensign Jetal, dies. The Doctor is overwhelmed with guilt, believing that his friendship influenced his choice. When the stress nearly leads to his program breaking down, Captain Janeway has his memories of these events deleted. When The Doctor later discovers clues as to what had happened, Captain Janeway is convinced by him and others that he has a right to learn to come to grips with the guilt in the manner of any other sentient being rather than be treated merely as a defective piece of equipment.

The Doctor submits a holonovel titled Photons Be Free to a publisher on Earth, detailing the manner in which holograms are sometimes treated by Starfleet. His characters are closely based on Voyager's crew, but exaggerated to appear more intense and vicious, creating fears among the crew their reputations would be ruined. Tom Paris convinces The Doctor to make adjustments without sacrificing his theme. The Doctor lacks legal rights as Federation law does not classify him as a "sentient being". Thus he is forbidden to make any subsequent changes to the holonovel. Captain Janeway's efforts result in The Doctor being accorded the status of "artist", although not a "person". This permits him to rewrite the novel. Four months later, it is known throughout the Alpha Quadrant as a very thought-provoking piece of work. Several other EMHs, now relegated to mining duty, experience the novel.

Please state the nature…
2012 Picardo performance of the line

The Doctor's standard greeting is "Please state the nature of the medical emergency" when activated, though later modified to say whatever he chooses. In "Jetrel", it is revealed that he was given the ability to activate and deactivate himself.

The Doctor later acquires a mobile holographic emitter from the 29th century ("Future's End"). Although he has previously been confined to Sickbay or the Holodeck, the mobile emitter allows The Doctor to move about freely, making him ideal for missions where the environment would be harmful or fatal to the crew. In one notable incident, when an away team is trapped on a radioactive planet, The Doctor is able to infiltrate the people and almost single-handedly rescue the team because, as he points out, being a hologram renders him immune to the radiation, stating that "being a hologram does have its advantages." The Doctor continues his use of the emitter in Star Trek: Prodigy and Starfleet Academy.

In a 2020 interview, Picardo recalled his initial reticence to the concept of a mobile emitter:

I remember I was in [Voyager producer] Brannon Braga's office when he told me. He said, "Your character is so popular, we need to be able to put you in more scripts, in more situations and settings. What do you think?" I said, "I think it's a bad idea." This was one time when I was clearly wrong and the producers were absolutely, a hundred percent right. I conveyed to him exactly what I described to you earlier, that the character's differences define him and make him interesting to the audience. If I'm not limited to the sickbay or the holodeck, then I'll just be like anybody else. I'm glad they did it, as it gave me many more stories. But because the character had been kind of a break-out character ... whenever somebody plans to mess with a winning formula, I think anyone's reaction would be, "Are we sure we want to do that?"

The Doctor's programming evolves from his first romance, Dr. Denara Pel, to the point where he falls in love with Seven of Nine, though she is unable to reciprocate. In an alternate future episode, "Endgame", The Doctor finally adopts a name (see below) and marries a human female named Lana.

In the final episode of Star Trek: Voyager, a future version of Janeway also informs him of his later invention of a device known as a "synaptic transceiver", something that fascinates The Doctor. He is cut off by the "present" Janeway, who is abiding by the Temporal Prime Directive, before he can learn more.

In Star Trek: Prodigy, the Doctor appears in season 2 as a mentor to the young crew of the Protostar as well as the chief medical officer of the USS Voyager-A and an accomplished holo-novelist. The Doctor is also shown on occasion manning a bridge station even without becoming the Emergency Command Hologram. At the end of the series, the Doctor saves a copy of Hologram Janeway's program and helps to install her on the new USS Prodigy, upgraded to the ship's Emergency Command Hologram. He also continues his work as the Voyager-A's chief medical officer under Chakotay.

In Star Trek: Starfleet Academy, set hundreds of years after the events of Voyager, the Doctor teaches at the Starfleet Academy and is the chief medical officer of the USS Athena. It is mentioned at one point that in the nearly thousand years that have passed, the Doctor has continued his service aboard various Starfleet vessels. In the episode, "The Life of the Stars", a student from a holographic race named SAM is experiencing glitching that threatens her life, so the Doctor and Academy director Ake take her to her homeworld Kasq in hopes that SAM's Makers can save her, but she is damaged beyond their ability to repair. The Doctor reveals that SAM reminds him of his daughter Belle (Note: Previously seen in Star Trek: Voyager's "Real Life.") and the Doctor has been trying to avoid making any more attachments to deal with the emotional pain of his infinite lifespan and the numerous losses that it carries. The Doctor and Ake realize that because the Makers programmed SAM without a childhood, she lacked the resilience that comes with it and was overloaded by her trauma. SAM is rebuilt with the Doctor spending seventeen years on Kasq -- equal to two weeks on Earth -- raising her as his daughter before they return to Starfleet. In the season finale, the Doctor is revealed to have begun hiding his mobile emitter rather than wearing it out in the open and projects a hologram of the Athena being destroyed. However, the effort causes the Doctor to glitch and begin speaking in gibberish. SAM and her friends realize that the Doctor is trying to tell them how to stabilize the Omega-47 molecule and manage to decipher what he's saying. The Doctor is fully repaired after the crisis ends.

=== Emergency Command Hologram ===
The "Emergency Command Hologram", aka "ECH", is first coined by The Doctor in the episode "Tinker, Tenor, Doctor, Spy", in which he creates a program which allows him to daydream, such as adding routines which allow him to take command of Voyager – including a command uniform – in the event of the command crew being incapacitated. At the end of the episode, Captain Janeway promises to consider the idea. In the following season episode "Workforce", the idea is realized when the crew is forced to abandon ship, and The Doctor takes over command functions.

In Star Trek: Prodigy, the Doctor helps to turn Hologram Janeway into an Emergency Command Hologram which he calls "something of a rare breed."

In Star Trek: Prodigy and Starfleet Academy, the Doctor is shown to be able to man a bridge station even without becoming the ECH. While this is mainly on the Voyager-A's classified mission that only Janeway's most trusted officers know about in Prodigy, he also does so once during battle. In Starfleet Academy, the Doctor takes the tactical station when he, Nahla Ake and Jett Reno are the ship's only crewmembers.

=== Backup copies ===
The Doctor's program requires a custom-built photonic processor, and Starfleet outfitted Voyager with only two. This hardware cannot be replicated, hence the Doctor cannot be easily backed up, restored, or copied.

Voyager's computers cannot help run his photonic program, and cannot contain a usable backup of its image. The Doctor's entire program uses 50 million gigaquads ("Lifesigns" and "The Swarm" mention these limitations). The episode "Living Witness" depicts a future Delta Quadrant civilization building a museum around Voyager artifacts, including a backup EMH photonic processor, who blame Voyager for a brutal war with another culture. The civilization eventually activate the backup EMH, who is able to redeem Voyager for their alleged crimes.

=== Name ===
A recurring theme in the Doctor's life is his lack of a proper name. Starfleet did not assign a name to him. Initially, the Doctor claims that he does not want one, until the episode "Eye of the Needle", when he asks Kes to give him a name. He later adopts such names as "Schweitzer" (after Albert Schweitzer); "Shmullus" (in "Lifesigns" by Vidiian patient Dr. Denara Pel); "Van Gogh"; "Kenneth"; "Jones"; and several others. His friends suggest the famous historical Earth doctors "Galen" and "Spock". The captioned dialog of early episodes, and early promotional material for the series premiere, refer to him as "Dr. Zimmerman", after his creator, Lewis Zimmerman. The Doctor is ultimately referred to as simply "The Doctor" and addressed as "Doctor" or "Doc", which he answers to without concern, and the issue of the Doctor's name virtually disappears over the course of the series. However, in the series finale, in an alternate future timeline the Doctor has finally chosen the name "Joe" after his new wife's grandfather (and Picardo's own father). Tom Paris remarks about this choice: "it took you 33 years to come up with 'Joe'?". In Star Trek: Prodigy and Starfleet Academy, the latter of which takes place nearly a thousand years later, he continues to simply go by the Doctor.

== Characteristics ==
Before the arrival of the mobile emitter, The Doctor's holo-program was confined to sickbay, holodecks, and other areas equipped with holographic systems.

Depending on the availability of suitable holographic patterns and the capacity of his pattern buffers, The Doctor can alter his appearance. This was illustrated especially in the episode "Renaissance Man" and the Star Trek: Prodigy episode "Touch of Grey."

The Doctor is also able to download his program and personality subroutines into a humanoid with Borg implants, indirectly "possessing" that individual and gaining control over its "host" body. Such was the case when he was forced to hide within the body of Seven of Nine in "Body and Soul".

== Emergency Medical Hologram ==
The EMH is a holographic computer program designed to treat patients during emergency situations, or when the regular medical staff is unavailable or incapacitated. EMHs are a standard feature onboard all Starfleet ships, but they are there only to supplement the living medical crew during emergencies, not replace it. Programmed with all current Starfleet medical knowledge, The Doctor and all Mark I programs are equipped with the knowledge and mannerisms of historic Federation doctors, as well as the physical appearance of their programmer Dr. Lewis Zimmerman. The EMH can retain an enhanced personality over time if utilized frequently.

Mariella Scerri and Victor Grech have proposed that the EMH is "an examplar of strong AI" (a philosophical position on artificial intelligence according to which "computational states are functionally equivalent to mental states"). Another author observed that consequent to the EMH's portrayal in Voyager, "sentient computer programs embodied in a computer-generated hologram became a commonplace idea – even a convention – in subsequent fiction".

== Other appearances ==
In a minor role in the 1996 film Star Trek: First Contact, Picardo plays the emergency medical hologram of the USS Enterprise-E. Doctor Beverly Crusher activates it/him, albeit reluctantly, as a means of distracting the Borg while she and other crew members escape from the besieged sickbay. He replies, "I'm a doctor, not a doorstop", an homage to Doctor McCoy's catchphrase line "I'm a doctor, not a ..."

In the 1997 Star Trek: Deep Space Nine episode "Doctor Bashir I Presume", Picardo portrays Zimmerman, who here attempts to develop a Long-Term Medical Hologram, an upgraded version of the Emergency Medical Hologram designed for extended or permanent use in more remote or less hospitable postings.

The EMH also was a feature in the defunct Star Trek: The Experience amusement exhibition at the Las Vegas Hilton.

Picardo voiced the Doctor in the second season of the animated series Star Trek: Prodigy, in which Voyager actors Kate Mulgrew and Robert Beltran also reprised their roles. Picardo also reprises the role of The Doctor in Star Trek: Starfleet Academy as a teacher at the titular institution. The latter series is set in the 32nd century, by which time The Doctor has been active for over 900 years.

Several other versions of the EMH have appeared onscreen. The EMH Mark II, a new and upgraded EMH, is played by Andy Dick in the 1998 Voyager episode "Message in a Bottle". Star Trek: Picard features an EMH called "Emil", part of a holographic suite aboard the ship La Sirena, modeled after Captain Cristobal Rios and played by Santiago Cabrera. Star Trek: Discovery features a 32nd-century EMH known as "Eli", played by Brendan Beiser.

== Reception ==
In 2018, The Wrap ranked Voyager's EMH as the 22nd best character of Star Trek overall, noting the character as a "sarcastic, overworked hologram", one that also had time for jokes and helping crewmates.

In 2016, Wired magazine ranked the character as the 16th most important character in service to Starfleet within the Star Trek science fiction universe.

In 2016, SyFy ranked "The Doctor/Voyager EMH" as the second best of the six main-cast space doctors of the Star Trek franchise.

In 2013, Slate magazine ranked The Doctor one of the ten best crew characters in the Star Trek franchise.

== See also ==
- Artificial intelligence in healthcare, AI application to medical and healthcare data
- Elementary, Dear Data (TNG S2E3 aired December 5, 1988 – also explored holographic A.I.)
- Vic Fontaine (a holographic personality on Star Trek: Deep Space Nine)
- Arnold Rimmer, holographic character on Red Dwarf
