= Jennifer Lien =

American actress (born 1974)

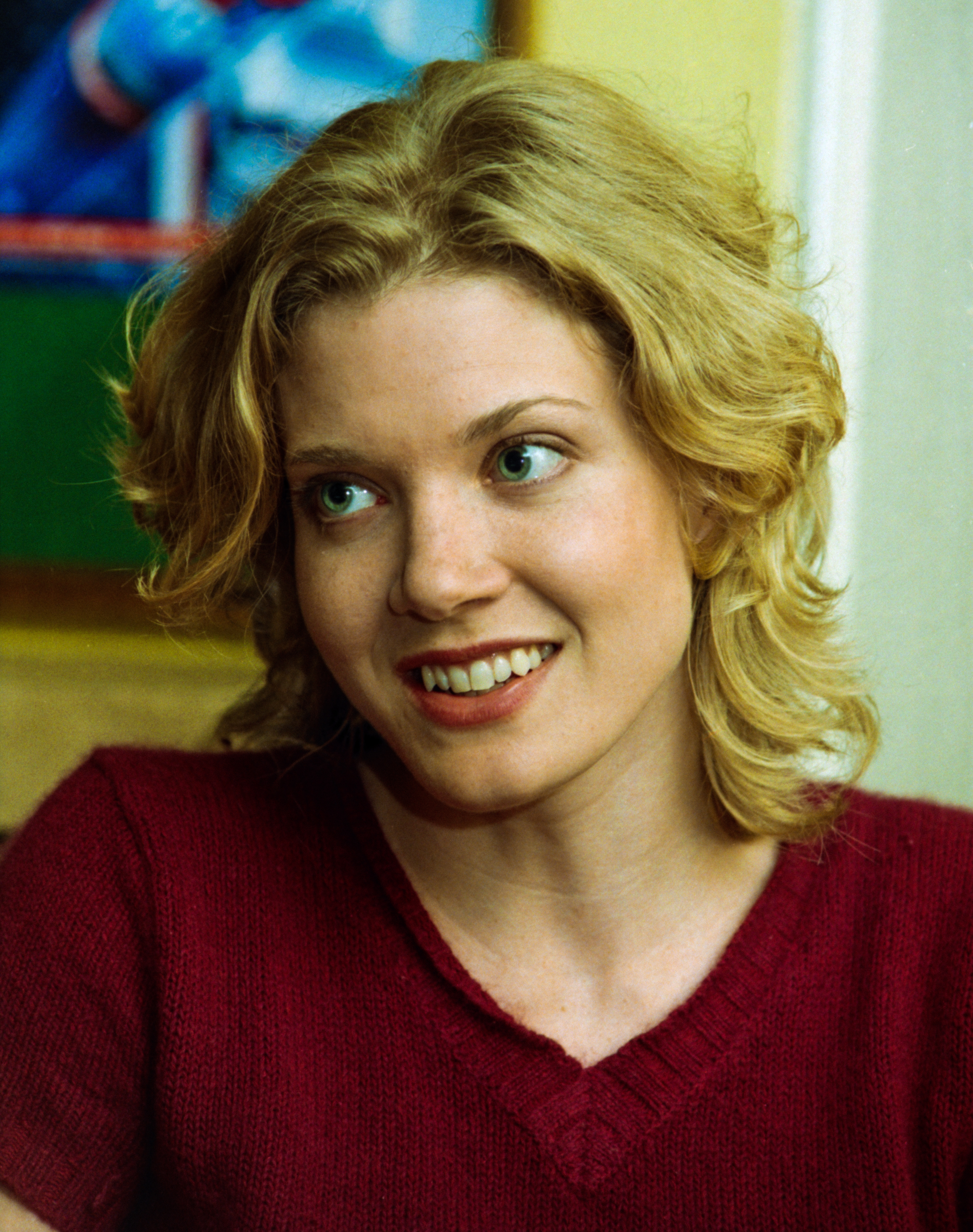
- Lien at the Generations II convention in 1996
- Born: Jennifer Anne Lien; August 24, 1974 (age 52); Palos Heights, Illinois, U.S.
- Occupation: Actress
- Years active: 1990–2001
- Known for: Star Trek: Voyager
- Spouse: Phil Hwang
- Children: 1

Jennifer Anne Lien (born August 24, 1974) is an American former actress known for playing Kes on the television series Star Trek: Voyager.

== Early life ==
Lien was born in Palos Heights, Illinois, the youngest of three children, and joined the Illinois Theatre Center at the age of 13.

In a 1992 interview, she said: "My childhood was wild because I was very uncomfortable living where I lived (the South Side of Chicago). It was very industrial—if you didn't fit in, you got your ass kicked. I was just my own person, and I adopted this really tough skin because I had to if I wanted to survive. A lot of my friends were into drugs, and I saw a lot of them die." In a 1993 interview, she said:

When I was a little kid in Chicago, I always used to pretend I was somebody else. I wrote little plays, I was a tomboy, I hung out with the guys a lot. I never had much interest in hanging out with girls. I was always writing plays or watching movies or reading books, and when I was in seventh grade, I joined the drama club and found that I could fit right in, I could relax, I could do anything I wanted. I began to think I could make a difference, I could make people happy. I felt like I made the world just a little better for a while. Then, on the advice of an eighth grade teacher, I went to acting class, and then got an agent. I did industrial films and some theatre. Soon, casting directors started hiring me and then I got an interview with the people from AW. They liked me, asked me to come to New York, so here I am!

== Career ==
Lien's first television appearance was in a bubble gum commercial playing twins. Her first appearance on a television series was as a music academy student in a 1990 episode of Brewster Place, starring Oprah Winfrey. The same year she provided her voice for the dubbed English language version of Baby Blood, a French horror film. Lien moved to New York in 1991 after she was cast as Hannah Moore on the soap opera Another World. She attended and graduated from the Professional Children's School while working on this series.

In a 1992 interview, Lien said: "A couple of years ago, I was trying to get an audition for a baseball movie, so I said that I could play baseball. We'd always played a lot while I was growing up, like in the backyard. But when I showed up at the audition, I was faced with these Goliath-like, testosterone women who could really play. I did survive the two days of training and auditions, but I basically pulled every muscle in my body!".

In 1993, Lien was cast as Roanne in Phenom, a sitcom starring Judith Light. She also participated in the recording of Adam Sandler's comedy album They're All Gonna Laugh at You! in which she played the part of the valedictorian on the track "The Buffoon And The Valedictorian", as well as one of the daughters on the track "Oh, mom..."

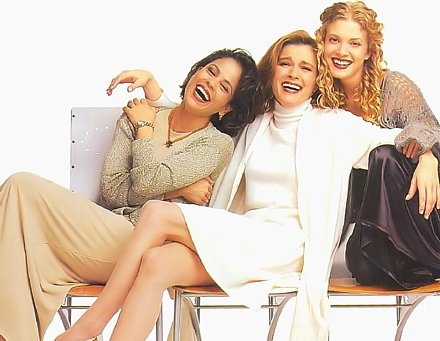
Jennifer Lien (right) with Voyager actresses Roxann Dawson (left) and Kate Mulgrew (1995)

In 1994, Lien was cast as Kes on Star Trek: Voyager. Her character was an Ocampa, a species in the Star Trek universe that lives for only eight to nine years, who joins the starship's crew after it is stranded 70,000 light-years from Earth. In the same year, Lien voiced the character Valerie Fox in the pilot episode of The Critic.

Richard Lutz wrote, "The medical personnel in Star Trek best embody the humane values embedded in this franchise; the most notable of which is Kes, thanks in large part to Jennifer Lien whose remarkable performance brought to life a beautiful child-like being (Ocampa) whose short lifespan and humanity reminds us that the most important element in a life worth living is a loving connection with our fellow human beings."

The showrunners reluctantly terminated Lien's contract as a member of Voyager's main cast due to unresolved personal issues that affected her performance. In 2000, Lien returned as a guest actor in the episode "Fury".

After Voyager, Lien appeared in the film American History X as the younger sister of Edward Norton's character. In 1998, she appeared in SLC Punk! playing Sandy, the wild girlfriend of Matthew Lillard's character. She also voiced Agent L for the first three seasons of Men in Black: The Series (1997–1999) and the first seven episodes of the fourth season before being replaced by Jennifer Martin.

=== Conventions ===
Lien has attended science fiction conventions in relation to her role as Kes when she was working on Voyager and after her film career ended. In a 1995 interview, she said about these conventions:

The conventions are something within themselves, a unique world. It's a very different experience in that I can talk to other people involved in the world of Star Trek, like authors and actors from other Star Trek shows. I also get to meet people from other SF shows, because they tend to have guests from other series at the conventions I attend. The fans love the conventions, love meeting the people involved in their favorite shows. That makes you want to give them everything you can. I try to tell them what's going on, share my laughter and tell them about the wonderful experience I've been having on Voyager. The feedback is just so positive. The fans seem to really like the show, and that's good. If they have any negative feedback, they give it to me, too, which is fine. They're usually pretty respectful, and they come up with things that are very interesting—positive and negative – and I get sucked into it.

== Personal life ==
In August 2010, Lien said she intended to work as a nutritionist after completing her studies. She has a son with husband Phil Hwang.

Between 2015 and 2018, Lien was repeatedly arrested and charged with legal offenses; several of these charges were later dropped. The court eventually ordered her to undergo mental health treatment.

== Filmography ==
=== Film ===
Year	Title	Role	Notes
1990	Baby Blood	Yanka (voice)	
1998	American History X	Davina Vinyard	
1998	SLC Punk!	Sandy	
2001	Rubbernecking	Nurse	

=== Television ===
Year	Title	Role	Notes
1990	Brewster Place	Music Academy Student	Episode: "One Small Step at a Time"
1991–1992	Another World	Hannah Moore	Recurring role; unknown number episodes
1993–1994	Phenom	Roanne	22 episodes
1994	The Critic	Valerie Fox	Episode: "The Pilot"
1995	Inside the New Adventure – Star Trek: Voyager	Herself	TV special
1995–1997; 2000	Star Trek: Voyager	Kes	72 episodes; regular cast member for three seasons
1996	Duckman	Movie Actress (voice)	Episode: "Apocalypse Not"
1996	The Real Adventures of Jonny Quest	Elise (voice)	Episode: "Eclipse"
1996	Star Trek: 30 Years and Beyond	Herself / Kes	TV special
1997	Superman: The Animated Series	Inza Nelson (voice)	Episode: "The Hand of Fate"
1997–2000	Men in Black: The Series	Agent L (voice)	7 episodes

=== Video games ===
Year	Title	Role	Notes
2001	The Lion King: Simba's Mighty Adventure	Vitani	
