= The 37's =

Star Trek: Voyager season two premiere

- Star Trek: Voyager episode
- Episode no.: Season 2 Episode 1
- Directed by: James L. Conway
- Written by: Jeri Taylor; Brannon Braga
- Cinematography by: Marvin V. Rush
- Editing by: Robert Lederman
- Production code: 120
- Original air date: August 28, 1995
- Running time: 45:49

Guest appearances
- John Rubinstein as John Evansville; David Graf as Fred Noonan; Mel Winkler as Jack Hayes; James Saito as Nogami; Sharon Lawrence as Amelia Earhart

Episode chronology
← Previous "Learning Curve"	Next → "Initiations"
- Star Trek: Voyager season 2

"The 37's" is the first episode of the second season of the American science fiction television series Star Trek: Voyager. The episode aired August 28, 1995, on UPN. Directed by James L. Conway, it was written by producers Jeri Taylor and Brannon Braga. It was originally intended to be a two-part episode to bridge between the first and second seasons, and was subsequently re-written to be a single part. Due to late changes to the final act of the episode, special effects shots of the settlers' cities could not be completed, with which Braga and series creator Michael Piller were unhappy.

Set in the 24th century, the series follows the adventures of the Starfleet and Maquis crew of the starship USS Voyager after they were stranded in the Delta Quadrant, far from the rest of the United Federation of Planets. In this episode, Voyager's crew discovers a group of humans—including Amelia Earhart (Sharon Lawrence)—who were abducted from Earth in 1937.

Lawrence was cast as Amelia Earhart after she had previously worked with Voyager's casting director on NYPD Blue. The episode shows the first time that a Federation starship lands on a planet's surface. CGI was used to show the landing struts unfold, and feet were added to the Voyager model for filming; however, the production crew were disappointed with the results and obscured them during filming. The episode received Nielsen ratings of 7.5 percent, and was given a mixed response by critics. Among the criticisms were the density of the ideas in the episode and the gimmicky appearance of Earhart. It was also said to be redeemed by the vignettes showing the crew discussing whether to leave the ship, and that the episode contained a "powerful feminist narrative".

== Plot ==
On stardate 48975.1, the crew of Voyager follows an ancient SOS to a Class L planet whose atmospheric interference requires landing the ship to investigate. On the surface, Captain Janeway (Kate Mulgrew) leads an away team to discover the source of the transmission: a Lockheed Model 10 Electra with an alien generator added to sustain the SOS. Joining Commander Chakotay's (Robert Beltran) team, the crew finds a "cryostasis chamber" containing eight humans preserved since the 1930s, including Amelia Earhart (Sharon Lawrence) and her navigator, Fred Noonan (David Graf).

After resuscitation, Noonan uses a handgun to hold the Voyager officers hostage, disbelieving their story and insisting on speaking to J. Edgar Hoover. Janeway speaks to Earhart and explains her significance to human history and to Janeway herself; Earhart, as Noonan's boss, tells him to cooperate, and some of them exit the caves. Outside, a firefight breaks out between the Voyager away team and three hooded figures. Janeway flanks the attackers and disarms them; they are human, and are surprised that Janeway is too. They had assumed the Voyager was a ship belonging to an alien species called the Briori.

Janeway learns that the Briori visited Earth in 1937 and abducted some 300 humans, bringing them to the Delta Quadrant to use as slaves. The humans later successfully rebelled against the Briori, who fled and never returned. Fifteen generations later, there are more than 100,000 humans living in three cities on the planet. The last eight un-revived humans in cryostasis were believed dead by the others, who came to revere "the 37s" as "monuments to [their] ancestors".

The settlers cannot offer the Briori technology that brought them there, as their ancestors dismantled the alien ship long ago, but they do offer to accept any of the Voyager crew into their society. Janeway thus faces a crisis of conscience over whether she can condemn all 152 crew-members on Voyager to the 70-year journey home to Earth. Yet, if the choice is presented to the crew and only some decide to continue onward, the ship cannot be staffed by fewer than 100. Meanwhile, Earhart says that as much as she admires Voyager and yearns to learn more about it, she and the other 37s feel a stronger affinity to the people on the planet and they will all be staying. In the end, Janeway allows her crew to decide for themselves, and they all opt to stay aboard.

== Writing ==
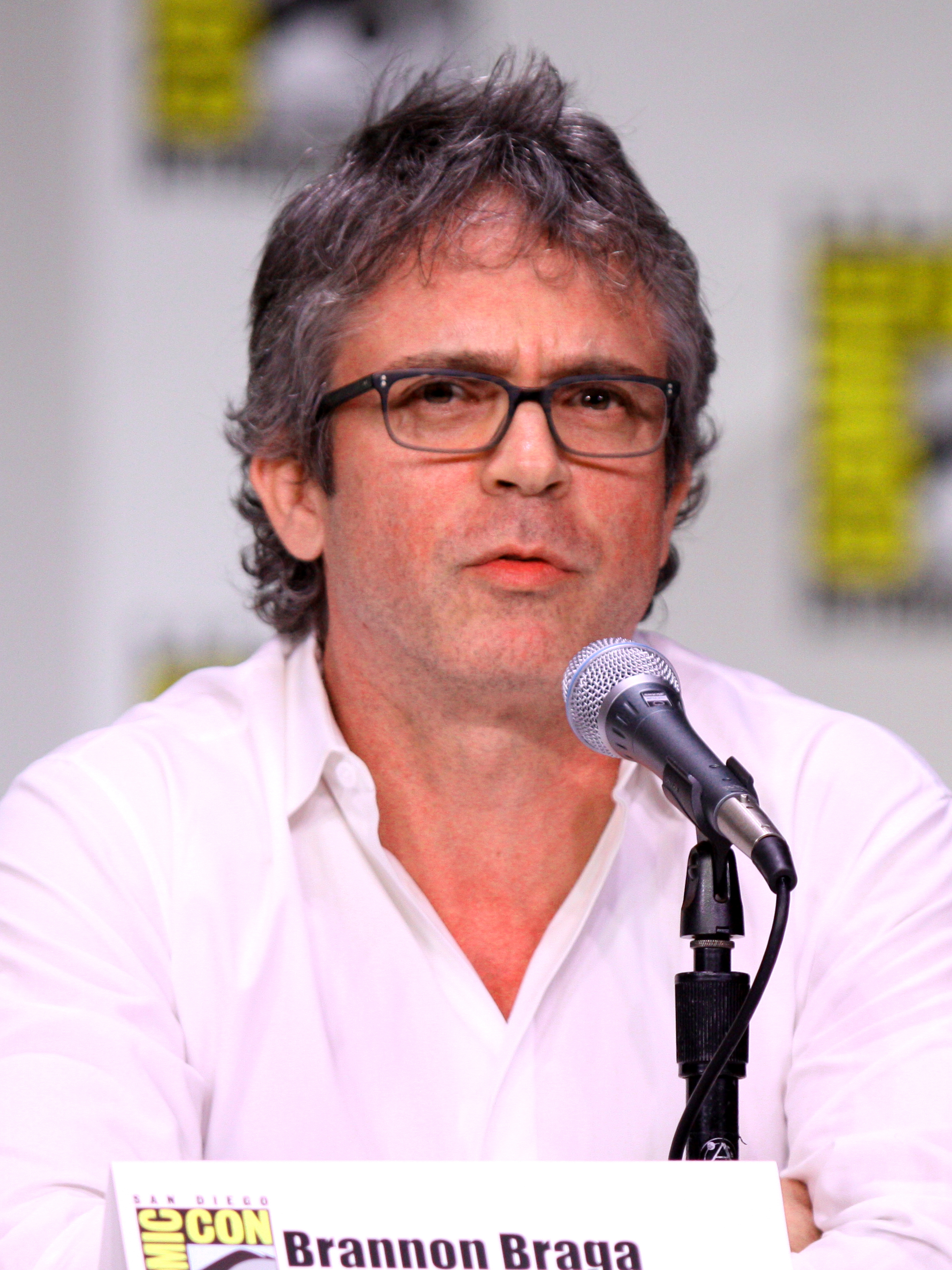
Brannon Braga in 2011

"The 37's" was written by Jeri Taylor and Brannon Braga. One of four season two episodes produced during season one (the others being "Projections", "Elogium", and "Twisted"), "The 37's" was originally intended to round out the first season of Voyager; UPN delayed these episodes to begin Voyager's second season before other networks' shows. This delay influenced a lot of decision-making about an episode that wound up pushed to the second season. Both writers wanted to end the first season by showing the Starfleet and Maquis factions aboard the ship banding together as a crew, accepting their long journey home, and "whining less about home." The landing of Voyager was also intended to take advantage of the last episode of the season as an opportunity to really wow the audience.

Braga wanted the episode to be broken into a two-part episode because of what he called "a wealth of material", what Kate Mulgrew would later describe as "every scene" containing a monologue. Nobody else on the staff wanted to end the first season on a cliffhanger, as the first half would have been. Braga therefore condensed it into one episode, and admitted to struggling with the story, pointing out dramatically different tones in the first three acts as compared to the final two. Ultimately, though, he was satisfied with the result and how the story came back around to focus on the Voyager crew in the end.

The colonists' cities, which are described in the episode as "[something] to be proud of", "amazing", and impressive, were never actually seen. Jeri Taylor explained that the last act of the episode was developed late, and between budgetary considerations and time constraints, it was impossible to realize them. Unlike co-writer Brannon Braga and series creator Michael Piller, who felt not seeing the cities was detrimental to the overall episode, Taylor did not think the compromise was "a big deal."

== Production ==
The episode, production number 120, was produced by Brannon Braga, Merri Howard, and Peter Lauritson. Robert Lederman was the editor, Marvin V. Rush was the cinematographer, and Dennis McCarthy composed the music.

=== Casting ===
Casting for "The 37's" was done by Junie Lowry-Johnson, C.S.A., and Ron Surma. Guests cast for the episode were John Rubinstein as John Evansville, David Graf as Fred Noonan, Mel Winkler as Jack Hayes, James Saito as Nogami, and Sharon Lawrence as Amelia Earhart.

==== Sharon Lawrence ====
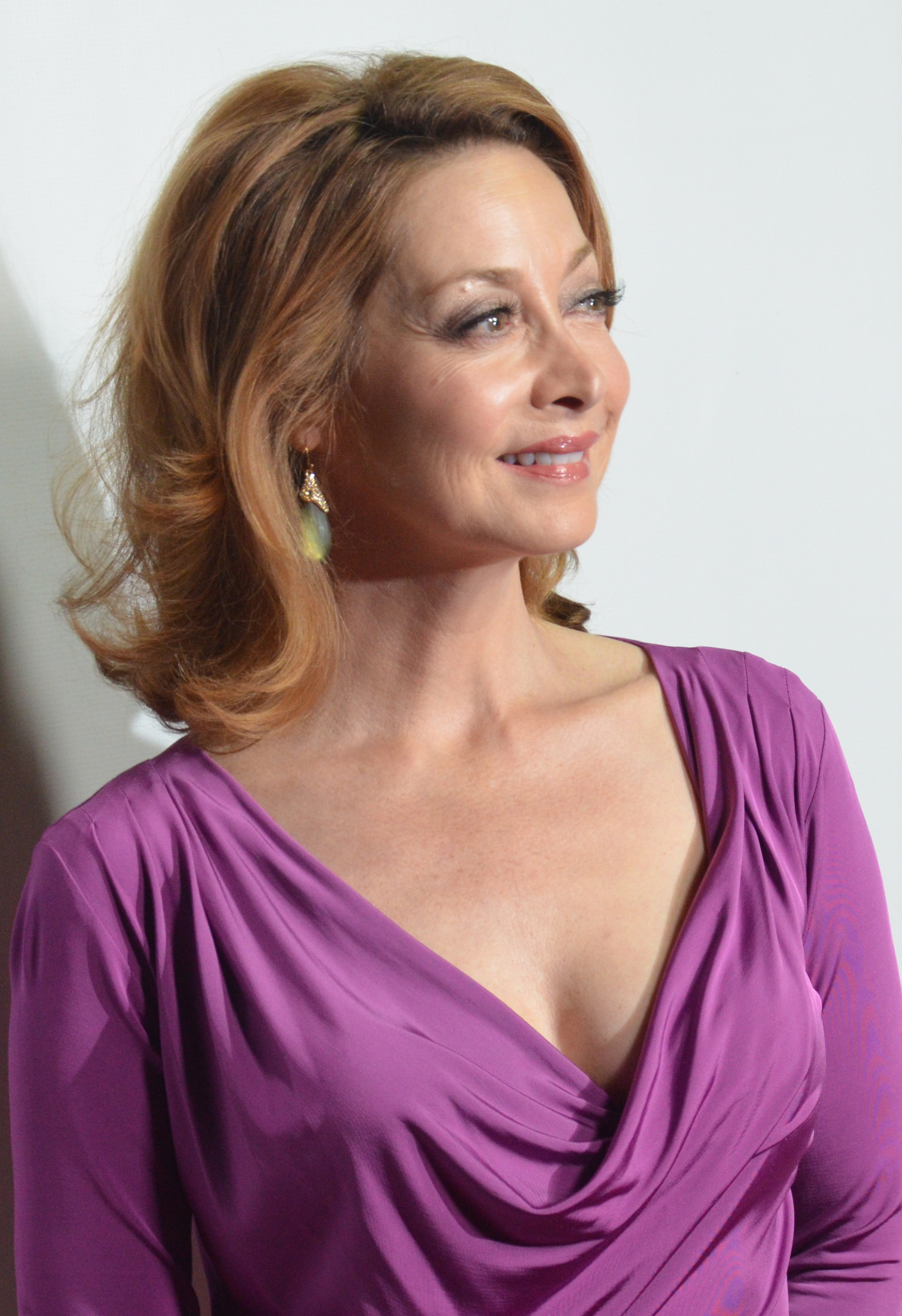
Sharon Lawrence in 2013

Lowry-Johnson was familiar with guest star Sharon Lawrence from their work together on NYPD Blue. Lawrence later expressed the belief that the qualities of her NYPD Blue character ("somebody who had … a professional strength about them") was what clinched her role as Amelia Earhart.

The actress was excited to be portraying a version of Earhart, saying that she relished the professional relationships roles like these have—as opposed to ones featuring "domestic or familial relationship[s]." In "The 37's", Lawrence was drawn to the relationship Earhart has with Janeway: two women, two professional pilots who have risen to great heights in their chosen fields. Not only did the historical character appeal to her, Lawrence also reveled in the "what-if" twist, the alternate historical story about what happened.

Lawrence grew up watching Mulgrew as Mary Ryan on the soap opera Ryan's Hope. As Lawrence came from a family where women more often than not became homemakers, Mary Ryan was an "exotic" character—with her career and life in New York City—who served as inspiration. On the set of Star Trek: Voyager the two actresses spoke frequently about their careers, their backgrounds in theatre, and the struggles of balancing home and professional requirements. Lawrence felt that her relationship with Mulgrew influenced the relationship between their characters on screen. Mulgrew praised Lawrence's performance in "The 37's", saying that "[she] really played the hell out of that role".

Lawrence praised all the cast's professionalism and their ability to cope with the "vast amount of virtually unreferenced text that they have on Star Trek".

=== Landing USS Voyager ===
==== Background ====
For the original Star Trek, to avoid the tremendous costs of landing the Enterprise every week, Gene Roddenberry invented the transporter to get the crew to and from planets cheaply and quickly. For Star Trek: Voyager, the concept of landing the Voyager was considered from the beginning as a way to differentiate the new series from those that preceded it. Episode co-writer Brannon Braga explained that it was understood from the beginning that the ship could land.

==== Effects ====
"The 37's" is the first time in Star Trek canon that a Starfleet starship is landed on a planet's surface. This was accomplished with a combination of computer-generated imagery (CGI) and physical modeling. Overhead views of the ship as it descended were CGI because it allowed the ship to descend "to a virtual pinpoint".

The initial description of the ship described its landing capability, so four small hatches on the ventral hull were included on both the ship miniature and model. However, the legs that were to emerge from those hatches had not yet been designed by "The 37's". In the 13 feet (4.0 m) allowed by the design of the ship, Rick Sternbach had difficulty designing "an articulated set of legs and footpads" that would fold out and support some of the ship's 750,000 metric tons (740,000 long tons; 830,000 short tons). Shots of the unfolding "landing struts" were CGI because motorized versions were not installed in the physical model; visual effects producer Dan Curry later said that installing such motorized elements in the five-foot (1.5 m) model was impossible due to the size. For filming the landed Voyager, miniature feet were made; however, because the producers felt the feet looked inappropriately sized for the rest of the ship, they were partially obscured by landscape in post-production.

Scenes with the landed ship were shot in Bronson Canyon. Before filming, shots were plotted out with a styrofoam, "foam-core Voyager mockup for scale and perspective." Since the canyon could not provide enough space to show the entire landed ship, the Voyager set down with the forepart of the ship visible outside the mouth of the canyon against a matte painting backdrop. Visual effects supervisor Ronald B. Moore later admitted that the composited Voyager in the canyon was far too small with respect to the shooting location, though without any visible references for the audience, and by keeping the cast between the ship and camera, it was not obvious to anyone except the visual effects crew.

== Reception ==
"The 37's" was first aired in the United States on UPN on August 28, 1995. The episode received a Nielsen rating of 7.5 percent, meaning that it was watched by 7.5 percent of all of those watching television at the time of the broadcast. It was the most watched episode of the season, receiving the highest ratings since the first-season episode "Ex Post Facto".

Kate Mulgrew later recalled that she "loved shooting every second of 'The 37's'"; she specifically praised the writing, Sharon Lawrence as Amelia Earhart, and director James L. Conway. Tim Russ (Tuvok) praised the episode as a fine example of science fiction and said he wished to see more of this type of episode. Braga felt "The 37's" had a lot of fun and cool elements such as meeting Earhart and landing the ship, but that the episode fell flat after meeting the colonists and never seeing their cities on the planet. Star Trek: Voyager co-creator Michael Piller described the premise of the episode as hokey, comparing it to "old Star Trek"; instead Piller praised the landing of the ship as "pretty amazing." Series co-creator Rick Berman described "The 37's" as "a great episode."

Cinefantastique's Dale Kutzera felt that "The 37's" had too many disparate ideas crammed into one episode. Specifically, in his view, Amelia Earhart served little purpose as the subject of Janeway's idolization (as compared to Captain Kirk and Abraham Lincoln in The Original Series episode "The Savage Curtain"), and he complained that she all but disappears from the second half of the episode. Kutzera also noted the lauded unseen cities. He awarded "The 37's" two out of four stars. In Frank Garcia and Mark Phillips' book Science Fiction Television Series, 1990–2004, "The 37's" was specifically called out for being gimmicky, noting the appearance of not only "a phony-looking, 1936 Ford truck … but long-lost aviatrix Amelia Earhart." In his book Delta Quadrant: The unofficial guide to Voyager, David McIntee described the acting in "The 37's" as watchable, and felt the episode was redeemed by the little vignettes such as Earhart and Janeway's discussion, or Harry Kim (Garrett Wang) and B'Elanna Torres (Roxann Dawson) debating whether to leave the ship. He gave the episode a 6/10 rating. Though David Greven, in his book Gender and Sexuality in Star Trek, also described the plot as hokey, he felt the episode contained "a powerful feminist narrative of shared female aspiration and daring."

== See also ==
- "North Star" (Star Trek: Enterprise) – Season-three episode
