= Projections (Star Trek: Voyager) =

- Star Trek: Voyager episode
- Episode no.: Season 2 Episode 3
- Directed by: Jonathan Frakes
- Written by: Brannon Braga
- Cinematography by: Marvin V. Rush
- Editing by: Robert Lederman
- Production code: 117
- Original air date: September 11, 1995
- Running time: 45:48

Guest appearances
- Dwight Schultz as Reginald Barclay; Majel Barrett as Computer Voice

Episode chronology
← Previous "Initiations"	Next → "Elogium"
- Star Trek: Voyager season 2

"Projections" is the 19th episode (third in the second season) of the American science fiction television program Star Trek: Voyager. Originally slated for the first season, the episode originally aired on UPN on September 11, 1995, and tells the story of the ship's holographic doctor suffering an identity crisis on the holodeck regarding whether he or the world around him is the illusion.

Brannon Braga compared "Projections" to the work of René Descartes, and wrote the episode around the premise of cogito ergo sum. Dwight Schultz as Reginald Barclay was praised by the cast and crew, especially for his on-screen chemistry with co-star Robert Picardo. The episode is considered as one of the most underrated episodes of the Star Trek franchise and received positive reviews, with only a few negative comments regarding predictability and underuse of characters.

== Plot ==
USS Voyager's holographic doctor is activated due to a red alert. Despite the computer's assertion that nobody is aboard, B'Elanna Torres soon arrives in sickbay. She informs the Doctor that the ship was attacked by Kazon and that all except herself and Captain Janeway have abandoned ship. After treating her injuries, Torres transfers the Doctor's program to the bridge, using newly-installed holographic emitters there. The Doctor treats the captain and further assists Neelix to defeat a stray Kazon in the mess, but then notices he is bleeding and feeling pain, neither of which is a function of his programming. In sickbay, making inquiries with the computer, the Doctor is told that there are no holographic programs matching his own and that he is actually Lewis Zimmerman, whom the Doctor recognizes as his programmer.

With the computer insisting that the crew of Voyager is only a collection of holographic programs, a new hologram appears in sickbay and claims to be Reginald Barclay, Doctor Zimmerman's assistant at the Jupiter Station Holoprogramming Center. Barclay explains that the Doctor is really Lewis Zimmerman and that the Voyager is just a simulation in which he has been trapped and which is inflicting radiation poisoning. To end the program and rescue Zimmerman, Barclay suggests destroying the ship before he suffers irreparable brain damage. To convince the Doctor that he is Zimmerman in a simulation, Barclay restarts the Voyager program, and the Doctor finds himself reliving the events of "Caretaker" when he was first brought online.

Convinced of Barclay's claims, the Doctor prepares to destroy the ship, when Chakotay arrives and gives an alternative story: the Doctor is indeed the Voyager EMH, but his program is stuck in the malfunctioning holodeck. The crew is trying to extricate his program and he only needs to wait; if he destroys the ship as Barclay suggests, it will prematurely end the program and the Doctor will be lost. Even though Barclay introduces Kes as Zimmerman's wife, the Doctor finally opts to believe in his holographic existence. The simulation ends and the Doctor finds himself on the holodeck; Chakotay's story was true and the Doctor is safely returned to sickbay.

== Casting ==
Casting for "Projections" was done by Junie Lowry-Johnson and Ron Surma. Episode guest stars included Dwight Schultz as Reginald Barclay and Majel Barrett as the computer's voice.

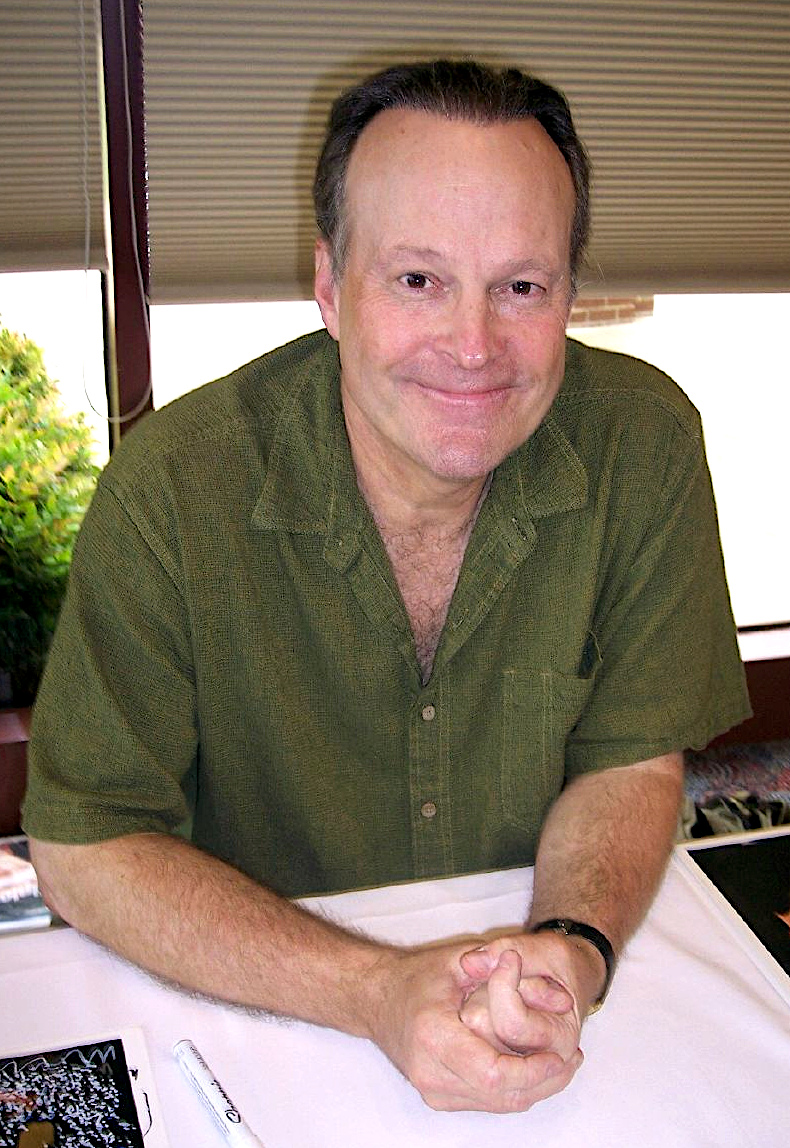
Dwight Schultz (2006)

Writer Brannon Braga came up with the idea of having Schultz appear as Lieutenant Barclay, later saying that he and Picardo worked so well together that "they should have a spin-off series." Episode director Jonathan Frakes also lauded the chemistry between the two actors. Schultz was pleased to be back on Star Trek, and was surprised to be considered for a Voyager guest appearance. On meeting Robert Picardo, he recalled they spent their time joking with each other on set, discussing mutual friends, and comparing notes on their theatre experiences. Picardo called working with Schultz "like having a party."

Before deciding on Schultz, it was originally suggested that the guest star would be LeVar Burton as Star Trek: The Next Generation's Geordi La Forge.

== Production ==
"Projections" is one of four first-season episodes that were held over by UPN to get the jump on other networks in the 1995–1996 television season. Its runtime is 45:48, and its production code number is 117.

Brannon Braga wrote the story from the initial idea of the Doctor having an identity crisis, "What if the doctor discovers that Voyager is a hologram and he is real?" From there, Braga questioned the axiom "I think, therefore I am" and what it means to be "real". Calling it a "creepy, philosophical quandary", Braga related the story of "Projections" to the work of René Descartes, where "the [character is] plagued by an evil demon out to prove he doesn't exist"; in this instance, Braga made Barclay (Schultz) the demon. The episode was written to keep the viewer guessing as to which reality was true; Braga would later say that the fun of the episode wasn't in the story itself, but in the telling of the story, "in considering all the different twists and turns along the way." The final draft of the episode was submitted on March 30, 1995.

The episode's music was composed by David Bell, cinematography was done by Marvin V. Rush, and Robert Lederman was editor.

== Reception ==
"Projections" first aired on September 11, 1995.

Writer Brannon Braga called "Projections" his favorite installment of Star Trek: Voyager in a 1996 interview with The Official Star Trek Voyager Magazine. Series co-creator and executive producer Michael Piller called the episode "a wonderful show" and "a fascinating episode", specifically praising Robert Picardo's performance alongside co-creator and executive producer Jeri Taylor. Picardo himself rated "Projections" as one of the two best Doctor-heavy stories of the second season, second only to "Lifesigns". Reviewers Lance Parkin and Mark Jones described the episode as "excellent".

In an interview with the Star Trek Communicator magazine, Jeri Taylor pointed to an ongoing Internet survey that ranked "Projections" as the third-highest ranked episode of the second season. In his book Delta Quadrant: The unofficial guide to Voyager, though David McIntee criticized the episode for its ultimate predictability and the characterization of Barclay near the end, he found the interplay between Picardo and Schultz to be overwhelmingly in the episode's favor; he rated the episode eight out of ten. Cinefantastique's Dale Kutzera was less impressed by the episode, saying it lost momentum in the middle and that it ill-used "[Star Trek]'s greatest inferiority-complex and greatest egotist." Kutzera gave the episode two out of four stars.

In 2017, Business Insider listed "Projections" as one of the most underrated episodes of the Star Trek franchise. In 2020, Gizmodo listed this episode as one of the show's 62 "must watch" episodes.
