= Resistance (Star Trek: Voyager) =

- Star Trek: Voyager episode
- Episode no.: Season 2 Episode 12
- Directed by: Winrich Kolbe
- Story by: Michael Jan Friedman; Kevin J. Ryan
- Teleplay by: Lisa Klink
- Production code: 128
- Original air date: November 27, 1995

Guest appearances
- Alan Scarfe - Augris; Tom Todoroff - Darod; Joel Grey - Caylem; Glenn Morshower - Guard

Episode chronology
← Previous "Maneuvers"	Next → "Prototype"
- Star Trek: Voyager season 2

"Resistance" is the 28th episode of Star Trek: Voyager, and the 12th episode in the second season. With a teleplay by Lisa Klink and story by Michael Jan Friedman and Kevin J. Ryan, the episode depicts the USS Voyager, a space ship stranded on the other side of the galaxy, encountering an alien planet. Starship Captain Kathryn Janeway must rescue officers Tuvok and B'Elanna Torres from an alien prison. The episode was directed by Winrich Kolbe.

The episode aired on UPN on November 27, 1995.

== Plot ==
During an away mission to obtain a chemical vital to Voyager's systems, Tuvok and B'Elanna Torres are captured and imprisoned. An injured Captain Janeway is rescued by a local man, Caylem, who believes her to be his daughter. The action takes place among Alsaurians who are contacts of Neelix, and whose planet is occupied by the aggressive Mokra.

Caylem eventually helps Janeway gain entrance into the caves where Tuvok and B'Elanna are being held prisoner and she releases them. Soon after, they are seized by the Mokra prison guards. The Mokra commanding officer, Augris, reveals that Caylem's real daughter Ralkana was shot and killed 12 years ago while attempting to rescue his wife from prison, who, unbeknown to her, had already died. Augris also indicates that Caylem has made this rescue attempt several times since then, having been rendered delusional after being unable to accept their deaths. Before Augris can interrogate Captain Janeway with the brutal methods that he used on Tuvok, Caylem, who still believes Janeway is his daughter, attacks. Caylem stabs Augris during the fight, but is shot by two prison guards before they can be stopped.

As Caylem lies dying, Janeway tells him the commander was lying about Ralkana being shot. She reminds him that his wife had forgiven him for past actions, and asks that he accept that forgiveness. "My sweet girl" are Caylem's last words before he dies in her arms, and Janeway is saddened at his death. Back on Voyager, Janeway ponders Ralkana's precious metal necklace that he had presented to her, which she kept to remind herself of his kindness.

== Production ==
Writer Lisa Klink had previously worked as a writing intern on Deep Space Nine. This was the first episode she had written for Voyager.

Joel Grey had previously worked with Kate Mulgrew in the 1985 film Remo Williams: The Adventure Begins. Prior to this, he had won both a Tony Award and an Academy Award for the stage and film versions of the musical Cabaret. The producers of Voyager had invited him to appear on several occasions, but after Mulgrew suggested he played Caylem, he agreed to make his debut appearance in Star Trek. He described the experience as "fun, fun and crazy", despite requiring a couple of hours each day to apply his prosthetic make-up. In a later interview, he noted the skilled makeup artists of Star Trek, needed for his role as an Alsaurian alien.

In the Star Trek franchise, "Resistance" is also the name of a book by J.M. Dillard, published by Simon and Schuster in 2007; the book is set in approximately the same time and period as Voyager but is not related to this episode.

== Reception ==
This had Nielsen ratings of 5.1 points when it was broadcast on television in 1995.

Keith DeCandido of Reactor rated the episode nine out of ten.
