= Maneuvers (Star Trek: Voyager) =

- Star Trek: Voyager episode
- Episode no.: Season 2 Episode 11
- Directed by: David Livingston
- Written by: Kenneth Biller
- Production code: 127
- Original air date: November 20, 1995

Guest appearances
- Martha Hackett - Seska; Anthony De Longis - First Maj Culluh; Terry Lester - Haron; John Gegenhuber - Jal Surat

Episode chronology
| ← Previous "Cold Fire" | Next → "Resistance" |
- Star Trek: Voyager season 2

"Maneuvers" is the 27th episode of Star Trek: Voyager, and the 11th episode in the second season. This episode continues the narrative of the U.S.S. Voyager and their struggle against the hostile Kazon, with a specific focus on Voyager's First Officer (former Maquis leader) Chakotay. It also features several special effect sequences with various spacecraft.

Guest star Martha Hackett reprises her role as Seska and she plays opposite Anthony De Longis cast as the Kazon sect leader First Maj Culluh. Chakotay is played by Robert Beltran.

The episode aired on UPN on November 20, 1995.

== Background and summary ==
This episode follows the story of the Federation starship Voyager which, after departing Deep Space Nine, was pulled into the Delta Quadrant on the other side of the Galaxy where they encountered hostile aliens known as the Kazon. One of Voyager's new crew-members, a Bajoran Maquis rebel named Seska, defected from Voyager to the Kazon after she was revealed to be a Cardassian spy. Seska then plots with the Kazon to capture Voyager in order to steal its technology and unite the various Kazon tribal factions.

The story arc began with "State of Flux" and continues in "Alliances" and "Basics" (parts I and II which bridge seasons 2 and 3).

"Maneuvers" was written by Kenneth Biller and directed by David Livingston. David Livingston directed many Star Trek episodes in this era, including for Star Trek: The Next Generation (1987-1994), Star Trek: Deep Space Nine (1993-1999), Star Trek: Voyager, and Enterprise. Overall he directed 62 episodes of Star Trek, including 28 for Voyager.

== Plot ==
The Voyager crew detect a Federation probe and set course for it, hoping for potential contact with the Federation. However it is a trap; the Kazon Nistrim attack with the help of the traitor Seska. (Seska was a Cardassian spy who infiltrated Chakotay's Maquis cell, joined Voyager's crew in the Delta quadrant, then left for the Kazon.) Kazon leader Maj Culluh boards Voyager and escapes with a transporter technology-module, believing Federation technology will allow him to unite and lead other Kazon sects.

Aware that Federation technology will change the balance of power in the quadrant, Janeway wishes to pursue. However, Chakotay blames himself for Seska's betrayal, as he allowed Seska to infiltrate the Maquis and eventually join Voyager. To avoid endangering the rest of Voyager's crew for his mistake, Chakotay steals a shuttle to pursue the Kazon alone. He is able to infiltrate Culluh's ship and destroy the transporter, but is captured. Culluh invites other Kazon leaders aboard and claims he has obtained Voyager's command-codes from Chakotay and can capture Voyager with ease.

Voyager pursues Chakotay and finds the Kazon fleet. Voyager engages the Kazon while Torres attempts to transport Chakotay away, but Seska blocks the transport. In response Janeway transports Culluh and the other sect leaders aboard Voyager, releasing them in return for Chakotay and the Federation shuttle. Meanwhile, Seska informs Voyager she has impregnated herself with Chakotay's DNA. After the battle Janeway commends Chakotay for his intentions, but expresses disapproval of his insubordination.

== Reception ==
This had a Nielsen rating of 5.4 points when it was broadcast in 1995.

Doux Reviews gave "Maneuvers" 2.5 out of 4. Reactor rated it 4 out of 10.
