= Initiations (Star Trek: Voyager) =

- Star Trek: Voyager episode
- Episode no.: Season 2 Episode 2
- Directed by: Winrich Kolbe
- Written by: Kenneth Biller
- Cinematography by: Marvin V. Rush
- Editing by: Tom Benko
- Production code: 121
- Original air date: September 4, 1995
- Running time: 45:54

Guest appearances
- Aron Eisenberg as Kar / Jal Karden; Patrick Kilpatrick as Razik; Tim de Zarn as Haliz; Majel Barrett as Computer Voice

Episode chronology
← Previous "The 37's"	Next → "Projections"
- List of Star Trek: Voyager episodes

"Initiations" is the second episode of the second season, and eighteenth episode overall of the American science fiction television program Star Trek: Voyager. The episode originally aired on UPN on September 4, 1995, and tells the story of Commander Chakotay's capture at the hands of a young Kazon.

To better utilize the character, this is one of several second-season episodes that focuses on Chakotay. It was written with a mind to recall the action story of Chakotay from the pilot. Writer Kenneth Biller extensively rewrote the episode after input from series co-creators Jeri Taylor and Michael Piller; whereas the Kazon originally came across as too much like the Klingons, Biller's research helped emphasize their more street-gang nature. This substantial rewrite of the episode required an overhaul of production work already invested in the episode.

Aron Eisenberg guest starred as Kar, the young Kazon warrior. Though his performance was lauded, executive producers found Eisenberg too recognizable from his recurring role on Star Trek: Deep Space Nine. Mixed reviews noted the familiarity of both Eisenberg and the shooting location of Vasquez Rocks.

== Plot ==
To commemorate the anniversary of his father's death, Commander Chakotay (Robert Beltran) takes a shuttlecraft to perform the pakra ceremony. Inadvertently straying into Kazon-Ogla space, he is attacked by a young Kazon, Kar (Aron Eisenberg), on his first mission. Chakotay destroys Kar's vessel, then beams him aboard.

Captured by a Kazon vessel soon thereafter, Chakotay learns from Kar that Kazon earn their titles through conquest or death, and he has robbed Kar of that opportunity by saving him. The vessel's commander Razik (Patrick Kilpatrick) speaks with Chakotay, explaining his disservice to Kar and that the young Kazon is scheduled for execution. When later presented with a weapon to kill Kar as a lesson to other Kazon youth, Chakotay holds Razik hostage in exchange for his shuttle. Kar, seeing no future or opportunities with the Ogla, flees with Chakotay. Unable to elude the Kazon, Chakotay beams himself and Kar to a nearby Class-M moon, a Kazon training ground. Kar, having eschewed an opportunity to kill Chakotay in his sleep, later explains how he has no options open to him and admits that Chakotay may be his only friend now.

Meanwhile, having tracked the shuttle's probable course, Captain Janeway (Kate Mulgrew), Lieutenant Tuvok (Tim Russ), and Kes (Jennifer Lien) proceed to the moon's surface to rescue Chakotay. On the moon, they meet up with Razik and his men who offer to lead the away team to Chakotay. When Chakotay and Kar detect their approach, Chakotay offers to help Kar earn his name by becoming his prisoner. Coordinating with Voyager to prepare for resuscitation, Chakotay tells Kar to shoot him; Kar instead shoots Razik, earning his Ogla name of Jal Karden and promoting Razik's second-in-command, Haliz (Tim de Zarn). The Ogla allow the Voyager crew to leave, with Karden's promise that he will kill Chakotay if they meet again. Later, when performing his pakra ceremony aboard Voyager, Chakotay prays to his father to watch over Karden.

== Writing ==
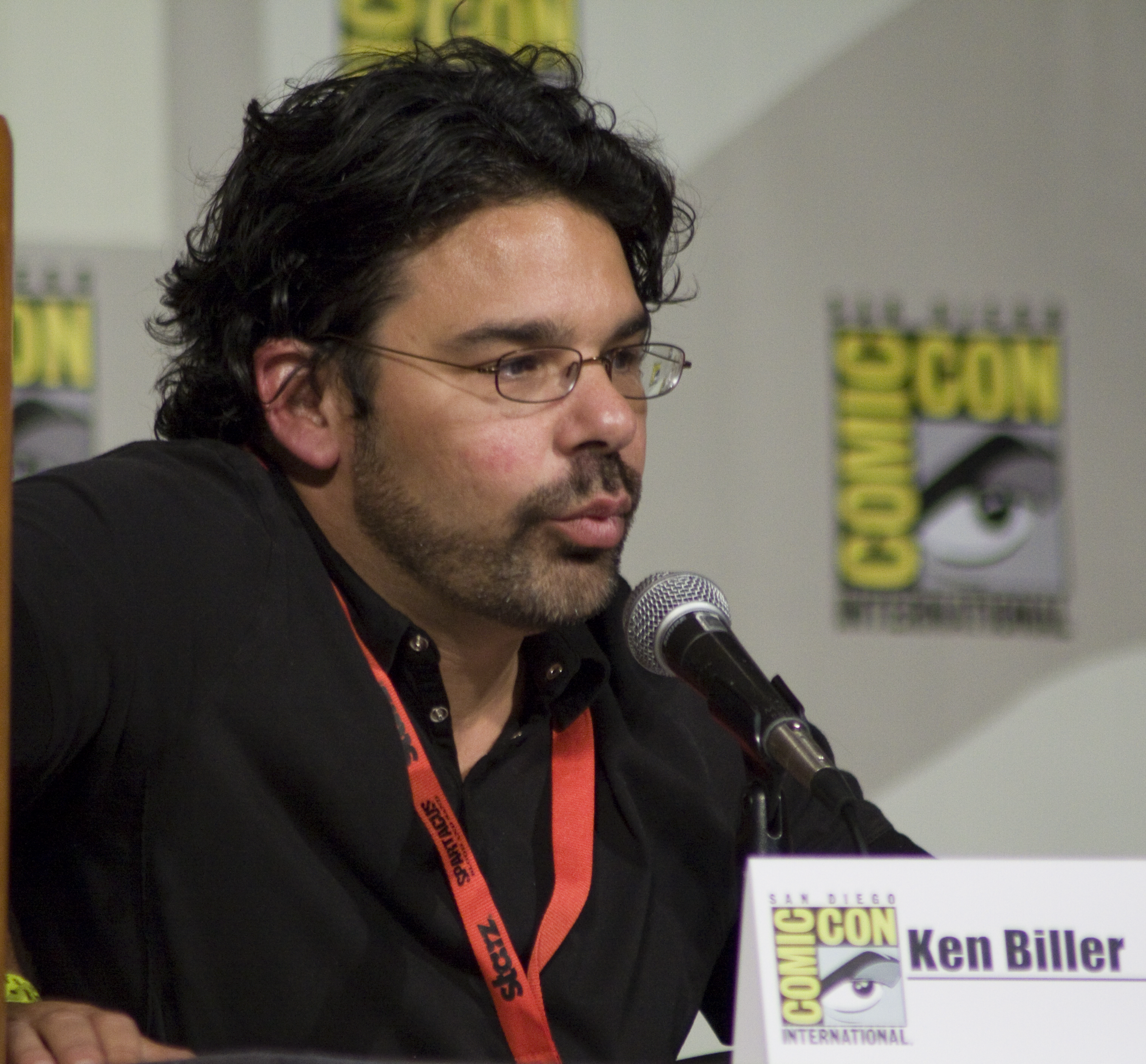
Kenneth Biller (2009)

"Initiations" is Kenneth Biller's first solo writing credit on Star Trek: Voyager; he summarized the episode as "the Kazon put a hit out on Chakotay". The Chakotay-focused episode was meant to correct what co-creator and executive producer Jeri Taylor felt was an underutilization of the character in the first season. Biller felt the character needed more action stories, as shown in the pilot, and wrote "Initiations" to address that. Producer Winrich Kolbe did not care for the aspects of Chakotay's character that the episode played up; where the episode focused on his Native American heritage, Kolbe felt it should have emphasized his Maquis aspects.

Executive producer Michael Piller was displeased with the depiction of the Kazon in Biller's first draft of the episode; where they were supposed to be analogous to street gangs in Los Angeles, they were instead "coming across as warmed-over Klingons." In addition to Jeri Taylor's already extensive notes on the draft, Piller suggested Biller get in touch with actual gang members or a police officer who could better clue the writer into street gang culture for the episode. Instead, Biller picked up a copy of Monsta, a book by convicted murderer and former gang member "Monsta" Cody. The book's insight into gang life and culture was a guiding light for Biller's second draft, which he worked up with Piller, endeavoring to set the Kazon apart "from Romulans, Cardassians, and Klingons."

The final draft of the episode was submitted on July 10, 1995.

== Casting ==
Casting for "Initiations" was by Junie Lowry-Johnson and Ron Surma. Guest stars included Aron Eisenberg as Kar / Jal Karden, Patrick Kilpatrick as Razik, Tim de Zarn as Haliz, and Majel Barrett as the computer's voice.

=== Eisenberg ===
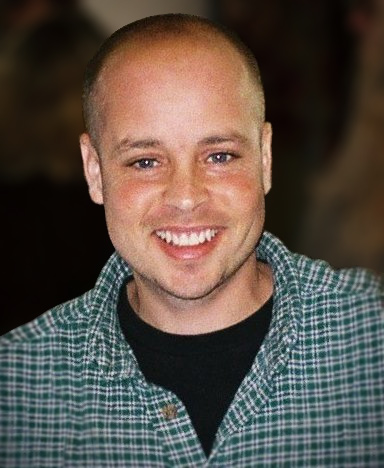
Aron Eisenberg (1998)

Playing a recurring character on sister series Star Trek: Deep Space Nine (DS9), Eisenberg quelled rumors that he was given the part simply because of his Star Trek heritage. He emphasized that he read for the part like any other actor, and felt that he was chosen because the Star Trek: Voyager crew could not find a child actor who could meet muster, nor an adult actor who looked young enough for the part. In an interview with Star Trek: The Official Monthly Magazine, Eisenberg said that he worked very hard on the episode, and that his musculature was a boon to playing "a warrior kid." Fellow DS9 actor Max Grodénchik was his acting coach for "Initiations". On Kar, Eisenberg played the character on the other end of the spectrum from his Nog character, so much so that he wasn't worried about any of Nog's characterizations or idiosyncrasies showing through.

Eisenberg fondly recalled working on "Initiations" both because of his familiarity with much of the crew who had previously worked on DS9, as well as the opportunity to "goof around" with Robert Beltran (Chakotay) on set. He would later tell Cinefantastique that he "had a blast" working on the episode, especially the opportunity to play someone "really trying to kill someone." Beltran would later compare the fun they had on set as akin to working with Don Rickles and that Eisenberg was "very quick-witted and not afraid to cut you down."

Co-creator and executive producer Michael Piller called the casting of Eisenberg a "big mistake". Because Eisenberg also played the recurring Ferengi character Nog on Star Trek: Deep Space Nine, and though he was under heavy prosthetics, his voice was too recognizable to fans of both shows. Piller praised his performance, but felt it was a casting mistake to crossover the actor in both shows. Fellow co-creator and executive producer Jeri Taylor echoed Piller's sentiments saying that though Eisenberg was the best actor that auditioned for the part, he was too recognizable as Nog and distracted the viewers. As for Eisenberg himself, he dismissed online complaints about his recognizability saying, "'Come on people, it's the same person.' I was really proud of it."

== Production ==
"Initiations" (production code 121) is 45:54 long. Marvin V. Rush was the cinematographer, Tom Benko was the editor, and the music was composed by Dennis McCarthy.

Biller and Piller's dramatic second draft changes required changes in the episode's sets and shooting schedule, what Piller described as "[having] to change the whole thing overnight." The chaos of the changes prompted a meeting with Piller and the production staff where he defended the upheaval as response to improving the script and overall episode.

In Robert Beltran's portrayal of Chakotay in the episode, the actor bucked what he felt was viewers' expectations. Instead of playing a "mad" Chakotay, he toned it down and made it more of about trying (and failing) to change Kar through kindness and tenderness.

== Release ==
Originally intended to open the second season, "Initiations" was bumped to second by "The 37's". The episode aired on UPN on September 4, 1995.

== Reception ==
Cinefantastique's Dale Kutzera gave the episode 2.5 out of 4 stars in his review, saying that the episode failed to define the Kazon as an enemy. Kutzera's suspension of disbelief was rocked by the casting of Aron Eisenberg (who Kutzera felt was too synonymous with his DS9 character, Nog), and the reuse of the immediately-identifiable Vasquez Rocks shooting location. In his book Delta Quadrant: The unofficial guide to Voyager, David McIntee also lamented Eisenberg's recognizability from his other Star Trek series. For the episode itself, McIntee felt the first half has some interesting potential in the cultural conflicts presented, but that it fell too hard on the "enemies-must-team-up-to-survive" cliché; he gave the episode a 7 out of 10, calling it "watchable, and occasionally quite strong." Reviewers Mark Jones and Lance Parkin pointed out continuity errors, and thought the episode was an occasionally formulaic "efficient piece of storytelling".

Robert Beltran (Chakotay) said that "Initiations" "summed up in one episode basically what Chakotay is about as a person," and that it was one of three Chakotay-centric episodes (including "Tattoo" and "Maneuvers") he really enjoyed. Jeri Taylor called the episode "reasonably successful."
