= State of Flux =

- Star Trek: Voyager episode
- Episode no.: Season 1 Episode 11
- Directed by: Robert Scheerer
- Story by: Paul Robert Coyle
- Teleplay by: Chris Abbott
- Production code: 111
- Original air date: April 10, 1995

Guest appearances
- Martha Hackett - Seska; Josh Clark - Lt. Carey; Anthony De Longis - First Maje Culluh

Episode chronology
← Previous "Prime Factors"	Next → "Heroes and Demons"
- Star Trek: Voyager season 1

"State of Flux" is the eleventh episode of Star Trek: Voyager. Recurring Voyager characters Seska and Lt. Carey star, along with the show's main cast, in an episode that sees the return of the Kazon aliens previously introduced in "Caretaker".

This episode features events with Star Trek's replicator technology.

This episode aired on UPN on April 10, 1995.

== Plot ==
The crew of Voyager are foraging for food on a planet, when the ship detects a cloaked Kazon vessel and they are ordered to return. Chakotay is left behind to search for Seska. As soon as he finds her, he is fired on by two Kazons, who are stunned by return phaser fire, allowing Chakotay and Seska to escape. Back on Voyager, Seska serves Chakotay mushroom soup and tells him that she and other Maquis raided Neelix's kitchen to make the soup. Chakotay is furious and threatens harsh disciplinary measures. Seska, having once been romantically involved with Chakotay, attempts to placate him, but Chakotay rebuffs her and she leaves.

Moments later, Voyager detects a distress call from a Kazon ship. On investigation, they discover that a piece of equipment on the Kazon ship has caused a catastrophic failure on board, killing all but one of the crew, who is comatose. Because the equipment bears similarities to Starfleet technology, the crew realize that the Kazon must have obtained it from someone on Voyager, and Seska falls under suspicion. Seska takes matters into her own hands and beams over to the Kazon ship, explaining that she must retrieve the equipment to prove her innocence. While on the ship, Seska is injured and is reprimanded by her superiors when she returns.

Captain Janeway realizes that the comatose Kazon might be the only chance of finding out how the technology came into the Kazon's possession. Another Kazon ship arrives, whose captain, Culluh, demands to see his comrade. Culluh and his bodyguard arrive in sickbay where the Doctor is treating their compatriot. Suddenly, Culluh's bodyguard kills the patient. Disgusted, Janeway orders both Kazons off Voyager.

Kes finds Seska has Cardassian blood, which Seska claims was the result of a bone marrow transplant from a friendly Cardassian woman. Investigations reveal that a message was sent to the Kazon from Engineering, and from the time of the message the two most likely suspects are Seska and Lt. Carey. The senior crew set a trap to identify the traitor, and Seska falls for it. She explains that the Kazon are a powerful race in this quadrant and by giving them technology, Voyager will gain a powerful ally. She escapes to a Kazon ship using a pre-programmed beam-out. Janeway orders a pursuit, but more Kazon ships arrive and Voyager retreats.

Later, Chakotay asks Tuvok if he was naive for being fooled by Seska. Tuvok admits being fooled as well, reassuring Chakotay.

== Production ==
This episode was filmed in Bronson Canyon in Griffith Park in California.

== Reception ==
This had Nielsen ratings of 6.5 when it was aired in April 1995.

"State of Flux" is noted in Star Trek and Sacred Ground: Explorations of Star Trek, Religion, and American Culture as an example of an episode that shocks the viewer by having a character go against the Federation's Starfleet.

Out of the 16 (15) episodes in Season 1 of Star Trek: Voyager which was broadcast in the spring of 1995, only "Eye of the Needle" and "Caretaker" (Part I and Part II) had a higher rating than "State of Flux" on TV.com as of 2018. Both of those episodes had a rating of 8.7 surpassing "State of Flux" which had a rating of 8.5 as of 2018. "State of Flux", with its rating of 8.5 was higher than "Faces" and "Time and Again" which were rated 8.3 as of 2018.

In 2020, io9 listed this as one of the seven "must-watch" episodes of Star Trek: Voyager's first season.

In 2020, The Digital Fix felt this episode had some of the "most ambitious storytelling" in season one of Star Trek: Voyager along with "Prime Factors" .
