= Kazon =

Fictional species portrayed as interstellar gangsters in Star Trek: Voyager

Anthony De Longis as Jal Culluh, the primary Kazon character featured on Star Trek: Voyager

The Kazon (/ˈkeɪzɒn/) are a fictional alien race in the Star Trek franchise. Developed by Star Trek: Voyager series' co-creators Rick Berman, Michael Piller, and Jeri Taylor, the Kazon serve as the primary antagonists during the show's first two seasons. They are represented as a nomadic species divided into eighteen separate sects, and characterized by their reliance on violence. A patriarchal society, the Kazon have a low opinion of women, and place pride in men becoming warriors and proving themselves in battle. The Kazon storylines frequently revolve around the attempts of Jal Culluh and his Kazon sect to steal technology from the USS Voyager, with the assistance of former Voyager ensign Seska. During the second season, the Voyager crew uncover more about the alien species' history and culture through a temporary truce. In their final major appearance, the Kazon successfully commandeer Voyager, but are eventually forced to surrender and retreat. The alien species have minor cameo appearances and references in the show's subsequent seasons, and have also been included in Star Trek Online and novels set in the Star Trek universe.

Inspired by gangs like the Crips and Bloods, the Kazon were seen by the show's co-creators as an apt metaphor for the fears and anxieties surrounding cities and gangs during the seasons' broadcast. The Kazon were developed as one of three new alien species that could be expanded as recurring antagonists. The other two were the Vidiians and the Sikarians. Michael Westmore was the primary make-up supervisor involved in the creation of the Kazon's appearance. Piller originally planned to cast young actors between the ages of eighteen and twenty-five exclusively, but decided to cast older and more experienced performers as they tested better during the audition process. Voyager's writing team dedicated a large portion of season two to the development of the alien species, with Piller writing a paper on them that would be used for the development of the Kazon-centric episodes. The Kazon were removed from the series following the season three premiere as the co-creators felt that their continued presence would strain the credibility of Voyager's journey home.

Critical response to the Kazon was generally negative. Some reviewers praised their ability to capture Voyager and maroon its crew on a desolate planet, while others felt they were poorly developed copies of Klingons and that the second season focused too much on them. The Kazon were included on several lists ranking the worst villains in Star Trek history, and were cited as an example of the racist implications in the franchise's alien species. During her re-watching of the series, TrekToday's Michelle Erica Green provided extensive criticism of the alien species, questioning the decision to feature them as the primary antagonists instead of the Vidiians, and Captain Kathryn Janeway's refusal to share technology with them. The Kazon were also poorly received by the show's cast members, who did not find them to be strong villains or compelling additions to the narrative.

== Appearances ==
=== Star Trek: Voyager ===
The Kazon appear as the principal antagonists for Star Trek: Voyager's first two seasons. Introduced in the series premiere "Caretaker", they are shown as oppressors of the Ocampa, another alien race. The Ocampa Kes (Jennifer Lien) is first seen as a slave to the Kazon, and the Talaxian Neelix (Ethan Phillips) is revealed to have completed business deals with the alien species in the past. After seeing a display of the advanced technology on USS Voyager, specifically the replicator and transporter, the Kazon develop schemes to steal these machines and incorporate them into their own ships. Captain Kathryn Janeway (Kate Mulgrew) refuses to provide the hostile alien species with any information regarding Voyager's technology because of her fear of upsetting the power dynamics in the Delta Quadrant and thus violating the Prime Directive. Over subsequent episodes, the crew of the Maquis cell led by Chakotay (Robert Beltran)—which had been pursued by Voyager into the Delta Quadrant—merge with Voyager's Starfleet crew. In "State of Flux", the Voyager crew encounter Jal Culluh (Anthony De Longis), a Kazon sect leader and the series' primary Kazon character. In this episode, Voyager's ensign Seska (Martha Hackett) is revealed to be a Cardassian agent who had infiltrated Chakotay's Maquis cell, subsequently objecting to the merging of crews, and Janeway's refusal to violate the Prime Directive. Seska secretly funnels information to the Kazon in order to build an alliance with the alien species and expedite Voyager's journey home. After being caught while attempting to deliver replicator technology to the Kazon, Seska leaves Voyager to join them and becomes Culluh's lover and primary adviser.

During "Initiations", Chakotay becomes entangled with Kar (Aron Eisenberg), a young Kazon attempting to complete a rite of passage, and tries to act as a mentor for him. In "Maneuvers", Seska sets up a trap, resulting in the Kazon stealing a transporter module from Voyager. She advises Culluh to engineer the technology into the Kazon ships and use it to unite all Kazon sects with him as leader. Chakotay goes on a solo mission aiming to recover the technology, but is captured and tortured by Seska and Culluh. The Voyager crew rescue Chakotay, only to discover that Seska had extracted his DNA and used it to impregnate herself. Following this turn of events, Janeway attempts to form an alliance with the Kazon to secure safe passage through their area of space. During this process, the crew meet with the Trabe, an alien species who were persecuted by the Kazon following a violent feud. Janeway decides to ally with the Trabe and sets up a peace conference at the suggestion of Mabus (Charles O. Lucia), a Trabe leader. However, the Voyager crew discover that the Trabe mistreated the Kazon in the past and want to use the meeting as a trap to assassinate the Kazon leaders. Janeway stops the massacre from occurring, but relations between Voyager, the Kazon, and the other alien species in the Delta Quadrant are further strained as a result.

The Kazon make minor appearances in "Threshold", "Dreadnought", and "Lifesigns" as Seska helps them construct a plan to commandeer Voyager. In "Investigations", Neelix notices that one of the ship's crew is sending coded messages to the Kazon, and he uses his morning news program to track down the traitor. Tom Paris (Robert Duncan McNeill) helps Neelix by exhibiting poor and aggressive behavior to set up an appearance that he is willing to sabotage Voyager to elicit contact from the traitor. Neelix discovers that Michael Jonas (Raphael Sbarge), a Voyager crewmember who was formerly part of Chakotay's Marquis cell, is feeding Seska information regarding warp technology; Jonas is then killed in a fight with Neelix. The two-part episode "Basics" serves as the final major storyline for the Kazon in the series. Seska sends Voyager a distress call following the birth of her child and Culluh's discovery that he was not the father. Chakotay convinces Janeway and the rest of the crew to rescue Seska and his son from the Kazon, but they discover it is a trap to ambush Voyager. The Kazon takes control of the starship and maroons its crew on a seemingly desolate planet; The Doctor (Robert Picardo) and the troubled crewman Lon Suder (Brad Dourif) are the only two crew members left on board Voyager. The Doctor reveals to a disappointed Seska that Culluh, not Chakotay, is the father of her child. The Voyager crew retake the ship after Suder sacrifices himself to sabotage its phaser weapon systems. Seska is killed by an exploding console in the ensuing fight, and Culluh takes his child and leaves with the rest of the Kazon.

Even though the Kazon are not prominent beyond "Basics", they are referenced in subsequent seasons. In the fourth season, Seven of Nine (Jeri Ryan) reveals that the Borg never assimilate the Kazon, whom they refer to as species 329 and "unworthy of assimilation" due to a belief they would "detract from perfection". A Kazon crew member was included on a holographic reconstruction of Voyager as a warship. The Kazon also appear in both "Relativity" and "Shattered", which deal with time travel. In both episodes, characters visit the point at which Seska and the Kazon were in control of Voyager.

=== Other appearances ===
The Kazon are included in Star Trek Online, a massively multiplayer online role-playing game (MMORPG) developed by Cryptic Studios based on the Star Trek franchise. In the game, which is set in the 25th century, 30 years after the events of Star Trek: Nemesis, the sect Kazon-Nistrim is classified as a rising power after a new leader took control away from Culluh. He is identified as "hungry for power and eager to make a name for himself" and "more cunning and intelligent than most Kazon".

The Kazon also appear in novels based on the Star Trek franchise, including Mosaic and Pathways, both written by Star Trek: Voyager co-creator Jeri Taylor. In Mosaic, the Kazon launch an ambush against Voyager by drawing the crew into battle against a Kazon warship in a dense nebula. At the same time, Kazon warriors pursue an away team, led by Tuvok, which was tasked to explore a wilderness planet. The novel focuses on Janeway's dilemma whether to help the away team or the ship's crew, and is intercut with flashbacks to her childhood and training at Starfleet Academy. During the events of Pathways, Kes recounts her first encounters with the Kazon. The Kazon also appear in the mirror universe presented in Keith DeCandido's short story "The Mirror-Scale Serpent", published in the collection Obsidian Alliances. In this universe, Voyager was never stranded in the Delta Quadrant. Rather than being rescued by Neelix and Voyager's crew, Kes uses her psionic powers to kill all of her Kazon captors.

In 1996, an action figure of a Kazon was released as part of a second wave of Playmates Toys' Star Trek merchandise. The same year, Applause produced a ceramic mug whose design was based on the face of a generic Kazon male. Several figures on Kazon spacecraft were released by Revell, such as those for the raider ship and torpedo. Revell included the raider ship figurine as a part of a three-piece set, along with ones for a Maquis ship and USS Voyager.

== Characteristics ==
=== History and politics ===
In the Star Trek universe, prior to the arrival of Voyager in the Delta Quadrant, hostilities between the Trabe and the Kazon led to the Trabe keeping them subjugated. Violence between the Kazon was encouraged to limit the risk of them rising up against the Trabe. Before being conquered by the Trabe, the Kazon were the most advanced society in the quadrant. On stardate 2346, Jal Sankur united the sects into the Kazon Order or the Kazon Collective to overthrow the Trabe. The Kazon stole the Trabe's technology and ships and, rather than settle on a new homeworld, became a nomadic species. After achieving independence from the Trabe, the Kazon continued to fight among themselves for control of resources and technology.

In Star Trek: Voyager, the Kazon are known under the collective title of the Kazon Order, but the species are also separated into various sections. While the official Star Trek website lists the Kazon as having eighteen sects, the episode "Initiations" represents the number of sects as highly unstable and changing every day. Only eight groups were named in Star Trek: Voyager: Kazon-Halik, Kazon-Ogla, Kazon-Oglamar, Kazon-Relora, Kazon-Nistrim, Kazon-Mostral, Kazon-Hobii, and Kazon-Pommar. The sects are portrayed as "blood enemies" who rarely make attempts at diplomacy or forge alliances. At the time that Voyager passed through Kazon-occupied space, the Kazon-Ogla and Kazon-Relora were the most powerful of the eight, controlling the most members and ships. A Kazon who does not belong to a sect is viewed as a "Goven" or an outcast. The title "first maje" is used to reference the leader of a sect. The political structure of the Kazon is built around "political killings inside the sects as well as between sects", with peace perceived as an impossible construct.

=== Culture and technology ===
During Star Trek: Voyager, Kazon society was represented as patriarchal as males reacted negatively to orders from women. Kazon women are never shown on the series, and are only referenced through dialogue by the Kazon men. Young Kazon males are raised as warriors, undergoing a rite of passage ritual to earn their adult names. The honorific title "Jal" given to a young Kazon male marks their transition into adulthood; it is given either when the boy kills an enemy in battle or dies in battle. Those who fail this rite of passage are punished either by execution or public shaming. Fathers and sons are expected to have an emotionally distant relationship, with any signs of affection between them being considered shameful.

Scholars Christina Niculescu and Yonit Nemtzeanu analysed Kazon culture to explore political correctness and themes of racial prejudice in Star Trek: Voyager. They determined that the Kazon are characterized as primitive/inferior, savage, and criminal, and argue that the Kazon's appearance and behavior were designed to elicit a negative response from the audience. They described the Kazon's clothing as resembling that of guerrilla warriors, and their hair and faces as "wild" and "threatening". Though the Kazon are not shown as having a standing army, they are defined as a militaristic society. Niculescu and Nemtzeanu noted that the Kazon dialogue is marked by its frequent use of violent language. According to Seska, Kazon medicine is rudimentary and "primitive". Even though the Kazon are the only classified species that the Borg refuse to assimilate, Janeway included in her reports that they are a "tricky and dangerous foe".

In Star Trek: Voyager, the Kazon's military focus is heavily contrasted with the humanistic United Federation of Planets. Through the resources taken from the Trabe, the Kazon possess energy weapons, primarily phasers and tractor beams, and deflector shields. They are unaware of transporters and replicators until their first meeting with Voyager's crew. The Kazon are primarily shown using one of two types of spacecraft: raider ships and carrier vessels. The raider ships are considered minor threats by Voyager's crew, but the carrier ships are viewed as more dangerous. Even though the Kazon's weapons are inferior to those on Voyager, the Starfleet crew's inability to resupply leaves them vulnerable to attacks. The Kazon vessels are visually represented as "dark, strictly functional" and without "any of the embellishments known from the bright, slick Federation ships". The ships are adorned with only the skulls and trophies of conquered enemies. In Star Trek Online, players can use the Kazon heavy raider and have access to its bridge. The MMORPG's official website promotes the craft's greatest strength as "its maneuverability and versatility". The site also mentions that the Kazon have improved their technology since their encounter with Voyager by scavenging more advanced materials from other species.

== Background ==
=== Concept and creation ===
Prior to the announcement of a new Star Trek incarnation, Star Trek: Voyager's co-creators Rick Berman, Michael Piller, and Jeri Taylor conceived the basic concepts and characters during secret developmental meetings. The Kazon were originally created as a part of the show's basic premise of Voyager's crew being stranded in the Delta Quadrant. Berman, Piller, and Taylor reasoned that the characters would be traveling through an area of space controlled by a new alien race, serving as the show's primary antagonists, and created the Kazon to fill this role.

The Kazon were inspired by Los Angeles gangs, and were referenced in a "shorthand 'Crips' and 'Bloods' fashion". The idea for the Kazon as warrior sects, as opposed to a unified race, was introduced by Taylor, who drafted them as "three gangs, with constantly shifting relationships and allegiances. Just as we think we have sorted it out, the balance shifts again." While discussing the Kazon's original inspiration, Taylor viewed them as a way "to address the tenor of our times and what [...] was happening in our cities and recognizing a source of danger and social unrest". Piller further described the premise for the Kazon as rooted in gang violence and warfare by clarifying: "Our intention was to create a sort of disorganized anarchy, them-against-them as much as them-against-us."

In a meeting dated August 17, 1993, Taylor wrote a story outline for the pilot episode "Caretaker" and established the Kazon (then identified as the Crips) as a "gang which, in conflict with two other gangs, competes for territory in this region of space". Taylor's notes suggest that the show's co-creators considered having the Crips reach a truce with the main characters, which would anger another one of the gangs (then titled the Blood) and lead to them being the primary antagonists. This idea was later dropped at a meeting on September 10 of the same year. In the first draft of the script for "Caretaker", Piller named the alien species the "Gazon" and wrote the following description of them:

They are a lean, scrawny people who dress in an assortment of unkempt clothing. Some are in nothing more than rags. Their skin is parched and desiccated; the sun has produced blotches and sores on some. This appears to be a camp of people barely able to survive, bereft of creature comforts and living a harsh, hardscrabble life. They are the Gazon, whom we will come to know, over the course of the series, as a lethal, deadly sect who subject themselves to these dire circumstances in return for the possible acquisition of power.

During the summer of 1994, Gazon was changed to Kazon, as it was feared that the name sounded too much like Gaza. The producers suggested this change to avoid stories involving the alien race being interpreted as political commentary on the conflicts in the Palestinian territories. According to the Star Trek: Voyager Technical Manual, the Kazon were originally planned to be split into only two factions (the "Kazon-Sera" and the "Kazon-Ogla").

=== Design and casting ===
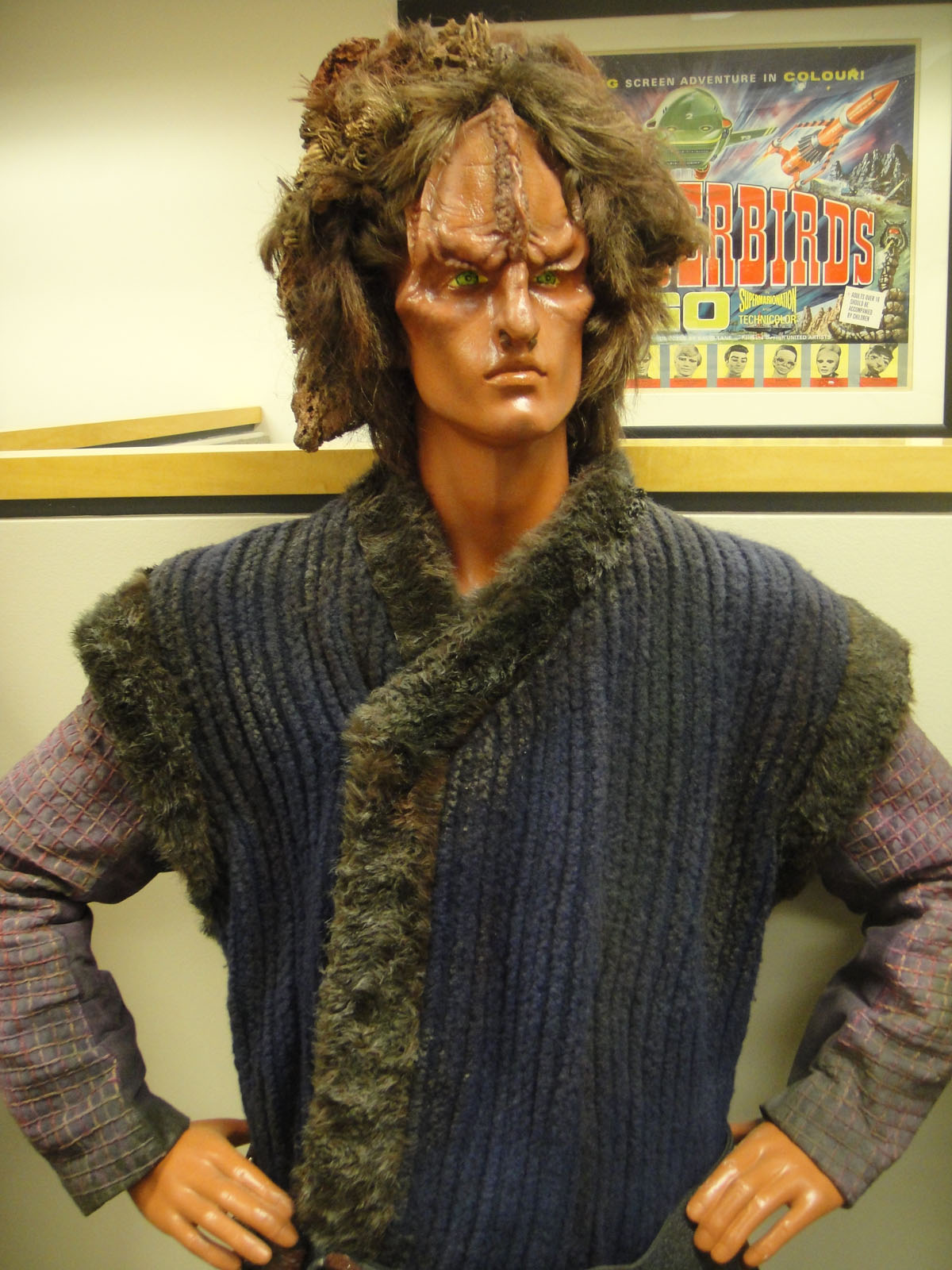
Michael Westmore was the principal make-up supervisor behind the Kazon's design (pictured).

The Kazon's design was formulated around the beginning of June 1994. The series' make-up supervisor Michael Westmore was heavily involved in the creation of the look for the Kazon. While describing the species' facial features, Westmore said he constructed a skin protrusion along the nose and front of the face to simulate "a soft cockscomb, a rooster comb" rather than "the dinosaur bone-type of ridges". He said that there were very small visual differences between Kazon males and females, with the distinguishing characteristic being women having a more delicate physicality than the men. According to Westmore, the prosthetic make-up for the forehead was structured in a shape reminiscent of the Devil, while the ridges on the nose were inspired by a vulture's neck. The nose designs were modified throughout the first two seasons with the addition of a nose tip and spikes protruding from the nostrils. The Kazon's design was the subject of fan criticism following the series premiere, with one fan commenting: "They look like they're all having a bad hair day." When Anthony De Longis first saw the headdress worn as a part of Culluh's costume, he joked that: "Culluh must be the leader because he has the biggest head of hair."

Westmore said that he faced several challenges involving the make-up and masks during the filming of "Caretaker". Because of the large number of Kazon present in the first episode, he hired additional make-up artists and mold makers to assist with getting all the actors into costume. According to supervising producer David Livingston, the process of applying the Kazon make-up took multiple hours. Since a majority of the scenes involving the Kazon were filmed at the El Mirage Lake, Livingston and the filming crew were assigned to help the actors feel comfortable in the heavy make-up and prosthetics despite the high temperatures.

Piller originally envisioned only casting actors between the ages of eighteen and twenty-five to simulate the connection between the Kazon and contemporary street gangs. He said that he wanted the casting choices to convey the alien species as "young, angry people who never lived old enough to have the kind of experience and perspective on the world that, say, the Klingons and Romulans might have". He wanted to emphasize that the Kazon were "much more emotional, short fused, and therefore had fewer expectations" through the actors' performances. The roles, however, were filled by actors outside this age range, with Piller explaining that the decision was reached on the grounds that the "older actors gave more polished performances". He later regretted the choice of more mature actors, as he felt this conflicted with the writers' concept of the species, making them appear too much like Klingons. The Kazon also received comparisons to the Cardassians and Wood Elves by Uproxx's Donna Dickens.

=== Filming and development ===
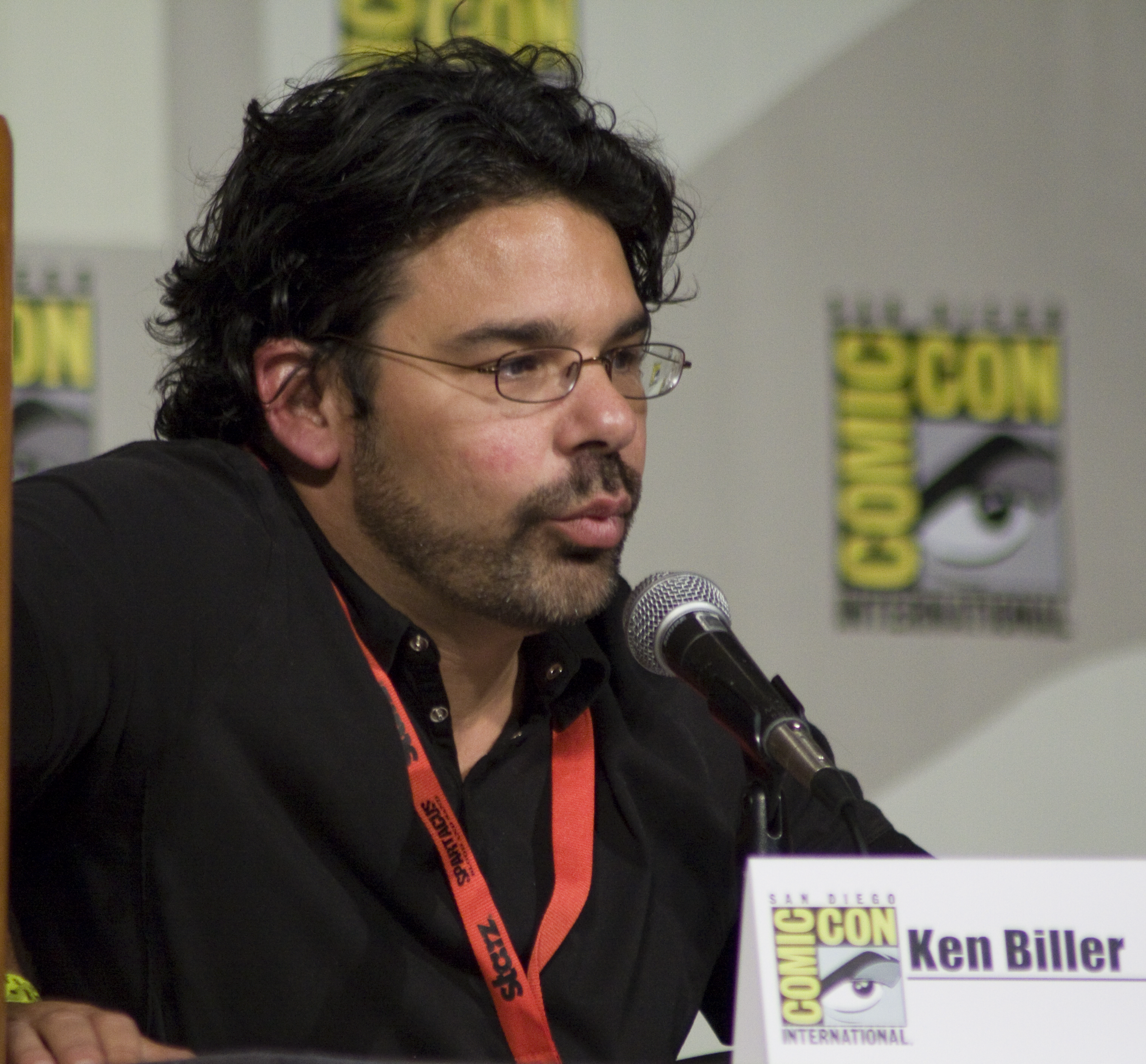
Kenneth Biller (pictured) wrote a majority of the background information relating to the Kazon during the development of the show's second season.

In the first season, the Kazon were introduced as one of three new alien species that could be used as recurring antagonists; the other two were the Vidiians and the Sikarians. The Kazon and Vidiians would be featured in later episodes, while the appearance of the Sikarians was restricted to the episode "Prime Factors". Westmore found the Kazon to be the most demanding species to design for Voyager's first season, though, overall, he found the make-up and prosthetic work for Voyager easier than that required for Star Trek: Deep Space Nine. He explained this by comparing the relatively small number of Kazon who appeared in episodes outside of the pilot to the numerous aliens featured throughout Deep Space Nine. The Kazon's design was modified during the filming of the first season. For example, for the second episode in which the Kazon appeared—"State of Flux"—Westmore removed the ear prosthetics, which had been created originally by hair designer Josée Normand to look like pigs' ears. The pig-ear prosthetics proved to be too cumbersome and heavy for the actors and stunt doubles, and its material was changed to a more light-weight sponge.

Voyager's writing team devoted a larger amount of screen time in the show's second season to develop Kazon culture and society. Piller described the season as "a deep investigation of [the Kazon] that will turn them, I think, into perhaps one of the top five adversarial alien races in Star Trek's history". Piller devised the Kazon's story arc in the second season from his experiences working on the 1995 science fiction Western television show Legend. Taylor was uncertain about the renewed focus on the Kazon, and questioned if they were compelling antagonists. She described them as entirely Piller's idea.

Executive story editor Kenneth Biller wrote a paper detailing the Kazon's history and societal behavior, as well as their adversarial relationship with the Trabe. Biller compiled all of his ideas on paper to help the various writers create a cohesive narrative for the Kazon across the individual episodes. Developed for one of his episodes—"Initiations"—the notes were also used by Taylor for the creation of "Alliances". Biller pointed to the character of Seska as a key narrative device for further exploring the alien species. For Biller, Seska "allowed us to go behind the scenes with the Kazon" and "helped to define the Kazon for us". Nonetheless, Hackett interpreted Seska as having little loyalty to the Kazon, saying: "I don't think she gives a hoot about [them]."

When discussing his hopes for fan reaction to the second season's emphasis on the Kazon, Piller said: "I'll be curious to know what the audience's perception is, if our investing in the Kazon this season worked." In response to fans' concerns that Voyager did not incorporate as many science fiction elements as previous Star Trek installments, he believed that the growing focus on the Kazon would serve as the solution. Piller believed the alien species accentuated the show's futuristic storylines, explaining: "There are a lot of people who don't consider a lot [of the season's episodes to be] science fiction." He followed this up by saying: "But certainly you can make a case that facing the Kazon in battle is futurist storytelling." Taylor viewed the second season as focused on "character-driven, introspective" stories, with a majority of the "action-adventure" aspects being conducted through the appearances of the Kazon.

=== Abandonment ===
Following the end of the second season, Taylor decided to remove the Kazon as the series' primary antagonists, having found the effort to develop the alien species to be unsuccessful. She felt that they never grew into a compelling adversary, despite their appearances in multiple episodes. Taylor argued that the Kazon limited the potential of the series, saying: "It created the curious implication that we are standing still in space, when our franchise is that we are going at incredible speeds toward the Alpha Quadrant – we keep running into the same people over and over again! It was just an oddity, and I don't think the Kazon have served us well." While discussing their role in the future episodes, she explained that it was her "intention to leave them behind and to find new and I hope more interesting aliens".

Even though Piller understood Taylor's disappointment with the Kazon, he felt that "it was important and valuable to create this adversary". Berman agreed with Taylor's assessment of the Kazon and noted that they would be removed in the beginning of the third season. He also admitted that the writers made several mistakes and introduced inconsistencies while developing the Kazon. Believing that the large amount of space under the Kazon's control was implausible, he argued that the number of times Voyager encountered the alien species would make their territory bigger than the United Federation of Planets and the Klingon Empire. Producer Brannon Braga supported the Kazon's removal, criticizing the species as "half-baked Klingons" and their constant inclusion in episodes as making the series have "the feeling that we're traveling in a big circle".

Despite the decision to eliminate the Kazon from future episodes, the writing team was uncertain if the season two finale and season three premiere would focus on them. Piller said that it was suggested that the episodes could serve as an introduction to a new alien species, but he supported the possibility that they act as a farewell to the Kazon storylines. He explained his decision by saying he "felt we had built up this arc with them and it was a natural conclusion". The Kazon were replaced by storylines focusing on the Vidiians, the Borg, and the Hirogen.

== Response ==
=== Cast response ===
Voyager's cast members had a negative response to the continued inclusion of the Kazon in the series and felt that their removal was the best course of action. Tim Russ commented that the frequent incorporation of the species would strain the credibility of the storylines as the crew would have to eventually leave Kazon-controlled space on their journey home. He also believed that the Kazon were failures as antagonists, perceiving them to be insufficiently imposing for the main characters and fans to take them seriously. Ethan Phillips agreed with Russ, suggesting that the Kazon's presence should be reduced. Robert Picardo joked that the only interesting aspect of the species was their hairstyle, while Robert Beltran pointed to their lack of intelligence as the main factor preventing them from becoming strong villains. Kate Mulgrew suggested that the show incorporate a new and stronger antagonist, saying: "We need [...] to encounter enemies of such ferocity, enemies who in fact are quite lethal and frightening. Enemies that you would watch and say, 'Oh, boy, how are they going to get out of this one?' I don't think the Kazon hit the bill." Mulgrew felt the crew's mission to get home was a more compelling storyline than those related to the Kazon, whom she criticized as "great big stupid giants".

=== Critical reception ===
The Kazon have received a negative response from television critics. In his 2005 book An Analytical Guide to Television's Battlestar Galactica, literary critic John Kenneth Muir argued that the events of Star Trek: Voyager lost their urgency with the basing of the second season in Kazon space. He negatively compared Star Trek: Voyager to science fiction television series Battlestar Galactica, writing that Star Trek: Voyager could learn from how "the Galactica must go on, ever forward, to their destination". The alien species was described as "stereotypical macho space warriors" by writer K. Stoddard Hayes, who was critical of the lack of developed Kazon characters. He explained this up by saying: "No memorable Kazon characters emerge from two seasons of episodes featuring their different factions."

Critics have also doubted the effectiveness of Kazon as villains. Britt found the Kazon to be among "the silliest, worst antagonists in Trek's history". Juliette Harrison of the website Den of Geek! wrote that the writers were too focused on the Kazon and Seska storylines. Harrison called them "sub-standard Klingon substitutes" and praised the series' decision to replace them with the Borg. The Kazon, along with Seska, were placed at number two on a list by Io9's Charlie Jane Anders profiling the 10 least threatening Star Trek villains. Anders explained that the Kazon were more frequently represented as irritating pests than a major obstacle to Voyager's journey home. Charles Evans of FanSided questioned the Kazon's desperation for water, since they could use their warp technology to gather it from other planets. Even though Evans described the Kazon as starting from a good premise, he did not find them to live up to their label as "the most powerful race in their area of the Delta Quadrant".

TrekToday's Michelle Erica Green provided extensive and primarily negative commentary on the Kazon story arc in the first two seasons while re-watching the series. The Kazon were negatively compared to the Klingons by Green, who described the Vidiians as a more suitable and compelling candidate to serve as the primary antagonists for the first two seasons. Green questioned Janeway's resolve to never share Voyager's technology with the Kazon, writing that the species was characterized as "a spacefaring culture with warp drive" so the crew would not be "interfering with a primitive civilization". She argued that the Kazon's attempts to steal a replicator and a transporter rather than offensive weapons lessened their impact as a threatening presence, suggesting that the possibility of relations with the Kazon did not "seem much more heinous than dealing with the Klingons or Ferengi, who oppress women and minorities within their borders".

Despite negative critical reception of the Kazon, the scene in which they commandeer Voyager was praised by television commentators. Marc Buxton, of Den of Geek!, included the Kazon on his list of the 50 best alien life forms in the Star Trek universe, for their "advanced technology and a back-stabbing bloodthirst" and success in trapping the Voyager crew on a hostile planet. Similarly, Tor.com's Ryan Britt ranked the moment when the Kazon captured the ship as one of the seven most shocking instances in the Star Trek franchise.

=== Racial and political analysis ===
The representation of the Kazon as antagonists has been criticized by genre commentators and academics as an example of racism in the Star Trek franchise. Christina Niculescu and Yonit Nemtzeanu were critical of the dark-skinned Kazon being treated as more aggressive than the more diplomatic, fair-skinned alien species. They determined that the representation of the Kazon was implicitly racist, writing that the species was shown as embodying negative stereotypes. Niculescu and Nemtzeanu followed this up by saying that the Kazon were written only to be "criminals and savages" and seen as "primitive". In his 2016 The Politics of Star Trek, the political scientist George A. Gonzalez agreed the skin tone and hair style designed for the Kazon as carrying explicit racial connotations, and felt that it was made more apparent during their conflict with the lighter-skinned Ocampa. Zach of Bitch Media placed the Kazon as one example of Star Trek's uneven treatment of race. He compared the Kazon to the Klingons and Ferengi, writing that "aliens-of-color [are] used as proxies to represent the worst aspects of human behavior".

The Kazon have been interpreted as a sociopolitical commentary on developing countries. George A. Gonzalez presented the Kazon as a pessimistic feature of the Delta Quadrant, which he read as a metaphor for the developing world. Emphasizing the Kazon's mistreatment of the Ocampa, plans to steal from Voyager's more developed technology, and inability to form lasting alliances, Gonzalez describes the series as interpreting race relations in developing countries as "inherently contentious and inevitably destabilizing". He concluded by saying that the Kazon storylines were in line with "neoconservative biases/reasoning". For a 2015 retrospective review of the Star Trek franchise, MoviePilot's David Trudel wrote that he was disappointed in the breakdown of the alliance between the Kazon and the Trabe in the episode "Alliances". He felt that the series should have featured the formation of a new Federation starting with these two alien species. Some critics viewed the episode as "the moment Trek died intellectually", though Trudel disagreed with this assessment as "fairly dramatic". In 1996, The New York Times' Jon Pareles offered a less critical assessment of Star Trek's development of alien species, describing them as enacting "exaggerated human tendencies". Pareles identified the Kazon's rebellion against their previous captors in particular as comparable to the political situations in Somalia or Rwanda at the time of his writing.
