= Prototype (Star Trek: Voyager) =

- Star Trek: Voyager episode
- Episode no.: Season 2 Episode 13
- Directed by: Jonathan Frakes
- Written by: Nicholas Corea
- Production code: 129
- Original air date: January 15, 1996

Guest appearances
- Rick Worthy - 3947 / Cravic 122; Hugh Hodgin - 6263 / Prototype 0001

Episode chronology
← Previous "Resistance"	Next → "Alliances"
- Star Trek: Voyager season 2

"Prototype" is the 29th episode of science fiction television series Star Trek: Voyager, and the 13th episode in the second season. It was written by Nicholas Corea and directed by Jonathan Frakes. This episode was broadcast on UPN on January 15, 1996. In this episode, the crew of spaceship making their way back to Earth have an encounter with a race of warring robotic life forms.

== Plot ==
Chief Engineer B'Elanna Torres recovers a robot floating in space. She convinces Captain Janeway to ignore Commander Tuvok's warnings and allow her to revive the robot. It introduces itself as "Automated Unit 3947" of the "Pralor" robot faction. He reveals their creators were destroyed during a war decades ago and many Pralors are falling apart; with no one to create additional units, the Pralors will soon become extinct. 3947 asks Torres to build a prototype, which would allow the Pralors to procreate.

Captain Janeway forbids this, citing the Prime Directive. The Automated Units were not designed to reproduce; giving them the capability to do so would interfere with its culture. When a Pralor ship approaches Voyager to retrieve 3947, 3947 abducts Torres. The Pralor ship is prepared to destroy Voyager until Torres agrees to create the prototype. Torres succeeds.

The Voyager crew require a diversion to rescue Torres. Suddenly a second ship piloted by Automated Units appears and attacks the Pralors. The second ship identifies itself as the "Cravic" faction. 3947 reveals that two planets, Pralor and Cravic, created Automated Units to wage war against each other several decades ago. When the two planets called a truce and attempted to terminate the robots, the robots destroyed their creators out of self-preservation and continued their war. Torres realizes her prototype will upset the balance of the war and destroys it. Using the battle, as their diversion, the Voyager crew transport Torres off the Pralor ship, and leave the battlefield.

== Reception ==
This had Nielsen ratings of 5.9 points when it was broadcast on television in 1996.

Cinefantastique rated this episode 2.5 out of four. Tor.com rated it 7 out of 10.

In 2020, io9 listed this episode as one of the nine "must watch" episodes from season two of the show.
