= Alliances (Star Trek: Voyager) =

- Star Trek: Voyager episode
- Episode no.: Season 2 Episode 14
- Directed by: Les Landau
- Written by: Jeri Taylor
- Production code: 131
- Original air date: January 22, 1996

Guest appearances
- Martha Hackett - Seska; Anthony De Longis - Maje Culluh; Charles O. Lucia - Mabus; Raphael Sbarge - Michael Jonas; John Gegenhuber - Jal Surat; Simon Billig - Hogan; Larry Cedar - Tersa; Mirron E. Willis - Rettik

Episode chronology
← Previous "Prototype"	Next → "Threshold"
- Star Trek: Voyager season 2

"Alliances" is the 30th episode of American science fiction television series Star Trek: Voyager, and is the 14th episode in the second season.

The series follows the adventures of the Federation starship Voyager during its journey home to Earth, having been stranded tens of thousands of light-years away. In this episode, Captain Janeway tries to form alliances to help them on their way back.

The episode aired on UPN on January 22, 1996.

== Plot ==
A Kazon attack takes the life of another Voyager crewman, this time the popular ex-Maquis soldier Kurt Bendera. Chakotay, a good friend of Bendera, delivers the eulogy and tells of a time Bendera rescued him from angry miners. After the funeral, Michael Jonas and Crewman Hogan tell Captain Janeway that Voyager should change the way she operates to be more like a Maquis.

Chakotay voices the proposal of forming an alliance with one or two Kazon factions to secure peace, not to trade technology, but to offer protection from attacking forces and emergency supplies. In a following talk with Tuvok, he gives the example of peace formed by the unlikely alliance between the Federation and Klingons and how it helped stabilize the quadrant. Janeway opens up to the idea of an alliance and the officers decide to talk with Seska and her maje (leader), Culluh, about allying with her tribe. Meanwhile, Neelix decides to use some of his contacts to propose an alliance with a different tribe.

While negotiations with Culluh seem to start well, they hit a sticking point when he demands to exchange crewmembers, which Janeway refuses. Seska discreetly tries to talk Culluh down, but he reacts by saying that women have no right to make demands of him, causing Janeway to immediately terminate the negotiations and have Culluh thrown off the ship, much to Seska's annoyance. Meanwhile, Neelix is abducted before he is able to contact the maje. He is imprisoned with a number of aliens, including many women and children. These are the Trabe, who had been imprisoned because of a generations-long conflict between them and the Kazon. Neelix befriends the Trabe elder, Mabus, who gives his assurance of help in any escape attempts. Other Trabe forces attack the Kazon stronghold and Neelix, keeping an eye out for the children, assists. They escape on pilfered Kazon merchant-vessels, which had, it was revealed, originally been constructed by the Trabe, along with all the other technology used by the Kazon.

Having invited Mabus aboard Voyager, Janeway learns about the past between the Trabe and the Kazon: the Trabe used to persecute the Kazon, deemed an inferior and violent race, enslaving them, fencing them off and turning them against each other. However, some 30 years prior, the Kazon successfully rose against the Trabe, seized both their planet and technology, and turned the Trabe into space nomads because every time they resettle on a new planet, the vengeful Kazon attack and chase them away. Mabus argues that while the Trabe's treatment of the Kazon was condemnable, their descendants are now innocent.

Janeway decides to pursue paths of an alliance with the Trabe, in spite of the danger of the possibility of it rallying the Kazon together against them. They try to pre-empt their wrath by attempting to form peaceful negotiations. Seska finds it a great opportunity to learn the weaknesses of the other tribes and potentially use it to gain an edge against all other Kazon, as well as Voyager and the Trabe. The Voyager crew learns that someone is planning to disrupt the conference, but they cannot determine who. They decide that any Kazon who attempts to leave the conference would be the guilty party.

The Kazon also hear something is amiss, but all the maje attend, too frightened to be left out of an alliance. The Kazon are suspicious especially of the Trabe, but Culluh is vocal about his distaste for befriending either the hated Trabe or a woman-led Federation. As the delegates argue, Mabus attempts to leave the conference, causing Janeway to realize that he intended all along to sabotage the negotiations. She manages to call out a warning to the Kazon before she, her party and Mabus are beamed out as a ship fires into the conference-room. Voyager attacks the ship, driving it away. The Kazon manage to survive.

On Voyager, Mabus reveals his plan was to kill all the maje with one blow, thus crippling the Kazon forces for years. He never believed that the Kazon could be reasoned with. Outraged by the Trabe's duplicitous and murderous move, Janeway breaks the alliance with them, and flees before the Kazon are able to retaliate. More vulnerable than ever and in space filled with lawless races, she emphasizes the need to hold on to what rules they have.

== Reception ==
In 2020, The Digital Fix said that this was the worst episode in season two of Star Trek: Voyager, and felt that it was "a mess from beginning to end". They were not happy with the character of Janeway or the presentation of the Kazon.
