= Non Sequitur (Star Trek: Voyager) =

- Star Trek: Voyager episode
- Episode no.: Season 2 Episode 5
- Directed by: David Livingston
- Written by: Brannon Braga
- Production code: 122
- Original air date: September 25, 1995

Guest appearances
- Louis Giambalvo - Cosimo; Jennifer Gatti - Libby; Jack Shearer - Admiral Strickler; Mark Kiely - Lieutenant Lasca

Episode chronology
← Previous "Elogium"	Next → "Twisted"
- Star Trek: Voyager season 2

"Non Sequitur" is the 21st episode of Star Trek: Voyager, the fifth episode in the second season. Harry Kim is enigmatically stranded back on Earth, only to discover the lives of his companions have been radically altered. Much of the episode takes place on Earth in the same era as Voyager, but in an alternate timeline caused by an anomaly.

The episode aired on UPN on September 25, 1995.

== Plot ==
Harry Kim is aboard a shuttlecraft as it is shaking violently. As he contacts Voyager, Captain Janeway attempts to beam him out, and he awakens on Earth in San Francisco next to his girlfriend, Libby, whom he had dearly missed. The date is the same as he remembered, but his life is completely different: Harry retains his memories of his time on Voyager, yet there is no evidence he was ever aboard. Kim finds he was denied a posting on Voyager and then took an assignment working at the shuttlecraft development center at Starfleet Headquarters.

After he leaves a briefing with staff admirals because of "sickness", he looks for any explanation for his current situation. Harry uses his knowledge of Voyager's security codes to obtain classified information on his ship. Kim realizes he has somehow swapped places with his friend Daniel Byrd. While skimming through the crew manifest, Kim notices Tom Paris is not listed as part of Voyager's crew either. He learns Paris now lives in Marseille, France, after his parole, and goes there to try to enlist his help in figuring out what happened. Paris tells Kim that he lost his "advisor's" spot on Voyager after Odo threw him in the brig for getting into a fight with Quark prior to Voyager's departure — a fight Kim prevented in the original timeline. Harry tries to convince Tom about going to Starfleet Headquarters to do a shuttle simulation but Paris rejects it as merely an attempt to recruit him as a pawn.

Upon his return to San Francisco, Kim is apprehended by security and taken to Starfleet Headquarters for questioning because of his unauthorized access to restricted files and his recent association with Paris. Kim is suspected of being a Maquis spy and is fitted with a security anklet to track his movements. He discovers that a shuttlecraft accident caused him to fall into a time-stream and enter a timeline where he was never a part of Voyager's crew. A time-stream alien tells Kim that if he recreates the conditions of the accident precisely, he might get back to his own reality, but there is considerable risk. The alien wonders whether Harry was meant to be here in this timeline as "fate", but Harry rejects that, noting Daniel and Tom and stating that he is supposed to be on Voyager.

Harry tries to tamper with his security anklet, but sets off the tampering alarm, which alerts Starfleet. Paris comes to Kim's aid and rescues him. They steal a runabout and try to recreate the accident. A starship gets on their tail and fires upon them, but Kim comes up with an idea to slow the ship for a couple of seconds that gives the runabout time. Kim remembers that before things went wrong, he was preparing for emergency transport and thus must beam off the shuttlecraft, which he does moments before it is destroyed. Immediately, Kim is returned to the moment prior to having to prepare for emergency transport, where the crew narrowly transports Kim back to the ship before the hull is breached. A happy Kim expresses gratitude to a bemused Paris.

== Production ==
The episode was partly shot on the same set used as New Orleans in Star Trek: Deep Space Nine and reuses old footage from Star Trek IV: The Voyage Home and the Star Trek: The Next Generation episode "Relics".

== See also ==
- "Timeless" (another Voyager time anomalies episode)
- "Yesterday's Enterprise" (a Next Generation time anomalies episode)
- Non sequitur, for the literary device and invalid argument
