= Threshold (Star Trek: Voyager) =

- Star Trek: Voyager episode
- Episode no.: Season 2 Episode 15
- Directed by: Alexander Singer
- Story by: Michael De Luca
- Teleplay by: Brannon Braga
- Cinematography by: Marvin V. Rush
- Production code: 132
- Original air date: January 29, 1996

Guest appearances
- Raphael Sbarge - Michael Jonas; Mirron E. Willis - Rettik

Episode chronology
← Previous "Alliances"	Next → "Meld"
- Star Trek: Voyager season 2

"Threshold" is the 31st episode of American science fiction television series Star Trek: Voyager and the 15th episode in its second season. It first aired on UPN on January 29, 1996.

The series follows the adventures of the Federation starship Voyager during its journey home to Earth, having been stranded tens of thousands of light-years away. In this episode, Lieutenant Tom Paris (Robert Duncan McNeill) becomes the first known person to travel faster than Warp 10; however, the achievement causes him to mutate into a salamander-like creature.

The episode is widely regarded by fans and critics as one of the worst episodes of Voyager and of the entire Star Trek franchise.

== Plot ==
Voyager's crew discovers a rare, more stable form of dilithium that they conjecture could power a warp drive beyond Warp 10. This would allow Voyager to reach the Alpha Quadrant near instantaneously. Although simulations prove disastrous, Lieutenant Paris (Robert Duncan McNeill) comes up with an idea after an off-the-cuff discussion with Neelix (Ethan Phillips). The next simulation is successful and a shuttlecraft, dubbed the Cochrane, is prepared for a full test flight. The Doctor (Robert Picardo) identifies a rare medical condition in Lieutenant Paris indicating a 2% chance that he will suffer lethal effects from the test-flight and recommends assigning Ensign Kim (Garrett Wang) as test-pilot. Paris convinces Captain Janeway (Kate Mulgrew) to allow him to fly the shuttle despite the small risk.

Paris successfully breaks the Warp 10 barrier in the Cochrane, rapidly disappearing from Voyager's sensors. The crew begins to try to track the shuttle, but soon the Cochrane reappears, Paris unconscious at the controls. Once awake, Paris explains that he has seen everything at every point in space, and the shuttle's database similarly contains a massive amount of information about the Delta Quadrant. However, Paris starts to suffer allergic reactions, and he is raced to Sickbay, where the Doctor determines that Paris is now allergic to common water. Paris's body soon changes again, and no longer can process oxygen, forcing the Doctor to create a special environment that Paris can exist in.

As Paris's body continues its strange transformations, the Doctor hypothesizes that he is becoming a new form of life. Before the Doctor can use an "anti-proton" treatment to return Paris to his human form, Paris escapes, disrupts Voyager's internal systems, and kidnaps Janeway on the Cochrane. As Voyager follows the shuttle's trail, they come to a planet covered in swampland. The Doctor explains that mutations in Paris' DNA are consistent with those of organisms undergoing evolution. Near the shuttle, they discover two amphibian beings, with trace DNA of Paris and Janeway; it becomes clear that Paris had kidnapped Janeway to mate with her, producing three infant creatures. Tuvok (Tim Russ) and Chakotay (Robert Beltran) recover the transformed Janeway and Paris, leaving the offspring on the planet, and the Doctor is able to return them to human form.

== Notes ==
- The mutated Tom Paris was made into an action figure, with his three offspring as accessories.
- The writing staff was dissatisfied with the quality of the episode, to the point that Brannon Braga later called it a "royal, steaming stinker" on the commentary for the DVD release.
- Jeri Taylor commented that the fans were appalled at the episode, mainly centred on the implausible idea that the two stars were turned into salamanders. "It is not one that took with the audience. The fact that we were turning people into salamanders was offensive to a lot of people and just stupid to others."

== Science analysis ==
Live Long and Evolve: What Star Trek Can Teach Us About Genetics, Evolution, and Life on Other Worlds by Mohamed A. F. Noor discusses how such extreme mutation is more likely to result in cancers or death than transmutation, the genetic mutations were too repeatable, and the speed of change was remarkably fast. The book suggests some of these problems may be allayed very slightly if the changes were epigenetic rather than genetic, but the premise is an extreme stretch in the biology either way.

Speaking to technology journalist Becca Caddy for her "Science of Star Trek" column, Dr. Charles Foster, Bioinformatics Research Associate in the Virology Research Lab at the University of New South Wales and Prince of Wales Hospital, observed: "If strong external pressures are applied to a population—or experienced by a population—one would expect there to be 'sped up' evolution." Caddy concluded: "Who's to say space newts don't have some inconceivable, advanced consciousness beyond our wildest dreams? And who knows how we'd evolve if we were simultaneously at all points in space—talk about external pressure."

In 2018, Dr Mohamed A. F. Noor, a biologist and fan of Star Trek, wrote up a research paper based on this episode. He submitted it to ten open-access journals known or suspected of charging fees without providing services, such as peer review and vetting of the paper's claims. Four accepted the paper and one, the American Research Journal of Biosciences, published it.

== Reception ==
In 2015, "Threshold" was included in Geek.com's 35 greatest moments in Star Trek—they ranked Tom Paris hitting Warp 10 as the 30th greatest moment of all Star Trek.

In 2018, The Doctor included this episode in a list of Star Trek episodes that are "so bad they must be seen". In 2012, Den of Geek listed this as the worst episode of Star Trek: Voyager.

Den of Geek included this episode on a binge watching guide that included a roadmap of episodes that although not typically achieving high ratings, were still entertaining.

In 2017, Screen Rant ranked this episode the fifth worst episode of the Star Trek franchise. In July 2019, they again ranked "Threshold" as one of the top five worst of the series, although they felt there was a good start to the episode. The following year, they ranked it the second worst episode of the series, noting an IMDb rating of 5.3 out ten; they elaborate: "It barely gets off the ground from there before it crashes and burns into some kind of drunken daydream..."

Brannon Braga called it "a real stinker".
