= John Gegenhuber =

American actor

John Thomas Gegenhuber is an American actor. Since 2013, he has been the voice of Cap'n Crunch. Raised in Palatine, Illinois, his earliest screen-acting credit was in the 1986 PBS telefilm Under the Biltmore Clock. He has starred in several series, as well as appeared as a guest or recurring character on numerous shows, including Seinfeld (1993), Murphy Brown (1994), Star Trek: Voyager (1995-1996), Mad About You (1997), Law & Order (1997) and Seven Days (1999). He was part of the cast of the NBC series Earth 2 (1994-1995). He also appeared in the movies Straight Talk (1992) and Rookie of the Year (1993), and video games like Lego Dimensions (2015).

In 2006, Gegenhuber co-wrote, co-directed and co-starred in The Perverts which was shown at the 2006 ITVFest (Independent Television Festival).

A longtime teacher of the improvisation techniques of Viola Spolin, he conducts classes as an acting instructor. He became Education Coordinator for The Open Fist Theatre Company in Los Angeles, California in 2007.

Gegenhuber received his BFA in Acting from the Goodman School of Drama in Chicago (now The Theatre School at DePaul University).

== Film and television appearances ==
- Under the Biltmore Clock (1986) as Chauffeur
- Straight Talk (1992) as Waiter
- Rookie of the Year (1993) as Derkin
- Seinfeld (1993) Resident Doctor in "The Bris"
- Grace Under Fire (1993) as Blind Mouse in "The Good, the Bad, and the Pharmacist"
- Murphy Brown (1994) as Sean Van Ohlen in "The Deal of the Art"
- Earth 2 (1994–1995) as Morgan Martin
- Star Trek: Voyager (1995–1996) as Tierna in "Basics, Part 1" and Kelat in "Alliances" and "Maneuvers"
- Law & Order (1997) as Pilot in "Judgement in LA: Turnaround"
- Mad About You (1997) as Dr. Ben in "The Birth"
- The Pretender (1997) as Dr. Lawford in "Nip and Tuck"
- L.A. Doctors (1999) as Dr. Doug Carter in "Where the Rubber Meets the Road" and "True Believers"
- Seven Days (1999) (credited as John Wollner) as Lloyd Sype in "Pinball Wizard"
- The Making of Daniel Boone (2003) as Benjamin Logan
- A Question of Loyalty (2005) as SS Man (uncredited)
- The Perverts (2006) as Bob
- SpongeBob SquarePants (2018–present) as Old Man Jenkins, Walter Haddock, Barry, Impound Yard Worker, additional voices
- Kamp Koral: SpongeBob's Under Years (2021–2024) as Jimmy Blobfish
- The Patrick Star Show (2021–present) as Old Man Jenkins

== Theatre appearances ==
- Open Fist Theatre: The Room (Kermit Roosevelt)
- Actor's Gang: Ugly's First World (Aleister Crowley)
- Goodman Theater: Puddin 'N Pete (Sal, Janskey), The Visit (Painter)
- Steppenwolf Theater: Harvey (Wilson)
- Coast Playhouse: Help! (Garwood)
- Arena Stage: Crime and Punishment (Lebeziantnikov), The Wild Duck (Molvig), Women and Water (Amos Mason), The Good Person of Setzuan (Wang), The Taming of the Shrew (Biondello)
- Northlight Theater: The White Plague (Dr. Galen), Teibele and Her Demon, Heart of a Dog: The Adding Machine (u/s Frank Galati, Hystopolis Puppet Thtr, Mr. Zero)
- Stormfield Theater: The Sons of Corl Gap (Henry)
- Library Theater: Caligula (Scipio)
- Library Theater: Edward II (Gaveston)

== Video game appearances ==
- Lego Dimensions (2015) as voice of Cragger from Lego Legends of Chima
- Dishonored 2 (2016) as voice of Kirin Jindosh
- SpongeBob SquarePants: The Cosmic Shake (2023) as voices of Old Man Jenkins, Arcade Machine, Citizens
- SpongeBob SquarePants: Titans of the Tide (2025) as voices of Old Man Jenkins, Guard, Citizens
