= Rookie of the Year (film) =

1993 film by Daniel Stern

- Theatrical release poster
- Directed by: Daniel Stern
- Written by: Sam Harper
- Produced by: Robert Harper
- Starring: Thomas Ian Nicholas; Gary Busey; Dan Hedaya; Daniel Stern
- Cinematography: Jack Green
- Edited by: Donn Cambern; Raja Gosnell
- Music by: Bill Conti
- Distributed by: 20th Century Fox
- Release date: July 7, 1993
- Running time: 103 minutes
- Country: United States
- Language: English
- Budget: $10-14 million
- Box office: $56.5 million

Rookie of the Year is a 1993 American sports comedy film starring Thomas Ian Nicholas and Gary Busey as players for the Chicago Cubs of Major League Baseball. The cast also includes Albert Hall, Dan Hedaya, Eddie Bracken, Amy Morton, Bruce Altman, John Gegenhuber, Neil Flynn, Daniel Stern (who also directed in his feature film directorial debut), and John Candy in an uncredited role.

Rookie of the Year was released in the United States on July 7, 1993, by 20th Century Fox. The film received mixed reviews from critics and grossed $56.5 million.

== Plot ==
Henry Rowengartner, an unskilled Little Leaguer who dreams of playing in the Major Leagues, lives with his mother, Mary, who is dating sports agent Jack Bradfield. One day, Henry breaks his arm catching a fly ball. When the doctor removes the cast, he discovers that Henry's tendons have healed "a little too tight", enabling Henry to throw a ball with incredible force.

At Wrigley Field during a Chicago Cubs game, Henry's friends, George and Clark, get a home run ball hit by the visiting Montreal Expos. Observing the Wrigley Field tradition of throwing the ball back to the field following an opposing home run, Henry throws it so hard that it reaches home plate, 435 feet (133 m) away, on the fly. Desperate to save the club from declining attendance, general manager Larry Fisher looks to recruit Henry. Manager Sal Martinella visits Henry at home with a radar gun and discovers that Henry can pitch at over 100 miles per hour (160 km/h), which is well beyond the normal range of a Little League player. For the remainder of the season, Henry juggles the culture shock of playing in the major leagues alongside one of his heroes, aging pitcher Chet "The Rocket" Steadman, being coached by the inept Phil Brickma, and socializing.

Henry's first game is a relief appearance against the New York Mets, where his first pitch gives up a home run to the Mets' arrogant slugger Heddo, and then he hits a batter, throws a wild pitch, yet still manages to get his first save. Henry improves his control under Steadman's mentoring and records a second consecutive save against the San Francisco Giants, and his first MLB strikeout.

Continuing to impress, Henry bats for the first time in a road game against the Los Angeles Dodgers. He frustrates the pitcher with his small stature and tiny strike zone to the point that he walks Henry on four straight high pitches. He further taunts the pitcher at first and second base, and the pitcher retaliates by hitting the next batter, but Henry and that next batter manage to both score runs despite nearly passing each other on the base paths.

The Cubs are winning, and Henry is growing in pitching success and fame; at the same time, Mary and Steadman develop feelings for one another. In retaliation, Jack asks Fisher to release Steadman. Meanwhile, Henry's personal life becomes strained as his friend George grows resentful when Henry takes hours to finish filming a Pepsi commercial instead of helping him and Clark to fix up an old boat. Mary breaks up with Jack and throws him out of the house after learning he tricked her into signing a contract that would send Henry to the New York Yankees (and earning Jack a hefty $2.5 million). Henry resolves the conflict with his friends by blowing off another commercial to complete the boat with them. They take a boat ride and Henry invites his girlfriend Becky, alongside George's girlfriend Tiffany, and Clark's girlfriend Edith. Henry enjoyed his time with his friends and the triple date on the boat ride that he decides to retire from the Cubs since he can have more time for his life. Kindly, team owner Bob Carson explains he never authorized a deal with the Yankees and wants to retain Henry. Henry instead decides that he wants to retire early to focus on a life outside baseball; Carson respects this and demotes Fisher to a hot dog vendor after learning that he tried to set up the deal that almost cost the Cubs the division.

On the last day of the season, the Cubs face the Mets again at Wrigley Field, with Steadman starting. If the Cubs triumph, they win the division and move on to the World Series. Steadman pitches his best game in years, but he blows out his arm on the last pitch. The ball is hit to Steadman, who cannot throw it to home plate due to his injured arm. He runs home and dives to tag the runner out at home, keeping the Cubs in the lead. He turns the ball over to Henry, who easily strikes out the side in the seventh and eighth innings. However, he slips after stepping on the ball in the top of the ninth and lands on his pitching shoulder, which loosens his arm up and robs him of his fastball.

Henry frustrates the Cubs and their fans by intentionally walking the first batter. He explains to his teammates why he can no longer throw fastballs and sends them back to their positions with a plan. With their cooperation, Henry sneaks the ball to the first baseman, who tags the runner out. Henry walks the next batter, with whom he trades insults. When the runner dares him to throw the ball high, Henry does so, but stops as the runner takes off for second and is tagged out, setting up a final showdown with Heddo. Henry throws a changeup, which Heddo misses, and his next hit appears headed for the bleachers but is ruled a foul ball. Henry notices some tape inside his glove and peels it off to find not his father's name, but Mary's. In the stands, she signals him to throw a "Floater". He does so and strikes out a shocked Heddo (who then throws a tantrum at home plate), winning the division title for the Cubs and heading to the World Series. The Cubs and their fans celebrate, and Henry throws the game-winning ball to his mother.

The next spring, Henry plays Little League again. Mary and Steadman, now a couple, are his team's coaches. After catching a potential home run ball that ensures his team's victory, Henry raises his fist to reveal a Cubs championship ring, signifying his role in the Cubs' World Series victory.

== Cast ==
- Thomas Ian Nicholas as Henry Rowengartner
- Gary Busey as Chet "Rocket" Steadman
- Albert Hall as Sal Martinella
- Amy Morton as Mary Rowengartner
- Dan Hedaya as Larry "Fish" Fisher
- Daniel Stern as Phil Brickma
- Bruce Altman as Jack Bradfield
- Eddie Bracken as Bob Carson
- Robert Hy Gorman as Clark
- Patrick LaBrecque as George
- Tom Milanovich as Heddo
- Neil Flynn as Stan Okie
- W. Earl Brown as Billy Frick
- Ian Gomez as Odd Bellman
- Andy Berman as Ernie
- Colombe Jacobsen as Becky Fraker
- John Candy as Cliff Murdoch (uncredited)
- Barry Bonds as himself
- Bobby Bonilla as himself
- Pedro Guerrero as himself

== Production ==
Filming took place on location at, among other venues, Wrigley Field (including in between games of a doubleheader on September 19, 1992, between the Cubs and the rival St. Louis Cardinals) and O'Hare Airport. However, the road game against the Dodgers was filmed at Comiskey Park in Chicago.

== Reception ==
The film has received a 41% approval rating on Rotten Tomatoes based on reviews from 22 critics, with an average rating of 5/10. The consensus reads, "Rookie of the Year gets some laughs from its novel premise, but a high strikeout rate on jokes and sentimental fouls keeps this comedy firmly in the minor leagues."

Roger Ebert awarded the film three out of four stars, writing in his review:

I was absolutely lousy in Little League. I was a sub for one season, screwing up every play I was involved in. I stopped out there in the middle of right field, squinting into the sun, hoping desperately that the ball would not come my way. If it did, I didn't use my glove to catch it. I used the glove for protection. I was, in fact, a lot like Henry Rowengartner, the 12-year-old hero of "Rookie of the Year." It seemed like the other kids had always known how to play baseball, and that I would never know. When I was a kid, I think I might have liked "Rookie of the Year" a lot. I am no longer a kid, and this movie is not likely to make my list of the year's best, but I can remember those miserable Little League games and so in a modest way I'm grateful for this film. It is pure wish-fulfillment, 40 years after I needed it.

Stephen Holden of The New York Times dismissed the film as "a lighter-than-air movie fantasy of major-league stardom" with a "paint-by-the-numbers plot", while Michael Wilmington of the Los Angeles Times opined,

There's a movie-making knack we might call "The Gift for the Plausible Absurd." Simply put, it's the quality that enables some filmmakers to make us believe in giant lovelorn apes, adorable stranded extraterrestrials, the Yellow Brick Road to the Emerald City, and talking mules, dogs, cats, and caterpillars. Canny pros can take this baloney and make us both swallow and love it.

That's the quality "Rookie of the Year" really needs. And doesn't have.

A children's baseball fantasy/comedy about a 12-year-old pitching phenom who puts the Chicago Cubs in the pennant race, this movie starts promisingly, generates some laughs and goodwill, and introduces likable actors.

[…]

Children, I suspect, are its likeliest potential fans. And children need rationales less than the rest of us. They'll accept a flying elephant even without the ears and the magic feather.

The film crossed $9.2 million on 1,460 screens on its opening weekend. It dropped to seventh place the following week, and by its third weekend was in eighth place behind Poetic Justice and six other films. It grossed $53.6 million in the United States and Canada but performed poorly internationally, grossing only $2.9 million for a worldwide total of $56.5 million on a budget between $10–14 million.

Following the film's release, Nicholas threw out the first pitch at Cubs games and was invited to sing "Take Me Out to the Ball Game" multiple times during the customary 7th-inning stretch. During the 2015 National League Championship Series, where the Cubs faced the Mets as they did in the movie, he attended Game 4 in a Rowengartner #1 jersey similar to what he wore during the film.

Following the Cubs' win over the Cleveland Indians in Game 7 of the 2016 World Series to win their first championship since 1908, Nicholas, in celebration, tweeted the final shot from the movie of Henry showing his Cubs World Series ring. Furthermore, director Daniel Stern briefly reprised his role of Brickma in another tweet following the win.

== Cancelled remake ==
In October 2018, 20th Century Fox announced that a remake to the film was in works with Dan Gregor and Doug Mand set to write a script, with Gregor eyeing to direct. Nothing has since come out in regards to the status of the project.

== See also ==
- List of baseball films
