= Elogium (Star Trek: Voyager) =

- Star Trek: Voyager episode
- Episode no.: Season 2 Episode 4
- Directed by: Winrich Kolbe
- Story by: Jimmy Diggs; Steve J. Kay
- Teleplay by: Kenneth Biller; Jeri Taylor
- Production code: 118
- Original air date: September 18, 1995
- Running time: 45:49

Guest appearances
- Nancy Hower as Samantha Wildman; Gary O'Brien as Crewmember; Terry Correll as N.D. Crewmember

Episode chronology
← Previous "Projections"	Next → "Non Sequitur"
- Star Trek: Voyager season 2

"Elogium" is the fourth episode of the second season of the American science fiction television series Star Trek: Voyager, the 20th episode overall. The episode first aired on UPN on September 18, 1995. The story was written by freelancers Jimmy Diggs and Steve J. Kay, based on Diggs' experience while serving in the United States Navy. It was rewritten by executive producer Jeri Taylor and guest writer Kenneth Biller.

Set in the 24th century, the series follows the adventures of the Starfleet and Maquis crew of the starship USS Voyager after they were stranded in the Delta Quadrant far from the rest of the Federation. In this episode, Voyager encounters a swarm of space-borne lifeforms, which mistake the vessel for a member of their species. The presence of the aliens induce a premature mating cycle in Kes (Jennifer Lien), causing her and Neelix (Ethan Phillips) to question whether or not they are ready to have children.

Taylor incorporated Diggs’ suggestion to name a character "Samantha Wildman" after an organ donor who saved his wife's life. The script was Biller's first work for the series and earned him a permanent spot on the Voyager writing staff after impressing the producers. The episode received Nielsen ratings of 5.7/9 percent, placing it in 87th position for the week overall. The episode was praised by the cast, and although director Winrich Kolbe was satisfied, he felt that Kes could have been taken further in the episode. Critics gave the episode a mixed response, lauding Lien's performance while criticizing the character dynamics and the message about women wanting motherhood.

== Plot ==
On stardate 48921.3, USS Voyager encounters a cloud of space-dwelling lifeforms, and Captain Janeway (Kate Mulgrew) takes the ship in for a closer look. The ship is soon drawn in and engulfed by the swarm of creatures, whose proximity disables the helm controls and shields. The crew endeavor to escape without harming the swarm, but when the creatures begin attaching themselves to the hull, they wreak even more havoc on the ship's systems. A version of the creatures as large as Voyager arrives, and the crew realize that they have been mistaken for another of the species; the smaller creatures are attempting to mate with the ship. When the larger creature attacks, Voyager adopts a position of submission, based on behavior the crew observed in the smaller members of the species. Losing interest, the smaller creatures detach from Voyager and allow it to leave.

In response to Voyager's exposure to the swarm, Kes (Jennifer Lien) begins eating abnormally, including insects and soil. In sickbay, she has a fever, a dangerously elevated pulse and blood pressure, and a tumorous growth on her back. She resists the Doctor’s (Robert Picardo) treatment and locks herself in his office, finally relenting only to explain to Captain Janeway that she's undergoing the elogium: the Ocampa mating cycle. This process only happens once and usually affects Ocampa between four and five years old—but Kes is not even two. Neelix (Ethan Phillips) and Kes agonize over whether to have children and the ramifications of becoming parents. After discussing children and family with Lieutenant Tuvok (Tim Russ), Neelix decides he's ready to be a father, while Kes has instead decided against it. Ultimately, because the Doctor believes the elogium was artificially induced by the creatures' proximity to the ship, it may come upon her again later in her life when she is ready.

Throughout the episode, concerns arise over shipboard fraternization. After Captain Janeway and Chakotay (Robert Beltran) discuss whether the ship is an appropriate place to raise children, Ensign Samantha Wildman (Nancy Hower) announces that she is pregnant by her husband, who is still in the Alpha Quadrant.

== Production ==
"The Alamak" and "The Running" were temporary titles during the development of the episode, before settling on the final title: "Elogium". The episode was originally written for the show's first season, but was held over by UPN to give the second season a jump-start on other networks' programming. In other countries, including the United Kingdom, the episode was included in the first season. Executive producer and co-creator Jeri Taylor described "Elogium" as a fitting end to that season "because it leaves us with the revelation that someone aboard the U.S.S. Voyager is pregnant!" Though the production of the episode required extensive computer graphics, "Elogium"'s production required little other extra production features like extra cast or sets, making it a bottle episode.

Jimmy Diggs wrote the A-story of "Elogium" based on an experience he had while serving in the United States Navy. One starless night when he was tasked with cleaning the ship as it came into port, giant spotlights were employed to assist the sailors. As the ship traveled, Diggs witnessed the gradual accumulation of thousands of sea creatures following the ship. That "special, unique memory" was the basis for his first script sold to Star Trek. He was already working as an intern on the staff on the basis of a previous script when he met with Taylor and Brannon Braga to pitch further stories, including "Elogium". He later said that the story was sold on the strength of a single line of dialogue: when the crew finally figures out how to shed the alien creatures, Tuvok's line of "Captain, I believe that we've lost our sex appeal." made Braga laugh and caused him to "say the magic word, 'Sold.'" With this, Diggs became the third African American to write for Star Trek. The composition of shots including the Voyager and the alien creatures were accomplished with heavy use of computer-generated imagery (CGI) produced by Amblin Imaging and Santa Barbara Studios. When viewing the alien swarm at a distance, the special effect was a composition from magnified footage of sperm. When viewed close-up however, the alien swarm was computer-generated. Jeri Taylor rewrote the script to weave in Kes' need to mate as the B-story.

Diggs later wrote to Jeri Taylor, requesting a character be named after Samantha Wildman, a young girl whose kidney donation saved his wife's life. Taylor wrote in the character of Samantha Wildman, who recurred as the department head of xenobiology because her namesake had been a fervent animal lover. Diggs described his motivation for lobbying for the name: "'I couldn't imagine the selflessness of people who, in the middle of their grief over the loss of their child, could think about someone else, could save someone else's life.' Jimmy says that in ancient times, the gods would immortalize heroes by placing them in the stars. 'Samantha Wildman will live on,' he says. 'She's taken her [place] in the stars.'"

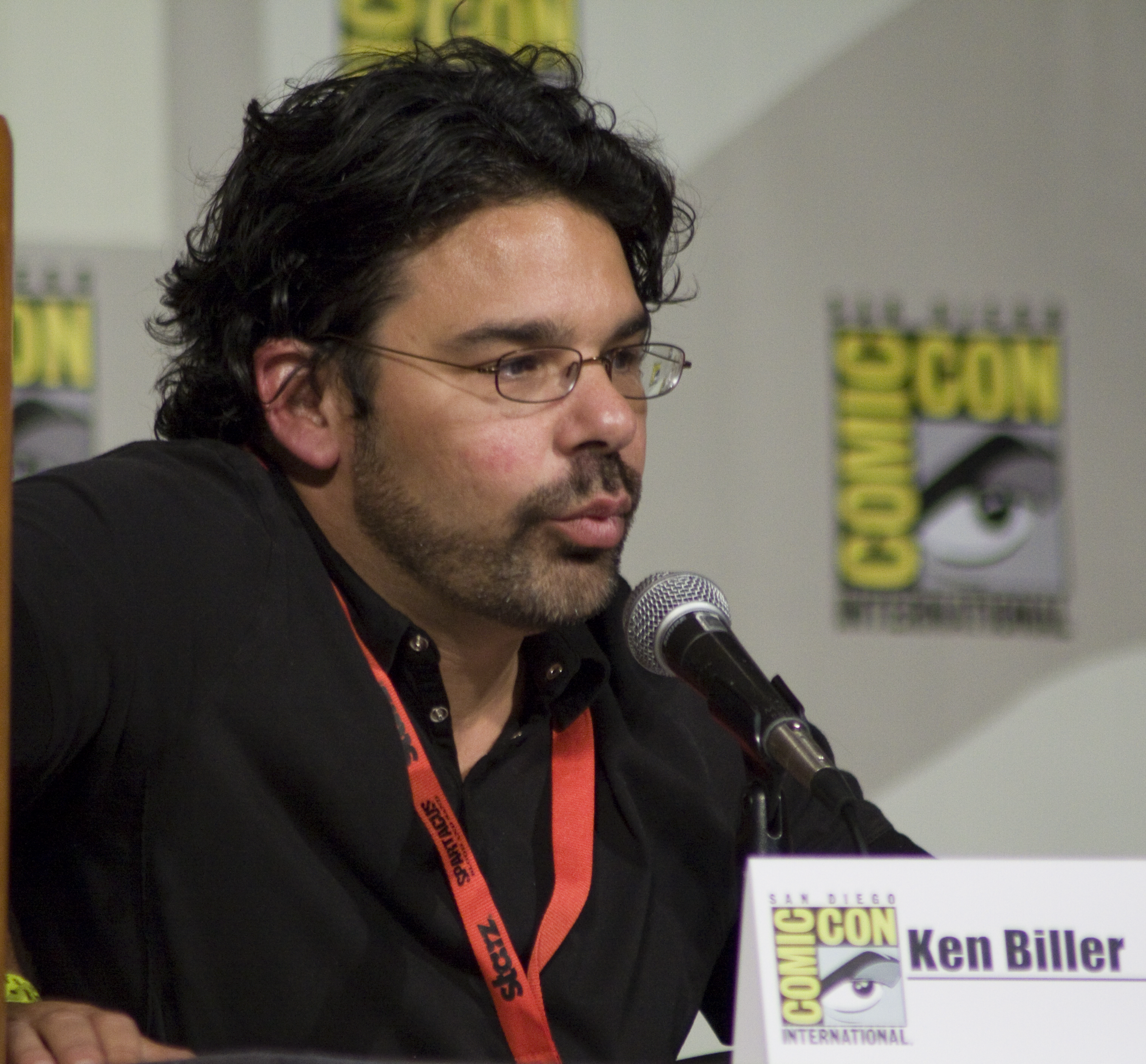
Kenneth Biller at the 2009 Comic-Con. Biller helped revise the initial story for the teleplay.

The teleplay was written by Kenneth Biller and Taylor; Biller wrote the A-story that focused on the swarm of alien creatures while Taylor focused on the B-story of Kes' elogium. Instead of writing from Digg's full prose story, Biller worked from a seven-page treatment. Biller reacted to the plot with the thought: "a show about eating and sex — these are things I know a lot about…" Biller explained in a later interview that he fought for Neelix and Kes to already be living together and having sex when drafting the teleplay, but he was shot down by Taylor and Rick Berman out of concern for Kes' young age and that it would be more interesting to show the couple grappling with this for the first time.

"Elogium" inaugurated Biller's term as a writer for Star Trek: Voyager. When he brought in the script for series co-creators Michael Piller and Jeri Taylor to review, he was told that it was a very good script. However, Piller said that "I don't think the teaser works at all." Biller received so many notes on the script that he began to feel as though the experience were an audition. After rewriting the script, Taylor expressed pleasure with Biller's technical descriptions within the script and asked if Biller had a science background; ironically, Biller had instead attended Brown University specifically to avoid taking science courses—the technical details were all made up. The day after presenting the rewrite, Taylor asked Biller to join the Voyager writing staff. Biller had been unaware of the vacancy, having come on board for the $15,000 (equivalent to about $31,700 in 2025) fee and expecting nothing more. Though initially reluctant, Biller took Taylor's offer for the "opportunity to write television that was about something." Taylor and Biller conceded that it was UPN's holding back of the episode until the second season that resulted in Ensign Wildman's strange gestation period of seven or eight months.

== Reception ==
=== Ratings ===
"Elogium" was first broadcast on September 18, 1995. According to Nielsen Media Research, it received ratings of 5.7/9 percent. This meant that it was watched by 5.7 percent of all televisions in the United States, and 9 percent of those watching television at the time. This was a decrease from the previous episode, "Projections", which received ratings of 6.1/10 percent and less than the following episode, "Non Sequitur", which was rated at 6.0/9 percent. "Elogium" was placed in 87th position overall for the highest ratings for the week of broadcast.

=== Cast and crew response ===
Several members of the cast of Voyager found the episode enjoyable. Mulgrew praised "Elogium" for her opportunity to interact with the Kes character on a maternal level. Mulgrew thought the episode was a great vessel for Lien to stretch her acting chops, calling her "a constant and wonderful surprise." Lien herself thought that the episode was a great vehicle to learn more about her character and the Ocampa species; she said "[i]t really took my character to a different level." Russ thought that "Elogium" (along with "Emanations") were stories that challenged concepts, ideas, attitudes, and traditions—all things that Star Trek creator Gene Roddenberry originally wrote science fiction about: "That, I think, is the most important part of Star Trek." Director Winrich Kolbe praised Lien's performance in "Elogium", but was disappointed that he could not take the character even further, saying that "[t]he show went soft at the end." Kolbe complained that it was not uncommon for a wonderful concept to fall victim to a failing of courage and determination.

=== Critical response ===
However, critics had a more mixed response. In his book Delta Quadrant: The unofficial guide to Voyager, David McIntee found Chakotay's revelation and Lien's acting the only high points of the episode. Otherwise, he felt the "sexual-politics statements" were cheesy and overdone, and that all of the possible clichés of Kes' elogium (puberty, PMS, pregnancy, abortion, and menopause) were trodden upon and ill-used. McIntee accused the plot of being dull and the acting as subpar; although he thought the plot was supposed to touch on teenage pregnancy, it instead emphasized that all women wish to be mothers, and all men are "immature bastards." He rated the episode 1 out of 10. Reviewers Lance Parkin and Mark Jones thought the episode was "Voyager at its very worst", repeating fans' complaints that if Ocampan women only give birth once their population would eventually disappear as it would halve every generation.

Cinefantastique's Dale Kutzera thought the episode flowed well, and that the treknobabble was reasonable and logical, but that the episode did not make good use of the characters. He said that each character fitted a certain role: Neelix was the jealous boyfriend, B'Elanna Torres (Roxann Dawson) was the shoot-first Klingon, and Kes was the perky-looking alien sounding board for other characters. Furthermore, Kutzera felt that the themes of the episode were more appropriate for an early first-season episode, not being as pertinent or believable a year later. He gave the episode 2.5 out of 4 stars.

In 2020, ScreenRant ranked this episode as one of the top ten worst episodes of Star Trek: Voyager.

== Home media release ==
The first home media release for "Elogium" came as part of a two episode release on VHS alongside "Projections" in the United Kingdom in 1995. In the United States, it was released on a single episode cassette on September 5, 2000. The episode was first released on DVD as part of the second season box set (in both the UK and the US) in 2004.
