= Neelix =

Fictional character in Star Trek: Voyager

- Star Trek character
- First appearance: "Caretaker" (1995)
- Last appearance: "Endgame" (2001)
- Portrayed by: Ethan Phillips

In-universe information
- Species: Talaxian (part Mylean)
- Affiliation: Starfleet
- Posting: Advisor; Cook; Morale Officer; Ambassador; USS Voyager

Neelix (/ˈniːlɪks/) is a character in the science fiction television series Star Trek: Voyager, played by actor Ethan Phillips since the series' inception. Neelix is an alien native to the far side of the galaxy, who joins the crew of the United Federation of Planets starship USS Voyager after it is captured and flung to the Delta Quadrant by a mysterious shockwave. He serves as a cook, morale officer, and eventual ambassador for the crew.

== Casting ==
Neelix was played by actor Ethan Phillips. Phillips has a master's degree in fine arts from Cornell University, and had his start in acting performing on Broadway shows.

== Biography ==
The character of Neelix is from Rinax, a moon of the planet Talax, located in the Delta Quadrant of the show's fictional representation of the Milky Way galaxy. His entire family was killed in a conflict with the Haakonian race.

Neelix was introduced in "Caretaker", the two-part pilot episode of the series, where he was rescued along with his Ocampan lover Kes by the Voyager crew. Previously a space trader, Neelix states his familiarity with the Delta Quadrant and appoints himself the ship's cook. He later earns the titles of Morale Officer and Chief Ambassador. When Naomi Wildman becomes the first baby born aboard Voyager, her mother Samantha names Neelix as her daughter's godfather.

Neelix departs the show in the seventh season's 23rd episode "Homestead". The ship encounters a colony of Talaxians, the last of his species that he is likely to see as the ship travels further from his home, and he chooses to stay with them. The character returns for a cameo in the series finale, "Endgame".

== The Star Trek Cookbook ==
The persona of Neelix is also the central character in The Star Trek Cookbook, published by Pocket Books/Star Trek; 1st edition (January 1, 1999; ISBN 978-0671000226) by Ethan Phillips and William J. Birnes. The cookbook includes contributions by Star Trek actors from across several series and movies, as the cook of the USS Voyager accounts for the eclectic task of feeding its 140 diverse crew members. The recipe book also features a fictional guide for whipping up the drinks served at Quark's.

The cookbook has real recipes often named after Alien meals from the Star Trek universe, but prepared with traditional real-life ingredients. There is also a section that discusses how food props were made for the television show by Alan Simms.

== Reception ==
In 2018, The Wrap ranked Neelix as the fourth-worst character of Star Trek overall (out of 39 main characters), but noted his optimism and humour. In 2016, the character was ranked as the 62nd most important character in service to Starfleet within the Star Trek science fiction universe (out of 100 characters) by Wired magazine.

In 2019, TMZ remembered Neelix as the "super-friendly chef, navigator and ambassador" of Star Trek: Voyager.

In 2020, SyFy felt that Neelix had a hard time getting good storylines compared to the other characters, with an exception being "Mortal Coil", which they ranked the 12th best episode of Star Trek: Voyager.

In 2021, The Digital Fix felt "Fair Trade" was an attempt to develop the character of Neelix, who they said has a "crisis of purpose" in this episode.

Some commentators felt Kes was too young to be dating Neelix. According to Den of Geek's Juliette Harrisson, the age gap was frequently criticized online. Science fiction author Sylvia Spruck Wrigley interpreted Kes as undergoing puberty in "Elogium", noting that it raises questions about Neelix starting a relationship with a prepubescent girl. Harrisson and The Philadelphia Inquirer's Jonathan Storm wrote that the age difference could be rationalized since Kes and Neelix are aliens with different biology than humans.
