= USS Voyager (Star Trek) =

Fictional spacecraft in Star Trek

USS Voyager (NCC-74656)
- The USS Voyager, NCC-74656
- First appearance: "Caretaker" (1995) (Star Trek: Voyager)
- Last appearance: "Twovix" (2023) (Star Trek: Lower Decks)

Information
- Launched: 2371
- Captain: Kathryn Janeway

General characteristics
- Class: Intrepid
- Registry: NCC-74656
- Armaments: Tricobalt devices Photon torpedoes Phasers; Bio-molecular warheads Transphasic torpedoes
- Defenses: Shields; Ablative generators
- Maximum speed: Warp 9.975 (5126c)
- Propulsion: Warp drive Impulse engines Reaction control thrusters
- Length: 344 meters
- Width: 116 meters

USS Voyager (NCC-74656) is the Intrepid-class starship which is the primary setting of the science fiction television series Star Trek: Voyager. It is commanded by Captain Kathryn Janeway. Voyager was designed by Star Trek: Voyager production designer Richard D. James and illustrator Rick Sternbach. In the beginning of the series models were used for the ship's onscreen appearances. This gradually changed to more computer-generated imagery (CGI) as the series went on. The ship's motto, as engraved on its dedication plaque, is a quotation from the poem "Locksley Hall" by Alfred, Lord Tennyson: "For I dipt in to the future, far as human eye could see; Saw the vision of the world, and all the wonder that would be."

Voyager made its television debut in January 1995 in "Caretaker", the most expensive pilot in television history up to that point, reportedly costing $23 million. In addition to its namesake television show, the spacecraft appeared in the computer game Star Trek: Voyager Elite Force (2000). The spacecraft design was also used for Star Trek: The Experience, a theme park in Las Vegas from 1998 to 2008, and as album art.

== Concept and design ==
Rick Sternbach, who designed the Borg cube for The Next Generation, and Richard James collaborated over several months to design the USS Voyager. Sternbach started work on the new design in the fall of 1993 when the new series was announced. By the spring of 1994, the design had started to mature, and was smaller than The Next Generation's Enterprise-D with features like the ability to land on a planet's surface. The interior design focused on the bridge, which set the tone for the rest of ship. Throughout the design process, the main goal was to make it new and appealing while still holding in part to the same familiar design.

Voyager special effect shots were done with both miniatures and CGI. The miniature shots of the Voyager model were used as a benchmark to improve the CGI shots. Two different computer models were developed from the physical model by two different companies that scanned it, Amblin Imaging and Foundation Imaging. Amblin won an Emmy for Voyager's opening CGI title visuals featuring USS Voyager passing through space, but the weekly episode exteriors were captured with hand-built miniatures of Voyager. By late 1996 (midway through season three), certain exterior shots were fully CGI. Another challenge of the design was coordinating the interior set design with exterior shots, in particular the location of key rooms and the design of windows. These were important, for example, in shots that crossed over from outside the spacecraft to inside the spacecraft in one filming shot.

The principal model of Voyager used for filming sold at a Christie's auction in 2006 for 132,000 USD.

=== In-Universe History ===
The beginning of the series saw Voyager being launched in 2371. The crew's first mission was to track down a Maquis ship in the Badlands. An alien force called the Caretaker transported both Voyager and the Maquis vessel across 70,000 light-years to the Delta Quadrant, damaging Voyager and killing several crewmembers including the medical staff, helm officer, first officer and the chief engineer. The Maquis ship would be destroyed in battle with the Kazon, a local race of antagonistic scavengers, but the crew successfully evacuated to Voyager first. Voyager becomes stranded in the Delta Quadrant when Captain Janeway decides to honor the Caretaker's dying request to destroy his technology to prevent its use against the Ocampans, a species the Caretaker had been caring for on a nearby planet. Both crews are forced to integrate and learn to work together for the anticipated 75-year journey home.

The intended crew complement was 141 Starfleet personnel, though it held 153 for its inaugural mission. This figure fluctuated during its time in the Delta Quadrant, gaining or losing count due to mishaps, adopted crew, births, and voluntary departures. At the start of the second year of their journey they had 152 people on board, and at one point during the fifth, there were 150.

Starfleet Command eventually becomes aware of the ship's presence in the Delta Quadrant. Starfleet Officer Reginald Barclay eventually manages to establish the first communication between Starfleet and Voyager, and is later able to develop methods for regular contact. After a seven-year journey, during which the acquisition of new technologies and assistance from various allies had already enabled the ship to travel a distance that otherwise would have taken over thirty years, the ship returned to the Alpha Quadrant via a Borg transwarp conduit.

In the Star Trek: Lower Decks season 4 premiere "Twovix", Voyager is being converted into a museum when a dormant macrovirus wreaks havoc on the ship. After the incident is concluded, Voyager is retired to a museum with the episode's events being added to its exhibits.

In Star Trek: Prodigy season 2, Voyager is replaced by the USS Voyager-A which is described by the Doctor as being a Lamarr-class science vessel retrofitted with technologies that Voyager brought back from the Delta Quadrant. The new ship is commanded by now-Vice Admiral Janeway on its maiden voyage. There are several references made to the original Voyager with Janeway having a model of the ship in her ready room. During this time, Janeway also celebrates the 14th anniversary of her command of Voyager which was Janeway's first command.

Voyager is seen briefly in the Star Trek: Picard third-season episode "The Bounty" as part of Starfleet's Fleet Museum.

=== Design and capabilities ===
The 15-deck (257 rooms), 700,000-metric-ton (690,000-long-ton; 770,000-short-ton) Voyager was built at the Utopia Planitia Fleet Yards and launched from Earth Station McKinley.

Voyager was equipped with 47 bio-neural gel packs and two holodecks. It was equipped with a class-9 warp drive, allowing for a maximum sustainable speed of Warp 9.975. Variable geometry pylons allowed Voyager and other Intrepid-class ships to exceed warp 5 without damaging subspace. Like the Galaxy class, Voyager's warp nacelles were below the primary hull. The ship also was capable of planetary landings.

Voyager also had an Emergency Medical Hologram (EMH) programmed with a library of more than five million different medical treatments from 2,000 medical references and 47 physicians.

The ship was initially equipped with 40 photon torpedoes with type VI warheads, two of which were equipped with tricobalt devices. Both tricobalt devices were used to destroy the Caretaker's array. Quantum torpedoes were also compatible with Voyager's launchers, with some modifications. Voyager housed five standard torpedo launchers (two fore, two aft, one ventral) and was able to fire up to four torpedoes per launcher at once. In the final episode, an alternate future Kathryn Janeway equipped the ship with transphasic torpedoes and ablative hull armor.

During the years in the Delta Quadrant, the ship is augmented with custom, non-spec upgrades and modifications, some of which are modified from technology of other cultures, an example being Seven of Nine's alcoves and the Delta Flyer which both utilize modified Borg technology. Several pieces of technology from the future were also installed in the final episode, courtesy of Admiral Janeway who went back in time to bring Voyager home. Some of the adaptive solutions are to compensate for the disadvantages of being 70,000 light-years (4.4×10^{9} AU) from port, such as the airponics bay and the transformation of the Captain's dining room to a galley, and the acquisition of enhancements from aliens in the Void that massively increases replicator efficiency.

Cargo bay 2 is equipped with several Borg alcoves when Captain Janeway forms an alliance with the Borg and several Borg are forced to work aboard Voyager during the alliance. Seven of Nine and Harry Kim construct an astrometrics lab from scratch with Borg-enhanced sensors, knowledge of which Seven of Nine retained from the Borg.

== Shuttlecraft ==
Voyager departed the Alpha Quadrant with a complement of Class 2 and Class 6 shuttlecraft. Though a number were lost over the course of their journey, Voyager was observed still having shuttles available through the penultimate episode of the series.

Voyager's shuttle complement was eventually supplemented by a spacecraft called the Delta Flyer. The Delta Flyer was introduced in the Season 5 episode "Extreme Risk" and was designed and constructed by the crew in that episode. The ship would go on to appear through the end of the series. The design of the fictional spacecraft by the production staff and how it was presented in special effects has been written about in books about the franchise. The Delta Flyer was designed by illustrator Rich Sternbach, and exterior views were rendered by computer graphics by Foundation Imaging.

One of Voyager's shuttles, the Aeroshuttle, was integrated with the hull in the saucer section and although it was never used in an episode, the production team did develop special effects test footage of it disembarking. Voyager's Aeroshuttle was intended as a warp-capable vessel that could also fly in atmospheres; the footage was made by CGI team leaders Rob Bonchune and Adam Lebowitz, along with the VFX producer Dan Curry. Two other craft, the Manta and Cochrane were also developed but the Manta was not used. Cochrane was used in "Threshold" for the purpose of reaching warp 10.

== Presentations ==
In addition to its namesake television show, the spacecraft appeared in the computer game Star Trek: Voyager Elite Force (2000). The spacecraft design was also used for Star Trek: The Experience, a theme park in Las Vegas from 1998 to 2008, and as album art. The designs was shown on cover art for LaserDisc releases also.

=== In computer gaming ===
The Voyager design appeared in Star Trek: Voyager which originally aired on UPN network from 1995 to 2001, but was also used in a number of computer and video games in that period in various capacities. One was Star Trek: Voyager – Elite Force which came out in 2000. This was a computer game style known as a first-person shooter and received a positive reception by the gaming community at that time. Voyager Elite Force was ranked second out of ten of the best Star Trek games up to 2015. Its sequel was published in 2003. One game based on the show, Voyager (circa 1995), was cancelled but has been an influence on other games since.

=== Merchandise ===
The model-making company Revell released a plastic model of USS Voyager. Another pre-built offering was made of metal, and a reviewer praised the "swooshy" 'arrowhead' style of the design. The form of the design commonly appears in relation to Voyager merchandise, or elsewhere in places that make use of Star Trek franchise content; for example, a view of USS Voyager was shown as album art for a 4-CD music collection from the show released in 2017.

== Production ==
In late October 1994, the USS Voyager model was delivered to Image G, who did the motion control photography video work with the model for the special effects shots for the upcoming launch of the Star Trek: Voyager television show. Image G also did the motion control photography for the Caretaker Array, as well as for the Maquis and Kazon vessels.

The main sets for the interior of the spacecraft were located at Stage 8 and Stage 9 at Paramount Studios.

One of the more complex sets for the spacecraft was the bridge of Voyager. The bridge of Voyager had 11 different monitors of three different sizes, that had custom graphics displayed depending on what was being shot for each scene. For a scene with the "red alert" setting, the appropriate video graphics would have to be displayed on cue. These graphics were created a by a team of people, with a need for both static and video graphics. Depending on the episode, custom graphics or video sequences would have to be made by a creative team. The videos were recorded to videocassette to be played at the right time, such as when an actor (e.g. Voyager crew) was looking at a monitor.

The ship's design and sets were also used in the Star Trek: Deep Space Nine episode "Inter Arma Enim Silent Leges", this time as the Intrepid Class USS Bellerophon.

== See also ==
- Enterprise (NX-01) (Enterprise 2001–2005)
- USS Enterprise (NCC–1701) (Star Trek 1966–1969)
- USS Defiant (Deep Space Nine 1994–1999)
