= Outline of Star Trek =

Overview of and topical guide to Star Trek

The following outline is provided as an overview of and topical guide to Star Trek:

Star Trek is an American science fiction entertainment franchise, created by Gene Roddenberry, which started in 1966 with the television series Star Trek (now known as Star Trek: The Original Series). With spin-offs, the franchise now includes twelve television series (nine live action, and three animated) totalling 814 episodes across 38 television seasons, as well as 13 feature films. The Star Trek franchise also includes a large number of novels, comic books, video games and other materials, which are generally considered non-canon.

== Star Trek ==
Star Trek can be described as all of the following:

- Fiction – a form of narrative which deals, in part or in whole, with events that are not factual, but rather, imaginary and invented by its author(s). Although fiction often describes a major branch of literary work, it is also applied to theatrical, cinematic and musical work.
  - Science fiction – a genre of fiction with imaginative but more or less plausible content such as settings in the future, futuristic science and technology, space travel, parallel universes, aliens, and paranormal abilities. Exploring the consequences of scientific innovations is one purpose of science fiction, making it a "literature of ideas".
    - Space opera – a subgenre of science fiction that emphasizes romantic, often melodramatic adventure, set mainly or entirely in outer space, usually involving conflict between opponents possessing advanced technologies and abilities. The term has no relation to music and it is analogous to "soap opera".
    - Space Western – a subgenre of science fiction, primarily grounded in film and television programming, that transposes themes of American Western books and film to a backdrop of futuristic space frontiers; it is the complement of the science fiction Western, which transposes science fiction themes onto an American Western setting.
  - Setting – setting includes the historical moment in time and geographic location in which a story takes place, and helps initiate the main backdrop and mood for a story. The setting has been referred to as story world or milieu to include a context (especially society) beyond the immediate surroundings of the story. Elements of setting may include culture, historical period, geography, and hour. Along with plot, character, theme and style, the setting is considered one of the fundamental components of fiction.
    - Fictional location – a place that exists only in fiction and not in reality. Writers may create and describe such places to serve as the backdrop for their stories to take place in. The setting may be of any scope, from a specific spaceship or building to a neighborhood, city, country, world, galaxy or universe.
      - Fictional universe – self-consistent fictional setting with elements that differ from the real world. It may also be called an imagined, constructed or fictional realm (or world).
        - Science fiction universe – universe with elements of fictional technology or science.
- Intellectual property – creations of the intellect for which a monopoly is assigned to designated owners by law. Under intellectual property law, owners are granted certain exclusive rights to a variety of intangible assets, such as musical, literary and artistic works; discoveries and inventions; and words, phrases, symbols and designs. The typical intellectual property rights granted for fictional works are copyright and trademark.
  - Media franchise – licensing of intellectual property of an original work of media (usually a work of fiction), such as a film, a work of literature, a television program or a video game, to others. This licensing may involve trademarked characters and settings. Generally, a media franchise means that a whole series is made in a particular medium, along with licensing to others for merchandising and endorsements.

== Media ==
=== Canonical media ===
- Considered official Star Trek canon.

==== Star Trek television series ====
- Star Trek – the first television series to follow the adventures of the Starship Enterprise and its crew and set in the 23rd century. Now referred to as Star Trek: The Original Series, for clarity.
- Star Trek – an animated series set after the live action series. It features the voices of the original cast. Now referred as Star Trek: The Animated Series for clarity.
- Star Trek: The Next Generation – created by Gene Roddenberry twenty-one years after the original, the first episode takes place in 2364. It featured a new Enterprise, new technology and an entirely new cast.
- Star Trek: Deep Space Nine – set in the Next Generation era, this spin-off series is set on the titular space station, situated on the edge of Federation territory.
- Star Trek: Voyager – another spin-off series set in the Next Generation era, set aboard the starship Voyager as its crew attempt to return home after getting transported and lost far away from Federation space.
- Star Trek: Enterprise – a prequel series set on an early iteration of the Enterprise set in the nearby regions of the Milky Way galaxy around the year 2150, over a century before the original Star Trek series.
- Star Trek: Discovery – a series initially taking place shortly before the era of Star Trek: The Original Series and set aboard the Discovery. The first episode takes place in 2256.
- Star Trek: Short Treks – an anthology web series of 10-20 minute shorts related to Discovery, which explore the Star Trek universe and characters.
- Star Trek: Picard – the first episode takes place in 2399, twenty years after the event of feature film Star Trek: Nemesis. It continues the story of former Enterprise captain Jean-Luc Picard.
- Star Trek: Lower Decks – a comedic adult animated series focusing on the support crew of one of Starfleet's most unimportant ships. It takes place shortly after the Next Generation era.
- Star Trek: Prodigy – an animated series aimed at kids, set after the events of Voyager and following a motley crew of young aliens who must learn to work together.
- Star Trek: Strange New Worlds – a spinoff from Discovery and prequel to The Original Series following Captain Christopher Pike and the crew of the USS Enterprise.
- Star Trek: Starfleet Academy - set in the 32nd century time period introduced in Discovery, this follows the first new class of Starfleet cadets in over a century as they come of age and train to be officers.

===== Star Trek television episodes =====
- Star Trek episodes
  - Star Trek: The Original Series episodes
  - Star Trek: The Animated Series episodes
  - Star Trek: The Next Generation episodes
  - Star Trek: Deep Space Nine episodes
  - Star Trek: Voyager episodes
  - Star Trek: Enterprise episodes
  - Star Trek: Discovery episodes
  - Star Trek: Picard episodes
  - Star Trek: Lower Decks episodes
  - Star Trek: Prodigy episodes
  - Star Trek: Strange New Worlds episodes

==== Star Trek films ====
- Star Trek film series – Paramount Pictures has produced thirteen Star Trek feature films. The first six films continue the adventures of the cast of the Original Series; the seventh film, Generations, was designed as a transition from that cast to the Next Generation series; the next three films, 8–10, focused completely on the Next Generation cast. The eleventh, twelfth and thirteenth films take place in an alternate timeline from the rest of the franchise with an almost entirely new cast playing the original series characters.
  - Films corresponding to the Original Series era
    - Star Trek: The Motion Picture (1979) – V-Ger, an advanced intelligence from another dimension, visits Earth seeking its Creator, and is about to eradicate the Earth's infestation of humans, but has to deal with Captain Kirk and his crew aboard the USS Enterprise first.
    - Star Trek II: The Wrath of Khan (1982) – Khan Noonien Singh, a genetically enhanced warlord exiled with his followers by Captain Kirk on a desolate planet for decades, escapes and vows revenge. A cat and mouse contest ensues between them for the Genesis Device, a mechanism capable of destroying a planet and rebuilding its life matrix at the same time.
    - Star Trek III: The Search for Spock (1984) – Spock was killed in the previous movie. Or was he? And Doctor McCoy isn't behaving quite like himself. Admiral Kirk reassembles his crew and steals the Enterprise to search for his lost friend and bring him back from beyond the grave.
    - Star Trek IV: The Voyage Home (1986) – the crew returns home with a rejuvenated Spock, in a captured Klingon vessel and certainly subject to facing court martial. When they arrive, they find the Earth apparently besieged by a powerful alien spacecraft broadcasting in Whale. In order to save Earth from the craft's destructive signal, they attempt to travel back in time to find a humpback whale to communicate with the alien craft to tell it that all is well.
    - Star Trek V: The Final Frontier (1989) – the newly commissioned USS Enterprise-A is commandeered by Spock's long-lost half-brother. The crew travels to the center of the galaxy where they meet an alien portraying itself as God, who wants their starship.
    - Star Trek VI: The Undiscovered Country (1991) – Captain Kirk and Doctor McCoy are imprisoned for the assassination of the Klingon Chancellor Gorkon. Spock takes command of the Enterprise and embarks on a rescue mission while he uncovers a conspiracy.
  - Films corresponding to the Next Generation era
    - Star Trek Generations (1994) – Captain Picard races against time to stop a deranged scientist from destroying an entire star system. In the process, he ends up meeting an unlikely ally: Captain Kirk.
    - Star Trek: First Contact (1996) – Captain Picard and the crew battle the Borg in the past to save humanity in the present. In the process, they ensure that Zefram Cochrane makes his maiden flight at warp speed.
    - Star Trek: Insurrection (1998) – the crew of the Enterprise battles a renegade Starfleet operation who plans to destroy a mystical planet in the name of science.
    - Star Trek: Nemesis (2002) – Captain Picard and the crew battle a clone of himself who has taken control of Romulan space and intends to invade Federation space.
  - Films in the reboot (Kelvin Timeline) franchise
    - Star Trek (2009) – in the 24th century, Spock and a Romulan warlord are sent back to the 23rd century through a black hole, disrupting the timeline and forcing the young crew of the USS Enterprise to come together earlier, despite their differences, after the warlord destroys Vulcan.
    - Star Trek Into Darkness (2013) – a Starfleet special agent who later reveals himself as Khan Noonien Singh turns terrorist and destroys a Starfleet base on Earth and the newly reinstated Captain Kirk is ordered to take the Enterprise to the Klingon homeworld to dispose of him.
    - Star Trek Beyond (2016) – the Enterprise is ambushed and destroyed by countless alien microvessels; the crew abandon ship and are stranded on an unknown planet where they find themselves in battle with a ruthless warlord who has a well-earned hatred of the Federation.
  - Films set after the early Discovery era:
    - Star Trek: Section 31 (2025) – Follows Philippa Georgiou on a mission with Section 31 to prevent a powerful weapon from falling into dangerous hands.

=== Non-Canonical media ===
==== Star Trek books ====
- Star Trek reference books
- List of Star Trek technical manuals
- List of Star Trek novels
- List of Star Trek: Voyager novels
- New Voyages episodes
- List of Star Trek: New Frontier characters

==== Star Trek Fan Productions ====
===== Fan films and series =====
- Star Trek: Phase II (formerly known as Star Trek: New Voyages)
- Star Trek Continues
- Star Trek: Encarta
- Starship Exeter
- Starship Farragut
- Star Trek: Hidden Frontier
- Star Trek: Intrepid
- Star Trek: Of Gods and Men
- Star Trek: Odyssey
- Star Trek: Dark Armada
- Borg War (animated)
- Dreadnought Dominion

====== Fan film parodies ======
- Captain's Nightmare
- Redshirt Blues
- Star Trek: The Pepsi Generation
- Star Wreck (series)
- Steam Trek
- Stone Trek

===== Fan audio productions =====
- Star Trek: The Continuing Mission
- Star Trek: Defiant
- Star Trek: Outpost
- Star Trek: Excelsior

== Setting ==
=== People in Star Trek ===
==== Races in Star Trek ====
- Alphabetical list of Star Trek races
- Major races in Star Trek
  - Human – aka Terran, are one of the races undertaking interstellar travel. Human beings were instrumental in the founding of the United Federation of Planets. Although politically fragmented at the end of the 20th century, Humans underwent political unification and made first contact with the Vulcan race in 2063.
  - Vulcan – extraterrestrial humanoid species who originate from the planet Vulcan. They are noted for their attempt to live by reason and logic with no interference from emotion.
  - Klingon – extraterrestrial humanoid warrior species originating from the planet Qo'nos. An antagonist in the Original Series, turned ally of the Federation in the Next Generation era.
  - Romulan – extraterrestrial humanoid species from the planet Romulus. Generally depicted as antagonists, and are usually at war or in an uneasy truce with the United Federation of Planets.
  - Borg – collection of species that have been turned into cybernetic organisms functioning as drones of the Collective, or the hive. An enemy of all species, seeking to absorb them all. Introduced during the Next Generation.
  - Cardassian – extraterrestrial species originating from the fictional Alpha Quadrant planet, Cardassia Prime. Introduced during the Next Generation era, and located in the vicinity of Deep Space Nine.
  - Bajoran – extraterrestrial species originating from the fictional Alpha Quadrant planet, Bajor. Introduced during the Next Generation era. In the Deep Space Nine era, Bajor is recovering from fifty years of occupation from the Cardassians.
  - Ferengi – extraterrestrial species whose culture is characterized by a mercantile obsession with profit and trade, and their constant efforts to swindle unwary customers into unfair deals. They are also known for their business acumen and for rampant misogyny. Introduced during the Next Generation era, and located in the vicinity of Deep Space Nine.

==== Characters in Star Trek ====
- Crews of the USS Enterprise
  - NCC-1701 (The Original Series)
    - Captain James T. Kirk
      - Kirk and Uhura's kiss
    - Captain Christopher Pike
    - Chief Science Officer Spock
    - Chief Medical Officer Leonard McCoy
    - Chief Communications Officer Nyota Uhura
    - Chief Engineering Officer Montgomery Scott
    - Ensign Pavel Chekov
    - Lieutenant Hikaru Sulu
    - Yeoman Janice Rand
    - Nurse Christine Chapel
  - The Next Generation
    - Captain Jean-Luc Picard
    - Chief Medical Officer Beverly Crusher
    - Chief Medical Officer Katherine Pulaski
    - Chief Engineering Officer Geordi La Forge
    - Commander William Riker
    - Lieutenant Commander Data
    - Chief Security Officer Worf
    - Chief Security Officer Tasha Yar
    - Ship's Counselor Deanna Troi
    - Ensign Wesley Crusher
  - Star Trek: Enterprise
    - Captain Jonathan Archer
    - Science officer T'Pol
    - Chief engineer Trip Tucker
    - Tactical officer Malcolm Reed
    - Communications officer Hoshi Sato
    - Helmsman Travis Mayweather
    - Chief medical officer Dr. Phlox
- Crew of the Voyager
  - Captain Kathryn Janeway
  - First officer Chakotay
  - Second officer/Chief Tactical/Chief Security Tuvok
  - Helmsman/Medic Tom Paris
  - Chief Engineer B'Elanna Torres
  - Operations officer Harry Kim
  - Chief Medical Officer The Doctor
  - Cook/Morale Officer/ Ambassador Neelix
  - Nurse Kes
  - Astrometrics lab crewman Seven of Nine
- Command crew of Deep Space Nine (space station)
  - Commanding officer Benjamin Sisko
  - First officer Kira Nerys
  - Chief of security Odo
  - Chief medical officer Julian Bashir
  - Chief science officer Jadzia Dax
  - Counselor Ezri Dax
  - Strategic operations officer Worf
  - Chief operations officer Miles O'Brien
- Crew of the Discovery
  - Captain Gabriel Lorca
  - Captain Christopher Pike
  - Chief Medical Officer Nambue
  - Commander Michael Burnham
  - Commander Saru
  - Lieutenant Commander Paul Stamets
  - Ensign Connor
  - Ensign Sylvia Tilly
- Alphabetical list of Star Trek characters
  - Star Trek characters (A–F)
  - Star Trek characters (G–M)
  - Star Trek characters (N–S)
  - Star Trek characters (T–Z)

=== Astronomy in Star Trek ===
==== Regions of space in Star Trek ====
- Star Trek regions of space
  - Milky Way galaxy
    - Galactic quadrant – in Star Trek, the Milky Way galaxy is divided into four galactic quadrants: Alpha, Beta, Delta and Gamma.
    - Galactic Core – central area of the Milky Way galaxy, lying partially in each of the four galactic quadrants.
    - Sector – a sector was a volume of space approximately twenty light years across. A typical sector in Federation space would contain about six to ten star systems, although sectors toward the galactic core would often contain many more.
  - Subspace – Subspace is an integral part of the space-time continuum, distinct, yet coexistent with normal space. In Star Trek, "subspace communications" refers to a kind of faster-than-light "radio signal" and is used often to allow characters to communicate almost instantaneously across vast interstellar distances.
  - Mirror Universe – The "mirror universe" is an informal name for a parallel universe first recorded as visited by James T. Kirk and several officers from the USS Enterprise in 2267 in the episode "Mirror, Mirror". It also appears in a number of Deep Space Nine episodes, a two-part Enterprise episode and a number of Discovery episodes.
  - Q Continuum – extradimensional plane of existence inhabited by a race of extremely powerful, hyper-intelligent pan-dimensional beings known as the Q.

==== Interstellar powers in Star Trek ====
- United Federation of Planets – interstellar federal polity with, as of the year 2373, more than 150 member planets and thousands of colonies spread across 8,000 light years in the Alpha and Beta Quadrants of the Milky Way Galaxy, taking the form of a post-capitalist liberal democracy and constitutional republic.
- Klingon Empire – home of the warrior race known as the Klingons, located primarily in the Alpha Quadrant.
- Romulan Star Empire – interstellar power very similar to that of the Roman Republic before it became the Roman Empire. Romulans share a common ancestry with Vulcans, but are passionate, cunning and opportunistic — in every way the opposite of the logical Vulcans. Star Trek Star Charts place the Romulan Empire into the Beta Quadrant of the galaxy. However, on Star Trek: Deep Space Nine, they are referred to as an Alpha Quadrant power.
- Borg Collective – also referred to as the "hive mind" or "collective consciousness", the Borg Collective is a civilization with a group mind. Each Borg individual, or drone, is linked to the collective by a sophisticated subspace network that ensures each member is given constant supervision and guidance. The Borg inhabit a vast region of space in the Delta Quadrant of the galaxy, possessing thousands of vessels. They operate toward the fulfillment of one purpose: to "add the biological and technological distinctiveness of other species to [their] own... [in pursuit of] perfection".
- Ferengi Alliance – located in the Alpha Quadrant, what the Ferengi Alliance consisted of was never revealed; it may simply encompass the Ferengi homeworld Ferenginar and any uninhabited planets that the Ferengi have colonized, since there was little indication that the Ferengi government exercised authority over any species other than its own.
- Cardassian Union – Orwellian-like power located in the Alpha Quadrant, characterized by strict government control over information and violent force. Its denizens have unquestioning obedience to authority on account of the general lack of personal rights, which provides a contrast to the personal protections of the Federation.
- The Dominion – interstellar power and military superpower located in the Gamma Quadrant.
- Q Continuum – extradimensional plane of existence inhabited by a race of extremely powerful, hyper-intelligent pan-dimensional beings known as the Q.

=== History in Star Trek ===
- Timeline of Star Trek

=== Culture in Star Trek ===
- Law in Star Trek
- Sexuality in Star Trek

==== Klingon culture ====
- Klingon
- Klingon language
- The Final Reflection

==== Romulan culture ====
- Romulan
- Tal Shiar

==== Federation culture ====
- Stardate – A system of dates used to describe events in-universe regardless of culture or source planet.

===== Starfleet culture =====
- Dunsel –
- General Order 12 –
- Starfleet Academy
  - Kobayashi Maru

==== Ferengi culture ====
- Rules of Acquisition –

==== Vulcan culture ====
- Live long and prosper –
- Mind meld –
- Vulcan nerve pinch –
- Vulcan salute –
- Pon farr –

==== Star Trek terminology ====
- Barclay protomorphosis syndrome –
- Baryon Particle
- Baryon sweep –
- Bell Riots –
- Bilitrium –
- Class M planet –
- Coaxial drive –
- Cordrazine –
- Dilithium –
- Grups –
- Imzadi –
- Jefferies tube –
- Kobayashi Maru –
- Kolvoord Starburst –
- LCARS –
- M-5 –
- Neutral zone –
- Nitrium –
- Omega particle –
- Onlies –
- Operation Return –
- Pa'nar Syndrome –
- Project Genesis –
- Red alert –
- Spatial anomaly –
- Static warp bubble –
- Synthehol –
- The Picard Maneuver –
- Tranya –
- Treknobabble –
- Trellium-D –
- Vermicula –
- Xenopolycythemia –
- Yeager Loop –
- Zhian'tara –

=== Technology in Star Trek ===
- Communicator –
- Tricorder
- Star Trek materials
- Medicine in Star Trek
  - Holodiction –
  - Transporter psychosis –

==== Starship technologies ====
- Doctor
- Holodeck
- Replicator –
- Shields –
- Transporter –
- Warp drive

==== Star Trek starships ====
- B'rel class starship
- Columbia (NX-02)
- Columbus
- Copernicus
- D-7 battle cruiser
- D5 class starship
- Delta Flyer
- Delta Flyer
- Enterprise (NX-01)
- Fesarius
- Galileo
- K't'inga class starship
- K'vort class starship
- Klingon Bird of Prey
- Klingon starships
- Kronos One
- Narada
- Negh'Var class starship
- Phoenix
- Raptor class starship
- Runabout
- Scimitar
- Shuttlecraft
- Shuttlecraft Cochrane
- Shuttlecraft Justman
- Spacecraft in Star Trek
- SS Beagle
- Starship Enterprise
- Starship Wellington
- USS Adelphi
- USS Constitution (NCC-1700)
- USS Billings
- USS Bozeman (NCC-1941)
- USS Challenger (NCC-71099)
- USS Constellation
- USS da Vinci
- USS Dauntless (NX-01-A)
- USS Defiant
- Defiant (NCC-1764)
- USS Discovery
- USS Enterprise
  - USS Enterprise (NCC-1701)
  - USS Enterprise (NCC-1701-A)
  - USS Enterprise (NCC-1701-B)
  - USS Enterprise (NCC-1701-C)
  - USS Enterprise (NCC-1701-D)
  - USS Enterprise (NCC-1701-E)
  - USS Enterprise (NCC-1701-J)
- USS Equinox
- USS Exeter
- USS Farragut (NCC-1647)
- USS Glenn
- USS Okinawa
- USS Raven
- USS Voyager
- Vor'cha class starship
- Voyager VI

==== Weapons in Star Trek ====
===== Star Trek energy weapons =====
- Phasers
- Pulse cannons
- Phase cannons
- Phase pistols
- Phased polaron cannon
- Disruptors
- Varon-T disruptors
- Lasers
- Whip

===== Star Trek projectile weapons =====
- Photon torpedoes
- Chroniton torpedoes
- Polaron torpedoes
- Gravimetric torpedoes
- Plasma torpedo
- Quantum torpedoes
- Spatial torpedoes
- Transphasic torpedoes
- Phased plasma torpedoes
- Positron torpedoes
- Isokinetic cannon
- TR-116 Projectile Rifle

===== Star Trek biological, radioactive, and chemical weapons =====
- Thalaron radiation
- Metreon cascade
- Trilithium resin
- Cobalt diselenide
- Aceton assimilators

===== Star Trek melee weapons =====
====== Federation melee weapons ======
- KaBar combat knife
- Katana

====== Jem'Hadar melee weapons ======
- Bayonet
- Kar'takin

====== Klingon melee weapons ======
- Bat'leth
- D'k tahg
- Qutluch
- Mek'leth

====== Romulan melee weapons ======
- Tan qalanq
- Teral'n

====== Vulcan melee weapons ======
- Lirpa
- Ahn'woon

====== Other melee weapons ======
- Ushaan-tor
- Mortaes and Thongs
- Glavin

==== Subspace weapons ====
- Isolytic burst
- Tricobalt devices

==== Other weapons ====
- Magnetometric guided charges
- Multikinetic neutronic mines
- Dreadnought
- Series 5 long range tactical armor unit
- Q firearms
- Red matter (2009 reboot)

== History of Star Trek ==
History of Star Trek

- History of Star Trek games

== Popular culture and Star Trek ==
- Cultural influence of Star Trek
- Comparison of Star Trek and Star Wars
- Galaxy Quest – parody of and homage to science-fiction films and series, especially Star Trek and its fandom
- Trekkie

== Star Trek community ==
=== Star Trek organizations ===
- Official Star Trek Fan Club

=== Star Trek publications ===
- Star Trek novels

=== Influential persons in Star Trek culture ===
- Gene Roddenberry – creator of Star Trek
- Star Trek cast members
  - List of Star Trek: The Original Series cast members
  - List of Star Trek: The Next Generation cast members
  - List of Star Trek: Deep Space Nine cast members
  - List of Star Trek: Voyager cast members
  - List of Star Trek: Enterprise cast members
- Star Trek production staff
- Star Trek composers and music
- Star Trek script writers
  - Star Trek: The Original Series writers

== Variant: Star Fleet Universe ==
Star Fleet Universe

== See also ==
- Star Fleet Universe
- Where no man has gone before
- Beam me up, Scotty
