= Infinite Regress (Star Trek: Voyager) =

- Star Trek: Voyager episode
- Episode no.: Season 5 Episode 7
- Directed by: David Livingston
- Story by: Robert J. Doherty; Jimmy Diggs
- Teleplay by: Robert J. Doherty
- Production code: 203
- Original air date: November 25, 1998

Guest appearances
- Scarlett Pomers - Naomi Wildman; Neil Maffin - Ven; Erica Mer - Human Girl

Episode chronology
← Previous "Timeless"	Next → "Nothing Human"
- Star Trek: Voyager season 5

"Infinite Regress" is the 101st episode of Star Trek: Voyager, the seventh episode of the fifth season. The show depicts a Starfleet spacecraft slowly making its way back to Earth after being stranded in the Delta Quadrant.

This science fiction story focuses on the character Seven of Nine (played by Jeri Ryan) and the Borg aliens. As in Imperfection (Star Trek: Voyager) the plot turns on the debris of a destroyed Borg ship.

== Background ==
The Borg, a Star Trek villain species famous for their phrase "resistance is futile," was introduced on Star Trek: The Next Generation in the episode "Q Who?" (S2E16) and also featured in the critically acclaimed episode "The Best of Both Worlds". They made a major influence on Voyager starting with "Scorpion", which introduced the ex-Borg character Seven of Nine to the main cast, and there were many Borg-centric episodes since that time in the show; they return with a major story once again as Seven of Nine struggles with her Borg past in "Infinite Regress".

The episode was directed by David Livingston. Livingston directed many Star Trek episodes in this era, including for Star Trek: The Next Generation (1987-1994), Star Trek: Deep Space Nine (1993-1999), Star Trek: Voyager, and Enterprise. Overall he directed 62 episodes of Star Trek, including 28 for Voyager.

== Plot ==
Continuing on course for home, Voyager's long-range sensors detect a debris field from a Borg cube. The crew decides to alter course to avoid the debris, since the Borg tend to salvage materials and parts from their vessels, and may return to the area.

As their general course takes them closer to the Borg vessel's debris field, Seven begins experiencing a form of multiple personality disorder and alternate personalities begin to manifest themselves. After several incidents witnessed by the crew, she is taken to Sickbay to try to find the source of the neurological problem. Seven speculates that it could be due to an active and undamaged vinculum (transponder device) still in the debris field from the Borg vessel. Voyager alters course to retrieve the vinculum and investigate further. Once at the debris field, they find the vinculum, still active, and beam it aboard for inspection.

Further scans reveal a synthetic pathogenic virus inhabiting it. After reviewing a number of data cubes, they deduce that the virus must have been introduced by the Borg cube's last assimilation, a small vessel carrying aliens referred to by the Borg as Species 6339. Voyager searches out these alien travelers, who reveal their attempt to infect the Borg Collective with a virus designed to shut it down. Thirteen of their people sacrificed themselves to be assimilated so they could spread the virus. Part of their plan depends on more Borg to find the vinculum and use it like a "Typhoid Mary" to spread the virus further into the Borg network.

However, Captain Janeway wants to keep the vinculum for a short period of time to give the crew time to separate Seven from it. Seven struggles to maintain control of the personalities splitting her consciousness — including some with memories of the defeat of the Starfleet battle group at Wolf 359 — while Chief Engineer B'Elanna Torres and her team begin the difficult task of shutting down the vinculum. Tuvok suggests a Vulcan mind meld to help calm Seven. The aliens protest Voyager's interference with their plan and attack the ship. In the end, B'Elanna is successful and Seven is freed from the link. The vinculum is beamed off the ship and the aliens disengage.

In the closing scenes, Seven expresses to Janeway that she is unsure how to thank the crew for their efforts to save her. Janeway tells her to report to engineering to help with maintenance and Seven agrees, but states she has one crew member to visit first. She is revealed to be assigning readings to Naomi Wildman (who had earlier tried to engage her and helped through her alternate personality episodes) to help the girl with her ambition to be "captain's assistant". After giving Naomi several PADDs with the data, Seven tentatively asks Naomi to teach her how to play Kadis-Kot, a board game played among the crew. Grinning, Naomi agrees.

== Reception ==
In 2012, Den of Geek listed this as an honorable mention for their ranking of the top ten episodes of Star Trek: Voyager.

In 2021, Comic Book Resources highlighted "Infinite Regress" for Seven of Nine (Jeri Ryan) noting it was one of the "fascinating Borg-centric entries" along with "Dark Frontier" in season 5.

In 2022, SyFy Wire included "Infinite Regress" as one of the 12 (Note: The SyFy Wire article treats the two-part / two-season episodes of "Scorpion" as one episode, doing the same for the similarly structured "Unimatrix Zero", when counting the number of episodes included in its list of 12.) "essential" Seven of Nine episodes in the franchise.

== Releases ==
This episode was released on VHS, paired with "Nothing Human".

On November 9, 2004, this episode was released as part of the season 5 DVD box set of Star Trek: Voyager. The box set includes 7 DVD optical discs with all the episodes in season 5 with some extra features, and episodes have a Dolby 5.1 Digital Audio track.

On April 25, 2001, this episode was released on LaserDisc in Japan, as part of the half-season collection, 5th Season vol.1 . This included episodes from "Night" to "Bliss" on seven double sided 12 inch optical discs, with English and Japanese audio tracks for the episodes.
