= Ethics (Star Trek: The Next Generation) =

- Star Trek: The Next Generation episode
- Episode no.: Season 5 Episode 16
- Directed by: Chip Chalmers
- Story by: Sara B. Cooper; Stuart Charno
- Teleplay by: Ronald D. Moore
- Production code: 216
- Original air date: March 2, 1992

Guest appearances
- Patti Yasutake - Alyssa Ogawa; Brian Bonsall - Alexander Rozhenko; Caroline Kava - Toby Russell

Episode chronology
← Previous "Power Play"	Next → "The Outcast"
- Star Trek: The Next Generation season 5

"Ethics" is the 116th episode of the American science fiction television series Star Trek: The Next Generation. It is the 16th episode of the fifth season.

Set in the 24th century, the series follows the adventures of the Starfleet crew of the Federation starship Enterprise-D. In this episode, after an accident leaves Worf paralysed, his only hope may be a visiting doctor with questionable medical ethics.

Guest star Caroline Kava plays Federation Doctor Russell who specializes in neuroscience and experimental medicine.

== Plot ==
In a storage bay, Worf is hit by a barrel that falls from above. His spine is damaged, resulting in paraplegia. Dr. Crusher, the commanding medical physician on the Enterprise, consults a neurological specialist, Dr. Toby Russell, to aid in the treatment and provide professional expertise for Worf's injury.

During the review of Worf's case regarding the injury Dr. Russell states that Klingon anatomy is "over designed" and that she has not "seen so many unnecessary redundancies in one body". Dr. Crusher informs Dr. Russell that Klingons refer to the redundancies as the "brak'lul" and that almost every vital function has two organs in case of failure. After further discussions, she introduces Dr. Crusher to a genetic tissue generator device, the "genatronic replicator" that she has been using in experimental holographic simulation applications for which the "early results have been very encouraging". Dr. Crusher is impressed and was unaware of its use on humanoids. Dr. Russell reports that it has never been used on humanoid species and makes a suggestion that this experimental application be used to clone Worf's spinal cord for transplantation. Dr. Crusher has significant concerns regarding the use of an experimental treatment as Worf would be the first patient to have its use as a humanoid species and that they know little about Klingon anatomy and physiology for successful surgical procedure. Dr. Crusher informs Dr. Russell that conventional techniques will be used.

Dr. Crusher speaks to Worf and recommends implants that transmit neural signals which would allow him to regain about 60% of his mobility. However, Worf does not like the idea of being an injured warrior "lurching through corridors", so he considers his life to be over.

Dr. Russell volunteers to assist in treating injured colonists whose transport had struck a mine. Crusher finds that she has used an experimental drug on a patient who subsequently died, and quietly but strongly reprimands Russell for not using proven methods first.

Worf asks Commander Riker to assist him in performing a ritual suicide. Riker emphatically tells Worf that he will not help a friend commit suicide. Riker brings the issue to Captain Picard. Captain Picard asks Riker to take into account that the Klingon customs and beliefs are different than humans'.

Riker points out that it is his son, Alexander, that the ritual states should assist. Unable to ask his son, Worf decides to risk undergoing the untested spine replacement procedure, against Dr. Crusher's advice.

The operation is performed with intermittent difficulties but ultimately results in a successful transplantation of the spinal cord. When Dr. Crusher orders the life support to be discontinued and have Worf awakened, his vital signs deteriorate and he proceeds to cardiac arrest and loss of "higher brain functions". They work to re-establish his vital signs with multiple medications, one of which prompts Dr. Russell to exclaim "that'll kill him" to which Dr. Crusher responds "looks like we've done a good job of that already, doctor". Worf doesn't respond to the medication. The surgical assistant ensign Ogawa says Worf has "no BP, no pulse, no activity in the isocortex". Dr. Crusher asks for a "corticostimulator", a mechanical device that is placed on Worf's forehead to send electrical signals through his brain to revive him. After five unsuccessful attempts, Dr. Crusher pronounces Worf dead, while he lies on the operating room table. A distraught Dr. Crusher informs Troi and Alexander of his death. Alexander demands to see his father and is allowed to. While Alexander is mourning his father's death, Worf begins to breathe and make facial movements. Dr. Crusher quickly orders vital sign monitoring and administers medication. She surmises that due to the Klingon anatomical redundancies, an area of the Klingon brain helped restart his body's functions.

Later, Dr. Russell enters Dr. Crusher's office, and Crusher tells her that while she is delighted that Worf will recover, she is horrified by Russell's immoral methods of putting her own interests in collecting research data and gaining recognition above patients' interests and lives. Russell silently leaves the room.

Back in his quarters, Worf begins physical therapy, and accepts help from Alexander in learning to walk once again.

== Overview ==
Writer Ronald D. Moore said that he hated working on this episode in the book Star Trek: The Next Generation 365. The episode story was done by Sara Charno and Stuart Charno. The teleplay was written by Ronald D. Moore.

The episode was directed by Chip Chalmers and featured guest stars Patti Yasutake, Brian Bonsall, and Caroline Kava. This episode was first broadcast in syndication the week of March 2, 1992. In the special effects scene for the experimental surgery, the character Worf is played by his photo-double Al Foster.

== Reception ==
Screen Rant contributor Derek Draven argued that "Ethics" is the show's fifth "Most Important Episode with a Moral Message," writing that "'Ethics' is a two-pronged social message. The first involves the morality of committing suicide in the face of a tremendous physical challenge, while the other focuses on the lengths someone will go to in order to prove a medical theory. It's both poignant and relevant."

In 2011, the A.V. Club gave this episode a B−.

== Releases ==
The episode was released in the United States on November 5, 2002, as part of the season five DVD box set. The first Blu-ray release was in the United States on November 18, 2013, followed by the United Kingdom the next day, November 19, 2013.

== See also ==
- "Nothing Human", the Star Trek: Voyager fifth-season episode that also deals with medical ethics.
