= List of Star Trek: Voyager cast members =

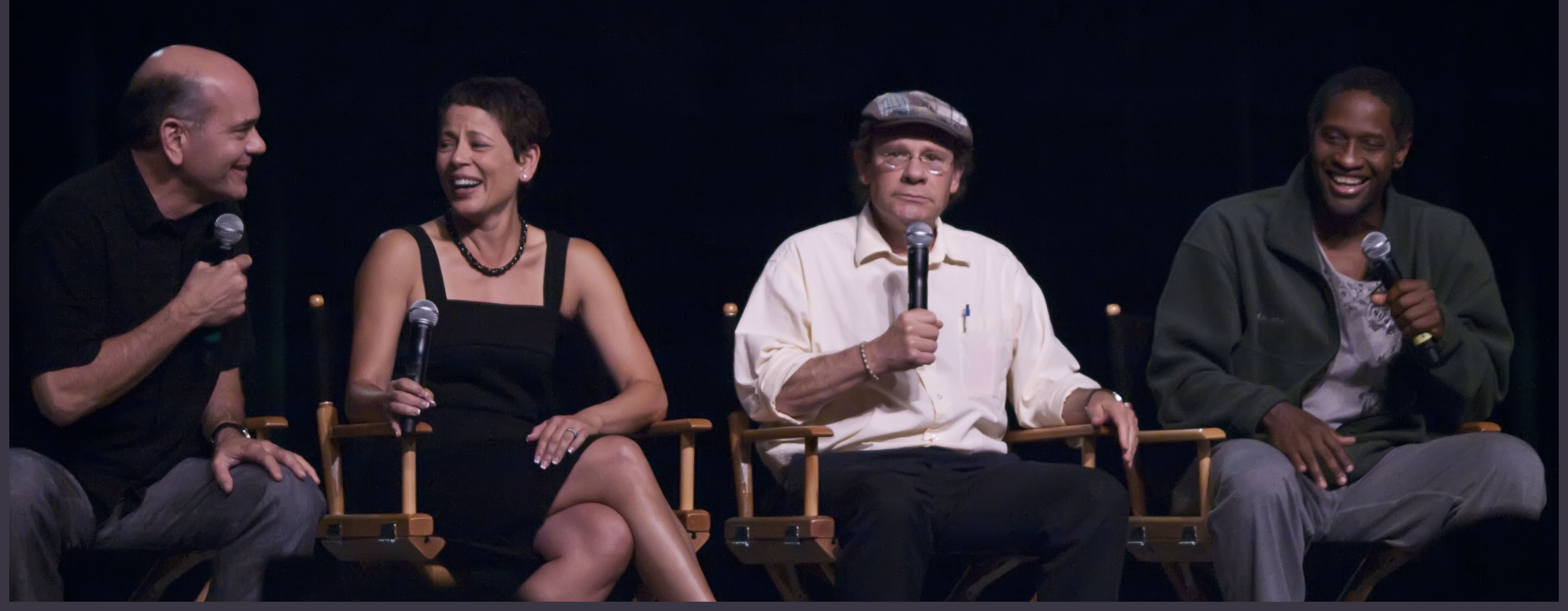
Robert Picardo, Roxann Dawson, Ethan Phillips, Tim Russ at a Voyager panel in 2009

Star Trek: Voyager is an American science fiction television series that debuted on UPN on January 16, 1995, and ran for seven seasons until May 23, 2001. The show was the fourth live-action series in the Star Trek franchise. This is a list of actors who have appeared on Star Trek: Voyager.

== Cast ==
=== Main cast ===
- Kate Mulgrew as Kathryn Janeway, commanding officer of the USS Voyager.
- Robert Beltran as Chakotay, Janeway's first officer and former member of the Maquis.
- Roxann Dawson as B'Elanna Torres, chief engineer and former member of the Maquis.
- Robert Duncan McNeill as Tom Paris, conn officer.
- Jennifer Lien as Kes, nurse and medical apprentice until her departure from Voyager in 2374.
- Ethan Phillips as Neelix, chef, morale officer, and later Federation Ambassador to the Delta Quadrant.
- Robert Picardo as The Doctor, chief medical officer.
- Tim Russ as Tuvok, chief security/tactical officer.
- Jeri Ryan as Seven of Nine, stellar cartography and former Borg drone liberated from the Collective.
- Garrett Wang as Harry Kim, operations officer.

=== Recurring cast ===
- Simon Billig as Hogan, engineering officer and former member of the Maquis until his death in 2373.
- Josh Clark as Joe Carey, engineering officer until his death in 2378.
- Anthony De Longis as Jal Culluh, First Maje of the Kazon-Nistrim.
- John de Lancie as Q, a member of the Q-Continuum who frequently visits the USS Voyager.
- Christine Delgado as Susan Nicoletti, engineering officer.
- Brad Dourif as Lon Suder, engineering officer and former member of the Maquis until his death in 2373.
- Susan Patterson as Kaplan, security officer until her death in 2373.
- Alexander Enberg as Vorik, engineering officer.
- Tarik Ergin as Ayala, security officer, conn officer, and former member of the Maquis.
- Martha Hackett as Seska, Cardassian operative and Kazon collaborator until her death in 2373.
- Richard Herd as Owen Paris, flag officer at Starfleet Command, officer of the Pathfinder Project, and father of Tom Paris.
- Nancy Hower as Samantha Wildman, science officer.
- Manu Intiraymi as Icheb, a former Borg drone liberated from the Collective.
- Marley S. McClean as Mezoti, a former Borg drone liberated from the Collective.
- Derek McGrath as Chell, operations officer and former member of the Maquis.
- Zoe McLellan as Tal Celes, operations officer.
- Scarlett Pomers as Naomi Wildman, daughter of Samantha Wildman.
- John Rhys-Davies as the holographic recreation of Leonardo da Vinci.
- Raphael Sbarge as Michael Jonas, engineering officer and former member of the Maquis until his death in 2372.
- Martin Rayner as Doctor Chaotica, a holodeck character.
- Dwight Schultz as Reginald Barclay, officer at Starfleet Communications and the Pathfinder Project.
- Marina Sirtis as Deanna Troi, ship's counselor on the USS Enterprise-E.
- John Tampoya as Kashimuro Nozawa, operations officer.
- Susanna Thompson as The Borg Queen, leader of the Borg Collective.
- Cody Wetherill as Rebi, a former Borg drone liberated from the Collective.
- Kurt Wetherill as Azan, a former Borg drone liberated from the Collective.

== Guest appearances ==
=== Cameos ===
- Prince Abdullah of Jordan (now king) played an unnamed ensign (science officer) in the episode "Investigations".
- Musician Tom Morello played Crewman Mitchell, seen when Captain Janeway asks him for directions on Deck 15, in "Good Shepherd".

=== Actors ===
Source material:

- Jason Alexander played Kurros, the spokesperson for a group of alien scholars, in "Think Tank".
- John Aniston played the Quarren Ambassador in the two-part episode "Workforce".
- Ed Begley Jr. portrayed Henry Starling, an unscrupulous 20th-century industrialist, in "Future's End" parts 1 and 2.
- Dan Butler played Steth in "Vis à Vis".
- Robert Curtis Brown portrayed Neezar, the Ledosian ambassador, in "Natural Law".
- David Clennon played Dr. Crell Moset in the episode "Nothing Human".
- Henry Darrow appears in the episodes "Tattoo" and "Basics: Part I" as Chakotay's father.
- Andy Dick plays the Emergency Medical Hologram Mark 2 on USS Prometheus in "Message in a Bottle".
- David Graf appeared as Fred Noonan, Amelia Earhart's navigator in the episode "The 37's".
- Gary Graham, who portrayed Ambassador Soval on Star Trek: Enterprise, played Ocampan community leader Tanis in the season-two episode "Cold Fire".
- Gerrit Graham played a member of the Q Continuum called Quinn in "Death Wish" who sought asylum on Voyager.
- Joel Grey played Caylem, in "Resistance".
- Lori Hallier played Riley Frazier, one of a group of former Borg drones, in "Unity".
- Dwayne "The Rock" Johnson portrayed the Pendari Champion with whom Seven of Nine and Tuvok are forced to compete in the episode "Tsunkatse".
- Leslie Jordan played Kol, a Ferengi, in the episode “False Profits”.
- Alice Krige and Susanna Thompson both played the Borg Queen. Krige, who had originated the role in the movie Star Trek: First Contact, returned for Voyager's series finale; Thompson had portrayed the character earlier in the show's run.
- Sharon Lawrence played the famous aviator Amelia Earhart in the episode "The 37's".
- Michael McKean plays a maniacal clown character in a simulation in which the crew's minds are held hostage in the episode "The Thaw".
- Virginia Madsen played Kellin, a Ramuran tracer, in "Unforgettable".
- Marjorie Monaghan played Freya, a shieldmaiden, in "Heroes and Demons".
- Leland Orser played Dejaren, an unstable hologram, in "Revulsion"
- John Savage plays Captain Rudolph Ransom of the USS Equinox, another Federation starship that Voyager encountered in the Delta Quadrant, in "Equinox" parts 1 and 2.
- Lori Petty played Noss in the episode "Gravity". Tuvok and Tom become stranded on a planet and befriend Noss, an alien stranded there many years before.
- John Rhys-Davies plays Leonardo da Vinci in Janeway's holodeck program. He appeared in "Scorpion: Part I" and "Concerning Flight".
- W. Morgan Sheppard appeared as Qatai, an alien trapped by a telepathic "pitcher plant" anomaly masquerading as Voyager's savior, in "Bliss".
- Sarah Silverman appeared as Rain Robinson, a young astronomer who finds Voyager in orbit of 20th-century Earth, in "Future's End" parts 1 and 2.
- Kurtwood Smith, who played the Federation president in Star Trek VI: The Undiscovered Country, played Annorax, a Krenim scientist who was determined to restore his original timeline, in "Year of Hell" parts 1 and 2.
- Comedian Scott Thompson played the alien Tomin in "Someone to Watch Over Me".
- Ray Walston, who appeared as Starfleet Academy groundskeeper Boothby in the Star Trek: The Next Generation episode "The First Duty", reprised the role in the episodes "In the Flesh" and "The Fight".
- Songwriter Paul Williams played Prelate Koru in "Virtuoso".
- Titus Welliver played Lieutenant Maxwell Burke in "Equinox" parts 1 and 2.
- Joseph Will played Tellis in "Muse".
- Ray Wise played Arturis in "Hope and Fear". He also had an appearance in an episode of Star Trek: The Next Generation called "Who Watches the Watchers".
- Tom Wright appeared as Tuvix in "Tuvix".

== Connections with other Star Trek incarnations ==
Fictional chronology
Year	TNG	DS9	VOY
2364	S1		
2365	S2		
2366	S3		
2367	S4		
2368	S5		
2369	S6	S1	
2370	S7	S2	
2371		S3	S1
2372		S4	S2
2373		S5	S3
2374		S6	S4
2375		S7	S5
2376			S6
2377			S7

=== Characters and races ===
As with other Star Trek series, the original Star Trek's Vulcans, Klingons, and Romulans appear in Star Trek: Voyager. Voyager had appearances by several other races who initially appear in The Next Generation: the Q, the Borg, Cardassians, Bajorans, Betazoids, and Ferengi, along with Deep Space Nine's Jem'Hadar (via hologram), as well as the Maquis resistance movement, previously established in episodes of The Next Generation and Deep Space Nine.

One notable connection between Voyager and The Next Generation appears regarding a wormhole and the Ferengi. In The Next Generation season-three episode "The Price", bidding takes place for rights to a wormhole. The Ferengi send a delegation to the bidding. When the Enterprise and Ferengi vessel each send shuttles into the wormhole, they appear in the Delta Quadrant, where the Ferengi shuttle becomes trapped. In the Voyager season-three episode "False Profits", the Ferengi who were trapped have since landed on a nearby planet, and begun exploiting the inhabitants for profit.

=== Actors from other Star Trek incarnations who appeared on Voyager ===
- Michael Ansara, who played the Klingon commander Kang on the original series ("Day of the Dove") and Deep Space Nine ("Blood Oath") also appeared as Kang on Voyager ("Flashback").
- Vaughn Armstrong, who portrayed a wide variety of guest characters throughout the show's run, later went on to portray Admiral Forrest in Star Trek: Enterprise.
- Majel Barrett voices the ship's computer, having performed the same role in previous Star Trek series.
- LeVar Burton, who played Geordi La Forge on The Next Generation, appeared as Captain LaForge of USS Challenger in an alternate future in the episode "Timeless".
- Jeffrey Combs (Weyoun and Brunt of Deep Space Nine and Shran of Enterprise) appeared in "Tsunkatse" as Norcadian Penk.
- Leonard Crofoot, who appeared in "Virtuoso" as a Qomar spectator, appeared in The Next Generation episodes "Angel One" and as the prototype version of Data's daughter Lal in "The Offspring".
- John de Lancie plays the mischievous Q, who also annoyed Captain Jean-Luc Picard on the Enterprise and Commander Benjamin Sisko on Deep Space Nine in the Deep Space Nine episode "Q-Less". He appeared in "Death Wish", "The Q and the Grey" and "Q2".
- Aron Eisenberg (Nog of Deep Space Nine) appeared in "Initiations" as a Kazon adolescent named Kar.
- Jonathan Frakes played Commander William Riker from The Next Generation, appearing in "Death Wish".
- Gerrit Graham, who played the Hunter in a Deep Space Nine episode called "Captive Pursuit", and later played a Q (Quinn) in the Voyager episode "Death Wish".
- J. G. Hertzler (Martok of Deep Space Nine and Klingon advocate Kolos in the Enterprise episode: "Judgement") appeared in "Tsunkatse" as an unnamed Hirogen.
- Suzie Plakson, who portrayed Dr. Selar in The Next Generation episode The Schizoid Man" as well as Ambassador K'Ehleyr, Worf's mate in "The Emissary" and "Reunion", appeared as the female Q in the episode "The Q and the Grey".
- Joseph Ruskin played a Vulcan Master in the episode "Gravity". Ruskin also played Galt in the Star Trek Original Series episode "Gamesters of Triskelion", the Klingon Tumek Deep Space Nine episodes "House of Quark" and "Looking for par'Mach in All the Wrong Places", a Cardassian informant in the Deep Space Nine episode "Improbable Cause", and a Suliban doctor in the Enterprise episode "Broken Bow".
- Dwight Schultz played Reginald Barclay on Star Trek: The Next Generation and in the film Star Trek: First Contact. He appeared in the following Voyager episodes: "Projections", "Pathfinder", "Life Line", "Inside Man", "Author, Author" and "Endgame".
- Mark Allen Shepherd also appeared uncredited as Morn, alongside Quark in the pilot.
- Armin Shimerman, who portrayed Quark on Deep Space Nine, appeared in the pilot "Caretaker".
- Dan Shor, who appeared as the Ferengi Dr. Arridor in The Next Generation episode "The Price", reprised the role in Voyager episode "False Profits", having become stranded in the Delta Quadrant at the end of the Next Generation episode.
- Marina Sirtis, as Counselor Deanna Troi from The Next Generation, appears in "Pathfinder", "Life Line", and "Inside Man".
- James Sloyan portrayed Alidar Jarok (a defecting Romulan admiral) in "The Defector" and Alexander Rozhenko (Worf's son) as an adult in the future in "Firstborn", both Star Trek: The Next Generation episodes. In Star Trek: Deep Space Nine, he portrayed the Bajoran scientist Mora Pol and Odo's "father" in the episodes "The Begotten" and "The Alternate". The Star Trek: Voyager episode entitled "Jetrel" featured Sloyan as the title character.
- Kurtwood Smith, who plays Annorax in "Year of Hell", appeared in Star Trek: Deep Space Nine episode "Things Past" as Thrax. Before this, he also appeared in Star Trek VI: The Undiscovered Country as the president of the Federation.
- George Takei from the Original Series reprised his role as Hikaru Sulu, who became Captain of USS Excelsior in Star Trek VI: The Undiscovered Country. He appeared in Voyager episode "Flashback", commemorating the 30th anniversary of Star Trek.
- Tony Todd, who played Worf's brother Kurn in The Next Generation episodes "Sins of the Father", "Redemption", parts 1 and 2 and the Deep Space Nine episode "Sons of Mogh", also the adult Jake Sisko in the Deep Space Nine episode "The Visitor", played an unnamed Hirogen in the Voyager episode "Prey".
- Gwynyth Walsh (B'Etor of The Next Generation and Generations) appeared in "Random Thoughts" as Chief Examiner Nimira.
- Grace Lee Whitney from Original Series reprised her role as Janice Rand in Voyager episode "Flashback", commemorating the 30th anniversary of Star Trek.

=== Actors from Voyager who appeared in other Star Trek incarnations ===
- Martha Hackett (Seska) appeared in deleted scenes from the finale of Star Trek: The Next Generation, "All Good Things...", and as Romulan Subcommander T'Rul in the Star Trek: Deep Space Nine two-part episode "The Search".
- Robert Duncan McNeill (Paris) appeared in the Star Trek: The Next Generation episode "The First Duty" as Cadet Nicolas Locarno. The character of Locarno was used as a template for Tom Paris. He also appeared as Tom Paris in the Star Trek: Lower Decks episode "We'll Always Have Tom Paris".
- Kate Mulgrew appeared again as Kathryn Janeway, now promoted to vice admiral, in Star Trek: Nemesis. Mulgrew also voiced Admiral Janeway and a training hologram based on Janeway in the animated series Star Trek: Prodigy.
- Ethan Phillips (Neelix) was featured in the Star Trek: The Next Generation episode "Ménage à Troi" as Farek, the Star Trek: Enterprise episode "Acquisition" as Ulis, and in Star Trek: First Contact as the maître d' in the Dixon Hill holodeck program. He voiced a docent for the decommissioned USS Voyager in the Star Trek: Lower Decks episode "Twovix" in season 4.
- Robert Picardo (The Doctor) appeared in the Star Trek: Deep Space Nine episode "Doctor Bashir, I Presume" as Dr. Lewis Zimmerman and an EMH Mark I, and made a cameo appearance in the film Star Trek: First Contact as the EMH aboard the Enterprise-E.
- Tim Russ (Tuvok) appeared in the Star Trek: The Next Generation episode "Starship Mine", the Star Trek: Deep Space Nine episodes "Invasive Procedures" and "Through the Looking Glass" (in the latter as a mirror version of Tuvok), and Star Trek: Generations. He appeared first as a Changeling impersonating Tuvok and then as the real Tuvok in the episodes "Surrender" and "The Last Generation" of Star Trek: Picard respectively.
- Jeri Ryan appeared as Seven of Nine as a regular cast member in Star Trek: Picard.
- Robert Beltran appeared as Captain Chakotay of the USS Protostar in Star Trek: Prodigy.

== Appearances ==
= Main cast (credited)
= Recurring cast (4+)
= Guest cast (1-3)

Actor	Character	Seasons						
Actor	Character	1	2	3	4	5	6	7
Main cast
Kate Mulgrew	Kathryn Janeway	Main	Main	Main	Main	Main	Main	Main
Robert Beltran	Chakotay	Main	Main	Main	Main	Main	Main	Main
Roxann Dawson	B'Elanna Torres	Main	Main	Main	Main	Main	Main	Main
Robert Duncan McNeill	Tom Paris	Main	Main	Main	Main	Main	Main	Main
Jennifer Lien	Kes	Main (Note: Lien is still credited as "Also Starring" following the opening credits in episodes 4.01, 4.02 and 6.23, instead of in the opening credits.)	Main	Main	Main		Main	
Ethan Phillips	Neelix	Main	Main	Main	Main	Main	Main	Main
Robert Picardo	The Doctor	Main	Main	Main	Main	Main	Main	Main
Tim Russ	Tuvok	Main	Main	Main	Main	Main	Main	Main
Garrett Wang	Harry Kim	Main	Main	Main	Main	Main	Main	Main
Jeri Ryan	Seven of Nine				Main	Main	Main	Main
Recurring cast
Josh Clark	Joe Carey	Recurring				Guest	Guest	Guest
Anthony De Longis	Jal Culluh	Guest	Recurring	Guest				
Martha Hackett	Seska	Recurring	Recurring	Guest				Guest
Derek McGrath	Chell	Guest						Guest
Simon Billig	Hogan		Recurring	Guest				
John de Lancie	Q		Guest	Guest				Guest
Brad Dourif	Lon Suder		Guest	Guest				
Richard Herd (Note: The character was played by Warren Munson in Seasons 2 and 5.)	Owen Paris		Guest			Guest	Guest	Guest
Nancy Hower	Samantha Wildman		Recurring	Guest	Guest	Guest	Guest	
Scarlett Pomers (Note: The character was played by uncredited babies in Seasons 2 and 3 and by Brooke Stephens in season 4.)	Naomi Wildman		Guest	Guest	Guest	Recurring	Recurring	Guest
Raphael Sbarge	Michael Jonas		Recurring					
Dwight Schultz	Reginald Barclay		Guest				Guest	Recurring
Susan Patterson	Kaplan			Recurring				
Alexander Enberg	Vorik			Guest	Guest	Guest		Guest
John Rhys-Davies	Leonardo da Vinci			Guest	Guest			
Martin Rayner	Doctor Chaotica					Guest		Guest
Susanna Thompson (Note: In the series finale, the character was played by Alice Krige.)	Borg Queen					Guest	Guest	Guest
Manu Intiraymi	Icheb						Recurring	Recurring
Marley S. McClean	Mezoti						Recurring	Guest
Zoe McLellan	Tal Celes						Guest	
Marina Sirtis	Deanna Troi						Guest	Guest
Cody Wetherill	Rebi						Recurring	Guest
Kurt Wetherill	Azan						Recurring	Guest

== See also ==
- List of Star Trek: The Original Series cast members
- List of Star Trek: The Next Generation cast members
- List of Star Trek: Deep Space Nine cast members
- List of Star Trek: Enterprise cast members
- List of Star Trek: Discovery characters
