= Exposure (American TV series) =

- Genre: Science fiction
- Country of origin: United States
- Original language: English

Original release
- Network: Sci-Fi Channel
- Release: 5 April 2000 – 2002

Exposure is a short-film oriented science-fiction anthology television series that aired on the Sci-Fi Channel between the years of 2000 and 2002. The series showcased the short sci-fi films of both unknown and known (Tim Burton, George Lucas, and Kevin Smith) filmmakers, giving rise to the channel's own Exposure Studios. Hosted by actress Lisa Marie, the films presented a wide range of science fiction subject matter. The series received poor ratings and was canceled in the fall of 2002. The series was originally shown on Sundays at 10:00pm EST and was repeated the following Saturday at 2:00am EST, later on the time was changed to 11:00pm EST and still repeated the following Saturday well after Midnight, which probably is a major reason for the poor ratings this show received. The series also had two guest hosts. Terry Farrell would host the "Best of Season One" episode and director Kevin Smith hosted the "Star Wars Short Films Showcase".

The Sci-Fi Channel had also struck a deal with Atom Films giving them the broadcast rights for 'Atom Films' new science-fiction acquisitions, as well as all science fiction films currently in their library for Exposure.

== Notable films aired ==
Some of the rare films that were aired on the series include Tim Burton's Disney short film of Frankenweenie (which Disney decided not to release deeming it too scary for children) and Lucas' original student film Electronic Labyrinth: THX 1138 4EB which was a basis for his 1971 cult sci-fi film THX 1138. Other notable works that were aired include The Forbidden by Clive Barker, Groping by Alex Proyas, More by Mark Osborne, George Lucas in Love by Joseph Nussbaum, Battle of the Sexes by Eric Kripke, Season's Greetings by Michael Dougherty, Silent Number by Jamie Blanks, To Build a Better Mousetrap by Christopher Leone, Suspicious by David Koepp, Oink by Rand Ravich, Tripping the Rift by Chris Moeller, Antebios by François Baranger, Herd by Mike Mitchell, and Evil Hill by Ryan Schifrin.

Redshirt Blues aired in an episode broadcast September 16, 2001.

== Exposure Studios ==
This offshoot of the "Exposure" program was created by the Sci Fi Channel to serve as a springboard for promising amateur and semi-professional filmmakers. Exposure Studios was focused primarily on funding, mentoring and promoting young directors, commissioning them to create mini television pilots. Among the short films it produced were: The Man with No Eyes, Dream Hackers, Area 52, and Grasp. Wes Craven served as a mentor on the project.

== Legacy ==
Although it appears that there are no plans to bring Exposure back on the Sci-Fi Channel lineup the channel sponsored a short film showcase called "Exposure: Future of Film Festival" in New York City in August 2000. Although this has not happened since, the Sci-Fi channel still fosters a love of short film and has cashiered the works of interested filmmakers under the Exposure brand. In late October 2006 the Sci-Fi Channel in partnership with the Sundance Channel launched the Exposure Film Contest which ran for 8 weeks. The films were showcased on the SciFi Pulse broadband streaming applet of SciFi.com and viewers were permitted to vote on their favorites each week. The favorites of each week would then go on to the final choice selection with a results being posted on a primetime special that aired May 23, 2007. The winner was Paradox Road by Robert J. Thissen. Whether this contest will be repeated next year is unknown at this time.

The series has received a following in the science fiction/media fandom community. Many have complained about the late night Sunday slot in which the show was aired and asked the network to air it much earlier in the evening. Apparently SFC management failed to hear the viewers concerns.

== See also ==
- Cartoon Network Shorts Department
- Cartoon Sushi
- The Cartoonstitute
- Disney XD Shortstop
- Eye Drops
- Go! Cartoons
- KaBlam!
- Liquid Television
- Love, Death & Robots
- Nickelodeon Animated Shorts Program
- Nicktoons Film Festival
- Off the Air
- Oh Yeah! Cartoons
- Random! Cartoons
- Raw Toonage
- Short Circutz
- Shorty McShorts' Shorts
- Spike and Mike's Festival of Animation
- Too Cool! Cartoons
- TripTank
- VH1 ILL-ustrated
- Wedgies
- What a Cartoon!
