= Thirty Days (Star Trek: Voyager) =

- Star Trek: Voyager episode
- Episode no.: Season 5 Episode 9
- Directed by: Winrich Kolbe
- Story by: Scott Smith Miller
- Teleplay by: Kenneth Biller
- Production code: 202
- Original air date: December 9, 1998

Guest appearances
- Willie Garson - Riga; Benjamin Livingston - Burkus; Alissa Kramer - Jenny Delaney; Heidi Kramer - Megan Delaney; Warren Munson - Admiral Paris; David Keith Anderson - Ens. Ashmore

Episode chronology
← Previous "Nothing Human"	Next → "Counterpoint"
- Star Trek: Voyager season 5

"Thirty Days" is the 103rd episode of the science fiction television series Star Trek: Voyager, the ninth episode of the fifth season. The series, set in the late 24th century, follows a Federation starship crewed by both Starfleet officers and rebellious members of the Maquis stuck on the other side of the Galaxy.

In this episode, Voyager's pilot Tom Paris is not only demoted to the rank of Ensign, but is also confined to the ship's brig for thirty days and uses his time to record the story of how he ended up there.

== Plot ==
Lieutenant Tom Paris is demoted to Ensign and placed in Voyager's brig for thirty days for disobeying orders. Paris relates the events to his personal log as a message to his father.

In flashback, Voyager meets with the non-native delegates of an ocean planet. The delegates, including Riga and Burkus, explain that the planet is losing water mass at an alarming rate, threatening to destroy the planet in 5 years if it is not stopped. Though they have some submarine vehicles, they are unable to reach the center of the planet where they believe the source of their problems can be found. The Voyager crew offers the use of the Delta Flyer, capable of withstanding the pressures at the planet's center. Paris, piloting the excursion with some of the planet's scientists including Riga, discover that the planet's core is a massive reactor, drawing the surface water of a nearby planet to it for unknown reasons. Further exploration reveals that oxygen-mining reactors used by the current population are the cause of the water loss.

The Voyager crew offer several technological options to minimize the water loss, but Burkus seems impassive about them. Even when Riga suggests turning off several of the oxygen-mining units, significantly prolonging the planet's existence but potentially decreasing the quality of life for the inhabitants, Burkus simply offers to pass these ideas to their government. The crew is eventually told that the government will not turn off the oxygen-mining facilities but politely thanks them for their assistance.

Urged on by Riga, Paris attempts to convince Captain Janeway to change the minds of the inhabitants, but Janeway refuses, citing that Voyager cannot get involved due to the Prime Directive. Furious at the decision, and goaded by B'Elanna Torres, who asks Paris, "What would Tom Paris do?", Paris and Riga steal the Delta Flyer, and attempt to use a photon torpedo to destroy one of the oxygen-mining facilities, but Voyager destroys the torpedo at the last minute with a depth charge and recovers the Delta Flyer. On return to Voyager, Janeway demotes Paris to the rank of ensign for disobeying orders and orders him to the brig for thirty days.

After the flashback ends, Tuvok goes to the brig, tells Paris that his thirty days have been served, and orders him to clean up and report for duty. In his quarters, Paris ends the message and sends it to his father.

== Development ==
The episode's original title was "Down Deep".

The original shoot of this episode was wholly the scenes of Tom Paris' adventure on the planet. When test screened the episode lacked the mandatory time length and so the brig scenes of the episode were formulated by Robert Beltran (Commander Chakotay) and added.

== Releases ==
On November 9, 2004, this episode was released as part of the season 5 DVD box set of Star Trek: Voyager. The box set includes 7 DVD optical discs with all the episodes in season 5 with some extra features, and episodes have a Dolby 5.1 Digital Audio track.

On April 25, 2001, this episode was released on LaserDisc in Japan, as part of the half-season collection, 5th Season vol.1 . This included episodes from "Night" to "Bliss" on seven double sided 12 inch optical discs, with English and Japanese audio tracks for the episodes.
