= Once Upon a Time (Star Trek: Voyager) =

- Star Trek: Voyager episode
- Episode no.: Season 5 Episode 5
- Directed by: John T. Kretchmer
- Written by: Michael Taylor
- Production code: 199
- Original air date: November 11, 1998

Guest appearances
- Justin Louis - Trevis; Nancy Hower - Ens. Samantha Wildman; Scarlett Pomers - Naomi Wildman; Wallace Langham - Flotter

Episode chronology
← Previous "In the Flesh"	Next → "Timeless"
- Star Trek: Voyager season 5

"Once Upon a Time" is the 99th episode of the science fiction television series Star Trek: Voyager, the fifth episode of the fifth season.

Neelix tries to protect Naomi Wildman from the knowledge that her mother is in danger and may be lost on a mission.

This episode is noted for featuring the holodeck, and a story about Neelix.

It was written by Michael Taylor and directed by John T. Kretchmer, and aired on UPN on November 11, 1998.

== Plot ==
Due to an ion storm, the Delta Flyer crashes on a planetoid becoming buried under three kilometers of rock. Ensign Samantha Wildman is seriously injured, and Lieutenant Tom Paris and Lieutenant Commander Tuvok attend to her as they wait for Voyager to locate and rescue them. The ship's attempts are hampered due to more storms.

Meanwhile, on board Voyager, Wildman's young daughter Naomi awaits her mother's return. The crew is unsure of how to explain to her that her mother is lost, and dreads the possibility that Sam may have died. The ship's morale officer, Neelix, takes it on himself to spend time with his little god-daughter as they wait for news. He distracts her with the popular children's fairy holo-tale The Adventures of Flotter. Later Naomi learns more about the incident by accident. Neelix finds her in the Flotter program and tells the tale of how he lost his own family.

With only minutes to spare, the crew finds the Delta Flyer and beams everyone to safety. Samantha Wildman survives her injuries, and, once sufficiently recovered, enjoys the holo-tale along with Naomi and Neelix.

== Reception ==
Den of Geek included this episode on a binge watching guide that included a roadmap of episodes, that although not typically achieving high ratings, might still be entertaining.

In 2020, ScreenRant ranked this episode as one of the top ten worst episodes of Star Trek: Voyager.

In 2021, Tor.com gave it 8 out 10, remarking, "it works because it’s mostly there as a vehicle for dealing with issues of loss and parental responsibility" and was good introduction to Naomi Wildman (played by Pomers).

== Releases ==
On November 9, 2004, this episode was released as part of the season 5 DVD box set of Star Trek: Voyager. The box set includes 7 DVD optical discs with all the episodes in season 5 with some extra features, and episodes have a Dolby 5.1 Digital Audio track.

On April 25, 2001, this episode was released on LaserDisc in Japan, as part of the half-season collection, 5th Season vol.1 . This included episodes from "Night" to "Bliss" on seven double sided 12 inch optical discs, with English and Japanese audio tracks for the episodes.
