= Star Trek canon =

The Star Trek canon is the set of all material taking place within the Star Trek universe that is considered official. The definition and scope of the Star Trek canon has changed over time. Until late 2006, it was mainly composed of the live-action television series and films before becoming a more vague and abstract concept. From 2010 until 2023, the official Star Trek website's site map described their database, which listed both animated and live-action series and films as its sources, as "The Official Star Trek Canon".

Although Roddenberry exerted almost total creative control over the first seasons of Star Trek, he preemptively rebuked any notion that he would be the final authority. He had hoped that Star Trek would go on after his death. As Star Trek was constantly improved by each following generation, he expected people to look back upon its humble beginnings as just that, the simple beginnings of something much bigger and better.

== Television series and films ==
Generally, all live-action Star Trek television series and films have been considered part of the canon, up to the point of contradiction or material the creators consider bad. Star Trek: Lower Decks and Star Trek: Prodigy are accepted as canonical as well. Until 2010, everything outside of the live-action television episodes and films were "traditionally" considered non-canonical, including Star Trek: The Animated Series. However, large portions of the fan base, as well as Star Trek affiliates, supported The Animated Series being adopted as fully canonical. With the relaunch of StarTrek.com in 2010, The Animated Series was added to the list of canonical shows included in the database, thus officially confirming the show's new status as part of the Star Trek canon.

Gene Roddenberry was something of a revisionist when it came to the canon. People who worked with Roddenberry have remembered that he used to handle canonicity on a point-by-point basis rather than series-by-series or episode-by-episode. If he changed his mind on something, or if a fact in one episode contradicted what he considered to be a more important fact in another episode, he had no problem declaring that specific fact not canonical.

See, people can easily catch us, and say "well, wait a minute, in 'Balance of Terror', they knew that the Romulans had a cloaking device, and then in 'The Enterprise Incident', they don't know anything about cloaking devices, but they're gonna steal this one because it's obviously just been developed, so how the hell do you explain that?" We can't. There are some things we just can't explain, especially when it comes from the third season. So, yes, third season is canon [sic] up to the point of contradiction, or where it's just so bad ... you know, we kind of cringe when people ask us, "well, what happened in 'Plato's Stepchildren', and 'And the Children Shall Lead', and 'Spock's Brain', and so on—it's like, please, he wasn't even producing it at that point. But, generally, [the canon is] the original series, not really the animated, the first movie to a certain extent, the rest of the films in certain aspects but not in all ... I know that it's very difficult to understand. It literally is point by point. I sometimes do not know how he's going to answer a question when I go into his office, I really do not always know, and—and I know it better probably than anybody, what it is that Gene likes and doesn't like.

— Richard Arnold, archivist, 1991

Arguments about "canon" are silly. I always felt that Star Trek Animated was part of Star Trek because Gene Roddenberry accepted the paycheck for it and put his name on the credits. And D. C. Fontana – and all the other writers involved – busted their butts to make it the best Star Trek they could. But this whole business of "canon" really originated with Gene's errand boy. Gene liked giving people titles instead of raises, so the errand boy got named "archivist" and apparently it went to his head. Gene handed him the responsibility of answering all fan questions, silly or otherwise, and he apparently let that go to his head.

— David Gerrold, writer, 2014

Another thing that makes canon a little confusing. Gene R. himself had a habit of decanonizing things. He didn't like the way the animated series turned out, so he proclaimed that it was not canon. He also didn't like a lot of the movies. So he didn't much consider them canon either. And – okay, I'm really going to scare you with this one – after he got TNG [Star Trek: The Next Generation] going, he ... well ... he sort of decided that some of The Original Series wasn't canon either. I had a discussion with him once, where I cited a couple things that were very clearly canon in The Original Series, and he told me he didn't think that way anymore, and that he now thought of TNG as canon wherever there was conflict between the two. He admitted it was revisionist thinking, but so be it.

— Paula Block, editor, 2005

No definitive list exists of which films in particular Roddenberry disliked, or what elements in them he did not consider canonical. For example, the reference book Star Trek Chronology states that Roddenberry considered elements of Star Trek V and Star Trek VI to be apocryphal, but it does not specify to which particular elements in the films Roddenberry objected.

== Other licensed works ==
In general, Star Trek novels are not considered part of the canon. This was a guideline set early on by Gene Roddenberry, and repeated many times by people who worked with him:

And as long as Gene Roddenberry is involved in it, he is the final word on what is Star Trek. So, for us here – Ron Moore, Jeri Taylor, everybody who works on the show – Gene is the authority. And when he says that the books, and the games, and the comics and everything else, are not gospel, but are only additional Star Trek based on his Star Trek but not part of the actual Star Trek universe that he created ... they're just, you know, kinda fun to keep you occupied between episodes and between movies, whatever ... but he does not want that to be considered to be sources of information for writers, working on this show, he doesn't want it to be considered part of the canon by anybody working on any other projects.

— Richard Arnold, 1991

However, this rule is not without rare exceptions. Two Voyager novels written by Jeri Taylor (co-creator and then producer of Voyager), Mosaic and Pathways, were meant to be canonical, to be used as reference materials for use by Voyager's writers. However, as some of the background information mentioned in those books was never referenced in an episode of Voyager, or was contradicted in episodes written after they were published, their status within the canon is still open to debate.

The 2025 nine-episode audio drama series, Star Trek: Khan is considered, by the project's writers, to be part of the larger Star Trek canon.

There are also conflicting messages concerning "non-fiction" reference books such as The Star Trek Encyclopedia, Star Trek Chronology, Star Trek: The Next Generation Technical Manual, and Star Trek: Deep Space Nine Technical Manual. Unlike the novels and novelizations, these reference manuals have never been explicitly named as non-canonical, and the fact that they were officially sanctioned by Paramount and given to episode writers as guides serves to give them an aura of credibility. Roddenberry himself considered it part of the "background" of Star Trek. Similarly, Michael Okuda and Rick Sternbach, artists and technical consultants since Star Trek: The Next Generation and the authors of several of these reference books, considered their work "pretty official". However, they stop short of naming the books canonical, leaving the debate open. Star Trek writer and co-producer Ronald D. Moore dismissed such material, saying that, although the writing staff would often consult reference materials, they did not consider them canonical, reserving that title for the episodes and films. However, in a series of posts to the official Star Trek website's forums, Viacom Senior Director Harry Lang established his opinion that the reference books are canonical, saying "Only the reference books (tech manual, encyclopedia, etc ...) and two books by Jeri Taylor are considered canon outside the tv show and movies."

The novelizations of episodes and movies are not considered canonical. This is a tradition that also goes back to Roddenberry himself. His novelization of Star Trek: The Motion Picture includes many tangents and new information. It reveals, for instance, that the woman who dies in the transporter accident was Kirk's former spouse. While this novel filled in many gaps left in the movie, it has been said that Roddenberry himself thought it should not be considered canonical:

The novelization that Gene wrote himself, of Star Trek: the Motion Picture, he does not consider canon either, because he also went off on tangents, that he said that it's okay for individual writers to do that, and he certainly had some fun with it himself, filling in parts of the puzzle that he never would've been able to do on film, it would've been a ten-hour movie, but he doesn't want even that used for canon, because otherwise, where do you draw the line? Which books are accepted and which aren't?

— Richard Arnold, 1991

Star Trek comic books and magazines are generally not considered part of the canon. Regarding IDW Publishing's comic book tie-ins to the 2009 film and its sequel, screenwriter Roberto Orci felt that the background information conveyed in those books could be considered canonically accurate. Using rules similar to the ones that governed the Star Wars canon at the time, he acknowledged that the extended universe material he oversees could remain part of the accepted canon unless contradicted by future films or television series.

Nothing that takes place in Star Trek games, the Star Trek: The Experience attraction, or any other licensed material is considered canonical, nor are any unlicensed works such as Star Trek fan productions.

== See also ==
- Timeline of Star Trek
- Outline of Star Trek
