= Timeless (Star Trek: Voyager) =

- Star Trek: Voyager episode
- Episode no.: Season 5 Episode 6
- Directed by: LeVar Burton
- Story by: Rick Berman; Brannon Braga; Joe Menosky
- Teleplay by: Brannon Braga; Joe Menosky
- Production code: 201
- Original air date: November 18, 1998

Guest appearances
- LeVar Burton - Captain Geordi La Forge; Christine Harnos - Tessa Omond

Episode chronology
← Previous "Once Upon a Time"	Next → "Infinite Regress"
- Star Trek: Voyager season 5

"Timeless" is the sixth episode of the fifth season of Star Trek: Voyager and was also the series' 100th episode.

The episode was directed by LeVar Burton, who was also featured in a cameo appearance as his Star Trek: The Next Generation character Geordi La Forge.

The episode also marks an important turning point in the series when Janeway notes in her personal log the changing perspective of their journey home: it's no longer "if" the crew will ever return to Earth, but "when." The episode begins with a "cold opening" on an icy windswept planet. Two figures wearing survival gear beam onto the scene and search until they discover what they are looking for: Voyager, buried beneath the ice.

"Timeless" was the 100th episode of Star Trek: Voyager to be broadcast, which is a number noteworthy in television as it is the threshold for syndication viability.

== Plot ==
Fifteen years in the future, Chakotay and Harry Kim discover Voyager frozen on the surface of an ice world. They recover the body of Seven of Nine, collect the Doctor via his mobile emitter, and return to the Delta Flyer, joining Chakotay's girlfriend Tessa Omond (Christine Harnos). Kim explains to the Doctor that fifteen years prior, the crew had attempted to use slipstream engine technology to bring Voyager home, with Chakotay and Kim in the Delta Flyer leading the larger ship. However, the slipstream became unstable, causing Voyager to crash into the ice world. Chakotay and Kim have spent the last fifteen years searching for the ship. Kim explains that he can send a message back in time to Seven using a stolen Borg temporal transmitter, which would then prevent the accident.

As the Doctor and Kim work, they are pursued by USS Challenger, commanded by Captain Geordi La Forge. La Forge warns them that he knows they are trying to alter the past, a violation of the Temporal Prime Directive and although he's sympathetic to them, La Forge must stop their efforts. Chakotay offers Tessa the opportunity to be safely transported to the Challenger but she refuses.

The Doctor successfully discovers the correct Borg time index, and Kim sends the information, but this ultimately has no effect on the slipstream, and Voyager is still lost. Kim realizes the changes have not worked and blames himself for destroying Voyager twice. The Doctor convinces him to try again, but with a less optimal solution: to have the changes collapse the slipstream, keeping Voyager stranded in the Delta Quadrant but with all hands alive. As the Challenger opens fire on the Delta Flyer, an overload starts to build in the warp matrix. Kim successfully sends out the signal before the Delta Flyer's warp core breaches.

In the present, Voyager once again enters the slipstream, losing communications with the Delta Flyer. Seven receives the new calculations, and Janeway orders her to implement them. As planned, this causes the slipstream to fail, leaving Voyager and its crew safely in normal space, unharmed, and nearly ten years closer to home. Janeway orders the crew to dismantle the slipstream technology, believing it not yet ready for safe usage. She later provides Kim with an encoded message found in the signal telemetry: a recording that the future Kim had sent to his past self, giving him much-needed confidence in his abilities.

== Notes ==
In a future episode, "Relativity," Starfleet officers from the 29th century, dedicated to protecting the flow of time, are said to have been left to clean up the "mess" caused by future Harry's message to his past self; they refer to it as "the temporal inversion in the Takara sector."

Garrett Wang said: "Brannon Braga told me that 'Timeless' was to serve as Voyager's 'City on the Edge of Forever'."

Captain LaForge is wearing the grey-shoulder uniform from the last three TNG movies and the later seasons of Star Trek: Deep Space Nine, but with the future combadge from "All Good Things" and "The Visitor" in place of the 2370s combadge.

== Reception ==
In 2013, IGN ranked "Timeless" the 25th best episode of all Star Trek television, calling it a "compelling struggle" centered on Harry Kim and with a cameo by Geordi La Forge.

In 2014, Charlie Jane Anders at io9 ranked "Timeless" as the 93rd best episode of Star Trek in their list of the top 100 Star Trek episodes.

In 2016, The Hollywood Reporter rated "Timeless" the tenth best Star Trek: Voyager episode. The episode was also ranked as one of the top 10 episodes of Star Trek: Voyager in 2018 by ThoughtCo. (There were 172 episodes between 1995 and 2001.)

The appearance of a Galaxy-class (e.g. like the Enterprise D of Star Trek: The Next Generation), called the USS Challenger and commanded by Geordi was noted for a special effects sequence. LeVar Burton reprising his character Geordi La Forge from Star Trek: The Next Generation was noted by Wired in 2015, in their binge-watching guide for Star Trek: Voyager.

Den of Geek rated "Timeless" the third best episode of Star Trek: Voyager in 2012, and in 2015, suggested "Timeless" for a binge-watching guide that focused on Star Trek: Voyager episodes featuring time travel.

One SyFy reviewer ranked "Timeless" as the 13th best time travel plot in Star Trek in 2016. A 2020 SyFy review ranked it as the second-best episode of the Star Trek: Voyager series, praising it as a highly entertaining episode and "one of the greatest ever produced on any Star Trek series".

In 2017, Vulture listed this episode as one of the best of Star Trek: Voyager.

In 2018, CBR ranked this one of the top twenty time travel themed episodes of all Star Trek series.

In July 2019, a reviewer for Screen Rant ranked "Timeless" as one of the top five episodes of the series, describing Burton's cameo as "heartbreaking and uplifting" and adding that it explored Harry Kim's survivor guilt. They also praised the episode's special effects and overall story.

In 2020, Screen Rant said this was the sixth best episode of Star Trek: Voyager, based on an IMDb rating of 8.8 out of ten. In 2021, they also said this is one of the best episodes for Harry Kim.

== Releases ==
On November 9, 2004, this episode was released as part of the season 5 DVD box set of Star Trek: Voyager. The box set includes 7 DVD optical discs with all the episodes in season 5 with some extra features, and episodes have a Dolby 5.1 Digital Audio track.

On April 25, 2001, this episode was released on LaserDisc in Japan, as part of the half-season collection, 5th Season vol.1 . This included episodes from "Night" to "Bliss" on seven double sided 12 inch optical discs, with English and Japanese audio tracks for the episodes.

== See also ==
- Non Sequitur (Star Trek: Voyager) (Harry experiences an alternate reality in this episode)
