= Nothing Human =

- Star Trek: Voyager episode
- Episode no.: Season 5 Episode 8
- Directed by: David Livingston
- Written by: Jeri Taylor
- Production code: 200
- Original air date: December 2, 1998

Guest appearances
- David Clennon - Crell Moset; Jad Mager - Ens. Tabor; Frank Welker - The Alien Creature (voice)

Episode chronology
← Previous "Infinite Regress"	Next → "Thirty Days"
- Star Trek: Voyager season 5

"Nothing Human" is the 102nd episode of Star Trek: Voyager, the eighth episode of the fifth season. It was the final episode written by series co-creator Jeri Taylor.

== Plot ==
Voyager encounters a distress call and finds a ship with a non-humanoid life form on the verge of dying. They transport the scorpion-like creature to Sickbay but it wraps around B'Elanna Torres, creating a physical and biochemical bond. Doing nothing means Torres will die; separating them risks killing them both. The Doctor programs the holodeck to recreate the brilliant Cardassian exobiologist Crell Moset to help.

A Bajoran ensign reveals that Moset made advances in medical research by experimenting on Bajorans during the Cardassian occupation of Bajor. Torres, a former Maquis member, refuses to accept any procedure developed by the Cardassian hologram. Moset discovers a procedure to separate the creature from Torres without harming either; in order to save Torres, Captain Janeway orders the Doctor to proceed despite her wishes.

The Doctor and Moset begin the operation in the holodeck. A ship carrying other scorpion-like aliens arrives and holds Voyager with a tractor beam. The holodeck loses power, putting the operation at risk. Janeway insists on a peaceful solution and refuses to counter attack. First Officer Chakotay reroutes power to the holodeck, allowing the Doctor and Moset to complete the operation. Janeway has the creature transported back aboard the new ship; the ship leaves.

Torres is furious at Janeway for overriding her wishes. The Doctor faces a moral dilemma regarding the Moset program. Moset argues that although his medical knowledge was obtained unethically, it could benefit humanity; furthermore, since the Doctor has already used the unethically obtained knowledge to save someone, the Doctor is no better than he. The Doctor cannot in good conscience continue using the Moset program and its knowledge, and orders it deleted from the computer.

== Reception ==
CBR rated "Nothing Human" the 18th best holodeck episode of the franchise, noting the ethical questions raised in the episode.

== Releases ==
This episode was released on VHS, paired with "Infinite Regress".

On April 25, 2001, this episode was released on LaserDisc in Japan, as part of the half-season collection, 5th Season vol.1 . This included episodes from "Night" to "Bliss" on seven double sided 12 inch optical discs, with English and Japanese audio tracks for the episodes.

On November 9, 2004, this episode was released as part of the season 5 DVD box set of Star Trek: Voyager. The box set includes 7 DVD optical discs with all the episodes in season 5 with some extra features, and episodes have a Dolby 5.1 Digital Audio track.

== See also ==
- "Ethics," the fifth season Star Trek: The Next Generation episode that also deals with medical ethics.
- Artificial intelligence in healthcare
