= List of Star Trek: Enterprise cast members =

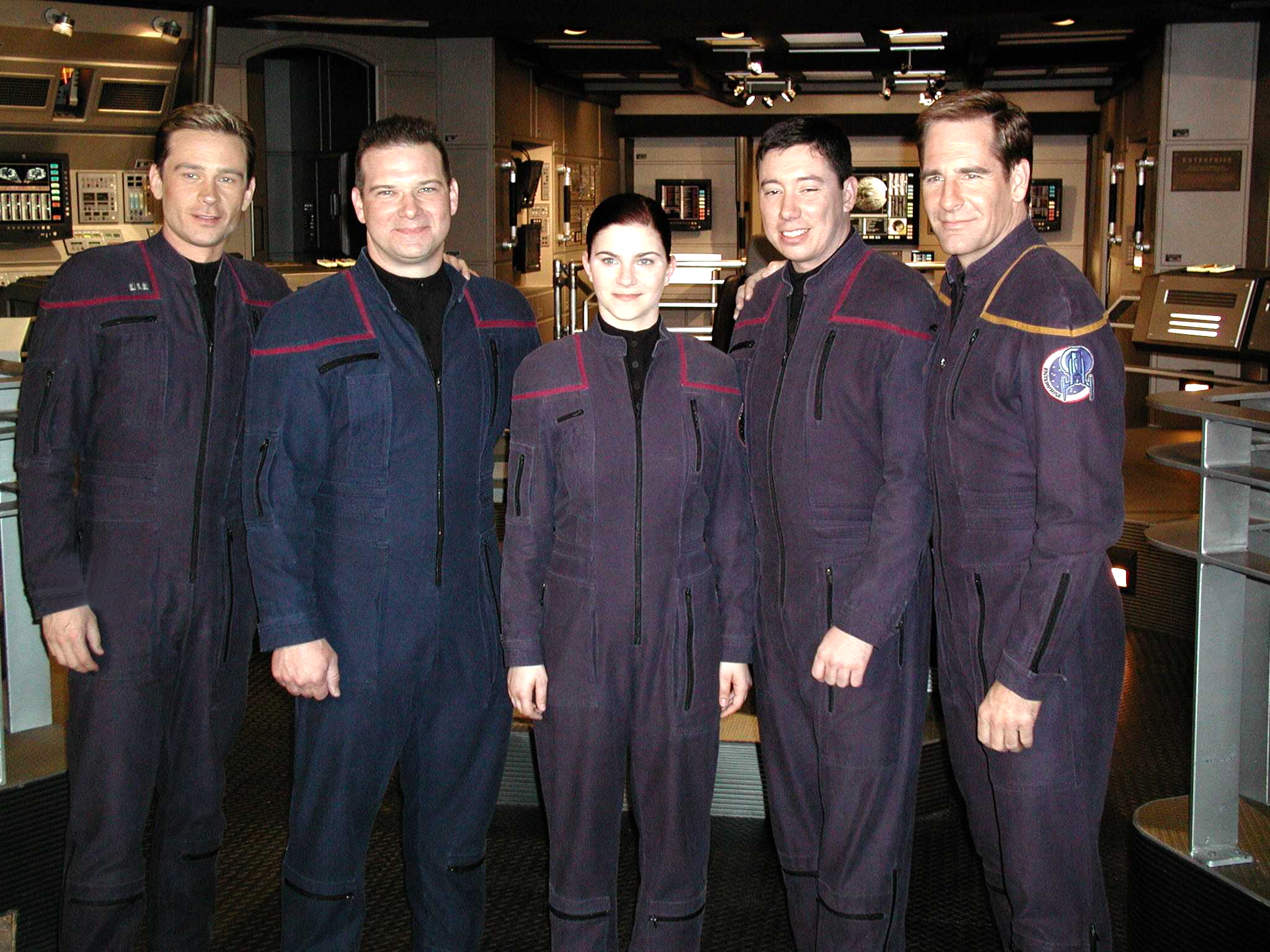
Connor Trinneer (pictured far left) and Scott Bakula (pictured far right) in costume alongside three members of the crew of the USS Enterprise (CVN-65).

Star Trek: Enterprise is an American science fiction television series that debuted on UPN on September 26, 2001, and ran for four seasons until May 13, 2005. The show was the fifth live-action series in the Star Trek franchise, and was intended to serve as a prequel to Star Trek: The Original Series. It was originally entitled Enterprise, but was renamed to add the Star Trek prefix towards the start of the third season. The series was created by Rick Berman and Brannon Braga, both of whom served as executive producers throughout the four seasons. They stood down as show runners during the fourth season, with Manny Coto taking on the role instead.

The casting team pursued Scott Bakula for the role of Jonathan Archer, with no other actors in mind. There were extended contract negotiations, and Bakula signed up for another pilot during the talks which didn't go to series, and he instead signed for Enterprise. Both Anthony Montgomery and Dominic Keating had previously auditioned for roles on Star Trek: Voyager and were hired when they returned for Enterprise. Braga later explained that the most difficult casting process was for the role of T'Pol, who had been originally envisioned as the character T'Pau from The Original Series episode "Amok Time". Jolene Blalock was cast after attending the final casting session, after her agents had previously rejected invitations to attend auditions.

Some recurring characters were played by actors who had previously appeared in the franchise, with Jeffrey Combs portraying the Andorian Shran, making his first appearance in the season one episode "The Andorian Incident". He had previously portrayed the characters Weyoun and Brunt on Deep Space Nine. Vaughn Armstrong, who played Admiral Maxwell Forrest in Enterprise, had previously appeared in a number of roles throughout the franchise since portraying a Klingon in The Next Generation episode "Heart of Glory" and by the end of the Enterprise run, he had appeared as 13 different characters in total. Randy Oglesby, Rick Worthy and Scott MacDonald had also appeared in a variety of parts within the franchise before taking on the recurring parts of Xindi council members throughout the third season.

== Cast ==
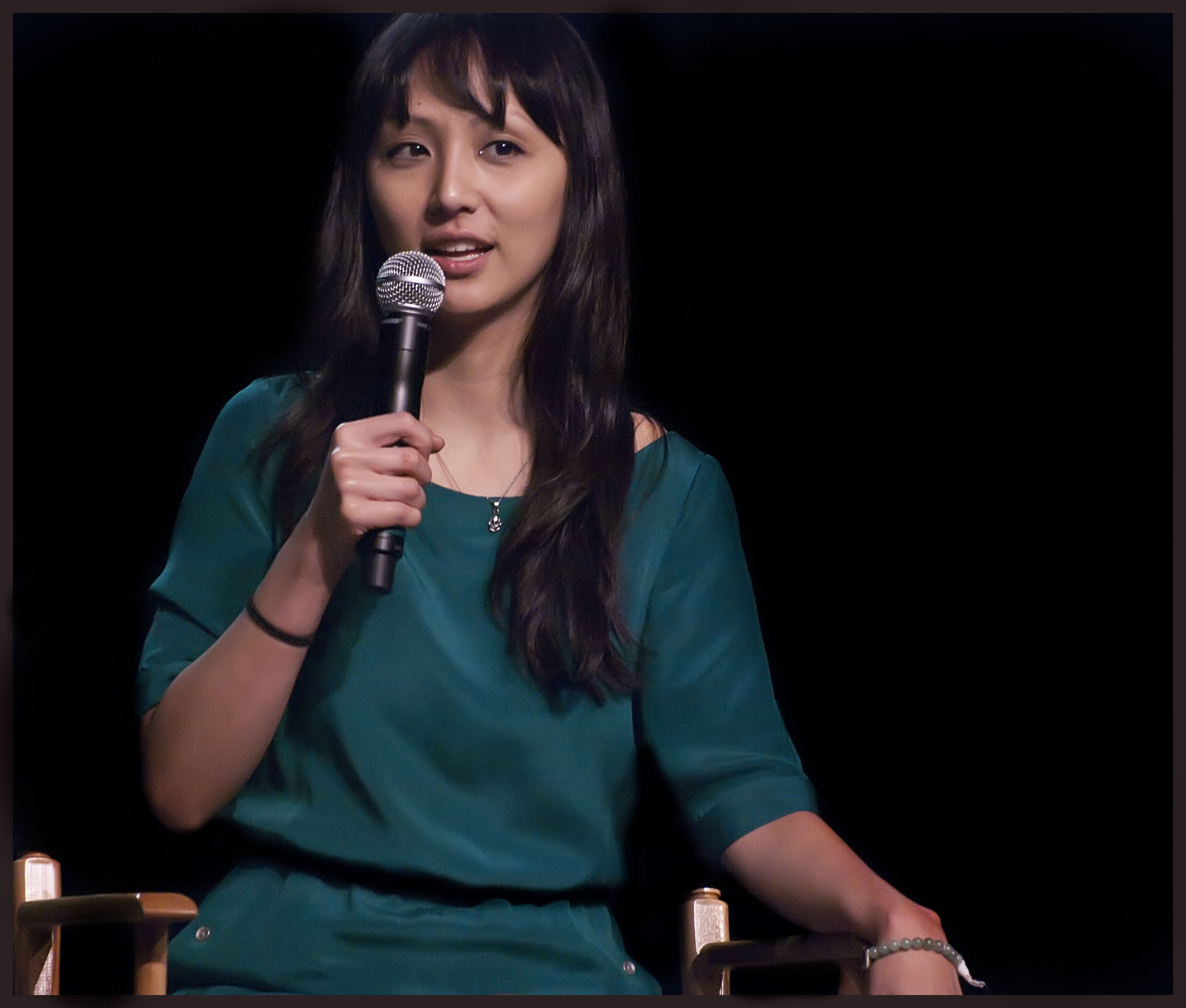
Linda Park plays the communications officer Hoshi Sato

=== Main cast ===
- Scott Bakula as Jonathan Archer, commanding officer of the USS Enterprise NX-01
- Jolene Blalock as T'Pol, first officer and science officer.
- John Billingsley as Phlox, chief medical officer.
- Dominic Keating as Malcolm Reed, chief security/tactical officer.
- Anthony Montgomery as Travis Mayweather, conn officer.
- Linda Park as Hoshi Sato, communications officer.
- Connor Trinneer as Charles "Trip" Tucker III, chief engineer.

=== Recurring cast ===
- Nathan Anderson as N. Kemper, United Earth Military Assault Command Operations (MACO) officer.
- Vaughn Armstrong as Maxwell Forrest, flag officer in charge of the NX project at Starfleet Command.
- Molly Brink as Talas, officer in the Andorian Imperial Guard.
- Joanna Cassidy as T'Les, instructor at the Vulcan science academy and mother of T'Pol.
- Jeffrey Combs as Thy'lek Shran, A Commander in the Andorian Imperial Guard who becomes an unlikely ally of Archer and humanity.
- Steven Culp as J. Hayes, MACO commanding officer aboard Enterprise during the Xindi crisis.
- Daniel Dae Kim as D. Chang, MACO officer.
- Jim Fitzpatrick as Marcus Williams, officer in the NX project at Starfleet Command.
- John Fleck as Silik, officer of the Suliban Cabal.
- Gary Graham as Soval, Vulcan ambassador to Earth.
- James Horan as the Humanoid figure, a messenger from the future.
- Ken Lally as Taylor, Archer's steward.
- Scott MacDonald as Dolim, officer serving on the Xindi Council.
- Ada Maris as Erika Hernandez, commanding officer of the USS Columbia NX-02.
- Sean McGowan as F. Hawkins, MACO officer.
- Randy Oglesby as Degra, scientist on the Xindi Council.
- Eric Pierpoint as Harris, Section 31 operative.
- Michael Reilly Burke as Koss, a Vulcan architect arranged to marry T'Pol.
- Daniel Riordan as Duras, Klingon commander.
- Tucker Smallwood as a Mallora, a Primate member of the Xindi Council.
- Kellie Waymire as Elizabeth Cutler, science officer.
- Joseph Will as Michael Rostov, engineering officer.
- Derek Magyar as Kelby, replacement chief engineer.
- Matt Winston as Daniels, a temporal agent from the 31st century.
- Rick Worthy as Jannar, member of the Xindi Council.
- Kara Zediker as T'Pau, member of the Vulcan Syrrannite movement.

== Appearances ==
= Main cast (credited)
= Recurring cast (4+)
= Guest cast (1-3)

Actor	Character	Season				Ref
Actor	Character	1	2	3	4	Ref
Main cast
Scott Bakula	Jonathan Archer	Main	Main	Main	Main	
Jolene Blalock	T'Pol	Main	Main	Main	Main	
John Billingsley	Phlox	Main	Main	Main	Main	
Dominic Keating	Malcolm Reed	Main	Main	Main	Main	
Anthony Montgomery	Travis Mayweather	Main	Main	Main	Main	
Linda Park	Hoshi Sato	Main	Main	Main	Main	
Connor Trinneer	Charles "Trip" Tucker III	Main	Main	Main	Main	
Recurring cast
Vaughn Armstrong	Maxwell Forrest	Recurring	Recurring		Recurring	
Jeffrey Combs	Thy'lek Shran	Guest	Guest	Guest	Recurring	
Jim Fitzpatrick	Marcus Williams	Guest	Guest		Guest	
John Fleck	Silik	Recurring	Guest		Guest	
Gary Graham	Soval	Guest	Recurring	Guest	Recurring	
James Horan	Humanoid figure (Note: The character was nicknamed "Future Guy" by the fans of the series.)	Recurring	Guest			
Kellie Waymire	Elizabeth Cutler	Recurring				
Joseph Will	Michael Rostov	Guest	Guest			
Matt Winston	Daniels	Guest	Guest	Recurring	Guest	
Daniel Riordan	Duras		Guest			
Nathan Anderson	N. Kemper			Guest		
Molly Brink	Talas			Guest	Guest	
Steven Culp	J. Hayes			Recurring		
Daniel Dae Kim	D. Chang			Recurring		
Ken Lally	Taylor			Guest		
Scott MacDonald	Dolim			Recurring		
Sean McGowan	F. Hawkins			Recurring		
Randy Oglesby	Degra			Recurring		
Tucker Smallwood	Xindi Primate Councillor			Recurring		
Rick Worthy	Jannar			Recurring		
Joanna Cassidy	T'Les				Recurring	
Ada Maris	Erika Hernandez				Recurring	
Derek Magyar	Kelby				Recurring	
Kara Zediker	T'Pau				Guest	
Eric Pierpoint	Harris				Recurring	
Michael Reilly Burke	Koss				Recurring	

== See also ==
- List of Star Trek: The Original Series cast members
- List of Star Trek: Deep Space Nine cast members
- List of Star Trek: The Next Generation cast members
- List of Star Trek: Voyager cast members
- List of Star Trek: Discovery cast members
