= List of Star Trek: The Original Series cast members =

List of actors who have appeared on Star Trek: The Original Series.

== Cast ==
=== Main cast ===
- William Shatner as James T. Kirk, commanding officer of the USS Enterprise.
- Leonard Nimoy as Spock, first officer and science officer.
- DeForest Kelley as Leonard McCoy, chief medical officer.
- James Doohan as Montgomery Scott, second officer and chief engineer.
- Nichelle Nichols as Nyota Uhura, communications officer.
- Walter Koenig as Pavel Chekov, navigator and security/tactical officer.
- George Takei as Hikaru Sulu, helmsman
- Jeffrey Hunter as Captain Pike, commanding officer of the USS Enterprise in episode 1 The Cage.

=== Recurring cast ===
- Majel Barrett as Nurse Christine Chapel, medical officer. Barrett also voiced the ship's computer. Also played Number 1 in Episode 1 the Cage.
- Grace Lee Whitney as Janice Rand, Captain's yeoman.
- John Winston as Kyle, operations officer.
- Michael Barrier as Vincent DeSalle, navigator and assistant chief engineer.
- Roger Holloway as Roger Lemli, security officer.
- Eddie Paskey as Leslie, various positions.
- David L. Ross as Galloway, various positions.
- Jim Goodwin as John Farrell, navigator.
- Grant Woods as Kelowitz, science officer.
- William Blackburn as Hadley, helmsman.
- Frank da Vinci as Brent, various positions.
- Ron Veto as Harrison, various positions.

=== The Animated Series cast ===
- William Shatner as James T. Kirk, commanding officer of the USS Enterprise.
- Majel Barrett as Christine Chapel, medical officer.
- James Doohan as Montgomery Scott, chief engineer.
- DeForest Kelley as Leonard McCoy, chief medical officer.
- Nichelle Nichols as Uhura, communications officer.
- Leonard Nimoy as Spock, first officer and science officer.
- George Takei as Hikaru Sulu, helmsman.

=== "The Cage" cast ===
- Jeffrey Hunter as Christopher Pike, commanding officer of the USS Enterprise in 2254.
- Majel Barrett as Number One, first officer in 2254.
- Peter Duryea as José Tyler, navigator in 2254.
- Laurel Goodwin as J. M. Colt, Captain's yeoman in 2254.
- John Hoyt as Phillip Boyce, chief medical officer in 2254.
- Leonard Nimoy as Spock, science officer.

== Appearances ==
= Main cast (credited)
= Recurring cast (4+)
= Guest cast (1-3)

Actor	Character	Seasons				TAS		Films						Reboot		
Actor	Character	TC	1	2	3	1	2	I	II	III	IV	V	VI	ST	STID	STB
Main cast
Jeffrey Hunter	Christopher Pike	M	G (Note: Jeffrey Hunter only appeared in stock footage during the first season. In new material, Pike was played uncredited by Sean Kenney.)													
Bruce Greenwood	Christopher Pike													S	S	
Majel Barrett	Number One	M														
Majel Barrett	Christine Chapel		G	R	R	Main	Main	A			A					
Leonard Nimoy	Spock	Main	Main	Main	Main	Main	Main	Main	Main	Main	Main	Main	Main	S	A	
Zachary Quinto	Spock													Main	Main	Main
Laurel Goodwin	J. M. Colt	M														
John Hoyt	Phillip Boyce	M														
Peter Duryea	José Tyler	M														
William Shatner	James T. Kirk		Main	Main	Main	Main	Main	Main	Main	Main	Main	Main	Main			
Chris Pine	James T. Kirk													Main	Main	Main
DeForest Kelley	Leonard McCoy		R	Main	Main	Main	Main	Main	Main	Main	Main	Main	Main			
Karl Urban	Leonard McCoy													Main	Main	Main
James Doohan	Montgomery Scott		Recurring	Recurring	Recurring	Main	Main	Main	Main	Main	Main	Main	Main			
Simon Pegg	Montgomery Scott													Main	Main	Main
Nichelle Nichols	Nyota Uhura		Recurring	Recurring	Recurring	Main	Main	Main	Main	Main	Main	Main	Main			
Zoe Saldaña	Nyota Uhura													Main	Main	Main
George Takei	Hikaru Sulu		Recurring	Recurring	Recurring	Main	Main	Main	Main	Main	Main	Main	Main			
John Cho	Hikaru Sulu													Main	Main	Main
Walter Koenig	Pavel Chekov			R	R			Main	Main	Main	Main	Main	Main			
Anton Yelchin	Pavel Chekov													Main	Main	Main
Ricardo Montalbán	Khan Noonien Singh		G						M							
Benedict Cumberbatch	Khan Noonien Singh														M	
Recurring/Guest Cast
Grace Lee Whitney	Janice Rand		R					A			A		A			
John Winston	Kyle		Recurring	Recurring	Recurring	(Note: James Doohan voiced the character in the pilot of the animated series. The character continued to appear throughout the series but did not have any more lines.)			A							
Jim Goodwin	John Farrell		G													
Grant Woods	Kelowitz		G													
Michael Barrier	Vincent DeSalle		G	G												
William Blackburn	Hadley		Recurring	Recurring	Recurring											
Eddie Paskey	Lesley		Recurring	Recurring	Recurring											
David L. Ross	Galloway		R	R	G											
Roger Holloway	Roger Lemli			R	R											
Frank da Vinci	Brent		Recurring	Recurring	Recurring											
Bruce Hyde	Kevin Thomas Riley		G													
Ron Veto	Harrison		Recurring	Recurring	Recurring											
Mark Lenard	Sarek			G		G				S	S	A (Note: A young version of the character is played by Jonathan Simpson in Star Trek V: The Final Frontier.)	A			
Ben Cross	Sarek													S		
Jane Wyatt	Amanda Grayson			G		(Note: Majel Barrett voiced the character in the animated series.)					A	A				
Winona Ryder	Amanda Grayson													S		
Roger C. Carmel	Harry Mudd		G	G		G										
Kirstie Alley	Saavik								S							
Robin Curtis	Saavik									S	S					

== See also ==
- List of Star Trek: The Next Generation cast members
- List of Star Trek: Deep Space Nine cast members
- List of Star Trek: Voyager cast members
- List of Star Trek: Enterprise cast members
- List of Star Trek: Discovery cast members
