= List of Star Trek: The Next Generation cast members =

Star Trek: The Next Generation first-season cast photo. Six of the main actors appeared in all seven seasons and all four movies.

Star Trek: The Next Generation is an American science fiction television series that debuted in broadcast syndication on September 28, 1987. The series lasted for seven seasons until 1994, and was followed by four movies which were released between 1994 and 2002. The series was a follow-up to the original Star Trek series which was broadcast on NBC between 1966 and 1969, with characters from the original series appearing in The Next Generation on several occasions; a crossover movie titled Star Trek Generations was also released. The Next Generation was developed by creator Gene Roddenberry, who served as an executive producer until his death in 1991, along with Maurice Hurley, Rick Berman, Michael Piller and Jeri Taylor. The series was filmed primarily on the Paramount Studios lot in Los Angeles, California.

Preliminary casting began during March 1987, and the main cast was announced on May 15. The initial press release highlighted the casting of LeVar Burton, known for appearing in the miniseries Roots, as Geordi La Forge. Burton had auditioned for the role following a suggestion from executive producer Robert H. Justman, who had previously worked with him on a television movie. The only other two members of the cast mentioned were Patrick Stewart as Jean-Luc Picard and Jonathan Frakes as William Riker. Stewart was cast in the lead role after being spotted by Justman at a dramatic reading at the University of California, Los Angeles. However, the series' creator, Roddenberry, wanted a French actor and was considering the role of Data for Stewart. Both Justman and Berman campaigned for Stewart to have the role of Captain Picard, and Roddenberry relented. Frakes became Roddenberry's favorite for the role of Riker after the actor went through seven auditions for the role.

The producers sought a black actor to portray Worf, as it would make the Klingon make-up easier. Michael Dorn was cast due to his theater training and the lack of a "street-accent". The character was intended to appear in seven of the first thirteen episodes, but after Dorn's performance in the pilot "Encounter at Farpoint", this was expanded to a series regular. Roddenberry's intention for the casting of the new series was to avoid using characters similar to those that appeared in The Original Series. However, some of the elements of the characters of Riker and Deanna Troi were modeled on the characters of William Decker and Ilia, who were originally conceived for the unfilmed Star Trek: Phase II and later appeared in Star Trek: The Motion Picture. During casting, the role of Troi was originally assigned to Denise Crosby, with Marina Sirtis cast as Security Chief Macha Hernandez. Roddenberry believed that Sirtis would be better in the role of Troi and switched the two actresses; Crosby was cast as a modified version of the security chief, called Tasha Yar. Several candidates for the main roles were later cast in guest or recurring roles, including Eric Menyuk, who was second choice for the role of Data, and Rosalind Chao, who was originally considered for Tasha Yar. Tim Russ, who was considered for the role of Geordi La Forge, had a guest role on the series and would later be cast in main cast of Star Trek: Voyager as Tuvok.

Crosby left the series before the end of the first season, while Gates McFadden as Beverly Crusher was dropped after season one. Diana Muldaur joined the cast as Katherine Pulaski to replace McFadden but declined a place in the main cast list, instead receiving a "Special Appearance By" credit on the episodes where she appeared. Muldaur left after only one season and McFadden returned in season three. Crosby reprised the role of Yar in the season three episode "Yesterday's Enterprise", and returned for several more episodes as Yar's half Romulan daughter Sela. Wil Wheaton left the main cast during season four, but returned for a number of episodes in season five as well as a final appearance in season seven.

Several actors were cast in roles which recurred throughout the seven seasons on television and into the four feature films. Majel Barrett, referred to as "The First Lady of Star Trek" due to her marriage with Roddenberry, appeared both as the voice of Starfleet computers and as Lwaxana Troi. The part of Lwaxana was specifically created for her. She had appeared in The Original Series and two Star Trek films as Christine Chapel, and as Number One in the original pilot "The Cage". John de Lancie was cast as Q despite missing his first audition as it conflicted with a play he was in at the time. A second audition was arranged, where de Lancie impressed Roddenberry, who told him that "You make my words sound better than they are." Colm Meaney was originally cast as an unnamed Ensign in "Encounter at Farpoint", but was subsequently cast as the Transporter Chief Miles O'Brien, appearing in 52 episodes in that role. Whoopi Goldberg approached the producers and asked for a role in the series, resulting in Roddenberry writing her the role of Guinan. She credits Nichelle Nichols as Uhura in The Original Series as inspiring her, saying "when I was nine years old Star Trek came on, I looked at it and I went screaming through the house, 'Come here, mom, everybody, come quick, come quick, there's a black lady on television and she ain't no maid!' I knew right then and there I could be anything I wanted to be." She made her first appearance in the second-season episode "The Child" and went on to appear in a total of 28 episodes plus both Star Trek Generations and Star Trek: Nemesis.

== Cast ==
= Main cast (credited)
= Recurring cast (4+)
= Guest cast (1–3)

Actor	Character	Seasons							Films			
Actor	Character	1	2	3	4	5	6	7	GEN	FCT	INS	NEM
Main cast
Patrick Stewart	Jean-Luc Picard	Main	Main	Main	Main	Main	Main	Main	Main	Main	Main	Main
Jonathan Frakes	William Riker	Main	Main	Main	Main	Main	Main	Main	Main	Main	Main	Main
LeVar Burton	Geordi La Forge	Main	Main	Main	Main	Main	Main	Main	Main	Main	Main	Main
Denise Crosby	Tasha Yar	Main		Guest				Guest				
Michael Dorn	Worf	Main	Main	Main	Main	Main	Main	Main	Main	Main	Main	Main
Gates McFadden	Beverly Crusher	Main		Main	Main	Main	Main	Main	Main	Main	Main	Main
Marina Sirtis	Deanna Troi	Main	Main	Main	Main	Main	Main	Main	Main	Main	Main	Main
Brent Spiner	Data	Main	Main	Main	Main	Main	Main	Main	Main	Main	Main	Main
Wil Wheaton	Wesley Crusher	Main (Note: Wil Wheaton is in the main cast of the first nine episodes of Season 4, departing in "Final Mission".)	Main	Main	Main	Guest		Guest				Guest
Recurring cast
Majel Barrett	Lwaxana Troi	Guest	Guest	Guest	Guest	Guest		Guest				
John de Lancie	Q	Guest	Guest	Guest	Guest		Guest	Guest				
Colm Meaney	Miles O'Brien	Guest	Recurring	Recurring	Recurring	Recurring	Guest	Guest				
Eric Menyuk	The Traveler	Guest			Guest			Guest				
Carel Struycken	Mr. Homn	Guest	Guest	Guest	Guest	Guest						
Diana Muldaur	Katherine Pulaski		Recurring									
Whoopi Goldberg	Guinan		Recurring	Recurring	Recurring	Recurring	Recurring		Guest			Guest
Lycia Naff	Sonya Gomez		Guest									
Robert O'Reilly	Gowron				Guest	Guest	Guest					
Suzie Plakson	K'Ehleyr		Guest		Guest							
Andreas Katsulas	Tomalak			Guest	Guest			Guest				
Dwight Schultz	Reginald Barclay			Guest	Guest		Guest	Guest		Guest		
Tony Todd	Kurn			Guest	Guest	Guest						
Rosalind Chao	Keiko O'Brien				Recurring	Recurring	Guest					
Denise Crosby	Sela				Guest	Guest						
Barbara March	Lursa				Guest	Guest		Guest	Guest			
Gwynyth Walsh	B'Etor				Guest	Guest		Guest	Guest			
Patti Yasutake	Alyssa Ogawa				Recurring	Recurring	Recurring	Recurring	Guest	Guest		
Brian Bonsall	Alexander Rozhenko					Recurring	Guest	Guest				
Jonathan Del Arco	Hugh of Borg					Guest	Guest	Guest				
Michelle Forbes	Ro Laren					Recurring	Guest	Guest				
Ashley Judd	Robin Lefler					Guest						
Ken Thorley	Mot					Guest	Guest					
Natalia Nogulich	Alynna Nechayev						Guest	Guest				

== See also ==
- List of Star Trek: The Original Series cast members
- List of Star Trek: Deep Space Nine cast members
- List of Star Trek: Voyager cast members
- List of Star Trek: Enterprise cast members
- List of Star Trek: Discovery cast members
