= Redshirt Blues =

2001 short film by David O. Rogers

- Erik Hill (Leeds) at left and Jack P. Dempsey (Averson) at right
- Directed by: David O. Rogers
- Written by: David O. Rogers
- Produced by: David O. Rogers
- Starring: Jack P. Dempsey; Erik Hill
- Release date: September 16, 2001
- Running time: 9 minutes
- Country: United States
- Language: English

Redshirt Blues is a 2001 fan film that was made by fans of original Star Trek. It was written, directed and produced by David O. Rogers. It satirizes the use of redshirts on the television series as well as the show itself, its fans, and popular culture.

== Plot ==
The disillusioned and disgruntled redshirt Crewman Averson is stuck on patrol on an unknown planet when he meets optimistic Crewman Leeds, who is new on board the USS Enterprise. As the two search for an energy field, Averson tells Leeds the true nature of redshirts as cannon fodder: "Redshirts die first" and goes on about his opinions on Captain Kirk, Spock, and other fixtures of the show. Leeds on the other hand says he is eager to serve in Starfleet, wants to learn to speak Klingon "just for fun" and his observation about how Qui-Gon Jinn doesn't disappear in Star Wars: Episode I – The Phantom Menace as does Obi-Wan Kenobi in Star Wars Episode IV: A New Hope. Eventually, the two encounter an alien resembling a floating orb. While Averson hides, Leeds is stuck admiring its beauty and is killed. Averson tries to contact the Enterprise with his communicator, which he finds is broken and replaces it with that of Leeds and moves on.

== Reception ==
Redshirt Blues was first shown in the 2000 Boston Film Festival, which The Boston Phoenix reporter Mike Miliard reviewed as a "great Star Trek parody". It was also screened at the 2000 Pacific Palisades Film Festival, 2001 Nodance Film Festival, and shown on a special Star Trek episode of Sci Fi Channel's short film television series Exposure on September 16, 2001. Entertainment Weekly reviews it as an "amusing riff on the hapless Starfleet crewmen whose uniforms invariably mark them for untimely deaths." Overall, Wook Kim rated the Exposure episode as "B".
