= List of Star Trek: Deep Space Nine cast members =

Star Trek: Deep Space Nine's cast in season five, after Michael Dorn (Worf) had joined in season four and before Terry Farrell (Jadzia Dax) left at the end of season six.

Star Trek: Deep Space Nine is an American science fiction television series that debuted in broadcast syndication on January 3, 1993. The series ran for seven seasons until 1999. The show was spun off from Star Trek: The Next Generation which debuted in 1987, with characters inhabiting a shared fictional universe. Deep Space Nine was developed by executive producers Rick Berman and Michael Piller, who together wrote the series bible. The show was filmed primarily on the Paramount Studios lot in Los Angeles, California.

Siddig El Fadil, later known as Alexander Siddig was an early front runner for the part of series protagonist Benjamin Sisko. Ultimately the producers thought he was too young for the role and instead offered him the part of Dr. Julian Amoros, who was subsequently renamed to Julian Bashir; the role of Sisko went to Avery Brooks. Deep Space Nine was originally intended to have Ro Laren, a character from The Next Generation as a main character. However, after actress Michelle Forbes declined to sign on for a five- to six-year commitment for the series, the part was re-written to become Major Kira Nerys, with Nana Visitor cast in that role. For similar reasons, Famke Janssen turned down the role of Jadzia Dax when offered, with Terry Farrell becoming the last main cast member to be cast with filming already underway on "Emissary". Two actors who were considered for main roles went on to be cast as recurring characters: Andrew Robinson was beaten to the role of Odo by René Auberjonois, but was cast as the Cardassian tailor/spy Elim Garak; similarly, Max Grodénchik lost the role of Quark to Armin Shimerman, but was subsequently cast as that character's brother, Rom.

There were several actors who appeared in Deep Space Nine in roles they had previously played in other Star Trek series. The most prominent of these was Colm Meaney, who played Chief Miles O'Brien. Meaney had first appeared as an unnamed crewman in the pilot episode, "Encounter at Farpoint", and went on to appear in a total of 52 episodes of The Next Generation. Miles' wife Keiko O'Brien had also appeared on The Next Generation and became a recurring character on Deep Space Nine, as played by Rosalind Chao. Majel Barrett appeared as Lwaxana Troi, having also originally appeared in The Next Generation. She was intended to be a recurring character in the new show, and also continued to voice the Starfleet computers as in the earlier series.

The series had several long-running antagonists. Marc Alaimo portrayed Gul Dukat, the Cardassian former commander of Deep Space Nine who later led his people into joining the Dominion. Dukat had been included in the series bible as a recurring character described as someone who "represents the continuing threat to our people". There were several Dominion characters who appeared from the third season onwards, including Salome Jens as the Female Shapeshifter, and Jeffrey Combs as Weyoun. Combs was unique in Deep Space Nine for simultaneously playing two recurring characters – Weyoun and the Ferengi Brunt – in the same episode, "The Dogs of War".

The fourth season saw a change in direction for the series with the producers asked to "shake up the show" by Paramount, and the addition of a main cast member. Rick Berman suggested adding a Klingon contingent to the show, adding Michael Dorn to the main cast in the role of Worf, which he had played for seven seasons on The Next Generation. The changes also brought in J. G. Hertzler as General Martok, who became a recurring character. Hertzler had previously appeared in the pilot of the series as a Vulcan Captain on board the USS Saratoga, and Martok would end the series as the Klingon Chancellor.

One further change to the main cast occurred between the sixth and seventh seasons. Terry Farrell elected not to renew her contract, so her character was killed in the final episode of season six. She was replaced by Nicole de Boer, who was cast as Ezri Dax.

== Cast ==
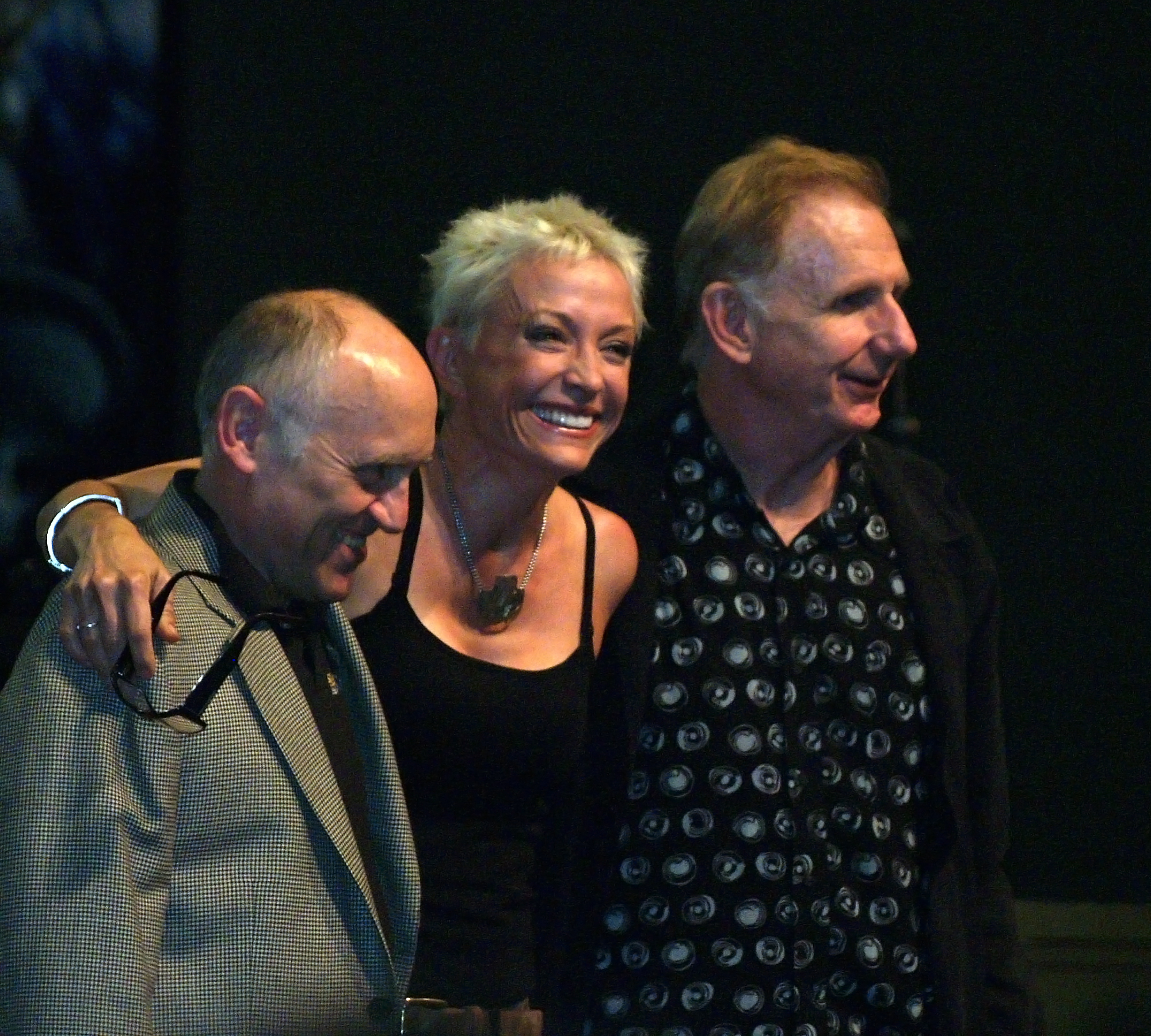
Shimerman, Visitor and Auberjonois

=== Main cast ===
- Avery Brooks as Benjamin Sisko, commanding officer of space station Deep Space Nine until his disappearance in 2375
- René Auberjonois as Odo, chief of security until 2375
- Terry Farrell as Jadzia Dax, chief science officer until her death in 2374
- Cirroc Lofton as Jake Sisko, son of Benjamin Sisko
- Colm Meaney as Miles O'Brien, chief operations officer and later Starfleet Academy professor
- Armin Shimerman as Quark, bar owner
- Alexander Siddig as Julian Bashir, chief medical officer
- Nana Visitor as Kira Nerys, first officer of Deep Space Nine
- Michael Dorn as Worf, strategic operations officer and later Federation Ambassador to the Klingon Empire
- Nicole de Boer as Ezri Dax, station's counselor

=== Recurring cast ===
- Cecily Adams as Ishka, mother to Quark & Rom and a Ferengi entrepreneur
- Marc Alaimo as Dukat, Cardassian officer, leader of the Cardassian Union, a leader of the Dominion, and later a Bajoran religious leader
- Philip Anglim as Bareil Antos, Bajoran religious leader until his death in 2371
- Adrienne Barbeau as Kimara Cretak, Romulan liaison to Deep Space Nine
- Majel Barrett as Lwaxana Troi, Federation Ambassador
- Felecia M. Bell as Jennifer Sisko, Benjamin Sisko's deceased wife and mother of Jake Sisko
- Casey Biggs as Damar, Cardassian officer, a leader of the Dominion, and later the leader of the Cardassian resistance until his death in 2375
- Rosalind Chao as Keiko O'Brien, botanist, teacher, and wife of Miles O'Brien
- Jeffrey Combs as Weyoun, a Dominion leader, and Brunt, liquidator with the Ferengi Commerce Authority
- John Colicos as Kor, Klingon warrior and friend of Jadzia Dax
- James Darren as Vic Fontaine, a holographic entertainer
- Paul Dooley as Enabran Tain, former head of the Obsidian Order
- Aron Eisenberg as Nog, Quark's nephew, student, Starfleet cadet, and later operations officer
- Louise Fletcher as Winn Adami, Bajoran religious leader and later Kai of Bajor
- Max Grodénchik as Rom, Quark's brother, bar employee, and later a maintenance engineer until he was appointed Grand Nagus in 2375
- Hana Hatae as Molly O'Brien, daughter of Miles O'Brien and Keiko O'Brien
- J. G. Hertzler as Martok, Klingon liaison to Deep Space Nine, and later leader of the Klingon Empire
- Barry Jenner as William Ross, Field Commander of Starfleet forces during the Dominion War
- Salome Jens as the Female Changeling, leader of the Dominion until her incarceration in 2375.
- Penny Johnson Jerald as Kasidy Yates, freighter captain and wife of Benjamin Sisko
- Deborah Lacey as Sarah Sisko, mother of Benjamin Sisko
- Kenneth Marshall as Michael Eddington, security officer and later Maquis rebel until his death in 2373
- Chase Masterson as Leeta, a Dabo girl and Rom's wife
- Julianna McCarthy as Mila, housekeeper to Enabran Tain
- Natalia Nogulich as Alynna Nechayev, flag officer in charge of Cardassian affairs
- Robert O'Reilly as Gowron, leader of the Klingon Empire until his death in 2375.
- Brock Peters as Joseph Sisko, restaurant owner and father of Benjamin Sisko
- Duncan Regehr as Shakaar Edon, resistance leader, farmer, and later First Minister of Bajor
- Andrew Robinson as Elim Garak, tailor and former member of the Obsidian Order.
- William Sadler as Luther Sloan, an operative of Section 31
- Camille Saviola as Opaka Sulan, Kai of Bajor until her death, resurrection and marooning on a penal colony
- Wallace Shawn as Zek, Grand Nagus until his retirement in 2375
- Mark Allen Shepherd as Morn, freighter captain and bar patron
- James Sloyan as Mora Pol, a Bajoran scientist who studied Odo
- Melanie Smith as Tora Ziyal, daughter of Dukat, and an artist until her death in 2374
- Tiny Ron Taylor as Maihar'du, attendant to Grand Nagus Zek
- Marc Worden as Alexander Rozhenko, a Klingon officer and Worf's son
- John Vickery as Rusot, the deputy of Legate Damar in the Cardassian resistance

== Appearances ==
= Main cast (credited)
= Recurring cast (4+)
= Guest cast (1-3)

Actor	Character	Seasons						
Actor	Character	1	2	3	4	5	6	7
Main cast
Avery Brooks	Benjamin Sisko	Main	Main	Main	Main	Main	Main	Main
René Auberjonois	Odo	Main	Main	Main	Main	Main	Main	Main
Terry Farrell	Jadzia Dax	Main	Main	Main	Main	Main	Main	
Cirroc Lofton	Jake Sisko	Main	Main	Main	Main	Main	Main	Main
Colm Meaney	Miles O'Brien	Main	Main	Main	Main	Main	Main	Main
Armin Shimerman	Quark	Main	Main	Main	Main	Main	Main	Main
Alexander Siddig	Julian Bashir	Main	Main	Main	Main	Main	Main	Main
Nana Visitor	Kira Nerys	Main	Main	Main	Main	Main	Main	Main
Michael Dorn	Worf				Main	Main	Main	Main
Nicole de Boer	Ezri Dax							Main
Recurring cast
Marc Alaimo	Dukat	Guest	Recurring	Recurring	Recurring	Recurring	Recurring	Recurring
Rosalind Chao	Keiko O'Brien	Recurring	Recurring	Guest	Recurring	Recurring	Guest	Guest
Aron Eisenberg	Nog	Recurring	Recurring	Recurring	Recurring	Recurring	Recurring	Recurring
Max Grodénchik	Rom	Recurring	Recurring	Recurring	Recurring	Recurring	Recurring	Recurring
Hana Hatae	Molly O'Brien	Guest	Guest	Guest	Recurring	Guest	Guest	Guest
Andrew Robinson	Elim Garak	Guest	Recurring	Recurring	Recurring	Recurring	Recurring	Recurring
Mark Allen Shepherd	Morn	Recurring	Recurring	Recurring	Recurring	Recurring	Recurring	Recurring
Louise Fletcher	Winn Adami	Guest	Recurring	Guest		Guest	Guest	Recurring
Philip Anglim	Bareil Antos	Guest	Recurring	Guest			Guest	
Majel Barrett	Lwaxana Troi	Guest		Guest	Guest			
Felecia M. Bell	Jennifer Sisko	Guest		Guest	Guest			
Camille Saviola	Opaka Sulan	Guest	Guest		Guest			
Wallace Shawn	Zek	Guest	Guest	Guest		Guest	Guest	Guest
Tiny Ron Taylor	Maihar'du	Guest	Guest	Guest		Guest	Guest	Guest
John Colicos	Kor		Guest		Guest			Guest
Paul Dooley	Enabran Tain		Guest	Guest		Guest		
Julianna McCarthy	Mila			Guest				Guest
Natalia Nogulich	Alynna Nechayev		Guest	Guest				
James Sloyan	Mora Pol		Guest			Guest		
Jonathan Frakes	Thomas Riker			Guest				
Salome Jens	Female Changeling			Recurring	Guest		Recurring	Recurring
Penny Johnson Jerald	Kasidy Yates			Guest	Recurring	Guest	Guest	Recurring
Chase Masterson	Leeta			Guest	Guest	Recurring	Recurring	Recurring
Kenneth Marshall	Michael Eddington			Recurring	Recurring	Guest		
Robert O'Reilly	Gowron			Guest	Guest	Guest		Guest
Duncan Regehr	Shakaar Edon			Guest	Guest	Guest		
Jeffrey Combs	Brunt			Guest	Guest	Guest	Guest	Guest
Jeffrey Combs	Weyoun				Guest	Recurring	Recurring	Recurring
Casey Biggs	Damar				Guest	Guest	Recurring	Recurring
J. G. Hertzler	Martok				Guest	Recurring	Recurring	Recurring
Brock Peters	Joseph Sisko				Guest		Guest	Guest
Melanie Smith^{f}	Tora Ziyal				Guest	Recurring	Recurring	
Cecily Adams^{f}	Ishka			Guest		Guest	Guest	Guest
James Darren	Vic Fontaine						Guest	Recurring
Barry Jenner	William Ross						Recurring	Recurring
William Sadler	Luther Sloan						Guest	Guest
Marc Worden	Alexander Rozhenko						Guest	
Deborah Lacey	Sarah Sisko							Recurring
John Vickery	Rusot							Recurring

== See also ==
- List of Star Trek: The Original Series cast members
- List of Star Trek: The Next Generation cast members
- List of Star Trek: Voyager cast members
- List of Star Trek: Enterprise cast members
- List of Star Trek: Discovery cast members

== Notes ==
- F: This character also appeared in three episodes of season four, played by Cyia Batten in the first two and Tracy Middendorf in the third.
- F: This character was previously portrayed in a single season three appearance by Andrea Martin.
