= In the Flesh (Star Trek: Voyager) =

- Star Trek: Voyager episode
- Episode no.: Season 5 Episode 4
- Directed by: David Livingston
- Written by: Nick Sagan
- Production code: 198
- Original air date: November 4, 1998

Guest appearances
- Ray Walston - Boothby; Kate Vernon - Cmdr. Valerie Archer; Zach Galligan - Ens. Gentry; Tucker Smallwood - Adm. Bullock

Episode chronology
← Previous "Extreme Risk"	Next → "Once Upon a Time"
- Star Trek: Voyager season 5

"In the Flesh" is the fourth episode of season five of the science fiction television series Star Trek: Voyager, the 98th episode overall. It originally aired on November 4, 1998. The story was written by Nick Sagan, son of astronomer Carl Sagan.

== Plot ==
On stardate 52136.4, the Federation starship Voyager encounters a space station that contains a near-complete recreation of Starfleet Academy on Earth. First Officer Chakotay and Tactical Officer Tuvok have investigated the recreation, finding that those inside appear to be Starfleet personnel, cadets, and others, such as the groundskeeper Boothby, played by Ray Walston. Chakotay also meets an officer, Commander Valerie Archer, and arranges to meet her later for a date. Caught in an area they should not be in by a cadet, Chakotay and Tuvok stun him and transport him back to Voyager. When they attempt to question the cadet and take a DNA sample, he commits suicide. The Doctor discovers the "cadet" is really a genetically-altered member of Species 8472, a highly dangerous race the crew had previously encountered. Captain Janeway orders Seven of Nine to begin preparing warheads using her Borg nanoprobes, but also looks for a diplomatic solution, sending Chakotay back to the simulation to learn more.

Chakotay keeps a date he earlier arranged with Valerie, during which she speaks candidly about the simulation, with which Chakotay attempts to play along. Valerie secretly takes a sample of his DNA and discovers that Chakotay is human. She alerts her superiors, and soon Chakotay is captured. Boothby, appearing as the highest-ranking member of Species 8472 present at the simulation, interrogates Chakotay, believing that Starfleet is preparing to invade fluidic space and attack their species. The Voyager crew arrives at the simulation to attempt to rescue Chakotay, creating a tense stalemate. Janeway and Boothby agree to enter negotiations to settle the matter peacefully.

During these talks, the Voyager crew learn that this station is but one of several similar training grounds for Species 8472, and question if the species themselves are planning to invade Earth, while the aliens steadfastly refuse to believe that Starfleet is not preparing to attack them. Janeway, seeing the stalemate, orders her crew to stand down, which gains the trust of Valerie and Boothby. They reveal the stations are not a staging area, but only a reconnaissance mission to prepare themselves for an eventual invasion by Starfleet. Agreeing that a truce is possible, the Voyager crew trades information on the Borg nanoprobes for Species 8472's information on genetic modifications. The two sides complete their discussions, and soon Voyager resumes its journey home with less fear of the threat from Species 8472.

== Production ==
According to writer Nick Sagan, the original concept for "In The Flesh" had the Voyager crew discovering a picture of Species 8472 in an ancient Earth culture, leading them to discover that some human legends of demons and devils grew out of early contact with Species 8472. When the writers could not work this idea out, Sagan wrote the episode as a Cold War parable, using his father's work toward détente as inspiration. Sagan says that the episode originally "didn't end quite so 'happy happy;'" it had a more ambiguous ending. Producer Brannon Braga wanted to resolve the issue. Originally, the script called for a dream sequence where Species 8472 razed Janeway's hometown on Earth. However, due to the very high cost of the computer animation used for Species 8472, the scene was scrapped.

Sagan believes that the character of Valerie Archer "is in some way a connection to Captain Jonathan Archer on Enterprise." (Valerie says that she comes from a long line of Starfleet officers, so it is possible that the real Valerie Archer is one of Jonathan Archer's descendants.) Archer's name is an homage to two other science-fiction characters: Dave Bowman, the lead character of 2001: A Space Odyssey; and Ellie Arroway, the lead character in Carl Sagan's novel Contact. "You put bow and arrow together and you get Archer," said Sagan.

Tucker Smallwood made his first appearance in the Star Trek franchise with "In the Flesh". At the time he was recovering from bell's palsy, paralysing half of his face. He only initially agreed to an audition because he thought he would play an alien and have it covered by make-up. Instead, he played the human form of the member of Species 8472 masquerading as Admiral Bullock. He later went on to gain the recurring role of the Xindi-Primate council member in the third season of Star Trek: Enterprise.

The computer monitor used by Species 8472 in this episode is largely composed of parts from an earlier prop: a Krenim game used in the Star Trek: Voyager episode "The Year of Hell, Part II". This monitor reappears in the later episodes "Life Line" and "Nightingale"; in both episodes, it still displays symbols associated with Species 8472.

Actor Robert Beltran, who played Chakotay, listed "In The Flesh" among his favorite episodes of the series.

== Reception ==
TrekWeb gave the episode an "A-/A" rating, calling it "Voyager's best this year, with a nice twist and a wonderful message" despite what "really was a bad premise". Michelle Erica Green of The Trek Nation found the episode "engrossing... apart from unfortunate similarities with the excellent Deep Space Nine episode "Homefront", which also took place at Starfleet Command and focused on shapeshifting aliens who were planning to infiltrate Earth." Green found that the episode "had nice balance and some clever wit."

== Releases ==
On November 9, 2004, this episode was released as part of the season 5 DVD box set of Star Trek: Voyager. The box set includes 7 DVD optical discs with all the episodes in season 5 with some extra features, and episodes have a Dolby 5.1 Digital Audio track.

On April 25, 2001, this episode was released on LaserDisc in Japan, as part of the half-season collection, 5th Season vol.1 . This included episodes from "Night" to "Bliss" on seven double sided 12 inch optical discs, with English and Japanese audio tracks for the episodes.
