= Star Trek: Strange New Worlds season 5 =

Star Trek: Strange New Worlds
- Season 5
- Showrunners: Akiva Goldsman; Henry Alonso Myers
- Starring: Anson Mount; Ethan Peck; Jess Bush; Christina Chong; Celia Rose Gooding; Melissa Navia; Babs Olusanmokun; Martin Quinn; Rebecca Romijn

Release
- Original network: Paramount+

Season chronology
- ← Previous; Season 4

The fifth and final season of the American television series Star Trek: Strange New Worlds follows Captain Christopher Pike and the crew of the starship Enterprise in the 23rd century as they explore new worlds and carry out missions during the decade before Star Trek: The Original Series (1966–1969). The season is being produced by CBS Studios in association with Secret Hideout, Weed Road Pictures, H M R X Productions, and Roddenberry Entertainment, with Akiva Goldsman and Henry Alonso Myers as showrunners.

Anson Mount, Ethan Peck, and Rebecca Romijn respectively star as Pike, Spock, and Number One, along with Jess Bush, Christina Chong, Celia Rose Gooding, Melissa Navia, Babs Olusanmokun, and Martin Quinn. Many of the regular actors and several guest stars portray younger versions of characters from The Original Series. A fifth and final season of Strange New Worlds was ordered in June 2025. Filming took place at CBS Stages Canada in Mississauga, Ontario, from September to December 2025.

The season is expected to premiere on the streaming service Paramount+ and run for six episodes.

== Episodes ==
No. overall	No. in season	Title	Directed by	Written by	Original release date
41	1	TBA	Dan Liu	Alan B. McElroy	TBA
42	2	TBA	Jordan Canning	Story by : Vicky Kerkhove & Henry Alonso Myers; Teleplay by : Vicky Kerkhove & Henry Alonso Myers & Bill Wolkoff	TBA
43	3	TBA	Axelle Carolyn	Robbie Thompson	TBA
44	4	TBA	TBA	Dana Horgan	TBA
45	5	TBA	Chris Fisher	Story by : Skylar J. Ojeda & Bill Wolkoff & Alan B. McElroy; Teleplay by : Alan B. McElroy	TBA
46	6	TBA	Akiva Goldsman	Akiva Goldsman	TBA

== Cast and characters ==
=== Main ===
- Anson Mount as Christopher Pike
- Ethan Peck as Spock
- Jess Bush as Christine Chapel
- Christina Chong as La'An Noonien-Singh
- Celia Rose Gooding as Nyota Uhura
- Melissa Navia as Erica Ortegas
- Babs Olusanmokun as Joseph M'Benga
- Martin Quinn as Montgomery Scott
- Rebecca Romijn as Una Chin-Riley / Number One

=== Guests ===
- Paul Wesley as James T. Kirk
- Thomas Jane as Leonard "Bones" McCoy
- Kai Murakami as Hikaru Sulu

== Production ==
=== Development ===
Executive producer Alex Kurtzman envisioned Star Trek: Strange New Worlds, a spin-off from the series Star Trek: Discovery (2017–2024), as an ongoing series that could cover the seven years between Discovery's second season (2019) and the accident that seriously injures Christopher Pike in Star Trek: The Original Series (1966–1969). Co-showrunner Akiva Goldsman hoped Strange New Worlds would continue until it caught up with the events of The Original Series. Amid financial issues and an ongoing merger process with Skydance Media, Paramount Global decided to end the series after the fourth season. Showrunners Goldsman and Henry Alonso Myers did not want it to end without connecting to The Original Series, and said they would need six more episodes to do that. Paramount, CBS Studios, and Kurtzman's production company Secret Hideout did not want a similar situation to Discovery, which was denied a proper conclusion following its cancelation, and worked together to find a way for those additional episodes to be made. In June 2025, ahead of the third season's premiere and during production on the fourth season, a six-episode fifth and final season was announced. Goldsman and Myers said they were grateful to be given the abbreviated final season so they could complete their "five-season mission".

=== Writing ===
Following the season's announcement, star Anson Mount said the showrunners had started discussing their plans for it and noted that they had "a hell of a job to do in a very fast amount of time". Myers said it was important to them that they get to give the series an ending and make it "as good as possible—as good as we would like it as fans of this genre, as fans of Star Trek." Goldsman said the showrunners had a "five-year plan", inspired by the traditional Star Trek five year mission, to show how the returning characters become who they are at the start of The Original Series and what happens to some of the other characters. He added that the season would show James T. Kirk's first day in command of the USS Enterprise (NCC-1701) as Pike's successor, some time before the events of Kirk's first The Original Series episode "Where No Man Has Gone Before" (1966).

=== Casting ===
Anson Mount, Ethan Peck, and Rebecca Romijn star in the series as Captain Christopher Pike, science officer Spock, and first officer Una Chin-Riley / Number One, respectively. Also starring are Jess Bush as nurse Christine Chapel, Christina Chong as chief security officer La'An Noonien-Singh, Celia Rose Gooding as communications officer Nyota Uhura, Melissa Navia as helmsman Erica Ortegas, Babs Olusanmokun as Dr. Joseph M'Benga, and Martin Quinn as engineer Montgomery Scott.

Following the season's announcement, Myers confirmed that Paul Wesley—who replaced The Original Series star William Shatner as James T. Kirk for the series—would be reprising his role for the fifth season. There was also speculation that the Original Series characters Leonard "Bones" McCoy and Hikaru Sulu—originally portrayed by DeForest Kelley and George Takei, respectively—would be introduced by the end of Strange New Worlds. After filming wrapped on the series finale, the two characters were confirmed to be appearing in that episode portrayed by Thomas Jane and Kai Murakami, respectively.

=== Filming ===
Filming began on September 17, 2025, at CBS Stages Canada in Mississauga, Ontario, under the working title Lily and Isaac. Dan Liu, Jordan Canning, and Axelle Carolyn directed the first three episodes, all returning from previous seasons. Producing director Chris Fisher directed the penultimate episode, and Goldsman directed the series finale. Filming for the season wrapped on December 19.

== Release ==
The season is expected to premiere on the streaming service Paramount+ in the United States, Canada, the United Kingdom, Latin America, Australia, South Korea, Italy, France, Germany, Switzerland, and Austria. It will run for six episodes. In June 2025, the season was expected to premiere at least two years later. The series is released in New Zealand on TVNZ, in India on Voot, and in other European countries on SkyShowtime (a combination of Paramount+ and the streaming service Peacock).
