= Star Trek: Strange New Worlds season 3 =

Star Trek: Strange New Worlds
- Season 3
- Promotional poster
- Showrunners: Akiva Goldsman; Henry Alonso Myers
- Starring: Anson Mount; Ethan Peck; Jess Bush; Christina Chong; Celia Rose Gooding; Melissa Navia; Babs Olusanmokun; Martin Quinn; Rebecca Romijn
- No. of episodes: 10

Release
- Original network: Paramount+
- Original release: July 17 – September 11, 2025

Season chronology
- ← Previous; Season 2 Next → Season 4

The third season of the American television series Star Trek: Strange New Worlds follows Captain Christopher Pike and the crew of the starship Enterprise in the 23rd century as they explore new worlds and carry out missions during the decade before Star Trek: The Original Series (1966–1969). The season was produced by CBS Studios in association with Secret Hideout, Weed Road Pictures, H M R X Productions, and Roddenberry Entertainment, with Akiva Goldsman and Henry Alonso Myers as showrunners.

Anson Mount, Ethan Peck, and Rebecca Romijn respectively star as Pike, Spock, and Number One, along with Jess Bush, Christina Chong, Celia Rose Gooding, Melissa Navia, Babs Olusanmokun, and Martin Quinn. Many of the regular actors and several guest stars portray younger versions of characters from The Original Series. Planning for a third season of Strange New Worlds began by June 2022, and it was officially announced in March 2023 ahead of an intended filming start that May. Production was delayed by the 2023 Hollywood labor disputes and instead started in December 2023. Filming took place at CBS Stages Canada in Mississauga, Ontario, until May 2024. The showrunners continued the series' episodic storytelling approach, giving each episode a different genre and tone, such as the murder mystery episode "A Space Adventure Hour".

The season premiered on the streaming service Paramount+ on July 17, 2025, with its first two episodes. The rest of the 10-episode run was released weekly until September 11. It initially received generally positive reviews, but critics ultimately found the season to be tonally uneven and a step down from the previous two. It was nominated for several Saturn Awards. A fourth season was announced in April 2024.

== Episodes ==
No. overall	No. in season	Title	Directed by	Written by	Original release date
21	1	"Hegemony, Part II"	Chris Fisher	Teleplay by : Davy Perez; Story by : Henry Alonso Myers & Davy Perez	July 17, 2025
Captain Christopher Pike and the crew of the USS Enterprise plant a tracker on a Gorn ship that captured security chief La'An Noonien-Singh, Dr. Joseph M'Benga, pilot Erica Ortegas, xenoanthropologist Sam Kirk, and many human colonists. Despite orders from Starfleet to stay in Federation space, Admiral Robert April allows the Enterprise to follow the tracker. Using engineer Montgomery "Scotty" Scott's Gorn transponder device to go undetected, they find an uncharted binary star system which hides the Gorn homeworld and a large invasion force. Using the Gorn's sensitivity to stellar activity, they trigger a long hibernation cycle by creating an artificial coronal mass ejection. La'An, M'Benga, Ortegas, and Sam escape with transporter codes for the colonists, enabling the Enterprise to rescue them. Ortegas is wounded during the escape, and the Enterprise suffers extensive damage. Meanwhile, Vulcan science officer Spock and nurse Christine Chapel neutralize the Gorn eggs inside Pike's girlfriend, Captain Marie Batel, using first officer Una Chin-Riley / Number One's augmented Illyrian blood.
22	2	"Wedding Bell Blues"	Jordan Canning	Kirsten Beyer & David Reed	July 17, 2025
Three months after the Gorn conflict, the Enterprise has been repaired at Starbase One and the crew prepare to celebrate the Federation's 100th anniversary. Following her research fellowship with archaeologist Dr. Roger Korby, Chapel rejoins the crew and brings Korby as her new romantic partner, disappointing Spock who hoped to rekindle his relationship with her. Spock is given a drink by an unfamiliar Vulcan bartender, and the next day he wakes up in a different reality where the crew are preparing to celebrate his and Chapel's wedding. The same unfamiliar being now appears as an Andorian wedding planner. Korby is aware of the change and confronts Spock, who regains his memories after punching Korby. At the wedding ceremony, Chapel regains her memories after Spock recites a poem that Korby once read to her. They confront the wedding planner, who is revealed to be a child-like extradimensional being and is reprimanded by his father. (Note: The extradimensional beings were identified off-screen as Trelane (the child) and Q (the father).) The beings leave and reality returns to normal. The crew celebrate, except for Ortegas who is emotionally scarred from her experience with the Gorn.
23	3	"Shuttle to Kenfori"	Dan Liu	Onitra Johnson & Bill Wolkoff	July 24, 2025
The Gorn DNA in Batel's body reactivates and her only chance of survival is a rare Chimera flower on the planet Kenfori, which is contested by the Federation and Klingons. Pike and M'Benga take a shuttle to the planet while the Enterprise hides nearby. They find the flower, which has transformed a group of scientists into zombies. When a Klingon ship arrives, Number One decides to approach the planet slowly to avoid detection. Ortegas moves faster than ordered, alerting the Klingons to their presence and forcing a riskier approach. Pike and M'Benga are tracked by Bytha, the daughter of Klingon ambassador Dak'Rah, who seeks to kill M'Benga to restore her family's honor. M'Benga confesses to murdering Dak'Rah and defeats Bytha in a duel, but spares her life. She sacrifices herself to allow M'Benga and Pike to escape from the zombies. Later, Number One reprimands Ortegas for her insubordination and relieves her of duty for two weeks. Pike is horrified to learn that Batel and M'Benga plan to use the flower to turn Batel into a human-Gorn hybrid, which he reluctantly accepts is her decision.
24	4	"A Space Adventure Hour"	Jonathan Frakes	Dana Horgan & Kathryn Lyn	July 31, 2025
La'An is tasked with testing the "holodeck", a new holographic simulator, and asks the computer to create a murder mystery for her to solve. It generates a scenario featuring the cast and crew of a 1960s science fiction series called The Last Frontier, using the likenesses of people who have boarded the Enterprise. As the story gets more involved, La'An asks for Spock's help. Scotty attempts to singlehandedly balance the large amount of power required to run the holodeck with the ship's other needs, barely allowing it to escape damage from a collapsing neutron star. When La'An is trapped and the holodeck's safety protocols fail, Scotty sends a message explaining that she must solve the mystery to end the simulation. La'An, who has grown close to Spock during dance lessons over recent months, realizes that the Spock she is with is a hologram and the murderer. The simulation ends, and La'An recommends holodecks not be approved for general use until the technology is improved. Number One encourages Scotty to ask for help in the future. During another dance lesson, La'An and the real Spock kiss.
25	5	"Through the Lens of Time"	Andi Armaganian	Onitra Johnson & Davy Perez	August 7, 2025
Junior medical officer Dana Gamble and Ortegas's documentarian brother Beto join an archaeological expedition led by Chapel and Korby, exploring an ancient building that Korby believes may hold the secret to immortality. When Gamble picks up a glowing orb, it explodes and destroys his eyes. He is transported back to the Enterprise while the rest of the away team, joined by Spock and La'An, are trapped in the building. M'Benga fails to restore Gamble's eyes and scans indicate that he is brain-dead, despite appearing to be conscious. The away team discovers that the building is a prison for the Vezda, extradimensional parasitic beings. They navigate the building's unusual metaphysical properties to escape. Batel, seemingly triggered by her Gorn DNA, recognizes Gamble as being possessed by a Vezda and attacks him. Gamble is apprehended by security and placed in the brig. He kills his guard, escapes, and takes Scotty, Sam Kirk, and chief engineer Pelia hostage to try to take control of the ship and free the other Vezda. Pelia kills him and Scotty traps the Vezda spirit in the transporter pattern buffer.
26	6	"The Sehlat Who Ate Its Tail"	Valerie Weiss	David Reed & Bill Wolkoff	August 14, 2025
The USS Farragut is attacked by a large scavenger ship and much of the crew is injured, including Captain V'Rel. The Enterprise arrives to help, with Spock, Chapel, Scotty, and communications officer Nyota Uhura joining acting captain James T. Kirk as his temporary command crew. The Enterprise is captured by the scavengers and the Farragut pursues them. The scavenger ship begins draining the Enterprise's power and cuts off communications; the crew use wired phones from the 20th century and manual controls to get around this, while Pike and La'An disconnect them from the scavenger ship and kill some of the scavengers. Kirk struggles with the pressure of command, but with support from the others he devises a plan to trick the scavengers into temporarily disabling their own ship. As the Enterprise escapes, the Farragut fires into the scavenger ship and destroys it. Both crews are shocked to discover that the scavengers are humans, the descendants of 21st-century scientists who left Earth in the aftermath of World War III. Kirk is haunted by his command decisions and receives advice from Pike.
27	7	"What Is Starfleet?"	Sharon Lewis	Kathryn Lyn & Alan B. McElroy	August 21, 2025
Beto films a documentary about Starfleet while the Enterprise aids the non-Federation planet Lutani VII in its war with neighboring planet Kasar. The Enterprise is ordered to transport a Jikaru, a creature that was altered by the Lutani into a weapon, to the war zone. Beto is aggressive in his questioning of the crew, aiming to portray Starfleet in a negative light. The mission is complicated when a ship of Lutani scientists, who regret the creature's alterations, attack the Jikaru and allow it to escape from the Enterprise. Spock is left in a coma after attempting to communicate with the Jikaru telepathically. Uhura connects with the creature, learning that it is suffering and wishes to be euthanized. Honoring the Jikaru's request, the Enterprise leads it into a star and the Federation offers to protect the Jikaru homeworld so its children will not be similarly altered by the Lutani. Uhura suggests to Beto that he blames Starfleet for his estranged relationship with Ortegas and the injuries she suffered fighting the Gorn. With a new perspective, Beto's documentary ultimately praises Starfleet and its personnel.
28	8	"Four-and-a-Half Vulcans"	Jordan Canning	Dana Horgan & Henry Alonso Myers	August 28, 2025
Pike, Chapel, Uhura, and La'An are transformed into Vulcans for a mission, after which they decide to remain Vulcan. Pike becomes obsessed with efficiency and neatness; Uhura manipulates Beto into accepting a mind meld to improve their compatibility for a potential relationship; Chapel ends all of her friendships and her relationship with Korby to focus on work; and La'An develops Romulan tendencies, becoming a sinister warmonger. At a meeting regarding Batel's request to return from medical leave to her job with the Starfleet Judicial Department, Pike tells Vice Admiral Pasalk that her return would be illogical, and Batel loses her temper with both. Scotty and James Kirk, on leave from the Farragut, become friends while working together to stop La'An. With the help of Number One's Vulcan ex-boyfriend Doug, Spock connects with the four crewmembers' katras (spiritual essence) and persuades them to change back. They make amends for their actions. To Batel's surprise, Pasalk offers her a promotion to head of the Judicial Department following his impending retirement, having been impressed by her outburst.
29	9	"Terrarium"	Andrew Coutts	Alan B. McElroy	September 4, 2025
While flying a shuttle for a mission, Ortegas is pulled through a wormhole and crashes on a barren moon orbiting a gas giant. She is protected from the moon's dangers by a stranded Gorn pilot and, despite Ortegas's initial mistrust, the pair become friends as they survive together and bond over their similarities. The Enterprise has an urgent assignment to deliver vaccines to a colony, limiting the time they can spend searching for Ortegas. Uhura proposes they take the Enterprise partially into the wormhole to find her, and exaggerates the mission's probability of success to convince Pike. Ortegas and the Gorn ignite the moon's atmosphere to signal the Enterprise. Upon transporting down to rescue Ortegas, La'An mistakes the Gorn for an enemy and kills her. An enigmatic being called a Metron appears to Ortegas and explains that they brought her and the Gorn together to see if peace between humans and Gorn is possible. Because of La'An's violent reaction, they believe further study is required. The Metron erases Ortegas's memories of their conversation, but she remembers and mourns for her new friend.
30	10	"New Life and New Civilizations"	Maja Vrvilo	Dana Horgan & Davy Perez	September 11, 2025
As Batel prepares to leave the Enterprise to take up her new role, the crew discover that the Vezda has escaped from the transporter pattern buffer in a reconstruction of Gamble's body. Korby finds Gamble at a doorway to the Vezda prison and the Enterprise goes to rescue him. This is a trap to lure out M'Benga, as he and Gamble need to be together to open the doorway. The crew learn that the unique combination of DNA inside Batel matches the biology of the Beholder statue that guards the prison. To open the doorway without M'Benga and Gamble, the crew devise a plan to simultaneously fire on it from the Enterprise and the Farragut; Spock performs a mind meld with James Kirk so the two can perfectly sync their actions. Pike and Batel enter the prison and confront Gamble, who destroys the Beholder and frees the other Vezda. Using her emerging power, Batel creates an illusion in which she and Pike live a full and happy life together. She then traps all the Vezda in the prison and becomes the Beholder. Pike struggles to move on without Batel as the Enterprise sets out to explore uncharted planets.

== Cast and characters ==
=== Main ===
- Anson Mount as Christopher Pike
- Ethan Peck as Spock
- Jess Bush as Christine Chapel
- Christina Chong as La'An Noonien-Singh
- Celia Rose Gooding as Nyota Uhura
- Melissa Navia as Erica Ortegas
- Babs Olusanmokun as Joseph M'Benga
- Martin Quinn as Montgomery "Scotty" Scott
- Rebecca Romijn as Una Chin-Riley / Number One

=== Recurring ===
- Melanie Scrofano as Marie Batel
- Dan Jeannotte as George Samuel "Sam" Kirk
- Carol Kane as Pelia
- Cillian O'Sullivan as Roger Korby
- Mynor Luken as Umberto "Beto" Ortegas
- Chris Myers as Dana Gamble
- Paul Wesley as James T. Kirk

=== Notable guests ===
- Adrian Holmes as Robert April
- John de Lancie as the voice of Q
- Rhys Darby as Trelane
- Patton Oswalt as Doug

== Production ==
=== Development ===
Executive producer Alex Kurtzman envisioned Star Trek: Strange New Worlds, a spin-off from the series Star Trek: Discovery (2017–2024), as an ongoing series that could cover the seven years between Discovery's second season (2019) and the accident that seriously injures Christopher Pike in Star Trek: The Original Series (1966–1969). Co-showrunner Akiva Goldsman hoped Strange New Worlds would continue until it caught up with the events of The Original Series. In June 2022, when the first season was being released and the second season was in production, co-star Melissa Navia said discussions about a third season had begun. Co-showrunner Henry Alonso Myers said it had not been officially ordered but it was "definitely the next thing in line" and the crew had begun work due to the time needed to complete scripts and prepare the sets and virtual production technology. In August, CBS Entertainment CEO George Cheeks highlighted the first season's success and said they were "just getting started", suggesting the series would continue beyond the second season.

Goldsman revealed in March 2023 that filming for the third season was about to begin, and Paramount+ officially announced the 10-episode season a week later. However, filming was delayed indefinitely when the 2023 Writers Guild of America strike started on May 2. During the Writers Guild strike and the concurrent 2023 SAG-AFTRA strike, producing director Chris Fisher and the series' Toronto-based producers developed a rolling plan to allow production to begin within a few weeks of both strikes ending. Pre-production resumed after the Writers Guild strike ended in September and the SAG-AFTRA strike ended in early November.

=== Writing ===
Goldsman said the series would continue to "genre hop" with each episode in the third season, and the writers had settled on the 10 episode ideas before the Writers Guild strike began in May 2023. The season includes several ideas that could not be used in the second season due to the 10 episodes-per-season limit. Myers said the delay caused by the strikes could lead to some changes being made to their plans, including for how they intended to resolve the second season's cliffhanger ending. The fourth episode is a murder mystery episode.

=== Casting ===
Anson Mount, Ethan Peck, and Rebecca Romijn star in the series as Captain Christopher Pike, science officer Spock, and first officer Una Chin-Riley / Number One, respectively. Also starring are Jess Bush as nurse Christine Chapel, Christina Chong as chief security officer La'An Noonien-Singh, Celia Rose Gooding as Ensign Nyota Uhura, Melissa Navia as helmsman Erica Ortegas, and Babs Olusanmokun as Dr. Joseph M'Benga. Following the introduction of Martin Quinn as engineer Montgomery "Scotty" Scott in the second-season finale, the showrunners said Quinn would return, and he was made a series regular for the third season.

Paul Wesley, who replaced The Original Series star William Shatner as James T. Kirk for the series, said in February 2024 that he would again have a recurring role in the third season. That July, Carol Kane was confirmed to be reprising her role as Pelia from the second season, while Cillian O'Sullivan was announced to have a recurring role as Roger Korby, who was portrayed by Michael Strong in the Original Series episode "What Are Little Girls Made Of?" (1966). O'Sullivan, who is Irish, auditioned for the character using his own accent as well as British and American accents. Despite Strong using his American accent for the role, and O'Sullivan wanting to use a British accent, Goldsman decided that the character should have an Irish accent in Strange New Worlds. O'Sullivan said the updated take on Korby was inspired by Bush's updated take on Chapel and wanting him to be "a good match" for her. In March 2025, Melanie Scrofano was confirmed to be returning in her recurring role as Pike's girlfriend, Captain Marie Batel. Dan Jeannotte also returns as Kirk's brother George Samuel "Sam" Kirk, as does Adrian Holmes as Admiral Robert April. Mynor Luken recurs as Ortegas's younger brother Beto, with Chris Myers as Dana Gamble, a medical ensign who joins the Enterprise.

Rhys Darby was announced in October 2024 to have a guest role during the season. There was speculation about whether he was playing an existing character, including the extradimensional being Trelane who was portrayed by William Campbell in the Original Series episode "The Squire of Gothos" (1967). Darby appears in the second episode, "Wedding Bell Blues", where his character is not named. John de Lancie, who portrayed the extradimensional being Q in previous Star Trek media, has a voice-only guest role as the father of Darby's character. The showrunners confirmed off-screen that the pair were portraying Trelane and Q, respectively. Due to the similarities between the two characters, some Star Trek fans had decided as headcanon that Trelane is a member of the Q Continuum and the child of de Lancie's Q. These ideas were also explored by Peter David in the non-canon novel Q-Squared (1994). Goldsman said they wanted to "reward that brilliant thinking" by depicting the connection in official Star Trek canon. They considered Darby for the role after seeing him in the 18th century-set series Our Flag Means Death (2022–23), which has similar costumes to what Trelane wears in The Original Series. Myers said the actor brought a different, contemporary approach to the character, including using his own New Zealand accent, and had "such a flair" that suited the role. The character's name is not spoken in the episode because several of the main characters do not learn it until the events of "The Squire of Gothos".

In April 2025, Patton Oswalt was revealed to be another guest star for the season; he previously had a brief voice role in the series Star Trek: Picard (2020–2023). He portrays a Vulcan named Doug. Additionally, Rong Fu returns as operations officer Jenna Mitchell, and Alex Kapp again provides the voice of the Enterprise's computer.

=== Design ===
Pre-production work designing for the series' virtual production technology, which is used to display digital backgrounds on an LED video wall during filming, had been completed for the first seven episodes when production was delayed by the Writers Guild strike. Fisher said the crew had become confident with using the technology during the second season and would use it for every episode of the third. A new science lab set was built for the season that has a transparent floor, revealing a pool of swirling water under the central workbench. An updated version of the orange hazmat suits worn in The Original Series was made for the season, 3D printed from silicon.

=== Filming ===
Before the Writers Guild strike began, filming was expected to take place from May 2 to December 30, 2023, at CBS Stages Canada in Mississauga, Ontario. Fisher had storyboarded the first episode and the cast was one day away from flying to Canada for filming when production was delayed. Cast and crew began moving to Toronto when pre-production restarted on November 13, after the strikes ended.

Filming began on December 11, 2023, with Fisher directing the first episode. Following a break for the Christmas and New Years holidays, filming resumed in the second week of January. Filming for the second episode, directed by Jordan Canning, ended on January 24. Dan Liu also directed an episode. Frequent Star Trek director Jonathan Frakes helmed the fourth episode, and was filming it in early February. He felt it was the best television episode that he had directed. Location filming for the fifth episode, directed by Andi Armaganian, took place at Lafarge Quarry outside Toronto. Valerie Weiss started directing an episode on March 7, and Sharon Lewis directed the seventh episode which was filmed from March 20 to April 10. Canning returned to direct the eighth episode, which completed filming by April 25. Andrew Coutts, an editor on the series, made his directorial debut with the ninth episode which had begun filming by then, while Maja Vrvilo was preparing to direct the season finale. Filming for the finale episode was completed in May along with additional filming for earlier episodes. Frakes returned for additional filming on his episode in the week of May 13. Mount announced that filming for the season wrapped on May 24.

=== Music ===
A soundtrack album featuring selections from composer Nami Melumad's score for the season was released digitally by Lakeshore Records on November 7, 2025. All music by Nami Melumad:

Original Series Soundtrack – Season 3
No.	Title	Length
1.	"Doug Sees, Doug Does"	3:14
2.	"Enterprise to the Occasion"	2:59
3.	"Gorn Fishing"	4:15
4.	"La'an and Order"	2:18
5.	"Enterprise and Shine"	2:02
6.	"The Chapel of Your Eye"	1:12
7.	"Stay in Your Tarlene"	1:00
8.	"Agornophobia"	2:16
9.	"The Show Must Gorn On"	1:59
10.	"Mansion Impossible"	1:40
11.	"Cute as Apple Pike"	1:59
12.	"Spill the Purmantea"	1:17
13.	"Four and a Half Vulcans"	1:33
14.	"Follow My Treks"	2:19
15.	"Meet Qt"	1:06
16.	"Best Foot Forward"	2:11
17.	"No Enterprising Options"	3:07
18.	"Kling On to the Past"	1:53
19.	"Lab Is Life, Life Is Lab"	1:52
20.	"Today Is a Good Day to Fly"	1:40
21.	"The First Rule About Flight Club"	1:43
22.	"Since You've Been Gorn"	1:33
23.	"Vulcan Mission Go"	1:49
24.	"Cell Block Quantum Tango"	1:26
25.	"This Is Starflute, Cello and Guitar"	2:12
26.	"The Spocking Gun"	2:03
27.	"Korby Your Enthusiasm"	1:24
28.	"Keep the Lead On"	1:36
29.	"The Last Frontier"	2:38
30.	"Can't Batel Your Fate"	1:52
31.	"That's the Way the Kirkie Crumbles"	2:56
32.	"Life Gorns On"	1:59
33.	"Saved by the Batel"	2:09
34.	"A Wolf in Ship's Clothing"	1:06
35.	"Agree"	2:52
36.	"The Skygowan is the Limit"	1:38
37.	"To Be or Not Zombie?"	1:46
38.	"Spock and Circumstance"	1:28
39.	"Looking for Friends in All the Gorn Places"	1:15
40.	"Fancy Flying"	1:22
41.	"Disagree"	3:12
42.	"Something Ancient"	1:28
43.	"Temple Run"	2:25
44.	"Will You Marie Me?"	5:16
45.	"The Next Adventure"	1:48
Total length:		1:32:48

== Marketing ==
Kurtzman, Goldsman, Myers, Romijn, and Peck promoted the season during a "Star Trek Universe" panel at San Diego Comic-Con (SDCC) in July 2024. A first-look clip from the season was shown and O'Sullivan's casting was announced. Gizmodo listed the series as one of five "losers" at the convention, criticizing the comedic clip that was shown as an awkward first impression of the season. Goldsman, Myers, Peck, and Kane promoted the season during another "Star Trek Universe" panel in October, at New York Comic Con, where another clip was shown and Darby's casting was announced. Writing for Gizmodo, James Whitbrook was more positive about this clip which is action-focused and follows on from the second season's cliffhanger ending. The next month, Mount and Peck discussed the season during a panel at the ST–NJ: Trek to New Jersey fan convention.

A series of character posters for the main and recurring cast were released in March 2025. These were created by photographer Pari Dukovic, who "amplified the actor's skin and eyes" with projections of different astronomical imagery. The actors were photographed in a dark room with a strobe light and a standard projector. A teaser for the season was released at the start of April. It features a slide projector-inspired effect for cutting between different scenes. Commentators highlighted looks at an Agatha Christie-style murder mystery episode, an episode done in the 1960s style of The Original Series, and the appearance of Oswalt as a guest star. Writing for IndieWire, Christian Blauvelt felt the season looked like a "blast" and said it was continuing what fans loved about the series with the different genres. /Film's Jeremy Mathai said the teaser was "light on plot, but it's certainly heavy on tone and hijinks" and felt the series was looking "zanier than ever". Some commentators questioned the appearance of a holodeck, which was not invented until after The Original Series ended.

Peck, Mount, and Gooding appear in-character in a commercial for Paramount+ that serves as a crossover between Strange New Worlds and the animated series SpongeBob SquarePants (1999–present). The commercial, which was released in April 2025, was filmed on the Strange New Worlds sets. A full trailer and more character posters were released in June. Ray Flook at Bleeding Cool appreciated the poster's "painted retro 'old-school sci-fi paperback' style". The season's world premiere was held at the Tribeca Festival later in June, followed by a discussion with Mount, Peck, Gooding, Kane, Olusanmokun, Kurtzman, Goldsman, and Myers. Kurtzman, Goldsman, Myers, Romijn, Peck, Bush, Chong, and Wesley promoted the season during an SDCC "Star Trek Universe" panel in July 2025, where "A Space Adventure Hour" was shown ahead of its Paramount+ debut.

== Release ==
=== Streaming ===
The season was released on the streaming service Paramount+ in the United States, Canada, the United Kingdom, Latin America, Australia, Italy, France, Germany, Switzerland, Austria, and Japan. It premiered on July 17, 2025, with its first two episodes. The rest of the 10-episode run was released weekly until September 11. "A Space Adventure Hour", which was released on July 31, was made available for free for a week on Paramount+, Pluto TV, and YouTube. The series is released in New Zealand on TVNZ, in India on Voot, and in other European countries on SkyShowtime (a combination of Paramount+ and the streaming service Peacock).

=== Home media ===
The season was released on DVD, Blu-Ray, and Limited Edition Steelbook formats in the US on March 3, 2026. The release includes over three hours of bonus features, including deleted and extended scenes, gag reels, Navia's "personal log", and featurettes on the making of the season, its virtual production, and the visual effects. The Steelbook format features the season's character posters and includes collectible stickers.

== Reception ==
=== Critical response ===
Based primarily on early reviews, review aggregator website Rotten Tomatoes reported that 88% of 39 critics reviews were positive and the average of rated reviews was 7.6 out of 10. The critics consensus reads, "Still a bright beacon in the Star Trek universe, Strange New Worlds's third season makes up for its lack of narrative ambition with gleaming execution." Metacritic, which uses a weighted average, assigned a score of 75 out of 100 based on 11 reviews, indicating a "generally favorable" response. Responses were less positive by the end of the season, with critics describing it as tonally uneven and a step down from the previous two seasons.

=== Accolades ===
Several cast members were named honorable mentions for TVLine's "Performer of the Week": Peck for "Wedding Bell Blues", Mount for "Shuttle to Kenfori", Navia for "Terrarium", and Scrofano for "New Life and New Civilizations". At the end of the year, the series was named on best television series lists for 2025 by Inverse (12th), Den of Geek (21st), and Time Out (25th).

Accolades received by the third season of Star Trek: Strange New Worlds
Award	Date of ceremony	Category	Recipient(s)	Result	Ref.
Saturn Awards	March 8, 2026	Best Science Fiction Television Series	Star Trek: Strange New Worlds	Nominated	
Saturn Awards	March 8, 2026	Best Supporting Actor in a Television Series	Ethan Peck	Nominated	
Saturn Awards	March 8, 2026	Best Supporting Actress in a Television Series	Christina Chong	Nominated	
Saturn Awards	March 8, 2026	Best Guest Star in a Television Series	Paul Wesley	Nominated	
