= Subspace Rhapsody =

- Star Trek: Strange New Worlds episode
- Promotional poster inspired by those for classic Hollywood musical films
- Episode no.: Season 2 Episode 9
- Directed by: Dermott Downs
- Written by: Dana Horgan; Bill Wolkoff
- Cinematography by: Benji Bakshi
- Editing by: John Wesley Whitton
- Original release date: August 3, 2023
- Running time: 63 minutes

Guest appearances
- Paul Wesley as James T. Kirk; Melanie Scrofano as Marie Batel; Dan Jeannotte as Sam Kirk; Bruce Horak as Garkog; Carol Kane as Pelia

Episode chronology
← Previous "Under the Cloak of War"	Next → "Hegemony"
- Star Trek: Strange New Worlds season 2

"Subspace Rhapsody" is the ninth episode of the second season of the American television series Star Trek: Strange New Worlds. The series follows Captain Christopher Pike and the crew of the starship Enterprise in the 23rd century as they explore new worlds and carry out missions during the decade before Star Trek: The Original Series (1966–1969). In the episode, an anomaly makes the crew sing like characters in a musical film. It was written by Dana Horgan and Bill Wolkoff, and directed by Dermott Downs.

Anson Mount, Ethan Peck, and Rebecca Romijn respectively star as Pike, Spock, and Number One, along with Jess Bush, Christina Chong, Celia Rose Gooding, Melissa Navia, and Babs Olusanmokun. The second season of Strange New Worlds was announced in January 2022. It was revealed to have a musical episode that July, a first for the Star Trek franchise, with original songs by Tom Polce and Kay Hanley of the band Letters to Cleo. Downs worked with choreographer Roberto Campanella and other crew members to design the musical sequences. The creative team aspired to match the quality of "Once More, with Feeling", the musical episode from the television series Buffy the Vampire Slayer (1997–2003).

"Subspace Rhapsody" premiered on the streaming service Paramount+ on August 3, 2023. It was estimated to have high viewership and audience demand, and was positively received by critics for the way the musical aspects are used to explore the season's major character arcs, for the strength of the songs and how they use the different singing abilities of each cast member—with particular praise for Gooding—and for key moments such as an interlude with singing Klingons. The episode was nominated for a Hugo Award.

== Plot ==
James T. Kirk, recently promoted to executive officer of the USS Farragut, visits the USS Enterprise to shadow Number One. While conducting communications experiments with a mysterious "subspace fold", Ensign Nyota Uhura broadcasts a recording of the song "Anything Goes" into it. The fold produces an "improbability field" that causes science officer Spock, and then the rest of the Enterprise crew, to begin singing about feelings like characters in a musical film (singing the song "Status Report").

Number One and Kirk sing a duet in which she advises him to be true to himself ("Connect to Your Truth"). Chief security officer La'An Noonien-Singh, who had a relationship with an alternate version of Kirk during a time travel adventure, (Note: As depicted in the episode "Tomorrow and Tomorrow and Tomorrow") sees this and sings about potentially opening up about her feelings for Kirk ("How Would That Feel"). She tells Captain Christopher Pike that the improbability field represents a security risk. Pike is unconcerned until he and his girlfriend, Captain Marie Batel, sing about their relationship in front of the crew ("Private Conversation"). Number One later sings to La'An, warning her about keeping secrets and encouraging her to be open with Kirk ("Keeping Secrets").

Spock and Uhura try to provoke a singing incident so they can analyze it. They see nurse Christine Chapel celebrating at the Enterprise's bar, as she has been accepted to a prestigious research fellowship off the ship. Spock, who has been in a relationship with Chapel, asks her why she did not inform him of this, and she reveals in song that she has decided to prioritize the fellowship over their relationship ("I'm Ready"). Spock later sings to Uhura about the end of his relationship with Chapel ("I'm the X"). After Spock leaves, Uhura is left alone and sings about her personal loneliness as well as her role in bringing the ship together as communications officer ("Keep Us Connected").

La'An voluntarily confesses her feelings to Kirk, but he reveals that he is in a relationship with Carol Marcus, who is pregnant. After analyzing the most recent songs, Uhura determines that an upbeat grand finale will provide enough energy to close the improbability field. She encourages the crew to sing about the fulfillment they find in working together, briefly interrupted by a ship of Klingons who sing about how they dream of killing Starfleet personnel ("We Are One"). When the song concludes, the improbability field dissipates.

== Production ==
=== Development ===
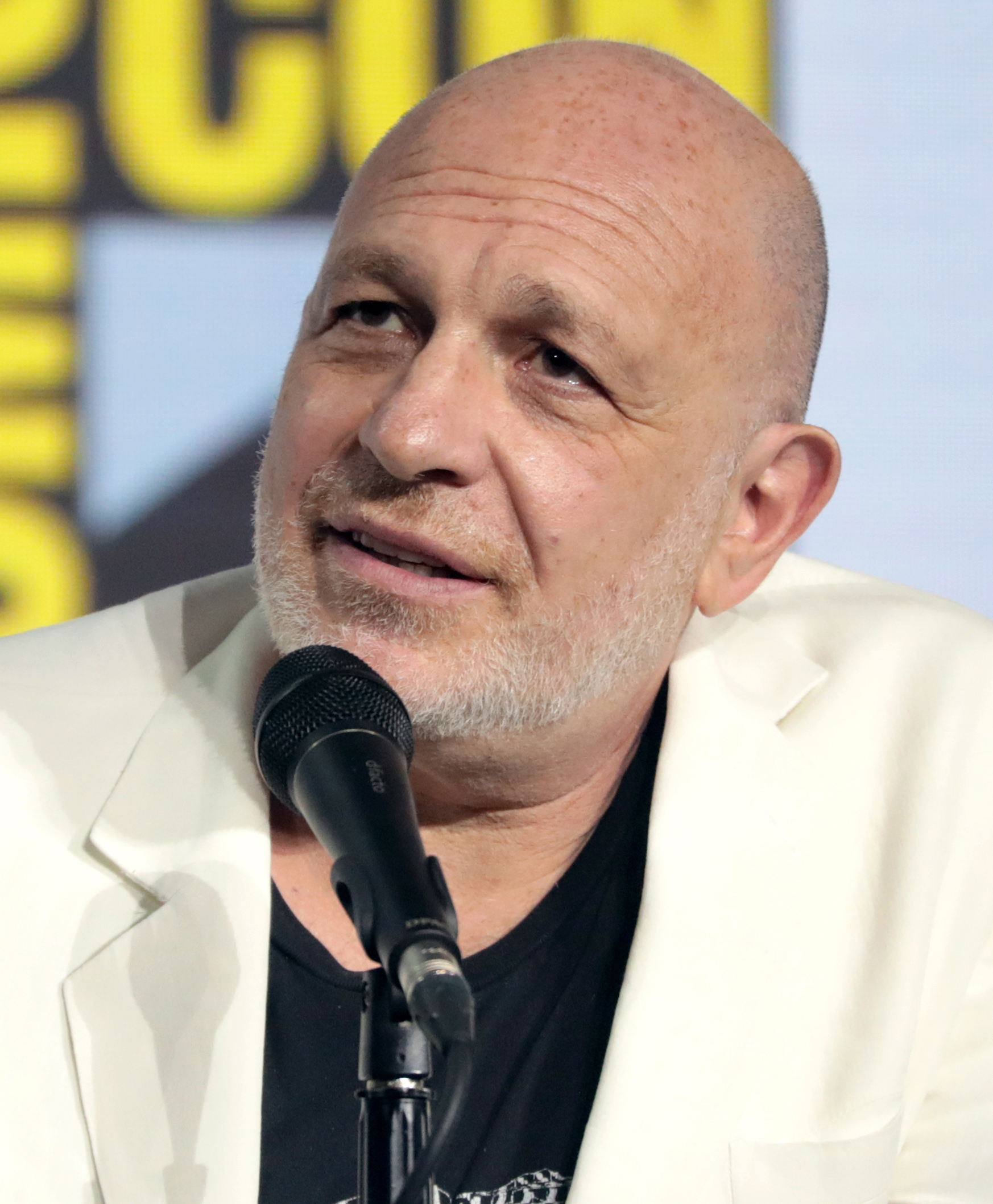
Co-showrunner Akiva Goldsman began pushing for a Star Trek musical episode while working on a different series, Star Trek: Picard.

Executive producer Alex Kurtzman envisioned Star Trek: Strange New Worlds, a spin-off from the series Star Trek: Discovery (2017–2024), as an ongoing series that could cover the seven years between Discovery's second season (2019) and the accident that seriously injures Christopher Pike in Star Trek: The Original Series (1966–1969). Paramount+ announced a second season in January 2022, ahead of the first season's release. Showrunners Henry Alonso Myers and Akiva Goldsman committed to the first season's episodic structure and said they would "go for broke" in differentiating the second season's episodes with unique genres. Goldsman said it would have some "creative stretches" and "big swings" that had not been seen in Star Trek before.

Kurtzman first discussed the potential for a Star Trek musical episode in July 2020, believing the idea could be explored as part of the companion series Star Trek: Short Treks (2018–2020). While working on the series Star Trek: Picard (2020–2023), Goldsman unsuccessfully attempted to pursue a musical episode after learning that showrunner Michael Chabon knew songwriter Lin-Manuel Miranda. When he moved to working on Strange New Worlds with Myers, who previously worked on musical episodes for the series Ugly Betty (2006–2010) and The Magicians (2015–2020), Goldsman again began pursuing a potential musical episode. Myers thought it was too early to do one in the first season, but agreed for the second season after writer Bill Wolkoff pitched a "crazy idea" for such an episode that Myers thought was interesting. Goldsman admitted that he did not know anything about making a musical despite being a fan of the genre. Myers knew how difficult a musical episode could be based on his prior experiences and began making calls to prospective songwriters around six months before production on the episode started.

In January 2023, star Anson Mount teased that the second season had an episode even crazier than "Those Old Scientists", the previously announced crossover with the animated comedy series Star Trek: Lower Decks (2020–2024). He said this episode required the cast to rehearse on weekends and they had all been excited to do so. His comments led to speculation that the season had a musical episode. John Orquiola at Screen Rant believed a full musical episode was inevitable after the musical moments in the first-season episode "Children of the Comet", which featured the characters Nyota Uhura and Spock singing. In July 2023, "Subspace Rhapsody" was announced at San Diego Comic-Con as the first full music episode in the Star Trek franchise. It was written by Dana Horgan and Wolkoff, and directed by Dermott Downs. Downs previously directed "Duet", the musical episode of the television series The Flash (2014–2023).

=== Writing ===
The writers of Strange New Worlds first settle on the character arcs for the full season before breaking down the plot and style of each individual episode, so when work on the penultimate ninth episode began they knew where the characters were coming from, what they had to go through, and where they were going next. They planned for all of the season's character arcs to culminate in the episode, and when the idea of doing it as a musical was suggested Myers felt that "went hand in hand" with the character plans. Goldsman said, "we decided it would also be a musical and, in a weird way, that made it better. We had obligations to these character stories. And they were gonna sing it!" Wolkoff's pitch for the episode was that the USS Enterprise (NCC-1701) would encounter an "improbability field" which creates a reality where the characters are compelled to sing about their feelings. Myers said his primary contribution to the episode was reminding the creative team that audiences would expect a Star Trek musical to be silly, but he wanted it to make them cry and be about real character drama.

The creative team aspired to match "Once More, with Feeling", the musical episode from the television series Buffy the Vampire Slayer (1997–2003). Myers felt that was one of the best musical episodes, calling it "really smart and thoughtful. It has big heart." The episode includes a line about bunnies as a reference to "Once More, with Feeling". Unlike that episode, the writers did not try to create the songs themselves; Tom Polce and Kay Hanley of the band Letters to Cleo were hired to write original songs. The writers gave the initial concept to the songwriters, and there was a back-and-forth between the two pairs as they developed ideas. Myers said the Strange New Worlds team were trying to make the episode feel like a true musical while the songwriters were trying to make it feel like a true episode of Strange New Worlds. He believed they came to a "great place in the middle".

One of the big character moments planned for the episode is between Spock and Christine Chapel, who are in a romantic relationship in the season but are destined to go down different paths. This is handled through back-to-back songs in which Chapel sings about deciding to leave the Enterprise and Spock sings about the end of their relationship. Spock star Ethan Peck said this moment could, in part, lead to the less emotional version of Spock seen in The Original Series. Another big character moment comes when Uhura sings about her role on the ship, solidifying her character development from an unsure cadet to a permanent member of the bridge crew. Also in the episode, James T. Kirk reveals that he is in a "complicated relationship" with a pregnant woman named Carol. This is a reference to Carol Marcus and their son David from the film Star Trek II: The Wrath of Khan (1982). The showrunners thought the series gave them a good opportunity to explore this stage of Kirk's love life, and they "[did] the math" to ensure the timeline would work for David's age in The Wrath of Khan.

=== Casting ===
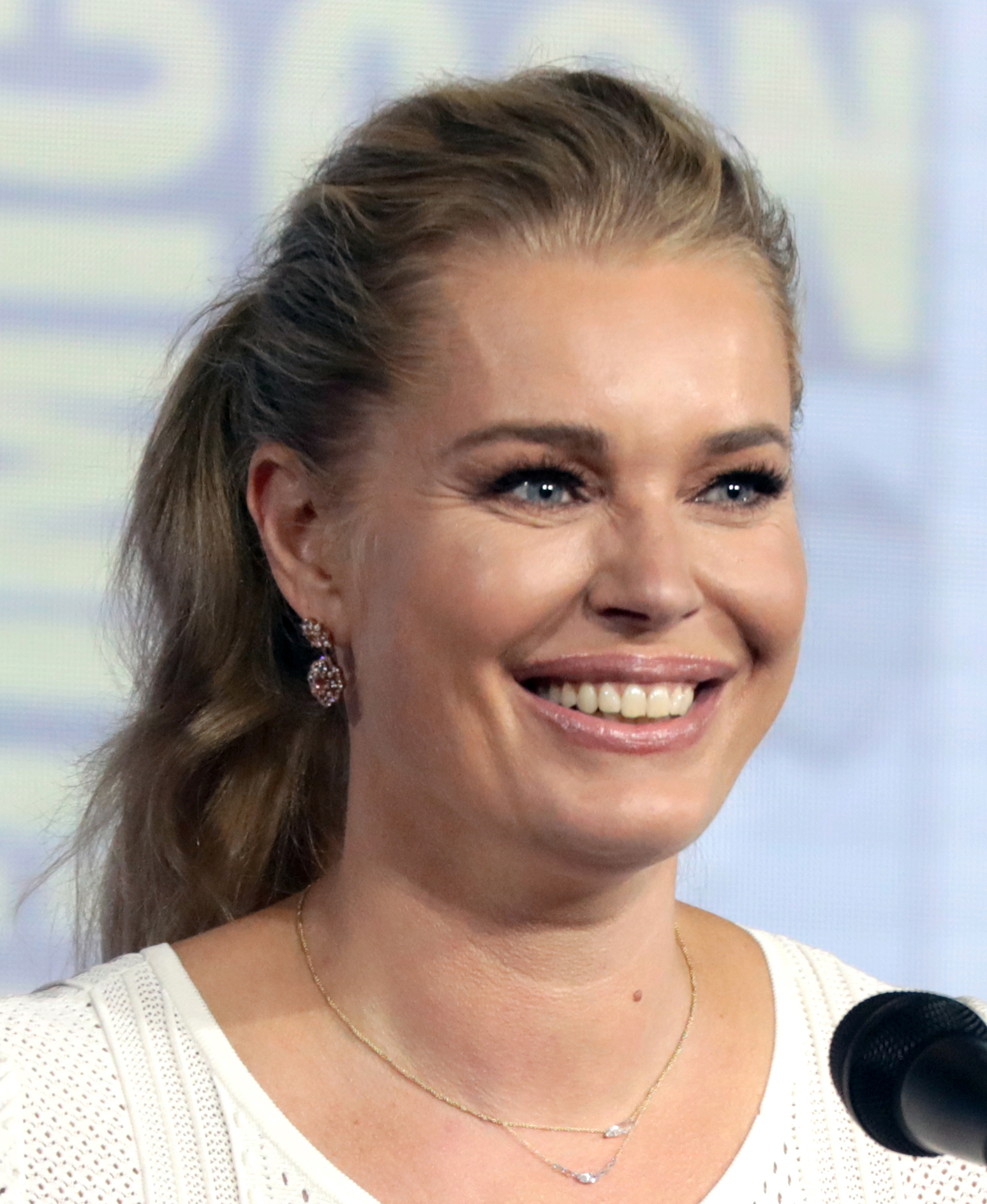
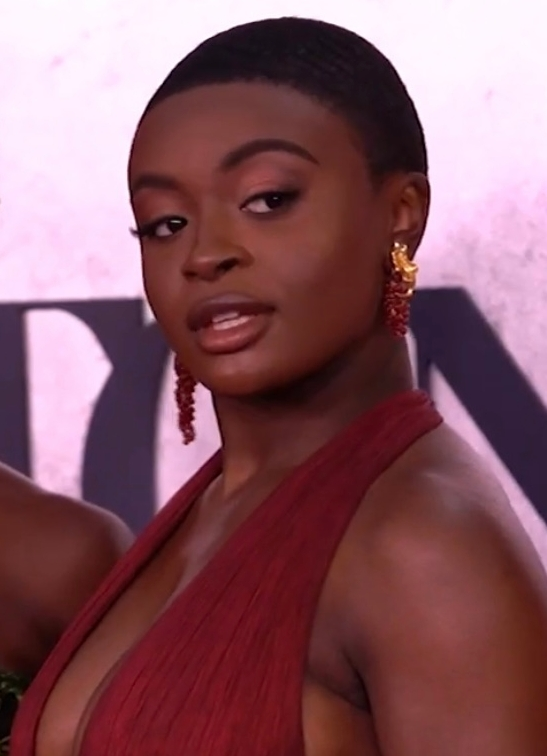
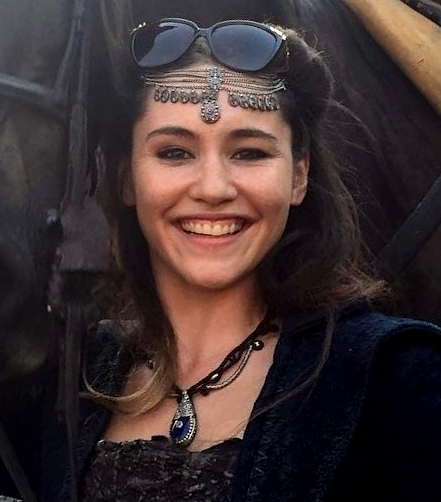
Cast members Rebecca Romijn, Celia Rose Gooding, and Christina Chong were all established singers before working on the episode.

Anson Mount, Ethan Peck, and Rebecca Romijn star in the series as Captain Christopher Pike, science officer Spock, and first officer Una Chin-Riley / Number One, respectively. Also starring are Jess Bush as nurse Christine Chapel, Christina Chong as chief security officer La'An Noonien-Singh, Celia Rose Gooding as Ensign Nyota Uhura, Melissa Navia as helmsman Erica Ortegas, and Babs Olusanmokun as Dr. Joseph M'Benga.

Appearing in their recurring guest roles are Paul Wesley as James T. Kirk, Melanie Scrofano as Marie Batel, Dan Jeannotte as George Samuel "Sam" Kirk, and Carol Kane as Pelia. Bruce Horak, who starred as chief engineer Hemmer in the first season, said the death of his character would not be the end of his involvement in the series; he returned as Hemmer for a guest role in the second season, and also guest stars in "Subspace Rhapsody" as the Klingon General Garkog. The showrunners said they loved working with Horak and wanted to find a fun way to bring him back again.

=== Filming and editing ===
Cinematographer Benji Bakshi, who brought his own musical background as a cellist, said discussions about how to approach the episode started during his interviews for the season. Downs began work on the episode two weeks before the normal preparation period, giving him extra time to plan each musical sequence with choreographer Roberto Campanella. The pair worked with temp versions of the songs during the initial planning. Downs wanted the different characters' stories and the styles of the songs to inform his visual approach to each sequence. Campanella read the script for the previous episode to understand the characters, and was sent video references for the dances by the writers. He included a reference to the musical West Side Story (1957) in the final song, when dancers run toward the camera, but otherwise tried to avoid direct references in his choreography and instead focused on movements that felt natural to the characters.

Filming for the season began in February 2022 at CBS Stages Canada in Mississauga, Ontario. The cast learned their songs and dance choreography during production on earlier episodes, including on weekends. The first season premiered shortly after Downs completed preparation for "Subspace Rhapsody", and he said positive responses to it gave new energy to the cast as they neared the end of a long production schedule. The series' directors were encouraged to bring a unique look and tone to each episode to highlight its episodic approach. Inspired by previous musicals, Downs wanted to film with more wide shots than other episodes of Strange New Worlds, showing more of the actors than close-ups allow. He was concerned about the episode "jumping the shark", but found the cast and the central story idea kept it grounded in the Star Trek franchise. The actors recorded the songs ahead of filming for them to lip sync to. Myers said filming the episode was not as hard as expected due to the months of preparation. Filming for the second season wrapped on July 1.

Number One and Kirk have a "Waltz of the First Officers" in their song which Polce said was "our one hat-tip to old-school musicals". This took advantage of Wesley's experience with ballroom dancing. Set restrictions forced a zero gravity sequence between Number One and La'An to be pared back from Downs's initial vision, which included movements inspired by the film Crouching Tiger, Hidden Dragon (2000) that he said "might have been too much". Romijn and Chong were filmed in harnesses for the scene. The dance sequence in Chapel's song "I'm Ready" originally had only a few dancers, but this was expanded to nearly 20 at Downs's request. Campanella choreographed them around the ship's bar with trust falls and crowd surfing. Bakshi used flashing lights and moving cameras for the sequence, as well as a "pretty intricately" planned overhead shot of Chapel as she is crowd surfing and spinning. The Klingons are seen on the Enterprise's viewscreen, limiting how much of them could be shown. The Klingon captain's chair was rigged so it could move backwards to make more room.

The one song that Downs was concerned about filming on the Enterprise sets was La'An's big emotional song, "How Would That Feel", which mostly takes place in La'An's quarters. He worked with Chong to make the most of the different parts of the room as well as its windows, which look out to space. Bakshi wanted to capture a "womb-like presentation" for the sequence. Campanella was excited to choreograph for Chong, but after hearing the music and lyrics for "How Would That Feel" he decided that dancing would be inappropriate. Downs conceived a moment for the sequence where La'An imagines herself in a field with Kirk, filmed in the style of Terrence Malick's films. Producing director Chris Fisher suggested they film a different imagination sequence in the hotel room that La'An and Kirk share in the episode "Tomorrow and Tomorrow and Tomorrow", since pick-up shots for that episode were being filmed around the same time as "Subspace Rhapsody". Downs was reluctant to make the change, but ultimately felt that the hotel version was "intimate and magical and romantic".

Based on his experience working in episodic television, Downs expected the episode to be cut down to around 40 minutes in length. However, very little was cut from the episode to give it a final "supersized" length of just over 60 minutes. Downs attributed this to the series' writers and said they were "running a great ship". "Keeping Secrets" is the one song that was cut down for time. Editor John Wesley Whitton had not worked on a musical before. He wanted to avoid the quick cuts of some modern musicals to fit the bigger, more fantastical style of Strange New Worlds, and focused on the wide shots that showed the sets and choreography. Each song has a different style of editing to match the different musical styles, which was driven by the music and by Downs's directing style rather than intentional style changes in Whitton's editing.

=== Music ===
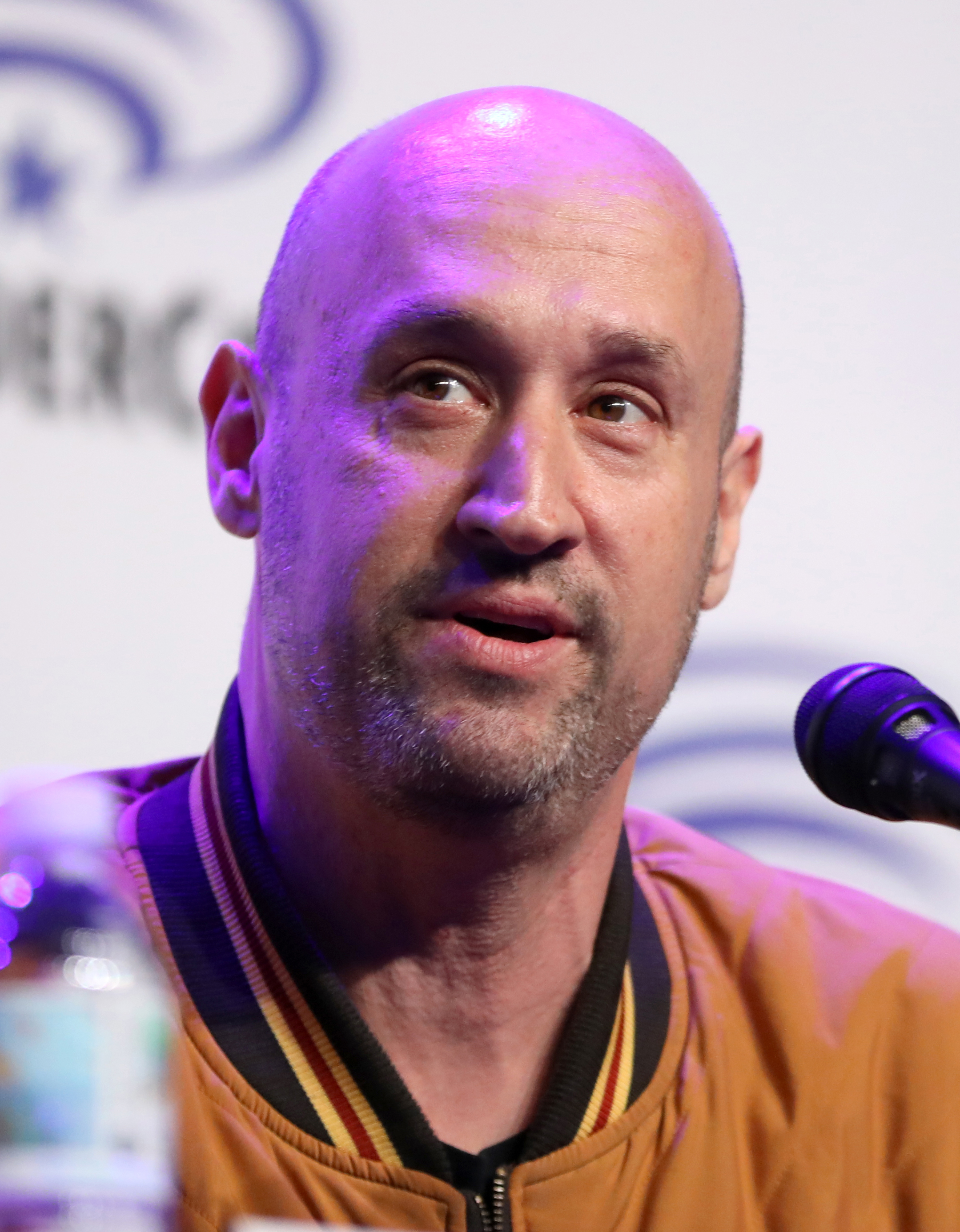
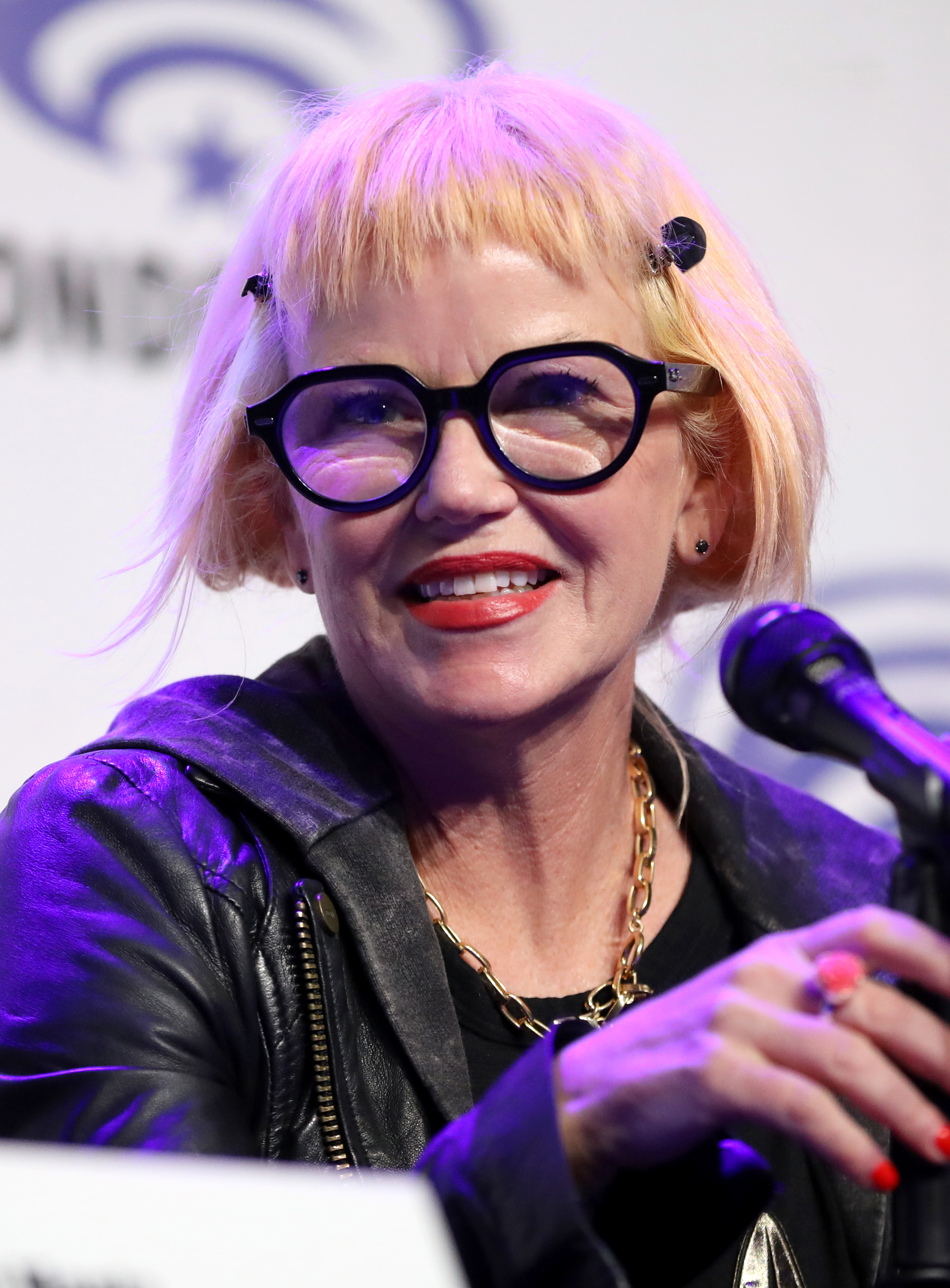
Tom Polce and Kay Hanley of the band Letters to Cleo wrote the original songs for the episode.

Polce wrote the music for the songs and Hanley wrote the lyrics. Before they started, Polce went to Toronto to record the cast singing so the songwriters knew what each of their vocal ranges was. Romijn, Gooding, and Chong were all established singers. The showrunners were surprised by how well the rest of the cast could sing, including Peck, who was not confident he would be able to sing well. Mount was also apprehensive to sing. Downs encouraged him to focus on the performance, and suggested he take inspiration from Star Trek star William Shatner's spoken word rendition of Elton John's song "Rocket Man" (1972) at the 1978 Saturn Awards. Gooding was excited to bring her experience in musical theatre, while Chong had been asking the showrunners to make a musical episode and attributed it to her "persistent nagging". Vocal lessons were provided for one or two months to the actors who needed them, and they had the option to re-record vocals after filming if they were not happy with the on-set version.

The writers explained what needed to be revealed about the characters in each song and then told Polce and Hanley to have fun with how to do that. The opening song, "Status Report", has the most "treknobabble" of all the songs and required close collaboration with the writers. Horgan compared it to the opening numbers of musicals Into the Woods (1986) and Newsies (1992). "Connect to Your Truth", which Number One sings with Kirk, is an homage to the songs of Gilbert and Sullivan. Number One's love of Gilbert and Sullivan songs was previously established in the Short Treks episode "Q&A" (2019). Hanley felt "Connect to Your Truth" only worked because Romijn had the "vocal and comedy chops" to pull off a Gilbert and Sullivan-style song. The writers were inspired for "How Would That Feel", in which La'An sings about her secret feelings for an alternate version of Kirk, by the songs "Defying Gravity" and "On My Own" from the musicals Wicked (2003) and Les Misérables (1980), respectively.

Chapel's song "I'm Ready" was written with a simple melody to match with Bush's more limited vocal range, which Hanley said was similar to her own. Wolkoff described it as a "freeing song" similar to "I Got Life" from the musical Hair (1967). It includes a dance break which Polce added after watching the film Grease (1978). Polce gave "I'm Ready" and Spock's song "I'm the X" the same melody but different tones, making "a song of pure joy for Chapel [and] a torch song for Spock". On approaching a break-up song for the logically-minded Spock, Hanley said the key moment was deciding to use a mathematical metaphor where Spock sings about searching for the y variable and him being the x variable in an emotional equation. For "Keep Us Connected", Uhura's song about loss and her role on the Enterprise, Hanley said she had an out of body experience and cried while writing it which was a first in her career. The writers gave her details on Uhura's backstory, such as the deaths of her family, which inspired the song. The final song, "We Are One", was challenging in that Hanley had to fit in a line for every character talking about their role on the ship. This song includes an interlude with the Klingons, which the writers intended to be an opera song. Hanley suggested the Klingons be in a K-pop style boy band instead, an idea that the showrunners enjoyed. Both versions of the Klingon scene were filmed, and Goldsman said there was contention over which to use. The showrunners liked the opera song, which aligns with the Klingon's history in the franchise, but they chose to use the boy band version because it "knocked [them] out" and they thought it would take the audience by surprise. It also differentiated the moment more from the other styles of music in the episode.

When Myers told main theme composer Jeff Russo that they were making a musical episode, Russo's first thought was to make an a cappella version of the theme. He ultimately arranged a new version that combines a cappella-style vocals with an orchestra. He said this was "so incredible to make". When the musical reality dissipates at the end of the episode, a rendition of Alexander Courage's original Star Trek theme is heard.

A soundtrack album for the episode was released digitally by Lakeshore Records on August 4, 2023. It features the original songs, Russo's new main theme arrangement, and a music-only medley of the songs which is heard during the end credits. The album became the number one album and number one soundtrack on iTunes within three days of its release, and several of its songs charted in the top 25 on the platform: "Status Report" (13th), "I'm Ready" (19th), "Keep Us Connected" (20th), "How Would That Feel" (22nd), and "I'm The X" (23rd). Two weeks later, the album debuted in 14th place on Billboard's soundtracks chart. The album was released on black vinyl by Lakeshore Records on June 7, 2024. The release features artwork based on the episode's promotional poster. All music is composed by Tom Polce and Kay Hanley, except where noted:

Subspace Rhapsody (Original Series Soundtrack)
No.	Title	Music	Vocals	Length
1.	"Star Trek Strange New Worlds Main Title (Subspace Rhapsody Version)"	Jeff Russo		1:51
2.	"Status Report"		Anson Mount, Jess Bush, Christina Chong, Rebecca Romijn, Ethan Peck, Melissa Navia, Celia Rose Gooding, Babs Olusanmokun, Paul Wesley, and Carol Kane	2:56
3.	"Connect to Your Truth"		Rebecca Romijn and Paul Wesley	1:51
4.	"How Would That Feel"		Christina Chong	4:25
5.	"Private Conversation"		Anson Mount and Melanie Scrofano	1:29
6.	"Keeping Secrets"		Rebecca Romijn	4:11
7.	"I'm Ready"		Jess Bush, Celia Rose Gooding, Melissa Navia, and Dan Jeannotte	2:37
8.	"I'm the X"		Ethan Peck	2:25
9.	"Keep Us Connected"		Celia Rose Gooding	4:30
10.	"We Are One"		Anson Mount, Jess Bush, Christina Chong, Rebecca Romijn, Ethan Peck, Melissa Navia, Celia Rose Gooding, Babs Olusanmokun, Dan Jeannotte, Paul Wesley, and Carol Kane	4:17
11.	"Subspace Rhapsody End Credit Medley"			1:38
Total length:				32:13

== Release ==
The ninth episode of Strange New Worlds's second season was originally expected to be released on August 10, 2023, on the streaming service Paramount+ in the United States and other countries where the service is available. However, the seventh episode was released early following the series' San Diego Comic-Con panel and the season's remaining episodes were subsequently each moved up a week. "Subspace Rhapsody" was therefore released on August 3. The episode, along with the rest of the second season, was released on DVD, Blu-Ray, and Limited Edition Steelbook formats in the US on December 5, 2023. A sing-along screening of "Subspace Rhapsody" was held at WonderCon in March 2024, followed by a discussion panel with Polce and Hanley, and another sing-along was held during the IGN Live fan event that June.

== Reception ==
=== Viewership ===
Whip Media, which tracks viewership data for the 19 million worldwide users of its TV Time app, ranked Strange New Worlds as the most watched original streaming series for US viewership during the week ending August 6, 2023. This was an increase from third place the previous week. Nielsen Media Research records streaming viewership on US television screens, and estimated that Strange New Worlds was the seventh-most watched original streaming series for the week ending August 6 with 362 million minutes watched. Strange New Worlds did not make it onto JustWatch's list of top 10 streaming series for that week.

=== Critical response ===
On review aggregator website Rotten Tomatoes, 100% of 9 critics reviews for the episode were positive and the average of rated reviews was 9.8 out of 10.

Wilson Chapman of IndieWire praised "Subspace Rhapsody" as the best musical episode since "Once More, with Feeling", specifically because, like that episode, it used its songs to reveal the characters' inner truths and efficiently progress all of the season's arcs and subplots. James Whitbrook at Gizmodo called it a "glorious triumph", deeming it to be a good musical and a good episode of Star Trek. He said it was bold for the creative team to resolve the season's main character arcs in what could be seen as a silly episode, and even more bold to not give happy endings to those subplots. Writing for Vulture, Sophie Brookover gave the episode five stars out of five and said the writers "did not have to go so hard" in creating a musical that also had an "elegant weave" of character arcs and thematic threads. Rob Owen, writing for the Pittsburgh Tribune-Review, said Strange New Worlds was the ideal choice out of the modern Star Trek series to get a musical episode due to its flexibility, and because of its established connections between the crew. Graeme Virtue at The Guardian called the episode "slightly cheesy [and] very self-indulgent... but it is also heartfelt, in keeping with the show's unfashionably optimistic outlook". Lacy Baugher also said the episode was "silly, heartfelt, and perhaps the most fun the show's ever been" and praised the creative team for using the musical format to explore the season's character arcs. She gave it four-and-a-half stars out of five for Den of Geek. Musical fan Ashley Lee and Star Trek fan Robert Lloyd discussed the episode for the Los Angeles Times and had positive thoughts. Lloyd felt the musical episode fit with the series' sensibilities and was "no more nonsensical" than other Star Trek episodes, and he also thought it was appropriate for a season with multiple romance subplots. Lee praised the work of Polce and Hanley, and was won over by the strength of the romances and subplots, particularly La'An's storyline and her song "How Would That Feel".

Keith R. A. DeCandido at Reactor praised the episode, calling it a "masterpiece" and enjoying how the overall structure followed traditional musicals. He believed the singing had been divided among the cast sensibly, based on talent, with Gooding having the best voice followed by Peck and Chong. Whitbrook said the episode's songs were "an eclectic mix of catchy ditties, all in all eight notable hits that are by and large great". Brookover said the songs were "delightful, often moving, and deeply earworm-y" and acknowledged that Polce and Hanley had written to each cast member's skill level. She added that "everyone in this cast can sing, and even those with modest vocal gifts acquit themselves well", particularly highlighting Gooding, Chong, and Romijn. Owen said the songs did not have the same "emotional heft or memorable lyrics/tunes" as those written by Benj Pasek and Justin Paul for the third season of Only Murders in the Building (2023), but he thought "How Would That Feel" and "Keep Us Connected" could become earworms for some and added that Chong and Gooding have the best voices of the cast. Baugher said the quality of the songs was "about what you'd expect" for a Star Trek musical, pointing to "Keep Us Connected", "How Would That Feel", and "I'm Ready" as the best. Chapman highlighted the use of Star Trek terminology in the lyrics. He said the singing abilities of the cast ranged from "trying their best" (Mount) to "legitimately great" (Gooding). In rankings of the episode's songs, Teresa Jusino at The Mary Sue and Rachel Hulshult at Screen Rant both placed "Keep Us Connected" at number one. Jusino included Russo's "boppy, choral version" of the main title in her list at seventh place, saying it was "not really a 'song', but it needed to be on here". Brookover and Lee also noted the new opening theme arrangement in their reviews, with Brookover calling it "a true gift to collegiate a cappella groups everywhere". DeCandido said the Klingon interlude was "one of the best moments in this episode full of them", while Scott Snowden at Space.com praised it as "inspired genius". Brookover said Horak gave "A+ silliness" in his performance as the singing Klingon captain.

Snowden said the episode "might very well be the best episode of Star Trek that's ever been made", but he thought its impact was lessened by the wildly-different tones of the season's episodes and a feeling that it was rushing its character arcs. He added that he would have appreciated a more varied mixture of song styles. DeCandido also noted that audiences may feel whiplash going from the darker tone of the previous episode to this one. Lloyd found it odd that the musical reality was created by the song "Anything Goes" (1934) and discussion of the Great American Songbook, but most of the original songs are of a more modern style. In a more negative review, Witney Seibold at /Film similarly said the songs did not live up to the promise of "Anything Goes", describing them as "mealy, unmemorable pop ballads", and said the episode lacked threat or danger. He felt it was not as effective as a hypothetical musical episode of a different Star Trek series, saying the singing was "frustratingly natural" for the Strange New Worlds crew who are generally open and light-hearted. Darren Mooney at The Escapist also found the episode to have no stakes or momentum, and was critical that it focuses on relationships that the audience knows will not be progressing due to the characters' roles later in the Star Trek timeline.

=== Accolades ===
Gooding was named as an honorable mention for TVLine's "Performer of the Week" for her performance in the episode, specifically for her "powerhouse vocals". The site added that Gooding "belted out conflicted feelings of determination and insecurity in a showstopping number that we'll probably have on repeat for the foreseeable future". "Subspace Rhapsody" was named the 7th best episode of the year by Salon, and one of the 19 best episodes of the year by TV Insider. Downs, Horgan, and Wolkoff were finalists for the 2024 Hugo Award for Best Dramatic Presentation, Short Form, for their work on the episode.
