= Martin Quinn (actor) =

Scottish actor (born 1994)

Quinn in 2026 at the Royal Institution

Martin Quinn (born 1994) is a Scottish actor. He is best known for playing Montgomery Scott in Star Trek: Strange New Worlds (2023–present), being the first Scottish actor to play the role. He first appeared in the Season 2 finale, where he rescued the crew of the USS Enterprise, and became a regular cast member for seasons 3, 4 and 5.

== Early life ==
Quinn grew up in Gallowhill, a housing estate in Paisley, Renfrewshire, Scotland.

== Career ==
At the age of 18, Quinn was cast in the role of Oskar in the National Theatre of Scotland’s adaptation of Let the Right One In. The play opened at Dundee Rep before transferring to the Royal Court and then onto the West End, with Quinn reprising the lead role on both occasions. He then attended Guildhall School of Music and Drama after receiving various scholarships and financial assistance from actors Alan Rickman and Richard Wilson. Quinn has performed in London’s National Theatre, the Old Vic and Shakespeare’s Globe as well as various Scottish theatres including a national tour of “Oor Wullie the Musical” where he played the titular role.

He made his feature film debut in the Scottish film Our Ladies and has since appeared in The Lovers and the final season of Derry Girls. In Scottish television, he has appeared in Limmy's Show, Scot Squad, and worked with Greg Hemphill and Robert Florence on the Hogmanay sketch show “Queen of the New Year” where he met writing partner Stephen Buchanan. After a number of online collaborations they were commissioned to write and perform in the short film “Cable Tied” for BBC Studios.

In 2023, Quinn began portraying Montgomery Scott in the second-season finale of Star Trek: Strange New Worlds. He was upgraded to contract status in season 3.

== Filmography ==
=== Film ===
Year	Title	Role	Director(s)	Notes	Ref.
2018	Drown	—N/a	Joseph Lynn	Short film	
2018	Swansong	Care Assistant	Joseph Lynn	Short film	
2019	Our Ladies	Stephen	Michael Caton-Jones	Coming-of-age comedy-drama film Based on Alan Warner's The Sopranos	
2022	Mint Chocolate Chip	Martin	Joseph Lynn	Short film	
2025	Soul		Eilidh Loan	Short film	

=== Television ===
Year	Title	Role	Notes	Ref.
2010	Limmy's Show!	Various	2 episodes	
2021	Scot Squad	Brian	Episode: "6.3"	
2021	Annika	Syd Mayfield	Episode: "1.5"	
2022	Derry Girls	Wee Cousin Rob	Episode: "The Reunion"	
2023	The Lovers	Jason	3 episodes	
2023–present	Star Trek: Strange New Worlds	Montgomery Scott	Guest (season 2 finale); series regular (seasons 3–)	

=== Podcast ===
Year	Title	Role	Notes	Ref.
2022	Doctor Who: The Ninth Doctor Adventures	Cameron Lawther (voice)	2 episodes	

=== Video games ===
Year	Title	Role	Notes	Ref.
2023	Diablo IV	Additional voices	Action role-playing game developed and published by Blizzard Entertainment	
