= Christina Chong =

British actress and singer

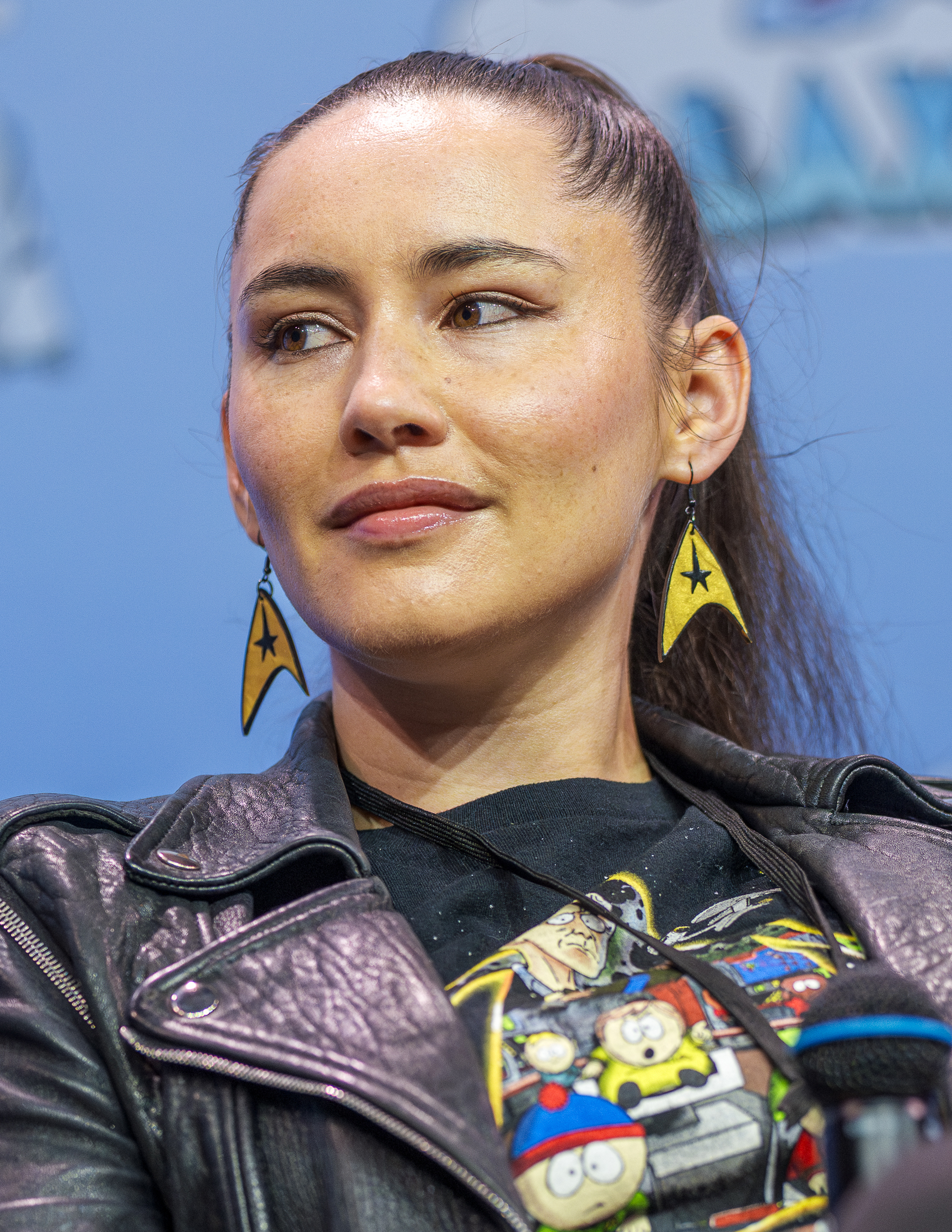
- Chong at GalaxyCon Richmond in 2026
- Born: Enfield, London, England
- Education: Italia Conti Academy of Theatre Arts
- Occupations: Actress; singer
- Years active: 2003–present

Christina Chong is a British actress and singer. She has appeared in several notable roles in film and television, including Monroe, Line of Duty, Halo: Nightfall, Black Mirror, Doctor Who, and 24: Live Another Day. She plays La'An Noonien-Singh in the Paramount+ original series Star Trek: Strange New Worlds (2022–present).

== Early life ==
Chong was born in Enfield, the daughter of a Chinese father and an English mother. She was first raised with her five siblings in Broxbourne. Later, after her parents separated, her mother moved her and her siblings to Longridge, her mother's hometown. Chong started dancing at the age of four and attended the Sutcliffe School of Dance in Longridge. At 14, she studied at the Italia Conti Academy of Theatre Arts in London. After graduating in 2003, she earned a role in Elton John's musical Aida, performed at the Colosseum Theatre in Essen. An injury cut short her career in musical theatre, so she turned to acting, training at the Lee Strasberg Theatre and Film Institute in New York City for 18 months. When Chong returned to London, she initially had trouble finding work, acting only in a few small supporting roles and commercials. To support herself, she gave acting lessons at schools and held a part-ownership of her father's Chinese restaurant in Harpenden.

== Career ==
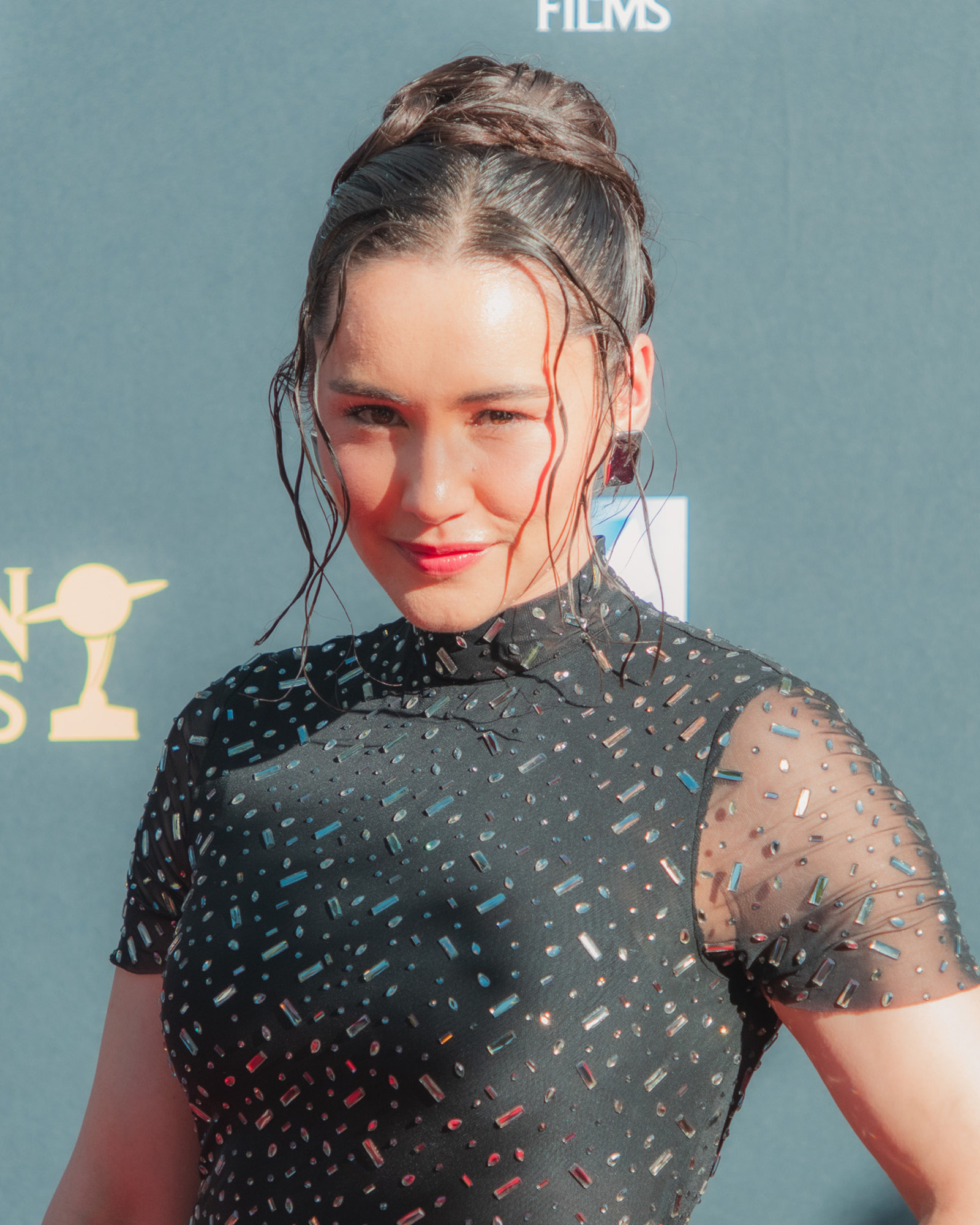
Chong at Saturn Awards in 2026

In 2011, Chong made her breakthrough with supporting roles in the movies W.E. and Johnny English Reborn and TV appearances in the Doctor Who episode "A Good Man Goes to War", and as a regular cast member in the medical series Monroe. In the next three years, she had regular and guest roles in a number of different British and American TV series.

In 2014, Chong was cast in a minor role in Star Wars: The Force Awakens, but was not seen in the final cut of the film. In 2015, she had a recurring role in the second season of the SyFy series Dominion as Zoe Holloway, a member of Vega’s Archangel Corps, who becomes the leader of the rebellion of the city's lower classes.

Since 2023, Chong is a main cast member of the Paramount+ streaming series Star Trek: Strange New Worlds as La'An Noonien-Singh, a descendant of the character Khan Noonien Singh.

== Filmography ==
=== Film ===
Year	Title	Role	Notes	Ref.
2008	Freakdog	Yoshimi		
2008	Chemical Wedding	Mei-Ling		
2010	Legacy	Jane		
2011	W.E.	Tenten		
2011	Johnny English Reborn	Barbara		
2015	Christmas Eve	Karen		
2015	Star Wars: The Force Awakens	—N/a	Deleted scenes	
2021	Tom and Jerry	Lola		

=== Television ===
Year	Title	Role	Notes	Ref.
2011	Doctor Who	Lorna Bucket	"A Good Man Goes to War"	
2011	Case Sensitive	DC Amber Williams	2 parts	
2011–2012	Monroe	Sarah Witney	Season 2	
2012	Whitechapel	Lizzie Pepper	2 episodes	
2013	Black Mirror	Tamsin	"The Waldo Moment"	
2013	The Wrong Mans	May Wu		
2014, 2021 & 2027	Line of Duty	DI Nicola Rogerson	Seasons 2, 6 & 7; 7 episodes	
2014	Halo: Nightfall	Macer	5 episodes	
2014	24: Live Another Day	Mariana	5 episodes	
2015	Dominion	Zoe		
2016	Of Kings and Prophets	Rizpah	9 episodes	
2017	Ill Behaviour	Kira		
2018	Bulletproof	Nell McBride	6 episodes	
2019	Heirs of the Night	Calvina		
2022	Grace	Sophie Bryce		
2022–present	Star Trek: Strange New Worlds	La'An Noonien-Singh	Main role; 35 episodes	
2022–2024	The Ready Room	Herself	2 episodes	
