= Jess Bush =

Australian artist (born 1992)

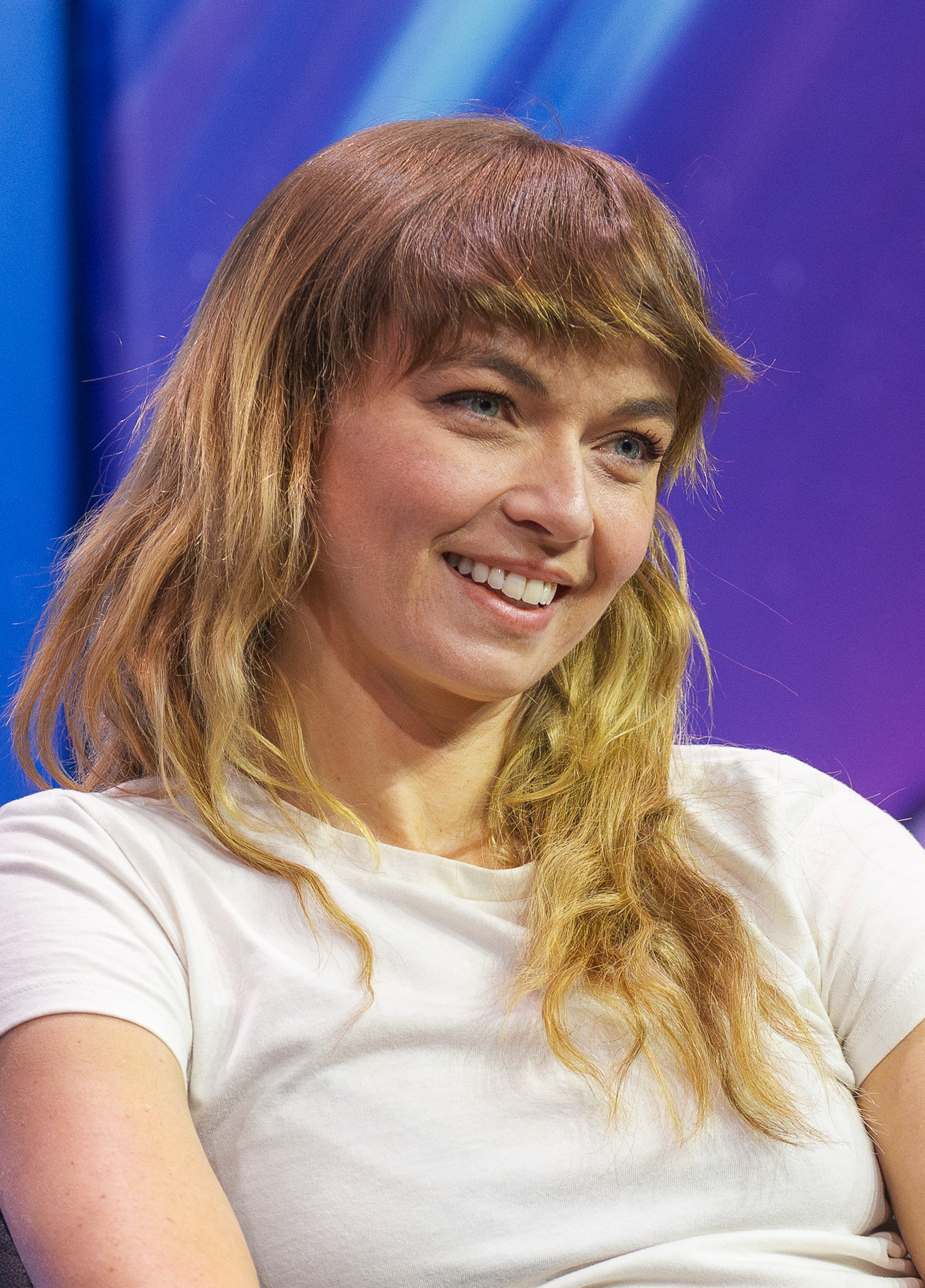
- Bush in March 2026
- Born: 26 March 1992 (age 34)
- Occupations: Actor; model; visual artist
- Years active: 2011–present

Jess Bush (born 26 March 1992) is an Australian actor, model, reality television personality, and visual artist. Her television work includes competing on the seventh season of the reality television series Australia's Next Top Model, and playing Nurse Christine Chapel on Star Trek: Strange New Worlds.

== Personal life ==
Jess Bush was born on 26 March 1992, and is from Keperra, Queensland, a suburb of Brisbane, Australia. Speaking with The Daily Beast in mid-2023 about Star Trek: Strange New Worlds' LGBTQ+ representation and her portrayal of a bisexual character, she described herself as queer.

== Visual arts career ==
A visual artist from childhood through her mid-20s, Bush began selling her pieces professionally at age 19. She is also a jewellery designer, and some of her pieces appear on Strange New Worlds. By mid-2017, Bush's studio was in Sydney's "infamous Hibernian House", she had returned from painting two commissioned murals in New York City, and had been a finalist for the 44th Muswellbrook Art Prize—New South Wales' second biggest art prize.

=== Bee Totem ===
In 2019, Bush began developing and exhibiting her ongoing Bee Totem series. She collects dead honey bees from beekeepers, preserves them in spheres of crystal resin, and attaches fine jewellery chains. Her exhibitions collaborate with projection artists and sound designers to hang the many preserved bees at different heights to create shapes and experiences in three-dimensional space.

She has described Bee Totem as recognizing and emphasizing the importance of the bees that, not only make the human world livable, but then "live by the thousands and die quietly by the thousands." The individual preserved bee in the sphere is amplified and magnified, showing its intelligence and beauty; it causes the observer to "pause and think about the moment that it died, because it's frozen in that moment after its death, so it's kind of like a memorial." The installation then amplifies "that impact of thousands dead at the same time".

Having received several rounds of funding from the Australian Government by 2022, Bush described it as "the most significant work that [she's] ever made" with a goal of doing so "probably forever". She would like to build a cathedral for thousands of preserved bees, to allow people to quietly sit and reflect in the immensity of sacrifice. While acting, Bush takes a hiatus from her visual art work, though she has taken her materials when shooting.

== Performing arts career ==
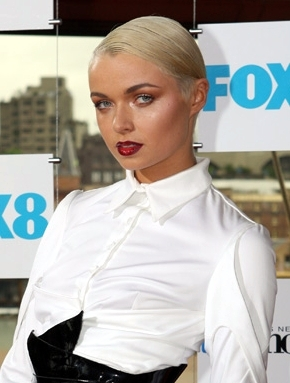
Bush in October 2011

Bush's first television appearance was competing on the seventh season of the reality TV series Australia's Next Top Model; she told the programme that she entered modeling for the challenge, competitiveness, travel, and variety. In Australia, she has also performed on Home and Away and Playing for Keeps.

In the early 2020s, Bush was "feeling pretty burnt out and exhausted by the hustle" of acting and performing; she told her talent managers that she was pulling back and resting, only interested in exciting productions, which led to her booking a role on Star Trek: Strange New Worlds. The 2022 Star Trek spin-off was her first television role outside Australia. Bush portrays Christine Chapel, a character previously played by Majel Barrett in the original Star Trek. Heavy described Bush's interpretation of the character as "very different [...] fun, irreverent, and a bit of a live wire." Bush doesn't use her native Australian accent for the performance, a distinction that helps her get into character physically and mentally.

=== Awards ===
Award	Year	Nominated work	Category	Result	Ref.
Saturn Award	2022	Star Trek: Strange New Worlds	Best Supporting Actress in a Streaming Series	Nominated	
Saturn Award	2024	Star Trek: Strange New Worlds	Best Supporting Actress in a Television Series	Nominated	

== Other professional work ==
Bush's work on Star Trek ignited a passion for the real-world space industry; by 2023, she was collaborating with NASA and Redwire at the Kennedy Space Center.
