= Babs Olusanmokun =

Nigerian actor

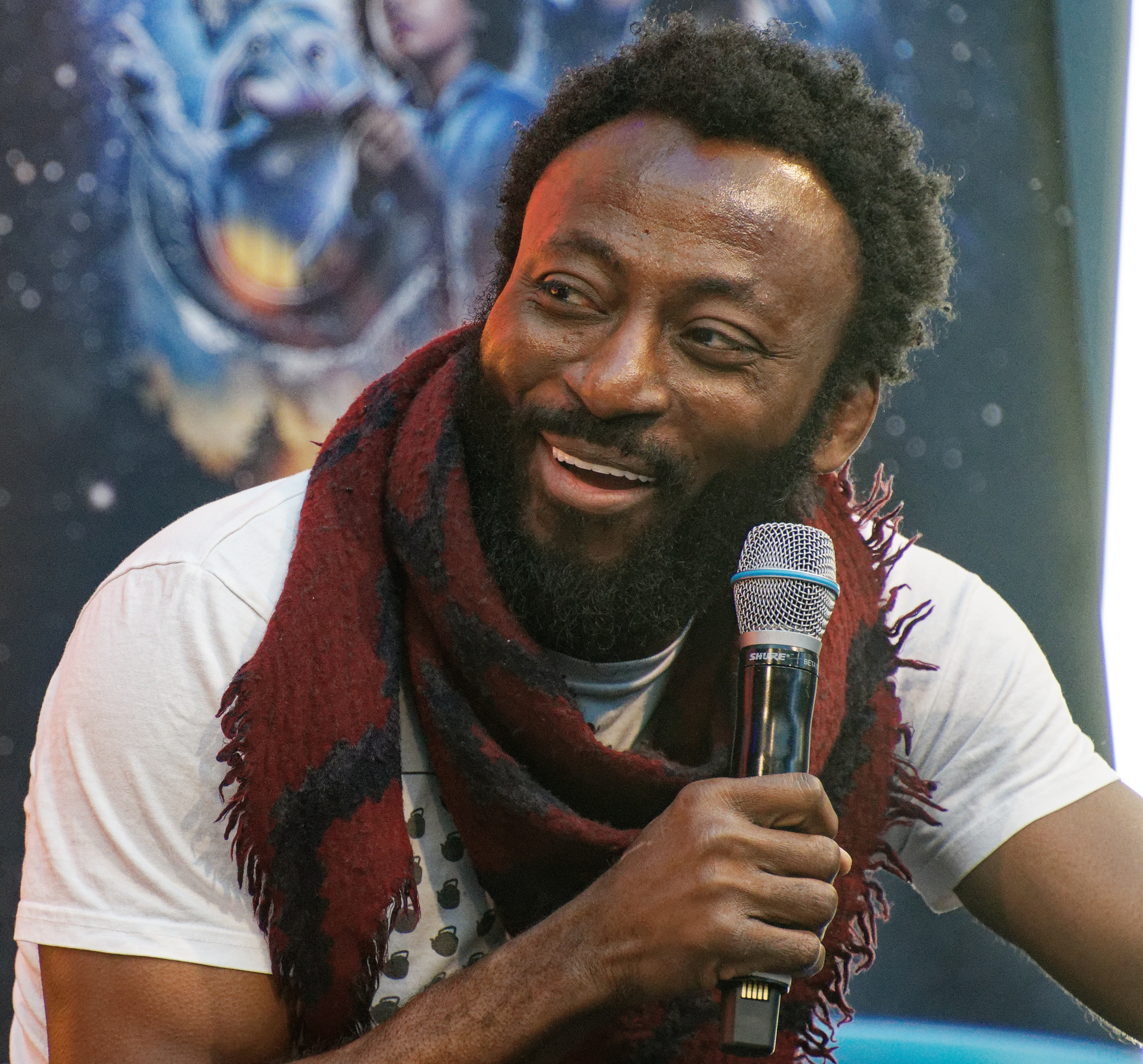
- Olusanmokun in 2024
- Born: 1984 or 1985 (age 41–42); Lagos, Nigeria
- Occupation: Actor
- Years active: 2004–present

Babs Olusanmokun (born 1984 or 1985) is a Nigerian actor based in the United States. He is best known for playing Dr. Joseph M'Benga in Star Trek: Strange New Worlds (2022–present) and Jamis in Dune (2021) and Dune: Part Two (2024). He also appeared in the video game Max Payne 3 as Serrano, a role that he both voiced and performed motion capture for.

== Personal life ==
Olusanmokun was born in Lagos, Nigeria, and is based in New York.

Olusanmokun is fluent in English, French, Yoruba and Portuguese, and is a Brazilian jiu-jitsu black belt and champion.

== Filmography ==
=== Film ===
Key
†	Denotes films that have not yet been released

Year	Title	Role	Notes
2004	Indocumentados	Mubenga	
2010	This Is Poetry	Ade	Short
2011	Restless City	Cravate	
2011	Ponies	Ken	
2013	Mother of George	Tunde	
2014	Listen Up Philip	Photographer	
2014	Shelter	Hospital Security Guard	
2014	Like Sunday, Like Rain		Stunt coordinator
2015	The Empty Street	Blacksmith	Short
2017	Where Is Kyra?	Gary	Titled Deceit in the United Kingdom
2018	Ouros	Magoan	Short
2021	Wrath of Man	Moggy	
2021	Dune	Jamis	
2023	The Book of Clarence	Asher the Torturer	
2024	Dune: Part Two	Jamis	
2024	The Ministry of Ungentlemanly Warfare	Mr. Heron	
2028	Viva La Madness †	TBA	Post-production

=== Television ===
Year	Title	Role	Notes
2006–2010	Law & Order: Criminal Intent	Chibueze/Tristan/Assassin	4 episodes
2007	The Unit	Painted Man	Episode: "The Outsiders"
2007	Veronica Mars	Kizza Oneko	Episode: "I Know What You'll Do Next Summer"
2008	Law & Order: Special Victims Unit	Mr. Marong	Episode: "Retro"
2008	Life on Mars	Perp #2	Episode: "Things to Do in New York When You Think You're Dead"
2012	Blue Bloods	Phantom	Episode: "The Life We Chose"
2012	NYC 22	Fouad	Episode: "Ransom"
2013	Copper	Zeke Canaan	Episode: "The Place I Called My Home"
2014	Unforgettable	Goodacre Oyensi	Episode: "D.O.A."
2014	The Blacklist	Yaabari's Soldier	Episode: "Lord Baltimore (No. 104)"
2015	Gotham	Mace	Episode: "The Scarecrow"
2016	Roots	Omoro Kinte	3 episodes; credited as Babatunde Olusanmokun
2016	The Night Of	Marvin	Episode: "The Art of War"
2017	The Defenders	Sowande	4 episodes
2017	Black Mirror	Clayton Leigh	Episode: "Black Museum"
2018	Sneaky Pete	Reggie	3 episodes
2019	The Widow	General Azikiwe	6 episodes
2019	Too Old to Die Young	Damian	5 episodes
2021	The Drowning	Ade	4 episodes
2022–present	Star Trek: Strange New Worlds	Dr. Joseph M'Benga	Main role
2022–2023	The Ready Room	Himself	2 episodes

=== Video Games ===
Year	Title	Role	Notes
2012	Max Payne 3	Serrano	Voice and motion capture
2018	Red Dead Redemption 2	Baptiste	Voice
