= Star Trek: Strange New Worlds season 1 =

Star Trek: Strange New Worlds
- Season 1
- Promotional poster
- Showrunners: Akiva Goldsman; Henry Alonso Myers
- Starring: Anson Mount; Ethan Peck; Jess Bush; Christina Chong; Celia Rose Gooding; Melissa Navia; Babs Olusanmokun; Bruce Horak; Rebecca Romijn
- No. of episodes: 10

Release
- Original network: Paramount+
- Original release: May 5 – July 7, 2022

Season chronology
- Next → Season 2

The first season of the American television series Star Trek: Strange New Worlds follows Captain Christopher Pike and the crew of the starship Enterprise in the 23rd century as they explore new worlds and carry out missions during the decade before Star Trek: The Original Series (1966–1969). The season was produced by CBS Studios in association with Secret Hideout, Weed Road Pictures, H M R X Productions, and Roddenberry Entertainment, with Akiva Goldsman and Henry Alonso Myers as showrunners.

Anson Mount, Ethan Peck, and Rebecca Romijn respectively star as Pike, Spock, and Number One, along with Jess Bush, Christina Chong, Celia Rose Gooding, Melissa Navia, Babs Olusanmokun, and Bruce Horak. Many of the regular actors and several guest stars portray younger versions of characters from The Original Series. A spin-off from the series Star Trek: Discovery (2017–2024) focused on Mount, Peck, and Romijn was discussed by January 2020 and officially ordered as Strange New Worlds in May. The showrunners chose to return to the episodic storytelling of The Original Series rather than Discovery's more serialized approach. The writers and directors focused on giving each episode a different genre and tone. Filming took place at CBS Stages Canada in Mississauga, Ontario, from February to July 2021, with additional filming in New Mexico for the visual effects.

The season premiered on the streaming service Paramount+ on May 5, 2022, and ran for 10 episodes until July 7. It was estimated to have high viewership and audience demand, becoming the most watched Paramount+ original Star Trek series. It also received positive reviews from critics for its episodic storytelling and cast. The season received several accolades, including a Primetime Creative Arts Emmy Award nomination and a Saturn Award win. A second season was announced in January 2022.

== Episodes ==
No. overall	No. in season	Title	Directed by	Written by	Original release date
1	1	"Strange New Worlds"	Akiva Goldsman	Teleplay by : Akiva Goldsman; Story by : Akiva Goldsman & Alex Kurtzman & Jenny Lumet	May 5, 2022
In the 23rd century, Starfleet Admiral Robert April recalls Captain Christopher Pike of the starship USS Enterprise from shore leave after Pike's first officer, Una Chin-Riley (referred to as "Number One"), goes missing during a first contact mission. Pike is reluctant to return to space and confides in Vulcan science officer Spock—who has just become engaged to T'Pring—that he saw a vision of his own paralysis during their mission with the USS Discovery. (Note: As depicted in the second season of Star Trek: Discovery (2019)) They travel to the planet Kiley 279, which is in a similar state to 21st century Earth and on the brink of civil war. They have reverse-engineered a weapon from starship warp drives after witnessing the Discovery mission in nearby space. Pike and his crew rescue Number One from captivity and break Starfleet's General Order One by interfering in the society to convince them not to use the weapon. They avoid repercussions because of the top secret nature of the Discovery mission but Starfleet doubles-down on the rule by renaming it the Prime Directive. Pike recommits to his role and captains the Enterprise on a new five-year mission of exploration.
2	2	"Children of the Comet"	Maja Vrvilo	Henry Alonso Myers & Sarah Tarkoff	May 12, 2022
Cadet Nyota Uhura is invited to a meal with other crewmembers in Pike's quarters, where she reveals that she is unsure about her future in Starfleet because she only joined as a way to escape from the pain of her parents' deaths. The Enterprise crew attempt to alter the course of a comet that is set to kill all of the inhabitants of a desolate planet, but it has a force field that prevents this. Uhura joins a team that transports to the comet's surface and discovers that it responds to music. A starship of "shepherds", who are escorting the comet, position themselves between it and the Enterprise; they believe it is a being called M'hanit who is an ancient arbiter of life. Enterprise distracts them to allow Spock to alter the comet's course and, as it passes by the planet, it releases water vapor into the atmosphere that will improve the conditions for life. Uhura decodes music from the comet which indicates that it had expected this interference, and Pike ponders the origins of the comet and whether this was more than coincidence. He also considers the lives of the cadets that he is destined to save by sacrificing himself.
3	3	"Ghosts of Illyria"	Leslie Hope	Akela Cooper & Bill Wolkoff	May 19, 2022
The Enterprise investigates the disappearance of a colony of Illyrians, who are banned by the Federation due to their genetic engineering. As an ion storm approaches, members of the away team return to the ship after unknowingly contracting a virus that addicts them to light. Number One is immune because she is an Illyrian, which she reveals so a cure can be synthesized from her blood. Trapped by the storm, Pike and Spock determine that the colonists were attempting to reverse their genetic modifications so they could join the Federation. They may have created the virus and transformed into plasma-like beings. The pair are protected from the storm by those beings and return to the Enterprise once everyone is cured. Number One attempts to resign, but Pike refuses. She wonders whether he would have shown more prejudice if she had not helped save the crew. Number One learns that the virus got through the ship's filter because chief medical officer Dr. Joseph M'Benga is using an outdated transporter. This holds his daughter Rukiya in stasis until he can cure her rare disease.
4	4	"Memento Mori"	Dan Liu	Davy Perez & Beau DeMayo	May 26, 2022
The Enterprise attempts to deliver a nuclear-powered air filter to a Federation colony, but finds many of the colonists dead. Security chief La'An Noonien-Singh helps evacuate the survivors and recognizes the situation as a Gorn trap; she was the only survivor of a Gorn attack in her childhood. A Gorn ship attacks and does significant damage to the Enterprise. M'Benga and nurse Christine Chapel resort to 21st-century medicine to treat the wounded when their equipment goes offline. The crew lure the Gorn ship into the atmosphere of a brown dwarf near a black hole, where both ships' sensors and shields are useless. Spock figures out a way to track the Gorn ship and they destroy it, but three more Gorn ships arrive. One is crushed by the pressure of the brown dwarf's atmosphere. Spock mind melds with Noonien-Singh to learn about the Gorn's communication system and they use this to trick one ship to fire on the other. Enterprise then warps around the black hole, temporarily disappearing, and ejects the destabilizing air filter which explodes and convinces the remaining Gorn ship that the Enterprise is destroyed.
5	5	"Spock Amok"	Rachel Leiterman	Henry Alonso Myers & Robin Wasserman	June 2, 2022
The crew go on shore leave while the Enterprise undergoes repairs at Starbase One. Number One and Noonien-Singh apprehend two ensigns conducting an unauthorized spacewalk as part of a game played by lower-ranked crew members called "Enterprise Bingo". Learning that they have reputations as "fun-killers", the pair try the game themselves. The half-human Spock has grown concerned that T'Pring thinks he is becoming too human. He plans to spend his shore leave with her but April interrupts to ask Pike and Spock for help negotiating with the R'ongovians, who are considering allying with the Federation, Klingons, or Romulans. After discussing his relationship with Chapel, Spock undertakes a special mind meld ceremony with T'Pring so they can understand each other better. This accidentally causes them to switch katras, effectively swapping bodies. Spock attempts to carry out T'Pring's work convincing lapsed Vulcans to return to logic while T'Pring helps Pike succeed with the negotiations. M'Benga and Chapel later switch Spock and T'Pring's katras back to their proper bodies.
6	6	"Lift Us Where Suffering Cannot Reach"	Andi Armaganian	Robin Wasserman & Bill Wolkoff	June 9, 2022
While en route to the planet Majalis, the Enterprise receives a distress call from a shuttlecraft under attack from a warship. Enterprise destroys the warship and the shuttlecraft personnel are transported aboard: a boy called the "First Servant"; his father and physician Gamal; and Alora, a leader on Majalis who is an old flame of Pike's. Pike agrees to return them to Majalis. Gamal attempts to fake his son's death to keep him from returning to the planet, but is thwarted and the boy goes to Majalis with Pike and Alora for his "ascension ceremony". Pike is allowed to witness the ceremony, where the corpse of the previous First Servant is removed from a machine and the new First Servant is connected in his place. Pike is horrified by this but unable to stop it, and Alora explains that Majalis can only remain a paradise-like society if a child is sacrificed to the machine. Majalis's rebellious colony objects to this practice and Gamal had joined them to save his son. Gamal helps M'Benga work on a treatment for Rukiya's condition and then leaves Enterprise to join the colony, hoping to save future First Servants.
7	7	"The Serene Squall"	Sydney Freeland	Beau DeMayo & Sarah Tarkoff	June 16, 2022
Starfleet Counselor Aspen travels with the Enterprise to a far-flung colony under attack from the Serene Squall, a rogue ship of space pirates. Pike and a boarding party transport over to the Serene Squall at the same time as its crew boards Enterprise. Pike uses his culinary skills and some manipulative tactics to encourage a mutiny on the Serene Squall, allowing him and his boarding party to gain control of the ship. Aspen reveals themself as Angel, the Serene Squall's captain. They contact T'Pring and give her an ultimatum: release Angel's lover, a Vulcan prisoner that T'Pring is attempting to rehabilitate, or Spock dies. T'Pring chooses to hand the prisoner over, but Spock stops her by pretending to break their engagement, claiming to have an affair with Chapel. Angel tries to fire on T'Pring's ship, but Pike and the boarding party use remote access codes to lock Enterprise's controls. Angel flees and the pirates surrender. Spock reassures T'Pring of his love for her and tells Chapel that their friendship is strictly platonic. He also reveals to Chapel that Angel's lover is his half-brother Sybok.
8	8	"The Elysian Kingdom"	Amanda Row	Akela Cooper & Onitra Johnson	June 23, 2022
The Enterprise is surveying a nebula when its warp drive fails, causing the crew to black out. M'Benga awakens to find the Enterprise's interior dressed as the high fantasy setting of Rukiya's favorite book and the crew unwittingly acting out its events in character. Chief engineer Hemmer is the only other crew member aware of the situation, thanks to his telepathic abilities, and they discover that the nebula has its own consciousness comparable to a Boltzmann brain. They find Rukiya and learn the nebula had detected her loneliness and created the fantasy to entertain her. It also cured her disease, but this will not last if they leave the nebula. The nebula offers to preserve Rukiya by converting her into an energy being within the nebula, which M'Benga reluctantly agrees to. He then sees a vision of Rukiya as a grown woman having experienced a life of adventures with the nebula, whom she calls Debra after her mother. Debra releases the Enterprise, restoring its warp drive and interior design. No one other than M'Benga can remember the fantasy reality. He tells Number One about Rukiya's fate.
9	9	"All Those Who Wander"	Christopher J. Byrne	Davy Perez	June 30, 2022
The Enterprise is en route to space station Deep Space K–Seven when it receives another priority assignment to investigate the missing USS Peregrine. While the Enterprise continues to K–Seven, Pike leads an away team to an ice planet where they find the grounded Peregrine. Hemmer and Uhura restore the ship's systems while Pike learns that it was carrying three refugees and one was infected with Gorn eggs. These hatched, and the hatchlings burst from his body and attacked the crew. Pike's team finds the other two refugees, who are the only survivors. One of them, Buckley, is also infected with Gorn eggs and the hatchlings burst out. They attack the team but they also fight each other until only the strongest hatchling is left. The team form a plan to kill the hatchling using cold temperatures from the ship's environment controls, but not before Hemmer is infected. He encourages Uhura to remain in Starfleet before throwing himself from the ship so he, and the Gorn inside him, will die in the cold. After the crew mourn, Noonien-Singh takes a leave of absence to help the last refugee find her family.
10	10	"A Quality of Mercy"	Chris Fisher	Henry Alonso Myers & Akiva Goldsman	July 7, 2022
While the Enterprise and the USS Cayuga provide supplies to an outpost near the Romulan Neutral Zone, Pike meets one of the future cadets for whom he will sacrifice himself. He decides to send warnings to them to prevent the accident from happening. Pike is then visited by an older version of himself from a future where the accident does not happen. He reveals the consequences of this decision: seven years in the future, (Note: Depicting an alternate version of events from the Star Trek: The Original Series episode "Balance of Terror" (1966)) the Enterprise sees a Romulan Bird of Prey starship destroy the outpost. They track it with the USS Farragut, commanded by Captain James T. Kirk who suggests an aggressive approach. Pike insists on negotiating and the Romulan commander agrees to a ceasefire, but his sub-commander disagrees and summons an armada of Romulan warships. The Enterprise is damaged, Spock is severely injured, and the Romulans declare war on the Federation. In his own time, Pike accepts that his fate is necessary to save Spock and prevent war. His peace is interrupted by Captain Batel of the Cayuga, who boards the Enterprise and arrests Number One for being an Illyrian.

== Cast and characters ==
=== Main ===
- Anson Mount as Christopher Pike
- Ethan Peck as Spock
- Jess Bush as Christine Chapel
- Christina Chong as La'An Noonien-Singh
- Celia Rose Gooding as Nyota Uhura
- Melissa Navia as Erica Ortegas
- Babs Olusanmokun as Joseph M'Benga
- Bruce Horak as Hemmer
- Rebecca Romijn as Una Chin-Riley / Number One

=== Recurring ===
- Adrian Holmes as Robert April
- Dan Jeannotte as George Samuel "Sam" Kirk
- Gia Sandhu as T'Pring
- Melanie Scrofano as Batel

=== Guests ===
- Samantha Smith as a Kiley 279 leader
- Lindy Booth as Alora
- Ian Ho as the First Servant
- Huse Madhavji as Gamal
- Jesse James Keitel as Angel
- Paul Wesley as James T. Kirk

== Production ==
=== Development ===
In June 2018, after becoming sole showrunner of Star Trek: Discovery (2017–2024), Alex Kurtzman signed a five-year overall deal with CBS Television Studios to expand the Star Trek franchise beyond Discovery to several new series, miniseries, and animated series. After Anson Mount left Discovery with its second season finale (2019), fans began calling—including through online petitions—for him to reprise the role of Christopher Pike in a spin-off series set on the USS Enterprise (NCC-1701), alongside Rebecca Romijn as Number One and Ethan Peck as Spock. In January 2020, Kurtzman said active discussions regarding a spin-off series featuring the actors had begun with executive producer Akiva Goldsman. Paramount+ officially ordered Star Trek: Strange New Worlds to series in May 2020, with Goldsman and Henry Alonso Myers set as showrunners.

=== Writing ===
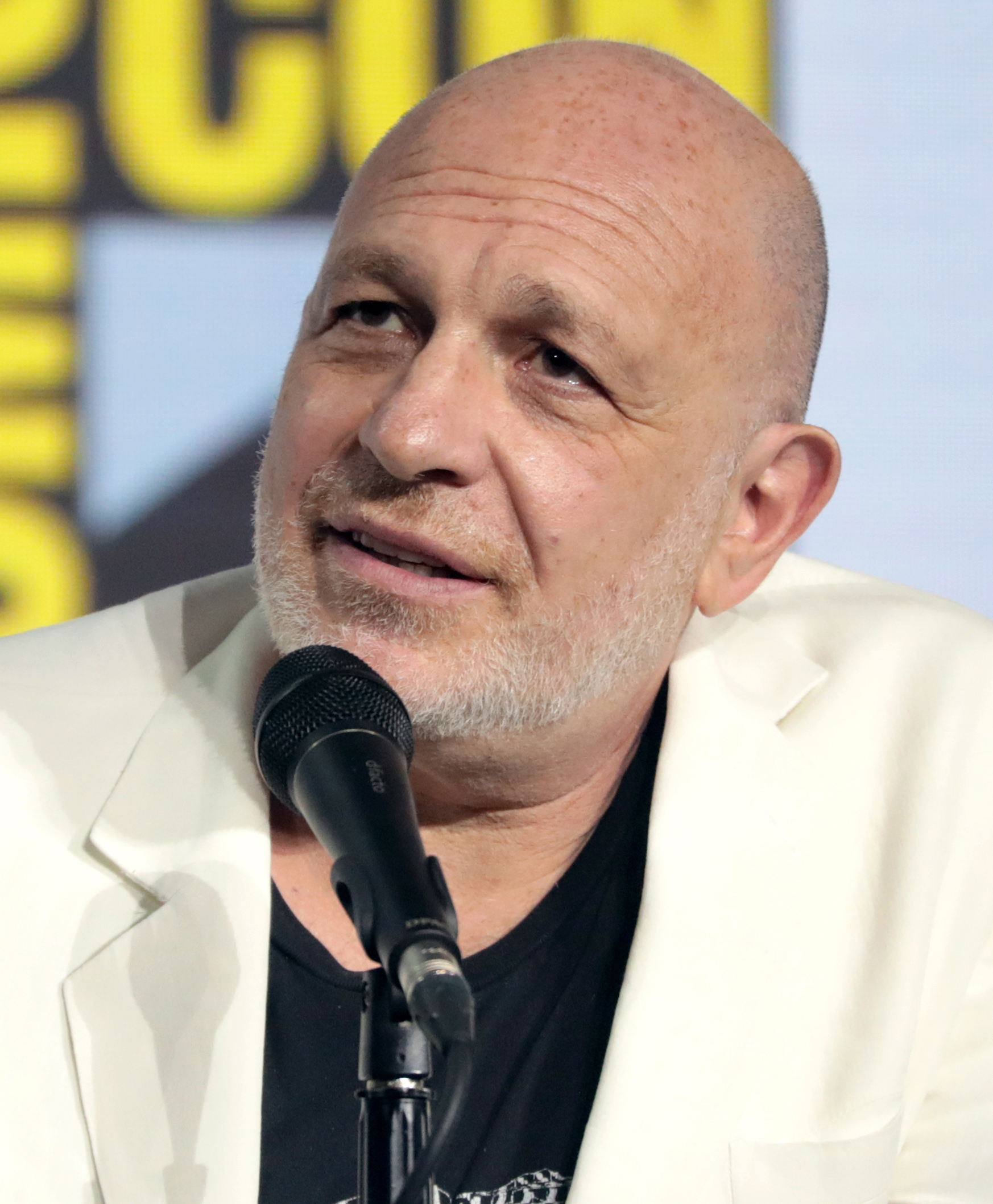
Strange New Worlds co-creator Akiva Goldsman co-wrote and directed the first episode of the season.

Myers began work on the series in March 2020, working from home due to the COVID-19 pandemic. Co-creators Goldsman, Kurtzman, and Jenny Lumet had written the first episode by the series' announcement that May, and a writers' room for the first season was underway by July. Stories for all 10 episodes were broken by the end of that month. Other writers for the season included Sarah Tarkoff, Akela Cooper, Bill Wolkoff, Davy Perez, Beau DeMayo, Robin Wasserman, and Onitra Johnson. In August, Kurtzman said they had been able to get "quite ahead in scripts" compared to previous Star Trek seasons due to the pandemic postponing the start of production. Goldsman said the series was more episodic than Discovery and Star Trek: Picard (2020–2023), though it still has recurring character arcs. He took particular inspiration from Star Trek: The Original Series (1966–1969) while Myers was more of a Star Trek: The Next Generation (1987–1994) and Star Trek: Deep Space Nine (1993–1999) fan. The writers wanted to show the full potential of the series by giving each episode a dramatically different genre and tone.

One of Goldsman's first ideas was to feature the Gorn, a lizard-like alien species introduced in the Original Series episode "Arena" (1967), as a recurring adversary for the season. Kurtzman was excited to use modern visual effects and puppetry to make the species feel "vivid and scary" compared to the "guy in a rubber suit" from the original episode. The writers discussed ways to incorporate the Gorn without contradicting the fact that the characters in "Arena", which is set around seven years after this season, have not seen the species before. Perez explained that their goal was to not "undo people's experience with The Original Series, but if we can manage it, perhaps to give us an interesting perspective to consider that lines up with the original stories". Specifically discussing the line "I face the creature the Metrons called a Gorn" spoken by William Shatner's James T. Kirk in "Arena", Perez explained that "maybe Kirk has never seen them, he could even be one of those people who still doubts the stories, or maybe even he has seen them and they don't look the same". Some of the ways that the series attempts to maintain continuity include featuring the Gorn in the backstory of La'An Noonien-Singh, a character who does not appear in The Original Series; not actually showing them in "Memento Mori" when Gorn starships are seen; and only showing baby Gorn in "All Those Who Wander". For "Memento Mori", Perez researched submarine films in an effort to replicate the feeling of the Original Series episode "Balance of Terror" (1966), while "All Those Who Wander" is a horror-themed episode inspired by the films Alien (1979), The Thing (1982), Gremlins (1984), and Predator (1987). Perez said Alien was an especial influence because it was "hard not to draw the comparison when writing a 'horror story in space'", and this is primarily seen in the way that baby Gorn grow inside host bodies and burst out of them like the Xenomorphs from that franchise.

Another change to established Star Trek canon was the inclusion of Spock's fiancée T'Pring from the Original Series episode "Amok Time" (1967). Myers acknowledged that the writers were interpreting that episode differently than fans had previously done in order to expand on T'Pring's role in Spock's life, but he felt this was necessary to explore a younger Spock. It allowed the writers to ask questions like "What are the pressures of being Vulcan? What are the pressures of coming from his family? What are the intricacies of Vulcan courtship that maybe we don't know about?" It also allowed T'Pring to be expanded on in interesting ways. In an effort to overcome the difficulties of their long-distance relationship, Spock and T'Pring accidentally switch bodies in "Spock Amok", which Star Trek: Lower Decks (2020–2024) showrunner Mike McMahan did uncredited writing for. "Lift Us Where Suffering Cannot Reach" is a philosophical and allegorical episode, introducing a society that thrives due to the sacrifice of children. Pike is forced to consider how children also suffer in the United Federation of Planets, which is a controversial idea due to the Star Trek franchise's usual depiction as a utopia. Wolkoff acknowledged that "most Federation worlds are post-scarcity and not focused on the accumulation of wealth, but is every Federation world perfect in this way? Has all hunger and poverty been eliminated? I don't think we know that for certain. We've seen Federation colonies and worlds in need of supplies and resources. And I don't think it's an enormous stretch to imagine certain Federation member worlds straying from the ideals they're supposed to uphold." Star Trek actor Wil Wheaton noted that the Federation evolves from 21st century America, which does have such problems, and the series previously highlighted similar issues in "Strange New Worlds" when footage from the 2021 United States Capitol attack was used in a montage showing the events that lead to Earth's World War III.

In addition to the comedy hijinks of "Spock Amok" and the horror of "All Those Who Wander", other genres explored in the season include storybook escapism in "The Elysian Kingdom" and the pirate-themed "The Serene Squall". The latter emphasizes the idea that there are uncharted areas of space where the Enterprise cannot contact Starfleet. Myers explained that one of their main goals was to remind audiences that this period of the franchise's timeline is "the age of exploration" compared to later series such as The Next Generation in which communications with Starfleet are often instantaneous. "Children of the Comet" introduces a tragic backstory for cadet Nyota Uhura, who the writers felt had not been explored much despite the character's important role throughout the franchise. Taking inspiration from the military experience of some of the writers, they felt it would be interesting if Uhura was unsure about being a member of Starfleet. This informs her character arc for the season, tying into the character Hemmer who becomes a mentor for Uhura. Pike's arc for the season sees him struggling with the knowledge that he will suffer a horrible accident in the future, which he saw in a vision during the second season of Discovery. This storyline culminates in the season finale, "A Quality of Mercy", when Pike sees a future where he avoids the accident but Spock is injured instead. The episode combined three big ideas from the writers' room: it retells the events of an Original Series episode, "Balance of Terror", with the series' cast and modern effects; it tells a "The Ghost of Christmas Future"-inspired story where Pike is visited by an older version of himself; and it explores why Spock is "willing to go to unbelievable lengths" for Pike in the Original Series episode "The Menagerie" (1966). Goldsman said the episode was about changing Pike's fate from a curse to a choice, and Mount said Pike was more resolute and free after deciding not to try to change his future.

=== Casting ===
Anson Mount, Ethan Peck, and Rebecca Romijn star in the series, reprising their respective roles of Captain Christopher Pike, science officer Spock, and first officer Una Chin-Riley / Number One from Discovery. Also starring are Jess Bush as nurse Christine Chapel, Christina Chong as chief security officer La'An Noonien-Singh, Celia Rose Gooding as cadet Nyota Uhura, Melissa Navia as helmsman Erica Ortegas, Babs Olusanmokun as Dr. Joseph M'Benga, and Bruce Horak as chief engineer Hemmer. In "The Elysian Kingdom", the main cast portray characters from a fantasy book: Olusanmokun is King Ridley, Mount is the sniveling chamberlain Sir Amand Rauth, Horak is Caster the Wizard, Chong is the dramatic Princess Thalia, Gooding is the villainous Queen Neve, Bush is Lady Audrey, Peck is Pollux the Wizard, Navia is Sir Adya, and Romijn is Z'ymira the Huntress. Princess Thalia has a dog, named Princess Runa, that was portrayed by Chong's own dog Runa Ewok. Hemmer dies in "All Those Who Wander", but Horak said this would not be the end of his involvement in the series.

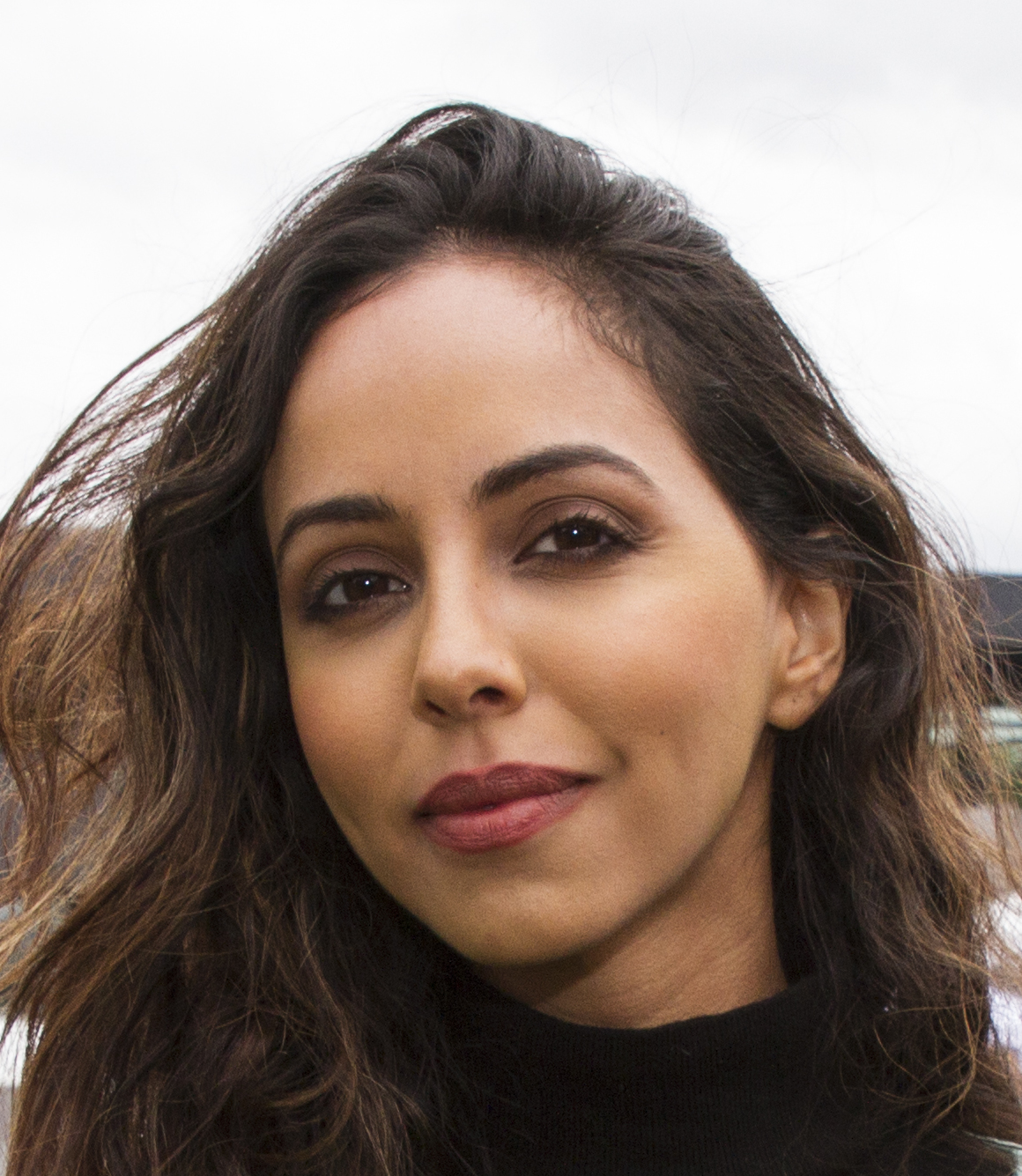
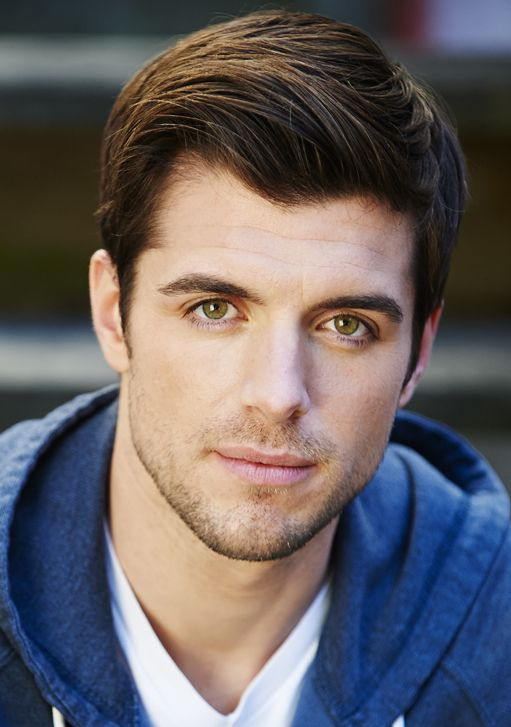
Gia Sandhu and Dan Jeannotte have recurring roles in the season as T'Pring and Sam Kirk, respectively, both characters from The Original Series.

The season premiere introduces two characters from The Original Series who have recurring roles in the season: Gia Sandhu plays Spock's fiancée T'Pring and Dan Jeannotte plays George Samuel "Sam" Kirk—the brother to future Enterprise captain James T. Kirk. Sandhu replaced Arlene Martel, who portrayed T'Pring in the Original Series episode "Amok Time", and Sandhu said she was mostly able to develop T'Pring herself due to the character's limited prior screen time. Sam Kirk briefly appeared as a dead body in the Original Series episode "Operation -- Annihilate!" (1967), portrayed by William Shatner with a fake mustache; Jeannotte's version retains the mustache. Another recurring guest introduced in the premiere is Adrian Holmes as Robert April, the first Enterprise captain. April first appeared in the Star Trek: The Animated Series episode "The Counter-Clock Incident" (1974), which depicted him as an older white man voiced by white actor James Doohan who also played Montgomery Scott in The Original Series and The Animated Series. Additionally, the likeness of Star Trek creator Gene Roddenberry, also white, was used by Michael Okuda to create a photograph of April in The Star Trek Encyclopedia (1994). Explaining why Holmes, a black man, was cast in the role for Strange New Worlds, Myers said he and the other producers liked Holmes's performance and felt he had the gravitas to fill the character's "mythic" role. Myers also did not think that casting a black man would be a controversial change or take away from the character's appearance in The Animated Series, and felt that Roddenberry may have himself gone with more progressive casting if he was making the original series in the 21st century rather than the 1960s. Okuda and "The Counter-Clock Incident" writer Fred Bronson both praised the casting of Holmes.

The casting of Paul Wesley as James T. Kirk for the second season was announced in March 2022, after the actor was spotted filming for that season on location. He makes a surprise first appearance during the first-season finale, playing an alternate version of Kirk from the potential future that Pike visits. Wesley said he did not want to do an imitation of Shatner's performance. Transgender actress Jesse James Keitel was revealed in early June to have been cast as the nonbinary character Dr. Aspen, a Starfleet counselor who develops a connection with Spock, for the seventh episode. The episode reveals this to be a ruse, as Keitel actually portrays the villainous pirate Captain Angel who is the lover of Spock's half-brother Sybok. There was some concern about featuring a queer character as a villain due to the history of such characters being villainized for their identities in media, but Keitel felt it was "high time we let queer people be villains". Myers said Angel was created to be a recurring villain and was always intended to be connected to Spock by their relationship with Sybok, who briefly appears in the episode portrayed by an unknown actor. Myers said Sybok would also return to the series in the future. Other guest stars for the season include Melanie Scrofano as Batel, a Starfleet captain and Pike's girlfriend; Samantha Smith as a leader on Kiley 279; Lindy Booth as Alora, a leader on Majalis who is an old flame of Pike's; Ian Ho as the First Servant, a boy on Majalis who was selected at birth to be sacrificed to the machine that runs the paradise-like planet; and Huse Madhavji as Gamal, the biological father of the First Servant who tries to save his son from the Majalis machine.

Additionally, audio of Sonequa Martin-Green as Spock's sister Michael Burnham from Discovery is heard in "Memento Mori". Rong Fu portrays operations officer Jenna Mitchell; André Dae Kim replaces The Original Series actor John Winston as transporter chief Kyle; Jennifer Hui plays Ensign Christina; and Alex Kapp provides the voice of the Enterprise's computer, replacing Majel Barrett. M'Benga's daughter Rukiya is played by Sage Arrindell as a child and Makambe Simamba as an adult, while Ava Cheung and Cameron Roberts appear as young La'An and her brother Manu in flashbacks to their time as captives of the Gorn. In "The Serene Squall", Roderick McNeil plays the Vulcan character Stonn who was portrayed by Lawrence Montaigne in "Amok Time". "A Quality of Mercy" features several actors taking over roles from "Balance of Terror": Matthew MacFadzean replaces Mark Lenard as the Romulan commander, Mathieu Bourassa replaces Montaigne as the Romulan sub-commander, and Ali Hassan replaces Garry Walberg as Commander Hansen. Montgomery Scott has a cameo appearance in the episode, but it was kept offscreen because the producers were not ready to cast a new actor. Matthew Wolf provided the voice for the cameo and was credited as "Engineer".

=== Design ===
Design work began by August 2020, with production designer Jonathan Lee leading a team of 60 people, including set decorator Justin Craig. The Enterprise sets were updated from the Discovery ones, to more closely align them with The Original Series and to reflect the Enterprise's in-universe rebuild following damage it sustained in Discovery. The sets were designed to function like a practical starship, including moving components and pre-programmed monitor graphics that reacted to the actors. Ten Enterprise sets were built for the season, including the transporter room, two corridors, crew quarters, the mess hall, and the cargo bay. A shuttlecraft interior was also built. The engineering, mess hall, and cargo bay sets were partially built and then augmented with virtual production technology. The sets were required to be bigger than The Original Series to better fit the cameras and crew, which Lee took advantage of to create expansive sets like Pike's large quarters. The sets were dressed with furniture designed in the 1960s or inspired by that era, such as Eero Saarinen's Tulip chairs; The Original Series used similar Tulip chairs by Maurice Burke that were considered to be "rip-offs" of Saarinen's design. The cutlery in Pike's quarters was designed by Arne Jacobsen and previously appeared in 2001: A Space Odyssey (1968) as well as episodes of Star Trek: Voyager (1995–2001) and Star Trek: Enterprise (2001–2005). Other designers who inspired Lee include Oscar Niemeyer, Carlo Scarpa, and Pier Luigi Nervi.

Bernadette Croft was set as the costume designer after working as an assistant for Discovery costume designer Gersha Phillips; Croft and Phillips co-designed the costumes for the season's first episode. The Starfleet uniforms were updated from the ones seen in Discovery, keeping the same silhouette but moving towards a more casual Original Series style. The uniforms retained the primary colors from The Original Series: gold for command, blue for science, and red for operations. They have the insignia for each division as a pattern on the shoulders and sleeves. In "Spock Amok", Pike wears a green wrap tunic during diplomatic negotiations which Goldsman requested as a refence to the green tunics sometimes worn by James T. Kirk in The Original Series. The Strange New Worlds version has a similar cut and silhouette to the series' main uniforms and leather accents on the shoulders and sleeves. The future version of Pike in "A Quality of Mercy" wears a version of the red uniforms from the Original Series films, but with the same fabric as the series' other uniforms and added Starfleet delta patterns on the shoulders and sleeves. Croft and her team had access to one of the costumes worn by Shatner in Star Trek II: The Wrath of Khan (1982) for reference. The series' miniskirt-style uniform was updated for the episode's future version of Uhura to include the "swoop neckline" from The Original Series. The designers were unable to access any of Nichelle Nichols's Uhura costumes from that series, but were able to reference a replica costume that was created for the Deep Space Nine episode "Trials and Tribble-ations" (1996). They created green hoop earrings for Gooding to wear in the episode based on ones worn by Nichols in The Original Series.

Actress Gia Sandhu in the dress that she wore in "Spock Amok", created by fashion designer Iris van Herpen

The first episode's script described T'Pring as wearing "ritual mating colors", so Croft took inspiration from the silver and purple costumes worn at Spock and T'Pring's wedding in "Amok Time" for Sandhu's dress. Croft's team also created a version of the ring that T'Pring wears in "Amok Time", while hairstylist Yasmine Crosdale gave Sandhu a similar "updo" look to what Martel had for that episode. "Amok Time" also inspired the costumes for Spock's dream sequence in "Spock Amok", which foreshadows the wedding sequence in "Amok Time". Paying homage to Martel's "fashion-forward dress", Sandhu wears a dress by Dutch fashion designer Iris van Herpen which Croft described as "wearable art". The dress was laser cut and glued onto mesh, and paired with an elaborate custom headpiece. Spock wears a leather and brocade jacket with a "traditional Vulcan silhouette", and the background characters all have "copper tones, metallics, and rich textured brocades" in their costumes. Later in "Spock Amok", Chapel goes to a bar in a black and white dress that was inspired by 1960s fashion as a reference to The Original Series.

For the desert-dwelling Deleb people in the second episode, textile artist Anna Pantcheva used techniques such as ice dying, rust dying, boiling wool, and covering embroidery with silicone to create an "earthy and organic quality". Costume effects builder Jennifer Johnson created pleated hats for the characters inspired by van Herpen's designs. Croft wanted to reflect the utopia-like society of Majalis in "Lift Us Where Suffering Cannot Reach" by dressing the characters in jewel tones with long, flowing fabric and lots of gold and jewelry. Alora's ceremonial gown in that episode was designed with Lebanese fashion designer Hassidrissin and featured pleated material that was hand dyed ombre to match the color of a sunset. In contrast with the Majalis costumes, the pirates of "The Serene Squall" have a dark, muted palette with metallic elements. Croft took inspiration from the "found objects, gritty grimy textures, and risqué characters" seen in the film Mad Max: Fury Road (2015). The main cast first learned about the medieval costumes that they would be wearing in "The Elysian Kingdom" months before filming began, and Navia said it was the most talked about episode of the season among the cast. She was excited to play a medieval knight, a role that she felt other series would have only given to a male actor. Croft said the episode was a dream come true and praised the actors for all committing to their fantasy roles. A highlight of the episode for her was designing matching princess dresses for Chong and her dog to wear, and Chong enjoyed getting to play a lighter role compared to her more dramatic scenes as La'An. Olusanmokun's king costume was inspired by Nigerian royalty to match the actor's heritage.

Legacy Effects provided alien prosthetics and animatronics for the season. Horak's Aenar prosthetics took three-and-a-half hours to apply each morning. The character's original design included contact lenses to give Hemmer white eyes, but Horak found them painful to wear and an eye specialist suggested that Horak not risk further damage to his sight given that he only has nine percent vision. His eyes were digitally altered by the visual effects team instead. New alien species were introduced in almost every episode, including "Strange New Worlds" which introduces the inhabitants of Kiley 279. Prosthetics department head Chris Bridges explained that the prosthetics for the Kiley needed to be interesting but also fast and easy to apply because there were up to 100 Kiley actors in some scenes, including members of the main cast. Legacy designed a "fairly simple forehead piece" that is a 'V' shape, extending around the eyes and over the nose. Special stencils were made to cover the prosthetics so "textural colored design work" similar to tattoos could be applied using airbrushes. The Shepherd in "Children of the Comet" was created with animatronics and prosthetics that left the actor's mouth visible but had the rest of the head controlled by puppeteers. Animatronics were also used for the alien Buckley in "All Those Who Wander", while the baby Gorn were created with puppets. Bridges said animatronics and puppetry were rare for television due to time constraints, but this episode demonstrated that they were viable and something that would be used more often moving forward. Kurtzman said these techniques required specific lighting to work well on camera. The visual effects team augmented the puppets, removing control rods and adjusting movements where needed. For the Gorn ships seen in "Memento Mori", Myers wanted them to look unlike any other starships in Star Trek, with alien shapes and movements that he hoped would make them scarier to the audience.

=== Filming ===
With the series' announcement in May 2020, Goldsman said he was unsure when production would begin due to the COVID-19 pandemic. Kurtzman stated on August 12 that filming would take place in 2021, and pre-production began on August 24. Kurtzman said in October that filming would be a "systematised, militarised operation" due to the pandemic, which the crew first experienced while working on Discovery. He elaborated that filming would function in "pods" to minimize the potential spread of the virus, and added that, due to the pandemic delays, the series would begin filming with more completed scripts than is usual for Star Trek. Paramount+ constructed a video wall to allow for virtual production on the series as well as the fourth season of Discovery (2021–22), based on the StageCraft technology used on the Disney+ series The Mandalorian (2019–2023). The new virtual set was built in Toronto by visual effects company Pixomondo and features a 270-degree, 70 feet (21 m) by 30 feet (9.1 m) horseshoe-shaped LED volume with additional LED panels in the ceiling to aid with lighting. The technology uses the game engine software Unreal Engine to display computer-generated backgrounds on the LED screens in real-time; additional filming for these visual effects took place in New Mexico.

Principal photography began on February 18, 2021, at CBS Stages Canada in Mississauga, Ontario, under the working title Lily and Isaac. Despite feeling that he was not a visual director, Goldsman wanted to direct the first episode and establish the series' tone because he had been thinking about it since he started working on Discovery. Goldsman worked with cinematographer Glen Keenan, who was the lead director of photography for the season after serving the same role on the second and third seasons of Discovery (2020–21). Keenan worked on five episodes and Magdalena Górka was cinematographer for the other five. Keenan brought back Cooke Optics' Anamorphic/i Special Flare lenses from Discovery, and also used Anamorphic/i Full Frame Plus SF lenses that were custom built by Cooke for the series. Coincidentally, cinematographer Philip Lanyon also chose to use full frame format lenses on the fourth season of Discovery around the same time. Keenan was excited to help establish the look of the series and took inspiration from the tools and techniques that were used on The Original Series. His aim was to make Strange New Worlds, which is mostly filmed on sets, feel organic by using on-set lighting where possible. Compared to Discovery, which has a filming style of always moving the camera and "being aggressive with cameras spinning in every episode", Keenan said the spin-off had a more reserved approach where they tried not to get in the way of sets, actors, and story. This style allowed the series to use larger cameras than Discovery, specifically Arri Alexa LF cameras. Górka consulted on virtual production with cinematographer Greig Fraser, who helped develop the StageCraft technology for The Mandalorian.

Filming taking place on the series' virtual production set, with a digital background displayed on the surrounding video wall

The opening scenes at Pike's snowy Montana ranch in the first episode were filmed on location north of Toronto. Mount's beard in the sequence took three months to grow. Due to pandemic restrictions, scenes on the Enterprise bridge were the only time that the whole main cast could film together. Mount played music on set those days to help them bond. Goldsman finished filming most of the first episode by early April 2021, only leaving some scenes that required large groups of extras which could not be filmed due to limits on the number of people allowed on set during the pandemic. He hoped to finish those scenes soon after. The showrunners encouraged the other directors to bring a unique look and tone to highlight the series' episodic approach. Myers stated, "sometimes it's funny, sometimes it's horrific, sometimes it's dramatic, and sometimes it's sad". The cinematographers worked with each director to devise a unique lighting approach for their episode that matched the themes in the script. In late April, a guest actor for the season flew from Vancouver to Toronto before testing positive for COVID-19. They had been in contact with a few crewmembers during a costume fitting before the positive test was returned, and those people were quarantined per the studio's protocols. Filming for the season was not impacted by the incident. Discovery and Picard director Maja Vrvilo began production on the second episode by April 26. Producing director Chris Fisher said the episode had the most complex virtual set of the season for the inside of the M'hanit comet, for which Pixomondo had to animate changing lights and colors into the digital background. The comet surface was filmed on a green screen stage instead of the virtual production set, due to scheduling and visual effects requirements.

Leslie Hope, who guest starred as Kira Meru in Deep Space Nine, directed the third episode, filming the Illyrian colony scenes at the former theme park Ontario Place. Dan Liu directed the fourth episode, Rachel Leiterman directed the fifth, and Andi Armaganian directed the sixth. This overlapped with Armaganian also directing an episode of Discovery due to pandemic-related schedule changes. Location filming for the planet Majalis took place at the Parkwood Estate in Oshawa, Ontario. Filming for the seventh episode took place in the week of May 31 with Sydney Freeland directing, followed by Amanda Row directing the eighth episode in the week of June 7. Christopher J. Byrne, the director for episode nine, was the first director hired for the season and was specifically chosen for his experience working in the horror genre. For the scene in the episode where Hemmer jumps out of the cargo hold, Horak was filmed doing the jump on a blue screen stage and that footage was included in the digital background that was displayed on the video wall during filming. Production on the season finale, directed by Fisher, began on July 7. It includes some shot-for-shot remakes of scenes from "Balance of Terror". Fisher and Górka also tried to match the lighting style of The Original Series, which made the episode visually distinct despite it mostly using existing Enterprise sets. Principal photography wrapped on July 24, while additional photography took place later in the year and concluded on October 11. More than 100 days were spent filming on the virtual production stage. Frequent Star Trek director Jonathan Frakes was expected to direct, but was unable to due to the pandemic.

=== Visual effects ===
In addition to working on the virtual production technology during pre-production and filming, Pixomondo also provided "post-shoot touchup work" to remove the seams between the video wall and ceiling, and traditional visual effects such as set extensions. Other visual effects vendors for the series included Crafty Apes, Ghost VFX, FX3X, Vineyard VFX, Boxel Studio, Barnstorm VFX, and Storm Studios. Visual effects supervisor Jason Zimmerman said there was a clear direction from Kurtzman, Goldsman, and Myers for how the series' effects should look, aligning with the "retro tech" style of Lee's designs. This approach meant the series had less visual effects shots than Discovery, and less complex work that focused more on cinematic establishing shots. Zimmerman took inspiration from the way The Original Series approached shots of starships and environments, something that he had wanted to do since fans had complained about the shorter, complicated starship shots in Discovery. Crafty Apes developed the transporter effects for the series, and were asked to create a classic style that was also modern and fun. The company researched how the effect was created for The Original Series as well as how it was updated for the remastered version of The Original Series on Paramount+.

=== Music ===
Composer Nami Melumad wanted the score to match the feeling of The Original Series, which she said had "a more active style, a more dynamic style", and she approached each episode as if it was a feature film. The first music she wrote for the series was for "Children of the Comet", because Gooding—who has a musical theatre background—and Peck had to sing along to the comet's music during filming. Melumad wrote a melody for the comet that she arranged in different variations. She was able to develop recurring motifs for the main characters, including Pike, Spock, Number One, Uhura, and M'Benga. She also wrote a love theme for Spock and T'Pring, which she found unusual to write because of the lack of emotion shown by the two characters. Melumad included the theremin in music for their scenes. Myers and Goldsman asked for the opening of the first episode to have cold music that was unlike other Star Trek projects, to highlight Pike's state of mind. Melumad used piano for this, and contrasted it with Pike's theme at the end of the episode which "embodies hope and acceptance".

Melumad reprised Gerald Fried's original fighting music from "Amok Time" during Spock's dream sequence in "Spock Amok", and Fred Steiner's theme for the Romulans from "Balance of Terror" in the finale. Jeff Russo, who composed the series' main theme, provided reference material from The Original Series. Melumad had been recording her music for several months at the Eastwood Scoring Stage at Warner Bros. Studios in California by February 2022. A 36 or 37 person orchestra, closer to the one used for The Next Generation than the larger ones for Discovery and Picard, was recorded under COVID-19 safety protocols. A soundtrack album featuring selections from Melumad's score as well as Russo's main theme and end credits track was released digitally by Lakeshore Records on April 28, 2023. All music by Nami Melumad except where noted:

Original Series Soundtrack – Season 1
No.	Title	Composer	Length
1.	"Star Trek: Strange New Worlds (Main Title Theme)"	Jeff Russo	1:51
2.	"Everyone Wants a Piece of the Pike"		3:50
3.	"Put a T'Pring On It"		2:56
4.	"Eyes on the Enterprise"		4:42
5.	"Home is Where the Helm Is"		4:16
6.	"Space Cadet"		1:01
7.	"Comet Away With Me"		2:36
8.	"Romancing the Comet"		3:23
9.	"M'hanit and Greet"		7:00
10.	"Since I First Saw the Stars"		3:54
11.	"A Holding Pattern"		4:44
12.	"Gorn With the Wind"		5:29
13.	"The Pike Maneuver"		2:03
14.	"Gorn But Not Forgotten"		3:24
15.	"Are You a Vulcan or a Vulcan't?"		2:59
16.	"Spock Too Soon"		2:03
17.	"Chris Crossed"		3:43
18.	"Looking For Ascension in All the Wrong Places"		3:04
19.	"Ascent-ial Questions"		2:01
20.	"T'Pring It On"		1:42
21.	"Pirates in the Sky"		2:54
22.	"Will You Be My Vulcantine?"		2:45
23.	"Won't You Be My Pirate?"		3:38
24.	"You're My Mercury Stone"		2:04
25.	"Don't Leave in Uhurry"		2:54
26.	"When the Hemmer Falls"		4:09
27.	"No One's Ever Neutral About Spaghetti"		2:53
28.	"Throw Plasma from the Train"		5:28
29.	"Star Trek: Strange New Worlds (End Credits)"	Jeff Russo	0:57
Total length:			1:34:23

== Marketing ==
Kurtzman promoted the series during a virtual "Star Trek Universe" panel for the Comic-Con@Home convention in July 2020, where Mount, Romijn, and Peck participated in a table read of Discovery's second-season finale and teased details about Strange New Worlds. On September 8, 2020, CBS All Access streamed a free 24-hour event to celebrate the 54th anniversary of The Original Series's premiere. It included a marathon of episodes from across the Star Trek franchise, and a break during the day for panels about different Star Trek series. These included the first official Strange New Worlds panel, with Mount, Romijn, Peck, Goldsman, Myers, Cooper, and Perez discussing the new series and their approach to developing it. In February 2021, Mount and Peck appeared in a marketing campaign for Super Bowl LV, advertising the rebranded streaming service Paramount+. A video introducing each of the series' main cast members and their characters was released during the Star Trek Day 2021 virtual event, celebrating the 55th anniversary of The Original Series's premiere.

Cast and crew promoted the series at the Television Critics Association February 2022 event, where the first poster was revealed. Later that month, as fan anticipation was "building towards the release of the official trailer", a teaser was revealed during a Paramount investors call. The company did not want footage from the call to be made widely available, and had several social media posts and fan accounts taken down for circulating screenshots of the footage. In March, the first teaser was officially released online. Amanda Kooser of CNET said it was "pretty different" from the one that was shown during the investor call, taking a more "atmospheric approach" than that version. She compared its footage of Pike riding a horse in snow to the series Yellowstone (2018–2024). Other commentators also noted the focus on atmosphere, especially highlighting Romijn's narration. James Whitbrook at Gizmodo speculated about the status of Pike at the beginning in the series and the impact that the second season of Discovery has had on him. /Film's Witney Seibold opined that, despite the series' title, the teaser indicated it was "not about being strange and new. It is about being traditional and comforting. After some of the more recent Star Trek shows... perhaps this retreat to the familiar is a wise move."

Character promos for the main cast were released during the week of March 28, 2022: teasers for Uhura and La'An were released on March 29, for Ortegas and Hemmer on March 30, for M'Benga and Chapel on March 31, for Spock and Number One on April 1, and for Pike on April 2. These led to the release of the official trailer and key art on April 3. A version of the trailer was also shown during the 64th Annual Grammy Awards on that day. The release of the trailer began a week of celebrations for "First Contact Day", marking the fictional holiday of April 5 when first contact between humans and aliens was made in the Star Trek universe. Ryan Parker of The Hollywood Reporter said the trailer had "eye-popping sci-fi action and dashes of nostalgia", while Maggie Lovitt of Collider said it had "the best of both worlds, combining beloved characters from The Original Series with the awe-inspiring and engaging stories that has made Star Trek: Discovery a fan favorite". Writing for Inverse, Ryan Britt felt the series was being presented as the most "mainstream" franchise iteration since the 2009 reboot film with a "zippy, old-school, swashbuckling space adventure" tone that matched The Original Series combined with a modern approach to sets and effects similar to the reboot films. Britt felt some "hardcore fans" would take issue with this due to wanting the series to "actually look like it was filmed in the 1960s. But, the overall goal of Strange New Worlds feels too populist to care. Like the reboots, this series is going for a big audience."

Later in April 2022, a panel for the series was held at the Star Trek: Mission Chicago convention where the cast and crew discussed the first season and revealed a full clip from the first episode that had been seen in part during the character promos. Fans at the convention were able to pre-order their own Starfleet boots—in gray (for medical) or standard black—from shoe designer John Fluevog. The boots became available for purchase at Fluevog outlets later in 2022. Mission Chicago also had an exhibit of costumes and props from the series which was then moved to the Paley Center for Media in New York City for a larger exhibit called "The Visionary Universe of Star Trek: Strange New Worlds", running from April 27 to May 29. The first public screening of the series' first two episodes took place at the Paley Center on May 1, following a gold carpet premiere event on April 30. At the Las Vegas Star Trek convention in August, Star Trek Wines announced a 2221 Chateau Picard wine, based on a bottle seen in "Children of the Comet", which was created by the real Château Picard in Bordeaux, France.

== Release ==
=== Streaming and broadcast ===
The season premiered on the streaming service Paramount+ in the United States, Latin America, Australia, and the Nordics on May 5, 2022, and ran for 10 episodes until July 7. It was released in Canada by Bell Media (broadcast on CTV Sci-Fi Channel before streaming on Crave), in New Zealand on TVNZ, and in India on Voot. The season was released in other countries as Paramount+ or SkyShowtime (a combination of Paramount+ and Peacock for some of Europe) became available there. Paramount+ temporarily released the entire season for free on its YouTube channel in May 2023, ahead of the release of the second season later that year. In August 2023, Star Trek content was removed from Crave and the season began streaming on Paramount+ in Canada. It would continue to be broadcast on CTV Sci-Fi and be available on CTV.ca and the CTV app.

The first two episodes of the season were broadcast in the US on CBS on September 8, 2023, as part of a Star Trek Day celebration. This gave broadcast audiences without Paramount+ a chance to preview the series. Ahead of the third season's release, the entire first season was again made available for free in the US from June 30 to July 31, 2025, on Pluto TV, Apple TV, Roku, and Paramount+'s free content hub and YouTube channel.

=== Home media ===
The season was released on DVD, Blu-Ray, and Limited Edition Steelbook formats in the US on March 21, 2023. The release includes over 90 minutes of bonus features, including deleted scenes, a gag reel, audio commentary for the season premiere by Mount and Goldsman, and featurettes on the making of the season, the production design and use of virtual production technology, and Mount's portrayal of Pike. As a surprise that was not announced in advance, the home media release also includes the Original Series episode "Balance of Terror" which the season finale is related to.

== Reception ==
=== Viewership ===
According to Whip Media, which tracks viewership data for the 19 million worldwide users of its TV Time app, Strange New Worlds was the second-most anticipated new series of May 2022 behind Disney+'s Obi-Wan Kenobi. Variety also named it one of the 40 most anticipated series of 2022. Whip Media ranked Strange New Worlds in the top 10 original streaming series for US viewership each week it was released except for the week of the premiere. Parrot Analytics determines audience "demand expressions" based on various data sources, and the company calculated that Strange New Worlds was the 26th-most in demand US streaming series for the week ending on May 6 (after the series premiered on May 5). It then saw a 92.4 percent rise in demand expression for the series, which moved up to third-most in demand the next week behind Netflix's Stranger Things and Disney+'s The Mandalorian. Parrot said the series was 35.1 times more in demand than the average US streaming series. It remained on Parrot's weekly top 10 list until the week after the finale's release, and debuted at fifth place on the company's monthly list, for May 2022, at 30.9 times more in demand than the average series. The only other Paramount+ series on the list for that month was the 9th-ranked second season of Picard. In August, Paramount+ said Strange New Worlds was the most-watched original Star Trek series on the service over its first 90 days, and the second-most watched original series in general for the service in the United Kingdom.

=== Critical response ===
On review aggregator website Rotten Tomatoes, 98% of 84 critics reviews were positive and the average of rated reviews was 8.1 out of 10. The critics consensus reads, "Strange New Worlds treks across familiar territory to refreshing effect, its episodic structure and soulful cast recapturing the sense of boundless discovery that defined the franchise's roots." Metacritic, which uses a weighted average, assigned a score of 76 out of 100 based on 14 reviews, indicating a "generally favorable" response. Critics commonly praised the cast, particularly Mount, as well as the throwback production design and episodic format.

=== Accolades ===
The season was awarded the Ruderman Seal of Authentic Representation by the Ruderman Family Foundation for the casting of Horak. Mount was named as an honorable mention for TVLine's "Performer of the Week" for his performance in "A Quality of Mercy", which the site said he "went above and beyond" in. Mount was later included on Vulture's list of standout television performances for 2022.

In July 2022, Alan Sepinwall of Rolling Stone named Strange New Worlds one of the 15 best series of 2022 so far, and Gizmodo included it on a list of the best "genre television" of the year so far. The next month, Zosha Millman included it on a list of the best series so far in 2022 for Polygon, as did Justin Kirkland and Adrienne Westenfeld who put it sixth on a list of twenty-five for Esquire. At the end of the year, the series was named on multiple best or top television series lists for 2022, including by the Houston Chronicle (4th), The Salt Lake Tribune (4th), Kathryn VanArendonk at Vulture (4th), Newsday (6th), Esquire (7th), Film School Rejects (7th), Superhero Hype! (8th), Rolling Stone (11th), and Paste (16th), as well as by Gizmodo, the Los Angeles Times, and Nerdist on unranked lists.

Accolades received by the first season of Star Trek: Strange New Worlds
Award	Date of ceremony	Category	Recipient(s)	Result	Ref.
Australian Production Design Guild Awards	August 26, 2023	Concept Art Award	Daniel J Burns and Jonathan Lee	Nominated	
Canadian Society of Cinematographers Awards	May 6, 2023	Dramatic Series Cinematography – Commercial	Glen Keenan (for "All Those Who Wander")	Nominated	
Critics' Choice Super Awards	March 16, 2023	Best Science Fiction/Fantasy Series, Limited Series or Made-For-TV Movie	Star Trek: Strange New Worlds	Nominated	
Critics' Choice Super Awards	March 16, 2023	Best Actor in a Science Fiction/Fantasy Series, Limited Series or Made-For-TV Movie	Anson Mount	Nominated	
Dragon Awards	September 5, 2022	Best Science Fiction or Fantasy TV Series	Star Trek: Strange New Worlds	Nominated	
Golden Trailer Awards	June 29, 2023	Best Comedy / Drama TrailerByte for a TV / Streaming Series	Windows to the Worlds social video	Nominated	
Hollywood Critics Association TV Awards	August 14, 2022	Legacy Award (Note: An honorary award at the Hollywood Critics Association TV Awards for a series that "has taken a beloved property and, without relying solely on nostalgia, has been able to pay respectful tribute to the past while modernizing it in a fun and meaningful way".)	Star Trek: Strange New Worlds	Won	
Hollywood Critics Association TV Awards	August 14, 2022	Best Streaming Series, Drama	Star Trek: Strange New Worlds	Nominated	
ICG Publicists Awards	March 10, 2023	Maxwell Weinberg Award for Television Publicity Campaign	Star Trek: Strange New Worlds	Nominated	
Primetime Creative Arts Emmy Awards	September 3, 2022	Outstanding Sound Editing for a Comedy or Drama Series (One-Hour)	Matthew E. Taylor, Michael Schapiro, Kip Smedley, Clay Weber, John Sanacore, David Barbee, Matt Decker, Alyson Dee Moore, Rick Owens, and Chris Moriana (for "Memento Mori")	Nominated	
Saturn Awards	October 25, 2022	Best Science Fiction Series (Streaming)	Star Trek: Strange New Worlds	Won	
Saturn Awards	October 25, 2022	Best Actor in a Streaming Series	Anson Mount	Nominated	
Saturn Awards	October 25, 2022	Best Supporting Actor in a Streaming Series	Ethan Peck	Nominated	
Saturn Awards	October 25, 2022	Best Supporting Actress in a Streaming Series	Jess Bush	Nominated	
Society of Composers & Lyricists Awards	February 15, 2023	David Raksin Award for Emerging Talent	Nami Melumad	Won	
