= Lift Us Where Suffering Cannot Reach =

- Star Trek: Strange New Worlds episode
- Episode no.: Season 1 Episode 6
- Directed by: Andi Armaganian
- Written by: Robin Wasserman; Bill Wolkoff
- Cinematography by: Magdalena Górka
- Editing by: John Wesley Whitton
- Original release date: June 9, 2022
- Running time: 51 minutes

Guest appearances
- Lindy Booth as Alora; Dan Jeannotte as Sam Kirk; Ian Ho as the First Servant; Huse Madhavji as Gamal

Episode chronology
← Previous "Spock Amok"	Next → "The Serene Squall"
- Star Trek: Strange New Worlds season 1

"Lift Us Where Suffering Cannot Reach" is the sixth episode of the first season of the American television series Star Trek: Strange New Worlds. The series follows Captain Christopher Pike and the crew of the starship Enterprise in the 23rd century as they explore new worlds and carry out missions during the decade before Star Trek: The Original Series (1966–1969). The episode depicts a society that thrives due to the sacrifice of children. It was written by Robin Wasserman and Bill Wolkoff, and directed by Andi Armaganian.

Anson Mount, Ethan Peck, and Rebecca Romijn respectively star as Pike, Spock, and Number One, along with Jess Bush, Christina Chong, Celia Rose Gooding, Melissa Navia, and Babs Olusanmokun. Strange New Worlds was ordered to series in May 2020, with a goal to give each episode a dramatically different genre and tone; this is a philosophical and allegorical episode. Location filming took place at the Parkwood Estate in Oshawa, Ontario.

"Lift Us Where Suffering Cannot Reach" premiered on the streaming service Paramount+ on June 9, 2022. It was estimated to have high viewership and audience demand, and was positively received by critics who compared it to the short story "The Ones Who Walk Away from Omelas" (1973) by Ursula K. Le Guin.

== Plot ==
While en route to the planet Majalis, the Enterprise receives a distress call from a shuttlecraft under attack from a warship. Enterprise destroys the warship and the shuttlecraft personnel are transported aboard: a boy called the "First Servant"; his father and physician Gamal; and Alora, a leader on Majalis who is an old flame of Pike's. Pike agrees to return them to Majalis. Gamal attempts to fake his son's death to keep him from returning to the planet, but is thwarted and the boy goes to Majalis with Pike and Alora for his "ascension ceremony". Pike is allowed to witness the ceremony, where the corpse of the previous First Servant is removed from a machine and the new First Servant is connected in his place. Pike is horrified by this but unable to stop it, and Alora explains that Majalis can only remain a paradise-like society if a child is sacrificed to the machine. Majalis's rebellious colony objects to this practice and Gamal had joined them to save his son. Gamal helps M'Benga work on a treatment for Rukiya's condition and then leaves Enterprise to join the colony, hoping to save future First Servants.

== Production ==
Paramount+ officially ordered Star Trek: Strange New Worlds to series in May 2020, with Akiva Goldsman and Henry Alonso Myers set as showrunners. They wanted to show the full potential of the series by giving each episode a dramatically different genre and tone. "Lift Us Where Suffering Cannot Reach" is a philosophical and allegorical episode, introducing a society that thrives due to the sacrifice of children.

Anson Mount, Ethan Peck, and Rebecca Romijn star in the series as Captain Christopher Pike, science officer Spock, and first officer Una Chin-Riley / Number One, respectively. Also starring are Jess Bush as nurse Christine Chapel, Christina Chong as chief security officer La'An Noonien-Singh, Celia Rose Gooding as Ensign Nyota Uhura, Melissa Navia as helmsman Erica Ortegas, and Babs Olusanmokun as Dr. Joseph M'Benga. Guest stars for the episode include Lindy Booth as Alora, a leader on Majalis who is an old flame of Pike's; Ian Ho as the First Servant, a boy on Majalis who was selected at birth to be sacrificed to the machine that runs the paradise-like planet; and Huse Madhavji as Gamal, the biological father of the First Servant who tries to save his son from the Majalis machine.

Costume designer Bernadette Croft wanted to reflect the utopia-like society of Majalis by dressing the characters in jewel tones with long, flowing fabric and lots of gold and jewelry. Alora's ceremonial gown was designed with Lebanese fashion designer Hassidrissin and featured pleated material that was hand dyed ombre to match the color of a sunset.

Filming for the season began in February 2021 at CBS Stages Canada in Mississauga, Ontario. Andi Armaganian directed the episode at the same time as she was directing an episode of Star Trek: Discovery (2017–2024) due to COVID-19 pandemic-related schedule changes. Location filming for the planet Majalis took place at the Parkwood Estate in Oshawa, Ontario. Filming for the season wrapped in July.

== Release ==
"Lift Us Where Suffering Cannot Reach" was released on June 9, 2022, on the streaming service Paramount+ in the United States and other countries where the service is available. The episode, along with the rest of the first season, was released on DVD, Blu-Ray, and Limited Edition Steelbook formats in the US on March 21, 2023.

== Reception ==
=== Viewership ===
Whip Media, which tracks viewership data for the 19 million worldwide users of its TV Time app, ranked Strange New Worlds as the sixth-most watched original streaming series for US viewership during the week ending June 12, 2022. Parrot Analytics determines audience "demand expressions" based on various data sources, and the company calculated that Strange New Worlds was the sixth-most in demand US streaming series for the week ending on June 10, the day after the episode was released. Parrot said the series was 32.3 times more in demand than the average US streaming series.

=== Critical response ===
On review aggregator website Rotten Tomatoes, 100% of 6 critics reviews for the episode were positive and the average of rated reviews was 7.8 out of 10. Multiple critics compared the episode to the short story "The Ones Who Walk Away from Omelas" (1973) by Ursula K. Le Guin, which was also an inspiration for the third season of Star Trek: Discovery (2021).

Writing for Inverse, Ryan Britt called the episode's ending a "gut punch", because of Pike's inability to save the child, and said the episode introduced ambiguity into the utopian nature of the Federation: Alora compares the trade-offs of the life in the Federation to her own world's shocking ritual, throwing the nature of the Federation's "post-scarcity" future into doubt. Gizmodo's James Whitbrook also noted the episode's downbeat conclusion, calling the episode "the first of [the] debut season where things conclude on a pointedly bitter, inconclusive note for the Enterprise crew". He described the different tone as "refreshing", offering more moral complexity than previous episodes of Strange New Worlds. However, he acknowledged that it "doesn't always quite work", feeling padded, and leaning too much on plot-twists rather than real narrative depth. Darren Mooney at The Escapist criticized episode's conclusion, calling it "cynical" and writing that the show's first season "takes a break from offering underwhelming rehashes of older Star Trek episodes to offer an underwhelming rehash of a science fiction classic".
