= List of Star Trek: Strange New Worlds characters =

Star Trek: Strange New Worlds is an American television series created by Akiva Goldsman, Alex Kurtzman, and Jenny Lumet for the streaming service Paramount+. It is the 11th Star Trek series and debuted in 2022 as part of Kurtzman's expanded Star Trek Universe. A spin-off from the series Star Trek: Discovery (2017–2024), it follows Captain Christopher Pike and the crew of the starship Enterprise in the 23rd century as they explore new worlds and carry out missions during the decade before Star Trek: The Original Series (1966–1969).

Anson Mount, Ethan Peck, and Rebecca Romijn respectively star as Pike, Spock, and Number One, all characters from The Original Series. Jess Bush, Christina Chong, Celia Rose Gooding, Melissa Navia, and Babs Olusanmokun also star, joined by Bruce Horak for the first season and Martin Quinn from the third. Many of the regular actors and several guest stars portray younger versions of characters from The Original Series.

This list includes the main cast of Strange New Worlds, guest stars with recurring roles, and other noteworthy guests and co-stars.

== Cast overview ==
This section includes cast members who will appear or have appeared in main or recurring roles:

- A green cell indicates the actor is a main cast member.
- A red cell indicates the actor is a recurring guest star.
- A blue cell indicates the actor is a guest star.
- A yellow cell indicates the actor is a co-star.

Star Trek: Strange New Worlds main cast
Actor	Character	Appearances			
Actor	Character	Season 1	Season 2	Season 3	Season 4
Anson Mount	Christopher Pike	Main	Main	Main	Main
Ethan Peck	Spock	Main	Main	Main	Main
Jess Bush	Christine Chapel	Main	Main	Main	Main
Christina Chong	La'An Noonien-Singh	Main	Main	Main	Main
Celia Rose Gooding	Nyota Uhura	Main	Main	Main	Main
Melissa Navia	Erica Ortegas	Main	Main	Main	Main
Babs Olusanmokun	Joseph M'Benga	Main	Main	Main	Main
Bruce Horak	Hemmer	Main	Guest		
Rebecca Romijn	Una Chin-Riley / Number One	Main	Main	Main	Main
Martin Quinn	Montgomery "Scotty" Scott	Co-star (Note: Scotty has an off-screen cameo in the first-season finale voiced by Matthew Wolf.)	Guest	Main	Main

Star Trek: Strange New Worlds recurring cast
Actor	Character	Appearances			
Actor	Character	Season 1	Season 2	Season 3	Season 4
Adrian Holmes	Robert April	Recurring	Recurring	Guest	
Dan Jeannotte	George Samuel "Sam" Kirk	Recurring	Recurring	Recurring	Guest
Gia Sandhu	T'Pring	Recurring	Guest		Guest
Melanie Scrofano	Marie Batel	Recurring	Recurring	Recurring	
Paul Wesley	James T. Kirk	Guest	Recurring	Recurring	Recurring
Carol Kane	Pelia		Recurring	Recurring	Recurring
Cillian O'Sullivan	Roger Korby			Recurring	
Mynor Luken	Beto Ortegas			Recurring	
Chris Myers	Dana Gamble			Recurring	

== Main characters ==
=== Christopher Pike ===
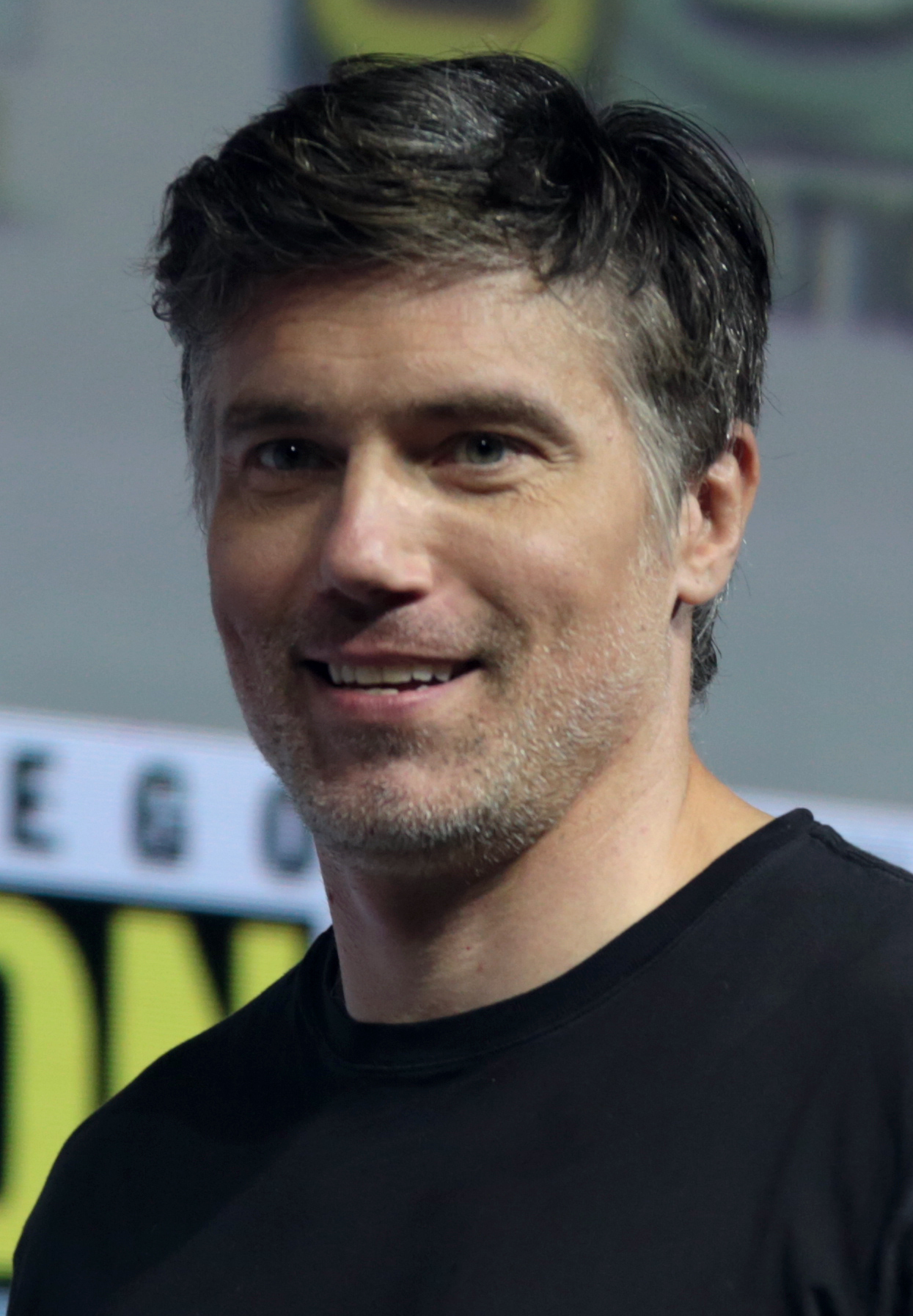
Anson Mount stars in Strange New Worlds as Captain Christopher Pike.

Christopher Pike (portrayed by Anson Mount) is the captain of the USS Enterprise (NCC-1701), who learned in the second season of Star Trek: Discovery (2019) that he will suffer a horrible fate.

Pike was first portrayed by Jeffrey Hunter in Star Trek: The Original Series (1966–1969) as a "gruff, authoritative commander" whom Mount described as "first act Pike... a very young man [who is] very self-involved". In contrast, Mount's "second act Pike" is confident, collaborative, and empathetic. Co-showrunner Akiva Goldsman believed that a "more thoughtful and contemporary approach" was required to avoid the toxic masculinity of some previous Star Trek captains, and Mount said his Pike represented "true masculinity". Inspired by Mount's own leadership style, Pike's quarters include a kitchen where he convenes the crew, cooks for them, and builds consensus. In the first-season finale, "A Quality of Mercy", Pike sees a future where he is spared his fate but Spock is injured instead. Goldsman said the episode was about changing Pike's fate from a curse to a choice, and Mount said Pike was more resolute and free after deciding not to try to change his future. Pike's hairstyle was widely commented on, drawing comparisons to Elvis Presley and the title character of the animated series Johnny Bravo (1997–2004), spawning Internet memes and its own fan-run Twitter account, and being called "the best hair quiff on television". Mount enjoyed this and attributed the style to "hair guru" Daniel Losco.

=== Spock ===
Spock (portrayed by Ethan Peck) is a half-Vulcan, half-human science officer aboard the Enterprise.

The series takes the opportunity to explore Spock's human emotions before he becomes the more "computer-like" version portrayed by Leonard Nimoy in The Original Series. Peck said he was "constantly checking in" with Nimoy's portrayal, and scenes exploring Spock's emotions were "a constant source of anxiety" for him to get right. Strange New Worlds expands on the complicated relationship between Spock and his fiancée, T'Pring; co-showrunner Henry Alonso Myers acknowledged that they interpreted The Original Series differently from what fans had previously done to expand on T'Pring's role in this stage of Spock's life. The series also explores a romance between Spock and Christine Chapel, who Peck said was one of Spock's "great teachers about his humanness". As a Vulcan, the character is portrayed with pointed ears and slanted eyebrows. Legacy Effects re-designed the prosthetics for Spock's ears and eyebrows to be closer to those used on Nimoy than the ones used on Peck for Discovery. Prosthetics department head Chris Bridges convinced Peck to shave his eyebrows, which he chose not to do on Discovery, to improve the application process and reduce the time it took from two hours to 70 minutes.

=== Christine Chapel ===
Christine Chapel (portrayed by Jess Bush) is a civilian nurse on the Enterprise.

Myers felt the character's portrayal by Majel Barrett in The Original Series came from a "very different conception of women and of marriage and what people would do in their jobs" that modern audiences would not expect, and sought to tell new stories inspired by Bush's strengths. Bush said the character had a "distinct essence" but also felt there was room to explore her youth and backstory; the actress focused on the character's "dry and sarcastic" personality and developed that into a sense of humor. She said Chapel first sees Spock as a "science subject" and is caught off guard when their relationship develops.

=== La'An Noonien-Singh ===
La'An Noonien-Singh (portrayed by Christina Chong) is the Enterprise's newly assigned chief of security, whose family was murdered by the lizard-like Gorn when she was a child.

Chong described the character as guarded and struggling with survivor's guilt but noted that she opens up as the series goes on and the crew of the Enterprise becomes her new family. Serving as security chief allows her to protect that family. La'An is also a descendant of the famous Star Trek villain Khan Noonien Singh, and has been discriminated against because of this. Chong related to this aspect of the character because she was bullied as a child for her ethnicity. The second season introduces a romance between La'An and an alternate version of James T. Kirk. Ava Cheung plays young La'An.

=== Nyota Uhura ===
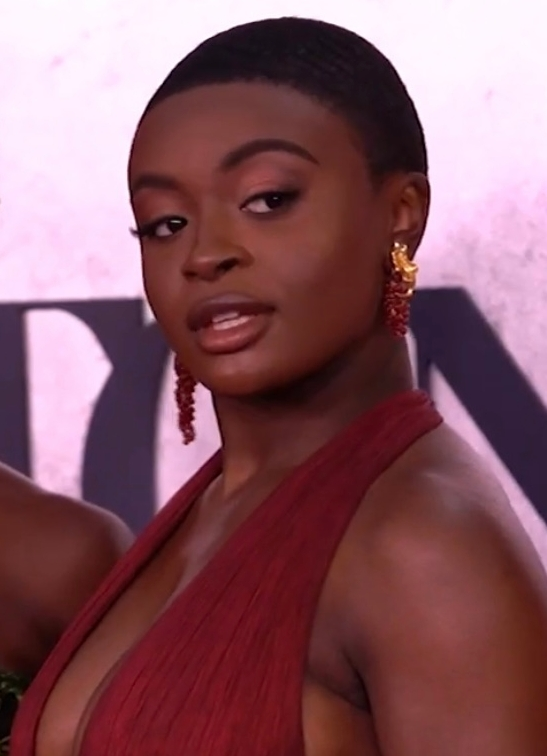
Celia Rose Gooding, in one of her first television roles, portrays Nyota Uhura.

Nyota Uhura (portrayed by Celia Rose Gooding) is introduced as a cadet on the Enterprise specializing in linguistics.

Despite Uhura's important role throughout the Star Trek franchise, the writers felt there was a lot still unknown about her that could be explored beyond her just being a Starfleet officer. As one of her first television roles, Gooding related to Uhura's experiences as a cadet who is learning about the Enterprise. The actress chose to keep her own natural hair rather than wear a wig to match previous Uhura actresses Nichelle Nichols and Zoe Saldaña because she felt they both represented the "black femininity" of their times and she could, too, with a modern look.

=== Erica Ortegas ===
Erica Ortegas (portrayed by Melissa Navia) is the Enterprise's helmsman.

Navia described Ortegas as a "highly skilled pilot [and] a veteran... she can handle a gun and also crack a joke". The actress compared Ortegas to one of her favorite Star Trek characters, Jonathan Frakes's William Riker. Navia worked with John Van Citters—the vice president of Star Trek brand management at CBS Studios—and the series' motion graphics team, who create the display for Ortegas's on-set control panel, to understand how to fly the Enterprise accurately. The surname is a reference to Jose Ortegas, a navigator in the original Star Trek pitch.

=== Joseph M'Benga ===
Joseph M'Benga (portrayed by Babs Olusanmokun) is the Enterprise's chief medical officer, who is secretly trying to cure his daughter, Rukiya, of a rare disease.

When Goldsman first discussed the character with Olusanmokun he said, "[M'Benga] was a man of war, and he's now a healer." Olusanmokun appreciated that description and chances to explore M'Benga's backstory as it is revealed. The actor researched combat medics for the second-season episode "Under the Cloak of War". Olusanmokun felt he was "crafting something anew" with his portrayal since M'Benga only appears in two episodes of The Original Series. The character was not given a first name in that series, but was referred to as Joseph in the script for the unproduced episode "Shol". Posters at the 2022 Star Trek: Mission Chicago convention referred to him as "Jabilo", a name used in some non-canon novels, but the producers soon stated that this was incorrect and the name Joseph was eventually used in Strange New Worlds.

=== Hemmer ===
Hemmer (portrayed by Bruce Horak) is the Enterprise's chief engineer.

Hemmer is an Aenar, an albino subspecies of Andorians who are generally depicted as blind; Horak is blind in one eye with limited sight in the other, and the first legally blind regular actor in a Star Trek series. The writers always intended for Hemmer to die in the first season as a way to increase the series' stakes, since most of the main characters are still alive in The Original Series. Horak was told about this when he was first cast and hoped to build the character into a "fan favorite". He compared the role to the Star Wars character Obi-Wan Kenobi, serving as a mentor to the young Uhura. He added that Hemmer's death would not be the end of his involvement in the series; Horak returned as Hemmer for a recording that Uhura watches in the second season. Horak's Aenar prosthetics took three-and-a-half hours to apply each morning. The character's original design included contact lenses to give Hemmer white eyes, but Horak found them painful to wear and an eye specialist suggested that Horak not risk further damage to his sight. His eyes were digitally altered by the visual effects team instead.

=== Number One ===
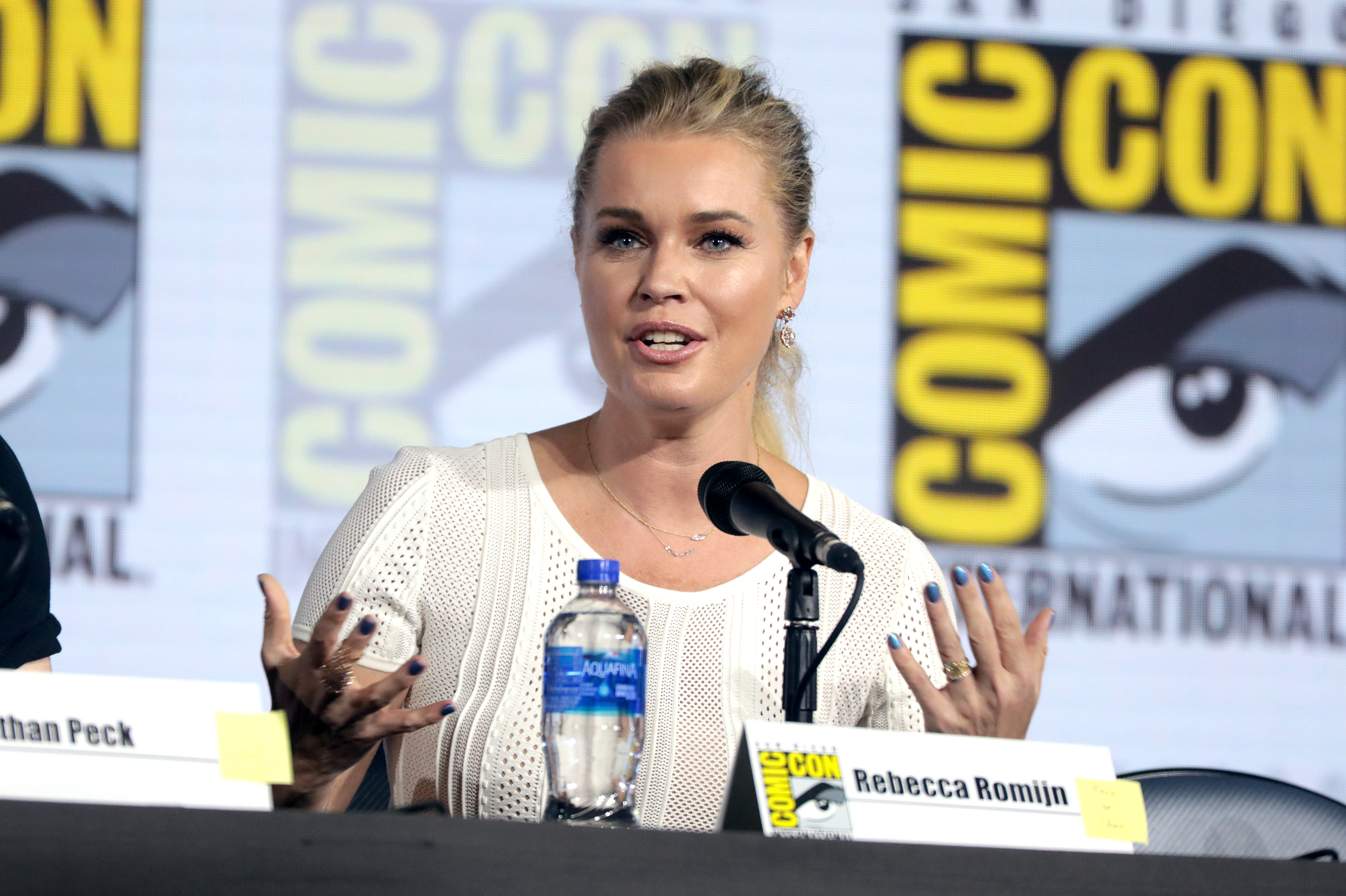
Rebecca Romijn portrays Number One in Strange New Worlds.

Una Chin-Riley / Number One (portrayed by Rebecca Romijn) is the first officer of the Enterprise and second-in-command to Pike.

The character was only referred to as "Number One" in The Original Series, where she was also portrayed by Majel Barrett, but she was given the name Una Chin-Riley in non-canon Star Trek novels. Strange New Worlds brings this name into official Star Trek canon. The series confirms that Number One is an Illyrian, which Original Series writer D.C. Fontana established in the novel Vulcan's Glory (1989), and reveals that Illyrians genetically modify themselves. This explains why Number One appears human while the Illyrians seen in the Star Trek: Enterprise episode "Damage" (2004) do not, and also aligns with the description of Illyrians practicing "selective breeding" in Greg Cox's novel Child of Two Worlds (2015). The Strange New Worlds writers believed it would be interesting for Number One to be at odds with Starfleet's anti-genetic alteration laws. The first season ends with Number One being arrested for being an Illyrian, and the showrunners said they did not know how they would resolve this story when they added the cliffhanger. They were glad when the writers came up with a "straight-down-the-middle classic Trek episode" to address it in the second season, referring to the courtroom episode "Ad Astra per Aspera". Anna Claire Beitel plays young Una.

=== Montgomery "Scotty" Scott ===
Montgomery "Scotty" Scott (portrayed by Martin Quinn) is a Starfleet engineer.

Scotty has a cameo appearance in the first-season finale, but this was kept offscreen because the producers were not ready to cast a new actor. Matthew Wolf provided the voice for the cameo and was credited as "Engineer". The character is fully introduced in the second-season finale. Following the controversial Scottish accents used by Canadian actor James Doohan in The Original Series and English actor Simon Pegg in several Star Trek films, the showrunners wanted to cast an actual Scottish actor and looked at 30 to 50 different actors before Quinn was hired. He chose not to do an impression of Doohan, and worked with the writers to make the character more authentically Scottish. Quinn said Scotty was "not quite the miracle worker" he is known as in The Original Series and has a lot of learning to do before he reaches that point.

== Recurring characters ==
=== Robert April ===
Robert April (portrayed by Adrian Holmes) is a Starfleet admiral and the Enterprise's first captain who is a mentor to Pike.

April first appeared in the Star Trek: The Animated Series episode "The Counter-Clock Incident" (1974), which depicted him as an older white man voiced by white actor James Doohan. Additionally, the likeness of Star Trek creator Gene Roddenberry, also white, was used by Michael Okuda to create a photograph of April in The Star Trek Encyclopedia (1994). Explaining why Holmes, a black man, was cast in the role for Strange New Worlds, Myers said he and the other producers liked Holmes's performance and felt he had the gravitas to fill the character's "mythic" role. Myers also did not think that casting a black man would be a controversial change or take away from the character's appearance in The Animated Series. Okuda and "The Counter-Clock Incident" writer Fred Bronson both praised the casting of Holmes.

=== Sam Kirk ===
George Samuel "Sam" Kirk Jr. (portrayed by Dan Jeannotte) is a life sciences officer aboard the Enterprise and elder brother to future captain James T. Kirk.

Myers said Sam and James Kirk are very different characters and the series would explore their complex relationship. Sam Kirk briefly appeared as a dead body in the Original Series episode "Operation -- Annihilate!" (1967), portrayed by James Kirk actor William Shatner with a fake mustache; Jeannotte's version retains the mustache.

=== T'Pring ===
T'Pring (portrayed by Gia Sandhu) is Spock's fiancée, with whom he has been bonded since childhood.

Myers said T'Pring was "fun, and thoughtful, and interesting", and including her in the series allowed Spock to be explored in new ways. Sandhu replaced Arlene Martel, who portrayed T'Pring in the Original Series episode "Amok Time" (1967), and Sandhu said she was mostly able to develop T'Pring herself due to the character's limited prior screen time. The first episode's script described T'Pring as wearing "ritual mating colors", so costume designer Bernadette Croft took inspiration from the silver and purple costumes worn at Spock and T'Pring's wedding in "Amok Time". For Spock's dream sequence in "Spock Amok", which foreshadows the "Amok Time" wedding, Sandhu wears a dress by Dutch fashion designer Iris van Herpen which Croft described as "wearable art". The dress was laser cut and glued onto mesh, and paired with an elaborate custom headpiece.

=== Marie Batel ===
Marie Batel (portrayed by Melanie Scrofano) is a Starfleet captain and Pike's girlfriend.

=== James T. Kirk ===
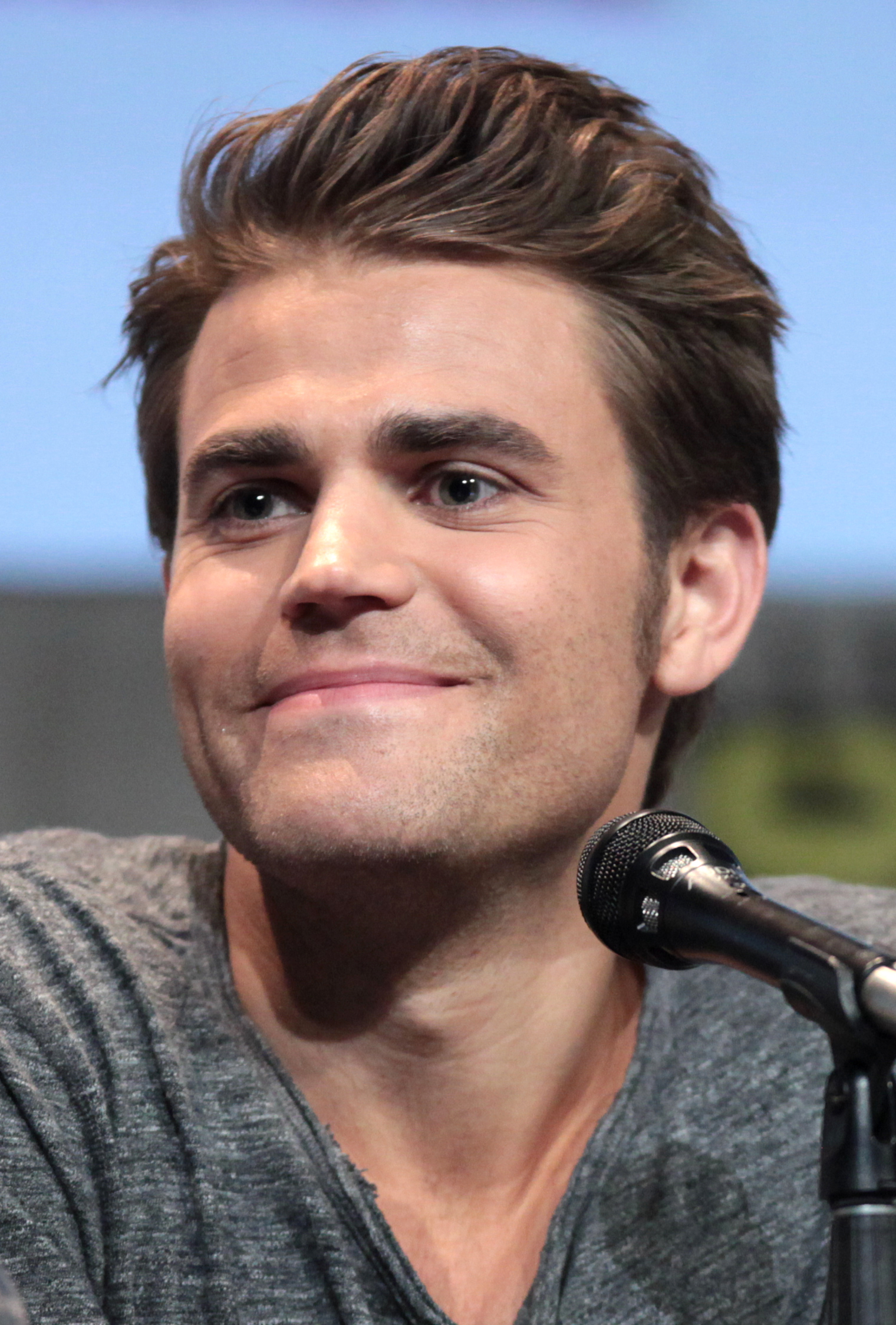
Guest star Paul Wesley has a recurring role as future captain James T. Kirk.

James Tiberius Kirk (portrayed by Paul Wesley) is Sam Kirk's younger brother and the future captain of the Enterprise.

Wesley's casting for the second season was announced before the premiere of the first, after he was spotted filming on location in Toronto. Myers said they did not want to "leave a story on the table" and decided to explore a young Kirk after already exploring other The Original Series characters such as Spock, Uhura, and Chapel. Following multiple unsuccessful auditions with other actors, Myers and Goldsman approached Wesley and hired him after just having a conversation. The actor made a surprise first appearance as Kirk during the first-season finale where he played an alternate version from a potential future that Pike visits. He played a different alternate version in the second-season episode "Tomorrow and Tomorrow and Tomorrow", one from a dark timeline who has never been to Earth. Wesley did not want to imitate The Original Series star William Shatner, but said his portrayal of a younger Kirk in the second season would be closer to Shatner's than his portrayal of the alternate versions. Coincidentally, Wesley was once neighbors with Shatner, and the pair happened to share a plane ride around the time Wesley's casting was announced; Shatner gave Wesley his blessing. "Lost in Translation" depicts the first canonical meetings between James Kirk and key characters such as Pike, Spock, and Uhura.

=== Pelia ===
Pelia (portrayed by Carol Kane) replaces Hemmer as the Enterprise's chief engineer in the second season. The character is a Lanthanite, a species not introduced in the Star Trek universe previously, that appears human externally but whose members can live for millennia; Pelia suggests in the series that she is 5,000 years old. Kane chose to create an accent to differentiate her character, so the audience would not be able to work out where she comes from. She did this in a table read of the second-season premiere, held over Zoom, and the producers responded positively. The name "Lanthanide" comes from a group of minerals.

=== Roger Korby ===
Roger Korby (portrayed by Cillian O'Sullivan) is a renowned archaeologist and scientist who gets engaged to Chapel.

Korby was first portrayed by Michael Strong in the Original Series episode "What Are Little Girls Made Of?" (1966). O'Sullivan, who is Irish, auditioned for the character using his own accent as well as British and American accents. Despite American actor Strong using his natural accent for the role, and O'Sullivan wanting to use a British accent, Goldsman decided that the character should have an Irish accent in Strange New Worlds. O'Sullivan said the updated take on Korby was inspired by Bush's updated take on Chapel and wanting him to be a "good match" for her.

=== Beto Ortegas ===
Umberto "Beto" Ortegas (portrayed by Mynor Luken) is a documentarian and Erica Ortegas's younger brother.

=== Dana Gamble ===
Dana Gamble (portrayed by Chris Myers) is a medical ensign who joins the Enterprise when Chapel leaves for her fellowship.

== Guest characters ==
=== Introduced in other media ===
- Amanda Grayson (portrayed by Mia Kirshner) is Spock's human mother. Kirshner was first cast as the character, who was introduced in The Original Series, for Discovery.
- Beckett Mariner (portrayed by Tawny Newsome) is an ensign on the USS Cerritos in the 24th century who travels back in time. Newsome reprised her role from the animated series Star Trek: Lower Decks (2020–2024).
- Brad Boimler (portrayed by Jack Quaid) is an ensign on the Cerritos in the 24th century who travels back in time. Quaid reprised his role from Lower Decks.
- D'Vana Tendi (voiced by Noël Wells) is an ensign on the Cerritos in the 24th century. Wells reprised her role from Lower Decks.
- Sam Rutherford (voiced by Eugene Cordero) is an ensign on the Cerritos in the 24th century. Cordero reprised his role from Lower Decks.
- Jack Ransom (voiced by Jerry O'Connell) is first officer of the Cerritos in the 24th century. O'Connell reprised his role from Lower Decks.
- Q (voiced by John de Lancie) is an extradimensional being and the father of Trelane. De Lancie reprised his role from various Star Trek media.
- Trelane (portrayed by Rhys Darby) is a child-like extradimensional being. The character was portrayed by William Campbell in the Original Series episode "The Squire of Gothos" (1967).

=== Introduced in the first season ===
- A leader on the planet Kiley 279 (portrayed by Samantha Smith)
- Alora (portrayed by Lindy Booth) is a leader on the planet Majalis and an old flame of Pike's.
- The First Servant (portrayed by Ian Ho) is a boy on Majalis who was selected at birth to be sacrificed to the machine that runs the paradise-like planet.
- Gamal (portrayed by Huse Madhavji) is the biological father of the First Servant who tries to save his son from the Majalis machine.
- Angel (portrayed by Jesse James Keitel) is a nonbinary pirate captain and the lover of Spock's half-brother Sybok who poses as Dr. Aspen, a Starfleet counselor.

=== Introduced in the second season ===
- Neera Ketoul (portrayed by Yetide Badaki) is an Illyrian attorney and childhood friend of Number One's who defends the latter during her trial.
- Sera (portrayed by Adelaide Kane) is a time-traveling Romulan who creates a dark alternate timeline by changing events in the past.
- Luq (portrayed by Reed Birney) is a worker on Rigel VII who helps the Enterprise crew.
- Zac Nguyen (portrayed by David Huynh) is Pike's former yeoman who was presumed dead on a mission to Rigel VII, but survived and became a despotic ruler.
- Sevet (portrayed by Michael Benyaer) is T'Pring's father, who is easily swayed by his protocol-driven wife.
- T'Pril (portrayed by Ellora Patnaik) is T'Pring's strict and disapproving mother.
- Ramon (portrayed by Michael Reventar) is a Starfleet lieutenant working at the Bavali Station deuterium refinery who is driven mad by contact from unknown lifeforms.
- Harr Caras (portrayed by Greg Bryk) is the captain of an Orion science vessel that attempts to steal a time portal.
- Garkog (portrayed by Bruce Horak) is a Klingon general who is affected by the music reality in "Subspace Rhapsody". The showrunners wanted to find a fun way to bring Horak back again after Hemmer's death.
- Dak'Rah (portrayed by Robert Wisdom) is a Klingon general from M'Benga's past known as "the Butcher of J'Gal" who has become the Federation's ambassador to the Klingons.
- Buck Martinez (portrayed by Clint Howard) is the chief medical officer at a Starfleet hospital where M'Benga and Chapel are stationed during the Klingon War.

=== Introduced in the third season ===
- Bytha (portrayed by Christine Horn) is the daughter of Dak'Rah who seeks to kill M'Benga to restore her house's honor.
- Trunn Voor (portrayed by Shaun Majumder) is the captain of a Lutani warship who seeks to use the Jikaru creature as a weapon of war.

== Co-stars ==
=== Introduced in other media ===
- Kyle (portrayed by André Dae Kim) is the Enterprise's transporter chief. Kim replaced The Original Series actor John Winston in the role.
- The Enterprise's computer is voiced by Alex Kapp, replacing Majel Barrett who voiced the computer in The Original Series.
- Stonn (portrayed by Roderick McNeil) is a Vulcan colleague of T'Pring's. The character was portrayed by Lawrence Montaigne in the Original Series episode "Amok Time".
- A Romulan commander (portrayed by Matthew MacFadzean) from an alternate future that Pike visits. The character was portrayed by Mark Lenard in the Original Series episode "Balance of Terror" (1966).
- A Romulan sub-commander (portrayed by Mathieu Bourassa) from an alternate future that Pike visits. The character was portrayed by Lawrence Montaigne in the Original Series episode "Balance of Terror".
- Hansen Al-Salah (portrayed by Ali Hassan) is a Starfleet commander from an alternate future that Pike visits. The character was portrayed by Garry Walberg in the Original Series episode "Balance of Terror".
- Khan Noonien Singh (portrayed by Desmond Sivan) is a genetically-enhanced boy from the 21st century who will go on to be a villainous warlord portrayed by Ricardo Montalban in other Star Trek media.

=== Introduced in the first season ===
- Jenna Mitchell (portrayed by Rong Fu) is the operations officer on the Enterprise.
- Christina (portrayed by Jennifer Hui) is an ensign on the Enterprise.
- The Shepherd Captain (portrayed by Thom Marriott) escorts the comet M'hanit which he believes is an ancient arbiter of life. The Shepherd was created with animatronics and prosthetics.
- Rukiya (portrayed by Sage Arrindell as a child and Makambe Simamba as an adult) is M'Benga's daughter, who suffers from a rare disease.
- Manu (portrayed by Cameron Roberts) is La'An's brother, seen in flashbacks to their time as captives of the Gorn.
- Buckley (portrayed by Carlos Albornoz) is an alien that gets infected with Gorn eggs. Buckley was created with animatronics and prosthetics.
- Oriana (portrayed by Emma Ho) is a young girl who the Enterprise crew save from the Gorn. La'An helps Oriana find her parents.

=== Introduced in the second season ===
- Jay (portrayed by Noah Lamanna) replaces Kyle as transporter chief after Kim left to star in the series Vampire Academy (2022).
- Una's father (portrayed by Jim Annan) is seen in flashbacks to her childhood.
- Una's mother (portrayed by Catherine Black) is seen in flashbacks to her childhood.
- Ymaly (portrayed by Allison Wilson-Forbes) is an agent of the Department of Temporal Investigations who visits La'An.
- The grey-suited man (portrayed by Christopher Wyllie) is an agent of the Department of Temporal Investigations who gives a time-travel device to La'An.
- Yellow and Blue (voiced by Anjuli Cain) are non-corporeal Kerkhovians who alter Spock's DNA.
