= Star Trek: Strange New Worlds season 4 =

Star Trek: Strange New Worlds
- Season 4
- Promotional poster
- Showrunners: Akiva Goldsman; Henry Alonso Myers
- Starring: Anson Mount; Ethan Peck; Jess Bush; Christina Chong; Celia Rose Gooding; Melissa Navia; Babs Olusanmokun; Martin Quinn; Rebecca Romijn
- No. of episodes: 10

Release
- Original network: Paramount+
- Original release: July 23 – September 24, 2026

Season chronology
- ← Previous; Season 3 Next → Season 5

The fourth season of the American television series Star Trek: Strange New Worlds follows Captain Christopher Pike and the crew of the starship Enterprise in the 23rd century as they explore new worlds and carry out missions during the decade before Star Trek: The Original Series (1966–1969). The season is being produced by CBS Studios in association with Secret Hideout, Weed Road Pictures, H M R X Productions, and Roddenberry Entertainment, with Akiva Goldsman and Henry Alonso Myers as showrunners.

Anson Mount, Ethan Peck, and Rebecca Romijn respectively star as Pike, Spock, and Number One, along with Jess Bush, Christina Chong, Celia Rose Gooding, Melissa Navia, Babs Olusanmokun, and Martin Quinn. Many of the regular actors and several guest stars portray younger versions of characters from The Original Series. A fourth season of Strange New Worlds was ordered in April 2024. Filming took place at CBS Stages Canada in Mississauga, Ontario, from March to August 2025. The showrunners continued the series' episodic storytelling approach, giving each episode a different genre and tone. This includes a puppet episode, with puppet work by Jim Henson's Creature Shop.

The season premiered on the streaming service Paramount+ on July 23, 2026. The rest of the 10-episode run was released weekly until September 24. It received generally positive reviews from critics. A fifth and final season was ordered in June 2025.

== Episodes ==
No. overall	No. in season	Title	Directed by	Written by	Original release date
31	1	"Valles Marineris"	Chris Fisher	Teleplay by : Akiva Goldsman & Henry Alonso Myers; Story by : Henry Alonso Myers & Alan B. McElroy	July 23, 2026
Captain Christopher Pike is offered a promotion to commodore. The USS Enterprise is caught in a solar storm which sends them back 65 million years to the Cretaceous period on Earth, where crew members encounter dinosaurs. The Enterprise is captured by Martians who are at war with the Dol'drm, an insect-like species from a planet between Mars and Jupiter. Pike offers to help end the conflict peacefully, but their leader, Commander Cassell, learns that Mars is a barren wasteland in the future and decides to use the Enterprise's antimatter fuel cell as a weapon. The crew race to stop Cassell from using it against the Dol'drm planet, but Pike makes a last minute decision not to interfere. The planet is destroyed, creating the asteroid belt and shifting Mars's orbit enough to cause its eventual wasteland state. A fragment from the explosion becomes the Chichxulub asteroid that causes the dinosaurs' extinction. The Enterprise uses the explosion's energy to return to their own time, in which Pike declines the promotion and instead has first officer Una Chin-Riley / Number One promoted to commander.
32	2	"The Griffin Incident"	Axelle Carolyn	Robbie Thompson	July 30, 2026
Returning on a shuttle from a leadership conference, James Kirk, Spock, and La'An come across the derelict ship USS Griffin, which had disappeared nine years earlier. They detect no life signs and beam aboard to investigate. They begin seeing anomalous activity, including a suspicious woman walking the halls. Spock becomes trapped in the medical bay after the computer informs him that most of the crew was killed after being beamed into empty space, and sees visions of T'Pring. Kirk tries to communicate with the USS Enterprise crew, but is distracted when he hears his infant son crying. La'An sees the video logs of the ship's chief of security, Rose Harper, who she realizes killed all of the crew, and is the woman walking through the halls. The crew of the Enterprise apparently beams aboard to rescue them, but begins acting strangely. La'An becomes possessed and stabs Kirk in the stomach. The real Enterprise arrives and rescues them, never having boarded the Griffin. They refer the Griffin to Division 12, which tows the ship away. Kirk attempts to contact his family, and La'An watches the towing of the Griffin from the Enterprise, seeing Harper behind a window.
33	3	"Human Best Friend"	Yana Gorskaya	Kathryn Lyn	August 6, 2026
Tensions are high on the overworked Enterprise, particularly between Montgomery Scott and Ortegas. Pike decides to send the primary shift to a resort where the atmosphere causes an allegedly safe and temporary release of inhibitions. Just as they arrive, Ortegas and Scott find themselves together with a gap in their memory, with instructions to deliver a message to Pike. Working together, they need to first recover their stolen shuttlecraft and then deal with a bomb planted there before it destroys the Enterprise and sabotages important negotiations. Their colleagues are of little help: Pike gets a tattoo, Number One sings Klingon power ballads, M'Benga takes up bartending, and La'An and Chapel disrupt an exercise class and a bingo game respectively. Spock seems less affected, but is unburdening himself with what he believes to be a hallucination of Kirk. They get the shuttlecraft and bomb off the ship, and Spock (with the help of Kirk, who turns out to be have been real all along) beams them out just before the explosion.
34	4	"A Case of Chiaroscuro"	Meera Menon	Skylar Ojeda & Dana Horgan	August 13, 2026
Number One, M'Benga, and Uhura enter the Klingon-occupied Mat'aar system on a shuttlecraft to recover a missing Starfleet probe. They succeed, but are detected and need to hide on the main planet, where color perception is blocked and the residents dress like those in 1940s Earth. Due to a fortuitous resemblance, Number One assumes the role of Nevette, a Mat'aaran who is both a prominent collaborator and the leader of a sophisticated Mat'aaran resistance organization. Uhura is arrested and interrogated by Kor, the local commander, and is later released but learns the current Klingon plan. Over M'Benga's advice, Number One carries out Nevette's previous plan to disrupt that plan and allow some Mat'aarans to escape the planet. On the Enterprise, La'An suspects that the recovered probe has been sabotaged. It hasn't, but her investigation finds two other covert transmissions, one of which involves Chapel covering up an illegal mercy mission by a Starfleet hospital ship. La'An agrees not to reveal this.
35	5	"Level-Five Transporter Accident"	Jordan Canning	Henry Alonso Myers & Dana Horgan	August 20, 2026
As Scott prepares an experiment to extend the transporter's range, La'An breaks off her relationship with Spock, and the latter invites T'Pring to visit the Enterprise to help him rededicate himself to logic. As Spock watches from a shuttlecraft, the experiment causes the ship to briefly vanish, then return with everyone on board transformed into puppets. Returning, Spock finds himself the only person able to operate most of the controls. An Orion party board the ship and easily take over the bridge, but Pike formulates a plan to recapture the ship, using the special advantages of their new form. A chaotic mass attack distracts the Orions long enough for Spock to remove the oxygen from the bridge, disabling both the Orions and himself. Scott is able to reverse the effect, but the crew first enjoy visiting open space without suits. Spock awakens to T'Pring who confirms it was a dream Spock had while rendered unconscious following the original experiment.
36	6	"Off-Hour"	Dan Liu	Bill Wolkoff	August 27, 2026
Chapel and M'Benga have friction when she learns that he is considering leaving the ship and he points out that she herself has never committed permanently to the ship. The Enterprise is pulled into a slipstream while at warp that causes widespread damage and disables communications, and they have less than an hour before the ship will be destroyed. In the chaos, M'Benga suffers a fatal injury, but Chapel discovers an experimental theory of his that may save his life. A theoretical form of neutrinos may be able to repair his injuries, and Scott believes the neutrinos could also save the ship. The crew manages to collect the neutrinos and confirm the theory, saving both M'Benga and the ship, and Chapel requests permanent assignment to the Enterprise with Captain Pike.
37	7	"Like Chronitons Through the Hourglass"	Anna Dokoza	Dana Horgan & Bill Wolkoff	September 3, 2026
A bandaged Pike wakes up in sickbay. M'Benga says that two weeks ago, a shuttlecraft accident left Pike with amnesia and Spock in a coma so that he requires a "live heart transplant". Pike visits the ship's counselor but is interrupted by Uhura, who has just learned that she is Pike's daughter. The strange events and odd melodramatic speech of his colleagues lead Pike to suspect that supernatural entities may be involved, and he soon learns that Trelane has imprisoned the crew in a soap opera, for his academic project to study human emotion. Meanwhile, La'An has captured Spock's half-brother Sybok to use as a heart donor. Sybok escapes her, but decides to donate anyway after an emotional speech from La'An. While attempting to resolve his family drama with Uhura, Pike instead meets Juliet, Pike's daughter from the full happy life he experienced with Marie. Juliet says "just because it didn't happen doesn't mean that it wasn't real", as they reconcile. Both Trelane and his supervisor are moved by the genuine emotion, so she approves his project and the ship is restored to normal. Spock and La'An remain as friends, and Pike consults the counselor to deal with his grief.
38	8	"Orders of Magnitude"	Sharon Lewis	Alan B. McElroy	September 10, 2026
Pike's landing party beam down, following a possible distress call, and enter a cave where they are out of contact. Just then, Admiral Reeger takes command of the ship to follow traces of a cloaked ship, believed to have killed millions in a previous attack, placing the visiting James Kirk as first officer. They track the ship to a planet with 5,000 inhabitants, and Reeger orders the Enterprise to eliminate all life there. When Kirk questions this and then attempts to contact Starfleet covertly, Reeger sends him to the brig, where he escapes from La'An and consults with M'Benga (who served with Reeger and also Kirk's father). Meanwhile, in the cave, the call was faked by Andorian pirates who capture the party and demand Starfleet command codes. Uhura pretends to comply, but instead uses their equipment to disable and then singlehandedly defeat them. Kirk is recaptured, claims to have sabotaged the phasers, and goads Reeger into such irrationality that M'Benga relieves him. Later M'Benga confesses to drugging Reeger with cordrazine, risking his career, though actually Kirk did this. Uhura is promoted to Lieutenant (JG), though she regrets that her mentee A'Sha (stabbed by the pirates) plans to leave Starfleet.
39	9	"Once La'An a Time"	Sydney Freeland	Onitra Johnson	September 17, 2026
While La'An struggles with psychological issues caused by her Augment DNA, the Enterprise encounters a mysterious disc-shaped world traveling through space. La'An accompanies Pike, Spock and Pelia on an exploration mission on the planet, which turns out to be the Elysian Kingdom, created by Dr M'Benga's sick daughter, and populated by fantasy versions of the Enterprise crew. After the expedition is captured, La'An reluctantly poses as Princess Thalia, who is challenging the tyrannical Queen Neve. While Pike and Spock's fantasy alter egos beam aboard the Enterprise (and use the latter's magic to pose as their originals) to escape Neve, Pelia poses as the fantasy author Benny Russell. Neve transforms herself into a dragon and pursues Pike and Spock, leading to a brief space skirmish with the Enterprise. After Kirk's fantasy alter ego is transformed into a werewolf, La'An battles her fantasy alter ego and makes peace with her inner struggle. Spock's alter ego uses magic to kill Neve, and Thalia gifts La'An with her dog named Runa. Pelia remains with the habitat to bring it to port.
40	10	"Tomorrow's Enterprise"	Chris Fisher	Henry Alonso Myers & Robbie Thompson	September 24, 2026
The Enterprise is sent to study a white hole when an explosion occurs. Uhura encounters a duplicate of herself, who reveals that she is from one year in the future, when Pike has become admiral, and James Kirk has become captain and begun the Enterprise's next five-year mission starting with investigating a black hole. Both Uhuras learn that Mr. Scott has been killed in the explosion, and work with each other and Spock across time to resolve the situation. The nature of the explosion and temporal anomaly is revealed to be caused by an entity of pure energy being 'birthed' between the two singularities, which the crew dubs a 'space baby'. The alien's caretakers restore the timeline, and both Uhuras bid each other farewell.

== Cast and characters ==
=== Main ===
- Anson Mount as Christopher Pike
- Ethan Peck as Spock
- Jess Bush as Christine Chapel
- Christina Chong as La'An Noonien-Singh
- Celia Rose Gooding as Nyota Uhura
- Melissa Navia as Erica Ortegas
- Babs Olusanmokun as Joseph M'Benga
- Martin Quinn as Montgomery Scott
- Rebecca Romijn as Una Chin-Riley / Number One

=== Recurring ===
- Carol Kane as Pelia
- Bianca Nugara as A'Sha
- Paul Wesley as James T. Kirk

=== Notable guests ===
- Adrian Holmes as Robert April
- Dan Jeannotte as George Samuel "Sam" Kirk
- Brian Markinson as Dr. Philip Boyce
- Joe Morton as Admiral Simon Reeger
- Saffron Burrows as Commander Cassel
- Rachael Harris as Captain Ch'Rol
- Deidre Hall as Dr. Eleanor Chivers
- Rhys Darby as Trelane

== Production ==
=== Development ===
Executive producer Alex Kurtzman envisioned Star Trek: Strange New Worlds, a spin-off from the series Star Trek: Discovery (2017–2024), as an ongoing series that could cover the seven years between Discovery's second season (2019) and the accident that seriously injures Christopher Pike in Star Trek: The Original Series (1966–1969). Co-showrunner Akiva Goldsman hoped Strange New Worlds would continue until it caught up with the events of The Original Series. Following the success of Strange New Worlds's second season, Paramount+ ordered a fourth season in April 2024 while the third season was in production.

=== Writing ===
The writers' room was underway and had settled on the ideas for all 10 episodes of the season by the end of July 2024, including an episode where the crew are portrayed by puppets. Goldsman had teased such an episode in March 2024, when he expressed doubt that there was a genre or story that the series could not include: "Could it do Muppets? Sure. Could it do black and white, silent, slapstick? Maybe!" When the season's puppet episode was announced in July 2025, Goldsman explained: "There might have been an unexpected and terrible transporter accident which might have had some unexpected felt-like effects."

=== Casting ===
Anson Mount, Ethan Peck, and Rebecca Romijn star in the series as Captain Christopher Pike, science officer Spock, and first officer Una Chin-Riley / Number One, respectively. Also starring are Jess Bush as nurse Christine Chapel, Christina Chong as chief security officer La'An Noonien-Singh, Celia Rose Gooding as communications officer Nyota Uhura, Melissa Navia as helmsman Erica Ortegas, Babs Olusanmokun as Dr. Joseph M'Benga, and Martin Quinn as engineer Montgomery Scott.

Paul Wesley, who replaced The Original Series star William Shatner as James T. Kirk for the series, said in September 2024 that he would again have a role in the fourth season. After filming began, Adrian Holmes and Dan Jeannotte confirmed that they were reprising their recurring guest roles as Robert April and George Samuel "Sam" Kirk, respectively, in the fourth season. In October 2025, Carol Kane was confirmed to be returning in her recurring guest role as Pelia. Saffron Burrows guest-starred in the season premiere as Martian Commander Cassell.

=== Filming ===
After completing work on the third season in May 2024, Mount said filming for the fourth season was expected to begin in Canada in early 2025. Filming began on March 3, 2025, at CBS Stages Canada in Mississauga, Ontario, under the working title Lily and Isaac. Director Axelle Carolyn was in Toronto by March 18, and began filming the fourth episode on March 31. In the week of May 5, filming took place at the Cotton Factory, an historic industrial complex in Hamilton, Ontario. Filming took place inside the complex and in an alleyway, and made use of two 1930s-style trucks with alien writing on them. Jordan Canning was directing the fifth episode by June 26, and was halfway through the episode on July 7. Canning directed the puppet episode, with puppet work provided by Jim Henson's Creature Shop. Canning previously worked with the company on the series Fraggle Rock: Back to the Rock (2022–2024). Filming for the season took place until August 29. Frequent Star Trek director Jonathan Frakes was originally expecting to direct an episode, but was unable to due scheduling conflicts with his work on the series Star Trek: Starfleet Academy (2026–present).

== Marketing ==
During a Star Trek Universe panel at San Diego Comic-Con in July 2025, a short teaser was shown which revealed that an episode of the fourth season would portray the crew with puppets. Several commentators suggested that the series was again copying the Buffyverse franchise following the second season's musical episode "Subspace Rhapsody", pointing to Buffy the Vampire Slayer's musical episode "Once More, with Feeling" (2001) and spin-off series Angel's puppet episode "Smile Time" (2004). William Hughes at The A. V. Club felt the idea of a puppet episode had lost its impact after several other series had done the concept. The season was also promoted at New York Comic Con in October, at another "Star Trek Universe" panel featuring Kurtzman, Goldsman, Myers, Peck, Gooding, Navia, and Quinn. A first-look clip for the season was released during the panel. Gizmodo's James Whitbrook said the serious first-look clip was in stark contrast with the previous puppet announcement, and felt it may have been chosen as a response to criticisms of the third season.

Romijn, Peck, Gooding, and Wesley promoted the season at CCXP Mexico in April 2026, announcing the release dates and debuting the first trailer. Whitbrook said the trailer, like the first-look clip, was trying to "strike a more serious balance" than the third season did, despite the inclusion of cowboys and dinosaurs. He noted that there were indications in the trailer that some main characters could die in the season. Lacy Baugher at Den of Geek similarly felt that the trailer was trying to show a pivot away from some of the "more out-there" elements of the third season that proved divisive among fans, with a focus on more traditional Star Trek adventures and setting up the end of the series. However, Baugher also acknowledged the dinosaur and the previously announced puppet episode, and said the series "will still march to the beat of its own drummer in its fourth season".

== Release ==
The season was released on the streaming service Paramount+ in the United States, Canada, the United Kingdom, Latin America, Australia, South Korea, Italy, France, Germany, Switzerland, and Austria. The season premiered on July 23, 2026. The rest of the 10-episode run was released weekly until September 24. The series is released in New Zealand on TVNZ, in India on Voot, and in other European countries on SkyShowtime (a combination of Paramount+ and the streaming service Peacock).

== Reception ==
On review aggregator website Rotten Tomatoes, 100% of 14 critics reviews were positive and the average of rated reviews was 7.5 out of 10. Metacritic, which uses a weighted average, assigned a score of 72 out of 100 based on 9 reviews, indicating a "generally favorable" response.
