= Bruce Horak =

Canadian actor (born 1974)

- Born: August 5, 1974 (age 52); Calgary, Alberta, Canada
- Education: Mount Royal University
- Occupations: Actor, painter
- Spouse: Rebecca Northan (divorced)

Bruce Horak (born August 5, 1974) is a Canadian artist and television and stage actor, known for portraying Hemmer on Star Trek: Strange New Worlds. Horak is the first legally blind actor to portray a character in the Star Trek franchise.

== Early life ==
Bruce Horak was born in Calgary, Alberta. At age 18 months, he was diagnosed with retinoblastoma, which caused him to lose his right eye and over 90% of the vision in his left eye. Horak's father, Karl Horak, was also visually impaired, having lost his left eye to disease. Horak developed an interest in writing and theater in third grade, when a theater company came to his school and put on a play.

Horak attended at Mount Royal University, where he studied theater. He also trained at the Loose Moose Theatre in Calgary.

== Career ==
=== Theatre ===
One of Horak's earliest plays was What You Can't See, in 1999, about a boy who hides his visual impairment. In 2001, he co-created The Canada Show, a comedic attempt to distill the history of Canada into a one-hour space. In 2005, he co-created the one-man show This is Cancer, described as a dark comedy. Horak also stars as Cancer in the play. He appeared in the role of Jake in a production of Evil Dead: The Musical in 2009. In 2019, he co-created Goblin: Macbeth, a play which imagines goblins finding the works of Shakespeare, and attempting to act out a play without fully understanding what they are doing.

=== Star Trek: Strange New Worlds ===
On Star Trek: Strange New Worlds, Horak plays Hemmer, the Aenar chief engineer aboard the Enterprise. The Aenar are a blind race in Star Trek, closely related to the Andorians, and the producers wanted a visually impaired actor to play the role of Hemmer. Horak, who describes himself as a Star Trek fan, eagerly auditioned for the role and won it. When Horak accepted the role, he was told Hemmer's character would have a limited run in Strange New Worlds. He appeared as Hemmer in six of the ten episodes of Season 1. He later appeared in one Season 2 episode in both a pre-recorded/flashback scene with Uhura and as an illusory Hemmer. In addition to Hemmer, Horak also played the Klingon commander General Garkog in Season 2's "Subspace Rhapsody".

=== Other work ===
Horak has painted hundreds of portraits, and has an aim to paint one thousand of them. In one of his plays, "Assassinating Thomson", he paints a portrait of the audience during the play. His paintings have been showcased at several Canadian galleries.

Horak recorded an album with Canadian artist Onalea Gilbertson under the name The Rail Birds. The album, called Intensive Care, was made available online in 2020.

== Awards and accolades ==
In September 2024, Horak was awarded the King Charles III Coronation Medal.

== Personal life ==
Horak was married to Rebecca Northan, whom he met while at Mount Royal. They did not remain married, but she has been his co-collaborator in many of his plays.

As of 2022, he resides in Stratford, Ontario.

== Filmography ==
=== Television ===
Year	Title	Role	Notes
2010	Warehouse 13	Philo Farnsworth	1 episode
2022	In the Dark	Brendan	2 episodes
2022–2023	Star Trek: Strange New Worlds	Hemmer, Garkog	8 episodes
2023	Transplant	Adam Viri	2 episodes
2023	Family History Mysteries: Buried Past	Clark	Television movie

=== Other ===
Year	Title	Role	Notes
2009	Gitch	Gitch	Short
2023	Star Trek: Very Short Treks	Hemmer (voice)	2 episodes
2024	Canada Heritage Minute	Edwin Baker	Short

== Awards and nominations ==
Year	Award	Category	Nominated work	Result	Ref.
2000	Betty Award	Outstanding New Play	What You Can't See / Quest Theatre	Nominated	
2007	Betty Award	Outstanding Performance by an Actor in a Comedy or Musical	This is Cancer / Alberta Theatre Projects	Won	
2009	Betty Award	Outstanding Performance by an Actor in a Comedy or Musical	Evil Dead – The Musical / Ground Zero Theatre / Hit and Myth Productions	Won	
2011	Betty Award	Outstanding Performance by an Actor in a Comedy or Musical	The Wizard of Oz / Alberta Theatre Projects	Nominated	
2014	Betty Award	Outstanding New Play	Legend Has It / Rebecca Northan, with Renee Amber, Bruce Horak, Mark Meer, Jamie Northan, and Sean Bowie	Nominated	
2019	Betty Award	Outstanding Performance by an Actor in a Drama	Assassinating Thomson / Lunchbox Theatre and Inside Out Theatre	Nominated	
2022	Betty Award	Outstanding Performance by an Actor in a Drama	Richard III / The Shakespeare Company and Hit and Myth	Won	
