= Husein Madhavji =

Canadian actor

Husein "Huse" Madhavji (pronounced Ma-dav-gee; born July 19) is a Canadian actor and television personality. He is best known for his role as Dr. Shahir Hamza on the medical drama Saving Hope and as the former face of Star! Canada’s Entertainment Channel.

== Early life ==
Madhavji grew up in London, Ontario in an Indian Gujarati family who were Ismailis. He graduated from the radio and television arts program at Ryerson University

== Career ==
Madhavji moved to Winnipeg, Manitoba to take on his first on-air position as an anchor/reporter for A-Channel. Later he moved to Northern California and was a live feature reporter for a short-lived show called Good Evening Sacramento before moving over to Good Day Sacramento for KMAX-TV. After a couple of years working in the United States, Madhavji returned to Canada to host Star!'s national show Star! Daily in Toronto along with Dina Pugliese, including Canada’s New Year’s Eve Bash. In 2007 CTV Globemedia acquired CHUM, and replaced Star! Daily with their own daily entertainment show etalk, where Madhavji became a reporter. He continued to front various specials on Star! and joined CP24, a round-the-clock local news channel in Toronto as their entertainment specialist until CTV decided to stop all production on Star! due to the economic downturn in Canada.

Madhavji continues to host various live events including AKF's "The World Partnership Walk" in Toronto and "Miss India Canada".

== Acting ==
Madhavji took an interest in theatre in high school, performing in various musicals and plays, but he was influenced towards broadcasting by his parents since they thought it was more stable than a career in theatre. However, he continued to pursue acting. He landed a few roles as a reporter in the feature films The Many Trials of Jane Doe and Gone, But Not Forgotten. While hosting at Star! in Toronto, Madhavji acted on stage in the South Asian comedy 30 Dates. After securing a film/TV agent, Madhavji was cast in the CBC pilot Throwing Stones. When Madhavji’s hosting career at Star! ended in 2008, he went on tour with the cast of 30 Dates, and appeared in the CTV/CBS cop drama The Bridge, then as a recurring character Ruptal 1 in the HBO Canada/Direct-TV comedy Call Me Fitz opposite Jason Priestley. Madhavji was seen in the crime thriller Cold Blooded, Combat Hospital and the second season of Call Me Fitz.

From 2012 to 2017 Madhavji appeared on the supernatural medical drama Saving Hope as Dr. Shahir Hamza.

== Filmography ==
Year	Title	Role	Notes
2002	The Many Trials of One Jane Doe	Media Reporter	TV movie
2005	Gone But Not Forgotten	Reporter (uncredited)	TV movie
2009	Throwing Stones	Yasminder ‘The Rock’ Ramham	TV movie
2009	The Border	Reporter	Episode: 3.9 “Dying Art”
2010	The Bridge	Aziz	Episode: 1.10 “The Blame Game”
2010-2013	Call Me Fitz	Ruptal 1	39 episodes; Main role (Seasons 1-4)
2011	The Listener	Landlord	Episode: 2.10 “Desperate Hours”
2011	Combat Hospital	Lt. Col. Max Pakash	8 episodes; Recurring (season 1)
2011	Neutered	Richard	Short
2012	Cold Blooded	Dr. Gill	Film
2012-2013	Off2Kali Comedy	Various Characters	4 episodes; Guest role (season 1)
2012-2017	Saving Hope	Dr. Shahir Hamza	71 episodes; Main role (Seasons 1-5)
2013	Splinter Cell: Blacklist	Jadid (voice)	Video game
2013	Cracked	Dave Harrison	Episode: 2.5 “The Hold Out”
2013	Just a Prayer	Aleem	Short
2015	The Time Traveler	Unknown	Short
2017	Breakdown	Jared	Short
2017	Lethal Weapon	Dr. Paulo Weller	Episode: 2.2 “Dancing in September”
2017	How to Buy a Baby	Dr. Evans	5 episodes; Recurring (season 1)
2017	Wisdom of the Crowd	Vikram Singh	Episode: 1.8 “Denial of Service”
2018	The Detail	Hickman Rashi	Episode: 1.1 “Pilot”
2018	Silencer	Arman Kasem	Short
2018	Have It All	Rick	Short
2019	Power of Termination	Dean	Short (Post-Production)
2020	Utopia Falls	Mentor Watts	series regular
2020	Schitt's Creek		guest role
2021	Donkeyhead	Rup	
2022	Star Trek: Strange New Worlds	Elder Gamal	Episode: 1.6 " Lift Us Where Suffering Cannot Reach"
2023	The Spencer Sisters	Alastair Dhumal	Supporting role
