= Melissa Navia =

American actress (born 1984)

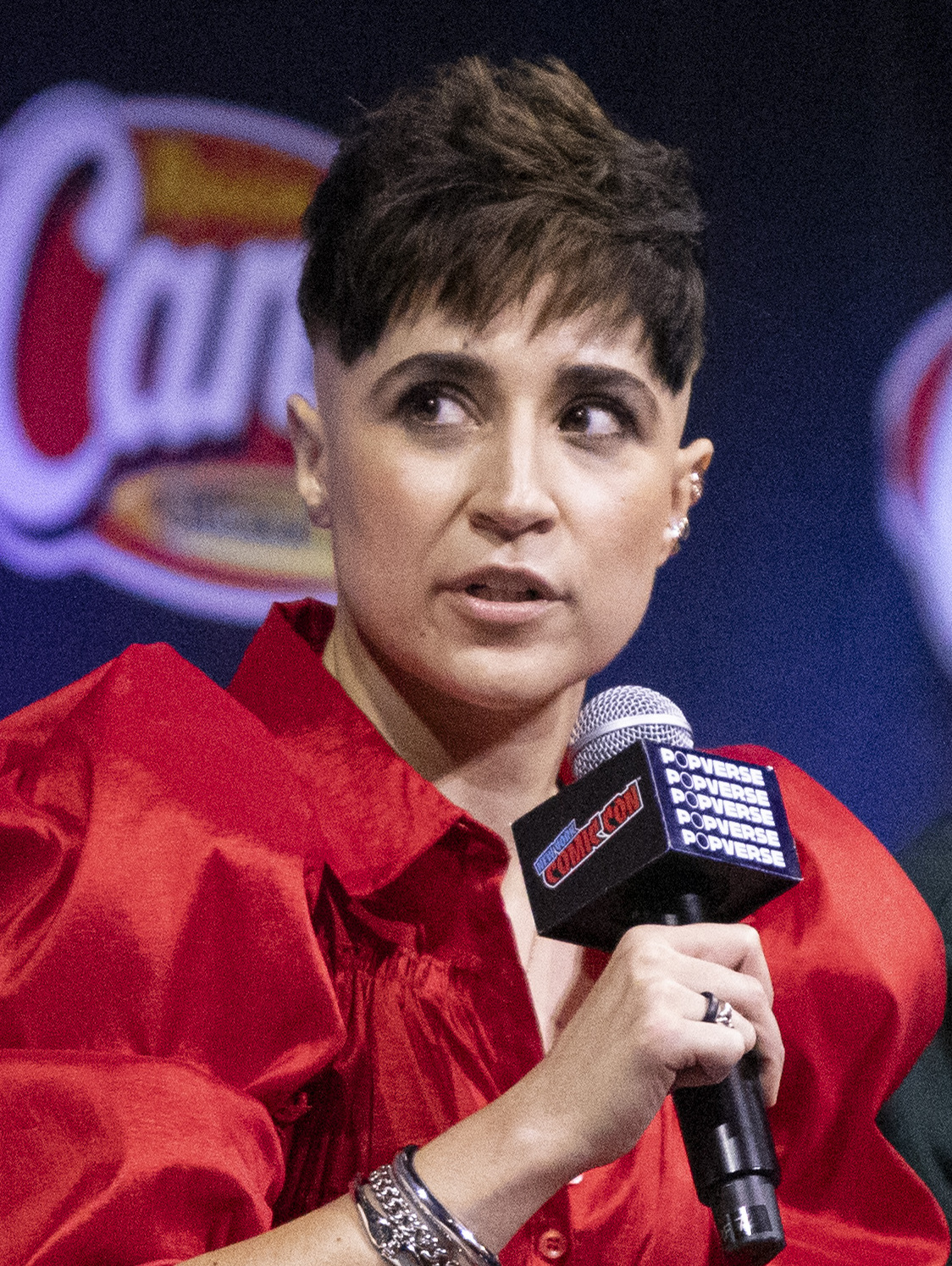
- Navia in 2025
- Born: August 24, 1984 (age 42)
- Occupation: Actress
- Known for: Star Trek: Strange New Worlds
- Partner: Brian Bannon (died 2021)

Melissa C. Navia (born August 24, 1984) is an American actress known for playing helmsman Erica Ortegas in Star Trek: Strange New Worlds (2022–present).

In 2013, Navia won the award for best actress at the Wild Rose Independent Film Festival for her role as Dawn in the sci-fi movie The Paragon Cortex. In 2015, she had a recurring role in the TV series Common Charges. In 2017, she had a guest role as Elena Gabriel, an astronaut bound for a life on Mars, in Showtime's series Billions. In 2018, she had a recurring role as Moana in AMC's series Dietland.

== Personal life ==
Her partner, Brian Bannon, died in 2021, three days after being diagnosed with leukemia.

== Awards and nominations ==
Year	Award	Category	Work	Result	Ref.
2013	Wild Rose Independent Film Festival	Best Actress	The Paragon Cortex	Won	

== Filmography ==
=== Film ===
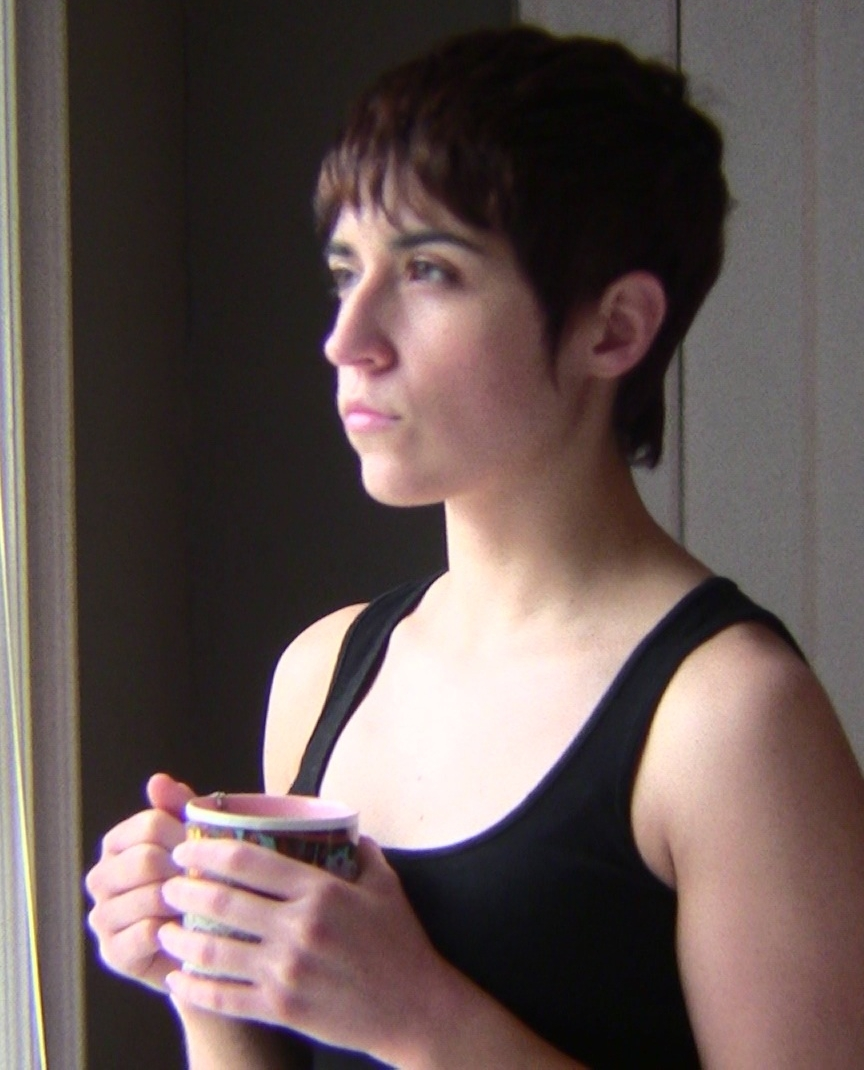
Navia in 2010

Year	Title	Role	Notes
2011	Love Eterne	Medina	
2011	Break Point	The Woman	Short film
2011	Metal Gear	Marabel Killian	Short film
2012	That's What She Said	East Village Lucky Joy Patron	
2012	Red Tulips: A Story About Forgetting	Cop Girl	Short film
2012	Girl Most Likely	Assistant	
2013	Highly Specialized, Highly Committed	Reyes	
2013	Sleeping with the Fishes	Casey	
2013	The Paragon Cortex	Dawn	
2013	Legacy	Grace	Short film
2014	Love Eterne [Mourning]	Medina	Short film
2014	Grind	Fighting Woman #1	Short film
2014	Growing Up and Other Lies	Raja	
2014	Amira & Sam	Police Clerk	
2014	What It Was	Hilary	
2014	Tremor Team 12	Agent Melanie Gregg	
2015	Temecula	Janet	Short film
2015	The Chosen	Sabrina	
2016	Interwoven	Voicemail Message #26	
2016	Working Poor	Melissa	Short film
2016	Hymns	Irene	
2017	New York Normal	Melanie	
2018	Love Me Anyway	Jack	
2018	Bel Canto	Esmeralda	
2019	Tower of Silence	Lior	
2019	Room 220	Officer Lex Diaz	Short film

=== Television ===
Year	Title	Role	Notes
2014	El Capo	Reporter	1 episode
2015	Common Charges	Wendy	7 episodes
2015	Mix-Matched	Maggie	1 episode
2015	The Affair	Waitress	1 episode
2017	Billions	Elena Gabriel	1 episode
2018	Homeland	EMT Julie	1 episode
2018	Dietland	Moana	2 episodes
2021	New Amsterdam	Co-Pilot Eva Schafer	1 episode
2021	Bull	Tidal	2 episodes
2022–present	Star Trek: Strange New Worlds	Lt. Erica Ortegas	Main cast
2022–2023	The Ready Room	Herself	2 episodes
