= Dan Jeannotte =

Canadian actor

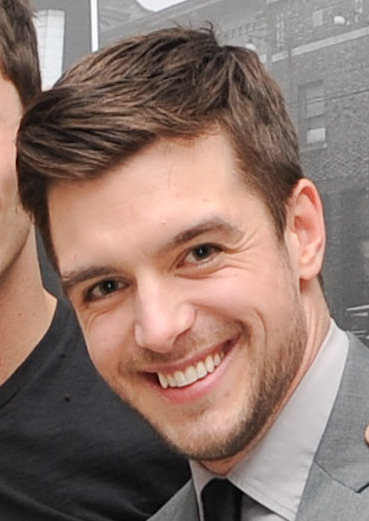
- Jeannotte in 2014
- Born: Daniel Jeannotte; 22 September 1981 (age 44); Montreal, Quebec, Canada
- Occupation: Actor
- Years active: 2000–present
- Spouse: Heidi Hawkins (m. 2012)
- Children: 1
- Website: danjeannotte.com (archived)

Daniel Jeannotte (born 22 September 1981) is a Canadian actor. He gained recognition for his roles as Brandon Russell in the American-Canadian fantasy television series Good Witch, and as James Stuart in the CW period drama series Reign. He also portrayed Arno Dorian through performance capture in Assassin's Creed Unity, an action-adventure video game developed by Ubisoft Montreal and published by Ubisoft. In April 2017, Jeannotte joined the Freeform drama series The Bold Type as Ryan Decker, a writer at Pinstripe magazine, who is Jane Sloan's (Katie Stevens) romantic interest. Since 2022, Jeannotte has also played the recurring role of Sam Kirk in Star Trek: Strange New Worlds.

== Personal life ==
Jeannotte is married to voice actor Heidi Hawkins. They first met while performing opposite one another in a production of the William Shakespeare play As You Like It. As of 2016, they live together in the East York community of Toronto.

== Filmography ==
=== Film ===
Year	Title	Role	Notes
2006	Flamousse	Adrian	Short film
2007	Speakeasy	Unknown	Short film
2008	Death Race	Hennessey tech	
2011	Washed in Blue	Jesse	Short film
2013	Red 2	Young FBI Agent	
2015	Cindy	Narrator (voice)	Short film
2015	Life on Jupiter	John (voice)	Short film
2019	Christmas in the Highlands	Alistair (main role)	

=== Television ===
Year	Title	Role	Notes
2008	Sophie	Troy	Episode: "Robbing the Grave"
2010	Second Chances	Young man	Television film
2010	The Cutting Edge: Fire and Ice	Angus Dwell	Television film
2010	The 11th Annual Canadian Comedy Awards	Himself	Television special
2011	Being Human	Tony	Episode: "Something to Watch Over Me"
2012	Deadly Hope	Det. John Bishop	Television film
2013	JFK: The Smoking Gun	Agent Wesley Frazier	Documentary television film
2015	Dark Matter	Derrick Moss	Episode: "Episode Eight"
2015	Beauty and the Beast	Scott Ellingsworth	Episode: "Sins of the Fathers"
2015	Newborn Moms	Leslie Cantor	Web series; episode: "Blocked"
2015	Fargo	Jack Hawk	Episode: "Loplop"
2015–2019	Good Witch	Brandon Russell	22 episodes
2016–2017	Reign	James Stuart	13 episodes
2017–2020	The Bold Type	Ryan Decker	Recurring role; 27 episodes
2018	Designated Survivor	Greg Bowen	3 episodes
2019	Paris, Wine & Romance	Jacques Fournier	Television film
2020	Christmas in the Highlands	Alistair McGregor	Television film
2021	Ghosts of Christmas Past	Charlie Brenson	Television film
2022	Home for a Royal Heart	Theo	Television film
2022	Lease on Love/From Chicago With Love	Milo Asher	Television film
2022	The Royal Nanny	Prince Colin	Television film
2022–present	Star Trek: Strange New Worlds	George Samuel Kirk	Recurring Role
2023	Sweeter Than Chocolate	Dean Chase	TV Movie (Hallmark)
2023	Our Christmas Mural	Will	Television film
2024	Sense and Sensibility	Edward Ferrars	Television film
2024	Falling in Love in Niagara	Mike	Television film
2024	Love on the Danube: Royal Getaway	Joe	Television film
2024	All I Need for Christmas	Archer Donovan	Television film
2025	North of North	Olivier	Episode: "Carnivores"
2025	A Change in Heart	Connor	Television Show
2026	A Royal Setting	Prince Luca	Hallmark Movie
2026	The Way Home	Cliff Kane	

=== Video games ===
Year	Title	Role	Notes
2007	Samurai Warriors 2: Xtreme Legends	Yoshimoto Imagawa/Toshiie Maeda	Voice (English version)
2012	Assassin's Creed III	Boston/New York merchant/Interrogation target	Voice
2013	Assassin's Creed IV: Black Flag	Spanish sailor/Soldier/Merchant	Voice
2013	Impire		Voice
2014	Assassin's Creed Unity	Arno Victor Dorian	Voice and motion capture performance
2015	Assassin's Creed Unity: Dead Kings	Arno Victor Dorian	Voice
2021	Assassin's Creed Valhalla: The Siege of Paris	Pierre	Voice
