= Star Trek Concordance =

1969 book by Bjo Trimble

- Cover of the 1976 Ballantine Books edition. The cover contains a moving wheel to facilitate episode lookup.
- Author: Bjo Trimble
- Illustrator: various
- Language: English
- Subject: Star Trek: TOS, Star Trek: TAS
- Genre: Reference
- Publisher: Mathom House (1st ed.); Ballantine Books (2nd ed.)
- Publication date: 1969 (1st ed.); 1976 (2nd ed.)
- Publication place: United States
- Media type: Print
- Pages: 256
- ISBN: 0-345-25137-7

The Star Trek Concordance is a reference book by Bjo Trimble about the television series Star Trek. The first edition was self-published in 1969. A mass-market edition was published in 1976. The 1976 edition contains summaries from every episode of The Original Series and The Animated Series, as well as an encyclopedia of characters and technology from the series. It was used as a reference (show bible) for later writers of the show.

== History ==
The Concordance originated as a privately printed fandom publication by Dorothy Jones Heydt in 1968. Originally, Heydt compiled notes on 3x5 notecards. Trimble suggested they write a book, and as the pair watched episodes on television, as well as on an early VCR, they made notes on which the book was based. In 1969, Trimble edited and self-published The Star Trek Concordance, covering the first two years of the series. In the Introduction to the Ballantine Concordance Trimble explains the origins of the book:

About midway through the first season of Star Trek, I noticed that Dorothy Jones [Heydt], a fellow fan, was making extensive notes on the show, with cross-references to items and things mentioned, lists of who played what part, and so on. It seemed too interesting merely to keep in a file box, so I suggested that we share it with other fans.

A supplement covering the third season was subsequently published in 1973.

In 1976, Ballantine published the first publicly distributed edition of the Concordance. At one time, the Ballantine edition was the best-selling trade edition book published in the United States. But due to Ballantine's concerns, at the time, of waning interest in Star Trek, it was decided to not reprint the book. An updated edition of the book would not be reprinted until 1995.

== Overview ==
Integrated into the front cover is a moving wheel which cross-references episodes by title, star date, "call letters" and page in the book. This facilitates finding episodes in the book.

Bjo Trimble dedicates the book to three men, one of them series creator Gene Roddenberry. She wrote, "Dedicated to... Gene Roddenberry for creating Star Trek in the first place." There is also an introduction by Trimble where she explains how the book was developed and acknowledges those who assisted her. The preface by Dorothy Jones Heydt, dated June 1968, follows. In it Heydt explains her contribution to the Concordance, as well as Roddenberry's concept of the stardate:

A function of space as well as time, being influenced by a starship's position in the galaxy, its course and velocity.

True to its origins in fandom, the Fan Art chapter contains several fan drawings depicting U.S.S. Enterprise personnel, aliens, other characters and Star Fleet insignias.

The Timeline chapter features an episode timeline in tabular format listing each episode by its stardate and page number. The first episode listed in the Timeline is "The Magicks of Megas-tu", stardate 1254.4, and the last episode is "Bem", stardate 7403.6.

The Summaries part of the book contains the following chapters: First Season, Second Season, Third Season, and Animateds. A detailed plot summary and list of characters are provided for each episode. The first summary is "The Man Trap", air date September 8, 1966. The last summary is "The Counter-Clock Incident", air date October 12, 1974. The animated chapter is illustrated, unlike the live action chapters.

The Lexicon chapter is an extensive and exhaustive alphabetical encyclopedia of characters, planets, ships, medicine, weaponry, etc., used in the series. It is also illustrated. Some entries in the Lexicon are provided for context. For example, there is an entry for author Lewis Carroll, even though he doesn't appear in the series. His entry appears thus:

Carroll, Lewis pseud. of Charles Lutwidge Dodson (1832–98): English writer best remembered for his famous children's books Alice's Adventures in Wonderland (1865) and its sequel, Through the Looking Glass both illustrated by Sir John Tenniel. The characters from the Alice books are frequent manifestations on the shore-leave planet, probably because of their popularity with members of the crew... (OUP/a, SL)

== Use as reference material ==
According to Richard Arnold, at the time he came to Paramount in the mid-70s, The Making of Star Trek and the Concordance were the only references in use. Trimble is acknowledged by the authors of The Star Trek Encyclopedia and Star Trek Spaceflight Chronology as a research consultant. Trimble said in 1999,

I didn't help write them, if that's what you mean. I certainly was available for phone calls on questions of what happened, or where something was (in the hands of what collector), and so on. I send (sic) many of my own notes to Mike (a long-time and very dear friend). He always acknowledged me, which was much appreciated, since many other writers who used my information never did. Especially the fiction writers, all of whom certainly used the Concordance.

The Concordance contained errors, according to Arnold. For example, Susan Howard from the "Day of the Dove" episode was accidentally omitted. This error would be reproduced later in The Star Trek Compendium and wouldn't be corrected until the second edition.

== See also ==
- Star Trek canon
- Treknobabble
