= The Broken Circle =

The Broken Circle may refer to:

- "The Broken Circle" (Runaways), an episode of the third season of Runaways
- "The Broken Circle" (Star Trek: Strange New Worlds), an episode of the second season of Star Trek: Strange New Worlds
