= Timeline of Star Trek =

This article discusses the fictional timeline of the Star Trek franchise. The franchise is primarily set in the future, ranging from the mid-22nd century (Star Trek: Enterprise) to the early 25th century (Star Trek: Picard), with the third season of Star Trek: Discovery jumping forward to the 32nd century; this is also the setting of Star Trek: Starfleet Academy. The franchise has also outlined a fictional future history of Earth prior to this, and, primarily through time travel plots, explored both past and further-future settings.

The chronology is complicated by the presence of divergent timelines within the franchise's narrative, as well as internal contradictions and retcons. The original series generally avoided assigning real-world dates to its futuristic setting, instead using the stardate system. Series from Star Trek: The Next Generation onwards defined their temporal settings in conventional form.

== Series, books, and film settings ==
This table shows each TV series and movie, its year of release or broadcast, the year it was set in according to the prevailing Okuda chronology (see below), and the stardate range for that year. The designation Enterprise-based series are the series that featured the various incarnations of the starship USS Enterprise. In universe timeline chronological order Star Trek: Enterprise (ENT), Star Trek: The Original Series (TOS), Star Trek: The Animated Series (TAS), Star Trek: The Next Generation (TNG), and all 13 of the Star Trek feature films, including the three newest J. J. Abrams "reboot" films, or "Kelvin Timeline" based on the original series.

Year	Stardates	Events		
1992-1996		Eugenics Wars		
2026–2053		World War III		
2054–2079		Post-atomic horror		
2063		First Contact (1996) [primary plotline]		
2150		Last holdouts join United Earth		
2151–2152		Enterprise season 1 (2001–2002)		
2152–2153		Enterprise season 2 (2002–2003)		
2153–2154		Enterprise season 3 (2003–2004)		
2154–2155		Enterprise season 4^{1} (2004–2005)		
2156–2160		Earth–Romulan War		
2161		Enterprise "These Are the Voyages..." (2005) holodeck simulation of the events^{2} Founding of the United Federation of Planets		
2245–2250		The Constitution-class USS Enterprise (NCC-1701) is launched under the command of Captain Robert April and begins its first 5-year mission.		
2254		Star Trek "The Cage" (1964)		
2256–2257	1207	Klingon-Federation War; Discovery season 1 (2017–2018)		
2258–2259		Discovery season 2 (2018–2019)		
2259		Strange New Worlds season 1 (2022) and season 2 (2023)		Khan [primary plotline]
2261		Strange New Worlds season 3 (2025)		
2262		Strange New Worlds season 4 (2026)		
2265	1000–1499	Star Trek "Where No Man Has Gone Before" (1965)		
2266–2267	1500–3299	Star Trek season 1 (1966–1967)		
2267–2268	3300–4799	Star Trek season 2 (1967–1968)		
2268–2269	4800–5999	Star Trek season 3 (1968–1969)		
2269–2270	5221–5683	The Animated Series season 1 (1973–1974)		
2270	6000–6146	The Animated Series season 2 (1974)		
2273	7410–7599	The Motion Picture (1979)		
2285	8100–8299	The Wrath of Khan (1982); The Search for Spock (1984)		
2286	8300–8399	The Voyage Home (1986)		
2287	8400–8499	The Final Frontier (1989)		
2293	9500–9999	The Undiscovered Country (1991); Generations (1994) [prologue]		
2324	1292.4	Section 31 (2025)		
2364	41000–41999	TNG season 1 (1987–1988)		
2365	42000–42999	TNG season 2 (1988–1989)		
2366	43000–43999	TNG season 3 (1989–1990)		
2367	44000–44999	TNG season 4 (1990–1991)		
2368	45000–45999	TNG season 5 (1991–1992)		
2369	46000–46999	TNG season 6 (1992–1993)	DS9 season 1 (1993)	
2370	47000–47999	TNG season 7 (1993–1994)	DS9 season 2 (1993–1994)	
2371	48000–48999	Generations (1994)	DS9 season 3 (1994–1995)	Voyager season 1 (1995)
2372	49000–49999		DS9 season 4 (1995–1996)	Voyager season 2 (1995–1996)
2373	50000–50999	First Contact (1996) Dominion War	DS9 season 5 (1996–1997)	Voyager season 3 (1996–1997)
2374	51000–51999	Dominion War	DS9 season 6 (1997–1998)	Voyager season 4 (1997–1998)
2375	52000–52999	Dominion War Insurrection (1998)	DS9 season 7 (1998–1999)	Voyager season 5 (1998–1999)
2376	53000–53999			Voyager season 6 (1999–2000)
2377–2378	54000–55599			Voyager season 7 (2000–2001)
2379	56400–56899	Nemesis (2002)		
2380–2382		Lower Decks		
2383–2385		Prodigy season 1 (2021), and season 2 (2024)		
2399	76000–76999	Picard season 1 (2020)		
2400	78183	Picard season 2 (2022)		
2401-2402		Picard season 3 (2023)		
3069–3089		The Burn, followed by the collapse of most of the United Federation of Planets		
3188-89		Discovery season 3 (2020)		
3190		Discovery season 4 (2021–22)		
3191		Discovery season 5 (2024)		
3195		Starfleet Academy season 1 (2026)		

=== Reboot timeline ===
Year	Events
2164	USS Franklin goes missing: Star Trek Beyond (2016)
2233	Star Trek (2009)^{3} [prologue]
2233–2258	Nero comics
2258–2259	Star Trek (2009)
2259–2260	Star Trek Into Darkness (2013)
2263	Star Trek Beyond (2016)

== Chronology and events ==
This timeline is based on the Star Trek Chronology model described below, supplemented by data from the website startrek.com. The Timeline also consists of before, between, and after those events.

Note: Many of these dates are rounded-off approximations, as the dialog from which they are derived often includes qualifiers such as "over," "more than," or "less than."

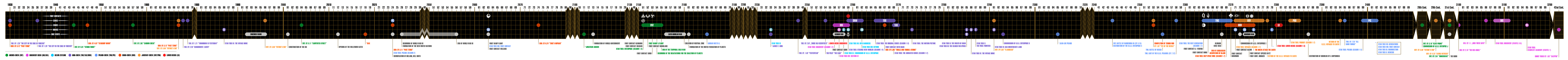
Overview about the most important events, first contacts and when series/movies of the Star Trek universe take place

=== Before Common Era ===
- The Big Bang
  - Quinn hides in the Big Bang to avoid discovery by Q.
- c. 6 billion years ago
  - The Guardian of Forever is formed.
- c. 4 billion years ago
  - A humanoid civilization seeds the oceans of many planets with genetic material, which would lead to the development of humanoids on many planets.
- c. 65 to 100 million years ago
  - The dinosaurs (the Voth civilization) from the episode "Distant Origin" are most likely descendants of Hadrosauridae who lived in the Cretaceous period of Earth's history.
- c. 1 million years ago
  - Sargon's people explore the galaxy and colonize various planets, possibly including Vulcan.
- c. 600,000 years ago
  - The Tkon Empire, an interstellar state consisting of dozens of star systems in the Alpha Quadrant, becomes extinct.
- c. 200,000 years ago
  - The Iconian civilization is destroyed.
- c. 8,000 BC
  - The Dominion may have been founded in the Gamma Quadrant by the shapeshifting race known as the Changelings around this time, possibly in a different form than is known in the modern timeline.
- c. 2700 BC
  - A group of extraterrestrial beings land on Earth and are eventually known as the Greek gods, as established in the episode "Who Mourns for Adonais?".

=== 1st millennium of the Common Era ===
- c. 4th century AD
  - The Vulcan Time of Awakening. In the midst of horrific wars on Vulcan, the philosopher Surak leads his people, teaching them to embrace logic and suppress all emotion. Those who refuse to follow Surak leave the Vulcan system and eventually colonize Romulus. ("Awakening" (ENT), "Balance of Terror" (TOS))
  - The Dominion may have been founded in the Gamma Quadrant by the shapeshifting race known as the Changelings (Founders) around this time.
- c. 9th century
  - Kahless the Unforgettable unites the Klingons by defeating the tyrant Molor in battle, and provides his people with teachings based on a philosophy of honor.

=== Pre-20th century ===
- c. 1505
  - The Borg are known to exist in the Delta Quadrant, 900 years prior to Voyager landing on the planet as referenced by the Vaadwaur "Dragon's Teeth" (VOY).
- c. 1570
  - The ancient Bajorans use solar sail ships to explore their star system, and one may have reached Cardassia.
- 18th century
  - The Suliban homeworld becomes uninhabitable ("Detained" (ENT)).
  - The Preservers transport various Native Americans to a faraway planet.
- c. 1864
  - The Skagarans abduct humans for use as slaves in their colony world (as referred to in Enterprise Season 3: "North Star").
- c. 1871
  - The Cardassian Union is established.
- 1888
  - August 31: Jack the Ripper's first victim is found murdered and mutilated in East London (as referred to in Star Trek: The Original Series Season 2: "Wolf in the Fold").
- c. 1893
  - "Time's Arrow" (TNG).

=== 20th century ===
- 1918
  - World War I ends with 15–22 million dead ("Bread and Circuses (TOS)").
- 1930
  - Social activist Edith Keeler dies in a traffic accident in New York. In an alternate timeline where she lives, she becomes the leader of a peace movement that indirectly leads to Nazi Germany winning World War II. ("The City on the Edge of Forever" (TOS)).
- 1937
  - Several hundred humans are secretly abducted by an alien race known as the Briori and brought to the Delta Quadrant. Eight are cryogenically frozen, including long-lost pilot Amelia Earhart ("The 37's" (VOY)).
- 1944 (alternate timeline)
  - In an alternate timeline caused by incursions from the Temporal Cold War of the 27th-31st centuries, Nazi Germany wins World War II with the help of an alien species called the Na'kuhl. The crew of the starship Enterprise (NX-01), arriving here from 2153, defeat the Na'kuhl, end the Temporal Cold War and return to their own time. ("Storm Front" (ENT))
- 1945
  - World War II ends with 70–85 million dead ("Bread and Circuses (TOS)").
  - The United Nations is established in San Francisco but its headquarters move to New York City.
- 1947
  - Three Ferengi (Quark, Rom, and Nog) crash land in the New Mexico desert, and are held by the U.S. government at a secret base for scientific study ("Little Green Men" (DS9)).
- 1957
  - A Vulcan scout ship visits Earth, according to a story told by T'Pol (presumably a true story as T'Pol examines a purse which was portrayed as used by her great-great-grandmother during the story; see episode entry) ("Carbon Creek" (ENT)).
- 1967
  - Captain Braxton's 29th century Federation timeship Aeon crashlands on Earth ("Future's End" (Voyager)).
- 1968
  - "Assignment: Earth" (TOS) past events.
- 1969
  - "Tomorrow Is Yesterday" (TOS) past events.
- 1986
  - Star Trek IV: The Voyage Home past events. Two humpback whales are brought forward in time to 2286 in order to repopulate their species after it became extinct.
- 1992
  - The Eugenics Wars (WWIII) begin. At the height of his influence, the genetically augmented tyrant Khan Noonien Singh is said to be the absolute ruler of more than one-quarter of Earth's population. (WWIII is retconned to be in the 2050s by TNG's Encounter at Farpoint and Star Trek First Contact and to being a conflict separate from the Eugenics Wars; SNW's "Strange New World" retcons it to taking place in the 21st century, prior to WWIII.)
- 1996
  - The Eugenics Wars end. After Khan's defeat, he and a group of about 80 or 90 Augments steal the sleeper ship SS Botany Bay and leave the Solar System. ("Space Seed" (TOS))
  - "Future's End" (VOY).
- 1999
  - Voyager 6 is launched.
- 2000
  - The past events of "11:59" (VOY).

=== 21st century ===
- 2002
  - The interstellar probe Nomad is launched.
- 2004
  - The past events of "Carpenter Street" (ENT).
- 2009
  - The first successful Earth-Saturn probe takes place.
- 2012
  - The world's first self-sustaining civic environment, Millennium Gate, which became the model for the first habitat on Mars, is completed in Portage Creek, Indiana ("11:59" (VOY)).
- 2018
  - Sleeper ships are made obsolete.
- 2022
  - The past events of "Tomorrow and Tomorrow and Tomorrow" (SNW).
- 2024
  - A united Ireland is achieved (TNG "The High Ground").
  - The past events of "Past Tense" (DS9), namely the "Bell Riots".
  - The past events of Star Trek: Picard Season 2.
- 2026
  - World War III begins on Earth. Colonel Phillip Green and a group of eco-terrorists commit genocide that claimed the lives of thirty-seven million people. (ENT "In A Mirror Darkly, Part Two") (In TOS, WWIII took place in the 1990s and is established as an alternate name for the Eugenics Wars while DS9's "Doctor Bashir, I Presume?" had the Eugenics Wars in the 22nd century. SNW's "Strange New World" retcons the Eugenics Wars to the 21st century, but prior to the outbreak of WWIII.)
- 2032
  - Ares IV, a crewed mission to Mars is launched.
  - Zefram Cochrane is born.
- 2037
  - The spaceship Charybdis makes an attempt to leave the solar system.
- 2047
  - The Hermosa quake strikes the region of southern California surrounding Los Angeles. The land sinks under two hundred meters of water. In the ensuing centuries, the region recovers, having transformed into one of the world's largest coral reefs. These reefs become home to thousands of different marine species.
- 2053
  - World War III ends and Earth is left devastated, mostly because of nuclear warfare. Most of the major cities are left in ruins with few remaining governments and the death toll reaching 600 million. Scientific advancement continues, however. (In TOS, WWIII took place in the 1990s and is established as an alternate name for the Eugenics Wars while DS9's "Doctor Bashir, I Presume?" had the Eugenics Wars in the 22nd century. SNW's "Strange New World" retcons the Eugenics Wars to the 21st century, but prior to the outbreak of WWIII.)
- 2062
  - Oldtown San Francisco is struck by an enormous earthquake, the Greater Quake, and it takes 20 years for the city to be restored.
- 2063
  - The past events of Star Trek: First Contact. Zefram Cochrane makes the first human warp flight with the Phoenix as civilization rebuilds following WWIII. This attracts the Vulcans and they make first contact with humans. (TOS "Metamorphosis" stated that Zefram Cochrane disappeared 150 years ago at the age of 87, which fits with the current timeline.)
  - In the Mirror Universe, Cochrane kills the Vulcan captain and his followers loot the Vulcan scout ship, leading to the founding of the Terran Empire. It is unclear whether this is the point of divergence between the Mirror Universe and the Prime Universe. ("In a Mirror, Darkly" (ENT))
- c. 2065
  - The SS Valiant is launched.
- 2067
  - The uncrewed interstellar warp probe Friendship 1 is launched.
- 2069
  - The colony ship SS Conestoga is launched. It would found the Terra Nova colony.
- 2079
  - Earth begins to recover from its nuclear war. The recovery is aided and partially organized by a newly established political entity called the European Hegemony.
- 2088
  - T'Pol is born.

=== 22nd century ===
- 2103
  - Earth colonizes Mars.
- 2112
  - Jonathan Archer is born in upstate New York on Earth.
- 2119
  - Zefram Cochrane, who now is residing on Alpha Centauri, sets off for parts unknown and disappears. Some had thought he was testing a new engine. After an exhaustive search, it is believed that Cochrane has died. He becomes one of the most famous missing people in history.
- 2129
  - Hoshi Sato is born.
- 2130
  - The United Nations establishes Starfleet Command with San Francisco as its headquarters.
- 2142
  - Warp 2 barrier broken by Commander Robinson in NX Alpha and Warp 2.5 achieved by Commander Archer in NX Beta.
- 2145
  - Warp 3 broken by Commander Duvall in NX Delta.
- 2149
  - Starship Enterprise (NX-01), the first Warp 5-capable ship built by humans, begins construction in upstate New York.
- 2150
  - Keel laid for Enterprise (NX-01).
- 2151–2155
  - The events of Star Trek: Enterprise take place.
- 2151
  - First contact between humans and Klingons. The NX-01 Enterprise, commanded by Captain Jonathan Archer, begins her exploratory mission. ("Broken Bow" (ENT))
- 2153
  - As a result of incursions from the Temporal Cold War of the 27th-31st centuries, a confederation of species called the Xindi test-fire a planet killer weapon against Earth, causing approximately 1 million casualties ("The Expanse" (ENT)). The NX-01 Enterprise defeats the Xindi but is thrown back in time to 1944. ("Zero Hour" (ENT))
- 2154
  - Captain Archer rediscovers Surak's lost writings, thwarting the Romulans' infiltration of Vulcan's government. ("Kir'Shara" (ENT))
  - The Klingon species becomes infected by a genetically engineered virus. The cure, using human antibodies, causes the Klingons to lose their cranial ridges and become slightly less aggressive. ("Divergence" (ENT))
- 2155
  - The USS Defiant, a Constitution-class vessel from the Prime Universe in 2268, travels back in time and also emerges in the Mirror Universe following its interaction with an anomaly. The abandoned Defiant is found by the Tholians. The Terran Empire learns of the ship's existence and subsequently captures it for their own use. ("In a Mirror, Darkly" (ENT))
- 2156–2160
  - The Earth–Romulan War is fought between United Earth and its allies, and the Romulan Star Empire. The war ends with the Battle of Cheron, a humiliating defeat to the Romulans, to such a degree that the Empire still considers the battle an embarrassment over 200 years later. The Romulan Neutral Zone is established. Because all communications with Romulans were conducted only by audio, no non-Vulcan species learn that Romulans are an offshoot of Vulcans. ("Balance of Terror" (TOS))
- 2161
  - The United Federation of Planets is founded by Earth, Tellar, Andoria, and Vulcan.
- 2165
  - Sarek, Federation diplomat and father of Spock, is born on Vulcan.
- 2184
  - Jonathan Archer is elected as the first United Federation of Planets President.
- 2192
  - Jonathan Archer steps down as UFP President after eight years.
- 2195
  - Robert April is born.
- 2160s to 2196
  - The Daedalus-class starship is active.

=== 23rd century ===
- 2222
  - Montgomery Scott is born in Scotland.
- 2226
  - Michael Burnham is born on Earth.
- 2227
  - Leonard McCoy is born in Georgia, North America on Earth.
- 2230
  - Spock, the son of Sarek and the human Amanda Grayson, is born on Vulcan.
- 2232
  - The events of Star Trek: Short Treks episode "The Girl Who Made the Stars" take place.
- 2233
  - James T. Kirk is born in Riverside, Iowa on Earth.
- 2233 (alternate timeline): Prologue scene of Star Trek.
  - Ambassador Spock and the Romulan mining ship Narada, commanded by Nero, emerge from a black hole created by Spock's detonation of red matter in 2387 and arrive in the past. Nero's arrival and subsequent attack on the USS Kelvin create the Kelvin Timeline.
  - James T. Kirk is born aboard a shuttlecraft from the USS Kelvin.
  - James T. Kirk's father, George Kirk, is killed.
- 2238
  - The events of Star Trek: Short Treks episode "The Brightest Star" take place.
- 2241 (alternate timeline)
  - Pavel Chekov born in Russia on Earth.
- 2245–2250
  - The USS Enterprise, a Constitution class vessel, is launched under the command of Robert April, on a five-year mission of exploration. In the alternate time line created by Nero's attack on the USS Kelvin, the Enterprise is still under construction in 2255 and is not launched on its maiden voyage until 2258.
- 2245
  - Pavel Chekov is born to Russian parents. In the alternate timeline created by Nero's attack on the USS Kelvin, Chekov is only eight years younger than James T. Kirk, implying a birthdate of 2241.
- 2250
  - After a refit, the USS Enterprise (NCC-1701) is launched on a second five-year mission. Command of the ship is assigned to Captain Christopher Pike.
- 2254
  - The events of Star Trek: Short Treks episode "Q&A" take place.
  - The events of "The Cage".
- 2256-2257
  - The events of Star Trek: Discovery season 1 take place. The Klingon-Federation War.
- 2257
  - The events of Star Trek: Section 31 take place.
- 2257-2258
  - The events of Star Trek: Discovery season 2 take place. The USS Discovery and USS Enterprise (NCC-1701) engage in a pitched battle to neutralise the rogue AI Control. The battle is a success, but the Enterprise falsely reports that the Discovery was lost with all hands, to conceal the fact that it traveled 930 years into the future in order to prevent Control from reasserting itself. The Enterprise subsequently undergoes repairs and departs for Edrin II 4 months later.
- 2258 (alternate timeline)
  - The events of Star Trek take place. Nero destroys the planet Vulcan – killing billions, including Spock's mother – as well as nine Federation starships. The USS Enterprise (NCC-1701) is built in the state of Iowa and is launched on its maiden voyage under Captain Christopher Pike. James T. Kirk becomes the ship's new captain shortly afterward.
  - The events of Star Trek: Bridge Crew take place. The USS Aegis is searching for a new homeworld for the Vulcans after the destruction of their planet. The ship heads for a region of space called 'The Trench', which is being occupied by Klingons.
  - The events of Star Trek (2013 video game) take place. Captain Kirk, Spock, and the crew of the USS Enterprise encounter a powerful alien race known as the Gorn.
- 2259 (alternate timeline)
  - Some time prior to this point in the Kelvin timeline, the Federation black ops unit Section 31 revives Khan Noonien Singh from suspended animation on the Botany Bay, forcing him to undergo plastic surgery and work as a Section 31 agent under the identity of "John Harrison".
  - The events of Star Trek Into Darkness take place. Khan is returned to suspended animation on Earth as punishment for acts of terrorism.
- 2259
  - The events of Star Trek: Strange New Worlds season 1 take place.
  - The Enterprise begins another five-year mission under Christopher Pike.
- 2260 (alternate timeline)
  - The Enterprise is launched on a historic five-year mission.
- 2263 (alternate timeline)
  - Space Station Yorktown is established by Commodore Paris.
  - The events of Star Trek Beyond take place. The USS Enterprise is destroyed; USS Enterprise-A is commissioned at Starbase Yorktown as its replacement.
  - Ambassador Spock from the Prime Universe dies in the Kelvin Universe.
- 2261–2264
  - The USS Enterprise (NCC-1701) undergoes a major refit, increasing its crew complement from 203 to 430.
- 2263
  - Boothby, groundskeeper and counselor at Starfleet Academy, is born.
- 2265–2270
  - Following the promotion of Christopher Pike, Captain James T. Kirk is assigned command of the Enterprise on a historic five-year mission. (In the originally canonical Star Trek Spaceflight Chronology this was 2207 to 2212; Star Trek: Strange New Worlds contradicts this somewhat by dating Pike's accident to approximately 2268 or 2269 (per dialogue in the episode "Strange New World" stating the accident occurs 10 years in the future), but the TOS episode "The Menagerie" takes place during the first season, approximately a year into Kirk's mission rather than close to its end.)
- 2265
  - The events of "Where No Man Has Gone Before" (TOS)
- 2266–2269
  - The events of Star Trek: The Original Series take place.
- 2266
  - When the USS Enterprise (NCC-1701) engages a Romulan Bird-of-Prey in combat, the secret that Romulans are the same species as Vulcans is finally revealed. ("Balance of Terror" (TOS))
  - The Enterprise crew revive Khan Noonien Singh and 72 surviving Augments from suspended animation on the Botany Bay. After stopping the Augments from taking control of the Enterprise, Captain Kirk exiles them to the planet Ceti Alpha V. ("Space Seed" (TOS).) Unbeknownst to Kirk, the explosion of a neighboring planet destroys most of Ceti Alpha V's ecosystem six months later. (Star Trek II: The Wrath of Khan)
- 2267
  - Kirk discovers that Zefram Cochrane was abducted to a distant planetoid by an energy being that granted him immortality. ("Metamorphosis" (TOS))
- 2268
  - USS Defiant disappears from the Prime Universe, reemerging in the Mirror Universe of 2155. ("The Tholian Web" (TOS))
- 2269-2270
  - The events of Star Trek: The Animated Series take place. (There is no on-screen confirmation of this, but anecdotally TAS is believed to take place towards the end of the mission.)
  - During some period between 2269 and 2273, the Klingons regain their cranial ridges.
- 2270
  - USS Enterprise returns from its five-year mission under the command of Captain James T. Kirk and enters major refit while Kirk is promoted to Admiral at Starfleet Command. Captain Will Decker is assigned command of the vessel.
- 2273
  - The events of Star Trek: The Motion Picture.
    - Voyager 6 returns to Earth, having been massively enhanced by alien technology to become an entity calling itself "V'ger".
    - Kirk takes over command of the Enterprise from Decker, who subsequently merges with V'ger and ascends to a higher plane of existence.
- 2273-2278
  - The upgraded USS Enterprise (NCC-1701) embarks on a five-year mission under the command of Admiral James T. Kirk.
- 2278
  - The USS Bozeman, under the command of Captain Morgan Bateson, enters a temporal causality loop in which it will remain for 90 years until it encounters the USS Enterprise (NCC-1701-D) stuck in the same loop. ("Cause and Effect" (TNG))
- 2279
  - Around this time the USS Enterprise (NCC-1701) is retired from active duty and assigned as a training vessel in orbit of Earth. At some point during this period, Spock is promoted to captain and assigned command of the vessel.
- 2284
  - The USS Excelsior (NX-2000), the first ship equipped with transwarp drive, is built in San Francisco Fleet Yards and was later docked at Earth Spacedock. Unfortunately, the ship was still unfinished due to many specifications and was completed in upstate New York before its commissioning as USS Excelsior (NCC-2000).
- 2285
  - The events of Star Trek II: The Wrath of Khan.
    - Khan Noonien Singh and his remaining Augments escape from Ceti Alpha V and steal USS Reliant and the Genesis Device. All of them are killed in combat against the Enterprise.
    - Kirk takes over command of the Enterprise from Captain Spock, who subsequently dies.
  - The events of Star Trek III: The Search for Spock. The original USS Enterprise (NCC-1701), having been decommissioned by Starfleet, is destroyed to prevent it from falling into Klingon hands. Spock is revived.
- 2286
  - The events of Star Trek IV: The Voyage Home.
  - The USS Enterprise (NCC-1701-A) is launched on its maiden voyage under the command of the newly demoted Capt. James Kirk.
- 2287
  - The events of Star Trek V: The Final Frontier.
- 2293
  - The events of Star Trek VI: The Undiscovered Country. The USS Enterprise (NCC-1701-A) is decommissioned shortly afterwards.
  - The opening events of Star Trek Generations. The USS Enterprise (NCC-1701-B) is launched under the command of John Harriman. While responding to a distress call, the Enterprise is struck by a discharge from the Nexus which breaches the hull and James T. Kirk is presumed killed in the blast. (The exact timing is uncertain and the events of Generations could take place in a later year.)

=== 24th century ===
- 2305
  - Jean-Luc Picard is born in La Barre, France on Earth.
- 2311
  - The Tomed Incident.
- 2319
  - Gary Seven is born.
- 2320
  - Bolians join the Federation.
- 2324
  - Beverly Howard (Crusher) is born in Copernicus City, Luna.
- 2327
  - Jean-Luc Picard graduates from Starfleet Academy on Earth (2323-2327).
- 2329
  - Chakotay is born on a Federation colony near Cardassian space in the demilitarized zone
- 2332
  - Benjamin L. Sisko is born in New Orleans, Louisiana on Earth.
- 2333
  - Jean-Luc Picard becomes captain of the USS Stargazer.
- 2335
  - Geordi La Forge is born in Mogadishu, Somalia on Earth.
  - William T. Riker is born in Valdez, Alaska on Earth.
- 2336
  - Deanna Troi is born on Betazed.
  - Kathryn Janeway is born in Bloomington, Indiana on Earth.
- 2337
  - Tasha Yar is born in a failed Federation colony on Turkana IV.
- 2340
  - Worf, son of Mogh, is born on the Klingon homeworld, Qo'noS.
- 2341
  - Julian Bashir is born.
- 2343
  - The Galaxy class development project is officially given the greenlight by Starfleet Command.
- 2344
  - The USS Enterprise (NCC-1701-C), under the command of Captain Rachel Garrett, is destroyed defending a Klingon settlement on Narendra III under attack from Romulans.
  - Due to the Enterprise-C's sacrifice, a new era of more open communication begins between the Federation and the Klingon Empire, leading to a formalized alliance.
  - In the alternate timeline where Enterprise-C is not destroyed, the Klingons fight a long, destructive war against the Federation.
- 2345
  - Sela (half-Romulan/half-Human), daughter of Natasha Yar (alternate reality from "Yesterday's Enterprise"), is born.
- 2346
  - Worf's parents are killed by Romulans in the Khitomer massacre. Worf (age 6) is adopted by human parents.
- 2349
  - Annika Hansen is born in Tendara Colony to Magnus and Erin Hansen.
- 2355
  - Magnus, Erin, and Annika Hansen are assimilated by the Borg while on a research mission in the Delta quadrant.
  - The USS Stargazer is attacked by an unknown vessel (later discovered to be Ferengi in origin) in the Maxia Zeta system. Jean-Luc Picard wins the confrontation by devising a tactic which becomes known as the Picard Manoeuvre. However, due to damage suffered during the battle, the crew are forced to abandon ship. The Stargazer is later recovered in 2364.
- 2357
  - Worf is the first Klingon to enter Starfleet Academy.
  - USS Galaxy (NX-70637), the prototype Galaxy class is launched.
- 2363
  - USS Enterprise (NCC-1701-D), the third Galaxy-class starship (following the Galaxy and Yamato) is launched from the Utopia Planitia shipyards in Mars orbit (under the command of Jean-Luc Picard), and becomes the Federation's new flagship.
- 2364–2370
  - The events of Star Trek: The Next Generation.
- 2364
  - First contact with the Q Continuum. ("Encounter at Farpoint" (TNG))
- 2365
  - Q forces the Enterprise-D to make first contact with the Borg. ("Q Who" (TNG))
- 2367
  - The Borg assimilate Captain Jean-Luc Picard and fight the Battle of Wolf 359 against a Starfleet task force 7.7 light years from Earth. The battle results in the loss of 39 Starfleet vessels and over 11,000 lives ("The Best of Both Worlds" (TNG)). Benjamin Sisko aboard the USS Saratoga is a participant in the battle and is one of the few survivors alongside his son Jake Sisko ("Emissary" (DS9)). With the task force lost, the Borg continue to Earth. Picard is rescued and the Borg cube is destroyed via the actions of the crew of the Enterprise-D.
- 2368
  - Ambassador Spock lives undercover on Romulus, supporting an underground movement to reunify Romulans with Vulcans. ("Unification" (TNG))
- 2369–2375
  - The events of Star Trek: Deep Space Nine.
- 2369
  - Terok Nor, a Cardassian space station orbiting Bajor, is taken over by Starfleet following the end of hostilities between Bajor and Cardassia. It is redesignated Deep Space Nine and placed under the command of Commander (later Captain) Benjamin Sisko. Soon after, the discovery of a stable wormhole between the Alpha and Gamma quadrants leads to DS9 being relocated near the wormhole's location in order to facilitate trade, exploration and defense.
- 2370
  - The events of Star Trek: Enterprise episode "These Are the Voyages..." take place. (this is due to the story being depicted as a holodeck recreation concurrent with the events of the TNG episode The Pegasus).
  - The USS Defiant (NX-74205), a mothballed prototype originally designed to fight the Borg, is commissioned into active service and is assigned to Benjamin Sisko to help protect DS9. Due to the Defiant being over-powered and over-gunned for its size, several flaws in the ship's design require attention before it reaches a fully operational status. The Defiant is officially classed as an escort vessel; however, unofficially it is considered a warship built purely for combat.
- 2371
  - The "present-day" events of Star Trek Generations. The USS Enterprise (NCC-1701-D)'s stardrive section is destroyed by a warp core breach; the saucer section containing the crew makes a forced landing on Veridian III. The ship is subsequently declared a total loss. James T. Kirk reappears from the temporal continuum in which he had been since his disappearance in 2293. Kirk is killed on Veridian III.
- 2371–2378
  - The events of Star Trek: Voyager.
  - "Caretaker": the USS Voyager, under the command of Capt. Kathryn Janeway is stranded deep in the Delta Quadrant and faces a 75-year-long voyage back to Federation space. Janeway merges her crew with survivors of a vessel staffed by members of an organization called the Maquis that at this time are de facto enemies of the Federation.
- 2372
  - Sovereign-class USS Enterprise (NCC-1701-E) is launched under the command of Captain Jean-Luc Picard (with most of his command crew from the 1701-D intact).
- 2373
  - The events of Star Trek: First Contact. The Battle of Sector 001 occurs with a Starfleet task force engaging in a running battle with a Borg cube en route to Earth. The USS Defiant (NX-74205) from DS9 is severely damaged but not destroyed, with the crew evacuating to the Enterprise. The USS Enterprise (NCC-1701-E) follows a Borg sphere through a temporal rift and events shift at that point to 2063.
  - Still unaware that the USS Voyager is stuck in the Delta Quadrant, Starfleet officially declares the ship lost with all hands.
- 2373–2375
  - Tensions between the Alpha and Gamma quadrants erupt into open warfare, igniting the Dominion War fully, with DS9 at its epicenter.
- 2374
  - Annika Hansen (who now identifies herself by the Borg designation Seven of Nine) is liberated from the Borg collective by the USS Voyager crew. ("Scorpion, Part II" (VOY))
  - Using an abandoned sensor array network, the USS Voyager detects a Federation vessel, the USS Prometheus, on the edge of the Alpha Quadrant and transmits The Doctor to the ship. After freeing the ship from the Romulans with help from the Prometheus EMH, Voyager officially re-establishes contact with Starfleet.
- 2375
  - The USS Defiant (NX-74205) is destroyed. Several weeks later, DS9 receives a replacement Defiant Class vessel, the USS São Paulo. Captain Sisko is granted special permission by Starfleet to rename the vessel Defiant.
  - After devastating losses on both sides, the Federation, alongside the Romulan and Klingon Empire, make a final push against the Dominion, resulting in the Battle of Cardassia. The Dominion subsequently surrenders to the Federation.
  - The events of Star Trek: Insurrection. Dialogue in this film and in the DS9 finale "What You Leave Behind" place the chronology of this film as during that episode, after the final battle of the war but before the treaty signing ceremony. Most notable in the film is Worf's ability to leave the station to join the Enterprise, as well as a line about Federation diplomats being involved in Dominion negotiations, and the Federation's willingness to work with the Son'a, who are established as a Dominion ally during the war.
- 2378
  - With the help of Admiral Janeway from an alternate timeline in which the ship's return is delayed many years with tragic results, the USS Voyager returns to the Alpha Quadrant. ("Endgame"). Tom Paris' and B'Elanna Torres's daughter is born. At some point after returning home (and prior to the events of Star Trek: Nemesis), Janeway is promoted to Vice Admiral in the main timeline.
- 2379
  - The events of Star Trek: Nemesis, resulting in the death of Lieutenant Commander Data.
  - Discovery of previously unknown android named "B-4", a prototype android similar in design to Lt. Commander Data but with a notably less advanced positronic network.
- 2380–2382
  - The events of Star Trek: Lower Decks.
- 2383–2385
  - The events of Star Trek: Prodigy.
- 2385, First Contact Day
  - The events of Star Trek: Short Treks episode "Children of Mars" take place. The Utopia Planitia Fleetyards on Mars are sabotaged and subsequently destroyed by rogue synthetics in a surprise attack. The battle results in the loss of 92,143 lives, the planet itself being considered destroyed, its stratosphere ignited, and the destruction of the rescue armada to evacuate Romulus. In the aftermath of the attack, the Federation, unable to determine how or why the synths went rogue, bans the creation of synthetic liveforms
- 2386
  - Lieutenant Icheb is captured and stripped for his Borg parts by Bjayzl, and subsequently euthanized by Seven of Nine.
- 2387
  - A star in the Romulan Empire goes supernova. Ambassador Spock attempts to counter the resulting shockwave using Red Matter, but is unable to save the planet Romulus from destruction. Spock and the Romulan mining ship Narada, commanded by Nero, are dragged into a black hole created by the Red Matter detonation and arrive in the past. Nero's arrival in 2233 and subsequent attack on the USS Kelvin creates the Kelvin Timeline. (Star Trek (2009))
- 2394 (alternate timeline)
  - Voyager returns to the Alpha Quadrant in the beginning of Star Trek: Voyager series finale ("Endgame"). This sets in motion events in which Kathryn Janeway becomes dissatisfied and begins laying plans to eventually change the timeline and send Voyager home sooner.
- 2395 (alternate timeline)
  - The "future" in the Star Trek: The Next Generation series finale "All Good Things...".
- 2399
  - The events of Star Trek: Picard season 1.

=== 25th century ===
- 2400-2402
  - The events of Star Trek: Picard seasons 2-3.
- 2402
  - USS Titan (NCC-80102-A) is renamed USS Enterprise (NCC-1701-G) under the command of Captain Seven of Nine.
- 2404 (alternate timeline)
  - The original timeline split in the Star Trek: Voyager series finale ("Endgame"), where Admiral Janeway goes back 26 years to the Delta Quadrant and secures Voyager's earlier return to the Alpha Quadrant. This begins a new timeline (as yet unnamed).

=== 26th century ===
- c. 2540–2550 (alternate timeline)
  - The Starship Enterprise-J (presumably NCC 1701-J) is commissioned and takes part in the Battle of Procyon V against the Sphere Builders as shown in Enterprise episode "Azati Prime". As the events of the episode “Zero Hour” result in the destruction of the spheres and the dissipation of the altered space, it is likely this battle occurs only in an alternate timeline.

=== 27th century ===
- Temporal Cold War (with agents from the 31st century); first established in the pilot episode of Star Trek: Enterprise and recurring until the series' fourth season premiere, it is a struggle between those who would alter history to suit their own ends and those who would preserve the integrity of the original timeline.
- With the distance between them having expanded over the centuries and making travel increasingly difficult, the last crossing between the Prime and Mirror Universes occurs at some point during this century.

=== 29th century ===
- The Aeon-type timeship is in active service during this century ("Future's End"), as is the Wells-class timeship Relativity ("Relativity").

=== 30th century ===
- Around the year 2958, supplies of Dilithium in the Milky Way started to dry up, marking the beginning of an energy crisis. The United Federation of Planets began development and trials of alternatives to warp drive, though none proved to be reliable.
- The Federation spends much of this century engaged in a temporal war with the objective of upholding the Temporal Accords to ensure the timeline remains unaltered.

=== 31st century ===
- 3069
  - A cataclysmic galaxy-wide event referred to as "The Burn" occurs. Nearly all Dilithium in the galaxy suddenly goes inert, causing a massive loss of life and the destruction of every ship and facility with an active warp core. In the aftermath, the remaining Dilithium became an ever more scarce resource. With few ships and warp travel severely impeded, no explanation for what happened and the uncertainty if it will happen again, the United Federation of Planets, Starfleet Command, and the United Earth, effectively collapse.
- 3074
  - The main plot of the Star Trek: Voyager episode "Living Witness" takes place, and the final scene takes place "many years" after that.
- 3089
  - The Federation, Starfleet Command and United Earth leave planet Earth for a new headquarters location. Around the same time, the United Earth government withdraws Earth from the Federation, becoming fully self-sufficient and isolating multiple planets from the rest of the galaxy.
- Episodes with time traveler Daniels from Enterprise: "Cold Front", "Shockwave", "Azati Prime"

=== 32nd and 33rd centuries ===
- 3186
  - This is the year Gabrielle Burnham arrived in after using the Red Angel suit to escape a Klingon attack on her home. (Discovery S2 E10)
- 3188-3191, ca. 3225
  - The events of Star Trek: Discovery seasons 3 to 5.
- 3195
  - The events of Star Trek: Starfleet Academy season 1.

=== 34th century ===
- 3374 (alternate timeline)
  - According to Obrist, if the Krenim weapon ship continued to alter time to this point, full restoration of the Krenim Imperium would not have been achieved.

=== Far future ===
- The events of the Star Trek: Short Treks episode "Calypso" take place in the 43rd century or later.
- 60-70 trillion years
  - The Universe will collapse.

== History of the chronology (historiography) ==
Several efforts have been made to develop a chronology for the events depicted by the Star Trek television series and its spin-offs. This matter has been complicated by the continued additions to the Star Trek canon, the existence of time travel and multiple concurrent timelines, and the scarcity of Gregorian calendar dates given in the show (stardates instead being used).

=== Original series ===
Not many references set the original series in an exact time frame, and those that exist are largely contradictory. In the episode "Tomorrow Is Yesterday", a 1960s military officer says that he's going to lock Captain Kirk up "for two hundred years", to which Kirk replies, with wry amusement: "That ought to be just about right." Likewise, in the episode "Space Seed", it is said that the 1996 warlord Khan Noonien Singh is from "two centuries" ago. Both these references place the show in the 22nd century. However, in the episode "Miri", it is said that 1960 was around 300 years ago, pushing the show into the 23rd century. Finally, the episode "The Squire of Gothos" implied that the light cone of 19th century Earth has expanded to 900 light years of radius, which seems to set the show in the 28th century, since light would take nine centuries to traverse that distance.

According to notes in The Making of Star Trek, the show is set in the 23rd century, and the Enterprise was supposed to be around 40 years old. Roddenberry says in this book that the stardate system was invented to avoid pinning down the show precisely in time frame. Roddenberry's original pitch for the series dated it "'somewhere in the future. It could be 1995, or maybe even 2995".

=== Early chronologies ===
The Star Trek Spaceflight Chronology and Mr. Scott's Guide to the Enterprise provide a timeline that gives the following dates:

- The sub-warp ship the UNSS Icarus makes first contact with Alpha Centauri in 2048, and there meets Zefrem Cochran [sic], who has invented warp drive.
- The first Earth warp ship, the Bonaventure makes its first voyage, to Tau Ceti, in 2059.
- The first contact with Vulcans is in 2065, when a damaged Vulcan spaceship is rescued by UNSS Amity.
- The Federation is formed in 2087.
- A Federation–Romulan War occurs in the 2100s.
- First contact with the Klingon Empire in 2151, who demand the return of a group of refugees from the USS Sentry.
- The first Constitution-class starship is launched in 2188.
- The USS Enterprise's five-year mission under Captain Kirk lasts from 2207 to 2212.
- The events of Star Trek: The Motion Picture occur in 2217.
- The events of Star Trek IV: The Voyage Home occur on September 21, 2222.

The Star Fleet Battles game was published in 1979, with a license only covering the original series. It has since diverged into an entirely separate fictional universe, new additions to which continue to be published. It does not tie into the Gregorian calendar, instead using a "Year 1" of the invention of Warp on Earth. Its version of the original series backstory is:

- Y1 – Warp drive is developed on Earth.
- Y4 – Federation is formed by Earth, Vulcan, Andoria, Alpha Centauri.
- Y40-Y46 – Earth–Romulan War.
- Y71 – Starfleet is formed.
- Y126 – The Constitution-class is launched (an upgrade from the Republic-class).
- Y154–159 – The events of the Original Series.

See Star Fleet Universe timeline.

=== TNG era and the Okudas ===
It was initially stated that The Next Generation was set in the 24th century, around 78 years after the existing Star Trek. The pilot had dialogue stating Data was part of the Starfleet "class of '78". The pilot episode, "Encounter at Farpoint", also has a cameo appearance by Leonard "Bones" McCoy, who is said to be 137. In the last episode of the first season, the year is firmly established by Data as 2364.

A Star Trek Chronology was published in 1993, written by production staff members Denise Okuda and Michael Okuda. A second edition was issued in 1996. The dates in the Chronology are consistent with the earlier Star Trek: The Next Generation Technical Manual.

It gives the following dates:

- Zephram Cochrane invents warp drive around 2061 (so that the SS Valiant can be constructed and go missing two hundred years before "Where No Man Has Gone Before", dated to 2265; the first edition gives 2061; the second edition moves this to 2063 per Star Trek: First Contact).
- The Romulan War takes place in the 2150s (about a hundred years before "Balance of Terror").
- The Federation is formed in 2161, after the Romulan War, on the basis that "Balance of Terror" says that it was an Earth-Romulan war, not a Federation-Romulan War.
- The Enterprise in launched in 2245.
- Kirk's five-year mission lasts from 2264 to 2269.
  - The non-pilot aired live-action Star Trek episodes are dated from 2266 to 2269, three hundred years after their initial airing. This is in keeping also with Gene Roddenberry's concept (discussed in The Making of Star Trek by Roddenberry and Stephen Whitfield) that Star Trek's first season takes place after the mission has been under way for some time.
  - The chronology does not include the events of Star Trek: The Animated Series.
  - An episode of Voyager, "Q2", aired after the Chronology was published, established that Kirk's five-year mission actually ended in 2270.
- The events of Star Trek: The Motion Picture take place in 2271 (Kirk has been Chief of Starfleet Operations for 2 1/2 years, according to dialog from Kirk and Decker).
- Numerous sources, including the Chronology, postulate a second five-year mission under now-Admiral Kirk's command, begun soon after the events of the first movie; in part this is to take into account the unproduced revival series Star Trek: Phase II.
- The events of Star Trek II: The Wrath of Khan and Star Trek III: The Search for Spock take place in 2285.
- The events of Star Trek IV: The Voyage Home take place in 2286.
- The events of Star Trek V: The Final Frontier take place in 2287.
- The events of Star Trek VI: The Undiscovered Country take place in 2293, based on McCoy's statement that he had served on the Enterprise for 27 years, and his absence in "Where No Man Has Gone Before".
- The Kirk-era part of Star Trek Generations is set 78 years before 2371 (established by way of an on-screen caption), thus is set in 2293 and soon after Star Trek VI.

The gap between the 1986 film Star Trek IV: the Voyage Home (2286) and the 1987 first season of The Next Generation (2364) is 78 years by this timeline, matching early press materials.

A gap of 10 years passed between the broadcast of the last episode of Star Trek: The Original Series and the release of The Motion Picture. The film skirted around the fact the actors had aged, supposing that only 2 1/2 years had passed since the events of the TV show. For Star Trek II, it was decided to acknowledge the reality of the aging actors, both by setting the film some 15 years after "Space Seed", and by having Kirk worry about getting old.

Within The Next Generation era, episodes and films are easier to date. Stardates correspond exactly with seasons, with the first two digits of the stardate representing the season number. The Okudas assume the start of a season is January 1 and the end of the season is December 31. The Next Generation, Deep Space Nine, and Voyager television series, as well as the movies, have roughly followed "real time", and are set around 377 years after their release.

Since the Chronology was published, it has been generally adhered-to by the producers of the show. The film Star Trek: First Contact and prequel series Star Trek: Enterprise both revisit the early era. In First Contact, Zephram Cochrane is confirmed as having invented warp drive on Earth, but the date is moved forward slightly to 2063, and it is revealed that Earth's official first contact with an alien species, the Vulcans, took place immediately afterwards as a result of this.

Enterprise is set in the 2150s, and ties into the Cochrane backstory. The show uses the Gregorian calendar instead of Stardates, making tracking the dating easier. Its pilot, "Broken Bow", depicts first contact with the Klingons occurring much earlier than the Okuda chronology anticipated (it suggested a date of 2218, based on a line in "Day of the Dove", noting that dialog in "First Contact" makes this problematic). It shows the opening of the Romulan war and the start of a coalition between Earth, Vulcan, Andor, and Tellar in the 2150s. The date of the founding year of the Federation, 2161, was revealed in the fifth-season TNG episode "The Outcast," based on an early draft of the Okuda timeline. The final episode of Enterprise, "These Are the Voyages...", is consistent with the establishment of 2161 as the founding year for the Federation.

No version of the Chronology or the Encyclopedia has been published since 1999. A 2006 book by Jeff Ayers contains a timeline which attempts to date all of the many Star Trek novels. This timeline has The Motion Picture in 2273, to account for the two-and-a-half-year gap between the end-date of 2270 established in "Q2" and the events of the movie.

=== Eugenics Wars and World War III ===
When the original series of Star Trek was produced, the 1990s were several decades away, and so various elements of the backstory to Star Trek are set in that era, particularly the Eugenics Wars. The references to the Eugenics Wars and to a nuclear war in the 21st century are somewhat contradictory.

The episode "Space Seed" establishes the Eugenics Wars, and has them lasting from 1992 to 1996. The Eugenics Wars are described as a global conflict in which the progeny of a human genetic engineering project, most notably Khan Noonien Singh, established themselves as supermen and attempted world domination. Spock calls them "the last of your so-called World Wars", and McCoy identifies this with the Eugenics Wars.

In the episode "Bread and Circuses", Spock gives a death toll for World War III of 37 million. The episode "The Savage Curtain" features a Colonel Phillip Green, who led a genocidal war in the 21st century. The TNG episode "Encounter at Farpoint" further establishes a "post-atomic horror" on Earth in 2079. However, the movie Star Trek: First Contact put the contact between Vulcans and humans at April 5, 2063.

The Star Trek Concordance identifies the "Bread and Circuses" figure as the death toll for a nuclear World War III, in the mid-21st century. Star Trek: First Contact firmly establishes World War III ended, after a nuclear exchange, in 2053, but with a body count of 600 million. The figure of Colonel Green is elaborated on in Star Trek: Enterprise. First Contact also deliberately describes the warring parties in World War III as "factions", not nations per se.

The Voyager episode "Future's End" saw the Voyager crew time-travel to Los Angeles in 1996, which, as the Encyclopedia notes, seems entirely unaffected by the Eugenics Wars, which ended that year. The episode acknowledges the issue only by featuring a model of Khan's DY-100-class ship on a 1996 desk. Khan's spaceship is another anomaly for the timeline, which has a variety of long-lost spaceships being launched between 1980 and 2100, with inconsistent levels of technology (caused by the increasing real lifetime and also decreased optimism about the pace of space exploration).

A reference in the Deep Space Nine episode "Doctor Bashir, I Presume?" suggests that the Eugenic Wars instead took place in the 22nd century. According to writer Ronald D. Moore, this was not an attempt at a retcon, but a mistake – when writing the episode, he recalled the already questionable "two centuries ago" line from "Space Seed" and forgot that DS9 takes place over 100 years later.

Season 4 of Star Trek: Enterprise involves a trilogy of episodes ("Borderland", "Cold Station 12", and "The Augments") related to scientist Doctor Arik Soong, ancestor of Doctor Noonien Soong, and his genetic augmentations of Humans. Numerous historical details of the devastating Eugenics Wars are discussed: the death of 35–37 million people; how Earth's governments could not decide on the fate of the 1,800 genetically enhanced embryos; and how Soong had infiltrated the complex and stolen and raised 19 embryos himself. Soong maintained that he himself and humanity in general had learned the lessons of the Eugenics Wars and should not continue to hide behind those events when there was progress to be made now that the technology had matured and was much more practicable. (The actions of his "children" convince him otherwise, and at the end of "The Augments" Soong declares his interest in cybernetics, beginning the work which would one day bring about Data.)

Greg Cox's two-book series The Eugenics Wars: The Rise and Fall of Khan Noonien Singh develops the idea of the Eugenics Wars in the context of real-life history by representing it as a secret history, and that the truth behind the various civil wars and conflicts in the 1990s was not generally known; Los Angeles, whose appearance in "Future's End" helped bring the war's existence into question, is portrayed as an EW "battlefront", the Rodney King riots being one such calamity.

The series Star Trek: Strange New Worlds, which first aired in spring 2022 explicitly dates the Eugenics Wars to the first half of the 21st century. The episode "Tomorrow and Tomorrow and Tomorrow" features a young Khan Noonien-Singh, long before his insurrection, and is set in the 2020s, and in the series premiere "Strange New Worlds", Christopher Pike describes footage with "Stop the Steal" placards as being the prelude to the second American Civil War and leading up to the Eugenics Wars and World War III. A time-travelling character in "Tomorrow and Tomorrow and Tomorrow" says that events that were "supposed to happen back in 1992".

=== Cochrane ===
In the episode "Metamorphosis", it is stated that Zefram Cochrane of Alpha Centauri, the discoverer of the space warp, disappeared 150 years ago, at the age of 87. In the Spaceflight Chronology timeline this would put his birth in the 1970s. The Star Trek Chronology timeline dates Cochrane's birth to 2030. The first edition Star Trek Chronology notes that Cochrane's invention of warp drive must have been at least 200 years before "Where No Man Has Gone Before", and suggests a date of 2061.

The film Star Trek: First Contact, released between the two editions of the Okudas' chronology, prominently features Cochrane's first successful warp flight. The film is set in 2063, two years after the Okudas' suggestions, and therefore by the timeline Cochrane is 33. The actor who played Cochrane in that movie, James Cromwell, was 56 at the time of the film's release. The second edition of the Okudas' Chronology notes the age issue, and offers an explanation that the Cromwell Cochrane had suffered from radiation poisoning, causing his aged appearance.

== See also ==
- Outline of Star Trek

== Notes ==
1. Except for the series finale – "These Are the Voyages..."
2. The events of "These are the voyages..." are displayed as a holodeck simulation. Episode itself takes place in 2370 (stardate 47457.1)
3. The film begins in the main timeline only to set up the alternate timeline.
4. Stardate 47457.1, parallel with The Next Generation episode "Pegasus"
