= Star Trek: Strange New Worlds season 2 =

Star Trek: Strange New Worlds
- Season 2
- Promotional poster
- Showrunners: Akiva Goldsman; Henry Alonso Myers
- Starring: Anson Mount; Ethan Peck; Jess Bush; Christina Chong; Celia Rose Gooding; Melissa Navia; Babs Olusanmokun; Rebecca Romijn
- No. of episodes: 10

Release
- Original network: Paramount+
- Original release: June 15 – August 10, 2023

Season chronology
- ← Previous; Season 1 Next → Season 3

The second season of the American television series Star Trek: Strange New Worlds follows Captain Christopher Pike and the crew of the starship Enterprise in the 23rd century as they explore new worlds and carry out missions during the decade before Star Trek: The Original Series (1966–1969). The season was produced by CBS Studios in association with Secret Hideout, Weed Road Pictures, H M R X Productions, and Roddenberry Entertainment, with Akiva Goldsman and Henry Alonso Myers as showrunners.

Anson Mount, Ethan Peck, and Rebecca Romijn respectively star as Pike, Spock, and Number One, along with Jess Bush, Christina Chong, Celia Rose Gooding, Melissa Navia, and Babs Olusanmokun. Many of the regular actors and several guest stars portray younger versions of characters from The Original Series. A second season of Strange New Worlds was confirmed in January 2022, prior to the release of the first season. Filming took place at CBS Stages Canada in Mississauga, Ontario, from February to July 2022. The showrunners continued the series' episodic storytelling approach, giving each episode a different genre and tone. This includes "Those Old Scientists", a crossover with the animated comedy series Star Trek: Lower Decks (2020–2024); and "Subspace Rhapsody", the franchise's first musical episode which features original songs by Tom Polce and Kay Hanley.

The season premiered on the streaming service Paramount+ on June 15, 2023, and ran for 10 episodes until August 10. It was estimated to have high viewership and audience demand, and was met with critical acclaim for its "genre-bending" episodes. The season received several accolades, including a Primetime Creative Arts Emmy Award nomination, Hugo Award nominations for "Those Old Scientists" and "Subspace Rhapsody", and a Saturn Award win. A third season was announced in March 2023.

== Episodes ==
No. overall	No. in season	Title	Directed by	Written by	Original release date
11	1	"The Broken Circle"	Chris Fisher	Henry Alonso Myers & Akiva Goldsman	June 15, 2023
While undergoing upgrades under the supervision of long-lived engineer Pelia, the starship USS Enterprise receives a distress call from security chief La'An Noonien-Singh on the mining planet Cajitar IV. With first officer Una Chin-Riley / Number One arrested and Captain Christopher Pike recruiting her defense counsel, Vulcan science officer Spock disobeys Admiral Robert April and steals the Enterprise. Spock and the crew find La'An on Cajitar IV and she explains that a cabal of ex-Starfleet and Klingon soldiers are plotting to restart the recently ended Klingon–Federation war. Dr. Joseph M'Benga and nurse Christine Chapel are captured and taken to a ship that has been cobbled together from Starfleet technology. The cabal plans to use it to fire on a Klingon ship and frame Starfleet. M'Benga and Chapel fight their way off the false flag ship just as Spock orders its destruction, saving the arriving Klingons. Spock bonds with the Klingon captain over drinks, impressing Pelia. April reprimands Spock, but is privately grateful that war with the Klingons was avoided considering the impending threat of the Gorn.
12	2	"Ad Astra per Aspera"	Valerie Weiss	Dana Horgan	June 22, 2023
Pike recruits Illyrian civil rights attorney Neera Ketoul as defense counsel for Number One. The prosecution, led by Pike's girlfriend Captain Marie Batel, easily builds a case that Number One violated Starfleet's anti–genetic modification laws by hiding her identity as a genetically modified Illyrian; Ketoul argues that the law is unjust and inconsistently applied, and points out that Admiral April has violated the Prime Directive when he believed it was the right thing to do. La'An—a descendant of the genetically modified warlord Khan Noonien Singh—investigates how Starfleet learned of Number One's status, worried that the information was taken from her own personal logs. Number One testifies about the oppression and marginalization Illyrians faced in her childhood, explains that she joined Starfleet because she believed it celebrated diversity, and reveals that she provided her own genetic status to Starfleet once it was known to the crew. Ketoul argues that Number One can be construed to have been seeking asylum when she joined Starfleet; the judges accept this interpretation and acquit Number One.
13	3	"Tomorrow and Tomorrow and Tomorrow"	Amanda Row	David Reed	June 29, 2023
A mysterious wounded man appears on the Enterprise, gives a time travel device to La'An, and dies. La'An finds herself in an alternate timeline where Earth is ravaged by war and the Enterprise is captained by James T. Kirk. The device transports her and Kirk to 2020s Toronto, where the pair form a romantic bond. They search for the point of divergence that caused the alternate timeline with help from a younger Pelia, and find a eugenics lab where a young Khan Noonien Singh is being raised. A Romulan time traveler named Sera intends to change human history by killing Khan and preventing the Eugenics Wars, which would keep humanity from the path that led to unity and the Federation. Sera kills Kirk and fights La'An, who kills Sera and saves Khan. La'An returns to the Enterprise in her own timeline and is thanked by a time-traveling investigator from the future, a colleague of the mysterious man, who confiscates the time travel device and swears La'An to secrecy. La'An contacts her timeline's Kirk, but he has no memory of her. She keeps a 20th-century watch that they used to find the eugenics lab.
14	4	"Among the Lotus Eaters"	Eduardo Sánchez	Kirsten Beyer & Davy Perez	July 6, 2023
Pike upsets Batel by suggesting that their relationship has harmed her career. The Enterprise is sent to the planet Rigel VII, the site of an earlier unsuccessful mission. Asteroids surrounding the planet emit radiation that makes people forget who they are. Pike, La'An, and M'Benga discover that Zac Nguyen, a yeoman presumed dead on the previous mission, has become a despotic ruler; he enforces a caste system where laborers lose their memories every night but he and his guards do not. The away team lose their memories and become laborers. Hearing a legend that their memories are stored in Nguyen's castle, Pike fights his way inside, defeats Nguyen, and learns that the castle itself blocks the radiation. The crew on the Enterprise also lose their memories, but pilot Erica Ortegas learns what her job is from the ship's computer and instinctively navigates away from the asteroids. The away team recover their memories and return to the Enterprise. They pull the main asteroid out of orbit, ridding Rigel VII of the radiation and restoring the laborers' memories. Pike apologizes to Batel and they resume their relationship.
15	5	"Charades"	Jordan Canning	Kathryn Lyn & Henry Alonso Myers	July 13, 2023
Spock and Chapel are nearly killed when they encounter a portal created by a higher-dimensional race, the Kerkhovians, who heal Chapel but accidentally reconfigure Spock's half-human, half-Vulcan physiology to that of a full-blooded human. This happens as Spock is preparing for an engagement ritual with his fiancée T'Pring and her bigoted parents T'Pril and Sevek. Spock's human mother Amanda Grayson boards the Enterprise to help Spock prepare. Spock does not tell T'Pring of his condition, hoping not to worry her, and relies on the crew to help disguise himself as Vulcan and stall the ritual until a cure is found. Chapel convinces the Kerkhovians to return Spock to normal by confessing to them her feelings for him. Spock is able to complete the ritual, which ends with him making a telepathic connection to his mother that shows him how difficult it is for a human to love a Vulcan. Spock then reveals the ruse to call out T'Pril's bigotry. Offended that Spock hid his condition from her, T'Pring asks to take a break from their relationship. Spock later admits to Chapel that he also has feelings for her and they kiss.
16	6	"Lost in Translation"	Dan Liu	Onitra Johnson & David Reed	July 20, 2023
The Enterprise joins the USS Farragut to repair a deuterium refinery. Ensign Nyota Uhura begins experiencing hallucinations of strange noises and frightening images, including the deaths of her parents and of former Enterprise engineer Hemmer. Pelia discovers that the refinery has been sabotaged. Saul Ramon, the officer responsible for the sabotage, is taken to sickbay; he exhibits symptoms similar to Uhura's. Ramon escapes sickbay and attempts to sabotage the Enterprise. Uhura pursues him and unsuccessfully attempts to calm him down; James Kirk, visiting from the Farragut, rescues her before Ramon is blown into space by an explosion. Uhura discusses her hallucinations with Kirk and he helps her realize that she needs to confront her grief about her parents and Hemmer rather than ignoring it. With the help of Kirk and his brother Sam, a xenoanthropologist, Uhura realizes that her hallucinations are messages from aliens who live in the deuterium and are being killed by the refinery. She reports her theory to Pike and he orders the refinery destroyed. Uhura later introduces James Kirk to Spock.
17	7	"Those Old Scientists"	Jonathan Frakes	Kathryn Lyn & Bill Wolkoff	July 22, 2023
In the 24th century, Ensign Brad Boimler of the USS Cerritos is assigned to investigate an ancient portal. The portal, which is powered by the rare substance horonium, sends him back in time 120 years where he is taken aboard the Enterprise. Boimler struggles to contain his excitement at meeting his heroes and also to prevent polluting the timeline with his knowledge of the future. The portal is stolen by an Orion ship and Pike trades grain supplies to retrieve it. They attempt to return Boimler to the future with the last remaining horonium, but Ensign Beckett Mariner comes through the portal instead in a rescue attempt. Spock and Boimler unsuccessfully try to synthesize horonium so they can use the portal again while Mariner and Uhura work to translate engravings on the portal. Boimler realizes that horonium from the hull of the previous starship Enterprise was incorporated into Pike's Enterprise. They use this to send Boimler and Mariner back to their own time, while the Orions agree to accept credit for discovering the portal in exchange for allowing the Enterprise to continue peacefully. Note: This episode is a crossover with Star Trek: Lower Decks.
18	8	"Under the Cloak of War"	Jeff W. Byrd	Davy Perez	July 27, 2023
The Enterprise hosts Ambassador Dak'Rah, a Klingon general who defected to the Federation and is said to have killed his own officers when he learned that they had ordered attacks on civilians while fighting on the moon of J'Gal. Veterans of the Federation–Klingon war, including Ortegas, M'Benga, and Chapel, are uncomfortable with his presence. M'Benga and Chapel served at a field hospital on J'Gal and witnessed the brutality of the Klingon forces under Dak'Rah's command. Dak'Rah invites M'Benga to join his campaign for peace, citing the symbolic power of a partnership between two men who were on opposing sides at J'Gal, and offers to help M'Benga find healing from the trauma he experienced. M'Benga rejects Dak'Rah's offer and eventually reveals that he knows it was Dak'Rah who ordered the attacks on civilians. It was M'Benga who killed the Klingon officers whose deaths Dak'Rah is taking credit for. A fight breaks out and M'Benga kills Dak'Rah with the same dagger with which he killed his officers. M'Benga tells Pike that he did not intend to kill Dak'Rah but he does not regret it.
19	9	"Subspace Rhapsody"	Dermott Downs	Dana Horgan & Bill Wolkoff	August 3, 2023
James Kirk, recently promoted to executive officer of the Farragut, visits the Enterprise to shadow Number One. While conducting communications experiments, Uhura broadcasts a recording of the song "Anything Goes" into a mysterious "subspace fold". It produces an "improbability field" that causes the Enterprise crew to begin singing about their feelings like characters in a musical film. Pike has an argument with Batel, in song, in front of the crew. Chapel wins a prestigious research fellowship and reveals in song that she prioritizes it over her relationship with Spock. La'An confesses her feelings for Kirk before the musical can force her to, but he is already in a relationship with Carol Marcus. An affected Klingon ship intends to blow up the fold, but experiments reveal this will destroy all starships in the fleet. Uhura determines that singing an upbeat grand finale will provide enough energy to close the improbability field before the Klingons arrive; she encourages the Enterprise crew to sing about the fulfillment they find in working together and exploring, and when the song concludes the improbability field dissipates.
20	10	"Hegemony"	Maja Vrvilo	Henry Alonso Myers	August 10, 2023
Batel's ship, the USS Cayuga, is ambushed by the Gorn while resupplying the human colony Parnassus Beta. Chapel is aboard the Cayuga, en route to her fellowship, and survives the attack. The Enterprise arrives to find the wreckage of the Cayuga and a Gorn device jamming communications and transporters. April orders them not to cross into Gorn-claimed space, but Pike secretly leads Ortegas, La'An, M'Benga, and Sam Kirk to the surface. They find Batel and other survivors, including Starfleet engineer Montgomery Scott who has built a device that imitates Gorn transponders. Pike learns that Batel is infected with Gorn eggs. Following a strategy suggested by Uhura and Pelia, Spock installs rockets on the Cayuga's wreckage so they can crash it into the jammer. He kills an attacking Gorn with help from Chapel. The jammer is destroyed, allowing the Enterprise to transport up Pike, Scott, and Batel. The latter is taken straight to medical. The Gorn capture La'An, M'Benga, Ortegas, Sam, and the other survivors. Pike is forced to decide whether to follow orders and retreat or stay to rescue his captured crew.

== Cast and characters ==
=== Main ===
- Anson Mount as Christopher Pike
- Ethan Peck as Spock
- Jess Bush as Christine Chapel
- Christina Chong as La'An Noonien-Singh
- Celia Rose Gooding as Nyota Uhura
- Melissa Navia as Erica Ortegas
- Babs Olusanmokun as Joseph M'Benga
- Rebecca Romijn as Una Chin-Riley / Number One

=== Recurring ===
- Adrian Holmes as Robert April
- Carol Kane as Pelia
- Melanie Scrofano as Marie Batel
- Paul Wesley as James T. Kirk
- Dan Jeannotte as George Samuel "Sam" Kirk
- Bruce Horak as Hemmer and Garkog

=== Notable guests ===
- Mia Kirshner as Amanda Grayson
- Gia Sandhu as T'Pring
- Tawny Newsome as Beckett Mariner
- Jack Quaid as Brad Boimler
- Noël Wells as the voice of D'Vana Tendi
- Eugene Cordero as the voice of Sam Rutherford
- Jerry O'Connell as the voice of Jack Ransom
- Clint Howard as Buck Martinez
- Martin Quinn as Montgomery Scott

== Production ==
=== Development ===
After beginning development on Star Trek: Strange New Worlds, a spin-off from the series Star Trek: Discovery (2017–2024), executive producer Alex Kurtzman said he wanted it to be an ongoing series rather than a miniseries, and said it could explore the seven years between Discovery's second season (2019) and the accident that seriously injures Christopher Pike in Star Trek: The Original Series (1966–1969). In November 2021, a second season of Strange New Worlds was reported to be starting production in February 2022. Frequent Star Trek director Jonathan Frakes confirmed the season order a month later, before Paramount+ officially announced it in January 2022. The first episode is dedicated to Nichelle Nichols, who portrayed the character Nyota Uhura in The Original Series and other Star Trek media, following her death in July 2022.

=== Writing ===
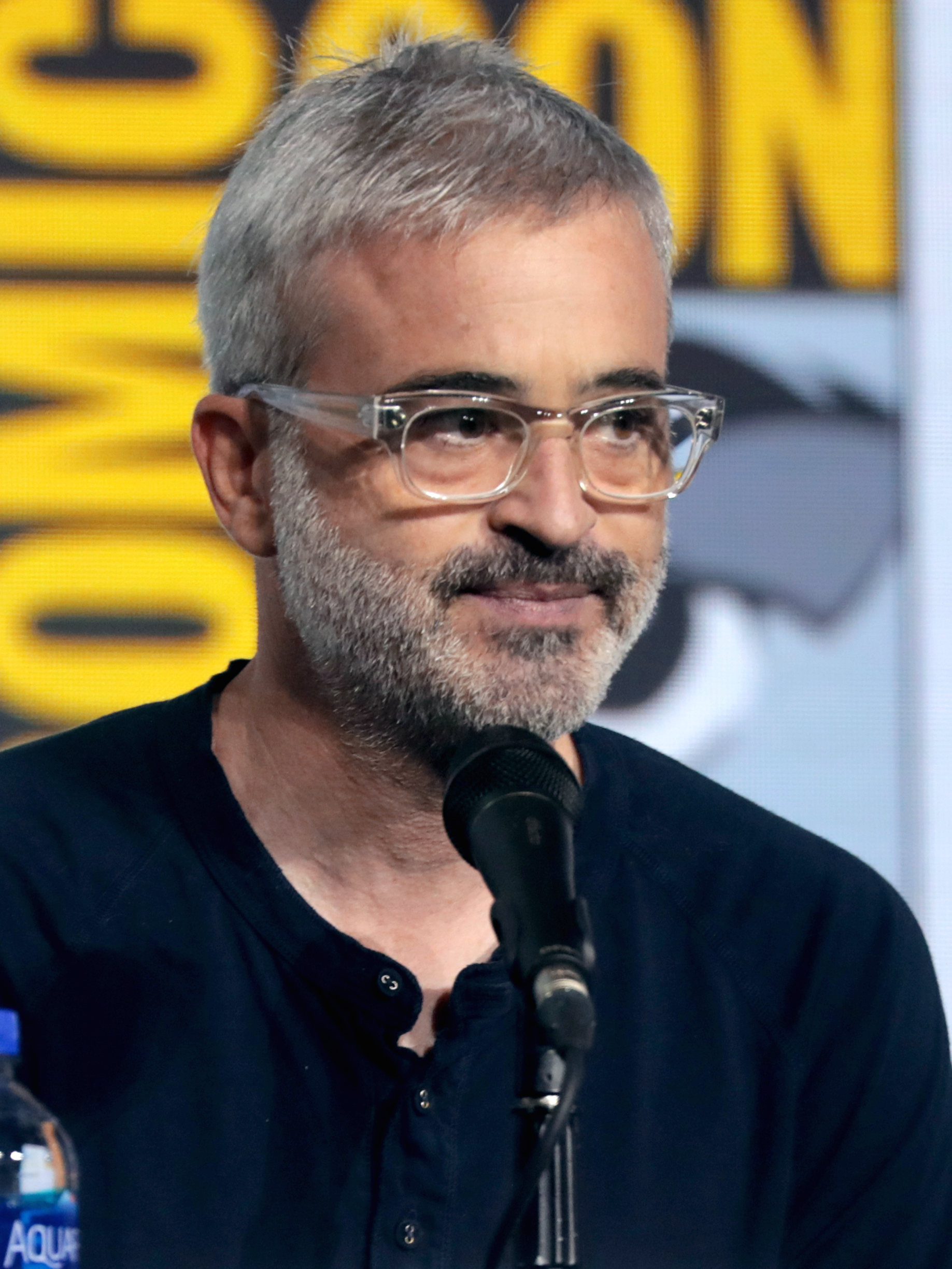
Executive producer Alex Kurtzman discussed a crossover between different Star Trek series and a potential musical episode before those ideas were both used for this season.

Work on the second season began before the release of the first in May 2022. The first season was structured with standalone episodes and season-long character arcs, which was a departure from the more serialized style of Discovery. Unsure how the new style would be received by fans, showrunners Henry Alonso Myers and Akiva Goldsman chose to commit to it. Myers said the second season would "go for broke" in differentiating its episodes with unique genres, and Goldsman added that it would have some "creative stretches" and "big swings" that had not been seen in the franchise before. The season includes the romantic time travel tragedy "Tomorrow and Tomorrow and Tomorrow"; the comedic "Charades"; "Those Old Scientists", a crossover with the animated comedy series Star Trek: Lower Decks (2020–2024); the dark and morally complex war story "Under the Cloak of War"; and the franchise's first full musical episode, "Subspace Rhapsody". Kurtzman first discussed a potential musical episode for the Star Trek franchise in July 2020, and he first said there was potential for the different Star Trek series to crossover in December 2021. The season's writers' room included Dana Horgan, David Reed, Kirsten Beyer, Davy Perez, Kathryn Lyn, Onitra Johnson, and Bill Wolkoff.

Myers said the second season would follow-up on the "serialized threads" left by the first season, including the arrest of Number One for being a genetically modified Illyrian, the death of chief engineer Hemmer, and La'An Noonien-Singh taking a leave of absence from the USS Enterprise (NCC-1701). The writers also developed new character arcs for the season, including relationships between Spock and Christine Chapel, Pike and Marie Batel, and La'An and James T. Kirk. These all culminate in the ninth episode, "Subpsace Rhapsody", which was determined before the writers decided that it would be a musical. Because Pike star Anson Mount expected to have a child around the start of filming, the first episode, "The Broken Circle", was written to focus on the rest of the cast. The explanation for Pike's absence is that he goes to recruit a defense counsel for Number One. This storyline continues in the second episode, "Ad Astra per Aspera", which features Number One's trial, continuing a Star Trek tradition of courtroom-focused episodes. Myers said he and Goldsman did not know how they would resolve the Number One story when they added it as a cliffhanger in the first-season finale, and they were glad when the writers came up with a "straight-down-the-middle classic Trek episode" to address it.

On the series' approach to Star Trek canon, Myers said they were focused on creating interesting characters for the actors to perform and the audience to watch rather than referencing previous media. Goldsman said knowing the end point of the characters' stories in previous projects allowed the writers to come up with new and interesting ways to get there which they might otherwise have not thought of. The episode "Lost in Translation" depicts the first canonical meetings between James Kirk, the Enterprise captain from The Original Series, and key characters such as Pike, Spock, and Uhura. In The Original Series, Kirk says he met Pike when the latter was promoted to Fleet Captain; the episode depicts Pike being temporarily promoted to that rank, allowing the season to align with The Original Series while moving the first meeting between Pike and Kirk to be earlier in the timeline than had previously been presumed. After the first season referenced the Eugenics Wars as taking place in the mid-21st century rather than the 1990s, which had been established in The Original Series, the second-season episode "Tomorrow and Tomorrow and Tomorrow" explains that those events have shifted in the timeline due to interference from time travelers during the Temporal Cold War in Star Trek: Enterprise (2001–2005). Goldsman said the real-world reasoning for this was so modern audiences could still believe that the franchise takes place in the future.

The writers wanted to revisit the recurring threat of the Gorn, a lizard-like alien species introduced in The Original Series that were reimagined for modern audiences in the first season. They wanted to depict adult Gorn, which they avoided doing in the first season, and the time needed to complete the design work for this led to the species being saved for one of the later episodes. They ultimately appear in the second-season finale, which ends on a surprise cliffhanger ending inspired by the Star Trek: The Next Generation episode "The Best of Both Worlds, Part I" (1990). Myers admitted that this was a risky decision considering a third season was not yet confirmed.

=== Casting ===
Anson Mount, Ethan Peck, and Rebecca Romijn star in the series as Captain Christopher Pike, science officer Spock, and first officer Una Chin-Riley / Number One, respectively. Also starring are Jess Bush as nurse Christine Chapel, Christina Chong as chief security officer La'An Noonien-Singh, Celia Rose Gooding as Ensign Nyota Uhura, Melissa Navia as helmsman Erica Ortegas, and Babs Olusanmokun as Dr. Joseph M'Benga.

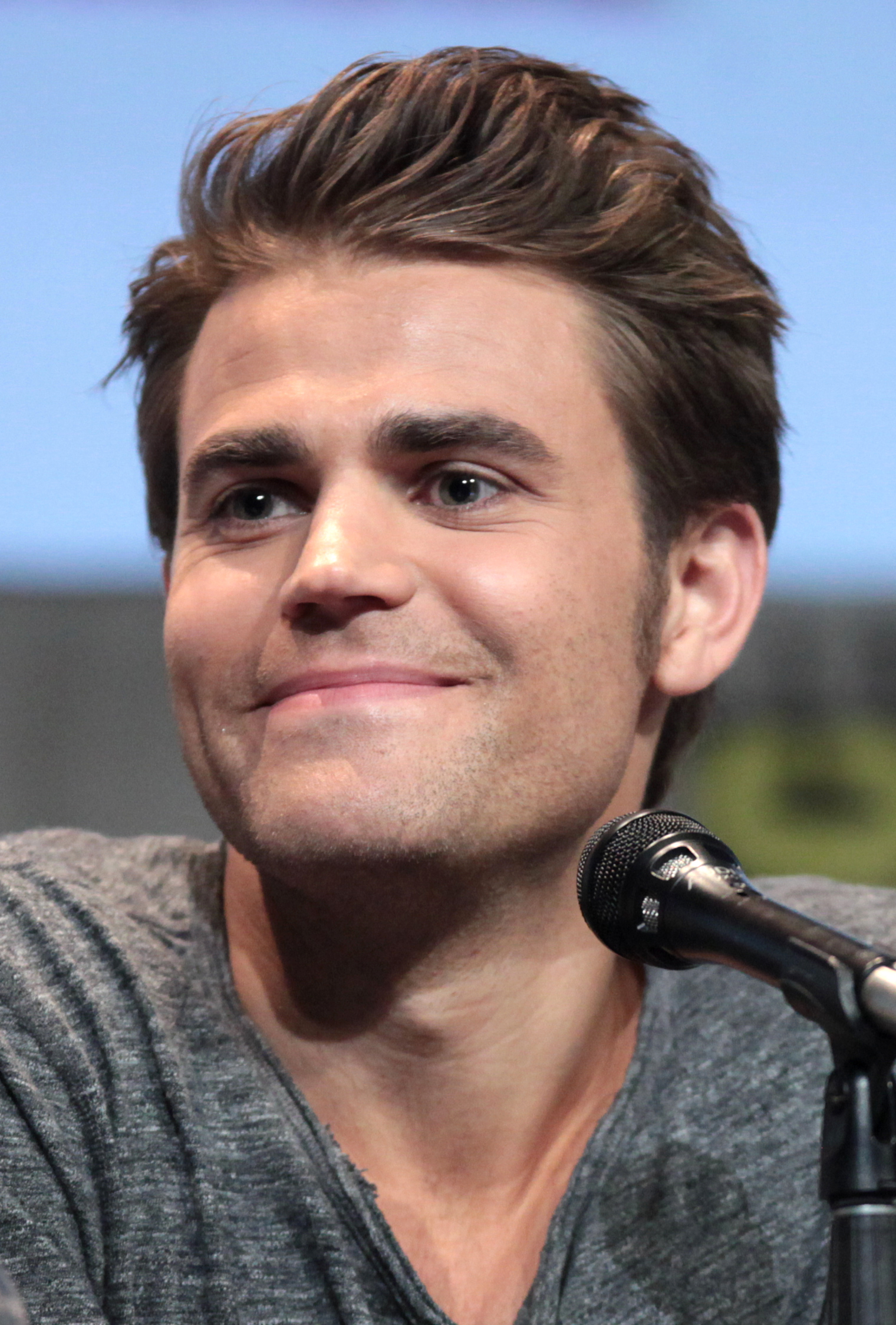
After his introduction in the first-season finale, Paul Wesley returned to guest star as James T. Kirk in multiple second-season episodes.

In March 2022, Paul Wesley was revealed to have been cast for the season as James Kirk, who was portrayed in The Original Series by William Shatner. Wesley's casting was announced before the premiere of the first season, after he was spotted filming for the second season on location in Toronto. Myers cautioned fans about making assumptions regarding Kirk's involvement in the series since the science fiction genre allowed them to introduce the character in various ways. He added that they did not want to "leave a story on the table" and decided to explore a young Kirk in this time period after already exploring other The Original Series characters such as Spock, Uhura, and Chapel. Following multiple unsuccessful auditions with other actors, Myers and Goldsman approached Wesley and hired him after just having a conversation. The actor made a surprise first appearance as Kirk during the first-season finale where he played an alternate version from a potential future that Pike visits. He played a different alternate version of the character in the second-season episode "Tomorrow and Tomorrow and Tomorrow", one from a dark timeline who has never been to Earth. Wesley did not want to imitate Shatner for his performances, but said his portrayal of a younger Kirk in the second season would be closer to Shatner's than his portrayal of the alternate versions. Coincidentally, Wesley was once neighbors with Shatner, and the pair happened to share a plane ride around the time Wesley's casting was announced; Shatner gave Wesley his blessing. The second season explores the relationship between James Kirk and his brother George Samuel "Sam" Kirk, played by returning guest star Dan Jeannotte.

Bruce Horak said the first-season death of his character, chief engineer Hemmer, would not be the end of his involvement in the series; Horak returned as Hemmer for a recording that Uhura watches in "Lost in Translation", and also guest starred as the Klingon General Garkog in "Subspace Rhapsody". Myers said the second season would introduce a new engineer who would not be Montgomery Scott, the future chief engineer of the Enterprise as portrayed by James Doohan in The Original Series. Though Scott had a brief role in the first-season finale as part of a potential future that Pike visits, Myers explained that they were not ready to bring the character into the series' main events or cast a new actor in the role which is why that finale cameo was offscreen with a voice actor providing the lines. In September 2022, Carol Kane was revealed to have a recurring role in the second season as the new engineer, Pelia. The character is a Lanthanite, a new species created for the season that appears human but is very long-lived. Kane chose to create a new accent for the character that is different from all the other characters in the series, so the audience would not be able to work out where she comes from. She used this in a table read of the season premiere, held over Zoom, and the producers responded positively. Scott is introduced in the season finale as a junior officer and former student of Pelia, played by Scottish theater actor Martin Quinn. Following the controversial Scottish accents used by Canadian actor Doohan and English actor Simon Pegg, who portrayed Scott in several Star Trek films, Myers wanted to cast an actual Scottish actor in the role and looked at 30 to 50 different actors before Quinn was hired.

With the announcement of the Lower Decks crossover in July 2022, Tawny Newsome and Jack Quaid were revealed to be reprising their respective roles as Beckett Mariner and Brad Boimler from that series. The characters appear in both live-action and animation, while Noël Wells, Eugene Cordero, and Romijn's husband Jerry O'Connell reprise their voice roles as D'Vana Tendi, Sam Rutherford, and Jack Ransom for animation. Also returning from previous Star Trek series in the season are Mia Kirshner as Spock's mother Amanda Grayson, an Original Series character who Kirshner first portrayed in Discovery, and frequent Star Trek actor Clint Howard in a new guest role for the eighth episode. Other guest stars returning from the first season include Adrian Holmes as Admiral Robert April, Melanie Scrofano as Pike's girlfriend Captain Marie Batel, and Gia Sandhu as Spock's fiancée T'Pring. Additionally, Rong Fu returns as operations officer Jenna Mitchell; Noah Lamanna portrays transporter chief Jay, replacing André Dae Kim's transporter chief Kyle from the first season after Kim left to star in the series Vampire Academy (2022); Alex Kapp again provides the voice of the Enterprise's computer; and Desmond Sivan portrays a young version of Ricardo Montalban's Star Trek villain Khan Noonien Singh.

=== Design ===
Additional design work was required during pre-production for the series' virtual production technology, creating digital backgrounds to display on an LED video wall during filming. Visual effects company Pixomondo worked with the art department to design these environments, and a dedicated "virtual art department" was created for the season. In addition to the sets that production designer Jonathan Lee and his team built for the first season, the second season also features sets for the Enterprise's port galley, science lab, nacelle room, and shuttle bay. Lee described the port galley, which is the ship's lounge and bar, as "our new baby". It was built for the kind of scenes that were filmed in the mess hall during season one. The change was made because the mess hall used virtual production technology and required digital space environments to be created for each scene. In contrast, the port galley has no windows. The large, round shape of the courtroom set in "Ad Astra per Aspera" was inspired by the Federation command set from Discovery. Lee added hand-carved alien sculptures to the walls that were inspired by the frieze panels inside the United States Supreme Court Building. The set also includes an updated version of the "verifier" or lie-detector chair from the Original Series episode "Court Martial" (1967).

After establishing the characters and Starfleet uniforms in the first season, costume designer Bernadette Croft said the second season was about showing character development through costumes. Her team had around two weeks to prepare for each episode, which was a short amount of time for episodes that required drastically different costumes. Updated versions of the dress uniforms from the Original Series episode "The Menagerie" (1966) were created for the courtroom scenes in "Ad Astra per Aspera". They were made from the same fabric as the normal uniforms and have the same silhouette, but with gold detailing around the collars and down the front to match the original designs. Ranks are shown on the shoulders as with admiral uniforms. The Lower Decks uniforms were recreated in live action for the crossover episode, using the same fabric as the series' other uniforms but without microprint details to more closely match the simple, flat designs in the animated series. The characters on the mining planet Cajitar IV in "The Broken Circle" wear rough and gritty costumes appropriate for a "down-and-dirty, gritty flea market scene". Croft wanted them to be covered in a "muted gray metallic residue". She said the biggest episode for the costume team was "Among the Lotus Eaters", which required the medieval-style costumes to be broken down to look like the Rigel VII workers have been wearing them for years while exposed to the planet's extreme weather. The guards' costumes in the episode were inspired by Mongolian armor.

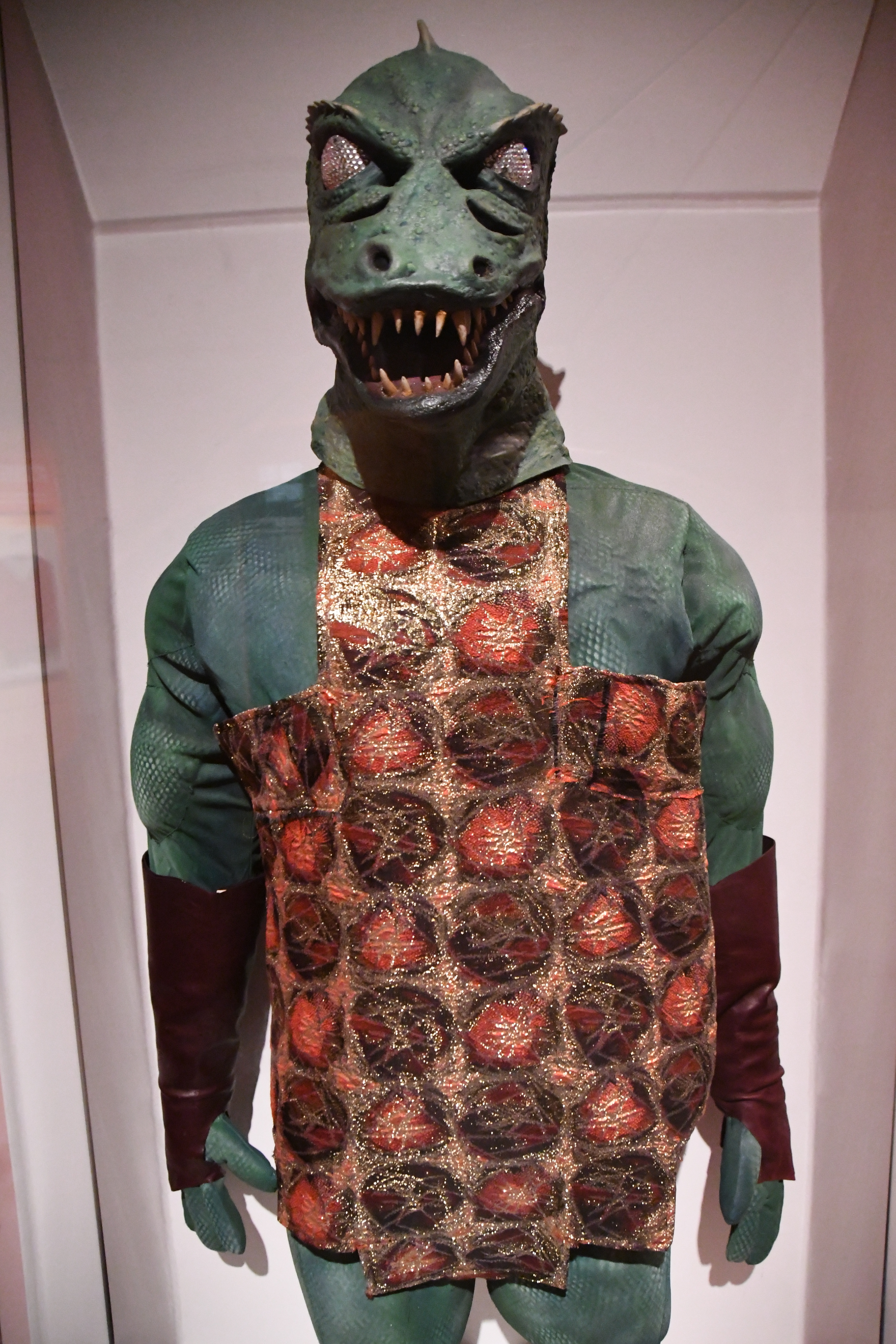
The alien Gorn species was redesigned from the costume used in The Original Series (left). Legacy Effects provided the new design (right).

Legacy Effects provided alien prosthetics and animatronics for the season. Though an adult Gorn is not seen until the second-season finale, the company designed the full Gorn life cycle for the first season so they could work back from the adult design to portray hatchlings and younglings. Legacy co-founder J. Alan Scott said they wanted to be respectful to the design from The Original Series while meeting the high expectations of how the Gorn should be portrayed. Kurtzman was excited to elevate the Gorn from the original "guy in a rubber suit" and make them feel "vivid and scary". Goldsman wanted to turn them into a "real monster" that seems irredeemable, to help with the lesson of The Original Series that "we start by seeing the other and often we end by engaging our empathy and understanding common ground". Scott said it was a challenge to make the design monstrous but also show that this is a sentient and intelligent species with advanced technology. He compared the Gorn to the portrayal of Velociraptors in the Jurassic Park franchise, which he also worked on. The Gorn in the finale is wearing an EV suit that hides a lot of the adult design, except for the face. After seeing the designs for the Gorn ships in the first season, Legacy redesigned the EV suit to match the ships' technology and "tumble and roll" movements. The EV suit and Gorn head were built as a creature suit that was worn on set by stunt performer Warren Scherer. This was augmented with visual effects for movements that the practical suit could not do. Scott was excited to reveal more of the Gorn design, without the EV suit, in future episodes, and to explore more of the species' technology and potential language.

Designs for the Klingons are closer to those of past Star Trek series and films than the significant redesign that was done for Discovery. The showrunners said they wanted the series to be closer to the original shows in all aspects and this decision was not made to avoid the controversial Discovery changes. Myers added, "I like to imagine that Klingons are a diverse species, and that means there are many different looks the Klingons have." The prosthetics are based on the Next Generation design but use modern techniques and materials, and were easier to apply than the Discovery ones. Croft created updated versions of the black and gold Klingon costumes from The Original Series, but elevated with more details to avoid the original "dance costumes" look. The armor was hand-sculpted by special effects artist Alex Silberberg and includes exoskeleton detailing.

=== Filming ===
Filming began on February 1, 2022, at CBS Stages Canada in Mississauga, Ontario, under the working title Lily and Isaac. Glen Keenan returned as cinematographer from the first season and was joined by Benji Bakshi and Ian Alexander. The season again used Arri Alexa LF cameras with Cooke Optics's Anamorphic/i Special Flare lenses. Producing director Chris Fisher directed the first episode. He and the producers encouraged the directors and cinematographers to approach each episode like a film and use the Enterprise as a mood board that reflected the emotions of each genre. Bakshi suggested Valerie Weiss, who he had worked with before, as a potential director, and she was chosen to direct the second episode. Weiss had worked on several courtroom-based series before, and watched the previous Star Trek trial episodes as research. Pike's visit to the Illyrian colony was filmed on location in Toronto. Weiss and Bakshi ensured there was always something between Number One and the camera until she takes the stand, showing that she does not open up until then.

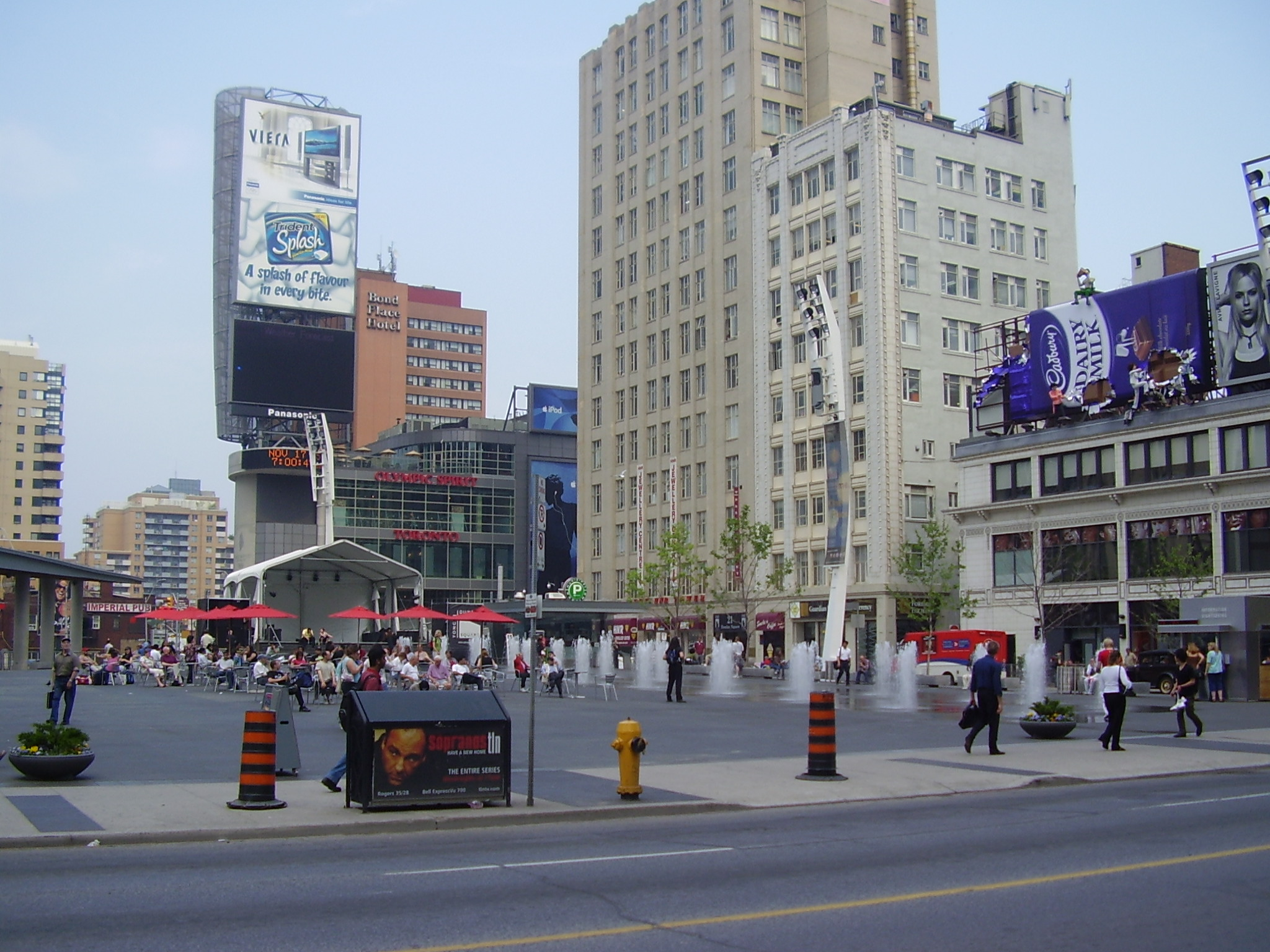
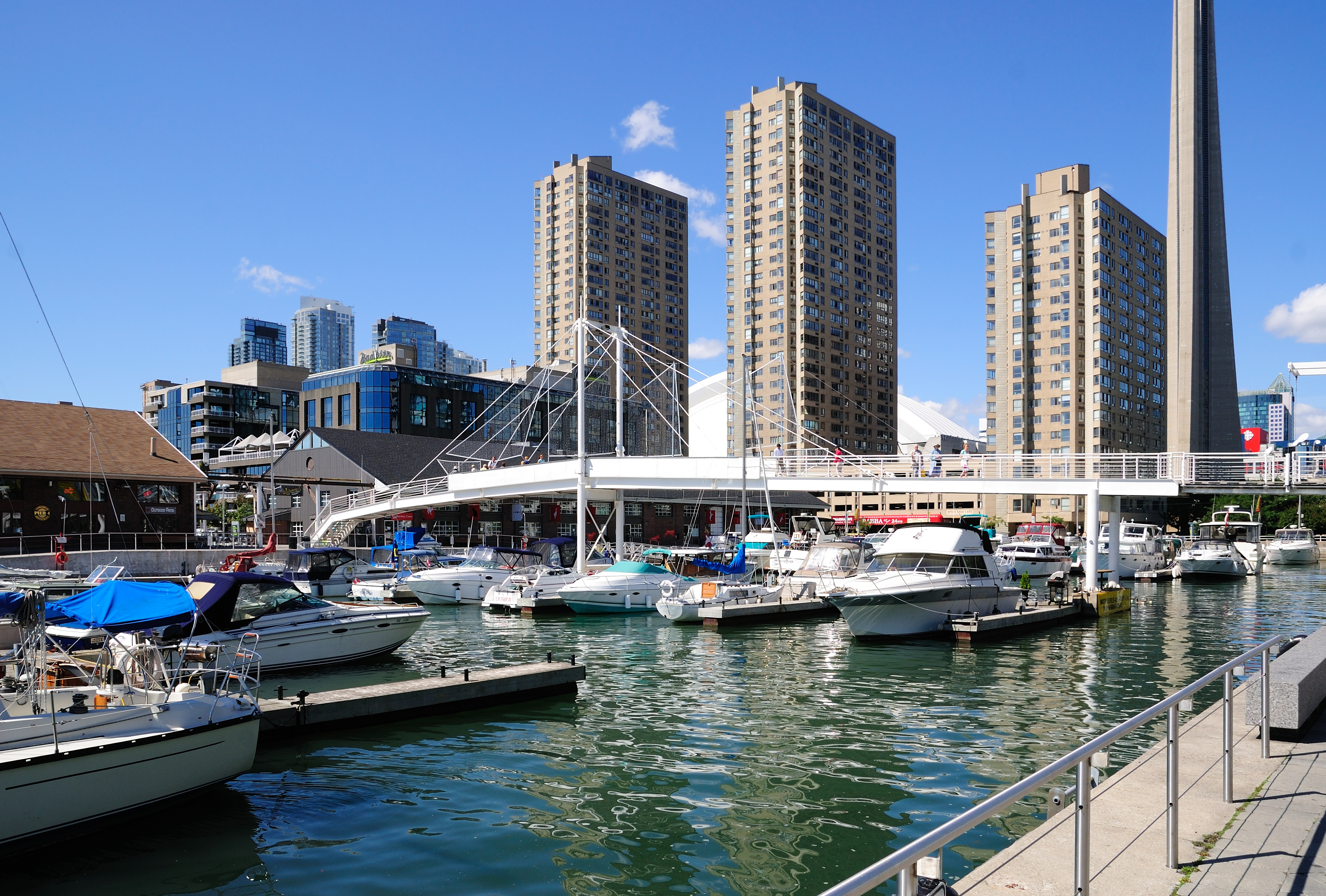
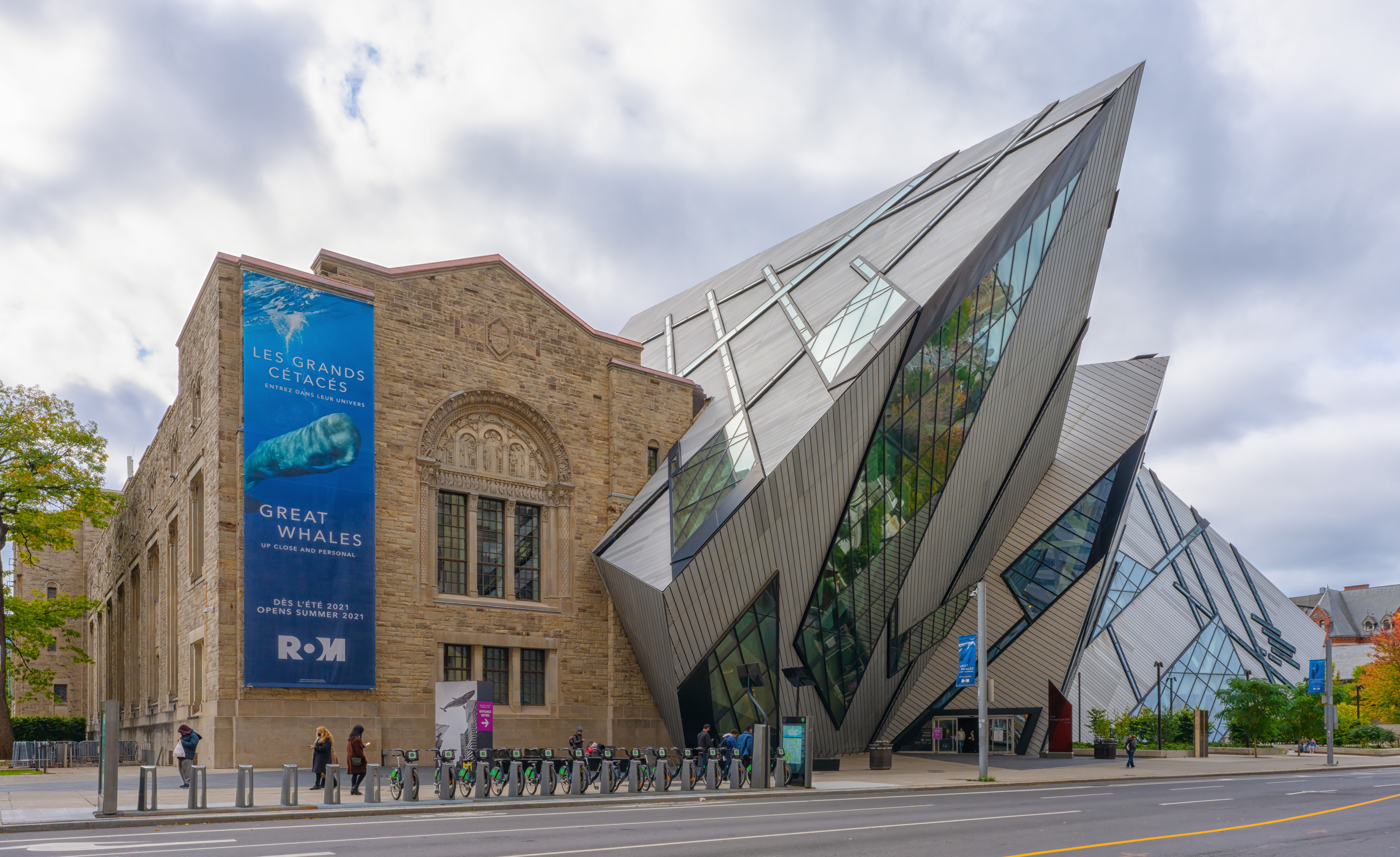
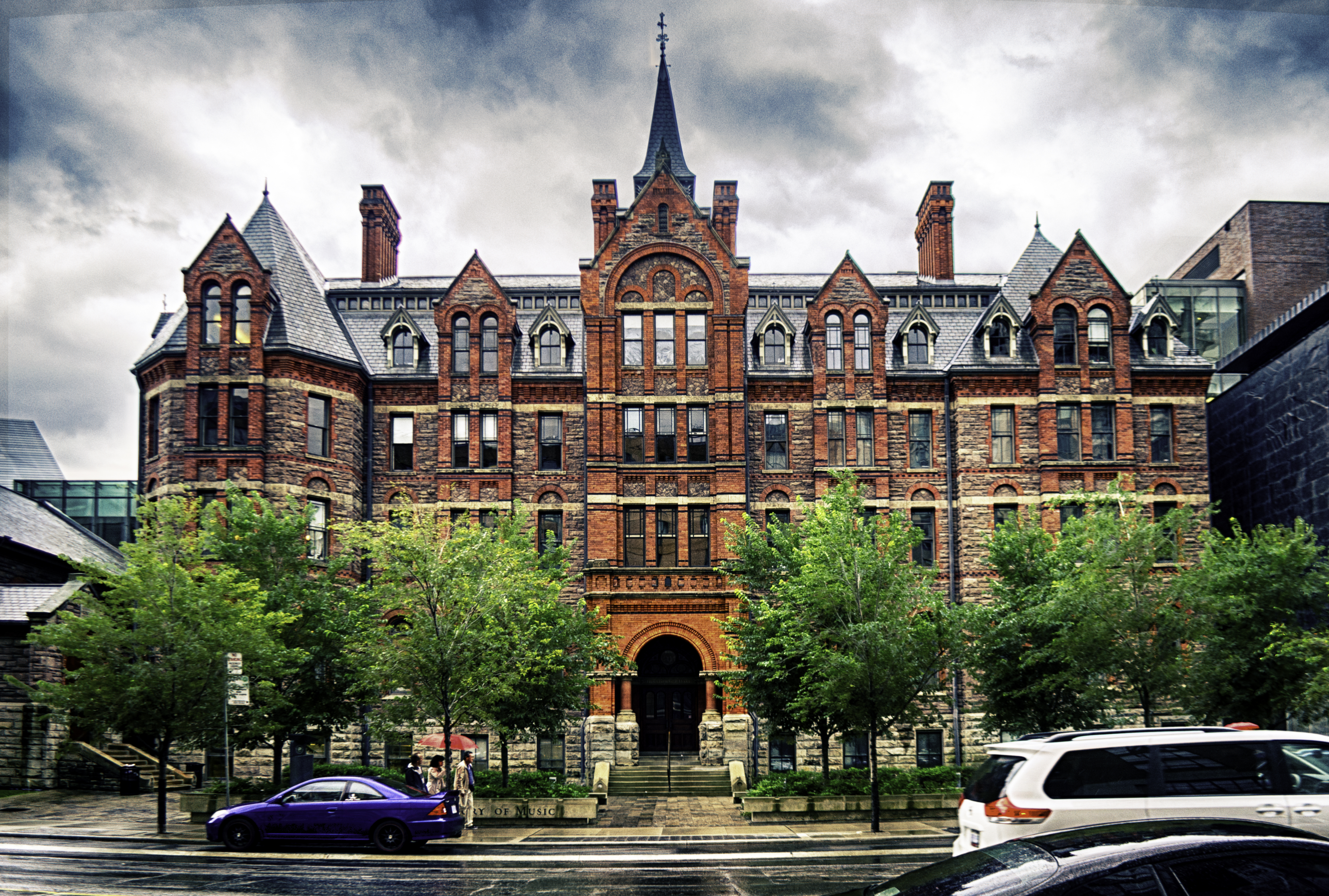
The third episode was filmed on location in Toronto, including at (left-to-right, top-to-bottom) Yonge-Dundas Square, Harbourfront, the Royal Ontario Museum, and the Royal Conservatory of Music.

By March 14, Amanda Row had begun directing the third episode, with filming taking place over several weeks on location in Toronto; Wesley's casting was revealed when he was spotted during filming. The writers originally intended to film the episode on location in New York City, but realized that this would be too expensive. They then considered filming Toronto as if it was New York City, as had been done for many other films and series, before deciding to just set the episode in Toronto. Row and much of the crew were from Toronto and excited to have it depicted as itself in the episode. Filming locations included Yonge-Dundas Square, Harbourfront, the Port Lands, David Pecaut Square, the Royal Ontario Museum, and the Royal Conservatory of Music's headquarters which stood-in for the eugenics lab at the end of the episode.

Eduardo Sánchez was brought in "last minute" for the fourth episode after the planned director had to pull out, and had a month-and-a-half to prepare. A long-time Star Trek fan, Sánchez was excited about the episode's "old-school" Original Series tone and avoided modern-style camera movements. Exterior scenes were filmed using the video wall, though the producers considered filming the quarry sequence on location. Sánchez decided against this after scouting potential locations, as he felt they would not match the video wall and the weather would cause scheduling issues. He used a hand-held camera to show Ortegas's mental state in the scene where she loses her memories, inspired by the horror genre. Scenes inside the Rigel VII castle were filmed at the end of March in the Mount Community Center in Peterborough, Ontario, which is a former convent. Jordan Canning directed the fifth episode, and was drawn to the comedic elements. She watched the first season as research and said the episode "Spock Amok" was the "sister episode" to this one. Canning and Keenan planned many shots ahead of time, but an approach they discovered during filming was to frame Spock from behind to see the reactions of other characters; they found multiple places to use this framing, which Canning compared to the directing style of the Coen Brothers.

After being prevented from working on the first season when the COVID-19 pandemic impacted his directing schedule on Star Trek: Picard (2020–2023), Jonathan Frakes travelled to Toronto during the week of April 4 to start production on the seventh episode. Filming for the sixth episode, which was directed by Dan Liu, began by the week of April 11, and was still underway at the end of the month. The episode includes the first meeting between Spock and James Kirk, a significant moment considering the important relationship that they have in the franchise. Peck and Wesley discussed the moment a lot and chose to play it as meeting "just another Starfleet officer" because the characters do not know the significance of the meeting. For the eighth episode, writer Davy Perez was inspired by the Original Series episode "A Private Little War" (1968) and the Star Trek: Deep Space Nine episode "The Siege of AR-558" (1998), and director Jeff W. Byrd wanted to bring those influences to the screen. He was also inspired by war films and researched real-life black ops teams. Byrd wanted to immerse the audience through close-ups. He worked closely with Perez, Bush, and Olusanmokun on the episode's war scenes, incorporating suggestions from Bush and Olusanmokun based on their own research into combat medics. Byrd filmed the climactic fight between M'Benga and Dak'Rah in multiple ways, and the producers chose a version where the fight is obscured behind opaque glass. Dermott Downs was hired to direct the musical episode after directing a similar musical episode for The Flash (2014–2023). He began work two weeks before the normal preparation period began, giving him extra time to plan each musical sequence, while the cast learned their songs and dance choreography during production on earlier episodes, including on weekends. The season finale was directed by Maja Vrvilo. Filming wrapped on July 1.

=== Visual effects and animation ===
In addition to working on the virtual production technology, Pixomondo also provided traditional visual effects for the season. Other visual effects vendors for the series included Crafty Apes, Ghost VFX, FX3X, Vineyard VFX, Boxel Studio, Barnstorm VFX, and Storm Studios. Visual effects supervisor Jason Zimmerman said the approach for Strange New Worlds was to try find a "happy medium" between taking advantage of the latest visual effects technology while also staying true to the look and effects of The Original Series. Ghost VFX worked on different alien environments and creatures during the season, including the Gorn for the finale. Legacy's practical Gorn suit was augmented with digital facial animation, drool, and breath, and replaced entirely with a digital version for some shots. Zimmerman said the finale was a technical challenge but also came to be some of his favorite work for the series, noting that it features a zero gravity sequence with the Gorn inside the destroyed hull of a starship. Interior shots of this sequence required digital set extensions while the exterior of the damaged ship was completely digital. The Alien franchise was an especial reference for the episode, with Zimmerman wanting to match what the earlier Alien films managed to do without digital effects.

Lower Decks showrunner Mike McMahan was involved in the crossover episode's animated scenes, which used the same animation team and style as Lower Decks; independent animation studio Titmouse provided the animation for that series. The episode has a new version of the series' title sequence animated in the style of Lower Decks and featuring some Easter eggs that reference the animated series.

=== Music ===
Composer Nami Melumad began work on the season by late July 2022. She recorded her music for the season with a 55-piece orchestra, an increase from the 37-piece orchestra used for the first season, and introduced a choir. Tom Polce and Kay Hanley of the band Letters to Cleo were hired to write original songs for "Subspace Rhapsody". They worked with the cast to determine each actor's vocal range. Main theme composer Jeff Russo arranged a new version of the theme, combining a cappella-style vocals with an orchestra, for the episode. A soundtrack album for the episode was released digitally by Lakeshore Records on August 4, 2023. After announcing a full soundtrack album for the third season in November 2025, and having previously released one for the first season in April 2023, Lakeshore said there were no plans to do so for the second season.

== Marketing ==
The series was discussed during the Star Trek Universe panel at San Diego Comic-Con in July 2022, when the crossover with Lower Decks was announced. Kane's casting was announced at another panel for the series at a "Star Trek Day" event on September 8, where a clip from the season was shown. The first teaser for the season was released in April 2023, ahead of Picard's series finale. Commentary on the teaser focused on the return of Wesley's James Kirk, the appearance of Klingons with their updated designs, and on the lack of footage from the Lower Decks crossover episode. The next month, a full trailer was released alongside the key art poster and a clip from Number One's trial. Discussion of the trailer primarily highlighted the first look at the Lower Decks crossover. Rotem Rusak at Nerdist described the trailer as "short and to the point", and said it promised that "we're going to go deep into the crew's adventures" in the second season. Christian Blauvelt at IndieWire agreed that the series was "definitely delivering another character-based season of storytelling", based on the trailer, and he said the Lower Decks crossover looked to be more ambitious than Katee Sackhoff reprising her animated Star Wars role of Bo-Katan Kryze in the live-action series The Mandalorian (2019–2023).

In June 2023, Bush participated in a panel discussion, titled "How Science Fiction Has Impacted Space Exploration and Policy", at the Kennedy Space Center Visitor Complex. The Next Generation and Deep Space Nine writer Morgan Gendel was also on the panel. A video was shown of Mount reading a message from NASA to the series' cast and crew during filming. Soon after that event, Gooding, Navia, Romijn, and Peck promoted the season at MCM Comic Con London. Technology from Canadian company ARHT was used to have the four appear as live "holograms" on the stage in London, despite Gooding and Navia being in New York and Romijn and Peck being in Los Angeles. Another San Diego Comic-Con panel was held for the season in July, but members of the cast were unable to attend because of the 2023 SAG-AFTRA strike. The crossover episode "Those Old Scientists" was shown in full at the panel, and the musical episode "Subspace Rhapsody" was officially announced with a trailer and poster. The latter was inspired by posters for classic Hollywood musical films.

== Release ==
=== Streaming and broadcast ===
The season premiered on the streaming service Paramount+ in the United States, United Kingdom, Australia, Latin America, Brazil, France, Italy, Germany, Switzerland, and Austria on June 15, 2023. The rest of the season's 10 episodes were expected to be released weekly until August 17. After the seventh episode, "Those Old Scientists", debuted early at Comic-Con on July 22, Paramount+ announced that it was also being released on the streaming service that same day. The season's remaining episodes were subsequently each moved up a week, bringing the release of the season finale forward to August 10. The season was released in Canada by Bell Media (broadcast on CTV Sci-Fi Channel before streaming on Crave), in New Zealand on TVNZ, in India on Voot, and in other European countries on SkyShowtime (a combination of Paramount+ and the streaming service Peacock). In August 2023, Star Trek content was removed from Crave and the season began streaming on Paramount+ in Canada. It would continue to be broadcast on CTV Sci-Fi and be available on CTV.ca and the CTV app.

=== Home media ===
The season was released on DVD, Blu-Ray, and Limited Edition Steelbook formats in the US on December 5, 2023. The release includes over two hours of bonus features, including deleted and alternate scenes, and featurettes on the season's props, costumes, locations, and the Gorn. The Steelbook format includes a mini-poster for "Subspace Rhapsody" as well as character magnets.

== Reception ==
=== Viewership ===
Whip Media, which tracks viewership data for the 19 million worldwide users of its TV Time app, ranked Strange New Worlds in the top 10 original streaming series for US viewership each week an episode of the season was released. It was the top ranked series for the week ending August 6. JustWatch, a guide to streaming content with access to data from more than 20 million users around the world, included Strange New Worlds on its list of top 10 streaming series in the US for the weeks ending June 25, July 2, and August 13. Parrot Analytics determines audience "demand expressions" based on various data sources, and the company calculated that Strange New Worlds was the 6th-most in demand US streaming series for the week ending June 16 (the season premiered on June 15). Parrot said the series was 33.4 times more in demand than the average US streaming series, which was a 53 percent rise from the previous week when the series was the 18th-most in demand. It remained in the top 5 of Parrot's weekly list until the week ending July 14, peaking at third-most in demand.

Nielsen Media Research records streaming viewership on US television screens, and estimated that Strange New Worlds was watched for nearly 1 billion minutes during June 2023. This helped Paramount+ get to one percent of the total streaming television viewership for that month. Viewership for the season was high enough to enter Nielsen's list of the top 10 original streaming programs in the US for each week an episode of the season was released, except for the weeks ending July 2 and 16. Nielsen reported that Paramount+ had the largest increase in viewership for a streaming service during August 2023 and partially attributed this to the season.

=== Critical response ===
The season was met with critical acclaim for its "genre-bending" episodes and for breathing new life into the franchise. On review aggregator website Rotten Tomatoes, 97% of 97 critics reviews were positive and the average of rated reviews was 8.45 out of 10. The critics consensus reads, "Boldly going where this hallowed franchise has gone before with effervescent execution, Strange New Worlds's superb sophomore season continues to recapture classic Trek with modern verve." Metacritic, which uses a weighted average, assigned a score of 88 out of 100 based on 11 reviews, which the site categorizes as "universal acclaim".

=== Accolades ===
Yetide Badaki and Rebecca Romijn were named honorable mentions for TVLine's "Performers of the Week" for the week of June 18, 2023, for their performances in the episode "Ad Astra per Aspera". The site praised Romijn's "subtle yet powerful" performance and Badaki's "otherworldly charm" as big wins for the series despite the episode's small victory. The site also named Babs Olusanmokun as an honorable mention for his performance in "Under the Cloak of War", which they called a "stunning, tour-de-force performance" that added complex new layers to M'Benga, as well as Celia Rose Gooding for her performance in "Subspace Rhapsody".

In July 2023, critics at Vanity Fair, Esquire, and Vulture all included the season on their lists of best series of the year so far. At the end of the year, the series was named on best television series lists for 2023 by Den of Geek (2nd), USA Today (5th), Esquire (6th), Paste (13th), TVLine (13th), and Polygon (33rd), as well as by Gizmodo, Nerdist, Slant, and Vanity Fair on unranked lists. Additionally, Scott D. Pierce of The Salt Lake Tribune included the season as "No. 1–A" on his list as part of his first-place entry for Picard. Some episodes were named on lists of best television episodes for 2023: "Ad Astra per Aspera" by Polygon; "Charades" by /Film (10th), IndieWire (22nd), and Rolling Stone; "Those Old Scientists" by Mashable (16th); and "Subspace Rhapsody" by Salon (7th) and TV Insider.

Accolades received by the second season of Star Trek: Strange New Worlds
Award	Date of ceremony	Category	Recipient(s)	Result	Ref.
American Society of Cinematographers Awards	March 3, 2024	Outstanding Achievement in Cinematography in an Episode of a One-Hour Regular Series	Glen Keenan (for "Hegemony")	Nominated	
Australian Production Design Guild Awards	August 24, 2024	Concept Art Award	Daniel J Burns	Won	
Critics' Choice Super Awards	April 4, 2024	Best Science Fiction/Fantasy Series, Limited Series or Made-For-TV Movie	Star Trek: Strange New Worlds	Nominated	
Critics' Choice Super Awards	April 4, 2024	Best Actor in a Science Fiction/Fantasy Series, Limited Series or Made-For-TV Movie	Anson Mount	Nominated	
Critics' Choice Super Awards	April 4, 2024	Best Actress in a Science Fiction/Fantasy Series, Limited Series or Made-For-TV Movie	Celia Rose Gooding	Nominated	
Critics' Choice Television Awards	January 14, 2024	Best Drama Series	Star Trek: Strange New Worlds	Nominated	
Critics' Choice Television Awards	January 14, 2024	Best Supporting Actress in a Drama Series	Celia Rose Gooding	Nominated	
Hollywood Professional Association Awards	November 28, 2023	Outstanding Sound — Episode or Non-Theatrical Feature	Matthew E. Taylor, Michael Schapiro, Todd Grace, Ed Carr III, and Sean Heissinger (for "Hegemony")	Nominated	
Hugo Awards	August 11, 2024	Best Dramatic Presentation, Short Form	Jonathan Frakes, Kathryn Lyn, and Bill Wolkoff (for "Those Old Scientists")	Nominated	
Hugo Awards	August 11, 2024	Best Dramatic Presentation, Short Form	Dermott Downs, Dana Horgan, and Bill Wolkoff (for "Subspace Rhapsody")	Nominated	
Primetime Creative Arts Emmy Awards	September 7, 2024	Outstanding Sound Editing for a Comedy or Drama Series (One-Hour)	Matthew E. Taylor, Michael Schapiro, Sean Heissinger, Kip Smedley, Ian Herzon, Deron Street, Clay Weber, John Sanacore, Rick Owens, and Jesi Ruppel (for "Hegemony")	Nominated	
Saturn Awards	February 4, 2024	Best Science Fiction Television Series	Star Trek: Strange New Worlds	Nominated	
Saturn Awards	February 4, 2024	Best Actor in a Television Series	Anson Mount	Nominated	
Saturn Awards	February 4, 2024	Best Supporting Actor in a Television Series	Ethan Peck	Nominated	
Saturn Awards	February 4, 2024	Best Supporting Actress in a Television Series	Jess Bush	Nominated	
Saturn Awards	February 4, 2024	Best Supporting Actress in a Television Series	Celia Rose Gooding	Nominated	
Saturn Awards	February 4, 2024	Best Guest Star in a Television Series	Paul Wesley	Won	
Visual Effects Society Awards	February 21, 2024	Outstanding Created Environment in an Episode, Commercial, Game Cinematic or Real-Time Project	Nathaniel Larouche, Owen Deveney, Mujia Liao, and Alex Morin (for "The Broken Circle")	Nominated	
