= Stardate =

System of time measurement in Star Trek

A stardate is a fictional system of time measurement developed for the television and film series Star Trek. In the series, use of this date system is commonly heard at the beginning of a voice-over log entry, such as "Captain's log, stardate 41153.7. Our destination is planet Deneb IV …" (Encounter at Farpoint). While the original method was inspired by the Modified Julian date system currently used by astronomers, the writers and producers have selected numbers using different methods over the years, some more arbitrary than others. This makes it impossible to convert all stardates into equivalent calendar dates, especially since stardates were originally intended to avoid specifying exactly when Star Trek takes place.

== Original stardate ==
The original 1967 Star Trek Guide (April 17, 1967, p. 25) instructed writers for the original Star Trek TV series on how to select stardates for their scripts. Writers could pick any combination of four numbers plus a decimal point, and aim for consistency within a single script, but not necessarily between different scripts. This was to "avoid continually mentioning Star Trek's century" and avoid "arguments about whether this or that would have developed by then". Though the guide sets the series "about two hundred years from now", the few references within the show itself were contradictory, and later productions and reference materials eventually placed the series between the years 2265 and 2269. The second pilot, "Where No Man Has Gone Before", begins on stardate 1312.4 and the last-produced episode, "Turnabout Intruder", on stardate 5928.5. Though the dating system was revised for Star Trek: The Next Generation, the pilot of Star Trek: Discovery follows the original series' dating system, starting on stardate 1207.3, which is stated precisely to be Sunday, May 11, 2256.

== Revised stardate ==
Subsequent Star Trek series followed a new numerical convention. Star Trek: The Next Generation (TNG) revised the stardate system in the 1987 Star Trek: The Next Generation Writer's/Director's Guide, to five digits and one decimal place. According to the guide, the first digit "4" should represent the 24th century, with the second digit representing the television season. The remaining digits can progress unevenly, with the decimal representing the time as fractional days. Stardates of Star Trek: Deep Space Nine began with 46379.1, corresponding to the sixth season of TNG, which was also set in the year 2369. Star Trek: Voyager began with stardate 48315.6 (2371), one season after TNG had finished its seventh and final season. As in TNG, the second digit would increase by one every season, while the initial two digits eventually rolled over from 49 to 50, despite the year 2373 still being in the 24th century. Star Trek: Nemesis was set around stardate 56844.9. Star Trek: Discovery traveled to the year 3188, giving a stardate of 865211.3, corresponding to that year in this system of stardates.

On March 9, 2023, Star Trek: Picard gave a stardate of 78183.10. This indicates a continuity with TNG. Each stardate increment represents one milliyear, with 78 years in 2401, counted from 2323. The decimal represents a fractional day. Thus, stardates are a composition of two types of decimal time.

== Decimal point ==
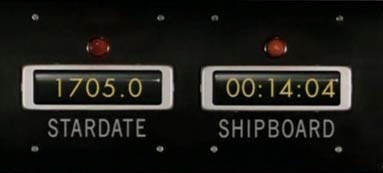
Ship’s chronometer

Stardates usually are expressed with a single decimal digit, but sometimes with more than one. For instance, The Next Generation episode, "The Child", displays the stardate 42073.1435. According to The Star Trek Guide, the official writers' guide for the original series:

For example, 1313.5 is twelve o'clock noon of one day and 1314.5 would be noon of the next day. Each percentage point (sic) is roughly equivalent to one-tenth of one day.

Likewise, page 32 of the 1988 Star Trek: The Next Generation Writer's/Director's Guide for season two states:

…the digit following the decimal point counts one-tenth of a day.

This was demonstrated by the ship's chronometer in the TOS-Remastered episode, "The Naked Time," and by Captain Varley's video logs in the TNG episode "Contagion". The latter displays several stardates with two decimal digits next to corresponding times.

== Other stardates ==
Additional Star Trek media have generated their own numbering systems. The 2009 MMORPG Star Trek Online began on stardate 86088.58, in the in-game year 2409, counting 1000 stardates per year from May 25, 1922. Writer Roberto Orci revised the system for the 2009 film Star Trek so that the first four digits correspond to the year, while the remainder was intended to stand for the day of the year, in effect representing an ordinal date. In the first installment of the movie trilogy, Spock makes his log of the destruction of Vulcan on stardate 2258.42, or February 11, 2258. Star Trek Into Darkness begins on stardate 2259.55, or February 24, 2259. Star Trek Beyond begins on stardate 2263.02, or January 2, 2263. In The Big Bang Theory episode, "The Adhesive Duck Deficiency", Sheldon Cooper gives the stardate 63345.3, corresponding with the date of the Leonid meteor shower that year, November 17, 2009.

== See also ==
- Timeline of Star Trek
- Ordinal date
