= Fred Goldstein =

Member of the Secretariat of the American Workers World Party (1938–2023)

- Born: November 14, 1938; New York, New York, U.S.
- Died: April 11, 2023 (aged 84)
- Occupation: Leader of the Workers World Party

Fred Goldstein (November 14, 1938 – April 11, 2023) was a member of the Secretariat, the six-member leading body, of the American Workers World Party. He was a contributing editor of Workers World, and frequently wrote economic analyses for the paper. Goldstein's book Low Wage Capitalism: Colossus With Feet of Clay was published in 2008 by World View Forum.
