= Star Trek Spaceflight Chronology =

1980 book by Stan Goldstein and Fred Goldstein

- Author: Stan Goldstein; Fred Goldstein
- Illustrator: Rick Sternbach
- Cover artist: Rick Sternbach
- Language: English
- Series: Star Trek genre continuity
- Subject: Star Trek:TOS, Star Trek: The Motion Picture, pre-Star Trek: The Original Series and pre-Star Trek: Enterprise storyline conjecture
- Genre: Fiction, Star Trek
- Publisher: Pocket Books
- Publication date: 1980
- Publication place: United States
- Media type: Print
- Pages: 192
- ISBN: 0-671-79089-7
- OCLC: 5905863
- Dewey Decimal: 818/.5407
- LC Class: TL788.7 .G64
- Followed by: Star Trek Chronology; Voyages of Imagination

Star Trek Spaceflight Chronology is a 1980 book written and edited by Stan Goldstein and Fred Goldstein, and illustrated by Rick Sternbach. At the time of its publication it was the official history of the Star Trek universe. The first season of Star Trek: The Next Generation used references and dates that indicated that the Star Trek Spaceflight Chronology was no longer being followed, and it was eventually replaced by Star Trek Chronology as the official history of the Star Trek universe. "Spaceflight" was later declared apocrypha in 2002. In 2006, Pocket Books published Voyages of Imagination, which expanded Star Trek Chronology to include the events of all of the Star Trek novels.

== See also ==
- Timeline of Star Trek – Early Chronologies

== Sources ==
- Goldstein, Stan; Fred Goldstein; Rick Sternbach (1980). Star Trek Spaceflight Chronology. Pocket Books. ISBN 0-671-79089-7.
- Okuda, Mike; Denise Okuda (1993). Star Trek Chronology: The History of the Future. Pocket Books. ISBN 0-671-79611-9.
- "'Canon' Books?". Star Trek: The Magazine. Vol. 2, no. 11. March 2002.
- Ayers, Jeff (2006). Voyages of Imagination. Pocket Books. ISBN 1-4165-0349-8.
- Mayer III, Emmett (May 5, 2009). "The Star Trek universe timeline: A chronology of the future". The Times-Picayune.
