= List of Star Trek characters =

This article lists characters in the various canonical incarnations of Star Trek. This includes fictional main and major characters created for the franchise.

== Key ==
Abbreviation	Title	Date(s)	Medium
TC	"The Cage" (Star Trek: The Original Series)	1966	TV
TOS	Star Trek: The Original Series	1966–1969	TV
TAS	Star Trek: The Animated Series	1973–1974	TV
TMP	Star Trek: The Motion Picture	1979	film
TWOK	Star Trek II: The Wrath of Khan	1982	film
TSFS	Star Trek III: The Search for Spock	1984	film
TVH	Star Trek IV: The Voyage Home	1986	film
TFF	Star Trek V: The Final Frontier	1989	film
TUC	Star Trek VI: The Undiscovered Country	1991	film
TNG	Star Trek: The Next Generation	1987–1994	TV
DS9	Star Trek: Deep Space Nine	1993–1999	TV
GEN	Star Trek Generations	1994	film
VOY	Star Trek: Voyager	1995–2001	TV
FC	Star Trek: First Contact	1996	film
INS	Star Trek: Insurrection	1998	film
NEM	Star Trek: Nemesis	2002	film
ENT	Star Trek: Enterprise	2001–2005	TV
ST09	Star Trek (2009)	2009	film
STID	Star Trek Into Darkness	2013	film
STB	Star Trek Beyond	2016	film
DSC	Star Trek: Discovery	2017–2024	TV
SHO	Star Trek: Short Treks	2018–2020	TV
PIC	Star Trek: Picard	2020–2023	TV
LOW	Star Trek: Lower Decks	2020–2024	TV
PRO	Star Trek: Prodigy	2021–2024	TV
SNW	Star Trek: Strange New Worlds	2022–present	TV
S31	Star Trek: Section 31	2025	film
SFA	Star Trek: Starfleet Academy	2026–present	TV

== Main and recurring characters ==
Character	Actor(s)	Appearances	Rank	Posting	Position	Species
Airiam	Sara Mitich	Seasons 1–2 (DSC)	Lt. Commander	USS Discovery	Science officer	Human cyborg
Airiam	Hannah Cheesman	Seasons 1–2 (DSC)	Lt. Commander	USS Discovery	Science officer	Human cyborg
Jonathan Archer	Scott Bakula	Seasons 1–4 (ENT)	Captain	Enterprise NX-01	Commanding officer	Human
Asencia	Jameela Jamil	Seasons 1-2 (PRO)	Civilian; Ensign	Solum; USS Dauntless	Tyrant; Navigator	Vau N’Akat
Soji Asha	Isa Briones	Seasons 1-2 (PIC)	Civilian	Romulan Reclamation Site	Anthropologist	Android
Ayala	Tarik Ergin	Seasons 1–7 (VOY)	Lieutenant, JG (provisional)	USS Voyager	Helmsman (S7); Security officer (S1-7); Maquis (previous)	Human
Azan	Kurt Wetherill	Seasons 6–7 (VOY)	Civilian	USS Voyager Passenger		Wysanti/xB
Reginald Barclay	Dwight Schultz	Seasons 3–4,6–7 (TNG); Movies (FC); Seasons 2,6–7 (VOY)	Lt. Commander (VOY); Lieutenant, JG (TNG, FC)	Starfleet Command (VOY); USS Enterprise-E (FC); USS Enterprise-D (TNG)	Pathfinder Project (VOY); Engineering officer (TNG, movies)	Human
Bareil Antos	Philip Anglim	Seasons 1–3,6 (DS9)	Vedek	Bajor resident	Bajoran religious leader (S1-3)	Bajoran
Julian Bashir	Alexander Siddig	Seasons 1–7 (DS9); Season 6 (TNG)	Lieutenant (S4-7); Lieutenant, JG (S1-3)	Deep Space 9	Chief medical officer	Human
Marie Batel	Melanie Scrofano	Seasons 1–3(SNW)	Captain	USS Cayuga (Seasons 1-2)	Commanding officer	Human
B'Etor	Gwynyth Walsh	Seasons 4–5,7 (TNG); Movies (GEN); Season 1 (DS9)	Commander, Klingon Empire	Bird of Prey	First officer	Klingon
Brad Boimler	Jack Quaid	Seasons 1-5 (LOW) Season 2 (SNW) (Those Old Scientists)	Ensign (Seasons 1-3); Lieutenant, JG (Season 4)	USS Cerritos (Seasons 1-4), USS Titan (Season 2)		Human
Cleveland "Book" Booker	David Ajala	Seasons 3-5 (DSC)	Civilian	USS Discovery 1031-A	Courier, Starfleet consultant	Kwejian
Boothby	Ray Walston	Season 5 (TNG); Season 5 (VOY)	Civilian	Starfleet Academy	Groundskeeper	Human
Borg Queen	Alice Krige	Seasons 5–7 (VOY); Movies (FC); Season 2 (PIC)	None	Borg Collective	Leader of Borg Collective	Borg
Borg Queen	Susanna Thompson	Seasons 5–7 (VOY); Movies (FC); Season 2 (PIC)	None	Borg Collective	Leader of Borg Collective	Borg
Borg Queen	Annie Wersching	Seasons 5–7 (VOY); Movies (FC); Season 2 (PIC)	None	Borg Collective	Leader of Borg Collective	Borg
Phillip Boyce	John Hoyt	"The Cage"	Lt. Commander	USS Enterprise	Chief medical officer	Human
Brunt	Jeffrey Combs	Seasons 3–7 (DS9)	Civilian	Ferenginar resident	Ferengi commerce liquidator	Ferengi
Ronald Altman Bryce	Ronnie Rowe Jr.	Seasons 1–3 (DSC)	Lieutenant Commander (DSC S4); Lieutenant, JG	USS Curie (DSC S4); USS Discovery	Communications officer	Human
Gabrielle Burnham	Sonja Sohn	Seasons 2-3 (DSC)	None	Section 31	Intelligence operative Astrophysicist	Human
Michael Burnham	Sonequa Martin-Green	Seasons 1–5 (DSC)	Captain (S4-5) Commander (S1-3; Crewman (S1)	USS Discovery (S1-2); USS Shenzhou (S1)	Captain (S4-5); First officer (S3); Science officer (S2); Science specialist (S1); First officer (S1)	Human
Michael Burnham	Arista Arhin (as a child)	Seasons 1–5 (DSC)	Captain (S4-5) Commander (S1-3; Crewman (S1)	USS Discovery (S1-2); USS Shenzhou (S1)	Captain (S4-5); First officer (S3); Science officer (S2); Science specialist (S1); First officer (S1)	Human
Joseph Carey	Josh Clark	Seasons 1,5–7 (VOY)	Lieutenant	USS Voyager	Engineering officer	Human
Chakotay	Robert Beltran	Seasons 1-2 (PRO); Seasons 1–7 (VOY)	Captain; Commander (provisional)	USS Protostar (PRO S1); USS Voyager S1-7	Captain (PRO S1); First officer (VOY S1-7); Maquis (S1)	Human
Christine Chapel	Majel Barrett	Seasons 1–3 (TOS); Seasons 1–2 (TAS); Movies (TMP, TVH)	Commander (TMP, TVH); Crewman (TOS, TAS)	Starfleet Command (TVH); USS Enterprise (TOS, TAS, TMP)	Starfleet Command officer (TVH); Medical officer (TMP); Nurse (TOS, TAS)	Human
Christine Chapel	Jess Bush	Seasons 1-3 (SNW)	Crewman (SNW)	USS Enterprise (SNW)	Nurse (SNW)	Human
Pavel Chekov	Walter Koenig	Seasons 2–3 (TOS); Movies (TMP, WOK, SFS, TVH, TFF, TUC, GEN); Season 5 (DS9)	Commander (WOK, SFS, TVH, TFF, TUC, GEN); Lieutenant (TMP)	USS Enterprise-A (TVH, TFF, TUC); USS Reliant (WOK); USS Enterprise (TOS, TMP, SFS)	Chief security officer (SFS, TVH, TFF, TUC); First officer (WOK); Weapons officer (TMP); Navigator (TOS)	Human
Pavel Chekov	Anton Yelchin	ST09, STID, STB	Ensign (ST09, STID, STB)	USS Enterprise (ST09, STID, STB)	Navigator (ST09, STID, STB)	Human
Una Chin-Riley ('Number One')	Majel Barrett	"The Cage"; Season 2 (DSC); Seasons 1-2 (SNW)	Commander; Lt. Commander	USS Enterprise	First officer	Illyrian
Una Chin-Riley ('Number One')	Rebecca Romijn	"The Cage"; Season 2 (DSC); Seasons 1-2 (SNW)	Commander; Lt. Commander	USS Enterprise	First officer	Illyrian
J. M. Colt	Laurel Goodwin	"The Cage"	Yeoman	USS Enterprise	Yeoman	Human
Katrina Cornwell	Jayne Brook	Seasons 1-2 (DSC)	Vice Admiral	Starfleet Command	Admiral of Starfleet	Human
Kimara Cretak	Adrienne Barbeau	Season 7 (DS9)	Senator	Deep Space 9	Romulan representative	Romulan
Kimara Cretak	Megan Cole	Season 7 (DS9)	Senator	Deep Space 9	Romulan representative	Romulan
Beverly Crusher	Gates McFadden	Seasons 1,3–7 (TNG); Movies (GEN, FC, INS, NEM); Season 2 (PRO); Season 3 (PIC)	Admiral; Civilian; Commander	Starfleet Command; SS Eleos XII USS Enterprise-E (FC, INS, NEM); USS Enterprise-D (S1,3-7, GEN); Starfleet Command (S2)	Head of Starfleet Medical (PIC S5); Civilian doctor associated with the humanitarian organization Mariposas (PIC S5, LOW S4); Chief medical officer (S1, 3–7, movies); Head of Starfleet Medical (S2)	Human
Jack Crusher	Ed Speleers	Season 3 (PIC); Season 2 (PRO)	Ensign; Civilian	USS Enterprise NCC-1701-G; SS Eleos XII	Special counselor to the captain Civilian associated with the humanitarian organization Mariposas	Human
Wesley Crusher	Wil Wheaton	Seasons 1–4,5,7 (TNG); Season 2 (PRO); Season 2 (PIC S2); Movies (NEM)	Civilian (PIC S2), (PRO S2); Lieutenant, JG (NEM); Cadet (S4-7); Ensign (S3-4); Ensign (acting) (S1-3); Civilian (S1)	USS Titan (NEM); Starfleet Academy (S4-7); USS Enterprise-D (S1-4)	Traveler (PIC S2) , (PRO S2); Engineering officer (NEM); Starfleet cadet (S4-7); Helmsman (S1-4)	Human
Hugh Culber	Wilson Cruz	Season 1–5(DSC)	Commander; Lt. Commander	USS Discovery	Doctor	Human
Jal Culluh	Anthony De Longis	Seasons 1–3 (VOY)	First Maje	Kazon-Nistrim	Leader of Kazon-Nistrim	Kazon
Elizabeth Cutler	Kellie Waymire	Season 1 (ENT)	Crewman	Enterprise NX-01	Entomologist	Human
Leonardo da Vinci	John Rhys-Davies	Seasons 3–4 (VOY)	None	USS Voyager Program	Holographic character	Hologram
Damar	Casey Biggs	Seasons 4–7 (DS9)	Legate (S7); Gul (S6-7); Glinn (S4-6)	Cardassia Prime; CMS Groumall (S4)	Leader of Cardassian Union (S7); Dominion leader (S6-7); Vigilante (S5); Cardassian officer (S4)	Cardassian
Daniels /Kovich	David Cronenberg	Seasons 3-5 (DSC); Seasons 1–4 (ENT)	Federation official Crewman	Federation Headquarters; Unknown	Scientist in cognitive science, with specialties in artificial sentience and intelligence Temporal agent	Mostly Human
Daniels /Kovich	Matt Winston	Seasons 3-5 (DSC); Seasons 1–4 (ENT)	Federation official Crewman	Federation Headquarters; Unknown	Scientist in cognitive science, with specialties in artificial sentience and intelligence Temporal agent	Mostly Human
Data	Brent Spiner	Seasons 1–7 (TNG); Movies (GEN, FC, INS, NEM); Season 1 (PIC)	Lt. Commander	USS Enterprise-E (FC, INS, NEM); USS Enterprise-D (S1-7, GEN)	Chief operations officer (TNG, GEN, FC, INS, NEM)	Android
Ezri Dax	Nicole de Boer	Season 7 (DS9)	Lieutenant, JG (S7); Ensign (S7)	Deep Space 9	Counselor	Trill
Jadzia Dax	Terry Farrell	Seasons 1–6 (DS9)	Lt. Commander (S4-6); Lieutenant (S1-3)	Deep Space 9	Chief science officer	Trill
Degra	Randy Oglesby	Season 3 (ENT)	Civilian	Xindi Council	Scientist	Xindi-Primate
Keyla Detmer	Emily Coutts	Seasons 1–3 (DSC)	Lieutenant (S1-2); Lieutenant, JG (S1)	USS Discovery (S1-2); USS Shenzhou (S1)	Helmsman	Human
The Doctor	Robert Picardo	Seasons 1–7 (VOY)	None	USS Voyager	Chief medical officer	Hologram
Dolim	Scott MacDonald	Season 3 (ENT)	Commander	Xindi Council	Council member	Xindi-Reptilian
Dukat	Marc Alaimo	Seasons 1–7 (DS9)	Gul	Cardassia Prime	Religious leader (S6-7); Leader of Cardassia (S5); Vigilante (S4-5); Freighter commander (S4); Cardassian officer (S1-4)	Cardassian
Michael Eddington	Kenneth Marshall	Seasons 3–5 (DS9)	Civilian (S4-5); Lt. Commander (S3-4)	Deep Space 9 (S3-4)	Maquis (S7); Security officer (S5-7)	Human
Elnor	Evan Evagora	Seasons 1-2 (PIC)	Cadet (S2); Qowat Milat (S1)	USS Excelsior (S2); Vashti resident (S1)	Starfleet cadet (S2); Qalankhkai to Picard (S1)	Romulan
Kova Rin Esmar	Jin Maley	Season 3 (PIC)	Ensign	USS Enterprise NCC-1701-G (PIC S3); USS Titan (NCC-80102-A) (PIC S3)	Communications officer	Haliian
Evek	Richard Poe	Season 7 (TNG); Season 2 (DS9); Season 1 (VOY)	Gul	CMS Vetar	Commanding officer	Cardassian
Female Changeling	Salome Jens	Seasons 3–4,6–7 (DS9)	None	Cardassia Prime	Leader of Dominion	Changeling
Vic Fontaine	James Darren	Seasons 6–7 (DS9)	None	Deep Space 9 Program	Holographic entertainer	Hologram
Maxwell Forrest	Vaughn Armstrong	Seasons 1–4 (ENT)	Vice Admiral	Starfleet Command	NX Project	Human
Alonzo Freeman	Phil LaMart	Seasons 1-4 (LOW)	Admiral	Starfleet Command	Flag officer	Human
Carol Freeman	Dawnn Lewis	Seasons 1-5 (LOW)	Captain	USS Cerritos	Commanding officer	Human
Elim Garak	Andrew Robinson	Seasons 1–7 (DS9)	Civilian	Deep Space 9 resident	Tailor	Cardassian
Garrison	Adam Roarke	"The Cage"	Chief petty officer	USS Enterprise	Communications officer	Human
Philippa Georgiou	Michelle Yeoh	Seasons 1-3 (DSC); Season 1 (S31)	Captain (S1)	NCIA-93 (S2); Section 31 (S1-3); USS Shenzhou (S1)	Intelligence operative (S1-3); Emperor, Mirror Universe (S1); Commanding officer (S1)	Human
Sonya Gomez	Lycia Naff	Season 2 (TNG); Season 2 (LOW)	Ensign	USS Enterprise-D	Engineering officer	Human
Gowron	Robert O'Reilly	Seasons 4–6 (TNG); Seasons 3–7 (DS9)	Chancellor	Klingon High Council	Chancellor of Klingon Empire	Klingon
Amanda Grayson	Jane Wyatt	Season 2 (TOS); Movies (TVH, TFF)	Civilian	Vulcan resident	Teacher	Human
Amanda Grayson	Majel Barrett	Seasons 1 (TAS)	Civilian	Vulcan resident	Teacher	Human
Amanda Grayson	Winona Ryder	ST09	Civilian	Vulcan resident	Teacher	Human
Amanda Grayson	Mia Kirshner	Season 1 (DSC); Season 2 (SNW)	Civilian	Vulcan resident	Teacher	Human
Guinan	Whoopi Goldberg	Seasons 2–6 (TNG); Movies (GEN, NEM); Season 2 (PIC)	Civilian	USS Enterprise-D	Bartender	El-Aurian
Gwyndala "Gwyn"	Ella Purnell	Seasons 1-2 (PRO)	Civilian	USS Protostar NX-76884	Captain (S2); Communications officer (S1)	Vau N'Akat
J. Hayes	Steven Culp	Season 3 (ENT)	Major	Enterprise NX-01	MACO officer	Human
Hemmer	Bruce Horak	Season 1 (SNW)	Lieutenant	Enterprise NCC-1701	Chief Engineer	Aenar
Erika Hernandez	Ada Maris	Season 4 (ENT)	Captain	Columbia NX-02	Commanding officer	Human
Hogan	Simon Billig	Seasons 2–3 (VOY)	Ensign (provisional)	USS Voyager	Engineering officer Maquis (previous)	Human
Mr. Homn	Carel Struycken	Seasons 1–5 (TNG)	Civilian	Betazed resident	Servant	Unknown
Hugh	Jonathan Del Arco	Seasons 5–7 (TNG); Season 1 (PIC)	None	Romulan reclamation site	Borg drone (TNG); Director of Romulan reclamation site (PIC)	Borg (TNG); Human/xB (PIC)
Icheb	Manu Intiraymi	Seasons 6–7 (VOY)	Civilian (VOY)	USS Voyager resident (VOY)	Astrometrics (VOY)	Borg (VOY S6); Brunali/xB (VOY S6-7, PIC)
Icheb	Casey King	Season 1 (PIC)	Lieutenant (PIC)	USS Coleman (PIC)	Command officer (PIC)	Borg (VOY S6); Brunali/xB (VOY S6-7, PIC)
Ilthuran/The Diviner	John Noble	Seasons 1-2 (PRO)	Civilian	Solum; Tars Lamora	Astronomer; Prison colony tyrant	Vau N’Akat
Ishka	Cecily Adams	Seasons 3, 5–7 (DS9)	Civilian	Ferenginar resident	Philanthropist	Ferengi
Ishka	Andrea Martin	Seasons 3, 5–7 (DS9)	Civilian	Ferenginar resident	Philanthropist	Ferengi
Kathryn Janeway	Kate Mulgrew	Seasons 1–7 (VOY); Movies (NEM); Seasons 1-2 (PRO)	Vice Admiral (NEM); Captain (VOY)	Starfleet Command (NEM); USS Dauntless (PRO); USS Voyager (VOY)	Starfleet Admiral (NEM); Commanding officer (VOY)	Human
Jannar	Rick Worthy	Season 3 (ENT)	Civilian	Xindi Council	Scientist	Xindi-Arboreal
Michael Jonas	Raphael Sbarge	Season 2 (VOY)	Crewman (provisional)	USS Voyager	Engineering officer Maquis (previous)	Human
Agnes Jurati	Alison Pill	Seasons 1-2 (PIC)	Civilian	Daystrom Institute	Cyberneticist	Human
K'Ehleyr	Suzie Plakson	Seasons 2, 4 (TNG)	Ambassador	Earth resident	Federation Ambassador	Klingon/Human
Kes	Jennifer Lien	Seasons 1–4, 6 (VOY)	Civilian	USS Voyager	Medic; Aeroponics	Ocampa
Harry Kim	Garrett Wang	Seasons 1–7 (VOY)	Ensign	USS Voyager	Chief operations officer	Human
Kira Nerys	Nana Visitor	Seasons 1–7 (DS9)	Colonel (S7); Commander (S7); Major (S1-6)	Deep Space 9	Commanding officer (S7); First officer (S1-7)	Bajoran
George Kirk	Chris Hemsworth	ST09	Captain	USS Kelvin (ST09)	Commanding officer	Human
George Samuel "Sam" Kirk Jr.	William Shatner	Season 1(TOS)(Operation -- Annihilate!); Seasons 1–3 (SNW)	Lieutenant, JG	Deneva, USS Enterprise	Xenoanthropologist, research biologist	Human
George Samuel "Sam" Kirk Jr.	Dan Jeannotte	Season 1(TOS)(Operation -- Annihilate!); Seasons 1–3 (SNW)	Lieutenant, JG	Deneva, USS Enterprise	Xenoanthropologist, research biologist	Human
James T. Kirk	William Shatner	Seasons 1–3 (TOS); Seasons 1–2 (TAS); Movies (TMP, WOK, SFS, TVH, TFF, TUC, GEN, ST09, STID, STB); Season 5 (DS9) Seasons 1-3 (SNW)	Captain (TOS, TAS, TFF, TUC, GEN, STID, STB); Rear Admiral (TMP, WOK, SFS, TVH); Cadet (ST09)Lieutenant (SNW)	USS Enterprise-A (TVH, TFF, TUC); USS Enterprise (TOS, TAS, TMP, WOK, SFS, ST09, STID, STB, SNW); USS Farragut (SNW)	Commanding officer (TOS, TAS, TMP, WOK, SFS, TVH, TFF, TUC, STID, STB); First officer (ST09, SNW)	Human
James T. Kirk	Chris Pine	Seasons 1–3 (TOS); Seasons 1–2 (TAS); Movies (TMP, WOK, SFS, TVH, TFF, TUC, GEN, ST09, STID, STB); Season 5 (DS9) Seasons 1-3 (SNW)	Captain (TOS, TAS, TFF, TUC, GEN, STID, STB); Rear Admiral (TMP, WOK, SFS, TVH); Cadet (ST09)Lieutenant (SNW)	USS Enterprise-A (TVH, TFF, TUC); USS Enterprise (TOS, TAS, TMP, WOK, SFS, ST09, STID, STB, SNW); USS Farragut (SNW)	Commanding officer (TOS, TAS, TMP, WOK, SFS, TVH, TFF, TUC, STID, STB); First officer (ST09, SNW)	Human
James T. Kirk	Paul Wesley	Seasons 1–3 (TOS); Seasons 1–2 (TAS); Movies (TMP, WOK, SFS, TVH, TFF, TUC, GEN, ST09, STID, STB); Season 5 (DS9) Seasons 1-3 (SNW)	Captain (TOS, TAS, TFF, TUC, GEN, STID, STB); Rear Admiral (TMP, WOK, SFS, TVH); Cadet (ST09)Lieutenant (SNW)	USS Enterprise-A (TVH, TFF, TUC); USS Enterprise (TOS, TAS, TMP, WOK, SFS, ST09, STID, STB, SNW); USS Farragut (SNW)	Commanding officer (TOS, TAS, TMP, WOK, SFS, TVH, TFF, TUC, STID, STB); First officer (ST09, SNW)	Human
Kol	Kenneth Mitchell	Season 1 (DSC)	General, Klingon Empire	Klingon High Council	Council Member	Klingon
Kor	John Colicos	Season 1 (TOS); Season 1 (TAS); Seasons 2, 4, 7 (DS9)	Dahar Master (DS9); Commander, Klingon Empire (TOS, TAS)	Klingon Defense Force (DS9); IKS Klothos (TOS, TAS)	Defence officer (DS9); Commanding officer (TOS, TAS)	Klingon
Kurn	Tony Todd	Seasons 3–5 (TNG); Season 4 (DS9)	Crewman, Bajoran Militia (DS9); Captain, Klingon Empire (TNG)	Deep Space 9 (DS9); IKS Hegh'ta (TNG)	Security officer (DS9); Commanding officer (TNG)	Klingon
Alandra La Forge	Mica Burton	Season 3 (PIC)	Ensign	Fleet Museum	Engineer	Human
Geordi La Forge	LeVar Burton	Seasons 1–7 (TNG); Movies (GEN, FC, INS, NEM); Season 5 (VOY); Season 3 (PIC)	Commodore (S3, PIC); Lt. Commander (S3-7, movies); Lieutenant (S2); Lieutenant, JG (S1)	Federation Fleet Museum (S3, PIC); USS Enterprise-E (FC, INS, NEM); USS Enterprise-D (S1-7, GEN)	Curator (S3, PIC); Chief engineer (S2-7, movies); Helmsman (S1)	Human
Sidney La Forge	Ashlei Sharpe Chestnut	Season 3 (PIC)	Lieutenant, JG; Ensign	Enterprise NCC-1701-G; USS Titan (NCC-80102-A)	Helmsman	Human
Laris	Orla Brady	Seasons 1-2 (PIC)	Civilian	Earth resident	Vineyard Manager	Romulan
Leeta	Chase Masterson	Seasons 3–7 (DS9)	Civilian	Deep Space 9 resident	Dabo Girl	Bajoran
Leland	Alan van Sprang	Season 2 (DSC)	Captain	NCIA-93; Section 31	Commanding officer Intelligence Operative	Human
Li Nalas	Richard Beymer	Season 2 (DS9)	Navarch	Deep Space 9	Liaison officer	Bajoran
Linus	David Benjamin Tomlinson	Seasons 2–3 (DSC)	Lieutenant, JG	USS Discovery	Science officer	Saurian
Gabriel Lorca	Jason Isaacs	Season 1 (DSC)	Captain	USS Discovery	Commanding officer	Human
Lore	Brent Spiner	Season 3 (PIC); Seasons 1, 4, 6–7 (TNG)	Civilian			Android
L'Rell	Mary Chieffo	Seasons 1–2 (DSC)	Chancellor	Klingon High Council	Chancellor of Klingon Empire	Klingon
Lursa	Barbara March	Seasons 4–5, 7 (TNG); Movies (GEN); Season 1 (DS9)	Captain, Klingon Empire	Bird of Prey	Commanding officer	Klingon
Ma’ah	Jon Curry	Seasons 2, 4-5 (LOW)	Captain; Helm officer	Bloodwine delivery ship IKF Che'Ta	Captain; Helm officer	Klingon
Maihar'du	Tiny Ron Taylor	Seasons 1–3, 5–7 (DS9)	Civilian	Ferenginar resident	Attendant to Grand Nagus	Hupyrian
Maj'el	Michaela Dietz	Season 2 (PRO)	Ensign	Command division officer, USS Prodigy; Starfleet Academy fourth year cadet, USS Voyager		Vulcan
Mallora	Tucker Smallwood	Season 3 (ENT)	Civilian	Xindi Council	Chairman	Xindi-Primate
Carol Marcus	Bibi Besch	Movies (WOK, SFS, STID)	Civilian (WOK, SFS); Lieutenant (STID)	Project Genesis (WOK, SFS); USS Enterprise (STID)	Biologist	Human
Carol Marcus	Alice Eve	Movies (WOK, SFS, STID)	Civilian (WOK, SFS); Lieutenant (STID)	Project Genesis (WOK, SFS); USS Enterprise (STID)	Biologist	Human
Beckett Mariner	Tawny Newsome	Seasons 1-5 (LOW) Season 2 (SNW) (Those Old Scientists)	Ensign (Seasons 1-3); Lieutenant, JG (Season 4)	USS Cerritos		Human
Martok	J. G. Hertzler	Seasons 4–7 (DS9)	Chancellor (S7); General, Klingon Empire (S4-7)	Deep Space 9 IKS Rotarran	Chancellor of Klingon Empire (S7); Commander of Klingon Forces (S4-7)	Klingon
Travis Mayweather	Anthony Montgomery	Seasons 1–4 (ENT)	Ensign	Enterprise NX-01	Helmsman	Human
Joseph M'Benga	Booker Bradshaw	Seasons 2-3 (TOS) Seasons 1–3 (SNW)	Commander	USS Enterprise	Doctor; Chief medical officer,	Human
Joseph M'Benga	Babs Olusanmokun	Seasons 2-3 (TOS) Seasons 1–3 (SNW)	Commander	USS Enterprise	Doctor; Chief medical officer,	Human
Rukiya M'Benga	Sage Arrindell	Season 1 (SNW)	Civilian	USS Enterprise	Civilian	Human
Rukiya M'Benga	Mukambe Simamba	Season 1 (SNW)	Civilian	USS Enterprise	Civilian	Human
Leonard McCoy	DeForest Kelley	Seasons 1–3 (TOS); Seasons 1–2 (TAS); Movies (TMP, WOK, SFS, TVH, TFF, TUC, ST09, STID, STB); Season 1 (TNG); Season 5 (DS9)	Admiral (TNG); Commander (TMP, WOK, SFS, TVH, TFF, TUC); Lt. Commander (TOS, TAS, ST09, STID, STB)	USS Enterprise-A (TVH, TFF, TUC); USS Enterprise (TOS, TAS, TMP, WOK, SFS, ST09, STID, STB)	Chief medical officer	Human
Leonard McCoy	Karl Urban	Seasons 1–3 (TOS); Seasons 1–2 (TAS); Movies (TMP, WOK, SFS, TVH, TFF, TUC, ST09, STID, STB); Season 1 (TNG); Season 5 (DS9)	Admiral (TNG); Commander (TMP, WOK, SFS, TVH, TFF, TUC); Lt. Commander (TOS, TAS, ST09, STID, STB)	USS Enterprise-A (TVH, TFF, TUC); USS Enterprise (TOS, TAS, TMP, WOK, SFS, ST09, STID, STB)	Chief medical officer	Human
Mezoti	Marley S. McClean	Seasons 6–7 (VOY)	Civilian	USS Voyager Passenger		Norcadian
Migleemo	Paul F. Tompkins	Seasons 1-4 (LOW)	Commander?	USS Cerritos	Ship's Counselor	Klowahkan
Mila	Julianna McCarthy	Seasons 3,7 (DS9)	Civilian	Cardassia resident	Housekeeper	Cardassian
Jenna Mitchell	Rong Fu	Seasons 1-3, (SNW)	Lieutenant	USS Enterprise	Operations officer	Human
Mora Pol	James Sloyan	Seasons 2,5 (DS9)	Civilian	Bajor resident	Scientist	Bajoran
Morn	Mark Allen Shepherd	Seasons 1–7 (DS9); Season 1 (VOY)	Civilian	Deep Space 9 resident	Courier	Lurian
Mot	Ken Thorley	Seasons 5–6 (TNG)	Civilian	USS Enterprise-D	Barber	Bolian
Harry Mudd	Roger C. Carmel	Seasons 1–2 (TOS); Season 1 (TAS); Season 1 (DSC); Season 1 (ST)	Civilian		Smuggler	Human
Harry Mudd	Rainn Wilson	Seasons 1–2 (TOS); Season 1 (TAS); Season 1 (DSC); Season 1 (ST)	Civilian		Smuggler	Human
Matthew Arliss Mura	Joseph Lee	Season 3 (PIC)	Lieutenant	USS Enterprise NCC-1701-G (PIC S3); USS Titan (NCC-80102-A) (PIC S3)	Tactical officer	Bajoran
Murf	Dee Bradley Baker	Season 1 (PRO)	Ensign (S2); Starfleet Academy cadet (S2); Civilian (S1)	USS Protostar NX-76884	Civilian/Security officer	Mellanoid slime worm
Raffi Musiker	Michelle Hurd	Seasons 1-3 (PIC)	Commander (S2); Civilian (S1)	Enterprise NCC-1701-G (S3); Starfleet Intelligence (S3); USS Excelsior (S2)	First officer Undercover intelligence agent Chief operations officer (S2)	Human
Narek	Harry Treadaway	Season 1 (PIC)	Zhat Vash Operative			Romulan
Naya	Victoria Sawal	Season 5 (DSC)	Lieutenant	USS Discovery NCC 1031-A (DSC S5)	Operations officer	Human
Alynna Nechayev	Natalia Nogulich	Seasons 6–7 (TNG); Seasons 2–3 (DS9)	Fleet Admiral	Starfleet Command	Admiral of Starfleet	Human
Neelix	Ethan Phillips	Seasons 1–7 (VOY)	Ambassador (S7); Civilian (S1-7)	Talaxian Asteroid Colony (S7); USS Voyager (S1-7)	Federation Ambassador (S7); Chef (S1-7)	Talaxian
Nhan	Rachael Ancheril	Seasons 2-3 (DSC)	Commander	USS Discovery (S2-3); USS Enterprise (S2)	Chief security officer	Barzan
Susan Nicoletti	Christine Delgado	Seasons 1–4,7 (VOY)	Lieutenant, JG	USS Voyager	Engineering officer	Human
Eva Nilsson	Sara Mitich	Seasons 2-4 (DSC)	Lieutenant	USS Voyager NCC 74656 (DSC S5); USS Discovery	Operations officer	Human
Nog	Aron Eisenberg	Seasons 1–7 (DS9)	Lieutenant, JG (S7); Ensign (S6-7); Cadet (S4-5); Civilian (S1-4)	Deep Space 9 Starfleet Academy (S4-5)	Operations officer (S6-7); Starfleet cadet (S4-5); Bar employee (S1-4); Student (S1-4)	Ferengi
Khan Noonien Singh	Ricardo Montalbán	Season 1 (TOS); Movies (WOK, STID) (SNW S2)) (Tomorrow and Tomorrow and Tomorrow)	Civilian	SS Botany Bay (TOS)	Superhuman	Human Augment
Khan Noonien Singh	Benedict Cumberbatch	Season 1 (TOS); Movies (WOK, STID) (SNW S2)) (Tomorrow and Tomorrow and Tomorrow)	Civilian	SS Botany Bay (TOS)	Superhuman	Human Augment
Khan Noonien Singh	Desmond Sivan (as a child)	Season 1 (TOS); Movies (WOK, STID) (SNW S2)) (Tomorrow and Tomorrow and Tomorrow)	Civilian	SS Botany Bay (TOS)	Superhuman	Human Augment
La'an Noonien-Singh	Christina Chong (primary); Ava Cheung (as a child)	Seasons 1-3 (SNW)	Lieutenant	USS Enterprise	Chief security officer	Human
Noum	Jason Alexander	Seasons 1-2 (PRO)	Lietenant	USS Voyager-A; USS Dauntless	Ship’s counselor Chief medical officer	Tellarite
Kashimuro Nozawa	John Tampoya	Seasons 1–4,7 (VOY)	Ensign	USS Voyager	Operations officer	Human
Keiko O'Brien	Rosalind Chao	Seasons 4–6 (TNG); Seasons 1–7 (DS9)	Civilian	Deep Space 9 (DS9); USS Enterprise-D (TNG)	Teacher/Botanist (DS9); Botanist (TNG)	Human
Miles O'Brien	Colm Meaney	Seasons 1–7 (TNG); Seasons 1–7 (DS9)	Chief petty officer	Starfleet Academy (DS9 S7); Deep Space 9 (DS9 S1-7); USS Enterprise-D (TNG S1-6)	Academy professor (DS9 S7); Chief of operations (DS9 S1-7); Transporter chief (TNG S2-6); Helmsman (TNG S1)	Human
Molly O'Brien	Hana Hatae	Seasons 1–7 (DS9)	Civilian	Deep Space 9 resident	Student	Human
Odo	René Auberjonois	Seasons 1–7 (DS9)	Constable (unofficial)	Deep Space 9	Chief of security	Changeling
Alyssa Ogawa	Patti Yasutake	Seasons 3–7 (TNG); Movies (GEN, FC)	Lieutenant, JG (S7, movies); Ensign (S3-7)	USS Enterprise-E (FC); USS Enterprise-D (S3-7, GEN)	Nurse	Human
Oh	Tamlyn Tomita	Season 1 (PIC)	Commodore	Starfleet Command	Head of Starfleet Security	Vulcan
Opaka Sulan	Camille Saviola	Seasons 1–2,4 (DS9)	Kai	Bajor resident	Bajoran religious leader (S1)	Bajoran
Erica Ortegas	Melissa Navia	Seasons 1-3 (SNW)	Lieutenant	USS Enterprise	Helm officer	Human
Humberto “Beto” Ortegas	Mynor Pelaez Lüken	Season 3 (SNW)	Civilian		Documentary filmmaker	Human
Joann Owosekun	Oyin Oladejo	Seasons 1–5 (DSC)	Lieutenant, JG	USS Discovery	Operations officer	Human
Owen Paris	Warren Munson; Richard Herd	Seasons 2,5–7 (VOY)	Admiral	Starfleet Command	Pathfinder Project	Human
Tom Paris	Robert Duncan McNeill	Seasons 1–7 (VOY) Season 1 (LOW)	Lieutenant (LOW S1); Lieutenant, JG (S1-7); Ensign (S5-6)	USS Voyager	Helmsman	Human
Pelia	Carol Kane	Seasons 2-3 (SNW)	Commander	USS Enterprise	Chief engineer	Lanthanite
Phlox	John Billingsley	Seasons 1–4 (ENT)	Civilian	Enterprise NX-01	Chief medical officer	Denobulan
Jean-Luc Picard	Patrick Stewart	Seasons 1–7 (TNG); Movies (GEN, FC, INS, NEM); Season 1 (DS9); Seasons 1-3 (PIC)	Admiral (PIC); Captain (TNG, movies)	Earth resident (PIC); USS Enterprise-E (FC, INS, NEM); USS Enterprise-D (TNG S1-7, GEN)	Commanding officer (TNG, movies)	Human
Renée Picard	Penelope Mitchell	Season 2 (PIC)	Civilian	Europa Mission	NASA Astronaut	Human
Christopher Pike	Jeffrey Hunter	"The Cage"; Season 1 (TOS)	Admiral (STID); Captain (TC, TOS, ST09, DSC)	Starfleet Command (STID); USS Enterprise (TC, ST09, DSC)	Starfleet Admiral (STID); Commanding officer (TC, ST09, DSC)	Human
Christopher Pike	Bruce Greenwood	ST09, STID	Admiral (STID); Captain (TC, TOS, ST09, DSC)	Starfleet Command (STID); USS Enterprise (TC, ST09, DSC)	Starfleet Admiral (STID); Commanding officer (TC, ST09, DSC)	Human
Christopher Pike	Anson Mount	Seasons 1-3 (SNW) Season 2 (DSC)	Admiral (STID); Captain (TC, TOS, ST09, DSC)	Starfleet Command (STID); USS Enterprise (TC, ST09, DSC)	Starfleet Admiral (STID); Commanding officer (TC, ST09, DSC)	Human
Jankom Pog	Jason Mantzoukas	Seasons 1-2 (PRO)	Ensign (S2); Starfleet Academy cadet (S2); Civilian (S1)	USS Protostar NX-76884	Engineer	Tellarite
Tracy Pollard	Raven Dauda	Seasons 1–5 (DSC)	Lieutenant, JG	USS Discovery	Medical officer	Human
Katherine Pulaski	Diana Muldaur	Season 2 (TNG)	Commander	USS Enterprise-D	Chief medical officer	Human
Q	John de Lancie	Seasons 1–4, 6–7 (TNG); Season 1 (DS9); Seasons 2–3, 7 (VOY); Season 1 (LOW); Season 2 (PIC)	None	Q Continuum resident	Q Continuum	Q
Quark	Armin Shimerman	Season 7 (TNG); Seasons 1–7 (DS9); Season 1 (VOY)	Civilian	Deep Space 9 resident	Bar Owner	Ferengi
Teresa Ramirez	Sol Rodriguez	(PIC S2)	Civilian	Earth resident	Medical doctor associated with the humanitarian organization Mariposas	Human
Ricardo Ramirez	Steve Gutierrez	(PIC S2)	Civilian	Earth resident	Student	Human
Janice Rand	Grace Lee Whitney	Season 1 (TOS); Movies (TMP, TVH, TUC); Season 3 (VOY)	Commander (TUC); Chief petty officer (TVH); Crewman (TMP); Yeoman (TOS)	USS Excelsior (TUC); Starfleet Command (TVH); USS Enterprise (TOS, TMP)	First officer (TUC); Starfleet Command officer (TVH); Transporter chief (TMP); Yeoman (TOS)	Human
Jack Ransom	Jerry O'Connell	Seasons 1-5 (LOW)	Commander	USS Cerritos	First officer	Human
Rayner	Callum Keith Rennie	Season 5 (DSC)	Commander; Captain	USS Discovery NCC-1031-A; USS Antares	First officer Commanding officer	Kellerun
Rebi	Cody Wetherill	Seasons 6–7 (VOY)	Civilian	USS Voyager Passenger		Wysanti/xB
Malcolm Reed	Dominic Keating	Seasons 1–4 (ENT)	Lieutenant	Enterprise NX-01	Tactical officer	Human
Dal R'El	Brett Gray	Seasons 1-2 (PRO)	Ensign (S2); Starfleet Academy cadet (S2); Civilian (S1)	USS Protostar NX-76884)	Acting first officer (S2); Captain (S1)	Augment (Artificially created hybrid of many species)
Jet Reno	Tig Notaro	Seasons 2-5 (DSC)	Lt. Commander	USS Discovery (S2-3); USS Hiawatha (S2)	Chief Engineer	Human
Gen Rhys	Patrick Kwok-Choon	Seasons 1-5 (DSC)	Lieutenant	USS Discovery	Tactical officer	Human
William Riker	Jonathan Frakes	Seasons 1–7 (TNG); Movies (GEN, FC, INS, NEM); Season 2 (VOY); Season 4 (ENT); Seasons 1,3 (PIC); Season 1 (LOW)	Captain pro tem (PIC S3); Captain (NEM, PIC, LOW); Commander (TNG S1-7, movies)	USS Titan (NCC-80102-A); USS Zheng He (PIC S1); USS Titan (NEM, LOW S1); USS Enterprise-E (FC, INS, NEM); USS Enterprise-D (TNG S1-7, GEN)	Commanding officer (NEM, PIC S1, LOW S1); First officer (TNG S1-7, movies)	Human
Laira Rillak	Chelah Horsdal	Seasons 4-5 (DSC)	Civilian	None	President of the United Federation of Planets	Human/Bajoran/Cardassian
Cristóbal "Chris" Rios	Santiago Cabrera	Seasons 1-2 (PIC)	Captain (S2); Civilian (S1)	USS Stargazer (S2); La Sirena (S1)	Commanding officer (S2); Civilian Starship Captain (S1)	Human
Narissa Rizzo	Peyton List	Season 1 (PIC)	Colonel		Zhat Vash Operative	Romulan
Ro Laren	Michelle Forbes	Seasons 5–7 (TNG); Season 3 (PIC)	Commander (PIC); Lieutenant (S7); Ensign (S5-6)	USS Enterprise-D	Starfleet Intelligence operative (PIC); Maquis (S7); Helmsman (S5-7)	Bajoran
Rok-Takh	Rylee Alazraqui	Seasons 1-2 (PRO)	Ensign (S2); Starfleet Academy cadet (S2); Civilian (S1)	USS Protostar NX-76884	Science officer	Brikar
Rom	Max Grodénchik	Seasons 1–7 (DS9)	Grand Nagus (S7); Crewman (S4-7); Civilian (S1-4)	Deep Space 9	Grand Nagus (S7); Maintenance Engineer (S4-7); Bar employee (1–4)	Ferengi
William Ross	Barry Jenner	Seasons 6–7 (DS9)	Vice Admiral	Deep Space 9	Military commander	Human
Michael Rostov	Joseph Will	Seasons 1–2 (ENT)	Crewman	Enterprise NX-01	Engineering officer	Human
Alexander Rozhenko	Jon Paul Steuer	Seasons 4–7 (TNG); Season 6 (DS9)	Crewman, Klingon Empire (DS9); Civilian (TNG)	IKS Rotarran (DS9)	Weapons officer (DS9)	Klingon/Human
Alexander Rozhenko	Brian Bonsall	Seasons 4–7 (TNG); Season 6 (DS9)	Crewman, Klingon Empire (DS9); Civilian (TNG)	IKS Rotarran (DS9)	Weapons officer (DS9)	Klingon/Human
Alexander Rozhenko	Marc Worden	Seasons 4–7 (TNG); Season 6 (DS9)	Crewman, Klingon Empire (DS9); Civilian (TNG)	IKS Rotarran (DS9)	Weapons officer (DS9)	Klingon/Human
Samanthan "Sam" Rutherford	Eugene Cordero	Seasons 1-5 (LOW)	Lieutenant, JG | Ensign	USS Cerritos	Science officer	Human, cybernetically enhanced
Saavik	Kirstie Alley	Movies (WOK, SFS, TVH)	Lieutenant, JG	USS Grissom (SFS, TVH); USS Enterprise (WOK)	Science officer (SFS, TVH); Navigator (WOK)	Vulcan/Romulan
Saavik	Robin Curtis	Movies (WOK, SFS, TVH)	Lieutenant, JG	USS Grissom (SFS, TVH); USS Enterprise (WOK)	Science officer (SFS, TVH); Navigator (WOK)	Vulcan/Romulan
Sarek	Mark Lenard	Season 2 (TOS); Seasons 1 (TAS); Movies (TMP, SFS, TVH, TUC, ST09); Seasons 3, 5 (TNG); Seasons 1–2 (DSC)	Ambassador	Vulcan resident	Federation Ambassador	Vulcan
Sarek	Ben Cross	Season 2 (TOS); Seasons 1 (TAS); Movies (TMP, SFS, TVH, TUC, ST09); Seasons 3, 5 (TNG); Seasons 1–2 (DSC)	Ambassador	Vulcan resident	Federation Ambassador	Vulcan
Sarek	James Frain	Season 2 (TOS); Seasons 1 (TAS); Movies (TMP, SFS, TVH, TUC, ST09); Seasons 3, 5 (TNG); Seasons 1–2 (DSC)	Ambassador	Vulcan resident	Federation Ambassador	Vulcan
Saru	Doug Jones	Seasons 1–5 (DSC); Season 1 (ST)	Commander; Captain; Federation Ambassador	Federation Headquarters (DSC S5) USS Discovery (S1-3); USS Shenzhou (S1)	Federation Ambassador (DSC S5); First officer (S4-5); Captain (S3); First officer (S1-2); Science officer (S1)	Kelpien
Hoshi Sato	Linda Park	Seasons 1–4 (ENT)	Ensign	Enterprise NX-01	Communications officer	Human
Montgomery Scott	James Doohan	Seasons 1–3 (TOS); Seasons 1–2 (TAS); Movies (TMP, WOK, SFS, TVH, TFF, TUC, GEN, ST09, STID, STB); Season 6 (TNG); Season 5 (DS9) Seasons 2-3 (SNW)	Captain (SFS, TVH, TFF, TUC, GEN, TNG); Commander (TMP, WOK); Lt. Commander (TOS, TAS, ST09, STID, STB); Lieutenant, Junior Grade (SNW S2)	USS Enterprise-A (TVH, TFF, TUC); USS Enterprise (TOS, TAS, TMP, WOK, SFS, ST09, STID, STB); USS Stardiver	Chief Engineer	Human
Montgomery Scott	Simon Pegg	Seasons 1–3 (TOS); Seasons 1–2 (TAS); Movies (TMP, WOK, SFS, TVH, TFF, TUC, GEN, ST09, STID, STB); Season 6 (TNG); Season 5 (DS9) Seasons 2-3 (SNW)	Captain (SFS, TVH, TFF, TUC, GEN, TNG); Commander (TMP, WOK); Lt. Commander (TOS, TAS, ST09, STID, STB); Lieutenant, Junior Grade (SNW S2)	USS Enterprise-A (TVH, TFF, TUC); USS Enterprise (TOS, TAS, TMP, WOK, SFS, ST09, STID, STB); USS Stardiver	Chief Engineer	Human
Montgomery Scott	Martin Quinn	Seasons 1–3 (TOS); Seasons 1–2 (TAS); Movies (TMP, WOK, SFS, TVH, TFF, TUC, GEN, ST09, STID, STB); Season 6 (TNG); Season 5 (DS9) Seasons 2-3 (SNW)	Captain (SFS, TVH, TFF, TUC, GEN, TNG); Commander (TMP, WOK); Lt. Commander (TOS, TAS, ST09, STID, STB); Lieutenant, Junior Grade (SNW S2)	USS Enterprise-A (TVH, TFF, TUC); USS Enterprise (TOS, TAS, TMP, WOK, SFS, ST09, STID, STB); USS Stardiver	Chief Engineer	Human
Sela	Denise Crosby	Seasons 4–5 (TNG)	Commander, Romulan Empire	Unknown	Romulan officer	Romulan/Human
Seska	Martha Hackett	Seasons 1–3,7 (VOY)	None (S1-3); Ensign (provisional) (S1)	Kazon-Nistrim (S1-3); USS Voyager (S1)	Kazon Affiliate (S1-3); Engineering officer (S1); Science officer (S1); Maquis Infiltrator (previous)	Cardassian
Seven of Nine	Jeri Ryan	Seasons 1-3 (PIC); Seasons 4–7 (VOY)	Captain (PIC S3) Commander (PIC S3); Civilian (PIC S1-2) (VOY S4-7)	Enterprise NCC-1701-G (PIC S3); USS Titan (NCC-80102-A) (PIC S3); La Sirena (PIC S2); USS Voyager (VOY S4-7)	Captain (PIC S3); First officer (PIC S3); Vigilante (PIC S1-2); Astrometrics (VOY S4-7)|	Human/xB
Shakaar Edon	Duncan Regehr	Seasons 3–5 (DS9)	First Minister	Bajor resident	First Minister of Bajor	Bajoran
Liam Shaw	Todd Stashwick	Season 3 (PIC)	Captain	USS Titan (NCC-80102-A) (PIC S3)	Commanding officer	Human
Shaxs	Fred Tatasciore	Seasons 1-4 (LOW)	Lieutenant	USS Cerritos	Chief security officer	Bajoran
Thy'lek Shran	Jeffrey Combs	Seasons 1–4 (ENT)	General	Kumari	Andorian Imperial Guard	Andorian
Jennifer Sh'reyan	Lauren Lapkus	Seasons 1-4 (LOW)	Ensign	USS Cerritos	Counselor	Andorian
Silik	John Fleck	Seasons 1–4 (ENT)	Senior official	Suliban Cabal	Terrorist	Suliban
Benjamin Sisko	Avery Brooks	Seasons 1–7 (DS9)	Captain (S3-7); Commander (S1-3)	Deep Space 9	Commanding officer	Human
Jake Sisko	Cirroc Lofton	Seasons 1–7 (DS9)	Civilian	Deep Space 9 resident	Journalist (S5-7); Student (S1-5)	Human
Jennifer Sisko	Felecia M. Bell	Seasons 1,3–4 (DS9)	Lieutenant (S1)	USS Saratoga (S1)	Starfleet officer (S1)	Human
Joseph Sisko	Brock Peters	Seasons 4,6–7 (DS9)	Civilian	Earth resident	Restaurant Owner	Human
Sarah Sisko	Deborah Lacey	Season 7 (DS9)	Civilian	Earth resident	Holophotographer	Human
Luther Sloan	William Sadler	Seasons 6–7 (DS9)	None	Section 31	Intelligence Operative	Human
Kore Soong	Isa Briones	Season 2 (PIC)	Civilian	Resident of Earth	Traveler	Human
Soval	Gary Graham	Seasons 1–4 (ENT)	Ambassador	Earth	Vulcan Ambassador to Earth	Vulcan
Spock	Leonard Nimoy	"The Cage"; Seasons 1–3 (TOS); Seasons 1–2 (TAS); Movies (TMP, WOK, SFS, TVH, TFF, TUC, ST09, STID, STB); Season 5 (TNG); Season 5 (DS9); Season 2 (DSC); Season 1 (SNW)	Ambassador (TNG, ST09, STID); Captain (WOK, SFS, TVH); Commander (TC, TOS, TAS, TMP, ST09, STID, STB, DSC)	New Vulcan resident (STID); USS Enterprise-A (TVH, TFF, TUC); USS Enterprise (TC, TOS, TAS, TMP, ST09, STID, STB, DSC); Instructor (ST09)	Federation Ambassador (TNG, ST09, STID); First officer (TC, TOS, TAS, movies); Science officer (TC, TOS, TAS, ST09, STID, STB, DSC)	Vulcan/Human
Spock	Zachary Quinto	"The Cage"; Seasons 1–3 (TOS); Seasons 1–2 (TAS); Movies (TMP, WOK, SFS, TVH, TFF, TUC, ST09, STID, STB); Season 5 (TNG); Season 5 (DS9); Season 2 (DSC); Season 1 (SNW)	Ambassador (TNG, ST09, STID); Captain (WOK, SFS, TVH); Commander (TC, TOS, TAS, TMP, ST09, STID, STB, DSC)	New Vulcan resident (STID); USS Enterprise-A (TVH, TFF, TUC); USS Enterprise (TC, TOS, TAS, TMP, ST09, STID, STB, DSC); Instructor (ST09)	Federation Ambassador (TNG, ST09, STID); First officer (TC, TOS, TAS, movies); Science officer (TC, TOS, TAS, ST09, STID, STB, DSC)	Vulcan/Human
Spock	Ethan Peck	"The Cage"; Seasons 1–3 (TOS); Seasons 1–2 (TAS); Movies (TMP, WOK, SFS, TVH, TFF, TUC, ST09, STID, STB); Season 5 (TNG); Season 5 (DS9); Season 2 (DSC); Season 1 (SNW)	Ambassador (TNG, ST09, STID); Captain (WOK, SFS, TVH); Commander (TC, TOS, TAS, TMP, ST09, STID, STB, DSC)	New Vulcan resident (STID); USS Enterprise-A (TVH, TFF, TUC); USS Enterprise (TC, TOS, TAS, TMP, ST09, STID, STB, DSC); Instructor (ST09)	Federation Ambassador (TNG, ST09, STID); First officer (TC, TOS, TAS, movies); Science officer (TC, TOS, TAS, ST09, STID, STB, DSC)	Vulcan/Human
Paul Stamets	Anthony Rapp	Season 1-5 (DSC)	Commander; Lt. Commander (S2); Lieutenant (S1)	USS Discovery	Science officer	Human
Lon Suder	Brad Dourif	Seasons 2–3 (VOY)	Crewman (provisional)	USS Voyager	Engineering officer Maquis (previous)	Betazoid
Hikaru Sulu	George Takei	Seasons 1–3 (TOS); Seasons 1–2 (TAS); Movies (TMP, WOK, SFS, TVH, TFF, TUC, ST09, STID, STB); Season 3 (VOY)	Captain (TUC); Commander (WOK, SFS, TVH, TFF); Lt. Commander (TMP); Lieutenant (TOS, TAS, ST09, STID, STB)	USS Excelsior (TUC); USS Enterprise-A (TVH, TFF, TUC); USS Enterprise (TOS, TAS, TMP, WOK, SFS, ST09, STID, STB)	Commanding officer (TUC); Helmsman (TOS, TAS, TMP, WOK, SFS, TVH, TFF, ST09, STID, STB)	Human
Hikaru Sulu	John Cho	Seasons 1–3 (TOS); Seasons 1–2 (TAS); Movies (TMP, WOK, SFS, TVH, TFF, TUC, ST09, STID, STB); Season 3 (VOY)	Captain (TUC); Commander (WOK, SFS, TVH, TFF); Lt. Commander (TMP); Lieutenant (TOS, TAS, ST09, STID, STB)	USS Excelsior (TUC); USS Enterprise-A (TVH, TFF, TUC); USS Enterprise (TOS, TAS, TMP, WOK, SFS, ST09, STID, STB)	Commanding officer (TUC); Helmsman (TOS, TAS, TMP, WOK, SFS, TVH, TFF, ST09, STID, STB)	Human
Enabran Tain	Paul Dooley	Seasons 2–3,5 (DS9)	None	Cardassia resident	Leader of Obsidian Order	Cardassian
Adira Tal	Blu del Barrio	Seasons 3-5 (DSC)	Ensign	USS Discovery (S3-5)	Science officer (DSC S3-5)	Human
Gray Tal	Ian Alexander	Seasons 3-5 (DSC)	Civilian	Trill (DSC S4-5); USS Discovery (S3-4)	Guardian (DSC S5) Civilian (DSC S3-4)	Trill
T'Ana	Gillian Vigman	Seasons 1-5 (LOW)	Commander	USS Cerritos	Chief medical officer	Caitian
D'Erika Tendi	Ariel Winter	Seasons 4-5 (LOW)	Civilian	Orion	Head of House Tendi	Orion
D'Vana Tendi	Noël Wells	Seasons 1-5 (LOW)	Lieutenant, JG | Ensign	USS Cerritos	Science officer	Orion
Sylvia Tilly	Mary Wiseman	Season 1–5 (DSC); Season 1 (ST)	Lieutenant, JG (S3-5); Ensign (S2); Cadet (S1)	Starfleet Academy (S4-5); USS Discovery (S1-4)	Instructor (S4-5); Acting first officer (S3); Engineering officer (S2); Starfleet cadet (S1)	Human
T'Lyn	Gabrielle Ruiz	Seasons 2-5 (LOW)	Lieutenant, JG	USS Cerritos; VCF Sh'vhal	Science officer	Vulcan
Tomalak	Andreas Katsulas	Seasons 3–4,7 (TNG)	Commander, Romulan Empire	IRW Terix	Commanding officer	Romulan
Tora Ziyal	Melanie Smith	Seasons 4–6 (DS9)	Civilian	Deep Space 9 resident	Artist	Bajoran/Cardassian
Tora Ziyal	Cyia Batten	Seasons 4–6 (DS9)	Civilian	Deep Space 9 resident	Artist	Bajoran/Cardassian
B'Elanna Torres	Roxann Dawson	Seasons 1–7 (VOY)	Lieutenant, JG (provisional)	USS Voyager	Chief Engineer (S1-7); Maquis (S1)	Klingon/Human
T'Pau	Celia Lovsky	Season 2 (TOS) (Amok Time) (ENT S4)	Civilian	None	Civilian	Vulcan
T'Pau	Kara Zediker	Season 2 (TOS) (Amok Time) (ENT S4)	Civilian	None	Civilian	Vulcan
T'Pol	Jolene Blalock	Seasons 1–4 (ENT)	Commander (S4); SubCommander (S1-4)	Enterprise NX-01	First officer Science officer	Vulcan
T'Pring	Arlene Martel	Season 2 (TOS) (Amok Time) (SNW S1-2)	Civilian	None	Civilian	Vulcan
T'Pring	Gia Sandhu	Season 2 (TOS) (Amok Time) (SNW S1-2)	Civilian	None	Civilian	Vulcan
The Traveler	Eric Menyuk	Seasons 1,4,7 (TNG)	Civilian	Tau Alpha C resident		Unknown
T'Rina	Tara Rosling	Seasons 3-5 (DSC)	Civilian	Ni'Var	President of Ni'Var	Vulcan
Deanna Troi	Marina Sirtis	Seasons 1–7 (TNG); Movies (GEN, FC, INS, NEM); Seasons 6–7 (VOY); Season 4 (ENT); Seasons 1,3 (PIC); Season 1 (LOW)	Commander (TNG S7, VOY, movies); Lt. Commander (TNG S1-7)	USS Titan (NEM); USS Enterprise-E (FC, INS, NEM); USS Enterprise-D (TNG S1-7, GEN)	Diplomatic officer (NEM); Counselor (TNG S1-7, movies)	Betazoid/Human
Lwaxana Troi	Majel Barrett	Seasons 1–5,7 (TNG); Seasons 1,3–4 (DS9)	Ambassador	Betazed resident	Federation Ambassador	Betazoid
Kestra Troi-Riker	Lulu Wilson	Season 1 (PIC S1) Nepenthe	Civilian	Nepenthe resident	Student	Human/Betazoid
Trip Tucker	Connor Trinneer	Seasons 1–4 (ENT)	Commander	Enterprise NX-01	Chief Engineer	Human
Tuvok	Tim Russ	Seasons 1–7 (VOY); Season 3 (LD) (Grounded); Season 3 (PIC)	Captain (PIC S3); Commander (LD S3); Lt. Commander (S4-7); Lieutenant (S1-4)	Starfleet Command (PIC S3); USS Voyager (VOY S1-7)	Chief of Security	Vulcan
Ash Tyler/Voq	Shazad Latif	Seasons 1–2 (DSC)	Lieutenant (S1)	USS Discovery	Chief security officer (S1)	Human/Klingon
T'Veen	Stephanie Czajkowski	Season 3 (PIC)	Lieutenant	USS Titan (NCC-80102-A) (PIC S3)	Science officer	Vulcan/Deltan
José Tyler	Peter Duryea	"The Cage"	Lieutenant	USS Enterprise	Helmsman	Human
Tysess	Daveed Diggs	Seasons 1-2 (PRO)	Commander	USS Voyager-A; USS Dauntless	Executive officer	Andorian
Nyota Uhura	Nichelle Nichols	Seasons 1–3 (TOS); Seasons 1–2 (TAS); Movies (TMP, WOK, SFS, TVH, TFF, TUC); Season 5 (DS9)	Commander (WOK, SFS, TVH, TFF, TUC); Lt. Commander (TMP); Lieutenant (TOS, TAS, ST09, STID, STB)	USS Enterprise-A (TVH, TFF, TUC); USS Enterprise (TOS, TAS, TMP, WOK, SFS, ST09, STID, STB)	Communications officer	Human
Nyota Uhura	Zoe Saldaña	ST09, STID, STB	Commander (WOK, SFS, TVH, TFF, TUC); Lt. Commander (TMP); Lieutenant (TOS, TAS, ST09, STID, STB)	USS Enterprise-A (TVH, TFF, TUC); USS Enterprise (TOS, TAS, TMP, WOK, SFS, ST09, STID, STB)	Communications officer	Human
Nyota Uhura	Celia Rose Gooding	SNW Seasons 1-3	Commander (WOK, SFS, TVH, TFF, TUC); Lt. Commander (TMP); Lieutenant (TOS, TAS, ST09, STID, STB)	USS Enterprise-A (TVH, TFF, TUC); USS Enterprise (TOS, TAS, TMP, WOK, SFS, ST09, STID, STB)	Communications officer	Human
Charles Vance	Oded Fehr	Seasons 3-5 (DSC)	Fleet Admiral (PIC S3-5)	Starfleet Command	Commander-in-chief of Starfleet (DSC S3-5)	Human
Vash	Jennifer Hetrick	Seasons 3–4 (TNG); Season 1 (DS9)	Civilian	Earth resident	Archeologist	Human
Vorik	Alexander Enberg	Seasons 3–5, 7 (VOY)	Ensign	USS Voyager	Engineering officer	Vulcan
Weyoun	Jeffrey Combs	Seasons 4–7 (DS9)	None	Cardassia Prime	Dominion Leader	Vorta
Naomi Wildman	Scarlett Pomers	Seasons 2–7 (VOY)	Civilian	USS Voyager resident	Captain's Assistant (unofficial)	Ktarian/Human
Samantha Wildman	Nancy Hower	Seasons 2–6 (VOY)	Ensign	USS Voyager	Science officer	Human
Winn Adami	Louise Fletcher	Seasons 1–3, 5–7 (DS9)	Kai (S3-7); Vedek (S1-2)	Bajor resident	Bajoran religious leader	Bajoran
Worf	Michael Dorn	Seasons 1–7 (TNG); Movies (GEN, FC, INS, NEM); Seasons 4–7 (DS9); Season 3 (PIC)	Lt. Commander (DS9, movies); Ambassador (DS9 S7); Lieutenant (TNG S3-7); Lieutenant, JG (TNG S1-2)	Starfleet Intelligence (PIC S3); USS Enterprise-E (NEM); Qo'noS (DS9 S7); Deep Space 9 (DS9 S4-7); USS Enterprise-D (S1-7, GEN)	Intelligence operative (PIC S3); Strategic operations officer (DS9 S4-7, movies); Ambassador (DS9 S7); Chief security officer (TNG S2-7); Helmsman (TNG S1)	Klingon
Tasha Yar	Denise Crosby	Seasons 1,3,7 (TNG)	Lieutenant	USS Enterprise-D	Chief security officer	Human
Kasidy Yates	Penny Johnson Jerald	Seasons 3–7 (DS9)	Captain	SS Xhosa; Deep Space 9 resident	Freighter Captain	Human
Zek	Wallace Shawn	Seasons 1–3,5–7 (DS9)	Grand Nagus	Ferenginar resident	Leader of Ferengi economics	Ferengi
Zero	Angus Imrie	Seasons 1-2 (PRO)	Ensign (S2); Starfleet Academy cadet (S2); Civilian (S1)	USS Protostar NX-76884	Science officer	Medusan
Zhaban	Jamie McShane	Season 1 (PIC)	Civilian	Earth resident	Butler	Romulan
Zora	Annabelle Wallis	Seasons 3-5 (DISC); Season 1 (ST)		USS Discovery	Specialist	Artificial intelligence

== Appearances ==
=== Star Trek: The Original Series ===
= Main cast (credited)
= Recurring cast (4+)
= Guest cast (1-3)

Actor	Character	Seasons				TAS		Films						Reboot		
Actor	Character	TC	1	2	3	1	2	I	II	III	IV	V	VI	ST	STID	STB
Main cast
Jeffrey Hunter	Christopher Pike	M	G (Note: Jeffrey Hunter only appeared in stock footage during the first season. In new material, Pike was played uncredited by Sean Kenney.)													
Bruce Greenwood	Christopher Pike													S	S	
Majel Barrett	Number One	M														
Majel Barrett	Christine Chapel		G	R	R	Main	Main	A			A					
Leonard Nimoy	Spock	Main	Main	Main	Main	Main	Main	Main	Main	Main	Main	Main	Main	S	A	
Zachary Quinto	Spock													Main	Main	Main
Laurel Goodwin	J. M. Colt	M														
John Hoyt	Phillip Boyce	M														
Peter Duryea	José Tyler	M														
William Shatner	James T. Kirk		Main	Main	Main	Main	Main	Main	Main	Main	Main	Main	Main			
Chris Pine	James T. Kirk													Main	Main	Main
DeForest Kelley	Leonard McCoy		R	Main	Main	Main	Main	Main	Main	Main	Main	Main	Main			
Karl Urban	Leonard McCoy													Main	Main	Main
James Doohan	Montgomery Scott		Recurring	Recurring	Recurring	Main	Main	Main	Main	Main	Main	Main	Main			
Simon Pegg	Montgomery Scott													Main	Main	Main
Nichelle Nichols	Nyota Uhura		Recurring	Recurring	Recurring	Main	Main	Main	Main	Main	Main	Main	Main			
Zoe Saldaña	Nyota Uhura													Main	Main	Main
George Takei	Hikaru Sulu		Recurring	Recurring	Recurring	Main	Main	Main	Main	Main	Main	Main	Main			
John Cho	Hikaru Sulu													Main	Main	Main
Walter Koenig	Pavel Chekov			R	R			Main	Main	Main	Main	Main	Main			
Anton Yelchin	Pavel Chekov													Main	Main	Main
Ricardo Montalbán	Khan Noonien Singh		G						M							
Benedict Cumberbatch	Khan Noonien Singh														M	
Recurring/Guest Cast
Grace Lee Whitney	Janice Rand		R					A			A		A			
John Winston	Kyle		Recurring	Recurring	Recurring	(Note: James Doohan voiced the character in the pilot of the animated series. The character continued to appear throughout the series but did not have any more lines.)			A							
Jim Goodwin	John Farrell		G													
Grant Woods	Kelowitz		G													
Michael Barrier	Vincent DeSalle		G	G												
William Blackburn	Hadley		Recurring	Recurring	Recurring											
Eddie Paskey	Lesley		Recurring	Recurring	Recurring											
David L. Ross	Galloway		R	R	G											
Roger Holloway	Roger Lemli			R	R											
Frank da Vinci	Brent		Recurring	Recurring	Recurring											
Bruce Hyde	Kevin Thomas Riley		G													
Ron Veto	Harrison		Recurring	Recurring	Recurring											
Mark Lenard	Sarek			G		G				S	S	A (Note: A young version of the character is played by Jonathan Simpson in Star Trek V: The Final Frontier.)	A			
Ben Cross	Sarek													S		
Jane Wyatt	Amanda Grayson			G		(Note: Majel Barrett voiced the character in the animated series.)					A	A				
Winona Ryder	Amanda Grayson													S		
Roger C. Carmel	Harry Mudd		G	G		G										
Kirstie Alley	Saavik								S							
Robin Curtis	Saavik									S	S					

=== Star Trek: The Next Generation ===
= Main cast (credited)
= Recurring cast (4+)
= Guest cast (1–3)

Actor	Character	Seasons							Films			
Actor	Character	1	2	3	4	5	6	7	GEN	FCT	INS	NEM
Main cast
Patrick Stewart	Jean-Luc Picard	Main	Main	Main	Main	Main	Main	Main	Main	Main	Main	Main
Jonathan Frakes	William Riker	Main	Main	Main	Main	Main	Main	Main	Main	Main	Main	Main
LeVar Burton	Geordi La Forge	Main	Main	Main	Main	Main	Main	Main	Main	Main	Main	Main
Denise Crosby	Tasha Yar	Main		Guest				Guest				
Michael Dorn	Worf	Main	Main	Main	Main	Main	Main	Main	Main	Main	Main	Main
Gates McFadden	Beverly Crusher	Main		Main	Main	Main	Main	Main	Main	Main	Main	Main
Marina Sirtis	Deanna Troi	Main	Main	Main	Main	Main	Main	Main	Main	Main	Main	Main
Brent Spiner	Data	Main	Main	Main	Main	Main	Main	Main	Main	Main	Main	Main
Wil Wheaton	Wesley Crusher	Main (Note: Wil Wheaton is in the main cast of the first nine episodes of Season 4, departing in "Final Mission".)	Main	Main	Main	Guest		Guest				Guest
Recurring cast
Majel Barrett	Lwaxana Troi	Guest	Guest	Guest	Guest	Guest		Guest				
John de Lancie	Q	Guest	Guest	Guest	Guest		Guest	Guest				
Colm Meaney	Miles O'Brien	Guest	Recurring	Recurring	Recurring	Recurring	Guest	Guest				
Eric Menyuk	The Traveler	Guest			Guest			Guest				
Carel Struycken	Mr. Homn	Guest	Guest	Guest	Guest	Guest						
Diana Muldaur	Katherine Pulaski		Recurring									
Whoopi Goldberg	Guinan		Recurring	Recurring	Recurring	Recurring	Recurring		Guest			Guest
Lycia Naff	Sonya Gomez		Guest									
Robert O'Reilly	Gowron				Guest	Guest	Guest					
Suzie Plakson	K'Ehleyr		Guest		Guest							
Andreas Katsulas	Tomalak			Guest	Guest			Guest				
Dwight Schultz	Reginald Barclay			Guest	Guest		Guest	Guest		Guest		
Tony Todd	Kurn			Guest	Guest	Guest						
Rosalind Chao	Keiko O'Brien				Recurring	Recurring	Guest					
Denise Crosby	Sela				Guest	Guest						
Barbara March	Lursa				Guest	Guest		Guest	Guest			
Gwynyth Walsh	B'Etor				Guest	Guest		Guest	Guest			
Patti Yasutake	Alyssa Ogawa				Recurring	Recurring	Recurring	Recurring	Guest	Guest		
Brian Bonsall	Alexander Rozhenko					Recurring	Guest	Guest				
Jonathan Del Arco	Hugh of Borg					Guest	Guest	Guest				
Michelle Forbes	Ro Laren					Recurring	Guest	Guest				
Ashley Judd	Robin Lefler					Guest						
Ken Thorley	Mot					Guest	Guest					
Natalia Nogulich	Alynna Nechayev						Guest	Guest				

=== Star Trek: Deep Space Nine ===
= Main cast (credited)
= Recurring cast (4+)
= Guest cast (1-3)

Actor	Character	Seasons						
Actor	Character	1	2	3	4	5	6	7
Main cast
Avery Brooks	Benjamin Sisko	Main	Main	Main	Main	Main	Main	Main
René Auberjonois	Odo	Main	Main	Main	Main	Main	Main	Main
Terry Farrell	Jadzia Dax	Main	Main	Main	Main	Main	Main	
Cirroc Lofton	Jake Sisko	Main	Main	Main	Main	Main	Main	Main
Colm Meaney	Miles O'Brien	Main	Main	Main	Main	Main	Main	Main
Armin Shimerman	Quark	Main	Main	Main	Main	Main	Main	Main
Alexander Siddig	Julian Bashir	Main	Main	Main	Main	Main	Main	Main
Nana Visitor	Kira Nerys	Main	Main	Main	Main	Main	Main	Main
Michael Dorn	Worf				Main	Main	Main	Main
Nicole de Boer	Ezri Dax							Main
Recurring cast
Marc Alaimo	Dukat	Guest	Recurring	Recurring	Recurring	Recurring	Recurring	Recurring
Rosalind Chao	Keiko O'Brien	Recurring	Recurring	Guest	Recurring	Recurring	Guest	Guest
Aron Eisenberg	Nog	Recurring	Recurring	Recurring	Recurring	Recurring	Recurring	Recurring
Max Grodénchik	Rom	Recurring	Recurring	Recurring	Recurring	Recurring	Recurring	Recurring
Hana Hatae	Molly O'Brien	Guest	Guest	Guest	Recurring	Guest	Guest	Guest
Andrew Robinson	Elim Garak	Guest	Recurring	Recurring	Recurring	Recurring	Recurring	Recurring
Mark Allen Shepherd	Morn	Recurring	Recurring	Recurring	Recurring	Recurring	Recurring	Recurring
Louise Fletcher	Winn Adami	Guest	Recurring	Guest		Guest	Guest	Recurring
Philip Anglim	Bareil Antos	Guest	Recurring	Guest			Guest	
Majel Barrett	Lwaxana Troi	Guest		Guest	Guest			
Felecia M. Bell	Jennifer Sisko	Guest		Guest	Guest			
Camille Saviola	Opaka Sulan	Guest	Guest		Guest			
Wallace Shawn	Zek	Guest	Guest	Guest		Guest	Guest	Guest
Tiny Ron Taylor	Maihar'du	Guest	Guest	Guest		Guest	Guest	Guest
John Colicos	Kor		Guest		Guest			Guest
Paul Dooley	Enabran Tain		Guest	Guest		Guest		
Julianna McCarthy	Mila			Guest				Guest
Natalia Nogulich	Alynna Nechayev		Guest	Guest				
James Sloyan	Mora Pol		Guest			Guest		
Jonathan Frakes	Thomas Riker			Guest				
Salome Jens	Female Changeling			Recurring	Guest		Recurring	Recurring
Penny Johnson Jerald	Kasidy Yates			Guest	Recurring	Guest	Guest	Recurring
Chase Masterson	Leeta			Guest	Guest	Recurring	Recurring	Recurring
Kenneth Marshall	Michael Eddington			Recurring	Recurring	Guest		
Robert O'Reilly	Gowron			Guest	Guest	Guest		Guest
Duncan Regehr	Shakaar Edon			Guest	Guest	Guest		
Jeffrey Combs	Brunt			Guest	Guest	Guest	Guest	Guest
Jeffrey Combs	Weyoun				Guest	Recurring	Recurring	Recurring
Casey Biggs	Damar				Guest	Guest	Recurring	Recurring
J. G. Hertzler	Martok				Guest	Recurring	Recurring	Recurring
Brock Peters	Joseph Sisko				Guest		Guest	Guest
Melanie Smith^{f}	Tora Ziyal				Guest	Recurring	Recurring	
Cecily Adams^{f}	Ishka			Guest		Guest	Guest	Guest
James Darren	Vic Fontaine						Guest	Recurring
Barry Jenner	William Ross						Recurring	Recurring
William Sadler	Luther Sloan						Guest	Guest
Marc Worden	Alexander Rozhenko						Guest	
Deborah Lacey	Sarah Sisko							Recurring
John Vickery	Rusot							Recurring

=== Star Trek: Voyager ===
= Main cast (credited)
= Recurring cast (4+)
= Guest cast (1-3)

Actor	Character	Seasons						
Actor	Character	1	2	3	4	5	6	7
Main cast
Kate Mulgrew	Kathryn Janeway	Main	Main	Main	Main	Main	Main	Main
Robert Beltran	Chakotay	Main	Main	Main	Main	Main	Main	Main
Roxann Dawson	B'Elanna Torres	Main	Main	Main	Main	Main	Main	Main
Robert Duncan McNeill	Tom Paris	Main	Main	Main	Main	Main	Main	Main
Jennifer Lien	Kes	Main (Note: Lien is still credited as "Also Starring" following the opening credits in episodes 4.01, 4.02 and 6.23, instead of in the opening credits.)	Main	Main	Main		Main	
Ethan Phillips	Neelix	Main	Main	Main	Main	Main	Main	Main
Robert Picardo	The Doctor	Main	Main	Main	Main	Main	Main	Main
Tim Russ	Tuvok	Main	Main	Main	Main	Main	Main	Main
Garrett Wang	Harry Kim	Main	Main	Main	Main	Main	Main	Main
Jeri Ryan	Seven of Nine				Main	Main	Main	Main
Recurring cast
Josh Clark	Joe Carey	Recurring				Guest	Guest	Guest
Anthony De Longis	Jal Culluh	Guest	Recurring	Guest				
Martha Hackett	Seska	Recurring	Recurring	Guest				Guest
Derek McGrath	Chell	Guest						Guest
Simon Billig	Hogan		Recurring	Guest				
John de Lancie	Q		Guest	Guest				Guest
Brad Dourif	Lon Suder		Guest	Guest				
Richard Herd (Note: The character was played by Warren Munson in Seasons 2 and 5.)	Owen Paris		Guest			Guest	Guest	Guest
Nancy Hower	Samantha Wildman		Recurring	Guest	Guest	Guest	Guest	
Scarlett Pomers (Note: The character was played by uncredited babies in Seasons 2 and 3 and by Brooke Stephens in season 4.)	Naomi Wildman		Guest	Guest	Guest	Recurring	Recurring	Guest
Raphael Sbarge	Michael Jonas		Recurring					
Dwight Schultz	Reginald Barclay		Guest				Guest	Recurring
Susan Patterson	Kaplan			Recurring				
Alexander Enberg	Vorik			Guest	Guest	Guest		Guest
John Rhys-Davies	Leonardo da Vinci			Guest	Guest			
Martin Rayner	Doctor Chaotica					Guest		Guest
Susanna Thompson (Note: In the series finale, the character was played by Alice Krige.)	Borg Queen					Guest	Guest	Guest
Manu Intiraymi	Icheb						Recurring	Recurring
Marley S. McClean	Mezoti						Recurring	Guest
Zoe McLellan	Tal Celes						Guest	
Marina Sirtis	Deanna Troi						Guest	Guest
Cody Wetherill	Rebi						Recurring	Guest
Kurt Wetherill	Azan						Recurring	Guest

=== Star Trek: Enterprise ===
= Main cast (credited)
= Recurring cast (4+)
= Guest cast (1-3)

Actor	Character	Season				Ref
Actor	Character	1	2	3	4	Ref
Main cast
Scott Bakula	Jonathan Archer	Main	Main	Main	Main	
Jolene Blalock	T'Pol	Main	Main	Main	Main	
John Billingsley	Phlox	Main	Main	Main	Main	
Dominic Keating	Malcolm Reed	Main	Main	Main	Main	
Anthony Montgomery	Travis Mayweather	Main	Main	Main	Main	
Linda Park	Hoshi Sato	Main	Main	Main	Main	
Connor Trinneer	Charles "Trip" Tucker III	Main	Main	Main	Main	
Recurring cast
Vaughn Armstrong	Maxwell Forrest	Recurring	Recurring		Recurring	
Jeffrey Combs	Thy'lek Shran	Guest	Guest	Guest	Recurring	
Jim Fitzpatrick	Marcus Williams	Guest	Guest		Guest	
John Fleck	Silik	Recurring	Guest		Guest	
Gary Graham	Soval	Guest	Recurring	Guest	Recurring	
James Horan	Humanoid figure (Note: The character was nicknamed "Future Guy" by the fans of the series.)	Recurring	Guest			
Kellie Waymire	Elizabeth Cutler	Recurring				
Joseph Will	Michael Rostov	Guest	Guest			
Matt Winston	Daniels	Guest	Guest	Recurring	Guest	
Daniel Riordan	Duras		Guest			
Nathan Anderson	N. Kemper			Guest		
Molly Brink	Talas			Guest	Guest	
Steven Culp	J. Hayes			Recurring		
Daniel Dae Kim	D. Chang			Recurring		
Ken Lally	Taylor			Guest		
Scott MacDonald	Dolim			Recurring		
Sean McGowan	F. Hawkins			Recurring		
Randy Oglesby	Degra			Recurring		
Tucker Smallwood	Xindi Primate Councillor			Recurring		
Rick Worthy	Jannar			Recurring		
Joanna Cassidy	T'Les				Recurring	
Ada Maris	Erika Hernandez				Recurring	
Derek Magyar	Kelby				Recurring	
Kara Zediker	T'Pau				Guest	
Eric Pierpoint	Harris				Recurring	
Michael Reilly Burke	Koss				Recurring	

=== Star Trek: Discovery ===
= Main cast (credited)
= Recurring cast (3+)
= Guest cast (1-2)

Actor	Character	Seasons				
Actor	Character	1	2	3	4	5
Main cast
Sonequa Martin-Green	Michael Burnham	Main	Main	Main	Main	Main
Doug Jones	Saru	Main	Main	Main	Main	Main (Note: credited in the main titles only in episodes in which they appear.)
Shazad Latif	Voq	Recurring (Note: Latif is credited as Javid Iqbal in his first three appearances as Voq.)				
Shazad Latif	Ash Tyler	Main	Main			
Anthony Rapp	Paul Stamets	Main	Main	Main	Main	Main
Mary Wiseman	Sylvia Tilly	Main	Main	Main	Main	Main
Jason Isaacs	Gabriel Lorca	Main				
Wilson Cruz	Hugh Culber	Recurring	Main	Main	Main	Main
Anson Mount	Christopher Pike		Main			
Rachael Ancheril	Nhan		Recurring	Main	Guest	Guest
David Ajala	Cleveland "Book" Booker			Main	Main	Main
Tig Notaro	Jett Reno		Recurring	Recurring	Main	Main
Blu del Barrio	Adira Tal			Recurring	Main	Main
Callum Keith Rennie	Rayner					Main
Recurring cast
Michelle Yeoh	Philippa Georgiou	Recurring (Note: Yeoh is credited as a special guest star in the main titles only in episodes in which she appears.)	Recurring	Recurring		
Emily Coutts	Keyla Detmer	Recurring	Recurring	Recurring	Recurring	Recurring
Oyin Oladejo	Joann Owosekun	Recurring	Recurring	Recurring	Recurring	Recurring
Patrick Kwok-Choon	Gen Rhys	Recurring	Recurring	Recurring	Recurring	Recurring
Ronnie Rowe Jr.	R.A. Bryce	Recurring	Recurring	Recurring	Recurring	Guest
Mary Chieffo	L'Rell	Recurring	Recurring			
James Frain	Sarek	Recurring	Recurring			
Jayne Brook	Katrina Cornwell	Recurring	Recurring			
Kenneth Mitchell	Kol	Recurring				
Kenneth Mitchell	Kol-sha		Guest			
Kenneth Mitchell	Tenavik		Guest			
Kenneth Mitchell	Aurellio			Guest		
Rainn Wilson	Harry Mudd	Guest				
Rekha Sharma	Ellen Landry	Recurring		Guest		
Sara Mitich	Airiam	Recurring				
Hannah Cheesman	Airiam		Recurring	Guest		Guest
Sara Mitich	Nilsson		Recurring	Recurring	Recurring	
Mia Kirshner	Amanda Grayson	Guest	Recurring			
Ethan Peck	Spock		Recurring	Archive		
Raven Dauda	Tracy Pollard	Guest	Recurring	Recurring	Recurring	Guest
David Benjamin Tomlinson	Linus		Recurring	Recurring	Recurring	Recurring
Rebecca Romijn	Number One		Recurring			
Alan van Sprang	Leland		Recurring			
Sonja Sohn	Gabrielle Burnham		Recurring	Guest	Guest	
Oded Fehr	Charles Vance			Recurring	Recurring	Recurring
Ian Alexander	Gray Tal			Recurring	Recurring	Guest
David Cronenberg	Kovich			Recurring	Recurring	Recurring
Annabelle Wallis (voice)	Zora			Recurring	Recurring	Recurring
Durban and Leeu	Grudge			Recurring	Recurring	Recurring
Vanessa Jackson	Audrey Willa			Recurring	Guest	
Noah Averbach-Katz	Ryn			Recurring		
Janet Kidder	Osyraa			Recurring		
Tara Rosling	T'Rina			Guest	Recurring	Recurring
Chelah Horsdal	Laira Rillak				Recurring	Guest
Orville Cummings	Christopher				Recurring	Recurring
Shawn Doyle	Ruon Tarka				Recurring	
Elias Toufexis	Cold	Guest				
Elias Toufexis	L'ak					Recurring
Eve Harlow	Moll					Recurring
Victoria Sawal	Naya					Recurring
Natalie Liconti	Gallo					Recurring
Christina Dixon	Asha					Recurring
Tony Nappo	Ruhn					Recurring
Dorian Grey	Arisar					Recurring

=== Star Trek: Picard ===
This section includes cast members who appeared in main or recurring roles:

- A green cell indicates the actor is a main cast member.
- A red cell indicates the actor is a recurring guest star.
- A blue cell indicates the actor is a guest star.
- A yellow cell indicates the actor made an uncredited cameo appearance.

Star Trek: Picard main cast
Actor	Character	Appearances		
Actor	Character	Season 1	Season 2	Season 3
Patrick Stewart	Jean-Luc Picard	Main	Main	Main
Alison Pill	Agnes Jurati (Note: Agnes Jurati merges with the Borg Queen to become a new character, also played by Alison Pill, in the second season.)	Main	Main	
Isa Briones	Dahj and Soji Asha (Note: Isa Briones portrays Dahj in the series premiere, her sister Soji for the rest of the first season as well as the second-season premiere, and their predecessor Sutra in the two-part season one finale.)	Main	Main	
Isa Briones	Kore Soong		Main	
Harry Treadaway	Narek	Main		
Michelle Hurd	Raffi Musiker	Main	Main	Main
Santiago Cabrera	Chris Rios	Main	Main	
Evan Evagora	Elnor	Main	Main	
Jeri Ryan	Seven of Nine	Recurring	Main	Main
Orla Brady	Laris	Recurring	Main	Guest
Orla Brady	Tallinn		Main	
Brent Spiner	Data (Note: Brent Spiner also plays Altan Inigo Soong in the first and third seasons, and Data's evil twin Lore in the third season.)	Recurring		Recurring
Brent Spiner	Adam Soong		Main	
Ed Speleers	Jack Crusher			Main

Star Trek: Picard recurring cast
Actor	Character	Appearances		
Actor	Character	Season 1	Season 2	Season 3
Jamie McShane	Zhaban	Recurring		
Sumalee Montano	Mom AI	Recurring		
Tamlyn Tomita	Oh	Recurring		
Peyton List	Narissa	Recurring		
Jonathan Del Arco	Hugh	Recurring		
Rebecca Wisocky	Ramdha	Recurring		
Jonathan Frakes	William Riker	Guest		Recurring
Marina Sirtis	Deanna Troi	Guest		Recurring
John de Lancie	Q		Recurring	Cameo
Madeline Wise	Yvette Picard		Recurring	
Annie Wersching	Borg Queen		Recurring	Guest (Note: A different version of the Borg Queen appears in the third season, voiced by Alice Krige.)
Sol Rodríguez	Teresa Ramirez		Recurring	
Ito Aghayere	Guinan		Recurring (Note: Whoopi Goldberg has a guest role in the second season as the older version of Guinan.)	
Penelope Mitchell	Renée Picard		Recurring	
Gates McFadden	Beverly Crusher			Recurring
Todd Stashwick	Liam Shaw			Recurring
Ashlei Sharpe Chestnut	Sidney La Forge			Recurring
Michael Dorn	Worf			Recurring
Amanda Plummer	Vadic			Recurring
LeVar Burton	Geordi La Forge			Recurring
Mica Burton	Alandra La Forge			Recurring

=== Star Trek: Lower Decks ===
= Main cast (credited main cast member)
= Recurring cast (3+ appearances in a season)
= Guest cast (1–2 appearances per season)

Actor	Character	Seasons				
Actor	Character	1	2	3	4	5
Main cast
Tawny Newsome	Beckett Mariner	Main	Main	Main	Main	Main
Jack Quaid	Brad Boimler	Main (Note: In the second-season episode "Kayshon, His Eyes Open", Brad Boimler is duplicated by a transporter malfunction while serving on the USS Titan, the original Boimler is tricked by the duplicate Boimler into returning to the Cerritos, and the duplicate Boimler takes on the new name William Boimler (after the Titan's captain, William Riker) and remains onboard the Titan, before faking his death to become an agent of Section 31.)	Main	Main	Main	Main
Jack Quaid	William Boimler		Main	Main		Main
Noël Wells	D'Vana Tendi	Main	Main	Main	Main	Main
Eugene Cordero	Sam Rutherford	Main (Note: In the third-season episode "Reflections", Samanthan "Sam" Rutherford's implant is revealed to have been altered to suppress his true personality and memories as "Red" Rutherford", an angry first-year recruit in Starfleet who had been working on a secret project with shadowy Starfleet higher-ups before being imprisoned within his own mind, all memories of their own mysterious activities erased.)	Main	Main	Main	Main
Eugene Cordero	Red Rutherford			Main		
Dawnn Lewis	Carol Freeman	Main	Main	Main	Main	Main
Jerry O'Connell	Jack Ransom	Main	Main	Main	Main	Main
Fred Tatasciore	Shaxs	Main	Main	Main	Main	Main
Gillian Vigman	T'Ana	Main	Main	Main	Main	Main
Gabrielle Ruiz	T'Lyn		Guest	Guest	Also starring	Also starring
Recurring cast
Paul Scheer	Andy Billups	Recurring	Recurring	Recurring	Recurring	Recurring
Jessica McKenna	Barnes	Recurring	Recurring	Recurring	Recurring	Recurring
Ben Rodgers	Steve Stevens	Recurring	Recurring	Guest		Guest
Lauren Lapkus	Jennifer Sh'reyan	Guest	Recurring	Recurring		Guest
Phil LaMarr	Alonzo Freeman	Guest	Recurring	Recurring	Guest	Guest
Carl Tart	Kayshon		Recurring	Recurring	Recurring	Recurring
Paul F. Tompkins	Gabers Migleemo	Guest	Guest	Recurring	Recurring	Guest
Carlos Alazraqui	Les Buenamigo			Recurring		
Georgia King	Petra Aberdeen			Recurring		
Special guests and legacy characters
Jonathan Frakes	William Riker	Special guest	Special guest			
John de Lancie	Q	Special guest				
Marina Sirtis	Deanna Troi	Special guest				
Robert Duncan McNeill	Tom Paris		Special guest			
Robert Duncan McNeill	Nick Locarno				Guest	
Jeffrey Combs	AGIMUS		Special guest	Special guest	Special guest	
Alice Krige	Borg Queen		Guest			
Lycia Naff	Sonya Gomez		Guest			
Armin Shimerman	Quark			Special guest		
Nana Visitor	Kira Nerys			Special guest		
George Takei	Hikaru Sulu			Special guest		
James Cromwell	Zefram Cochrane			Guest		
J.G. Hertzler	Martok			Guest		
Susan Gibney	Leah Brahms			Guest		
Max Grodénchik	Rom				Special guest	
Chase Masterson	Leeta				Special guest	
Wil Wheaton	Wesley Crusher				Special guest	
Shannon Fill	Sito Jaxa				Guest	
Brent Spiner	Data					Special Guest
Jolene Blalock (Note: Credited mononymously as "Jolene".)	T'Pol					Special Guest
Andrew J. Robinson	Elim Garak					Special Guest
Alexander Siddig	Julian Bashir					Special Guest
Garrett Wang	Harry Kim					Special Guest
Alfre Woodard	Lily Sloane					Special Guest

=== Star Trek: Prodigy ===
This section includes cast members who appeared in main or recurring roles:

- A green cell indicates the actor is a main cast member.
- A red cell indicates the actor is a recurring guest star.
- A blue cell indicates the actor is a guest star.

Star Trek: Prodigy main cast
Actor	Character	Appearances	
Actor	Character	Season 1	Season 2
Brett Gray	Dal R'El	Main	Main
Ella Purnell	Gwyn	Main	Main
Jason Mantzoukas	Jankom Pog	Main	Main
Angus Imrie	Zero	Main	Main
Rylee Alazraqui	Rok-Tahk	Main	Main
Dee Bradley Baker	Murf	Main	Main
Jimmi Simpson	Drednok	Main	Main
Jimmi Simpson	The Lorekeeper		Main
John Noble	Ilthuran / The Diviner	Main	Main
Kate Mulgrew	Kathryn Janeway	Main	Main
Robert Beltran	Chakotay	Recurring	Main
Robert Picardo	The Doctor		Main
Jameela Jamil	Asencia / The Vindicator	Recurring	Main
Wil Wheaton	Wesley Crusher		Main

Star Trek: Prodigy recurring cast
Actor	Character	Appearances	
Actor	Character	Season 1	Season 2
Bonnie Gordon	Ship computer	Recurring	Recurring
Jason Alexander	Noum	Recurring	Recurring
Daveed Diggs	Tysess	Recurring	Recurring
Billy Campbell	Thadiun Okona	Recurring	Guest
Ronny Cox	Edward Jellico	Recurring	Recurring
Sunkrish Bala	Zeph		Recurring
Michaela Dietz	Maj'el		Recurring
Michaela Dietz	Grom		Recurring
Susanne Blakeslee	Kathon		Recurring
John Pirkis	Borom		Recurring

=== Star Trek: Strange New Worlds ===
This section includes cast members who will appear or have appeared in main or recurring roles:

- A green cell indicates the actor is a main cast member.
- A red cell indicates the actor is a recurring guest star.
- A blue cell indicates the actor is a guest star.
- A yellow cell indicates the actor is a co-star.

Star Trek: Strange New Worlds main cast
Actor	Character	Appearances			
Actor	Character	Season 1	Season 2	Season 3	Season 4
Anson Mount	Christopher Pike	Main	Main	Main	Main
Ethan Peck	Spock	Main	Main	Main	Main
Jess Bush	Christine Chapel	Main	Main	Main	Main
Christina Chong	La'An Noonien-Singh	Main	Main	Main	Main
Celia Rose Gooding	Nyota Uhura	Main	Main	Main	Main
Melissa Navia	Erica Ortegas	Main	Main	Main	Main
Babs Olusanmokun	Joseph M'Benga	Main	Main	Main	Main
Bruce Horak	Hemmer	Main	Guest		
Rebecca Romijn	Una Chin-Riley / Number One	Main	Main	Main	Main
Martin Quinn	Montgomery "Scotty" Scott	Co-star (Note: Scotty has an off-screen cameo in the first-season finale voiced by Matthew Wolf.)	Guest	Main	Main

Star Trek: Strange New Worlds recurring cast
Actor	Character	Appearances			
Actor	Character	Season 1	Season 2	Season 3	Season 4
Adrian Holmes	Robert April	Recurring	Recurring	Guest	
Dan Jeannotte	George Samuel "Sam" Kirk	Recurring	Recurring	Recurring	Guest
Gia Sandhu	T'Pring	Recurring	Guest		Guest
Melanie Scrofano	Marie Batel	Recurring	Recurring	Recurring	
Paul Wesley	James T. Kirk	Guest	Recurring	Recurring	Recurring
Carol Kane	Pelia		Recurring	Recurring	Recurring
Cillian O'Sullivan	Roger Korby			Recurring	
Mynor Luken	Beto Ortegas			Recurring	
Chris Myers	Dana Gamble			Recurring	

== Shared cast ==
Star Trek has an ongoing tradition of actors returning to reprise their roles in other spin-off series. In some instances, actors have portrayed potential ancestors, descendants, or relatives of characters they originated. Characters have also been recast for later appearances.

Actor(s)	Character	The Original Series (1966–1969)	The Animated Series (1973–1974)	The Next Generation (1987–1994)	Deep Space Nine (1993–1999)	Voyager (1995–2001)	Enterprise (2001–2005)	Discovery (2017–2024)	Short Treks (Note: Star Trek: Short Treks is a series of short films which do not form a cohesive story. There is no main cast.) (2018–2020)	Picard (2020–2023)	Lower Decks (2020–2024)	Prodigy (2021–2024)	Strange New Worlds (2022–present)	Very Short Treks (Note: Star Trek: Very Short Treks is a series of short films which do not form a cohesive story. There is no main cast.) (2023)	Starfleet Academy (2023)
William Shatner	James T. Kirk	Main	Main		Archive footage (Note: Appeared in "Trials and Tribble-ations" via archive footage)		Archive audio (Note: Appeared in "These Are the Voyages..." via archive voice over)		Archive audio (Note: Appeared in "Ephraim and Dot" via animation and archive voice footage)						
Paul Wesley	James T. Kirk												Recurring		
Jeffrey Hunter	Christopher Pike	Main (Note: Jeffrey Hunter was billed as a starring cast member in pilot episode "The Cage". Appeared in "The Menagerie", Parts I and II, via archive footage.)						Archive footage (Note: Appeared in "If Memory Serves" via archive footage)							
Sean Kenney	Christopher Pike	Guest (Note: Sean Kenny appeared in "The Menagerie", Parts I and II.)													
Anson Mount	Christopher Pike							Main (Note: Anson Mount appeared in Season 2 of Star Trek: Discovery as a main cast member.)	Guest					Main	
Leonard Nimoy	Spock	Main	Main	Guest	Archive footage			Archive footage (Note: Appeared in "If Memory Serves" and "Unification III" via archive footage)				Archive audio			
Ethan Peck	Spock							Recurring	Guest				Main	Guest	
DeForest Kelley	Leonard McCoy	Main (Note: DeForest Kelley was billed as a co-star for the first season of the Original Series.)	Main	Guest	Archive footage										
James Doohan	Scotty	Co-star	Co-star	Guest	Archive footage							Archive audio			
Carlos Alazraqui	Scotty													Guest	
Martin Quinn	Scotty												Main		
Nichelle Nichols	Uhura	Co-star	Co-star		Archive footage							Archive audio			
Celia Rose Gooding	Uhura												Main	Guest	
George Takei	Hikaru Sulu	Co-star	Co-star			Guest			Archive audio		Guest			Guest	
Walter Koenig	Pavel Chekov	Co-star (Note: Walter Koenig was billed as a co-star in season 2 of the Original Series.)			Archive footage					Guest (Note: Koenig played Pavel Chekov's son on Picard.)					
Jess Bush	Christine Chapel												Main		
Majel Barrett	Christine Chapel	Co-star	Co-star												
Majel Barrett	Computer Voice	Recurring	Recurring	Recurring	Recurring	Recurring	Recurring			Archive audio					
Majel Barrett	Lwaxana Troi			Recurring	Recurring										
Majel Barrett	Una "Number One" Chin-Riley	Guest						Archive footage							
Rebecca Romijn	Una "Number One" Chin-Riley							Recurring	Guest				Main		
Grace Lee Whitney	Janice Rand	Recurring				Guest									
Roger C. Carmel	Harry Mudd	Recurring	Guest												
Rainn Wilson	Harry Mudd							Recurring	Guest						
Patrick Stewart	Jean-Luc Picard			Main	Guest		Archive audio		Archive footage (Note: Appeared in "Children of Mars" via archive footage from "Remembrance" (Picard))	Main					
Jonathan Frakes	William Riker			Main	Guest (Note: Frakes appeared on Deep Space Nine as Thomas Riker, a clone of William Riker created by a transporter accident.)	Guest	Guest			Recurring	Guest			Guest	
LeVar Burton	Geordi La Forge			Main		Guest				Recurring					
Michael Dorn	Worf			Main (Note: Michael Dorn joined the cast of Deep Space Nine in "The Way of the Warrior".)	Main					Recurring					
Gates McFadden	Beverly Crusher			Main (Note: Gates McFadden was replaced by Diana Muldaur as the ship's doctor for Season 2 of the Next Generation.)						Recurring		Guest		Guest	
Marina Sirtis	Deanna Troi			Main		Guest	Guest			Recurring	Guest				
Brent Spiner	Data			Main			Guest (Note: Brent Spiner made an uncredited voice cameo in "These Are the Voyages...".)			Recurring	Guest				
Brent Spiner	Arik Soong						Guest								
Brent Spiner	Altan Inigo Soong									Guest					
Brent Spiner	Adam Soong									Main					
Wil Wheaton	Wesley Crusher			Main (Note: Wil Wheaton left the cast of the Next Generation in "Final Mission". He appeared in "The Game", "The First Duty", "Parallels" and "Journey's End" as a guest.)						Guest	Guest	Main			
Diana Muldaur	Katherine Pulaski			Main (Note: For each of her Season 2 appearances, Diana Muldaur was billed Special Guest.)											
Diana Muldaur	Ann Mulhall	Guest													
Diana Muldaur	Miranda Jones	Guest													
John de Lancie	Q			Recurring	Guest	Recurring				Recurring	Guest		Guest (Note: De Lancie's character in Strange New Worlds was identified as Q by Akiva Goldsman in an interview.)		
Whoopi Goldberg	Guinan			Recurring						Guest					
Ito Aghayere	Guinan									Recurring					
Dwight Schultz	Reginald Barclay			Recurring		Recurring									
Jon Paul Steuer	Alexander Rozhenko			Guest											
Brian Bonsall	Alexander Rozhenko			Recurring											
James Sloyan	Alexander Rozhenko			Guest (Note: James Sloyan appeared as a future Alexander Rozhenko in "Firstborn".)											
Marc Worden	Alexander Rozhenko				Recurring										
Jonathan Del Arco	Hugh			Recurring						Recurring					
Michelle Forbes	Dara			Guest											
Michelle Forbes	Ro Laren			Recurring						Guest					
Alice Krige	Borg Queen					Guest				Guest	Guest				
Susanna Thompson	Borg Queen					Recurring									
Annie Wersching	Borg Queen									Recurring					
Avery Brooks	Benjamin Sisko				Main										Archive audio (Note: A recording of Avery Brooks's voice from his 2007 album Here, not a prior Star Trek recording, was used in Starfleet Academy with the actor's permission.)
René Auberjonois	Odo				Main							Archive audio			
Cirroc Lofton	Jake Sisko				Main										Guest
Colm Meaney	Miles O'Brien			Recurring	Main										
Armin Shimerman	Quark			Guest	Main	Guest					Guest			Guest	
Alexander Siddig (Note: Alexander Siddig was billed Siddig el Fadil from 1993 to 1995, and for his guest appearance on the Next Generation.)	Julian Bashir			Guest	Main						Guest				
Nana Visitor	Kira Nerys				Main						Guest				
Rosalind Chao	Keiko O'Brien			Recurring	Recurring										
Andrew Robinson	Elim Garak				Recurring						Guest				
Kate Mulgrew	Kathryn Janeway					Main						Main			
Robert Beltran	Chakotay					Main						Main			
Robert Duncan McNeill	Tom Paris					Main					Guest				
Ethan Phillips	Neelix					Main								Guest	
Robert Picardo	The Doctor				Guest (Note: Robert Picardo appeared as a different Emergency Medical Hologram, and as its creator Lewis Zimmerman, in "Doctor Bashir, I Presume?".)	Main						Main			Main
Tim Russ	Tuvok				Guest (Note: Tim Russ appeared in "Through the Looking Glass" as the Mirror Universe analogue of Tuvok.)	Main				Guest					
Jeri Ryan	Seven of Nine					Main (Note: Jeri Ryan joined the cast of Voyager in "Scorpion, Part II".)				Main					
Garrett Wang	Harry Kim					Main					Guest				
Manu Intiraymi	Icheb					Recurring									
Mark Bennington	Icheb					Guest									
Casey King	Icheb									Guest					
Jolene Blalock	T'Pol						Main				Guest				
Connor Trinneer	Trip Tucker						Main							Guest	
Sonequa Martin-Green	Michael Burnham							Main							
Kyrie Mcalpin	Michael Burnham								Guest						
Doug Jones	Saru							Main	Guest					Guest	
Mary Wiseman	Sylvia Tilly							Main	Guest						Guest
Mark Lenard	Sarek	Guest	Guest	Guest											
James Frain	Sarek							Recurring							
Jane Wyatt	Amanda Grayson	Guest													
Majel Barrett	Amanda Grayson		Guest												
Mia Kirshner	Amanda Grayson							Recurring					Guest		
Tawny Newsome	Beckett Mariner										Main		Guest		
Tawny Newsome	Illa Dax														Guest
Jack Quaid	Brad Boimler										Main		Guest		
Noël Wells	D'Vana Tendi										Main		Guest	Guest	
Eugene Cordero	Sam Rutherford										Main		Guest		
Jerry O'Connell	Jack Ransom										Main		Guest		
Angus Imrie	Zero											Main		Guest	
Booker Bradshaw	Joseph M'Benga	Recurring													
Babs Olusanmokun	Joseph M'Benga												Main		
Bruce Horak	Hemmer												Main	Guest	
Arlene Martel	T'Pring	Guest													
Gia Sandhu	T'Pring												Recurring	Guest	
Oded Fehr	Charles Vance							Recurring							Main
Tig Notaro	Jett Reno							Recurring							Main

== See also ==
- Additional Lists of Star Trek characters in alternate categorization schemes
- List of Star Trek episodes
