= Crewman =

Crewman (/kruː.mən/) is a generic term for a crew member serving in the operation of an aircraft, naval vessel, spacecraft, or train. The term may also refer to individuals serving in a military capacity on weapon system platforms, such as those operating a tank.

In some science fiction (most notably Star Trek), crewman is the lowest military rank on board a spacecraft, analogous to seaman in many real-world navies. (Note: See for example the bio on Crewman Kelly, from the Enterprise series. or Crewman Green from the original series)

The term "crewman" may also be used interchangeably with the non-gender specific form as "crewperson" or "crewmember".
