= List of Star Trek: Prodigy characters =

Star Trek: Prodigy is an American animated television series created by Kevin and Dan Hageman. It is the tenth Star Trek series and was released from 2021 to 2024 as part of executive producer Alex Kurtzman's expanded Star Trek Universe. Prodigy is the first Star Trek series to specifically target a younger audience, and the franchise's first solely 3D animated series. It follows a group of young aliens in the 24th century who find the abandoned starship Protostar and learn about Starfleet.

Brett Gray, Ella Purnell, Jason Mantzoukas, Angus Imrie, Rylee Alazraqui, and Dee Bradley Baker voice the young crew of the Protostar, with Jimmi Simpson, John Noble, Kate Mulgrew, Robert Beltran, Robert Picardo, Jameela Jamil, and Wil Wheaton also providing voices for the series.

This list includes the main cast of Prodigy, guest stars with recurring roles, and other noteworthy guests.

== Cast overview ==
This section includes cast members who appeared in main or recurring roles:

- A green cell indicates the actor is a main cast member.
- A red cell indicates the actor is a recurring guest star.
- A blue cell indicates the actor is a guest star.

Star Trek: Prodigy main cast
Actor	Character	Appearances	
Actor	Character	Season 1	Season 2
Brett Gray	Dal R'El	Main	Main
Ella Purnell	Gwyn	Main	Main
Jason Mantzoukas	Jankom Pog	Main	Main
Angus Imrie	Zero	Main	Main
Rylee Alazraqui	Rok-Tahk	Main	Main
Dee Bradley Baker	Murf	Main	Main
Jimmi Simpson	Drednok	Main	Main
Jimmi Simpson	The Lorekeeper		Main
John Noble	Ilthuran / The Diviner	Main	Main
Kate Mulgrew	Kathryn Janeway	Main	Main
Robert Beltran	Chakotay	Recurring	Main
Robert Picardo	The Doctor		Main
Jameela Jamil	Asencia / The Vindicator	Recurring	Main
Wil Wheaton	Wesley Crusher		Main

Star Trek: Prodigy recurring cast
Actor	Character	Appearances	
Actor	Character	Season 1	Season 2
Bonnie Gordon	Ship computer	Recurring	Recurring
Jason Alexander	Noum	Recurring	Recurring
Daveed Diggs	Tysess	Recurring	Recurring
Billy Campbell	Thadiun Okona	Recurring	Guest
Ronny Cox	Edward Jellico	Recurring	Recurring
Sunkrish Bala	Zeph		Recurring
Michaela Dietz	Maj'el		Recurring
Michaela Dietz	Grom		Recurring
Susanne Blakeslee	Kathon		Recurring
John Pirkis	Borom		Recurring

== Main characters ==
=== Dal R'El ===
Dal R'El (voiced by Brett Gray) is a 17-year-old "maverick" of unknown species who takes the role of captain on the USS Protostar. Dal later learns that he is an augmented human with DNA from multiple alien species. Reckless and snarky in the beginning, Dal learns about leadership and shows that he truly cares about his friends and crew mates abroad the Protostar. In Season 2, Dal wrestles with his gradually growing sense of self-doubt, partly due to seeing a vision of himself refusing to take on the mantle of captain at Wesley Crusher's Time Traveller home-base. He develops a mentor-apprentice relationship with Captain Chakotay, who advises him that being in command is being there when needed. Dal plays an important role in helping Gwyn defeating Ascencia, and was temporarily recruited as a Nova Squadron fighter pilot after one of the original squadron pilots was injured. By the end of season 2, having discovered the true meaning behind his vision and taking Chakotay's advice to heart, Dal appoints himself as first officer of the new Protostar-class ship, the USS Prodigy, giving Gwyn the role of captain instead.

=== Gwyn ===
Gwyndala (voiced by Ella Purnell) is a 17-year-old Vau N'Akat nicknamed "Gwyn" who dreamed of exploring the stars while growing up on her father's prison asteroid. A talented linguist, she has learned many alien languages. The daughter of the Diviner, Gwyn secretly wants her father's approval – only to discover that by doing what her father wishes her to do, she is letting innocent people be harmed by his tyranny. Gwyn only slowly gains the trust of the Protostar crew, but once it is established that she is no threat, she becomes a very reliable ally. A fierce fighter, she wields a Vau N'Akat heirloom – a shapeshifting metallic arm band that can transforms into any weapon such as a spear or a shield. In Season 2, Gwyn travels to Solum to prevent civil war. Her attempts to gain the trust of the Vau N'Akat elders are botched by Ascencia the Vindicator. However, Gwyn finds Illuran, the Diviner's younger self and is able to prove to him that she is his daughter from the future. The actions of Dal, Zero, Jankom and Maj'el saving Chakotay in the future, accidentally jeopardized her existence, trapping in a time paradox where she has to wear a temporal armband to stop her from fading from existence. In her state, Gwyn becomes a target to the Loom, inter-dimensional scavengers who feed on dying timelines. She receives messages from a mysterious stranger (assumed to be Chakotay, but later revealed to be Wesley Crusher) saying that she and the others "must stay together" and to "find him [Wesley/Chakotay] before they (the Loom) [does]". She, Dal, Zero, Jankom, Rok, Murf, and Maj'el are able to find a grizzled Captain Chakotay and the Protostar. Gwyn was instrumental in helping Chakotay regain his spirit and confidence. She is able to defeat Ascencia, save Solum from civil war, and save the timeline. At the end of season 2, Gwyn becomes the captain of the new Protostar-class ship, the USS Prodigy.

=== Jankom Pog ===
Jankom Pog (voiced by Jason Mantzoukas) is an argumentative, wisecracking 16-year-old Tellarite. Having been born before the Tellarites joined the Federation, he awoke on a long-range sleeper ship. He handles repair duties on the Protostar as the appointed chief engineer. Jankom Pog often refers to himself in the third person, which is revealed to be because while repairing problems on the sleeper ship, the AI constantly made Jankom identify himself when talking to it.

=== Zero ===
Zero (voiced by Angus Imrie) is a Medusan – a noncorporeal, genderless, energy-based lifeform – who wears a containment suit to stop others from going mad at the sight of them. A telepath, Zero is very open-minded, empathic and compassionate and extremely wary of accidentally harming others – especially after accidentally and temporarily taking away a part of Gwyn's memory at one point in the series. In season 2, Zero gains a corporeal body which allows them to feel sensations for the very first time. Zero's body eventually breaks down, forcing them to return to a containment suit. However, at the suggestion of The Doctor, Jankom perfects and upgrades Zero's design, incorporating sensory inputs so that Zero retains the ability to feel even in their containment suit.

=== Rok-Tahk ===
Rok-Tahk (voiced by Rylee Alazraqui) is a shy, 8-year-old Brikar. Despite being large and strong, she defies being typecast as the ship's security officer and instead develops an interest in science. A natural animal lover, she has an affinity for cute, furry creatures and has a bond with Murf. Rok later become the ship's science officer and her affinity for Murf causes a Starfleet Academy professor to suggest that she major in xenobiology. In season 2, Rok is assigned to the Cetacean Ops on board Voyager for her training. She is at first reluctant to participate in Dal's "cockamamie schemes", devoting her studies to join Starfleet over getting into trouble. However, she relents after realizing the severity of the situation involving Gwyn's existence. During her tenure in Cetacean Ops, Rok befriends the resident humpback whale Gillian, who helps decipher Murf's message. In the episode "A Tribble Called Quest", Rok accidentally creates a Tribble/Brikar hybrid, later called a Bribble, while trying to assist a Klingon scientist modify his genetic serum to reduce the Tribbles' reproduction rate. At first embarrassed and ashamed over her mistake, Rok warms up to the Bribble, especially after it protects her and the crew from the aggressive Tribbles. As a result, Rok adopts the Bribble as her pet.

=== Murf ===
Murf (voiced by Dee Bradley Baker) is an apparently indestructible Mellanoid slime worm with good timing and an appetite for ship parts. The character was initially added as a joke, with Dal arriving to find a "semi-sentient blob" had joined the crew, but the writers soon fell in love with the idea of having a "dog-type character" in the series that children would enjoy. In the second half of the first season, the writers gave Murf a character arc beyond "just eating things", with the character evolving to have a more humanoid form. Murf ends up becoming the ship's security officer, a role that he proves to be quite adept at due to his surprising strength. In season 2, Murf continues to study to be a security officer with his instructor commenting that he may not be understandable, but Murf is a shoo-in for the security track at the academy. Murf receives a message from what turns out to be Wesley Crusher directing the crew to meet with him. In order to decipher it, the crew finally figures out how to understand Murf: being descended from an aquatic species, Murf is best understood underwater and by other aquatic creatures. As a result, the Voyager-A's humpback whale Gillian is able to translate the message for Murf's friends and Wesley also appears to be able to understand Murf's seeming gibberish. Murf also begins to be able to speak simple phrases such as going "pew, pew, pew, pew, pew" while operating the Protostar's phasers in battle.

=== Drednok ===
Drednok (voiced by Jimmi Simpson) are the Diviner's and Asencia's deadly robotic enforcers. Co-showrunner Kevin Hageman said the robot was "very still, and silent, and soft-spoken", which contrasted with the more driven personality of the Diviner. Simpson described Drednok as a more verbose version of the character Maximilian from the film The Black Hole (1979).

A third Drednok, dubbed "System Killer," appears as the main antagonist of the video game Star Trek: Prodigy Supernova.

A friendly Drednok called the Lorekeeper appears in season 2 which also features a number of Drednoks as soldiers under Asencia's command.

==== The Diviner's Drednok ====
Appearing throughout the first half of the first season as the Diviner's enforcer and lieutenant, Drednok serves as the overseer of the Tars Lamora prison colony until the kids' escape in the Protostar. Drednok subsequently aids his master in the search for the stolen ship. After receiving the Protostar's coordinates from the Ferengi Nandi, the Diviner hacks into its vehicle replicator and creates a copy of Drednok who attempts to return the ship to his master while it's caught in a temporal anomaly. Gwyn manages to eject Drednok's copy into space, but the Diviner uses its head to send a message threatening the other slaves at Tars Lamora to get the crew to return. During a final confrontation on Tars Lamora, Drednok is overpowered by the freed slaves and decapitated.

==== Asencia's Drednok ====
A bronze-colored Drednok who serves as Asencia's enforcer. During her time on the USS Dauntless, Drednok is hidden as a piece of furniture in her quarters and he helps Asencia to escape after she successfully launches the living construct to destroy Starfleet. Drednok continues to serve Asencia throughout her rule on Solum, helping to enforce her tyranny. During the final battle, Drednok engages Murf in a fight, only to be decapitated and dropped into a pit of gathering energy.

==== The Lorekeeper ====
A white-colored Drednok who is described as being little more than a library with legs by Ilthuran. The Lorekeeper serves as the caretaker of the Arcanum, the Vau N'Akat's reliquary of history and knowledge, and the lorekeeper of the Vau N'Akat. Ilthuran takes Gwyn to the Lorekeeper for information on how to prove her legitimacy and get the leaders of Solum to listen to her, although Gwyn briefly mistakes the Lorekeeper for the Diviner's Drednok. When Gwyn returns to Solum with the Protostar crew, she finds the Lorekeeper hooked up to cables in her father's observatory and she activates him to find out who had been sending messages following Ilthuran's capture. The Lorekeeper reveals that it was Asencia who then interrupts before the crew can get anything more out of him. However, it turns out that the Lorekeeper meant the younger version of Asencia who was working with Ilthuran to overthrow her tyrannical future self.

=== The Diviner/Ilthuran ===
The Diviner (voiced by John Noble) is Gwyn's father and a ruthless tyrant who controls the asteroid Tars Lamora and searches for the Protostar. The character, and Noble's performance, were inspired by Ricardo Montalbán's Star Trek villain Khan Noonien Singh. The character initially just appears floating in a tank, which was inspired by the floating Guild Navigator creature from David Lynch's Dune (1984).

In season 2, a younger version of the character appears still going by his real name of Ilthuran.

==== The Diviner ====
Hailing from a future where his homeworld of Solum was destroyed in a civil war after first contact with the Federation, the Diviner traveled back in time to find the lost Protostar and the living construct weapon aboard, running the Tars Lamora prison colony for twenty years. Fearing that he was the last of his kind and would die before completing his mission, the Diviner had his loyal Drednok create his progeny Gwyn. However, when the ship was finally located in 2383, it was by Dal R'El and his friends and his friends who stole the Protostar, leading the Diviner on a chase for them. Forcing the crew to return to Tars Lamora, the Diviner finally revealed the truth of their mission to Gwyn, only to be driven insane by the sight of Zero's true form and locked in his own prison while the Diviner's former slaves were given his ship to find a new life.

The Diviner was eventually found and rescued by Vice Admiral Kathryn Janeway in her own search for the Protostar. Reunited with Asencia, another Vau N'Akat who was also known as the Vindicator, the Diviner regained his sanity and his memory and prepared to use the living construct to destroy the Federation, but in a moment of compassion, freed "Janeway" (in reality Dal who had switched bodies with her) as thanks for the kindness that he had been shown. During a final confrontation on the Protostar, the Diviner was killed by Asencia defending his daughter and asked Gwyn to save their homeworld with his last words.

In the second season, the Diviner briefly reappears when the Protostar crew visits the future, albeit from before the Diviner became the tyrannical ruler of Tars Lamora. After the launch of the Protostar into the past and the escape of Chakotay and his first officer Adreek-Hu, the Diviner leads the search for the other escaped prisoners and witnesses the Infinity travel through time.

==== Ilthuran ====
Ilthuran is the present day version of the Diviner. While attempting to fulfill her father's final request, Gwyn meets Ilthuran who proves to be a kind-hearted astronomer and nothing like the ruthless tyrant that he would become as the Diviner. As Ilthuran, he is shown to be fascinated with the idea of life on other worlds, an idea that is not widely embraced on Solum, and is very caring towards Gwyn, helping her to challenge Asencia. After Gwyn's failure and escape, Ilthuran organizes a rebellion against her tyrannical rule – one that Asencia's own younger self ends up joining – and contacts Voyager to warn them about Asencia's mysterious new temporal weaponry before being captured. Ilthuran is rescued by Gwyn and her friends and granted political asylum aboard Voyager where he urges his people to rise up against Asencia's tyranny, leading to a civil war. Ilthuran aids Gwyn in defeating Asencia and leads the Vau N'Akat in making peaceful first contact with the Federation. With the future having changed, Wesley Crusher suggests at one point that Ilthuran will end up leading his people into a better future.

=== Kathryn Janeway ===
Kathryn Janeway was the captain of the USS Voyager. Kate Mulgrew reprises her role from Voyager, primarily voicing the Protostar's Emergency Training Holographic Advisor in the first season. Mulgrew also voices the real Janeway, now a Starfleet Vice Admiral who commands the USS Dauntless in the first season and then the USS Voyager-A in the second season.

== Recurring characters ==
=== Ship computer ===
The USS Protostar's computer is voiced by Bonnie Gordon.

=== Chakotay ===
Chakotay (voiced by Robert Beltran) is the original captain of the Protostar. After Dal and his friends accidentally change history, Chakotay and his first officer, Adreek, are able to escape with their ship through the rift, sending them to a distant planet. After ten years of being marooned, Chakotay becomes a bitter, broken man – devastated by the deaths of his entire crew and the later death of Adreek, who went out into storm to collect anti-matter. Dal's disappearance during an ion storm prompts Chakotay to take the reins and trust the Protostar crew to find him. Discovering Adreek's sacrifice and successfully acquired antimatter gives Chakotay closure and he recognizes the cadets' efforts in helping him recover his spirit. Chakotay becomes somewhat of a mentor to Dal, inspiring the latter to become First Officer, allowing the more level-headed Gwyn to become captain.

=== Asencia ===
The Vindicator (voiced by Jameela Jamil) is a member of the Diviner's species masquerading as Starfleet ensign Asencia aboard the Dauntless. It is later revealed that Asencia is actually her real name, which she had discarded before traveling through time. Far more ruthless than the Diviner, Asencia attempts to destroy Starfleet using the living construct and goes so far as to kill the Diviner when he gets in her way. When that plan fails, Asencia travels to her homeworld of Solum to poison the minds of the other Vau N'Akat against the Federation, eventually becoming a tyrannical dictator hellbent on destroying the Federation by any means necessary, capturing Wesley Crusher and extracting temporal technology from his mind. This ironically sparks the very civil war that Asencia and the Diviner had come back in time to prevent, although it isn't enough for the angry and bitter warlord to relent. In a final confrontation, Asencia is defeated by Gwyn when the other Vau N'Akat band together to lend Gwyn their strength. Her abilities seemingly burned out by the fight and having witnessed the consequences of her actions, Asencia expresses remorse for what she had done as Asencia is taken into custody for her crimes.

In the second season, a much younger version of Asencia appears, the Asencia from the present day. However, this Asencia is kind-hearted and horrified by the monster that her future self had become. The younger Asencia joins the rebellion against her future self and is the second person to lend Gwyn their strength in battle following Ilthuran, the present day version of the Diviner.

=== Noum ===
Noum (voiced by Jason Alexander) is a Tellarite medical officer on the Dauntless.

=== Tysess ===
Tysess (voiced by Daveed Diggs) is the Andorian first officer of the Dauntless and later of the USS Voyager-A.

=== Thadiun Okona ===
Thadiun Okona (voiced by Billy Campbell) is a rogue freighter captain who briefly becomes a "questionable guide" for the Protostar crew. An alternate reality version of Okona briefly appears in the second season. He previously appeared in the Star Trek: The Next Generation episode "The Outrageous Okona."

=== Edward Jellico ===
Edward Jellico (voiced by Ronny Cox) is a Starfleet admiral and Janeway's superior. He previously appeared in the Star Trek: The Next Generation episode "Chain of Command."

=== The Doctor ===
The Doctor (voiced by Robert Picardo) is an Emergency Medical Hologram from Voyager. The Doctor escorts the Protostar crew to the Voyager-A and assigns them to their training stations in the first episode of the second season. He becomes somewhat of a mentor to Zero, encouraging them to "grow beyond their capabilities". The Doctor also assists Janeway, Chakotay and Wesley Crusher in rescuing the Protostar crew from Ascencia and inadvertently serves as inspiration for the Protostar crew's plan to use holo-duplicates of themselves to fool Janeway and her crew. By this time, the Doctor has become an accomplished holo-novelist who has authored multiple books. The Doctor's experiences with the Protostar crew are shown to inspire the plot of another novel that he writes.

=== Maj'el ===
Maj'el (voiced by Michaela Dietz) is a Vulcan Starfleet cadet who was assigned in the Nova Squadron, an elite squad of Starfleet fighter pilots. She at first has an antagonist relationship with the Protostar crew, but quickly befriends Zero. After accidentally getting dragged along on the rescue mission to the future, Maj'el's relationship with the crew improves and Wesley Crusher discovers that she is the important seventh variable in their success. Maj'el later resigns from Nova Squadron to work with her new friends and joins them on the USS Prodigy. Maj'el is named after former recurring Star Trek cast member Majel Barrett.

=== Wesley Crusher ===
Wesley Crusher (voiced by Wil Wheaton) is an "omnitemporal Traveler" and former Starfleet officer who previously appeared in Star Trek: The Next Generation. Following the accidental creation of a temporal paradox, Wesley returns to help the Protostar crew fix the broken timeline and save the universe. Wesley allowed himself to be captured and tortured by Ascencia to give the kids an advantage to correct the timeline. However, the torture he endured from Ascencia damaged his time manipulation abilities – forcing him to re-adapt and revert to his natural-born Starfleet gifts. Wesley eventually regains his powers and visits his mother after Janeway tells him off for ignoring her, meeting his little brother Jack for the very first time in the process.

== Guest characters ==
- Odo (voiced by René Auberjonois) is a famous space station security officer and Changeling who appears as a hologram. Archival audio of Auberjonois from Star Trek: Deep Space Nine is used for the series.
- Montgomery Scott (voiced by James Doohan) is a famous Starfleet engineer who appears as a hologram. Archival audio of Doohan from Star Trek: The Original Series and Star Trek: The Next Generation is used for the series.
- Nyota Uhura (voiced by Nichelle Nichols) is a famous Starfleet communications officer who appears as a hologram. Archival audio of Nichols from The Original Series and Star Trek II: The Wrath of Khan (1982) is used for the series.
- Spock (voiced by Leonard Nimoy) is a famous Starfleet science officer who appears as a hologram. Archival audio of Nimoy from The Original Series, Star Trek: The Motion Picture (1979), The Wrath of Khan, and The Next Generation is used for the series.
- The captain of the Kobayashi Maru (voiced by David Ruprecht) appears as a hologram. Archival audio of Ruprecht from The Wrath of Khan is used for the series.
- Beverly Crusher (voiced by Gates McFadden) is a famous Starfleet medical officer who appears as a hologram in season 1, but later appears in person in season two.
- Nandi (voiced by Grey Griffin) is a female Ferengi smuggler who raised Dal.
- Barniss Frex (voiced by Eric Bauza) is a Starfleet lieutenant.
- Garrovick (voiced by Fred Tatasciore) is an ensign on the USS Enterprise during The Original Series
- Kaseth (voiced by Kimberly Brooks) is a Romulan commander.
- Dr. Jago (voiced by Amy Hill) is a geneticist.
- Dr. Erin Macdonald (voiced by Erin Macdonald) is a Starfleet scientist and instructor
- The Traveler (voiced by Eric Menyuk) is the mysterious space-time traveler who recruited Wesley Crusher to travel with him in The Next Generation. In "The Devourer of All Things, Part I," the Traveler and Wesley are arguing about Wesley's refusal to abandon the prime universe as the Protostar crew enters the time ziggurat.
