= List of Star Trek: Voyager episodes =

This is an episode list for the science fiction television series Star Trek: Voyager, which aired on UPN from January 1995 through May 2001. This is the fifth television program in the Star Trek franchise, and comprises a total of 168 (DVD and original broadcast) or 172 (syndicated) episodes over the show's seven seasons. (Note: Four episodes of Voyager ("Caretaker", "Dark Frontier", "Flesh and Blood" and "Endgame") each originally aired as two-hour presentations, and are considered whole episodes on the DVD release. Although "The Killing Game" aired as parts I and II back-to-back, they are treated as separate episodes on the DVD release.)

The episodes are listed here in chronological order by original air date, which match the episode order in each season's DVD set. This list also includes the fictional stardate on which the events of each episode took place.

== Series overview ==
Season	Episodes	Originally released	
Season	Episodes	First released	Last released
1	16	January 16, 1995	May 22, 1995
2	26	August 28, 1995	May 20, 1996
3	26	September 4, 1996	May 21, 1997
4	26	September 3, 1997	May 20, 1998
5	26	October 14, 1998	May 26, 1999
6	26	September 22, 1999	May 24, 2000
7	26	October 4, 2000	May 23, 2001

== Episodes ==
=== Season 1 (1995) ===
No. overall	No. in season	Title	Stardate	Directed by	Written by	Original release date	Prod. code	U.S. viewers (millions)
1	1	"Caretaker"	48315.6	Winrich Kolbe	Story by : Rick Berman; Story and teleplay by : Michael Piller and Jeri Taylor	January 16, 1995	40840-721 (101/102)	21.3
2	2	"Caretaker"	48315.6	Winrich Kolbe	Story by : Rick Berman; Story and teleplay by : Michael Piller and Jeri Taylor	January 16, 1995	40840-721 (101/102)	21.3
While searching for a missing Maquis ship with a Starfleet spy aboard, USS Voyager is swept away to the Delta Quadrant, more than 70,000 light-years from home, by an incredibly powerful being known as the "Caretaker".: Originally shown as a two-hour pilot movie on the UPN network, but in syndication is shown as two separate episodes.
3	3	"Parallax"	48439.7	Kim Friedman	Story by : Jim Trombetta; Teleplay by : Brannon Braga	January 23, 1995	40840-103	14.6
Voyager is trapped in a quantum singularity's event horizon, and Captain Janeway must decide between Lt. Carey and former Maquis B'Elanna Torres to be the new chief engineer.
4	4	"Time and Again"	48498.5 (Non-Canon)	Les Landau	Teleplay by : Michael Piller; Story and teleplay by : David Kemper	January 30, 1995	40840-104	13.9
Investigating a planet just devastated by a polaric explosion, Janeway and Paris are engulfed by a subspace fracture and transported in time to before the accident.
5	5	"Phage"	48532.4	Winrich Kolbe	Story by : Timothy DeHaas; Teleplay by : Skye Dent and Brannon Braga	February 6, 1995	40840-105	13.5
An organ-harvesting species known as the Vidiians steal Neelix's lungs, leaving him to die.
6	6	"The Cloud"	48546.2	David Livingston	Story by : Brannon Braga; Teleplay by : Tom Szollosi and Michael Piller	February 13, 1995	40840-106	11.2
The crew enter a nebula to collect samples before realizing it is a living organism, but not before injuring it.
7	7	"Eye of the Needle"	48579.4	Winrich Kolbe	Story by : Hilary J. Bader; Teleplay by : Bill Dial and Jeri Taylor	February 20, 1995	40840-107	11.7
The crew’s hopes are raised when a wormhole is detected as it may offer the chance of a return to the Alpha Quadrant. As her training as the Doctor’s new assistant continues, Kes is disturbed by the lack of respect that some crew members display towards him. The Romulan Captain is played by Vaughn Armstrong, who later appeared as Admiral Forrest in Star Trek: Enterprise.
8	8	"Ex Post Facto"	c. 48600.0 (Non-Canon)	LeVar Burton	Teleplay by : Michael Piller; Story and teleplay by : Evan Carlos Somers	February 27, 1995	40840-108	11.8
On a mission to the Banean home world, Tom Paris is found guilty of murder. Tuvok investigates and forms a hypothesis regarding what may have actually happened.
9	9	"Emanations"	48623.5	David Livingston	Brannon Braga	March 13, 1995	40840-109	10.3
After an Away Team stumbles upon a burial ground, Harry Kim is discovered to be missing, having been transferred to the culture's homeworld. The actor playing Vhnoran Dr. Neria, Jerry Hardin played Samuel Clemens (i.e. Mark Twain) in the Star Trek: The Next Generation double episode "Time’s Arrow".
10	10	"Prime Factors"	48642.5	Les Landau	Story by : David R. George III and Eric A. Stillwell; Teleplay by : Michael Perricone and Greg Elliot	March 20, 1995	40840-110	10.7
Voyager encounters aliens from the planet Sikaris, a highly advanced race. They have a device that could potentially send Voyager home, but the Sikarans have a law – similar to the Federation’s Prime Directive - that does not allow them to share such advanced technology.
11	11	"State of Flux"	48658.2	Robert Scheerer	Story by : Paul Robert Coyle; Teleplay by : Chris Abbott	April 10, 1995	40840-111	10.0
Janeway and the other senior officers attempt to flush out a spy who is sending information to the Kazon.
12	12	"Heroes and Demons"	48693.2	Les Landau	Naren Shankar	April 24, 1995	40840-112	10.0
The holographic doctor must rescue crew members who were turned to light energy in a Holodeck simulation of Beowulf.
13	13	"Cathexis"	48734.2	Kim Friedman	Story by : Joe Menosky; Story and teleplay by : Brannon Braga	May 1, 1995	40840-113	9.3
A shuttlecraft with Chakotay and Tuvok aboard is attacked; Chakotay is left brain-dead, while Tuvok begins acting strangely. An unknown force begins controlling crew members.
14	14	"Faces"	48784.2	Winrich Kolbe	Story by : Jonathan Glassner; Story and teleplay by : Kenneth Biller	May 8, 1995	40840-114	8.7
B'Elanna Torres is split into her human and Klingon halves by the Vidiians. This is one of the rare episodes of Voyager in which we get to see Roxann Biggs-Dawson without her familiar half-Human half- Klingon makeup.
15	15	"Jetrel"	48832.1, 48840.5	Kim Friedman	Story by : James Thomton and Scott Nimerfro; Teleplay by : Jack Klein, Karen Klein and Kenneth Biller	May 15, 1995	40840-115	8.2
A member of the Haakonians, a race warring with the Talaxians, arrives on Voyager, much to the dismay of Neelix, whose family was killed by a weapon of mass destruction this particular individual devised.
16	16	"Learning Curve"	48846.5	David Livingston	Ronald Wilkerson and Jean Louise Matthias	May 22, 1995	40840-116	8.3
Tuvok trains several Maquis members who have not fully integrated with the Voyager crew.

=== Season 2 (1995–96) ===
The last four episodes that were originally supposed to be part of season 1 (episodes 1, 3, 4, & 6, with stardates 48xxx) were moved to season 2. "The 37's" was originally filmed as season 1's finale.

No. overall	No. in season	Title	Stardate	Directed by	Written by	Original release date	Prod. code	U.S. viewers (millions)
17	1	"The 37's"	48975.1	James L. Conway	Jeri Taylor and Brannon Braga	August 28, 1995	40840-120	10.9
A group of humans from the 1930s are found in stasis on a seemingly abandoned planet, including the lost Amelia Earhart.
18	2	"Initiations"	49005.3	Winrich Kolbe	Kenneth Biller	September 4, 1995	40840-121	8.9
Chakotay encounters a Kazon youth who is on an initiation rite: to earn his name by killing an enemy or be killed in the attempt. Note: the "Kazon youth" is played by Aron Eisenberg, who plays Nog on DS9
19	3	"Projections"	48892.1	Jonathan Frakes	Brannon Braga	September 11, 1995	40840-117	8.4
The Doctor becomes delusional after an accident, causing him to believe that he is a flesh-and-blood person and his time on USS Voyager is a holodeck program. This episode also features Reginald Barclay.
20	4	"Elogium"	48921.3	Winrich Kolbe	Story by : Jimmy Diggs and Steve J. Kay; Teleplay by : Kenneth Biller and Jeri Taylor	September 18, 1995	40840-118	8.0
Space-dwelling life-forms cause Kes to enter the Ocampan fertile phase called Elogium, putting pressure on her relationship with Neelix when she wants to have his child.
21	5	"Non Sequitur"	49011	David Livingston	Brannon Braga	September 25, 1995	40840-122	8.3
Harry Kim wakes up in 24th century San Francisco with no record of him on Voyager.
22	6	"Twisted"	48945.8	Kim Friedman	Story by : Arnold Rudnick and Rich Hosek; Teleplay by : Kenneth Biller	October 2, 1995	40840-119	8.3
A region of space distorts the interior of Voyager.
23	7	"Parturition"	49068.5	Jonathan Frakes	Tom Szollosi	October 9, 1995	40840-123	8.4
Neelix and Tom Paris fight over Kes, but are sent on an away mission together.
24	8	"Persistence of Vision"	49037.2	James L. Conway	Jeri Taylor	October 30, 1995	40840-124	9.0
The crew experiences hallucinations brought on by an alien that put them into a trance-like state.
25	9	"Tattoo"	49211.5	Alexander Singer	Story by : Larry Brody; Teleplay by : Michael Piller	November 6, 1995	40840-125	8.6
Chakotay encounters non-humans who have the same tattoo on their foreheads that he has.
26	10	"Cold Fire"	49164.8	Cliff Bole	Story by : Anthony Williams; Teleplay by : Brannon Braga	November 13, 1995	40840-126	8.9
An Ocampan helps Kes with her mental abilities as the crew encounter a being who appears to be the Caretaker's female counterpart.
27	11	"Maneuvers"	49208.5	David Livingston	Kenneth Biller	November 20, 1995	40840-127	8.0
Kazon Nistrim board Voyager and steal a transporter module in an attempt to unite the Kazon sects.
28	12	"Resistance"	49234.1	Winrich Kolbe	Story by : Michael Jan Friedman and Kevin J. Ryan; Teleplay by : Lisa Klink	November 27, 1995	40840-128	8.7
A mission to acquire Telerium goes wrong causing Tuvok and B'Elanna to be captured and believed to be with the resistance.
29	13	"Prototype"	49270.9	Jonathan Frakes	Nicholas Corea	January 15, 1996	40840-129	8.4
The crew finds and reactivates a robot's body which was adrift in space only to find themselves in the middle of a war when B'Elanna is abducted.
30	14	"Alliances"	49337.4	Les Landau	Jeri Taylor	January 22, 1996	40840-131	7.9
Janeway attempts to form an alliance with the Kazon to improve Voyager's standing in the Delta Quadrant.
31	15	"Threshold"	49373.4	Alexander Singer	Story by : Michael De Luca; Teleplay by : Brannon Braga	January 29, 1996	40840-132	8.9
Tom Paris breaks the transwarp barrier in the Shuttlecraft Cochrane, designed to reach warp 10, but he begins to evolve.
32	16	"Meld"	49380.5	Cliff Bole	Story by : Mike Sussman; Teleplay by : Michael Piller	February 5, 1996	40840-133	7.3
Crewman Lon Suder murders an Engineering crewman for no apparent reason. Tuvok mind melds with him to ascertain his motive, but it causes Tuvok to become aggressive.
33	17	"Dreadnought"	49447.3	LeVar Burton	Gary Holland	February 12, 1996	40840-134	8.5
A highly advanced Cardassian AI missile that had been reprogrammed by B'Elanna Torres is found in the Delta Quadrant, and its damaged programming could destroy Voyager and a planet.
34	18	"Death Wish"	49401.2	James L. Conway	Story by : Shawn Piller; Teleplay by : Michael Piller	February 19, 1996	40840-130	9.8
The crew encounter a member of the Q Continuum seeking to end his immortal life.
35	19	"Lifesigns"	49504.3	Cliff Bole	Kenneth Biller	February 26, 1996	40840-136	8.1
The Doctor helps a Phage-ridden Vidiian woman.
36	20	"Investigations"	49507.2	Les Landau	Story by : Jeff Schnaufer and Ed Bond; Teleplay by : Jeri Taylor	March 13, 1996	40840-135	6.6
Neelix tries to flush out the traitor on board who has been colluding with the Kazon Nistrim.
37	21	"Deadlock"	49548.7	David Livingston	Brannon Braga	March 18, 1996	40840-137	8.5
Attempting to evade the Vidiians, a duplicate Voyager is created after it passes through a spatial scission.
38	22	"Innocence"	49578.2	James L. Conway	Story by : Anthony Williams; Teleplay by : Lisa Klink	April 8, 1996	40840-138	7.6
Tuvok crash-lands on a moon and finds children who have been abandoned.
39	23	"The Thaw"	49610.3	Marvin V. Rush	Story by : Richard Gadas; Teleplay by : Joe Menosky	April 29, 1996	40840-139	6.7
The crew finds aliens mentally connected to a computer that has created a being that feeds on their fear.
40	24	"Tuvix"	49655.2	Cliff Bole	Story by : Andrew Shepard Price and Mark Gaberman; Teleplay by : Kenneth Biller	May 6, 1996	40840-140	7.3
A transporter accident merges Tuvok and Neelix into a new person.
41	25	"Resolutions"	49690.1, 49694.2	Alexander Singer	Jeri Taylor	May 13, 1996	40840-141	6.7
Janeway and Chakotay must adapt to life quarantined on a planet after they contract an incurable disease. Meanwhile, the Voyager crew risk their lives to seek out a possible cure from the Vidiians.
42	26	"Basics, Part I"	50023.5	Winrich Kolbe	Michael Piller	May 20, 1996	40840-142	7.2
Seska and the Kazon-Nistrim take control of Voyager and maroon its crew on a desolate planet.

=== Season 3 (1996–97) ===
Four episodes from season 2 were moved to season 3 (specifically "Basics, Part II", "Flashback", "False Profits" and "Sacred Ground").

No. overall	No. in season	Title	Stardate	Directed by	Written by	Original release date	Prod. code	U.S. viewers (millions)
43	1	"Basics, Part II"	50032.7	Winrich Kolbe	Michael Piller	September 4, 1996	40840-146	8.3
The crew must learn to survive on the inhospitable planet as the Doctor, Crewman Suder and Paris attempt to regain control of the ship.
44	2	"Flashback"	50126.4	David Livingston	Brannon Braga	September 11, 1996	40840-145	7.7
Tuvok experiences brain-damaging flashbacks to his service on the USS Excelsior under Captain Hikaru Sulu. He and the captain attempt to find the reason for the flashbacks, believed to be a suppressed memory, through a joint mindmeld. Special guest stars: George Takei and Grace Lee Whitney.
45	3	"The Chute"	50156.2	Les Landau	Story by : Clayvon C. Harris; Teleplay by : Kenneth Biller	September 18, 1996	40840-147	6.1
Tom Paris and Harry Kim wrongfully accused, convicted and incarcerated in an unguarded Akritirian prison. Tom gets stabbed trying to protect Kim, leaving him to try to find an escape plan alone. Meanwhile, Voyager is trying to find a way to prove their innocence.
46	4	"The Swarm"	50252.3	Alexander Singer	Mike Sussman	September 25, 1996	40840-149	7.6
Voyager encounters a swarm of ships while trying to take a shortcut through a space belonging to a hostile species, while the Doctor begins to experience memory loss.
47	5	"False Profits"	50074.3	Cliff Bole	Story by : George Brozak; Teleplay by : Joe Menosky	October 2, 1996	40840-144	5.6
The crew encounters the Delta Quadrant terminus of the Barzan wormhole... and the two Ferengi from the Star Trek: The Next Generation episode "The Price" now posing as gods on a nearby planet.
48	6	"Remember"	50203.1, 50211.4	Winrich Kolbe	Story by : Brannon Braga and Joe Menosky; Teleplay by : Lisa Klink	October 9, 1996	40840-148	6.7
B'Elanna experiences vivid dreams. Which at first glance, transforms from a forbidden love affair to an increasingly dangerous path, leading to an alleged coverup concerning a planet-wide genocide.
49	7	"Sacred Ground"	50063.2	Robert Duncan McNeill	Story by : Geo Cameron; Teleplay by : Lisa Klink	October 30, 1996	40840-143	6.6
Kes is left comatose after contacting an energy field around a rock, forcing Janeway to embark on a spiritual quest to find a cure.
50	8	"Future's End"	50312.6	David Livingston	Brannon Braga and Joe Menosky	November 6, 1996	40840-150	8.0
51	9	"Future's End"	50312.6	Cliff Bole	Brannon Braga and Joe Menosky	November 13, 1996	40840-151	8.7
A 29th century timeship causes a time paradox when it accidentally sends itself and Voyager to two different periods in 20th century Earth. Janeway must prevent the destruction of the Solar System by a 20th-century entrepreneur who has acquired the timeship.
52	10	"Warlord"	50348.1, 50351.4, 50361.7	David Livingston	Story by : Andrew Shepard Price and Mark Gaberman; Teleplay by : Lisa Klink	November 20, 1996	40840-152	6.7
Kes is controlled by an alien warlord named Tieran.
53	11	"The Q and the Grey"	50384.2, 50392.7	Cliff Bole	Story by : Shawn Piller; Teleplay by : Kenneth Biller	November 27, 1996	40840-153	7.5
Q visits Voyager with a proposal for Janeway as civil war breaks out in the Q Continuum.
54	12	"Macrocosm"	50425.1	Alexander Singer	Brannon Braga	December 11, 1996	40840-154	6.8
Voyager answers a distress call from a mining colony about a viral outbreak that manages to sneak onto Voyager through the transporter, leaving only Janeway and the Doctor to stop it.
55	13	"Fair Trade"	50501.7	Jesús Salvador Treviño	Story by : Ronald Wilkerson and Jean Louise Matthias; Teleplay by : André Bormanis	January 8, 1997	40840-156	5.80
Voyager approaches the edge of Neelix's knowledge and a trading station.
56	14	"Alter Ego"	50460.3, 50471.3	Robert Picardo	Joe Menosky	January 15, 1997	40840-155	6.82
The crew enjoys a luau on the holodeck and Tuvok discovers an unusual hologram.
57	15	"Coda"	50518.6	Nancy Malone	Jeri Taylor	January 29, 1997	40840-158	6.51
Janeway appears to be trapped in a time-loop with different events, but all ending in her death.
58	16	"Blood Fever"	50537.2, 50541.6	Andrew Robinson	Lisa Klink	February 5, 1997	40840-157	6.43
Vulcan crewmember Vorik passes on the Pon farr to B'Elanna. Meanwhile, seemingly uninhabited planet Sakari is explored. After ruins are discovered, and a few survivors are found underground by the crew, it becomes obvious that local culture was destroyed by invaders. Remains of one of the invaders are found and identified - they were Borg.
59	17	"Unity"	50614.2, 50622.4	Robert Duncan McNeill	Kenneth Biller	February 12, 1997	40840-159	7.74
Chakotay answers a call for help on a planet and finds himself in the middle of a shoot-out between two groups of people. Meanwhile, the Voyager crew discovers an abandoned Borg ship.
60	18	"Darkling"	50693.2	Alexander Singer	Story by : Brannon Braga and Joe Menosky; Teleplay by : Joe Menosky	February 19, 1997	40840-161	6.37
The Doctor's attempt to graft other personalities into his program causes him to develop an evil alternate personality.
61	19	"Rise"	50654.9	Robert Scheerer	Story by : Jimmy Diggs; Teleplay by : Brannon Braga	February 26, 1997	40840-160	6.76
Voyager helps a planet with asteroid problems. Tuvok and Neelix crash-land on the planet and attempt to fix a maglev space elevator.
62	20	"Favorite Son"	50732.4	Marvin V. Rush	Lisa Klink	March 19, 1997	40840-162	6.17
Harry Kim is drawn to a planet that is nearly all women.
63	21	"Before and After"	50792.6 (probable), 55836.2 (temporal jump)	Allan Kroeker	Kenneth Biller	April 9, 1997	40840-163	6.46
Shortly before her death in the future, Kes begins to travel backwards in time, with a portion of events occurring in the "Year of Hell".
64	22	"Real Life"	50836.2	Anson Williams	Story by : Harry Kloor; Teleplay by : Jeri Taylor	April 23, 1997	40840-164	6.24
The Doctor creates a family on the holodeck.
65	23	"Distant Origin"	50903.7	David Livingston	Brannon Braga and Joe Menosky	April 30, 1997	40840-165	6.49
A reptilian scientist trying to prove his heretical theories kidnaps Chakotay and draws the entire crew in conflict between his race's doctrine and the startling truth about its origin.
66	24	"Displaced"	50912.4, 50929.6	Allan Kroeker	Lisa Klink	May 7, 1997	40840-166	6.67
Crew members are replaced one-by-one with aliens from an unknown race.
67	25	"Worst Case Scenario"	50953.4	Alexander Singer	Kenneth Biller	May 14, 1997	40840-167	6.10
B'Elanna Torres discovers a holodeck program where Chakotay and the Maquis rebel against Janeway.
68	26	"Scorpion, Part I"	50984.3, 51003.7	David Livingston	Brannon Braga and Joe Menosky	May 21, 1997	40840-168	7.86
Voyager must pass through Borg space, only to discover a new alien race that is even deadlier than the Borg.

=== Season 4 (1997–98) ===
No. overall	No. in season	Title	Stardate	Directed by	Written by	Original release date	Prod. code	U.S. viewers (millions)
69	1	"Scorpion, Part II"	51003.7	Winrich Kolbe	Brannon Braga & Joe Menosky	September 3, 1997	40840-169	10.28
Janeway and Tuvok work with the Borg and meet Seven of Nine as they collaborate on developing a weapon against Species 8472 in exchange for safe passage through Borg space.
70	2	"The Gift"	51008	Anson Williams	Joe Menosky	September 10, 1997	40840-170	8.19
Kes' mental abilities develop to a point where they endanger Voyager while The Doctor and Janeway slowly help Seven of Nine cope with being severed from the Borg.
71	3	"Day of Honor"	Unknown	Jesús Salvador Treviño	Jeri Taylor	September 17, 1997	40840-172	6.60
B'Elanna tries to observe the Klingon Day of Honor after the warp core is lost.
72	4	"Nemesis"	51082.4	Alexander Singer	Kenneth Biller	September 24, 1997	40840-171	6.45
Chakotay helps fight in an alien war.
73	5	"Revulsion"	51186.2	Kenneth Biller	Lisa Klink	October 1, 1997	40840-173	7.49
A hologram contacts Voyager and the Doctor is excited to meet another hologram.
74	6	"The Raven"	Unknown	LeVar Burton	Teleplay by : Bryan Fuller; Story by : Bryan Fuller & Harry Kloor	October 8, 1997	40840-174	6.96
Seven of Nine experiences Borg flashbacks as she attempts to become more human.
75	7	"Scientific Method"	51244.3	David Livingston	Teleplay by : Lisa Klink; Story by : Sherry Klein & Harry Kloor	October 29, 1997	40840-175	6.76
The crew have unexplained illnesses as they are closely observed by unseen intruders.
76	8	"Year of Hell"	51268.4	Allan Kroeker	Brannon Braga & Joe Menosky	November 5, 1997	40840-176	6.43
77	9	"Year of Hell"	51425.4	Mike Vejar	Brannon Braga & Joe Menosky	November 12, 1997	40840-177	8.06
Part 1: Voyager creates a new astrometrics lab, which maps a new course that brings them into contact with a Krenim temporal ship that can erase things from history. Part 2: A badly damaged Voyager hides in a nebula as a skeleton crew attempts repairs; meanwhile the Krenim commander proposes a compromise to Chakotay and Tom Paris.
78	10	"Random Thoughts"	51367.2	Alexander Singer	Kenneth Biller	November 19, 1997	40840-178	6.89
Torres is arrested while visiting a world of telepaths where violent thoughts are a crime.
79	11	"Concerning Flight"	51386.4	Jesús Salvador Treviño	Teleplay by : Joe Menosky; Story by : Jimmy Diggs & Joe Menosky	November 26, 1997	40840-179	6.38
Aliens steal several key components of Voyager, which are retrieved with assistance from a holographic Leonardo da Vinci.
80	12	"Mortal Coil"	51449.2	Allan Kroeker	Bryan Fuller	December 17, 1997	40840-180	5.11
Neelix dies in an attempt to sample proto-matter from a nebula. Seven of Nine helps resuscitate him using Borg nanoprobes, but Neelix, having no memory of an afterlife of any kind, experiences a spiritual crisis.
81	13	"Waking Moments"	51471.3	Alexander Singer	André Bormanis	January 14, 1998	40840-182	5.3
The crew becomes trapped in a shared nightmare generated by alien technology. Only Chakotay, through his Native American spiritual capabilities, can save them.
82	14	"Message in a Bottle"	51462	Nancy Malone	Story by : Rick Williams; Teleplay by : Lisa Klink	January 21, 1998	40840-181	5.85
The Doctor's program is sent to an advanced Starfleet vessel via a vast ancient communications network, but he soon discovers that only he and the ship's own EMH remain to fight against Romulans who have taken over the ship and are attempting to return to Romulan space with it.
83	15	"Hunters"	51501.4	David Livingston	Jeri Taylor	February 11, 1998	40840-183	5.32
Letters from home and Starfleet Command get held up at a Hirogen relay station and Janeway sets course to retrieve it.
84	16	"Prey"	51652.3	Allan Eastman	Brannon Braga	February 18, 1998	40840-184	5.47
Voyager rescues a Hirogen survivor who tells them a new kind of prey is on the loose.
85	17	"Retrospect"	51658.2	Jesús Salvador Treviño	Teleplay by : Bryan Fuller & Lisa Klink; Story by : Andrew Shepard Price & Mark Gaberman	February 25, 1998	40840-185	6.03
After experiencing unsettling hallucinations, Seven of Nine is hypnotized by the Doctor whose analysis reveals a trader might have extracted Borg technology from Seven without her consent.
86	18	"The Killing Game"	51715.2	David Livingston	Brannon Braga & Joe Menosky	March 4, 1998	40840-186	6.30
87	19	"The Killing Game"	51715.2	David Livingston	Brannon Braga & Joe Menosky	March 4, 1998	40840-187	6.30
The Hirogen implant devices into the crew making them believe they are characters within the holodecks being used for hunts, one of which is set in France during World War II.
88	20	"Vis à Vis"	51762.4	Jesús Salvador Treviño	Robert Doherty	April 8, 1998	40840-188	4.22
An alien shuttle with a prototype propulsion system suddenly appears and requires assistance. Paris is restless and volunteers to help the pilot, Steth, repair the shuttle.
89	21	"The Omega Directive"	51781.2	Victor Lobl	Teleplay by : Lisa Klink; Story by : Jimmy Diggs & Steve J. Kay	April 15, 1998	40840-189	5.27
Janeway undertakes the Omega Directive, an order to destroy Omega molecules, even if it means violating the Prime Directive.
90	22	"Unforgettable"	51813.4	Andrew Robinson	Greg Elliot & Michael Perricone	April 22, 1998	40840-190	4.67
An alien female from a cloaked ship asks for Chakotay by name and requests asylum on Voyager from her people.
91	23	"Living Witness"	Unknown	Tim Russ	Teleplay by : Bryan Fuller & Brannon Braga & Joe Menosky; Story by : Brannon Braga	April 29, 1998	40840-191	5.57
A Kyrian museum curator 700 years in the future hopes a Voyager relic containing a copy of the Doctor can confirm their version of history.
92	24	"Demon"	Unknown	Anson Williams	Story by : André Bormanis; Teleplay by : Kenneth Biller	May 6, 1998	40840-192	5.53
Tom Paris and Harry Kim take a shuttle down to an extremely inhospitable planet to obtain fuel.
93	25	"One"	51929.3	Kenneth Biller	Jeri Taylor	May 13, 1998	40840-193	5.40
Seven of Nine is left alone on Voyager when a nebula's deadly radiation forces the rest of the crew to stay in stasis and the Doctor's holographic program is disrupted.
94	26	"Hope and Fear"	51978.2	Winrich Kolbe	Teleplay by : Brannon Braga & Joe Menosky; Story by : Rick Berman & Brannon Braga & Joe Menosky	May 20, 1998	40840-194	6.18
Paris and Neelix return from a mission with a passenger named Arturis who knows more than 4,000 languages. He manages to decode a message from Starfleet that could lead to a way home.

=== Season 5 (1998–99) ===
No. overall	No. in season	Title	Stardate	Directed by	Written by	Original release date	Prod. code	U.S. viewers (millions)
95	1	"Night"	52081.2	David Livingston	Brannon Braga and Joe Menosky	October 14, 1998	40840-195	5.17
Voyager loses power traversing a dark region of space containing theta radiation.
96	2	"Drone"	52095.2	Les Landau	Story by : Bryan Fuller and Harry Kloor; Teleplay by : Bryan Fuller, Brannon Braga and Joe Menosky	October 21, 1998	40840-196	5.33
The Doctor's mobile emitter is damaged while beaming back from an away mission, merging with Seven of Nine's Borg nanoprobes and the DNA of a male Ensign to create a 29th century Borg.
97	3	"Extreme Risk"	52121.7	Cliff Bole	Kenneth Biller	October 28, 1998	40840-197	5.15
B'Elanna purposely puts herself into increasingly dangerous situations. Meanwhile, the crew decides to build a new shuttlecraft, the Delta Flyer.
98	4	"In the Flesh"	52136.4	David Livingston	Nick Sagan	November 4, 1998	40840-198	6.00
The ship encounters one of the training facilities of Species 8472, for an alien invasion of Starfleet and of Earth.
99	5	"Once Upon a Time"	52138.8	John Kretchmer	Michael Taylor	November 11, 1998	40840-199	5.44
Neelix looks after Naomi Wildman when her mother is injured on an away mission.
100	6	"Timeless"	52164.3	LeVar Burton	Story by : Rick Berman, Brannon Braga and Joe Menosky; Teleplay by : Brannon Braga and Joe Menosky	November 18, 1998	40840-201	6.42
Fifteen years in the future, Chakotay and Harry Kim attempt to prevent Voyager from crash-landing on an ice planet.
101	7	"Infinite Regress"	52188.7	David Livingston	Story by : Robert Doherty and Jimmy Diggs; Teleplay by : Robert Doherty	November 25, 1998	40840-203	4.9
When Voyager brings aboard an advanced piece of Borg technology from a salvaged Borg cube, Seven of Nine begins to take on the personalities of the people assimilated by the cube.
102	8	"Nothing Human"	52143.6	David Livingston	Jeri Taylor	December 2, 1998	40840-200	6.17
A wounded alien is brought on board from a stranded vessel and attaches itself to B'Elanna Torres.
103	9	"Thirty Days"	52179.4	Winrich Kolbe	Story by : Scott Miller; Teleplay by : Kenneth Biller	December 9, 1998	40840-202	6.00
Tom Paris disregards orders by helping an aquatic world and is demoted to Ensign.
104	10	"Counterpoint"	52261.3	Les Landau	Michael Taylor	December 16, 1998	40840-204	4.69
While passing through Devore space, Voyager is routinely searched for telepaths.
105	11	"Latent Image"	52489.3	Mike Vejar	Story by : Eileen Connors, Brannon Braga and Joe Menosky; Teleplay by : Joe Menosky	January 20, 1999	40840-206	5.36
The Doctor finds out that some of his memories have been blocked.
106	12	"Bride of Chaotica!"	52507.2	Allan Kroeker	Story by : Bryan Fuller; Teleplay by : Bryan Fuller and Michael Taylor	January 27, 1999	40840-207	5.74
Paris' latest holodeck adventure The Adventures of Captain Proton takes an unexpected turn.
107	13	"Gravity"	52438.9	Terry Windell	Story by : Jimmy Diggs, Bryan Fuller and Nick Sagan; Teleplay by : Nick Sagan and Bryan Fuller	February 3, 1999	40840-205	5.49
Tuvok and Paris crash on a planet stuck in a pocket of subspace, where they meet a female named Noss.
108	14	"Bliss"	52542.3	Cliff Bole	Story by : Bill Prady; Teleplay by : Robert Doherty	February 10, 1999	40840-209	5.61
A large organism telepathically deceives the Voyager crew into flying into its digestive chamber.
109	15	"Dark Frontier"	52619.2	Cliff Bole	Brannon Braga and Joe Menosky	February 17, 1999	40840-824 (211/212)	7.43
110	16	"Dark Frontier"	52619.2	Terry Windell	Brannon Braga and Joe Menosky	February 17, 1999	40840-824 (211/212)	7.43
Janeway plans to steal a transwarp coil from a disabled Borg ship to shorten their journey home. Seven of Nine experiences memories of her past just before she and her parents are assimilated and plans to re-join the Borg collective. The Borg Queen tells Seven of Nine that she will leave her individuality intact so the Borg can study her memories and use her to help them assimilate humanity.
111	17	"The Disease"	52563.9	David Livingston	Story by : Kenneth Biller; Teleplay by : Michael Taylor	February 24, 1999	40840-210	4.85
Kim finds love when the crew encounters a Varro generational ship that needs assistance repairing its warp drive.
112	18	"Course: Oblivion"	52586.3, 52597.4 (alternative timeline)	Anson Williams	Story by : Bryan Fuller and Nick Sagan; Teleplay by : Nick Sagan	March 3, 1999	40840-213	5.32
Lt. Torres and Ensign Paris get married; the crew discover they aren't who they think they are while trying to resolve why subspace radiation is causing them and Voyager to disintegrate. Reference to Season 4 episode "Demon".
113	19	"The Fight"	52531.1	Winrich Kolbe	Story by : Michael Taylor; Teleplay by : Joe Menosky	March 24, 1999	40840-208	4.05
Chakotay lies in sickbay as he attempts to communicate with aliens through hallucinations.
114	20	"Think Tank"	52623.7	Terrence O'Hara	Story by : Rick Berman and Brannon Braga; Teleplay by : Michael Taylor	March 31, 1999	40840-214	5.55
Voyager is being chased by the Hazari when a think tank offers assistance. (Guest stars Jason Alexander)
115	21	"Juggernaut"	52640.1	Allan Kroeker	Story by : Bryan Fuller; Teleplay by : Bryan Fuller, Nick Sagan and Kenneth Biller	April 26, 1999	40840-215	2.50
The crew responds to a distress call from Malon escape pods contaminated with radiation.
116	22	"Someone to Watch Over Me"	52647.1	Robert Duncan McNeill	Story by : Brannon Braga; Teleplay by : Michael Taylor	April 28, 1999	40840-216	4.78
Seven of Nine explores dating with some help from the Doctor.
117	23	"11:59"	52763.5 (April 22, 2375)	David Livingston	Story by : Brannon Braga and Joe Menosky; Teleplay by : Joe Menosky	May 5, 1999	40840-217	4.42
Janeway reminisces about one of her ancestors, Shannon O'Donnell from Indiana.
118	24	"Relativity"	52861.2	Allan Eastman	Story by : Nick Sagan; Teleplay by : Bryan Fuller, Nick Sagan and Michael Taylor	May 12, 1999	40840-218	4.76
Captain Braxton recruits Seven of Nine to stop Voyager being sabotaged.
119	25	"Warhead"	52947.6	John Kretchmer	Story by : Brannon Braga; Teleplay by : Michael Taylor and Kenneth Biller	May 19, 1999	40840-219	4.59
The crew rescues a device with artificial intelligence embedded in rock, that then proceeds to take control of The Doctor and reveals itself to be a weapon of mass destruction.
120	26	"Equinox, Part I"	52983.6, 53017.1	David Livingston	Story by : Rick Berman, Brannon Braga and Joe Menosky; Teleplay by : Brannon Braga and Joe Menosky	May 26, 1999	40840-220	4.80
Voyager finds another Federation ship, the USS Equinox, under attack from flying nucleogenic lifeforms.

=== Season 6 (1999–2000) ===
No. overall	No. in season	Title	Stardate	Directed by	Written by	Original release date	Prod. code	U.S. viewers (millions)
121	1	"Equinox: Part II"	52983.6, 53017.1	David Livingston	Teleplay by : Brannon Braga & Joe Menosky; Story by : Rick Berman & Brannon Braga and Joe Menosky	September 22, 1999	40840-221	6.16
The crew of the USS Equinox attempts to elude the USS Voyager in order to exploit the nucleogenic lifeforms in a bid to return home.
122	2	"Survival Instinct"	53049.2	Terry Windell	Ronald D. Moore	September 29, 1999	40840-222	5.82
Three Borg from Seven's past appear, and ask to be completely separated from the Collective.
123	3	"Barge of the Dead"	53082.5	Mike Vejar	Story by : Ronald D. Moore & Bryan Fuller; Teleplay by : Bryan Fuller	October 6, 1999	40840-223	5.25
B'Elanna's shuttle is hit by an ion storm and she awakens to find herself among Klingons in the Barge of the Dead, on the way to Klingon Hell.
124	4	"Tinker Tenor Doctor Spy"	53127.6	John Bruno	Story by : Bill Vallely; Teleplay by : Joe Menosky	October 13, 1999	40840-224	5.09
The Doctor adds daydreaming to his program, imagining himself as the Emergency Command Hologram (ECH) aboard Voyager; but aliens, tapping into his perceptions to observe the crew, prepare an attack when they believe that what they are seeing in the daydreams is real.
125	5	"Alice"	53225.7	David Livingston	Story by : Juliann deLayne; Teleplay by : Bryan Fuller & Michael Taylor	October 20, 1999	40840-226	4.53
Tom Paris becomes obsessed with a salvaged alien shuttlecraft, which appears to have a mind of its own.
126	6	"Riddles"	53263.2	Roxann Dawson	Story by : André Bormanis; Teleplay by : Robert Doherty	November 3, 1999	40840-227	4.79
Returning from a diplomatic mission, Tuvok is attacked by a cloaked intruder and suffers neurological damage.
127	7	"Dragon's Teeth"	53167.9	Winrich Kolbe	Teleplay by : Michael Taylor and Brannon Braga & Joe Menosky; Story by : Michael Taylor	November 10, 1999	40840-225	5.72
Voyager discovers a network of subspace passageways, but is forced to land on a planet after being attacked.
128	8	"One Small Step"	53292.7, 53301.2	Robert Picardo	Teleplay by : Mike Wollaeger & Jessica Scott and Bryan Fuller & Michael Taylor; Story by : Mike Wollaeger & Jessica Scott	November 17, 1999	40840-228	5.92
Voyager is nearly hit by a mysterious subspace mass and the crew theorize that the debris of an ancient Earth–Mars ship is inside.
129	9	"The Voyager Conspiracy"	53326.9, 53329.1	Terry Windell	Joe Menosky	November 24, 1999	40840-229	5.71
After assimilating Voyager's data from the past six years, through an enhancement to her Borg implants, Seven of Nine suspects the ship did not arrive in the Delta Quadrant by accident.
130	10	"Pathfinder"	53382.7	Mike Vejar	Story by : David Zabel; Teleplay by : David Zabel & Kenneth Biller	December 1, 1999	40840-230	6.15
Barclay gets over-involved with holographic recreations of the Voyager crew in his attempts to contact them. This episode also features Deanna Troi.
131	11	"Fair Haven"	53418.5	Allan Kroeker	Robin Bernheim (Note: Credited as Robin Burger)	January 12, 2000	40840-231	5.19
The crew enjoys a respite inside a holodeck creation designed by Tom Paris, while Voyager faces the threat of an oncoming storm in space.
132	12	"Blink of an Eye"	53541.8	Gabrielle Beaumont	Story by : Michael Taylor; Teleplay by : Joe Menosky	January 19, 2000	40840-233	5.70
Voyager is trapped in orbit about a planet with a spacetime differential such that, while its inhabitants live through years, Voyager experiences mere minutes.
133	13	"Virtuoso"	53556.4	Les Landau	Story by : Raf Green; Teleplay by : Raf Green & Kenneth Biller	January 26, 2000	40840-234	5.81
Visiting aliens who have never before encountered music become fascinated with the Doctor's opera singing, and ask him to leave Voyager and join their society.
134	14	"Memorial"	53621.3	Allan Kroeker	Story by : Brannon Braga; Teleplay by : Robin Bernheim	February 2, 2000	40840-236	5.59
Chakotay, Tom Paris, Harry Kim and Neelix begin to experience horrific flashbacks after an away mission.
135	15	"Tsunkatse"	53447.2, 53529.4	Mike Vejar	Story by : Gannon Kenney; Teleplay by : Robert Doherty	February 9, 2000	40840-232	6.2
Seven of Nine and Tuvok are kidnapped while on shore leave, and Seven is forced to fight in a gladiatorial contest to the death. (Guest stars include J.G. Hertzler, Jeffrey Combs and Dwayne "The Rock" Johnson.
136	16	"Collective"	53582.9	Allison Liddi	Story by : Andrew Shepard Price & Mark Gaberman; Teleplay by : Michael Taylor	February 16, 2000	40840-235	5.32
Chakotay, Kim, Paris, and Neelix are taken hostage when the Delta Flyer is captured by Borg children in a derelict Cube.
137	17	"Spirit Folk"	53659.1	David Livingston	Bryan Fuller	February 23, 2000	40840-237	4.51
Problems arise from running the holographic Irish village of Fair Haven non-stop, when a malfunction leads the holographic characters to become self-aware.
138	18	"Ashes to Ashes"	53679.4	Terry Windell	Story by : Ronald Wilkerson; Teleplay by : Robert Doherty	March 1, 2000	40840-238	5.22
A deceased crew member resurfaces, claiming to have been resurrected by an alien race who have since adopted her.
139	19	"Child's Play"	53722.4	Mike Vejar	Story by : Paul Brown; Teleplay by : Raf Green	March 8, 2000	40840-239	4.68
The family of Icheb, one of the Borg children, is found, but he is reluctant to rejoin them. Seven, too, is reluctant for him to leave the ship; and his parents are concealing the real reason for desiring his return.
140	20	"Good Shepherd"	53753.2	Winrich Kolbe	Story by : Dianna Gitto; Teleplay by : Dianna Gitto and Joe Menosky	March 15, 2000	40840-240	5.55
Three crew members who are under-performing are taken on a mission by Janeway.
141	21	"Live Fast and Prosper"	53849.2	LeVar Burton	Robin Bernheim	April 19, 2000	40840-242	4.85
Con artists impersonate Janeway and Tuvok.
142	22	"Muse"	53896.1	Mike Vejar	Joe Menosky	April 26, 2000	40840-244	4.95
Torres is stranded on a bronze-age planet after a crash in the Delta Flyer, where she helps a playwright adapt the story of Voyager to the stage. Also, Kim is missing in an escape pod.
143	23	"Fury"	53810.5	John Bruno	Teleplay by : Bryan Fuller & Michael Taylor; Story by : Rick Berman & Brannon Braga	May 3, 2000	40840-241	4.65
A much older and more powerful Kes returns to Voyager, and attempts to travel back in time to change her history.
144	24	"Life Line"	53872.6	Terry Windell	Teleplay by : Robert Doherty & Raf Green and Brannon Braga; Story by : John Bruno & Robert Picardo	May 10, 2000	40840-243	5.53
The Doctor's creator, Lewis Zimmerman, is dying in the Alpha Quadrant from a disease similar to the Vidiian phage. The Doctor's compressed matrix is transferred to Zimmerman's lab on the Jupiter station, to assist Mr. Barclay and Counselor Troi in attempting to treat the illness.
145	25	"The Haunting of Deck Twelve"	53937.2	David Livingston	Teleplay by : Mike Sussman and Kenneth Biller & Bryan Fuller; Story by : Mike Sussman	May 17, 2000	40840-245	4.82
As Voyager travels through a nebula, all ship's power is turned off, giving Neelix an opportunity to tell the Borg children a ghost story.
146	26	"Unimatrix Zero: Part I"	Unknown	Allan Kroeker	Story by : Mike Sussman; Teleplay by : Brannon Braga & Joe Menosky	May 24, 2000	40840-246	4.68
Janeway, B'Elanna and Tuvok infiltrate a Borg Cube in an attempt to save Borg drones who are trying to develop individuality.

=== Season 7 (2000–01) ===
No. overall	No. in season	Title	Stardate	Directed by	Written by	Original release date	Prod. code	U.S. viewers (millions)
147	1	"Unimatrix Zero, Part II"	54014.4	Mike Vejar	Story by : Mike Sussman, Brannon Braga and Joe Menosky; Teleplay by : Brannon Braga and Joe Menosky	October 4, 2000	40840-247	7.10
Janeway, B'Elanna and Tuvok are assimilated by the Borg while attempting to save the group of drones who have developed individuality.
148	2	"Imperfection"	54129.4	David Livingston	Story by : André Bormanis; Teleplay by : Carleton Eastlake and Robert Doherty	October 11, 2000	40840-248	5.68
When her cortical implant malfunctions, Seven of Nine needs a life-saving transplant.
149	3	"Drive"	54058.6	Winrich Kolbe	Michael Taylor	October 18, 2000	40840-249	5.82
The crew of Voyager enters the Delta Flyer in a sub-warp race, crewed by Tom Paris and B'Elanna Torres, and events conspire to encourage Tom to propose to her.
150	4	"Repression"	54101	Winrich Kolbe	Story by : Kenneth Biller; Teleplay by : Mark Haskell Smith	October 25, 2000	40840-251	4.97
Ex-Maquis crew members are attacked after a data stream arrives from Starfleet.
151	5	"Critical Care"	Unknown	Terry Windell	Story by : Kenneth Biller and Robert Doherty; Teleplay by : James Kahn	November 1, 2000	40840-250	5.24
The Doctor's program is stolen and he is forced to work in an alien hospital, where he skillfully manipulates the system to provide ethical medical care.
152	6	"Inside Man"	54208.3	Allan Kroeker	Robert Doherty	November 8, 2000	40840-252	4.77
A hologram of Reginald Barclay is sent to Voyager, supposedly to implement a dangerous plan to bring them home; but the hologram has been tampered with by some Ferengi, who are trying to steal valuable Borg nanoprobes from Seven of Nine.
153	7	"Body and Soul"	54238.3	Robert Duncan McNeill	Story by : Michael Taylor; Teleplay by : Eric A. Morris, Phyllis Strong and Mike Sussman	November 15, 2000	40840-255	5.55
During an emergency on a mission, The Doctor is forced to upload his program into Seven of Nine's Borg implants, allowing him to experience real sensations for the first time.
154	8	"Nightingale"	54274.7	LeVar Burton	Story by : Robert Lederman and Dave Long; Teleplay by : André Bormanis	November 22, 2000	40840-256	4.60
Harry Kim takes command of an alien ship that has lost its officers in an attack.
155	9	"Flesh and Blood"	54337.5	Mike Vejar	Story by : Jack Monaco, Bryan Fuller and Raf Green; Teleplay by : Bryan Fuller	November 29, 2000	40840-827 (253/254)	4.95
156	10	"Flesh and Blood"	54337.5	David Livingston	Story by : Bryan Fuller and Raf Green; Teleplay by : Raf Green and Kenneth Biller	November 29, 2000	40840-827 (253/254)	4.95
Voyager's hologram technology, which Janeway had previously donated to the Hirogen, has been modified to make the holographic "prey" more cunning, enabling the hologram characters to rebel against their new masters.
157	11	"Shattered"	Unknown	Terry Windell	Story by : Mike Sussman and Michael Taylor; Teleplay by : Michael Taylor	January 17, 2001	40840-257	4.14
Voyager is fractured into several time periods by an accident, and only Chakotay is able to move between them, in the process meeting old friends and old foes from the previous six seasons.
158	12	"Lineage"	54452.6	Peter Lauritson	James Kahn	January 24, 2001	40840-258	4.38
Now married to Tom Paris, B'Elanna Torres discovers she is pregnant. The Doctor tells her to expect a daughter; but B'Elanna's unresolved fear of the childhood traumas, which she suffered as a part-Klingon girl growing up among humans, makes her determined to remove her child's Klingon DNA.
159	13	"Repentance"	54474.6	Mike Vejar	Story by : Mike Sussman and Robert Doherty; Teleplay by : Robert Doherty	January 31, 2001	40840-259	4.47
Prisoners are brought onto Voyager from a damaged alien vessel, and the crew must deliver them to their destination – for execution. Seven's nanoprobes are used to help heal a prisoner.
160	14	"Prophecy"	54518.2	Terry Windell	Story by : Larry Nemecek, J. Kelley Burke, Raf Green and Kenneth Biller; Teleplay by : Mike Sussman and Phyllis Strong	February 7, 2001	40840-260	4.44
Voyager encounters an ancient Klingon battlecruiser. The Klingons aboard it had set out long ago to find their savior, and they believe it to be Tom and B'Elanna's unborn child.
161	15	"The Void"	54553.4	Mike Vejar	Story by : Raf Green and Kenneth Biller; Teleplay by : Raf Green and James Kahn	February 14, 2001	40840-261	4.63
Voyager is pulled into a void, where the ships that have become trapped attack each other for food and resources.
162	16	"Workforce, Part I"	54584.3	Allan Kroeker	Kenneth Biller and Bryan Fuller	February 21, 2001	40840-262	4.53
The Voyager crew is brainwashed into taking new jobs on an industrialized planet that has a severe labor shortage, leaving only Chakotay, Kim and Neelix (who were on an away mission) and the Doctor (who, in the absence of the crew, has become the Emergency Command Hologram) to save them.
163	17	"Workforce, Part II"	54622.4	Roxann Dawson	Story by : Kenneth Biller and Bryan Fuller; Teleplay by : Kenneth Biller and Michael Taylor	February 28, 2001	40840-263	5.11
Chakotay and Neelix take jobs on the new planet, and try to rescue their amnesiac crewmates – who don't want to leave.
164	18	"Human Error"	Unknown	Allan Kroeker	Story by : André Bormanis and Kenneth Biller; Teleplay by : Brannon Braga and André Bormanis	March 7, 2001	40840-264	5.35
Seven practices her social skills on the holodeck.
165	19	"Q2"	54704.5	LeVar Burton	Story by : Kenneth Biller; Teleplay by : Robert Doherty	April 11, 2001	40840-265	4.64
Q leaves his son (Q2) on Voyager to learn from the crew.
166	20	"Author, Author"	54732.3	David Livingston	Story by : Brannon Braga; Teleplay by : Phyllis Strong and Mike Sussman	April 18, 2001	40840-266	4.46
The Doctor writes a holo-novel to be published in the Alpha Quadrant, featuring characters who closely resemble – but do not flatter – the crew.
167	21	"Friendship One"	54775.4	Mike Vejar	Michael Taylor and Bryan Fuller	April 25, 2001	40840-267	4.62
The crew is sent on its first mission by Starfleet in nearly seven years: to find a lost probe sent by Earth in the 21st century that has ended up in the Delta Quadrant.
168	22	"Natural Law"	54827.7	Terry Windell	Story by : Kenneth Biller and James Kahn; Teleplay by : James Kahn	May 2, 2001	40840-268	4.68
While visiting the planet Ledos, Seven and Chakotay crash through an energy barrier. The two are stranded in the jungle with primitive humanoids, who take the pair in and care for Chakotay's injuries. To rejoin Voyager, he and Seven have to disable the energy barrier.
169	23	"Homestead"	54868.6	LeVar Burton	Raf Green	May 9, 2001	40840-269	5.45
Voyager encounters a Talaxian settlement leaving Neelix with the difficult decision of whether to leave the crew.
170	24	"Renaissance Man"	54912.4	Mike Vejar	Story by : Andrew Shepard Price and Mark Gaberman; Teleplay by : Phyllis Strong and Mike Sussman	May 16, 2001	40840-270	5.55
The Doctor is forced to help aliens steal Voyager's warp core.
171	25	"Endgame"	54973.4	Allan Kroeker	Story by : Rick Berman, Kenneth Biller and Brannon Braga; Teleplay by : Kenneth Biller and Robert Doherty	May 23, 2001	40840-828 (271/272)	8.81
172	26	"Endgame"	54973.4	Allan Kroeker	Story by : Rick Berman, Kenneth Biller and Brannon Braga; Teleplay by : Kenneth Biller and Robert Doherty	May 23, 2001	40840-828 (271/272)	8.81
In the future where it took Voyager 23 years to get home, Admiral Janeway devises a plan to alter history. As the crew enters a final showdown with the Borg, the two Janeways implement a risky plan to take out one of the six Borg Transwarp Hubs in the galaxy and simultaneously cross the transwarp threshold to get home.: Originally shown as a two-hour series finale, but in syndication is shown as two separate episodes.

== See also ==
- List of Star Trek lists
