= Shattered (Star Trek: Voyager) =

- Star Trek: Voyager episode
- Episode no.: Season 7 Episode 11
- Directed by: Terry Windell
- Story by: Mike Sussman; Michael Taylor
- Teleplay by: Michael Taylor
- Cinematography by: Marvin V. Rush
- Production code: 257
- Original air date: January 17, 2001

Guest appearances
- Manu Intiraymi - Icheb; Martha Hackett - Seska; Scarlett Pomers - Naomi Wildman; Mark Bennington - Adult Icheb; Vanessa Branch - Adult Naomi Wildman; Martin Rayner - Dr. Chaotica; Terrell Clayton - Security Officer Andrews; Anthony Holliday - Rulat; Nicholas Worth - Lonzak

Episode chronology
← Previous "Flesh and Blood, Part II"	Next → "Lineage"
- Star Trek: Voyager season 7

"Shattered" is the 157th episode of the American science fiction television series Star Trek: Voyager, aired on the UPN network. It is the eleventh episode of the seventh season.

The series follows the adventures of the Federation starship Voyager, isolated tens of thousands of light-years from home. In this episode, a temporal phenomenon fractures the ship into sections that exist at different points in time, and Commander Chakotay must fight old adversaries to restore the ship to normalcy.

This episode aired on the United Paramount Network (UPN) on January 17, 2001, and was the first Star Trek episode to be broadcast in the 21st century.

== Plot ==
While Commander Chakotay is discussing with Icheb and young Naomi Wildman where to hide a special stash of cider from Neelix, the U.S.S. Voyager is struck by a chronokinetic surge from a rift in space interacting with the ship's warp core. Chakotay is struck with a blast of temporal energy. He regains consciousness in Sickbay where the Doctor has injected him with a chronoton serum to repair injuries from the temporal blast. As Chakotay talks with the Doctor, he finds the Doctor believes it is several years earlier. Chakotay goes exploring the ship, and discovers that various sections of the ship are experiencing different periods of time, a result of the chronokinetic surge. The chronoton serum enables Chakotay to see and travel between these periods, but not other members of the crew.

He makes his way to the bridge, which is currently set a few days before Voyager was taken to the Delta Quadrant and before he joined the crew. Captain Janeway immediately identifies him as a spy despite his pleas, and orders him taken to the brig, but en route, they pass through another time period, which Chakotay passes into but not his captors. During his exploration he finds that Engineering has been taken over by Seska and other Kazon, and though captured, he managed to escape due to his ability to travel between these time periods. Chakotay returns to Sick Bay and has the Doctor create more of the chronoton serum, then returns to the bridge, injects Janeway with the serum, and takes her to another time period to avoid capture.

Janeway is initially hostile towards Chakotay's actions, but he demonstrates what has happened to the ship and she becomes more trusting of him. They go to Astrometrics, which is set 23 years in the future and is staffed by Lieutenant Commander Icheb and Lieutenant Naomi Wildman, both adults, who are surprised by their appearance, as in their timeline Janeway and Chakotay had died 17 years earlier. The two are able to provide Chakotay with details on the chronokinetic surge and suggestions for how to restore Voyager to normal, and Icheb implies that he never revealed the location of Chakotay's cider stash. Later, they encounter Seven of Nine shortly after her arrival on Voyager, and her Borg knowledge provides a plan for restoring the ship to normal—if Chakotay injects the chronoton serum into the ship's organic gel-packs, all parts of the ships will align with Chakotay's timeframe.

As Chakotay and Janeway travel through the temporally-disjointed ship to enact this plan, Seska discovers their intent and decides to use the same plan to align the ship to her period, thus allowing her to control Voyager using knowledge from the future to assure she maintains control. She takes Chakotay and Janeway prisoner, but during Chakotay and Janeway's tour of the times on the ship, they have been able to convince most of the other crew to work against the Kazon and they are rescued. Chakotay injects the serum in the ship and it is realigned to his time period, with all individuals returning to their proper times. He finds he has ended up moments before the chronokinetic pulse is due to strike. He quickly orders Lt. Torres to blow out the ship's deflector, which prevents the interaction that caused the time fractures. Later, Chakotay and Janeway have dinner together, where Chakotay tells Janeway he cannot reveal why he ordered the deflector blown out due to the Temporal Prime Directive. He is surprised that Janeway knows of his cider stash, but Janeway refuses to answer, claiming she too is bound by the Temporal Prime Directive.

== Continuity ==
The following previous episodes specifically cover areas of Voyager's past that "Shattered" references:

- "Caretaker" - After Chakotay meets the younger Janeway and before confronting the incarcerated Maquis crew
- "Basics, Part II" - The Kazon, with Seska, control the starship Voyager
- "Macrocosm" - The ship is infested with a macrovirus
- "Scorpion" - Borg drones are aboard Voyager
- "Bliss" - The crew has succumbed to the Venus Flytrap creature
- "Bride of Chaotica!" - Paris' program is active in the Holodeck

== Reception ==
In 2015, Den of Geek suggested "Shattered" for a binge-watching guide that focused on Star Trek: Voyager episodes featuring time travel.

In 2018, CBR rated it the 16th best time travel story across the Star Trek franchise.

2018 and 2022 Georgia Democratic gubernatorial candidate Stacey Abrams, who has spoken at length about how the philosophy of Star Trek has shaped her personal and political beliefs, is a fan of episodes about "space-time anomalies," and this installment in particular. In 2019, a New York Times interview with Abrams about her love of Star Trek stated: "One of her favorite things is 'Shattered,' the 157th episode of Voyager, in which the ship goes through a temporal rift that tantalizingly splits it into different timelines." The article adds: "[Abrams] admires Captain Picard but reveres Admiral Janeway."

In 2021, The Digital Fix said this was a "good episode" and were happy with the cameos and time shifting.

== Releases and home media ==
On December 21, 2004, this episode was released on DVD as part of a Season 7 boxset; Star Trek Voyager: Complete Seventh Season.
