= Gravity (Star Trek: Voyager) =

- Star Trek: Voyager episode
- Episode no.: Season 5 Episode 13
- Directed by: Terry Windell
- Story by: Jimmy Diggs; Bryan Fuller; Nick Sagan
- Teleplay by: Nick Sagan; Bryan Fuller
- Cinematography by: Marvin V. Rush
- Production code: 205
- Original air date: February 3, 1999

Guest appearances
- Lori Petty - Noss; Joseph Ruskin - Vulcan Master; LeRoy D. Brazile - Young Tuvok; Paul Eckstein - Yost

Episode chronology
← Previous "Bride of Chaotica!"	Next → "Bliss"
- Star Trek: Voyager season 5

"Gravity" is the 107th episode of the American science fiction television series Star Trek: Voyager originally airing on the UPN network, the 13th episode of the fifth season. Lori Petty guest stars as the alien Noss. Joseph Ruskin, who played Galt in the original Star Trek episode "The Gamesters of Triskelion", is the Vulcan Master in this episode of Voyager.

This episode features flashbacks where Tuvok, as a teenager, is sent to a Vulcan sanctuary to learn to control his emotions. It originally aired on UPN on February 3, 1999.

== Plot ==
Tuvok, Tom Paris, and the Doctor are stranded on a planet where (unknown to them) time is moving faster than it is in the rest of the universe. While Tuvok searches the surrounding area, Paris remains behind to try to establish communications with Voyager which they increasingly expect to be long gone. An alien woman robs them of much needed equipment and leaves, but is quickly attacked by a small hunting group of another species. Tuvok disarms the group and brings the woman back to the damaged shuttle for medical attention. With the assistance of the Doctor, Paris and Tuvok learn to communicate with the woman, named Noss, who has been trapped on the planet for "14 seasons".

Meanwhile, the crew of the Voyager finds the gravimetric distortion that the away team's shuttle went into. A probe is launched to determine if contact could be made, however the situation is complicated by the arrival of an alien salvage team bent on closing the distortion, an action which would crush everything within it - including Tuvok, Paris and Noss.

During their time on the planet, Noss develops an attraction to Tuvok. He initially ignores the attraction due to an incident with another woman years ago that forced him to retreat to a Vulcan master in an attempt to purge his emotions. The lack of mutual attraction angers Noss.

Janeway and the crew determine that by using the probe's relays, a signal can be sent to the emergency beacon Paris activated and use it as a transporter link. They also determine that a temporal disruption in the sinkhole causes time to pass quickly for the away team. For every 0.4744 of a second for the Voyager crew, a minute would pass for Tuvok and Paris. With the aliens ahead of schedule in their efforts to close the sinkhole, Janeway orders a message sent to the beacon with beam out instructions.

Staged at a damaged spacecraft used by Noss, the stranded officers receive the message. Despite a last minute attack by a large group of aliens, everyone is able to be beamed off the planet and out of the sinkhole. It is the first time they had set foot on the ship in over two months. From Janeway and the others' point of view, they were only missing for two days.

Before Noss returns to her homeworld, she and Tuvok privately conduct a mind-meld, silently and telepathically sharing their feelings for each other.

== Reception ==
In 2012, Den of Geek listed this as an honorable mention for their ranking of the top ten episodes of Star Trek: Voyager. TV Guide noted the guest star role of actress Lori Petty, known for starring in films such as Tank Girl, Point Break (1991), and A League of Their Own.

In 2017, Den of Geek ranked Lori Petty as Noss as the 8th best guest star on Star Trek: Voyager.

== Home media releases ==
On April 25, 2001, this episode was released on LaserDisc in Japan, as part of the half-season collection, 5th Season vol.1 . This included episodes from "Night" to "Bliss" on seven double sided 12 inch optical discs, with English and Japanese audio tracks for the episodes.

On November 9, 2004, this episode was released as part of the season 5 DVD box set of Star Trek: Voyager. The box set includes 7 DVD optical discs with all the episodes in season 5 with some extra features, and episodes have a Dolby Digital 5.1 surround sound audio track.
