= Endgame (Star Trek: Voyager) =

- Star Trek: Voyager episodes
- Episode nos.: Season 7 Episodes 25 & 26
- Directed by: Allan Kroeker
- Story by: Rick Berman; Kenneth Biller; Brannon Braga
- Teleplay by: Kenneth Biller; Robert Doherty
- Cinematography by: Marvin V. Rush
- Production code: 271
- Original air date: May 23, 2001

Guest appearances
- Alice Krige as Borg Queen; Dwight Schultz as Reginald Barclay; Vaughn Armstrong as Korath; Manu Intiraymi as Icheb; Lisa Locicero as Ensign Miral Paris; Miguel Perez as Physician; Grant Garrison as Cadet; Amy Lindsay as Lana; Ashley Sierra Hughes as Sabrina Wildman; Richard Herd as Admiral Owen Paris

Episode chronology
← Previous "Renaissance Man"	Next → —
- Star Trek: Voyager season 7

"Endgame" is the series finale of the American science fiction television series Star Trek: Voyager, episodes 25 and 26 of the seventh season and 171 and 172 in the overall series. It was originally shown May 23, 2001, on the UPN network as a double-length episode and later presented as such in DVD collections, but it is shown in syndicated broadcasts as a two-part story.

== Plot ==
In the year 2404, the Federation and the re-assembled crew of Voyager are celebrating the 10th anniversary of the ship's return to Earth, 23 years after it was stranded in the Delta Quadrant. Kathryn Janeway – now an admiral – reminisces with her crew, but reflects on the high personal costs of the long journey. She launches a plot to undo some of them by intervening at a key point in their history, changing a decision she now regrets. She steals an illegal time travel device and – with the reluctant help of now-Captain Harry Kim – takes a shuttlecraft back to 2378, where she meets up with Voyager, still in the Delta Quadrant. She pulls rank on younger Captain Janeway and orders the ship to return to a nebula filled with Borg that they had passed a few days before. She provides advanced technologies that allow Voyager to survive the massive Borg defenses, destroy two Borg vessels, and enter a transwarp corridor, which the Borg use for interstellar travel. Voyager comes upon a Borg transwarp hub, which connects distant parts of the galaxy, and could save the ship from sixteen more years stranded in the Delta Quadrant.

However, Captain Janeway wants to use Admiral Janeway's future technology to instead destroy the transwarp network; the Admiral states that this can only be done from its terminus in the Delta Quadrant, before explaining that 23 additional crew members will die on the remainder of their trip home, including Seven of Nine (whose death will emotionally devastate Chakotay), and that Tuvok will develop dementia from a neurological condition that could have been treated in the Alpha Quadrant. Troubled by the choice, Captain Janeway discusses the issue with the crew, who agree that destroying the hub – severely diminishing the Borg threat to the Alpha Quadrant – is more important. The admiral is inspired by their spirit, and works with the captain on a scheme to do both.

The admiral takes her shuttlecraft and enters the transwarp hub, arriving at the Unicomplex – the center of all Borg activity and the home of the Borg Queen. (Note: Alice Krige returns to the role of the Borg Queen for the first time since Star Trek: First Contact. The character was portrayed by Susanna Thompson in three previous Voyager episodes.) She pretends to offer a deal in defiance of the captain's plans: her future technologies, in exchange for sending Voyager safely home. However, the Queen captures the admiral and begins to assimilate her into the Borg collective. Admiral Janeway then turns the tables by unleashing a pathogen she was carrying in her bloodstream into the collective, devastating it and killing the Queen. The Unicomplex suffers a cascade failure and explodes, killing the admiral as well.

Meanwhile, Captain Janeway and Voyager have entered a transwarp corridor, pursued by a surviving Borg sphere that is trying to destroy Voyager and crew in a last-chance attempt to create a time-travel paradox that will undo the devastating damage that Admiral Janeway has just done. Unable to fight back against the sphere's defenses, Captain Janeway takes Voyager inside it, destroying it from the inside just as they emerge from the collapsing transwarp corridor near Earth. They are met by a fleet of Starfleet vessels that had been sent to confront the Borg, which instead escort Voyager home to Earth. B'Elanna Torres gives birth to her and Tom Paris’ child.

== Production ==
It was originally expected that a character would die in order to return Voyager to Earth, with Kate Mulgrew saying in an interview that one of the characters would die in one of the final frames of the series finale – but added that it didn't mean she was saying that it would be Janeway who would perish. In 2015, Brannon Braga stated on Twitter that he felt that it should have been Seven of Nine who died in the finale, and that he had written the episode "Human Error" specifically to set this up.

== Awards ==
This episode won two Emmy Awards, which only four other Star Trek episodes have done. It won for Outstanding Music Composition For A Series (Dramatic Underscore) (Jay Chattaway) and Outstanding Special Visual Effects for a Series, in both cases beating the Voyager episode "Workforce", which was also nominated in those categories. "Endgame" was also nominated for Outstanding Sound Editing For A Series.

== Reception ==
In 2015, SyFy ranked "Endgame" as one of the top ten episodes of the series.

In 2016, on the fiftieth anniversary of the franchise, multiple publications included "Endgame" in episode rankings. The Hollywood Reporter rated "Endgame" the 54th best television episode of all Star Trek franchise television prior to Star Trek: Discovery, including live-action and the animated series, but not counting the movies. They also ranked "Endgame" the sixth best episode of the Star Trek: Voyager series. SyFy ranked "Endgame" as the third best finale of Star Trek series up to 2016. SyFy ranked "Endgame" as the eighth best time travel plot in Star Trek. Empire ranked this the 48th best out of the top fifty episodes of all the 700 plus Star Trek television episodes. Radio Times ranked the return of the USS Voyager to Earth as the 30th greatest moment in all Star Trek, including films and television up to that time (2016).

In 2017, Netflix announced that "Endgame" was one of six Star Trek: Voyager episodes (Note: Star Trek: Voyager was also represented on the list by "The Gift", "Time and Again", the feature length episode "Dark Frontier", and both episodes in the two-part "Scorpion". When compiling its top ten list, Netflix purposely excluded the series premiere and second episode from each of the then-six series in the franchise, in order to "seek data beyond default behavior".) in the top ten most re-watched Star Trek franchise episodes on its streaming service, based on data since the franchise was added to Netflix in 2011.

In 2019, Nerdist rated Captain Kathryn Janeway one of the top seven time-traveling characters in all of Star Trek for her role in "Endgame". The same year, Nerdist also suggested watching "Endgame" as part of an abbreviated binge-watching guide featuring USS Voyager's confrontations with the Borg. They also ranked it as the fifth best time-travel episode of all Star Trek in between "Tomorrow is Yesterday" (#6) and "All Good Things..." (#4).

Also in 2019, SyFy recommend this episode for its Seven of Nine binge-watching guide.

In 2021, Screen Rant ranked "Endgame" the sixth best episode with the Borg, based on an IMDB rating of 8.6 out 10.

== Novelization ==
A novelized version of "Endgame" was adapted by Diane Carey, and published in 2002. Some related Star Trek episodes were also novelized, including the Star Trek: Voyager television premiere "Caretaker", which was released as a 278-page novel called "Caretaker", and as an audiobook in 1995 by Simon & Schuster.

Two additional novels based on Voyager's return are Homecoming and The Farther Shore, both by Christie Golden.

== See also ==
- Endgame (Stargate SG-1) (this is also the episode title of a similarly named TV series that aired the following year)
