= List of Star Trek: Voyager characters =

Wikipedia list

This is a list of minor fictional characters from the science fiction television series Star Trek: Voyager. Characters here are members of the crew, or passengers, on the starship Voyager as it makes its way home through unknown space during the course of the series. The minor characters generally appear at most in several episodes (out of 172), sometimes in episodes that largely concern them. Of these characters, the only ones who joined the ship during its travels are the four alien children (Azan, Icheb, Mezoti, and Rebi) taken from a Borg cube.

Characters are ordered alphabetically by family name, and only characters who played a significant recurring role in any of the series are listed.

For the main cast, see Star Trek: Voyager#Cast. Due to the connected nature of the Star Trek science fiction universe, these characters may have appeared in the other Star Trek media.

== Ayala ==
Ayala
- Star Trek character
- Portrayed by: Tarik Ergin (Only credited in "Fury" and "Renaissance Man"

In-universe information
- Species: Human
- Affiliation: Maquis; Starfleet
- Posting: Maquis Raider; USS Voyager engineering officer, operations officer, security officer, helmsman
- Rank: Lieutenant junior grade

Ayala was played by Tarik Ergin. He appears in the background of most episodes, in total 126 according to IMDB, more than any other "named extra". He speaks, briefly, in a handful of episodes. He is the only character other than the regulars to appear in both the pilot episode and the finale.

Ayala, the father of two, is originally a Maquis insurgent on Chakotay's ship. Ayala joins Voyager's crew as a security officer, serving under the command of Captain Kathryn Janeway with the provisional rank of lieutenant junior grade.

Ayala serves in main engineering and at ops when Ensign Kim is not on duty, but later transfers to security. He is often seen on the bridge as a relief tactical officer when Tuvok leaves the bridge. Ayala later served as a relief helmsman when Tom Paris wasn't on duty.

In "Twisted", Ayala is left in command of the bridge while the ship is affected by a distortion ring being and the senior staff is confined to the holodecks.

In "Shattered", Chakotay encounters an alternate version of Ayala seven years younger who helps Chakotay and other time-tossed Voyager crew combat a threat posed by time-distorted Kazon invaders who hold engineering.

In "Repression", Ayala is one of the Maquis who are temporarily brainwashed into taking control of the ship. He becomes one of Chakotay's personal guards.

== Azan, Rebi, and Mezoti ==
Azan and Rebi
- Star Trek character
- Portrayed by: Kurt and Cody Wetherill

In-universe information
- Species: Wysanti
- Affiliation: None (formerly the Borg)

Mezoti
- Star Trek character
- Portrayed by: Marley S. McClean

In-universe information
- Species: Norcadian
- Affiliation: None (formerly the Borg)

Azan and Rebi are brothers, natives of the Wysanti race. Mezoti is a young Norcadian girl, born about 2368. All three were abducted and assimilated by the cybernetic aliens known as the Borg.

In 2376, the Borg cube they were residing on as drones was disabled when all the adult drones on the vessel were killed by a pathogen that was carried on board by another abductee, Icheb. The Cube and the five surviving neonatal drones were abandoned by the Collective without their knowledge.

The young drones encountered the USS Voyager and attempted to acquire technology that would help them re-establish their link with the Borg, but their efforts failed and they were brought aboard Voyager and carefully stripped of most of their cybernetic implants.

They lived on Voyager for several months under the mentorship of Seven of Nine, a fellow ex-drone, where they began to receive an education. Then Voyager located the Wysanti and the brothers returned home in early 2377. As Captain Janeway had been unable to contact the Norcadians, Mezoti joined them and was eagerly welcomed by the Wysanti.

== Joseph Carey ==
Joseph Carey
- Star Trek character
- Portrayed by: Josh Clark

In-universe information
- Species: Human
- Affiliation: Starfleet
- Position: Assistant chief engineer
- Rank: Lieutenant

Joseph "Joe" Carey is a fictional recurring character in Star Trek: Voyager. He is a human Starfleet officer.

An engineer aboard USS Voyager, Carey serves under B'Elanna Torres. In 2371, Carey is briefly named acting chief engineer when the original officer in that position is killed during the ship's violent passage to the Delta Quadrant, in which Voyager was flung over 70,000 light-years to the Delta Quadrant in the "Caretaker" episode, with Carey favored to be the replacement.

However, after some deliberation, Torres was made chief engineer in the "Parallax" episode by Captain Janeway, as Torres showed better abilities than Carey when the ship was trapped in a quantum singularity and took the lead in engineering. Carey congratulated her and promised to never betray her command, and thereafter serves as her assistant, despite there having initially been some friction between the two. He is disappointed with Janeway's decision but recognizes Torres' superior abilities.

In 2377, Carey was assigned to join the away team to recover the remains of the Friendship One probe from the planet Uxal IV in the "Friendship One" episode. The away team discovered that the inhabitants of the planet had been irradiated by antimatter radiation caused by the probe. Unfortunately, Carey was murdered by a man named Verin, who had taken the away team hostage. At the time of his death, he had been working on a model of Voyager, which Captain Janeway and Commander Chakotay finished.

== Chell ==
Chell
- Star Trek character
- Portrayed by: Derek McGrath

In-universe information
- Species: Bolian
- Affiliation: First Maquis, then Starfleet
- Rank: Crewman

Chell is a fictional recurring character in Star Trek: Voyager. He is a Bolian. Chell is first introduced in the episode "Learning Curve", which is set in 2371.

Chell, along with many other Voyager crewmen, originally served under Chakotay with the Maquis, until their ship was dragged to the Delta Quadrant by an entity known as the Caretaker. The ship was destroyed after Chakotay performed a suicide run on a Kazon ship. Transporters were used to avoid any casualties.

Chell and the other Maquis were forced to merge with Voyager's crew on the long 70-year journey home to the Alpha Quadrant. Chell had disciplinary problems during the first year of Voyager's journey, such as talking out of turn. Chell ended up as a special group assigned to be trained Starfleet protocols by Tuvok, the ship's tactical officer. The others in the group included three other Maquis, Crewman Mariah Henley, Kenneth Dalby and Gerron, a Bajoran. At first Chell and the others were rude and disrespectful to Tuvok, but eventually improved under training. The group soon saved the ship from a plasma leak. Tuvok himself was saved from personal danger by the group, even though this violated orders.

In 2377, Maquis were being physically attacked, though they soon recovered from their injuries. Chell loudly voices his thoughts indicating he had never become comfortable with Starfleet personnel. After Voyager's resident Talaxian, Neelix left the ship in 2378, Chell asked to take his place in the mess hall. Janeway reviewed his planned menu, which was full of food/ship puns. Chell's plans were cut short when Voyager soon returned home to the Alpha Quadrant.

Chell's role as a character is expanded upon greatly when he appeared in the Activision game Star Trek Voyager: Elite Force as a member of the Hazard Team. He is also featured in the tie-in comic book released by Wildstorm Comics in 1999.

== Icheb ==
Icheb
- Star Trek character
- First appearance: "Collective" (VOY)
- Last appearance: "Stardust City Rag" (Picard)
- Portrayed by: VOY: Manu Intiraymi, Mark Bennington Picard; Casey King

In-universe information
- Species: Brunali
- Affiliation: Formerly the Borg, Starfleet
- Rank: Lieutenant

"Your ocular implant. It's malfunctioning again."

— Icheb, "Imperfection"

Icheb was played by Manu Intiraymi. He was assimilated by the Borg and has many parallels with the character Seven of Nine: they were both assimilated by the Borg while small children, were separated from the Borg hive mind, and restored close to their pre-Borg selves with the help of the crew of Voyager and Captain Janeway.

After Icheb was assimilated he was placed inside a Borg maturation chamber where he was to grow into an adult drone until an apparently space-borne virus infected the vessel he was aboard and consequently killed all the adult drones, disconnecting the vessel from the Borg. This caused the chamber to open and Icheb to emerge as an underdeveloped Borg drone.

He was not the only neonatal drone aboard, and the other drones that emerged (Azan, Rebi and Mezoti, plus an unnamed 'First') from their maturation chambers formed their own small collective to run the ship and return to the Borg. At this point, in the episode "Collective", they encountered Voyager. First was dangerously unstable and was eventually killed in the cube's explosion while Captain Janeway persuaded the other children to abandon the Borg cube and join Voyager.

As with Seven of Nine, the crew of Voyager restored the Borg children to their pre-Borg selves by removing most of their Borg implants and counseling them as they regained their normal personalities.

In the episode "Child's Play", Icheb was facing a reunion with his parents. He met them, and at first was reluctant to return to the mainly agricultural planet, compared to the advanced technology and science of Voyager. Eventually, he warmed to his parents and elected to stay with them.

It then emerged that the people of his homeworld had genetically engineered Icheb to be a weapon against the Borg using the genetic knowledge they had applied to agriculture. When assimilated, he introduced a biological virus into the collective; it was this virus that first disabled the Borg ship from which he and the other adolescent drones were recovered. His parents were planning to use him in this way again, to protect their homeworld, which frequently came under attack by the Borg. He was sedated by his parents, placed on a ship engineered to emit a false warp signature to attract the Borg, and sent toward a transwarp conduit frequently used by the Borg. Voyager retrieved Icheb before his ship was tractored into the Borg ship.

Icheb had many talents intellectually and fit in well with the crew of Voyager. His main position on Voyager was assisting Seven of Nine in the astrometrics laboratory. He sought to be admitted to the Starfleet Academy through training courses provided by the senior officers aboard Voyager. Partial communication was established with Starfleet Command on Earth, through which Icheb sat for and passed the entrance exam to the Academy. He gained the field rank of cadet from Captain Janeway.

The episode "Shattered" featured an alternate timeline set in 2394 in which an adult Icheb (who had attained a field commission in Starfleet of Lieutenant Commander) helped Janeway and Chakotay restore Voyager to the correct space and time after it was hit by a "chronokinetic surge" that altered the ship. He did this by using advanced instruments that he and Naomi Wildman developed in the astrometrics lab.

In "Imperfection," Seven's cortical node -- a vital Borg implant -- malfunctioned with no hope of repair or replacement. Icheb volunteered his own cortical node, citing his age and lesser dependence upon on his Borg implants for survival than Seven. Although reluctant to risk Icheb's life, Seven agreed and the procedure was a success.

Icheb's final appearance in Voyager's last episode features him beating Tuvok at Kal-toh the very first time he plays it. Since Icheb is exceptionally bright he may have a natural ability at the game – Icheb himself attributes the win to 'beginner's luck' – but this loss is the last in a series of inconsistencies that leads Tuvok to suspect he has a chronic Vulcan disease.

Icheb makes a cameo appearance in the Star Trek: Picard episode "Stardust City Rag". Now a Lieutenant serving in Starfleet, Icheb is mortally wounded when his Borg components are harvested, while he is awake and not anesthetized. In agony and dying, Icheb begs Seven to kill him and end his suffering. Seven refers to him as “my child”, then reluctantly complies. In the present of the episode, Seven seeks revenge upon the person who was responsible for Icheb's death.

Intiraymi portrayed Icheb in the non-canon 2015 fan film Star Trek: Renegades.

== Michael Jonas ==
Michael Jonas
- Star Trek character
- Portrayed by: Raphael Sbarge

In-universe information
- Species: Human
- Affiliation: Starfleet
- Posting: USS Voyager
- Position: Engineer

Michael Jonas was played by Raphael Sbarge. A member of the Maquis crew that joined with Voyager's in the year 2371, he quickly lost faith in Captain Kathryn Janeway's ability to bring USS Voyager home safely. He was particularly affected by the death of Kurt Bendera, a popular member of the Maquis aspect of the crew.

He began betraying secrets of Voyager to his former ally, Seska, a Cardassian spy among the Maquis, who had abandoned Voyager for a life aboard a Kazon Nistrim vessel. He sent the Kazon all that Voyager knew about breaking the Warp 10 barrier. He was killed in the second season of the show after a struggle with Neelix, who had been investigating who the traitor on Voyager was.

== Lon Suder ==
Lon Suder
- Star Trek character
- Portrayed by: Brad Dourif

In-universe information
- Species: Betazoid
- Affiliation: Maquis, then Starfleet
- Posting: USS Voyager engineer
- Rank: Crewman

Lon Suder, played by Brad Dourif, is an engineer on Voyager.

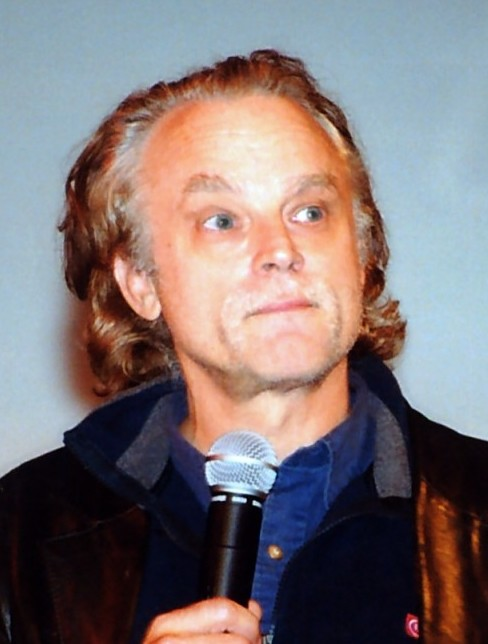
Brad Dourif (pictured in 2002) portrayed Lon Suder.

Suder is a sociopathic Betazoid mercenary, who, unlike most Betazoids, is disconnected from his own, and others', emotions. Many of the Maquis had been uncomfortable serving with Suder, who seemed to enjoy killing rather than having joined to further the Maquis cause. Suder later admits that this is exactly why he joined the Maquis: he likes to kill, and the Maquis provided a sufficient outlet for his rage.

While on Voyager, however, Suder cannot find an adequate release for his violent tendencies, and by the episode "Meld" he kills fellow crewman Frank Darwin in a murderous fury. Lieutenant Tuvok, refusing to accept Suder's explanation that he killed Darwin for no reason, mind melds with Suder in an attempt to discover the truth and to bestow upon the troubled crewman some of his own Vulcan self-discipline. However, the meld affects Tuvok, transmitting Suder's sociopathy to the Vulcan. Tuvok, mentally ill, ultimately tries to kill Suder, who does not fight back as he is prepared to die. Tuvok, partly helped by Suder's warnings that the violence will become his entire life, resists the temptation. The Doctor says this is a sign Tuvok is healing from his madness. Suder is sentenced to life imprisonment in his quarters until he can be rehabilitated. Over time, he finds that he has a natural talent for plant biology, and requests to help Voyager to both gain trust and become a part of the crew again.

When the Kazon and Cardassian spy Seska takes over Voyager in "Basics" and strands the crew on a desolate planet, only Suder and the ship's doctor are left on board. Struggling with his newfound inner peace and conscience, Suder is forced to revisit his violent ways to rescue his crewmates. He aids the Doctor in wresting control of the ship from the Kazon, at one point becoming nearly catatonic after being forced to kill. In a final, selfless act of sabotage, Suder kills a group of Kazon in the Engineering room and sabotages Voyager's backup phaser couplings just after he is fatally shot by a Kazon soldier. Because of his actions, Paris and some Talaxian comrades are able to retake Voyager. Tuvok later offers a Vulcan blessing over Suder's body that death might bring Suder the peace he could not find in life.

== Seska ==
Seska
- Star Trek character
- Portrayed by: Martha Hackett

In-universe information
- Species: Cardassian
- Affiliation: Kazon, Cardassian Union
- Posting: Spy aboard USS Voyager
- Rank: None (formerly Ensign)

Seska first appears in the episode "Parallax" as a Bajoran crewmember absorbed from the Maquis ship in the episode "Caretaker". In the episode "State of Flux", she is revealed to be a Cardassian undercover agent, who had infiltrated the Maquis cell. During her time with the Maquis, Seska had a love affair with her commander, former Starfleet officer Chakotay and befriended the half-Klingon, half-human B'Elanna Torres. Seska's former relationship with Chakotay would later prove key to her plan to capture Voyager in the double-episode story "Basics".

Once aboard Voyager, Seska slowly melded into a normal life with the mixed Starfleet–Maquis crew, a process not without difficulty. After several clashes with the ship's rigid command structure and increasing frustration with the command of Captain Kathryn Janeway, Seska detached herself from the rest of the crew and began funneling assistance to the Kazon. She was caught while attempting to deliver replicator technology to the enemy and upon her apprehension, her true Cardassian identity was discovered by the Doctor. Seska fled to the Kazon whereupon Jal Culluh took her as a lover.

The Kazon were able to capture Voyager with Seska's help after she joined their crew. Seska claimed to have impregnated herself with her former lover Chakotay's DNA and used the child as bait, knowing Chakotay would never abandon the child to the Kazon and its mother. The Kazon attacked the USS Voyager when it came for the child and were able to board and take over the vessel. During the short period when the Voyager crew was marooned on a planet, the Doctor learned that the child was half Cardassian and half Kazon and told Seska the child was Culluh's. The Doctor explained that despite the baby's somewhat human appearance the child would probably develop Kazon features later on.

Seska was killed when the Voyager crew retook the ship from the Kazon. Culluh escaped, taking their son with him. Almost a year after her death, in the episode "Worst Case Scenario", a holodeck program she had altered to kill Tuvok, was discovered in the ship's memory and nearly accomplished its purpose before it was deactivated. Later, in "Shattered," when Voyager was caught in a temporal rift that placed sections of the ship in different times, engineering was in the time period where the Kazon had captured the ship. Seska was featured in this episode as well and her control of the ship was stopped by a collaboration of crew members from various times.

=== Reception ===
In 2015, SyFy rated Seska as among the top 21 most interesting supporting characters of Star Trek.

In 2018, CBR ranked Seska the 18th best recurring character of Star Trek shows. They elaborate, "Martha Hackett was fantastic in the part, showcasing Seska’s transformation from supposedly loyal fighter to a scheming vixen."

In 2020, The Digital Fix said that Seska was the standout character from season one, and that Hackett was a better actor than the main cast of the show in season one.

== Vorik ==
Vorik
- Star Trek character
- Portrayed by: Alexander Enberg

In-universe information
- Species: Vulcan
- Affiliation: Starfleet
- Posting: USS Voyager
- Position: Engineer
- Rank: Ensign

Ensign Vorik, played by Alexander Enberg, is a Vulcan male who serves aboard Voyager as an engineer.

Ensign Vorik was introduced in full as a minor character in the episode "Fair Trade". In the episode "Blood Fever", Vorik underwent his first pon farr on stardate 50537 while Voyager was stranded in the Delta Quadrant. Approximately 75,000 light years from his arranged mate, Vorik declared kun-ut so'lik with his superior officer, Lt. Torres. When she refused, Vorik became desperate and accidentally (and unknowingly) initiated a telepathic mating bond with her, which triggered her own Klingon mating instincts. Vorik was forced to search for alternative ways to resolve his pon farr, but he found no relief from meditation or a holographic mate. Eventually, having exhausted all of his options, Vorik made the challenge of combat in the ritual kun-ut kal-if-fee, for the right to mate with B'Elanna. An enraged B'Elanna took the challenge herself, defeating Vorik and curing them both of the pon farr. After they recovered, both Vorik and B'Elanna returned to normal duty.

In the episode "Counterpoint", while Voyager crossed Devore space, Vorik was one of several telepathic crew members who were suspended in the transporter pattern buffer to avoid detection by the Devore inspections, led by Kashyk. Vorik's eighth, and last, appearance was the penultimate episode of the series, "Renaissance Man".

Star Trek: Voyager producer and writer Jeri Taylor, Enberg's mother, has suggested that Vorik is the twin brother of Taurik, another Vulcan Starfleet engineer played by Enberg in the Star Trek: The Next Generation episode "Lower Decks".

In the novel Homecoming Part 1 by Christie Golden, when Voyager gets back to Earth, Vorik was promoted to Lieutenant Junior Grade for his seven years of service on USS Voyager.

== Samantha Wildman ==
Samantha Wildman
- Star Trek character
- Portrayed by: Nancy Hower

In-universe information
- Species: Human
- Affiliation: Starfleet
- Posting: USS Voyager
- Position: Xenobiologist
- Rank: Ensign

Ensign Samantha Wildman, played by actress Nancy Hower, joined Voyager as a xenobiologist, not knowing she was pregnant by her Ktarian husband Greskrendtregk. She gave birth to Naomi in 2372. She chose Neelix as Naomi's godfather.

The character was named after a real person, a seven year-old girl who died in an accident and whose parents donated her organs. A kidney transplant from her saved the life of Voyager writer Jimmy Diggs's wife Linette, and he gratefully named a character after the girl.
