= Dark Frontier =

- Star Trek: Voyager episodes
- Episode nos.: Season 5 Episodes 15 & 16
- Directed by: Cliff Bole; Terry Windell
- Written by: Brannon Braga; Joe Menosky
- Production codes: 211 & 212
- Original air date: February 17, 1999

Guest appearances
- Susanna Thompson as Borg Queen; Kirk Baily as Magnus Hansen; Laura Stepp as Erin Hansen; Katelin Peterson as Annika Hansen; Scarlett Pomers as Naomi Wildman; Eric Cadora as Alien

Episode chronology
← Previous "Bliss"	Next → "The Disease"
- Star Trek: Voyager season 5

"Dark Frontier" is a feature-length episode of Star Trek: Voyager, the 15th and 16th episodes of the fifth season. This episode originally aired as a feature-length episode that was later broken up into two parts for reruns in syndication. Actress Susanna Thompson guest stars alongside the cast of this Star Trek television show as the Borg queen. The crew of a spacecraft trying to get back to Earth once again encounter a race of cybernetic organisms bent on Galactic domination. Ex-Borg character Seven of Nine (played by Jeri Ryan) struggles with her past as she rediscovers her humanity aboard the spacecraft.

The episode was written by Brannon Braga and Joe Menosky, with direction by Cliff Bole and Terry Windell. It aired on UPN on February 17, 1999.

"Dark Frontier" won an Emmy award for Outstanding Special Visual Effects for a Series.

== Overview ==
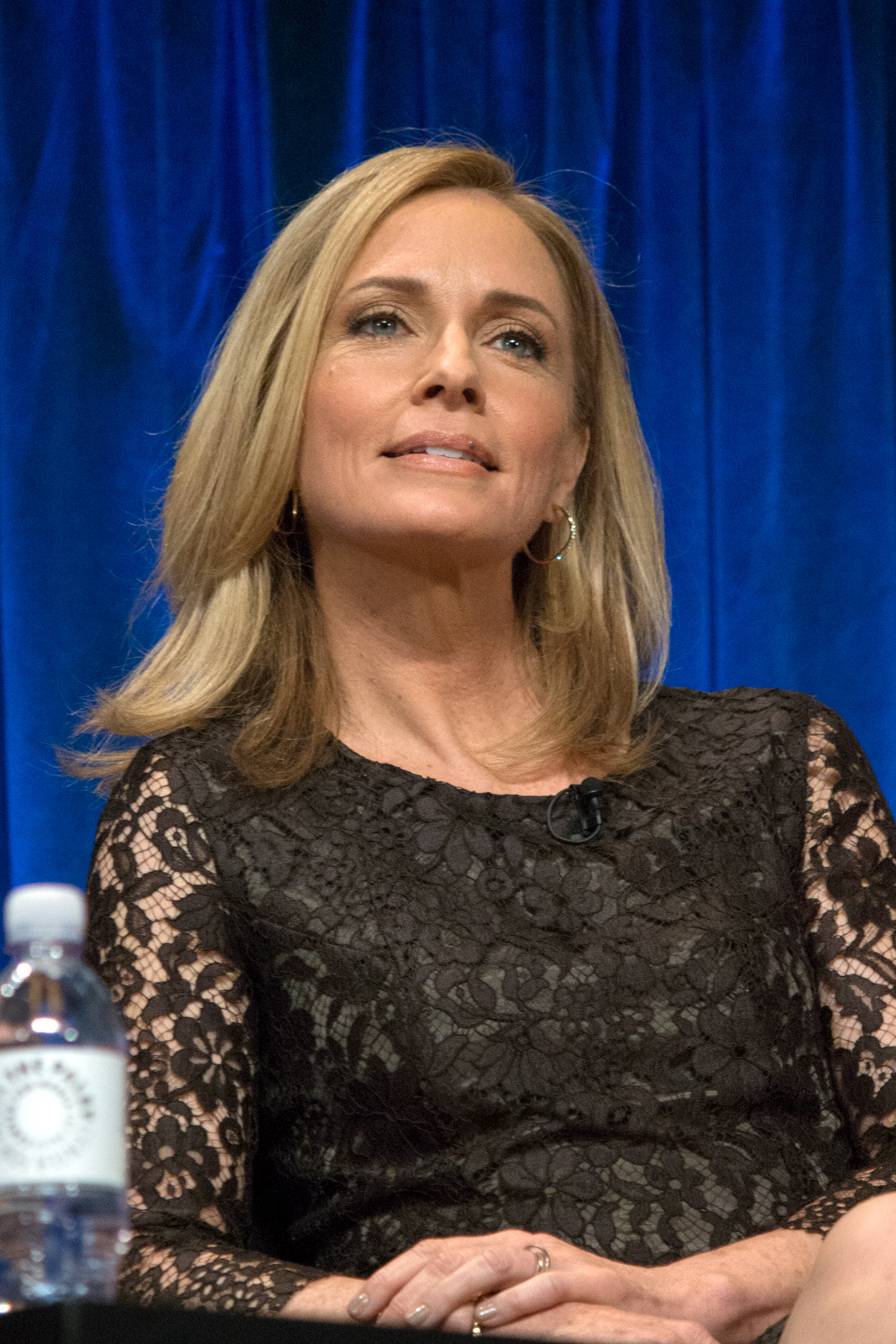
Actress Susanna Thompson was cast as the Borg Queen

In this episode, the crew of Starfleet's USS Voyager encounter the Borg "queen", a character introduced in the 1996 film Star Trek: First Contact. "Dark Frontier" goes deeper into the Borg story via Seven of Nine's human family, the Hansens.

Split into two parts, "Dark Frontier, Part I" was directed by Cliff Bole, and "Dark Frontier, Part II" was directed by Terry Windell. It was written by Brannon Braga and Joe Menosky. Although aired as a single feature, each section was shot on its own production schedule with a different director.

This episode is noted for a heist plot-device, in which Voyager plans to make off with Borg tech, and also for expanding the character story of Seven of Nine. In this episode, the role of the Borg Queen was played by Susanna Thompson rather than Alice Krige, who had played the role in the 1996 film Star Trek: First Contact. Thompson would return in this role for "Unimatrix Zero", with Krige reprising the role for the series finale "Endgame".

Seven of Nine's parents Magnus and Erin, are played by Kirk Baily and Laura Stepp, and a young Seven is played by Katelin Peterson.

The episode features VFX sequences with USS Voyager, the Delta Flyer, and the Borg Cubes.

The episode had original music written by David Bell.

The episode originally aired on UPN on February 17, 1999. However, it has two episode numbers 211 and 212 for the two-part version.

== Plot ==
On first airing, "Dark Frontier" aired as a single-length feature.

=== Part I ===
After Voyager manages to destroy a Borg probe by beaming a photon torpedo aboard, Seven of Nine finds data nodes filled with tactical information among the debris. With it they locate a heavily damaged sphere nearby, and Captain Janeway decides to plan a "heist" – invade the Borg vessel while its defenses are down and take its transwarp coil, which will shave about 20 years off Voyager's journey. The crew will create a diversion, then send an away team in to steal the technology. Hoping to find information that will give them a tactical edge, Janeway assigns Seven to study her parents' field notes that Voyager recovered from the Raven.

Once she begins studying her parents' logs, Seven remembers their encounters with the Borg. She was only a small girl at the time, but she vividly recalls their fascination with the mysterious Collective. Meanwhile, Voyager catches up with the sphere. The sphere's shields and transwarp drive will be offline for the next 72 hours, allowing the crew only a short time to plan and execute the mission.

During a holographic simulation, Janeway and the others practice their mission down to the second. They have only two minutes to find and extract the transwarp coil after the sensor grid aboard the Borg sphere is disabled. Their simulated mission fails when Janeway and her team take too long and the Borg regenerate their sensor grid and detect the intrusion. After leaving the holodeck, Seven is unsettled by her close proximity to the Borg, even if it was not real. When Naomi Wildman begins asking her questions about the Collective, the Borg accessed Seven's neural transceiver and she experiences a sensory perception that the borg know about Janeway's plan.

Further research of her parents' mission leads Seven to conclude that her parents underestimated the Borg, which eventually led to their assimilation. During this research, Seven discovers the Hansens' description of a bio-dampener in their notes, which they used to move around undetected in a Borg vessel while conducting their field research. The Voyager team replicates the technology for use in their raid on the Borg sphere. Asserting that she is willing to risk her own well-being for the sake of the crew, Seven persuades Janeway to assign her to the away team despite the Captain's reservations.

The mission goes as planned until Seven once again hears the voice of the Collective that Voyager won't be harmed if she returns to the hive. In a sudden change of heart, she refuses to transport back to Voyager with the others, and Janeway is forced to leave her before she is assimilated herself. The sphere returns to Borg space with Seven on board, and the Borg Queen welcomes her back to the Collective.

=== Part II ===
The Borg Queen informs Seven that the Borg "allowed" Voyager to liberate her from the Collective, but she will not be turned back into a drone because they want to study her memories. With her individuality intact, the Borg can look through her eyes to help them assimilate humanity. Meanwhile, Janeway discovers that Borg signals were being sent to Seven in her cargo bay alcove. Determined to rescue Seven, Janeway leads an away team in the Delta Flyer to find the Borg sphere that took Seven away. They use the stolen coil to take the shuttle into transwarp space, and incorporate multi-adaptive shielding based on the Hansens' field notes from the Raven to go undetected by the Borg.

As Seven is given her first assignment to assist in the assimilation of a species, she secretly helps four of the individuals escape. The Borg Queen scolds her, saying that her human emotions of compassion and guilt are weaknesses that are causing her pain. However, when Seven pleads with her to let the getaway ship escape, the Queen grants her request.

After the away team follows the sphere into Borg space, Janeway prepares to send a message to Seven through her Borg interplexing beacon. The Queen gives Seven a new assignment—to assist in the programming of nanoprobes that will assimilate humans. The Borg plan is to detonate a biogenic charge in Earth's atmosphere, and Seven will be turned into a drone if she does not comply. Taunting her, the Queen reveals that one of the drones standing next to her is Seven's father. Suddenly, Janeway's signal comes through, and the Queen discovers it.

As the Borg adapt to the Delta Flyer's shielding, Janeway is forced to beam to the vessel and deactivate the shield matrix around the Queen's chamber. While Paris eludes the other ships, Janeway confronts the Queen and orders Seven to leave with her. A dispersal field is formed around the chamber to block the Delta Flyer's transporter beam, but Seven tells the Captain to target the power node above the chamber. This disrupts the Queen's command interface, and Janeway and Seven are beamed to the shuttle. They quickly enter a transwarp conduit, but not before a Borg vessel sneaks in behind them. On Voyager, Chakotay orders Torres to fire a full spread of photon torpedoes at the conduit threshold, collapsing it just as the shuttle bursts through. The Borg ship is destroyed, and Seven is home again. Voyager uses the coil and gets 15 years closer to home before it burns out and is rendered useless.

== Background ==
The Borg were introduced on Star Trek: The Next Generation in the episode "Q Who?" (S2, E16), and also featured in the critically acclaimed episode "The Best of Both Worlds". They made a major influence on Voyager starting with "Scorpion", which introduced the ex-Borg character Seven of Nine to the main cast, and there were many Borg-centric episodes since that time in the show; they returned with a major story once again in "Dark Frontier". The Hansen Data archive that is a story point in "Dark Frontier" was acquired in the episode "The Raven".

== Reception ==
WhatCulture ranked this the 26th best episode of all time in the Star Trek science fiction universe. They praised this for mixing action and character development on Seven of Nine's quest for her humanity. i09 rated "Dark Frontier" as the 66th best episode of Star Trek up to that time.

In 2017, Netflix announced that "Dark Frontier" was one of six Star Trek: Voyager episodes (Note: Star Trek: Voyager was also represented on the list by "The Gift", "Time and Again", the feature length episode "Endgame", and both episodes in the two-part "Scorpion". When compiling its top ten list, Netflix purposely excluded the series premiere and second episode from each of the then-six series in the franchise, in order to "seek data beyond default behavior".) in the top ten most re-watched Star Trek franchise episodes on its streaming service, based on data since the franchise was added to Netflix in 2011.

Regarding the Borg, IGN ranked the Borg Queen featured in this episode as the 24th best character of all Star Trek to date. ScreenRant ranked "Dark Frontier" the eighth best episode with the Borg, based on an IMDB rating of 8.6 out ten. Juliette Harrisson writing for Den of Geek gave actress Susanna Thompson as Borg Queen an honorable mention in a ranking of best guest stars on Star Trek: Voyager, for her role in this episode and "Unimatrix" (Parts I & II). TV Guide named the Borg #4 in their list of the 60 Nastiest Villains of All Time. Screen Rant rated the Borg Cube as the second most deadly spacecraft of the Star Trek science fiction universe. The Borg cubes are rated as the second best spacecraft of Star Trek by Space.com.

Nerdist suggested watching "Dark Frontier" as part of an abbreviated binge-watching guide featuring USS Voyager's confrontations with the Borg. SyFy recommend "Dark Frontier" for their Seven of Nine binge-watching guide. Tom's Guide listed this as one of the best episodes for the character Seven of Nine (Jeri Ryan). Comic Book Resources highlighted "Dark Fontier" for Seven of Nine noting it was one of the "fascinating Borg-centric entries" along with "Infinite Regress" in season 5. CNET noted "Dark Frontier" as an exciting confrontation between Seven of Nine and the Borg. SyFy Wire ranked "Dark Frontier" as one of the seven essential episodes about Borg to watch as background for Star Trek: Picard.

This episode was evaluated in the book Gender and Sexuality in Star Trek: Allegories of Desire in the Television. They felt that in this episode women were part of the show's "epic narrative", and they evaluated based on such themes as woman in Hollywood and as an evolution of the character Kathryn Janeway. The episode was also noted for introducing a "dramatic energy" to the later seasons of the show's run, and introducing a struggle between the Borg queen and Captain Kathryn Janeway over Seven of Nine.

== Continuity ==
Actress Susanna Thompson would reprise her role as the Borg Queen for the "Unimatrix Zero" double episode, in 2000.

== Releases ==
Both parts of this episode "Dark Frontier" were released on LaserDisc in Japan on June 22, 2001, as part of 5th Season Vol. 2, which included episodes from "Dark Frontier" to "Equinox, Part I". The episode had two audio tracks, English and also Japanese. This set had six double sided 12" optical discs giving a total runtime of 552 minutes.

"Dark Frontier" was released on VHS cassette paired with "Unimatrix Zero, Part I".

Music for the episode was released on Compact Disc audio by Roldan Records.

On November 9, 2004, this episode was released as part of the season 5 DVD box set of Star Trek: Voyager. The box set includes 7 DVD optical discs with all the season 5 episodes, extra features, and a Dolby 5.1 Digital Audio track.

== See also ==
- Fort Knox (Captain Janeway used Fort Knox as a metaphor to explain the scale and the level of security around the transwarp coil they sought)
