= Flashback (Star Trek: Voyager) =

- Star Trek: Voyager episode
- Episode no.: Season 3 Episode 2
- Directed by: David Livingston
- Written by: Brannon Braga
- Cinematography by: Marvin V. Rush
- Production code: 145
- Original air date: September 11, 1996
- Running time: 45 minutes

Guest appearances
- Grace Lee Whitney – Janice Rand; Jeremy Roberts – Dimitri Valtane; Boris Krutonog – Excelsior Helmsman Lojur; Michael Ansara – Kang; George Takei – Hikaru Sulu

Episode chronology
← Previous "Basics, Part II"	Next → "The Chute"
- Star Trek: Voyager season 3

"Flashback" is the 44th episode of the American science fiction television series Star Trek: Voyager. It is the second episode of the third season. The episode aired on UPN on September 11, 1996.

The series follows the adventures of the Federation starship Voyager during its journey home to Earth, having been stranded tens of thousands of light-years away. In this episode, Captain Janeway must help Lt. Tuvok delve into his past to understand a memory triggered by the sight of a spatial phenomenon.

This episode was produced along with Star Trek: Deep Space Nine's "Trials and Tribble-ations" as part of the Star Trek franchise's 30th anniversary, with both series featuring characters from Star Trek: The Original Series; Hikaru Sulu (George Takei) and Janice Rand (Grace Lee Whitney) appear in this episode. Both characters appear by means of a flashback by Tuvok, taking place during the events depicted in the film Star Trek VI: The Undiscovered Country.

The episode was premiered the evening of August 9, 1996, at a convention held at the Britannia Hotel in Birmingham City Centre. The presentation was played from VHS tape.

== Plot ==
Investigating a nebula, Tuvok experiences a flashback of attempting to rescue a young girl off a cliff, then collapses. In Sickbay, he insists the cliff memory never occurred. The Doctor suggests the problem is a repressed memory, which in Vulcans can cause brain damage due to the conflict between the conscious and unconscious minds. He suggests Tuvok initiate a mind meld with a close friend to locate and reintegrate the memory. Tuvok chooses Janeway.

Tuvok initiates multiple mind melds, but instead of the cliff memory they appear in his memories aboard the USS Excelsior serving under Captain Sulu. In several instances the cliff memory resurfaces, rendering Tuvok unconscious. In one instance of the cliff memory, it is not a young Tuvok failing to rescue the girl, but a young Janeway. In Sickbay, the Doctor and Kes deduce the cliff flashback is a false memory created by a virus, and the virus has moved from Tuvok to Janeway. They kill the virus with thoron radiation.

Walking down a corridor, Janeway suggests that Tuvok missed those days serving under Sulu. Tuvok rejects this, but suggests that she could feel nostalgic for the both of them.

== Casting ==
This episode features The Original Series actors George Takei, Michael Ansara and Grace Lee Whitney.

== Production ==
In an example of discontinuity, the character of Lieutenant Dimitri Valtane, who appears in both this Voyager episode shot in 1996 and the 1991 feature film Star Trek VI: The Undiscovered Country, is shown to still be alive at the end of the feature film, in direct contradiction with the episode's depiction of events. Valtane is shown to have died in "Flashback", prior to the feature film's concluding scene in which the USS Excelsior captain and crew bid farewell to the USS Enterprise crew.

This episode was shot as a part of season two, but it was carried over and aired in season three.

== Reception ==
In 2015, a Star Trek: Voyager binge-watching guide by Wired magazine suggested this episode could not be skipped.

In 2016, The Hollywood Reporter rated "Flashback" the 86th-best episode of all Star Trek episodes.

In 2017, Den of Geek included this on their abbreviated watch guide for Star Trek: Voyager, picking out this episode on their cross-overs roadmap, noting The Original Series characters Hikaru Sulu, Kang and Janice Rand.

This episode may have been a response to the rumor mill's reports that fans might see a series following Sulu as he commands USS Excelsior, a ship that was previously featured in the film Star Trek VI: The Undiscovered Country (1991).

In 2017, Den of Geek noted this episode on their Star Trek: Voyager watching guide, pointing out this episode for its connections to other media in the Star Trek universe.

In July 2019, Screen Rant ranked "Flashback" as one of the top five episodes of the series.

In 2021, The Digital Fix said that it was appealing to see Takei reprise his character Sulu in this episode for the 30th anniversary.

== Novelization ==
A novel version of "Flashback" was written by Diane Carey, based on the Brannon Braga screenplay.

== Releases ==
The episode was premiered at the fan-run not-for-profit UK convention "Delta Quadrant" held at the Britannia Hotel in Birmingham City Centre in August 1996. The episode was first shown during the evening of August 9, 1996, from a VHS video cassette in the care of the convention's organiser Bob Hollocks.

"Flashback" was released on LaserDisc in Japan on June 25, 1999, as part of the 3rd season vol.1 set.

This episode was released with "Basics, Part II" on VHS in the United Kingdom, on one cassette, Star Trek: Voyager 3.1 - Basics, Part II/Flashback.

"Flashback" was released on DVD on July 6, 2004, as part of the 'Star Trek Voyager: Complete Third Season', with Dolby 5.1 surround audio.
