= Basics (Star Trek: Voyager) =

1996 American television episode

- Star Trek: Voyager episodes
- Episode nos.: Season 2 and 3 Episodes 26 and 1
- Directed by: Winrich Kolbe
- Written by: Michael Piller
- Cinematography by: Marvin V. Rush
- Production codes: 142 and 146
- Original air dates: May 20, 1996; September 4, 1996

Guest appearances
- Martha Hackett - Seska; Anthony De Longis - Culluh; Brad Dourif - Lon Suder; Henry Darrow - Kolopak; John Gegenhuber - Tierna; Nancy Hower - Ensign Samantha Wildman; Simon Billig - Hogan; Scott Haven - Kazon Engineer; Michael Bailey Smith - Alien; David Cowgil - Alien; John Kenton Shull - Medicine Man; Russ Faga - Paxim

Episode chronology
← Previous "Resolutions"	Next → "Flashback"

"Basics" comprises the 42nd and 43rd episodes of the science fiction television Star Trek: Voyager, the cliffhanger between the second season and the third season.

In this episode, the Federation starship Voyager, alone in the Delta Quadrant, is lured into a trap which leads to the ship being commandeered by the hostile Kazon, who forcibly remove the ship's crew to an inhospitable planet.

This was a two-part episode, but in two different seasons; Part I aired on May 20, 1996 as the finale of Season 2 and Part II aired on September 4, 1996 as the opener of Season 3. The show was originally broadcast on UPN in the United States.

Parts I and II were written by Michael Piller and directed by Winrich Kolbe.

These are the last two episodes of Star Trek written by Piller, who left the series after the second season as the day-to-day executive producer of the series. He would be credited as a Creative Consultant for the remainder of the series' run, though his last contribution to the franchise would be Star Trek: Insurrection two years later.

The episodes were also later released on VHS, LaserDisc, and DVD.

== Plot ==
=== Part I ===
Ensign Lon Suder, having been confined to his quarters for life as punishment for his murder of Crewman Darwin, has attempted to make amends by making several agricultural advancements. His homicidal tendencies seem to be well under control through the use of Vulcan mental disciplines learned from Tuvok. Seska calls Voyager stating that Commander Chakotay must rescue her and her newborn baby, since Culluh saw that the child was not his. Captain Janeway and Chakotay argue on whether or not to save his son, whether it is a trap or a real plea for help. In the ready-room, everyone thinks up ideas to fight the Kazon in the event of a trap.

An apparent defector of the Kazon is soon found on a stranded ship and taken on board to Sickbay, and explains his predicament, although Chakotay remains suspicious — especially when he mentions Seska's death. As Voyager travels further into Kazon space, facing heavier attacks that seem focused at the same general area of the ship, the man commits suicide in a violent explosion, which severely damages Suder's quarters and disables several of Voyager's systems. As Voyager is overwhelmed by the Kazon, Lt. Paris takes a shuttle to find a Talaxian colony for aid. Voyager is boarded and taken over by Kazon forces. Captain Janeway attempts to activate the ship's self-destruct sequence to prevent the Kazon from taking the ship, but the system that controls this ability was damaged in earlier Kazon skirmishes, revealing the true strategy of the Kazon.

=== Part II ===
The crew is marooned on a barren planet inhabited by primitive, hostile natives. Only two crew members are left on board Voyager, the Doctor and Suder, who was presumed dead in the explosion. It is revealed by the Doctor that Culluh, not Chakotay, is the father of Seska's baby. Suder hides in the vents and Jefferies tubes of the ship, having a crisis of conscience after he is forced to kill a Kazon soldier.

Meanwhile, on the planet, crewman Hogan is devoured by a gigantic serpent creature. (Note: The discovery of the crewman Hogan's remains by an alien species the Voth serves as a starting point for the plot of the later Voyager episode "Distant Origin" (Season 3 Episode 23).) The natives of the planet kidnap Kes and Neelix. Chakotay attempts to negotiate for their return, but this fails and he, Kes and Neelix are forced to hide in one of the caverns that the giant serpent lives in. The natives attempt to smoke them out with a fire.

Back at camp, Ensign Wildman's baby Naomi falls ill and Chakotay's team is still missing. Janeway gathers her own crew to search for Chakotay. Inside the caverns, a mis-step leads to a crew member being eaten by the serpent. Janeway has Lt. Torres and two others distract the natives. The diversion works, allowing them to extinguish the fire and save the rest of the crew. The serpent ends up buried under tons of rock dislodged by Tuvok and others as they escape.

Suder, accompanied by the Doctor, risks his life to repel the Kazon. Suder, under orders from Paris, attacks the engineering section of Voyager. He succeeds in sabotaging the ship's phasers, but is shot in the back by a dying Kazon and dies moments later. The Kazon then attempt to destroy Paris' shuttle but the sabotaged phasers overload, killing most of the Kazon and forcing them to abandon Voyager. Seska herself is mortally wounded; she stumbles into Janeway's ready room and dies next to her child, who survived. Maje Culluh takes the baby and leaves.

Volcanic eruptions on the planet have forced the Voyager crew and the natives to migrate together. Chakotay gains the respect of the natives when he rescues one of their children from a lava flow. The leader of the tribe gathers together plants that heal Naomi. The crew and the natives both watch in bewilderment as Voyager descends to the planet to pick them up. Tom Paris greets Janeway and the crew on the bridge and tells of Suder's bravery. In sickbay, Tuvok wishes that Suder may find the peace he could not in life. The natives wave farewell as Voyager departs.

== Notes ==
- Martha Hackett, whose character Seska is killed off this episode, received two copies of the script; the first where Seska survived, but her baby died and the second as was aired. She was only told that Seska was to die less than a day before filming. She would return to play the character twice more in the series.
- The first part of this episode contains a muffed line from Mulgrew (Janeway) that seemingly went unnoticed during production. When the character was supposed to say "work with The Doctor on it, B'Elanna" during a staff meeting, she instead said "work on The Doctor with it, B'Elanna".

== Reception ==
In 2017, ScreenRant rated "Basics" as the 6th most hopeful episode of Star Trek. They point out how the crew works together to survive despite the bleak situation they are placed in.

This episode was noted for Captain Janeway wearing her hair in a pony-tail style.

This marked the exit of Seska, a character that SyFy rated as among the top 21 most interesting supporting characters of Star Trek, and CBR ranked Seska the 18th best recurring character of Star Trek shows. CBR elaborate, "Martha Hackett was fantastic in the part, showcasing Seska’s transformation from supposedly loyal fighter to a scheming vixen."

In 2020, io9 listed "Basics" as one of the "must watch" episodes from the show.

In 2021, The Digital Fix praised the episode overall but was critical of the elimination of Suder and Seska. For example, they were pleased with the on-stage dynamic between actors Robert Picardo (The Doctor) and Dourif (Suder), and Suder's "redemptive" character arc, but lamented the exit of Suder. Likewise, they were happy with Seska, who they called the "most interesting reoccurring" character on the show and said her death was unnecessary.

== Releases ==
This episode was released on the United Kingdom on LaserDisc in April 1998. The 12 inch optical disc used both sides for 88 minutes of runtime in PAL format, and it retailed for £19.99.

Both parts of Basics were released in the U.K. paired with "Future's End" as "feature length adventures" on VHS (VHR 5071).

"Basics, Part I" was also released on VHS in the U.K. paired with "Resolutions". "Basics, Part II" was released with "Flashback" on VHS in the United Kingdom, on one cassette, Star Trek: Voyager 3.1 - Basics, Part II/Flashback.

"Basics, Part II" was released on DVD on July 6, 2004 as part of Star Trek Voyager: Complete Third Season, with a Dolby 5.1 surround.

In 2017, the complete Star Trek: Voyager television series was released in a DVD box set, this included "Basics, Part I" on Disc 7 with special features of that season at the end of season 2, and "Basics, Part II" as part of season 3.
