= Friendship One (Star Trek: Voyager) =

- Star Trek: Voyager episode
- Episode no.: Season 7 Episode 21
- Directed by: Mike Vejar
- Written by: Michael Taylor; Bryan Fuller
- Production code: 267
- Original air date: April 25, 2001

Guest appearances
- Josh Clark - Lt. Joe Carey; Ken Land - Verin; John Prosky - Otrin; Bari Hochwald - Brin; Peter Dennis - Admiral Hendricks; Ashley Edner - Yun; David Ghilardi - Alien Lieutenant; Heather Langone - Brin's Relative; John Rosenfeld - Technician #1; Wendy Speake - Technician #2

Episode chronology
← Previous "Author, Author"	Next → "Natural Law"
- Star Trek: Voyager season 7

"Friendship One" is the 167th episode of the science fiction television series, Star Trek: Voyager, the 21st episode of the seventh season. A 24th century spacecraft and its crew encounter a planet enduring a nuclear winter. The episode was written by Michael Taylor and Bryan Fuller and directed by Mike Vejar.

"Friendship One" aired on the United Paramount Network (UPN) on April 21, 2001.

== Plot ==
Enabled by its newfound method of regular communications with Starfleet in the Alpha Quadrant, U.S.S. Voyager is assigned its first official mission in the Delta Quadrant, to locate the space probe, Friendship 1, launched some centuries earlier, which Starfleet believes would be near Voyager's current position. The probe contained technologically advanced information for its time, such as instructions on how to build antimatter reactors and communication devices, in hopes to contact other species for peaceful communications.

Using historical data and their own updated star charts, Voyager tracks the probe to a planet that is suffering from nuclear winter. An away team takes the Delta Flyer to the surface to retrieve the probe. They find pieces of the probe, but before investigating further, Paris, Neelix, and Lt. Carey are kidnapped by humanoid beings. Chakotay and Kim return to the Flyer where they are attacked. They manage to stun the humanoid, but the shuttle is then attacked by anti-matter weapons. Chakotay orders the Flyer to return to Voyager as they cannot survive the barrage, with plans to return for the other three. Back on the ship, the Doctor treats the humanoid and restores him to consciousness. He states he is Otrin, one of the few survivors, and a scientist. He reports that when Friendship 1 landed on the planet, some of the population used the knowledge improperly, with the current nuclear winter caused by a failure in an anti-matter containment grid. Otrin warns that the three missing crewmembers are likely being held by Verin, leader of a group of survivors who have come to despise humans believing humans created the disaster on the planet and that Voyager is now here to conquer them. Seven of Nine offers the idea of using her nanoprobes to both cure the radiation poisoning that the population is suffering from, and to restore the atmosphere and end the nuclear winter. She tests her theory on Otrin, proving the idea viable.

Captain Janeway makes contact with Verin to negotiate. Verin demands that Voyager help to transfer the remaining population to a safe planet, a process that will take at least three years. Janeway believes this impractical, and instead offers to provide food and medicine for release of one of the hostages. Verin agrees, allowing Carey to be beamed back to the ship, but just as the transporter beam starts, Verin kills Carey. Janeway is shocked and relents to Verin's evacuation plan when he threatens to kill another hostage. Otrin realizes they may need someone besides Verin to speak for his people, and works with the Voyager crew to develop a plan. They successfully use the Doctor to disguise himself as one of Verin's people, allowing them to infiltrate their base, render the other captors unconscious, and free Paris and Neelix. Otrin takes over leadership from Verin, explaining Voyager's plan to restore their planet's environment.

With the Voyager crew returned and on Otrin's signal, they launch photon torpedoes that will explode in the atmosphere with the nanoprobes, which will start a chain reaction to restore the planet. The torpedoes cause a great deal of seismic activity, frightening Verin into a panic and causing him to try to initiate the planetary defense systems to destroy Voyager. Otrin and his people stop him in time. After the quakes have subsided, Otrin and his people look outside onto a beautiful sunny day, the signs of nuclear winter eradicated.

== Reception ==
SyFy Wire said this was the 19th best episode of Star Trek with Bryan Fuller writing credit, and said that it had an interesting premise but had a weak execution. In 2016, Den of Geek ranked it the 7th best Star Trek episode that Bryan Fuller wrote for, and said it "plays with several neat concepts."

== Home media releases ==
On December 21, 2003, this episode was released on DVD as part of a Season 7 boxset; Star Trek Voyager: Complete Seventh Season.
