= Bliss (Star Trek: Voyager) =

- Star Trek: Voyager episode
- Episode no.: Season 5 Episode 14
- Directed by: Cliff Bole
- Story by: Bill Prady
- Teleplay by: Robert J. Doherty
- Production code: 209
- Original air date: February 10, 1999

Guest appearances
- Scarlett Pomers - Naomi Wildman; W. Morgan Sheppard - Qatai; Marva Hicks - T'Pel

Episode chronology
← Previous "Gravity"	Next → "Dark Frontier"
- Star Trek: Voyager season 5

"Bliss" is the 108th episode of the science fiction television series Star Trek: Voyager, the 14th episode of the fifth season. Set in the 24th century, the Federation starship USS Voyager is stranded 50,000 light years from Earth on the other side of the Galaxy.

In this episode, Voyager becomes trapped in an enormous space dwelling "pitcher plant" while most of the crew believe they have discovered a possible way home, a wormhole back to Earth. Unaffected, Seven of Nine (Jeri Ryan) tries to find a way out of the creature.

This show was first aired on February 10, 1999 on the United Paramount Network (UPN).

== Plot ==
Crewmembers Seven of Nine and Ensign Tom Paris return to Voyager from an away mission with young Naomi Wildman. They soon learn that the crew believes they have found a wormhole leading directly back to Earth. Seven is immediately suspicious, and secretly reviews Captain Kathryn Janeway's logs. Janeway's earlier logs indicate finding a wormhole that was giving off deceptive readings; the later logs appear to dismiss those concerns, with Janeway directing the ship towards it without concern, believing Voyager to have obtained communications from Starfleet directing them through it.

Seven continues investigating the wormhole, but finds the crew blocking her efforts: the astrometrics lab is taken offline, supposedly to conserve power, and her communications with an alien named Qatai, warning them away from the anomaly, are cut short. Seven realizes she and Naomi are the only ones unenthusiastic about returning to Earth—Seven has no memory of Earth and Naomi has never seen it. The crew report continually receiving unbelievably upbeat and happy messages from Earth; Janeway's former fiancée has ended his engagement to another woman; Neelix is being made an ambassador, and Paris is offered a dream job. The Doctor agrees with Seven's assessment that the crew is being manipulated. The crew take The Doctor offline and attempt to place Seven into stasis, telling her it will prevent attracting the Borg with their passage. Seven evades them and erects a force field in engineering while attempting to halt the ship, but the crew knock Seven out.

Seven wakes to find that Voyager has entered the anomaly that appears to be a massive bio-organism digesting the ship's hull. The remaining crew have been knocked unconscious. Seven makes contact with Qatai, whose ship is also trapped inside the anomaly. Qatai reveals that they are inside a creature that telepathically tricks crews to enter it in order to consume their starships. He has been trying to destroy the creature for years since it killed his wife and family. After reactivating The Doctor, Seven and Qatai are able to force the creature to eject both ships by igniting some of Voyager's antimatter with Qatai's weapons. The plan appears to be effective, both ships free of the creature, but Qatai asserts they are still inside the creature, and that their escape is what Seven desired and the creature is influencing her mind. They repeat the procedure, and are successfully ejected.

Voyager's crew returns to consciousness and sets course to the Alpha Quadrant, first releasing a line of beacons to warn other vessels away from the creature. Qatai is seen sighing in his ship, observing the creature and considering his next move in his quest to destroy it.

== Production ==
The story came from a dream experienced by Bill Prady who at the time worked on the situation comedy series Dharma & Greg. The teleplay was written by Robert J. Doherty based on a story by Bill Prady. It was directed by Cliff Bole, who overall directed over two dozen episodes of the Franchise, including "Dark Frontier, Part I" (VOY) and famed episodes such as "Best of Both Worlds" (TNG).

== Reception ==
Jammer's Reviews gave "Bliss" a rating of 3 out of 4 stars and the summation "archetypes done entertainingly." While noting its many clichés and "general derivatives of derivatives" it is still, never-the-less, "'comfort' entertainment done well." Jamahl Epsicokhan sees the inspiration for the creature in "Bliss" coming from the huge "amoeba" in the Star Trek: The Original Series episode, "The Immunity Syndrome".

== Releases ==
On April 25, 2001, this episode was released on LaserDisc in Japan, as part of the half-season collection, 5th Season vol.1 . This included episodes from "Night" to "Bliss" on seven double sided 12 inch optical discs, with English and Japanese audio tracks for the episodes.

On November 9, 2004, this episode was released as part of the season 5 DVD box set of Star Trek: Voyager. The box set includes seven DVD optical discs with all the episodes in season 5 with some extra features, and episodes have a Dolby Digital 5.1 surround sound audio track.
