= Michael Taylor (screenwriter) =

American screenwriter

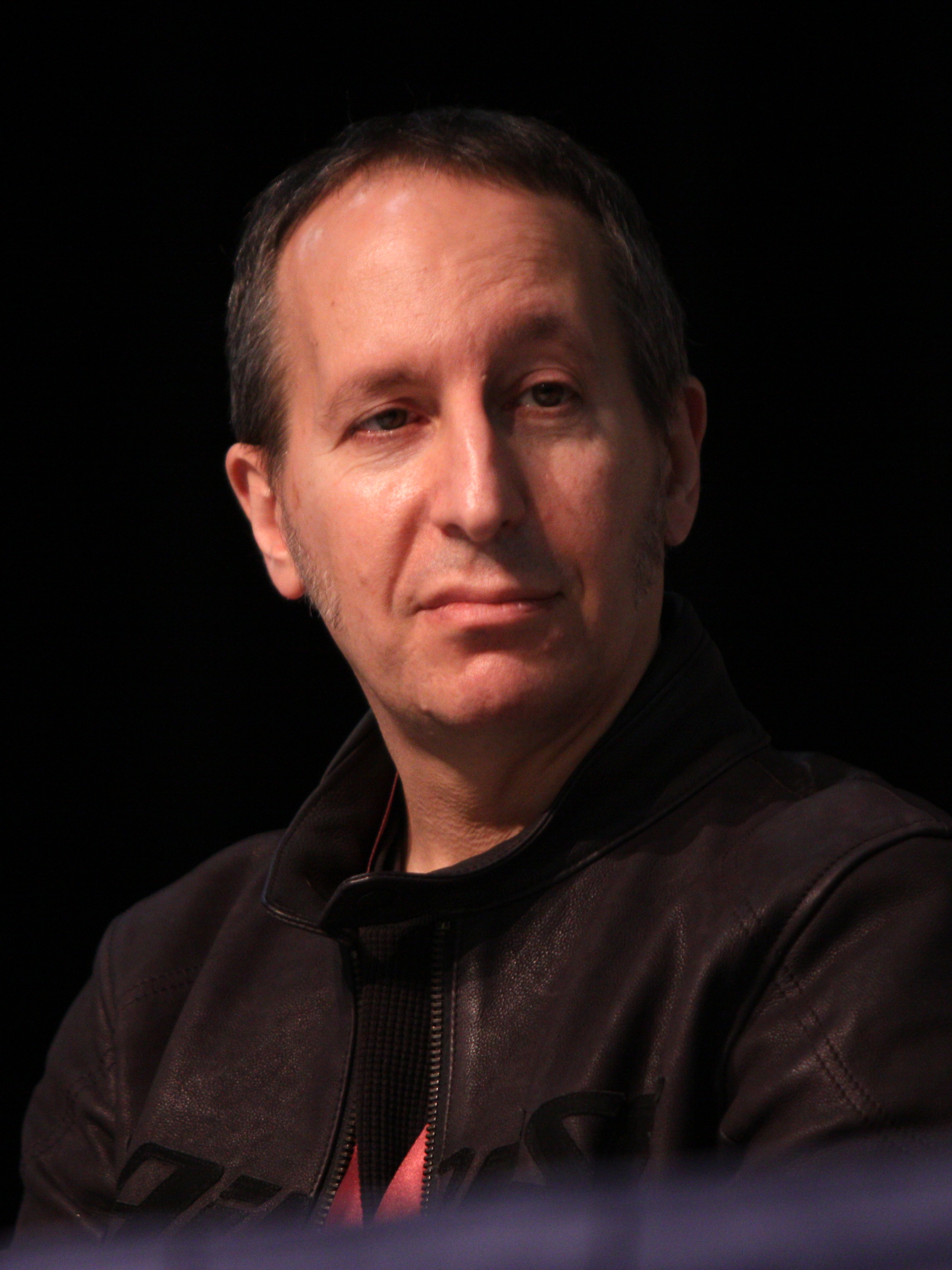
- Taylor speaking at the 2013 WonderCon at the Anaheim Convention Center in Anaheim, California
- Occupations: Screenwriter, Writer, Producer, Director
- Notable work: Star Trek: Deep Space Nine, Star Trek: Voyager

Michael Taylor (born February 15, 1969) is a screenwriter who is best known for his work as a writer for both Star Trek: Deep Space Nine and Star Trek: Voyager.

Taylor is a native New Yorker. He attended The Bronx High School of Science and Yale University. Taylor had a varied career prior to writing for television, including working as a newspaper and magazine reporter, as well as a musician who performed on guitar and sang with a rock band. He began his television work as a freelance writer for the Deep Space Nine, where he wrote one of the franchise's classic episodes, "The Visitor," while living in New York and still pursuing his musical interests. His other DS9 credits include the episodes "Things Past", "Resurrection" and "In the Pale Moonlight".

Taylor moved to Los Angeles to join the staff of Star Trek: Voyager during its final three seasons, writing many other memorable episodes.

Taylor's Voyager credits include:

- "The Fight"
- "Dragon's Teeth"
- "Blink of an Eye"
- "Body and Soul"
- "Bride of Chaotica!"
- "The Disease"
- "Think Tank"
- "Someone to Watch Over Me"
- "Relativity"
- "Warhead"
- "Alice"
- "One Small Step"
- "Collective"
- "Fury"
- "Shattered"
- "Workforce, Part II"
- "Once Upon a Time"
- "Counterpoint"
- "Drive"
- "Friendship One"

After Star Trek, he became a writer and producer on the USA Network series The Dead Zone, based on the science fiction thriller novel by Stephen King. In 2002, Michael Taylor was nominated for a Nebula Award, which is given by the Science Fiction and Fantasy Writers of America, for writing the Dead Zone episode entitled "Unreasonable Doubt".

After five seasons on The Dead Zone, Taylor joined the Syfy channel's and Ronald D. Moore's Battlestar Galactica as a co-executive producer and wrote the Battlestar TV movie Razor. When Battlestar ended its four-season run, he became a writer and co-executive producer on its spin-off, Caprica, as well as a writer and executive producer of the FOX pilot/TV movie Virtuality, co-created with Ron Moore.

His Caprica credits include: "Ghost in the Machine", "End of Line" and "False Labor".

Taylor subsequently co-created the Syfy series Defiance, and wrote and produced the Battlestar prequel web series and TV movie Blood & Chrome, before "turning" to historical fiction as a writer and executive producer on the acclaimed AMC series Turn: Washington's Spies. He returned to science fiction as a writer and executive producer on two more AMC series: the gonzo, post-apocalyptic martial arts show, Into the Badlands, and Pantheon, an animated sci-fi series expected to air in 2022.

Taylor's work has been nominated several times for both Hugo and Nebula Awards. He won a Peabody Award as part of the writing staff of Battlestar Galactica, and a webisode series he wrote, "Battlestar Galactica: Razor Flashbacks", garnered an Emmy® Award for Best Short Format Live-Action Entertainment Program.

In his spare time, Taylor continues to play music with Trainwreck, a cover band of fellow writers.
