= Bride of Chaotica! =

- Star Trek: Voyager episode
- Episode no.: Season 5 Episode 12
- Directed by: Allan Kroeker
- Story by: Bryan Fuller
- Teleplay by: Bryan Fuller; Michael Taylor
- Cinematography by: Marvin V. Rush
- Production code: 207
- Original air date: January 27, 1999

Guest appearances
- Martin Rayner - Dr. Chaotica; Nicholas Worth - Lonzak; Paul F. O'Brien - Geral; Jim Krestalude - Alien; Tarik Ergin - Satan's Robot (uncredited; voice dubbed); Kirsten Turner - Constance Goodheart

Episode chronology
← Previous "Latent Image"	Next → "Gravity"
- Star Trek: Voyager season 5

"Bride of Chaotica!" is the 106th episode of the American science fiction television series Star Trek: Voyager airing on the UPN network, the 12th episode of the fifth season. The episode originally aired on January 27, 1999. The episode largely takes place on the holodeck, which is running a holo-program in black and white instead of the usual color. A small fire to the Bridge set had occurred while the episode was in production; as a result the Bridge scenes were shot weeks later after the set was repaired and scenes that were originally set for the Bridge were either entirely rewritten or set on a different part of the ship. The episode satirizes numerous elements of the classic 1936 film serial Flash Gordon and classic 1939 film serial Buck Rogers.

In this episode, Voyager becomes stuck in a interdimensional rift as photonic beings from another dimension attempt first contact in the holodeck, meeting the photonic villains of Ensign Paris' "Captain Proton" program, who promptly attack them.

== Plot ==
During an episode of The Adventures of Captain Proton on the holodeck in a recurring Voyager hologram program in the style of vintage movie serials such as Flash Gordon and Buck Rogers, Ensigns Tom Paris and Harry Kim are forced to leave the program running when spatial distortions trap the ship and disrupt their control over the computer. While the command staff of Voyager seek to discover a way to free the ship from the spatial distortions, extra-dimensional aliens, who exist in a photonic state, cross from their dimension through a distortion in the holodeck. They are detected and attacked by the bombastic villain Dr. Chaotica, who believes them to be invaders from the fifth dimension, and whose holographic deathray — though harmless to humans — is deadly to the photonic aliens.

Eventually, the crew discover the war being waged between Chaotica and the photonic aliens and must defeat him by playing out their roles as the fictional Captain Proton (Tom Paris), his sidekick Buster Kincaid (Harry Kim), the President of Earth (the Doctor, who is a photonic being), and Arachnia, Queen of the Spider People - a campy space queen who is destined to be Chaotica's bride. Paris asks Captain Janeway to take on the role of femme fatale Queen Arachnia. Mortified, she refuses such an indignity, but reluctantly agrees to help Voyager out of its predicament.

Inside the holodeck in full costume, Janeway, as Queen Arachnia, attempts to use her charms to manipulate Chaotica into lowering the "lightning shield" that protects his fortress under the pretence that her loyal subjects in their "spider ships" want to pay homage to Chaotica. He agrees to do so only after she becomes his bride and have been wed. Eventually Chaotica becomes aware of Arachnia’s duplicity when she attempts to deactivate the shields herself. Chaotica then traps her in his "confinement rings" (force field) for double crossing him and gleefully tells her he will kill her after their wedding night. Using a vial of her "spider pheromones", Arachnia hypnotizes Chaotica's head minion and charms him into freeing her. She then forces Chaotica to deactivate the lightning shield thus enabling Captain Proton to fire his "destructo beam" hitting both the death ray and mortally wounding Chaotica, who monologues till he dies. Freed, Voyager continues on the journey home, Chaotica fiendishly cackling in the background over a title card reading "The End?"

== Reception ==
In 2012, Den of Geek ranked "Bride of Chaotica!" as the fifth best episode of Star Trek: Voyager.

In 2014, io9 ranked "Bride of Chaotica!" as the 100th out of 100 of the best of over 700 episodes across the entire Star Trek television franchise. In 2019, Comic Book Resources rated "Bride of Chaotica!" as the second most funny episode of all Star Trek.

Dany Roth writing for SyFy Wire in 2017, ranked this the 3rd best episode that Bryan Fuller wrote for; they felt "It's campy, hilarious, hysterical, brilliant, and an absolute joy" and said it might be the best holodeck episode.

In 2019, CBR ranked "Bride of Chaotica!" as the best holodeck episode of all Star Trek. In 2021, they highlighted this episode as an example of the series "having fun with its goofier side"

In 2021, Tor.com rated this 10 out 10, remarking "This is simply an enjoyable episode of Star Trek" despite some misgiving about it making sense, and commending Mulgrew for a "stupendous performance."

== Releases ==
On April 25, 2001, this episode was released on LaserDisc in Japan, as part of the half-season collection, 5th Season vol.1 . This included episodes from "Night" to "Bliss" on seven double sided 12 inch optical discs, with English and Japanese audio tracks for the episodes.

On November 9, 2004, this episode was released as part of the season 5 DVD box set of Star Trek: Voyager. The box set includes seven DVD optical discs with all the episodes in season 5 with some extra features, and episodes have a Dolby Digital 5.1 surround sound audio track.
