= Cliff Bole =

American television director (1937–2014)

- Born: Clifford John Bole; November 9, 1937; San Francisco, California, US
- Died: February 15, 2014 (aged 76); Palm Desert, California, US
- Occupation: Television director
- Years active: 1975–2007
- Notable work: 42 episodes of the Star Trek franchise
- Awards: Golden Palm Star

Clifford John Bole (November 9, 1937 – February 15, 2014) was a director of a number of American and Canadian television programs. He directed episodes of The Six Million Dollar Man, The Amazing Spider-Man, Vegas, Charlie's Angels, V: The Series, Baywatch, The X-Files, Star Trek: The Next Generation, Star Trek: Deep Space Nine, and Star Trek: Voyager among others. The Star Trek alien race called the Bolians is named after him.

== Career ==
Bole grew up in the San Fernando Valley and described himself as a "set rat", sneaking into studio backlots to watch the filming taking place. He went on to train as a script clerk and as a production assistant before moving into directing. One of his earlier roles was as script supervisor on McHale's Navy in 1964.

Bole is perhaps best known for his directing work in the Star Trek franchise which began with the first season episode "Lonely Among Us" of Star Trek: The Next Generation. He went on to direct a further 24 episodes of that series, as well as seven episodes of Star Trek: Deep Space Nine and ten episodes of Star Trek: Voyager. He was originally referred to the TNG production team by colleague Jeff Hayes, although Bole knew producer Rick Berman from when they both worked at Warner Brothers. Bole directed the TNG episode "Conspiracy", which featured the first appearance of the alien race called the Bolians, who were named after Bole. He subsequently described working on The Next Generation as "the biggest joy and ensemble I've ever worked with".

His work on Deep Space Nine was delayed following a disagreement with Michael Piller over working practices. However, his first directing position in that series was in the 18th episode, "Dramatis Personae". He had previously worked with Avery Brooks, who played Hawk on Spenser: For Hire. His recollection of working on Deep Space Nine wasn't as warm as The Next Generation, but Voyager was more similar to the earlier Star Trek series. Rick Berman brought him in for Voyager, which resulted in Bole directing, amongst others, "The Q and the Grey", one of the best-received episodes of Voyager. His final episode for Voyager and the franchise was the first part of the feature length episode "Dark Frontier".

Bole was recognized with a Golden Palm Star on the Palm Springs, California Walk of Stars at 255 South Palm Canyon Drive in 2005.

He died at his home in Palm Desert, California on February 15, 2014.

== Selected filmography ==
- The Six Million Dollar Man (12 episodes)
- Charlie's Angels (6 episodes)
- Vega$ (12 episodes)
- Strike Force (4 episodes)
- Fantasy Island (20 episodes)
- Matt Houston (9 episodes)
- V (3 episodes)
- T.J. Hooker (17 episodes)
- Scarecrow and Mrs. King (4 episodes)
- Spenser: For Hire (3 episodes)
- MacGyver (16 episodes)
- Mission: Impossible (1988) (3 episodes)
- Paradise (4 episodes)
- Star Trek: The Next Generation (25 episodes)
- Baywatch (5 episodes)
- Pointman (2 episodes)
- Star Trek: Deep Space Nine (7 episodes)
- M.A.N.T.I.S. (3 episodes)
- Star Trek: Voyager (10 episodes)
- The X-Files (4 episodes)
