= Tuvok =

Fictional character in Star Trek: Voyager

- Star Trek character
- First appearance: "Caretaker" (1995) (Star Trek: Voyager)
- Last appearance: "The Last Generation" (2023) (Star Trek: Picard)
- Portrayed by: Tim Russ

In-universe information
- Species: Vulcan
- Affiliation: United Federation of Planets; Starfleet
- Spouse: T'Pel
- Children: 4
- Posting: USS Excelsior NCC-2000 as Junior Science Officer; USS Voyager as Second Officer, Tactical Officer and Chief of Security; USS Titan as Second Officer and Tactical Officer; Federation Spy on Val Jean
- Rank: Ensign; Lieutenant (seasons 1–4); Lieutenant Commander (seasons 4–7); Commander; Captain

Tuvok /ˈtuːvɒk/ is a fictional character in the Star Trek media franchise and a main character in the television series Star Trek: Voyager. Tuvok is a Vulcan who serves as the ship's second officer, Chief of Security, and Chief Tactical Officer. He was portrayed by Tim Russ throughout the show's run from 1995 to 2001, as well as in subsequent portrayals.

Tuvok's backstory is told during the first episode of Voyager, where he worked as an undercover Federation agent aboard a Maquis ship, the Val Jean, led by Chakotay. The starship Voyager, under the command of Captain Kathryn Janeway, is sent to extract Tuvok, but the mission is interrupted as both ships are catapulted across the galaxy by a mysterious force. Janeway leads both crews on a return trip home for seven years in uncharted space, creating the basic setting of the series.

== Overview ==
Over the course of the seven seasons of Voyager, Tuvok's character and backstory are revealed. The show follows from a narrative established in the Star Trek universe by Star Trek: Deep Space Nine and Star Trek: The Next Generation. Star Trek: Voyager was released concurrently with the later episodes of Star Trek: Deep Space Nine.

After the ships Voyager and Val Jean become lost in the Delta Quadrant, an extra-galactic alien known as the Caretaker uses the crews for medical experiments, the ship Val Jean is destroyed, and a number of people are killed, including many senior officers aboard Voyager. Tuvok rejoins the crew of the Voyager and the former Maquis are taken aboard as they try to make their way back to Earth. Due to the limitations of the ship's warp drive, it will take decades to return to Earth. Tuvok will be instrumental in many episodes as a fully trained Starfleet officer, possessing many talents like the Vulcan mind meld.

In the episode "Alice", Harry Kim and Tom Paris attempt to guess Tuvok's age; they incorrectly guess at 162 and 133 respectively. Later that season, in the episode "Fury", Captain Janeway discovers the date of Tuvok's birth and tells him, "It's not long before you hit the big three digits", which suggests that he was under 100 at the time of the episode.

As a teenager, portrayed in flashback sequences during "Gravity", Tuvok is revealed to have fallen in love with a girl named Jara. When Jara did not return his affections, Tuvok's jealousy caused him to be expelled from school and resulted in his parents sending him to a Vulcan master to learn emotional control.

Tuvok attended Starfleet Academy in San Francisco. Upon graduation, he was commissioned an ensign at age 29, serving as a junior science officer on the USS Excelsior, under Captain Hikaru Sulu as seen in the episode "Flashback".

During his early service with Starfleet, Tuvok became increasingly uncomfortable associating with non-Vulcans, which led him to resign his Starfleet commission in 2298. During this hiatus, he married a woman named T'Pel. Fifty years later, Tuvok rejoined Starfleet as a training instructor at Starfleet Academy. His return to Starfleet was marked by a maturity and a reconsideration of the benefits that service provided.

After a few years teaching cadets, Tuvok was briefly assigned to the USS Billings with Janeway, until both Janeway and Tuvok were assigned to the USS Wyoming and then the Intrepid-class starship USS Voyager.

In 2371, Tuvok was assigned to infiltrate the Maquis organization aboard Chakotay's vessel. In "Repression", it was revealed that, during the infiltration mission, Tuvok's identity was uncovered by a Maquis counter-intelligence agent, Teero Anaydis (Keith Szarabajka), who used Tuvok for mind-control experiments. Although Tuvok was conscious throughout the experiments, Teero wiped his memory later on. Following the ordeal, Tuvok was released as a sleeper agent. He was later "activated" by a message hidden in a letter from his son.

During the episode "Tuvix", a transporter accident fused Tuvok and a Delta Quadrant native called Neelix together into a new humanoid, appropriately named Tuvix. They were eventually restored to their individual forms under the orders of Captain Janeway using a procedure devised by The Doctor. Tuvok was generally unfriendly towards Neelix, as seen in the episode "Riddles". The two eventually became friends, though more reservedly on Tuvok's part.

At the opening of the fourth season episode "Revulsion", Tuvok was promoted to the rank of lieutenant commander. Before this, he was referred to as "lieutenant" despite sometimes wearing lieutenant commander rank insignia.

It is revealed during "Endgame", the final episode of the series, that Tuvok suffers from a degenerative neurological disease, which can only be cured by undergoing a mind meld with a family member. In 2377, he was still healthy to perform his duties. However, in his elderly years, in an alternate timeline, the disease finally ravaged Tuvok's mind since he was unable to return to the Alpha Quadrant in time for a cure. This left him confined in a mental asylum. To save Tuvok, Captain Janeway's future self changed history by finding a way to return the Voyager to the Alpha Quadrant before his disease worsened. In the novelization of "Endgame", Tuvok's eldest son Sek arrives aboard Voyager and performs the required mind meld, curing Tuvok.

In Star Trek: Picard, a Changeling impersonates Tuvok, who by 2401 is a Starfleet captain. In the series finale, the real Tuvok is rescued following the destruction of the Borg and the exposure of the Changeling infiltrators. Meeting with Seven of Nine after his rescue, Tuvok promotes her to Captain of the rechristened Enterprise-G.

== Personality ==
A full Vulcan, Tuvok has a complex personality, with internal conflict. It is suggested that he never entirely gained emotional control, and that he feels bitterness over his Vulcan heritage. He is also shown to exhibit subdued moments of annoyance, self-doubt, sarcasm and even anger, mostly directed towards Neelix, whose gregarious personality is often at odds with Tuvok's Vulcan stoicism.

== Relationships ==
Tuvok is married to T'Pel. They married in 2304. They have three sons (one of whom is named Sek) and one daughter named Asil. T'Pel is featured in the Voyager episodes "Persistence of Vision" and "Bliss," both times when Tuvok is hallucinating, and a holographic version of her is featured in "Body and Soul." She is played by actress Marva Hicks. His son Sek is played by Ronald Robinson and is seen in a video message from home in "Repression" (S7E4).

== Other portrayals ==
The mirror universe Tuvok appears in the Star Trek: Deep Space Nine third-season episode "Through the Looking Glass" as a member of the Terran Rebellion. He is the only Voyager character whose mirror universe counterpart appears onscreen.

In the non-canon Star Trek: Titan novel series, Tuvok joins William Riker on the USS Titan as tactical officer, leaving Voyager. His wife joins him. In 2008, Tim Russ brought back Tuvok in the fan film project, Star Trek: Of Gods and Men joining a cast of several Star Trek actors from various series. In 2015, Tim Russ again reprised the role of Tuvok in the fan series, Star Trek: Renegades as head of Section 31 alongside Walter Koenig portraying the ST:TOS character of Pavel Chekov.

In the MMORPG video game Star Trek Online, Tim Russ provides voice acting for the character of Tuvok, who plays a major role in the Species 8472 quest line. In that quest line, Tuvok has been promoted to Admiral and given command of USS Voyager.

== Reception ==
In 2018, TheWrap ranked Tuvok as the 23rd-best character of Star Trek overall, noting a character that struggled with deep emotions yet remained a loyal and disciplined friend.

In 2021, Variety said that Tuvok was "simply amazing" and praising actor Tim Russ's presentation of the character as "brilliant."
