= Jimmy Diggs =

American television screenwriter

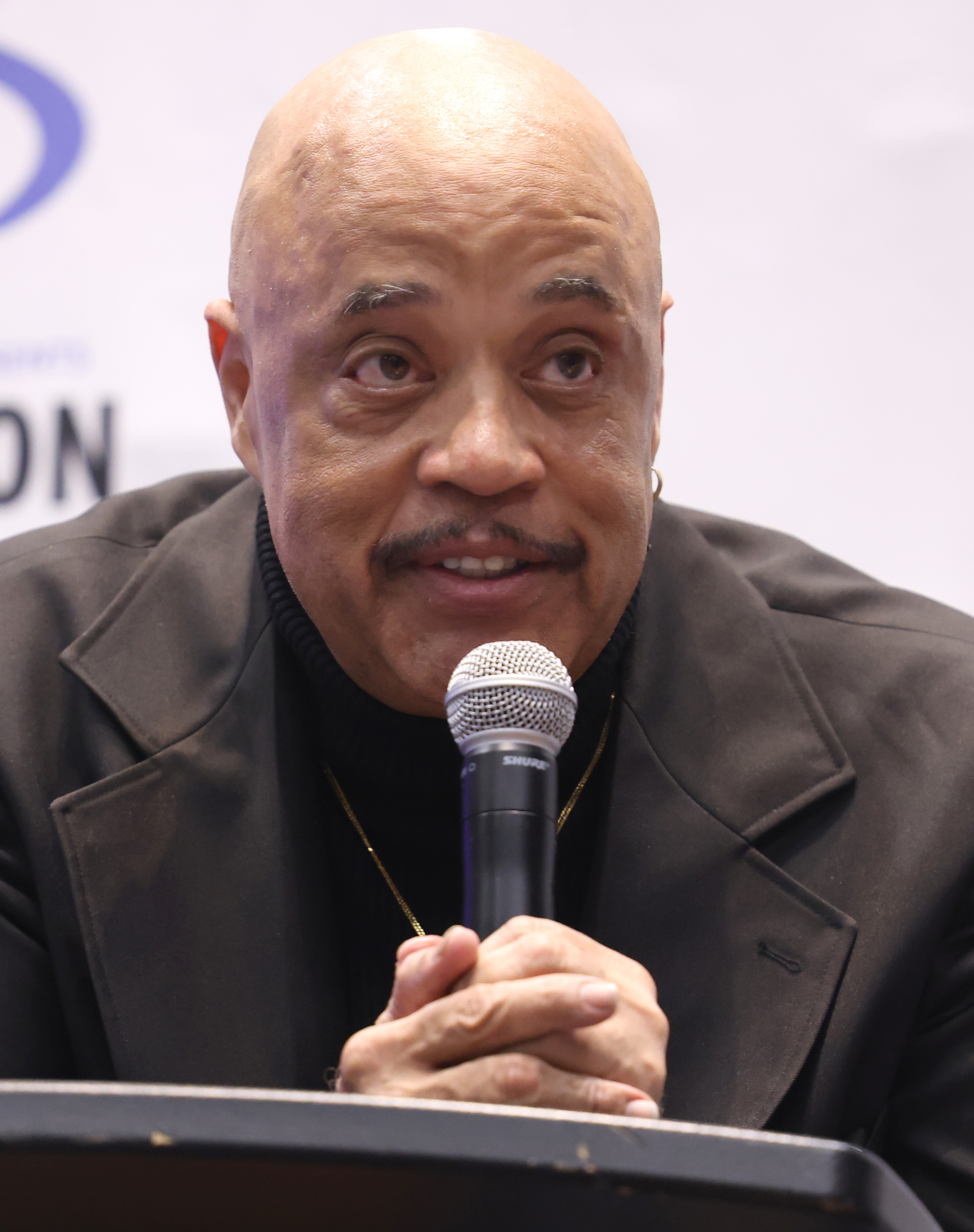
- Diggs in 2025
- Born: September 2, 1955 (age 70); Detroit, Michigan
- Occupations: Screenwriter and actor

Jimmy Diggs (born September 2, 1955) is an American television screenwriter best known for writing the stories for a combined seven episodes of Star Trek: Deep Space Nine and Star Trek: Voyager. This is more episodes than any other freelance writer in the 40+ year history of the Star Trek franchise.

A Vietnam veteran, Diggs was a security guard for a Hollywood studio when Renegade producer Nicholas Corea, who knew Diggs also wrote science fiction, asked him for a story pitch. The studio bought the story and launched his career in television writing. Diggs operates his own production company, House of Diggs Productions.

Diggs also does some acting. He has appeared in small roles in a 2003 episode of Renegade, plus the films Hole in One (2010) and Beach Bar: The Movie (2011), each time as a security guard or bodyguard.

Diggs served in the United States Navy in the Vietnam War.
