= Terry Windell =

American film director

Terry Windell (1956–2018) was an American director of television commercials and long-form television, as well as a background artist and effects animator for feature films. He directed several episodes of Star Trek: Voyager and Enterprise.

== Career ==
While working as a background artist on Heavy Metal, Terry caught the attention of Industrial Light & Magic. The company hired him and he began work as an effects animator on both Poltergeist and E.T.: The Extra Terrestrial. While there, Terry worked under the wing of Richard Edlund, who placed him on the effects teams for Return of the Jedi. He would later serve as animation supervisor for Ghostbusters, 2010, Fright Night and Poltergeist II.

When Edlund left to create Boss Films, Windell followed. It was at this time that Terry began to set his sights on live-action directing. In 1989, he debuted with a four spot campaign for DHL. The impressive effects-laden spots garnered numerous honors including a Silver Clio and a New York Film Festival award in the Best Campaign category. Terry went on to direct several other Clio winning campaigns while at Boss. When the company closed its commercial production division, Windell made the move to A Band Apart, helmed by Quentin Tarantino and Lawrence Bender.

Windell directed over 120 commercials, including numerous Clio, Addy and Mobius award-winning spots for Geo Prism, Dodge, United Airlines and a 14-spot Bud Bowl package.

== Death ==
On July 23, 2018, the official Facebook page for Cleanin' Up the Town: Remembering Ghostbusters announced that Windell had died.
