= Drone (Star Trek: Voyager) =

- Star Trek: Voyager episode
- Episode no.: Season 5 Episode 2
- Directed by: Les Landau
- Story by: Bryan Fuller; Harry 'Doc' Kloor
- Teleplay by: Bryan Fuller; Brannon Braga; Joe Menosky
- Production code: 196
- Original air date: October 21, 1998

Guest appearances
- J. Paul Boehmer – One; Todd Babcock – Ens. Mulcahey

Episode chronology
← Previous "Night"	Next → "Extreme Risk"
- Star Trek: Voyager season 5

"Drone" is the 96th episode of the science fiction television series Star Trek: Voyager, the second episode of the fifth season. The crew of the 24th-century spacecraft USS Voyager deal with a Borg drone, played by guest star J. Paul Boehmer.

This episode originally aired on UPN on October 21, 1998.

== Plot ==
A small team from Voyager, including Seven of Nine and the Doctor, are performing a survey of a proto-nebula. When the nebula becomes unstable, the team is transported to the ship, but a malfunction briefly merges their patterns together. The Doctor finds his mobile emitter is failing, and he is returned to sickbay while Lt. B'Elanna Torres takes the emitter to the science lab for repair. The crew is unaware that the emitter has gained some of Seven's Borg nanoprobes from the malfunctioning transporter, and it begins assimilating the equipment in the science lab.

The crew soon detects a large power draw from the lab, and discover that the nanoprobes have constructed a Borg maturation chamber, rapidly growing a Borg drone. They determine that the components of the drone are based on the advanced 29th-century technology of the emitter; should the Borg of this century gain that technology, the entire galaxy is doomed. Captain Janeway decides to allow the drone to mature, hoping to make it understand humanity's individualism once it is born.

The drone (J. Paul Boehmer) soon leaves the maturation chamber, and though it immediately attempts to seek out the Borg collective, Seven tries to convince him that he is an individual. Several of the crew help the drone to integrate, purposely omitting information about the Borg collective, and soon the drone appears adapted to being an individual, requesting to be named "One".

Through the action of his nanoprobes, One involuntarily sends a signal to the Borg collective, and a Borg ship closes in on Voyager. Seven gives One a crash course on the Borg collective, and though One is fascinated by it, Seven asserts that she considers the Voyager crew her collective. One helps the crew enhance their shields and weapons, but the battle is still a losing one. One transports to the Borg ship and overrides the controls, sending the ship into the proto-nebula where it is destroyed.

The crew detects a life sign, and finds One is still alive but in critical condition. He is rushed to sickbay, but refuses treatment, explaining that now that the Borg know of him they will pursue Voyager endlessly to assimilate him. He assures the emotional Seven that she will adapt once he passes away.

== Background ==
The Borg are a Star Trek villain species famous for their phrase, "Resistance is futile." TV Guide named the Borg #4 in its 2013 list of the 60 Nastiest Villains of All Time. The Borg were introduced on Star Trek: The Next Generation in the episode "Q Who?" (S2E16) and also featured in the critically acclaimed episode "The Best of Both Worlds". They made a major influence on Voyager starting with "Scorpion", which introduced the ex-Borg character Seven of Nine to the main cast, and there were many subsequent Borg-centric episodes.

== Reception ==
In 2016, SyFy Wire ranked "Drone" the fourth-best episode Bryan Fuller wrote for, and felt it was similar in some ways to the Star Trek: The Next Generation episode "The Offspring"; they considered the finale "powerfully poignant".

In 2017, Den of Geek rated "Drone" among their top 50 Star Trek episodes. Jammer's Reviews site gave it 4 out of 4 stars. In 2017, Den of Geek ranked actor J. Paul Boehmer as 'One', as the third-best guest star on Star Trek: Voyager.

SyFy recommends "Drone" for their Seven of Nine binge-watching guide.

In 2019, Nerdist suggested watching this episode as part of an abbreviated binge-watching guide featuring USS Voyager's confrontations with the Borg.

In 2020, io9 listed this episode as one of the "must watch" episodes from season five of the show.

== Connections ==
A listing of Star Trek franchise Borg-centric episodes placed "Drone" between "The Raven" (S4E6) and "Dark Frontier" (S5E15 & S5E16) in the Star Trek timeline.

== Releases ==
On November 9, 2004, "Drone" was released as part of the Season 5 DVD box set of Star Trek: Voyager. The seven-DVD set includes extra features, and the episodes have Dolby 5.1 Digital Audio tracks.

On April 25, 2001, the episode was released on LaserDisc in Japan as part of the half-season collection, 5th Season vol.1. It included episodes from "Night" to "Bliss" on seven double-sided 12-inch optical discs, with English and Japanese audio tracks for the episodes.

== See also ==
- "The Abandoned" from Star Trek: Deep Space Nine
- "I, Borg" from Star Trek: The Next Generation
