= Revulsion (Star Trek: Voyager) =

- Star Trek: Voyager episode
- Episode no.: Season 4 Episode 5
- Directed by: Kenneth Biller
- Written by: Lisa Klink
- Production code: 173
- Original air date: October 1, 1997

Guest appearance
- Leland Orser - Dejaren

Episode chronology
← Previous "Nemesis"	Next → "The Raven"
- Star Trek: Voyager season 4

"Revulsion" is the 73rd episode of Star Trek: Voyager, the fifth episode of the fourth season. The episode aired on UPN on October 1, 1997. This is focused on an EMH (Emergency Medical Hologram; The Doctor)-like hologram on another ship, which is dealt with mostly by the Doctor and B'Elanna. Guest star Leland Orser plays the hologram, Dejaren, on a spaceship that is encountered by Voyager. Leland Orser had also played a character on Deep Space Nine.

== Plot ==
The crew is sitting in the mess hall for a celebration in honor of Tuvok, who is promoted to lieutenant commander. After the party, Tom Paris catches up with B'Elanna Torres. The two haven't talked since the incident with the warp core three days before, and Tom decides to make a move. B'Elanna confirms that she meant what she said when she confessed her love for him, and Tom accepts this with a kiss.

Shortly after the party ends, Voyager receives a distress call, sent by Dejaren — a hologram with artificial intelligence alone aboard a ship. His six flesh-and-blood crewmates have been killed and he requests assistance. The Doctor is eager to meet a fellow hologram and he and B'Elanna take off in a shuttle to meet the disabled ship. When they beam on board, all is quiet. Dejaren stalks them for a few moments while they try to establish what is wrong with the ship. When he comes face-to-face with the away team, he is nervous, suspicious and distraught. Dejaren introduces himself as an "isomorph". He says that his crew suddenly died of a virus and he doesn't know what to do next. B'Elanna gets to work trying to stabilize his matrix so he can stay visible.

Meanwhile, back on Voyager, Harry Kim has been assigned to work with Seven of Nine. She correctly notes that he seems "apprehensive" at the prospect. Despite his wariness of her frightening Borg behavior, he seems to be developing a bit of a crush on her, and he finds working closely with her unsettling. They manage to get their work done, but they are interrupted when Seven cuts her hand on a piece of equipment. Tom Paris, who has recently been recruited as the Doctor's new assistant, mends the cut in sickbay. He notices that Harry is growing fond of her, and advises him to keep his distance.

B'Elanna has some trouble with Dejaren, who is emotionally labile and unpredictable. One minute he giggles at her need to sustain herself by consuming food ("you nibble like a fish!"), and the next he unleashes an angry tirade about the disgust he feels toward "organics". B'Elanna excuses herself and catches up with the Doctor, insisting that they leave the ship and the disturbing hologram behind. The Doctor brushes her off, suggesting that she be more patient with Dejaren, who is simply lonely and lacking in appropriate communication skills. B'Elanna doesn't buy it, and heads off to locate the hologram's main control center.

As B'Elanna explores other decks of the ship, Dejaren accosts the Doctor and pours out his feelings. He has felt like a slave to the organics, who are weak and unsanitary and require ridiculous amounts of maintenance and hygiene just to stay functional. He has grown to hate them and is glad that he has the ship to himself. He begs the Doctor to come with him and teach him how to use the ship and be free of organics forever. The Doctor starts to realize why B'Elanna is uncomfortable around this angst-ridden isomorph.

B'Elanna finds the matrix controls. She also finds the bodies of the crew, who were not killed by a virus. They were violently murdered — by Dejaren himself. Before she can shut down the homicidal hologram, he appears behind her and grabs her. He thrusts his hand into her body and grips her heart.

Back on Voyager, Harry is trying to get closer to Seven. He asks her out to the holodeck. She has textbook knowledge of human behavior and immediately understands that he is attempting to spark romantic interaction between them. Seven, who believes romance is irrelevant, suggests they proceed directly to copulation, and directs him to remove his clothes. Thoroughly unnerved, the embarrassed Harry retreats.

While B'Elanna's Klingon physiological backups are keeping her alive, despite Dejaren having perforated one of the ventricles of her heart, she is still in need of Voyager's sickbay. She and the Doctor try to disable the crazed isomorph. He makes a grab for the Doctor's mobile emitter, but B'Elanna manages to jolt him with a high-voltage cable, which destabilizes his matrix for good. They hurry off the ship. Safely back in Voyager's sickbay, the Doctor patches up B'Elanna.

== Continuity ==
Paris comments to Torres that it was only three days since the latter said "I love you" to the former (in "Day of Honor" two episodes before this one), even though the previous episode "Nemesis" aired in between. The production code for "Nemesis" (stardate 51082.4) was 40840-171, directly after 40840-170 for "The Gift" (stardate 51008). The 40840-172 production code for "Day of Honor" shows that it was supposed to air after "Nemesis" (stardate "unknown"), directly before "Revulsion" which had the production code 40840-173 (stardate 51186.2).

== Cast commentary ==
Actress Jeri Ryan who plays Seven of Nine, said that "Revulsion" was one of her favorite episodes, along with "The Raven", "Hunters", "Prey", and the two-part "The Killing Game".

== Releases ==
This episode was released on VHS, paired "The Raven".

In 2017, the complete Star Trek: Voyager television series was released in a DVD box set with special features.
