= Year of Hell =

- Star Trek: Voyager episodes
- Episode nos.: Season 4 Episodes 8 and 9
- Directed by: Allan Kroeker (part I); Mike Vejar (part II)
- Written by: Brannon Braga; Joe Menosky
- Cinematography by: Douglas Knapp; Marvin V. Rush
- Production codes: 176 and 177
- Original air dates: November 5, 1997; November 12, 1997

Guest appearances
- Kurtwood Smith - Annorax; John Loprieno - Obrist; Rick Fitts - Zahl Ambassador; Deborah Levin - Ens. Lang; Sue Henley - Ens. Brooks; Lise Simms - Annorax's Wife; Peter Slutsker - Krenim Commandant

Episode chronology
← Previous "Scientific Method"	Next → "Random Thoughts"
- Star Trek: Voyager season 4

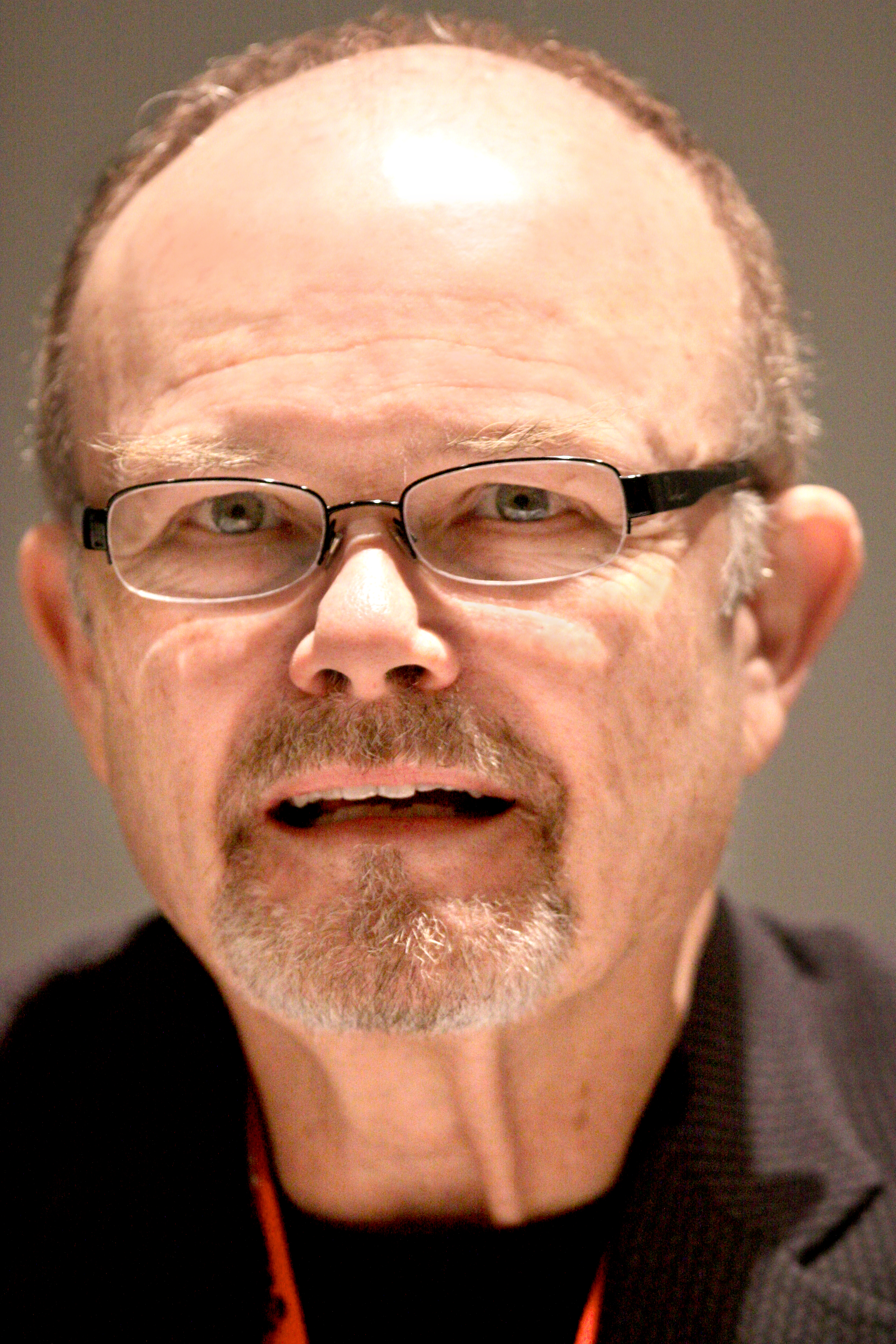
Kurtwood Smith guest stars as the troubled Annorax

"Year of Hell" is a two-part episode from the fourth season of the American science fiction television series Star Trek: Voyager which aired on UPN in November 1997. It aired in two parts, on November 5 and November 12, 1997. Part I was directed by Allan Kroeker and Part II by Mike Vejar; it was written by Brannon Braga and Joe Menosky. This includes a number of guest stars, including Kurtwood Smith.

Set in the 24th century, the series follows the adventures of the Starfleet and Maquis crew of the starship USS Voyager after they were stranded in the Delta Quadrant far from the rest of the Federation. In this episode, Voyager is subjected to several changes in their timeline as an alien ship commander attempts to re-sequence history to his liking.

The events in this episode were foreshadowed in the third season episode "Before and After".

== Plot ==
=== Part I ===
A huge ship appears in the sky above an alien colony and fires an energy beam, transforming the city into mountains and fields. As the wave encompasses the planet, the ship's crew comment on the colony's erasure before targeting the species' homeworld.

On board Voyager, Seven of Nine (Jeri Ryan) and Harry Kim (Garrett Wang) have developed a galactic map which should shave five years from their journey. Seven informs Captain Janeway (Kate Mulgrew) that the area of space they are in belongs to a species that the Borg know as the Zahl. Upon entering this space, a small vessel appears off of Voyager's port bow and begins an unprovoked attack. The ship is a Krenim destroyer, and the captain of the vessel declares that Voyager must leave Krenim space or be destroyed. As the ship's weapons prove useless against Voyager's hull, Janeway ignores the ship and proceeds to negotiate with the Zahl, who disdainfully threaten the weaker Krenim vessel. During their discussion, Tuvok (Tim Russ) observes that a temporal disruption involving the homeworld of the Zahl race has just occurred. As they try to understand what happened, a wave of temporal energy reaches their sector of space.

The wave wipes the Zahl race from existence while making the Krenim vessel bigger and more powerful, and reducing Voyager to a severely damaged state. Now aggressive and more arrogant, the Krenim captain tells Janeway that Voyager must submit to the Krenim Imperium and prepare to be boarded. Janeway takes advantage of Voyager's speed to escape. A scan of the region in the new Astrometrics bay reveals that Krenim warships dominate this region of space and it will be difficult for Voyager to sneak past them.

Voyager begins a running battle with many Krenim ships over a period of two months, suffering heavy damage and casualties. During one attack, Seven of Nine uses an unexploded Krenim chroniton torpedo to devise a method of shielding Voyager against the weapons; however, the weapon partially explodes, blinding and severely burning Tuvok. When utilized, the shielding also affects the temporal waves in the region, attracting the attention of the Krenim "time ship", the large vessel that is causing the disruptions. Krenim scientist Annorax (Kurtwood Smith) built the ship to cause "temporal incursions" to be used to erase species from history to strengthen the Krenim Imperium. However, a prior incursion caused a plague that killed millions of Krenim, including Annorax's wife, and he has been seeking a full restoration of his species for the past 200 years. Annorax decides to destroy Voyager due to the temporal distortions caused by its shields. The crew escape as Voyager is faster, but more damage to the ship ensues. Janeway orders all but the senior staff to abandon ship. She and the senior staff intend to rescue Commander Chakotay (Robert Beltran) and Lt. Paris (Robert Duncan McNeill), who were abducted by the time ship.

=== Part II ===
Captain Janeway makes an alliance with local races to attack the Krenim time ship. The senior staff move to the allied ships while Janeway remains behind on Voyager to pilot the heavily damaged ship herself. With the help of a dissatisfied crew member, Chakotay and Paris take the time ship's temporal core offline, rendering it vulnerable to attack, and beam to the nearest allied ship. Using conventional weaponry, the time ship disables the allied ships. Voyager is crippled when one of the ships collides with her. Theorizing that the original timeline may be restored if the Krenim ship is destroyed by its own weapon, Janeway orders the fleet to drop their temporal shields and rams Voyager into the time ship while it is powering up for another incursion. Voyager is destroyed, while the Krenim time ship's temporal core destabilizes and explodes. This erases the time ship from history, resetting the timeline. As his ship is erased, Annorax witnesses his wife's lock of hair vanish and appears to realize the significance of what is about to happen: reversing all of his changes will bring Annorax's wife back as well, fulfilling his ultimate goal.

In the original timeline, Voyager once again ventures into Krenim space. This time, the captain of the Krenim warship is moderate: he advises Voyager that "this area of space is under dispute" and suggests they avoid it. After giving the command to plot a course around the disputed space, Janeway remarks to Chakotay that she is thinking of replicating a bottle of wine for Voyager’s re-dedication ceremony, saying the vintage is a "good year". Elsewhere, Annorax works diligently in his study. His wife (Lise Simms) enters and asks him to enjoy the day with her. Annorax hesitates for a moment, and then decides he can "make the time" for her. They leave while his work remains on his desk, depicting the calculations for his initial alteration of the timeline.

== Writing ==
During development the writers considered expanding the plot of "Year of Hell" to last for an entire season.

== Reception ==
"Year of Hell" appears at or near the top of multiple lists of best Voyager episodes. Graeme McMillan of Wired said, "this might be the highlight of the entire series, and something that the show should’ve aspired to from that point onwards." In 2012, Den of Geek ranked this the best episode of Star Trek: Voyager, noting an intense encounter between the USS Voyager and the Krenim that involves a drawn out chrono-conflict between the two. In 2011, Tor.com included this as one of six episodes of Star Trek: Voyager that are worth re-watching.

The Krenim time-war spacecraft featured in "Year of Hell" was rated as the 6th best spacecraft of Star Trek by Space.com in 2017. In 2015, Screen Rant rated the Krenim spacecraft as the 4th deadliest spacecraft of the Star Trek science fiction universe.

In 2016, U.K. film magazine Empire ranked this the 25th best episode of all Star Trek television, noting it as "gritty two-part adventure" but lamenting its "reset button" ending.

In 2016, David Brown writing for Radio Times said this has the 36th greatest scene in all Star Trek film and television, Janeway's final scene and spectacular VFX sequence of the Voyager spaceship ramming the Krenim Timeship. They note Janeway's line, "This is one year I’d like to forget" and summarize it as a memorable and high-stakes two parter.

SyFy ranked "Year of Hell" as the sixth best time travel plot in Star Trek, in 2016.

In 2016, The Hollywood Reporter rated "Year of Hell" the 25th best episode of Star Trek overall, but the number one best episode of the Star Trek: Voyager TV series.

In 2016, IGN ranked "Year of Hell" the 16th best episode of all Star Trek series.

In a 2016 article highlighting the best episode from each Star Trek series, Digital Trends declared "Year of Hell" the winner for Star Trek:Voyager.

In 2017, Den of Geek included this episode, along with "Scorpion" (Part II), "One", "Message In A Bottle", "Living Witness", and "Hope And Fear" from Season 4, for their abbreviated viewing guide for Star Trek: Voyager. They also ranked Kurtwood Smith as Annorax as the second best guest star on Star Trek: Voyager.

In 2018, CBR rated the "Year of Hell", as the 13th best multi episode story of Star Trek.

In December 2018, Screen Rant ranked "Year of Hell" as one of the top ten episodes of all Star Trek.

In 2020, SyFy Wire ranked the "Year of Hell" episode pairing the best episode(s) of Star Trek: Voyager. They call it "film level quality", praising everything from the space battles, moral conundrums, and guest star Kurtwood Smith.

In 2020, CNET ranked the Krenim timeship the fifth most powerful spacecraft of the Star Trek universe, for its ability to commit genocide by erasing a species from time.

In 2020, ScreenRant said "Year of Hell, Part I" was the 4th best episode of Star Trek: Voyager, based on an IMDB rating of 8.9 out of 10. They said the sequel, "Year of Hell, Part II" was the 8th best episode of Star Trek: Voyager, based on an IMDB rating of 8.7 out of 10. That same year they rated it the tenth best time travel episode of all Star Trek television.

In 2021, Variety said the "Year of Hell" had the defining moment of the entire Voyager series.

== Releases ==
In 2017, the complete Star Trek: Voyager television series was released in a DVD box set with special features.
