= Scientific method (disambiguation) =

Scientific method refers to the techniques used in scientific inquiry.

Scientific method may also refer to:

- "Scientific Method" (Star Trek: Voyager), an episode of Star Trek: Voyager
- Scientific method (Aristotle)
- Scientific method and religion
