= Perricone (surname) =

Perricone is a surname. Notable people with the surname include:

- Charles R. Perricone (born 1960), American politician
- Michael Perricone, American sound engineer, musician, television writer, and entrepreneur
- Nicholas Perricone (born 1948), American celebrity doctor
