= The Killing Game (Star Trek: Voyager) =

- Star Trek: Voyager episodes
- Episode nos.: Season 4 Episodes 18 & 19
- Directed by: David Livingston (Part I) and Victor Lobl (Part II)
- Written by: Brannon Braga; Joe Menosky
- Production codes: 186 & 187
- Original air date: March 4, 1998

Guest appearances
- Danny Goldring - Alpha Hirogen; J. Paul Boehmer - Nazi Hauptmann; David Keith Anderson - Ens. Ashmore; Mark Deakins - Hirogen SS Officer; Paul S. Eckstein - Young Hirogen; Peter Hendrixson - Klingon Hologram; Mark Metcalf - Hirogen Medic

Episode chronology
← Previous "Retrospect"	Next → "Vis a Vis"
- Star Trek: Voyager season 4

"The Killing Game" is a two-part episode of the science fiction television series Star Trek: Voyager, the 18th and 19th episodes of the fourth season. It is set in the 24th century aboard a starship returning to Earth after having been stranded on the other side of the Galaxy. The episode aired on UPN on March 4, 1998.

This is the third and fourth episodes that continues the Hirogen story arc after the events in "Hunters" and "Prey". The Hirogen have taken over Voyager and conscripted its crew to serve as holodeck prey by controlling their minds using neural interfaces which make them believe they really are their fictional characters. The Hirogen hunt them in holodecks 1 and 2 (as well as adjacent decks the Hirogen have enabled with additional holo-emitters) using different programs.

== Plot ==
=== Part I ===
Voyager has been taken captive by the Hirogen, who repeatedly erase the crew's memories and place them in holodeck programs as prey. Captain Kathryn Janeway, having just been "killed" as a female Klingon warrior, is put into a simulation of Nazi-occupied France in September 1944. The Hirogen take on the roles of Nazi officers patrolling the town of St. Clare, with Voyager's crew as members of the French Resistance.

Janeway is now Katrine, a French restaurateur and leader of the underground plotting against their Nazi occupiers. She works with a bartender (the ship's tactical officer, Tuvok), who is loyal to the resistance movement, and a chanteuse and munitions expert (Seven of Nine). Neelix plays a baker who ferries messages and secret codes to the resistance headquarters; he is eventually wounded and transferred to the Klingon program (that the Hirogen are also running) after his recovery. Chief Engineer B'Elanna is a heavily pregnant French girl named Brigitte whose affair with a Nazi Captain allows her access to enemy areas, specifically the Nazis' radio transmitter.

In Sickbay, the Doctor is furious that he must repeatedly save his crewmates from life-threatening wounds sustained in the simulations; he is also distressed that there has already been one Voyager fatality. Ensign Harry Kim, who is being forced to expand and maintain the holodecks throughout the ship, works covertly with the Doctor to regain control of the ship and its crew from the Hirogen.

The Doctor finds a way to release first Seven and then Janeway from their neural interfaces, and the two plan to break the Hirogen's hold on the rest of the crew. Just then, the Americans storm St. Clare with the help of the French Resistance. Captain Miller (First Officer Chakotay) and Lt. Bobby Davis (helmsman Lt. Tom Paris) arrive to take down the Nazi stronghold in the town, calling in an artillery strike to blow up German headquarters. The explosion overloads the holo-projectors' already strained circuitry and blasts an opening from the holodeck into the rest of the ship. Holograms invade Voyager and the ship's interior becomes a World War II battleground.

=== Part II ===
Janeway fights off holo-soldiers and Hirogen Nazis to plant explosives in Sickbay. When it blows, the neural interfaces release the Voyager crew and they find themselves immersed in a war, or in the case of Neelix and The Doctor, amidst a group of drunken Klingons. Meanwhile, the leader of the Hirogen captures Janeway and she realizes what he is trying to do. His own culture will never survive with their lifestyle of wandering in scattered hunting parties, and if he could establish holo-programs his people could stay together and experience countless hunts of all kinds. Janeway exploits her insight and the two establish a truce.

However, one of the other Hirogen has become too immersed in his role and now believes, according to Nazi ideology, that the Hirogen should exterminate all "lesser" races. He assassinates his leader and orders the mass killing of Voyager's crew. Just in time, Neelix and the Doctor manage to merge the holo-programs, unleashing the murderous Klingons on the Nazis just seconds before they can execute the Voyager crew. Harry overloads the power supply to the holodecks and the program finally ends.

At Janeway's prompting, the Voyager's crew end their conflict with the Hirogen, giving them the ability to create their own holodecks in exchange for them leaving in peace.

== Production ==
Due to Roxann Dawson's real life pregnancy, her holodeck character had a pregnancy storyline; the rest of the season, this pregnancy was covered up, however.

This is one of the few episodes where Jeri Ryan showed off her vocal range - this time as a singer in the bar.

== Cast commentary ==
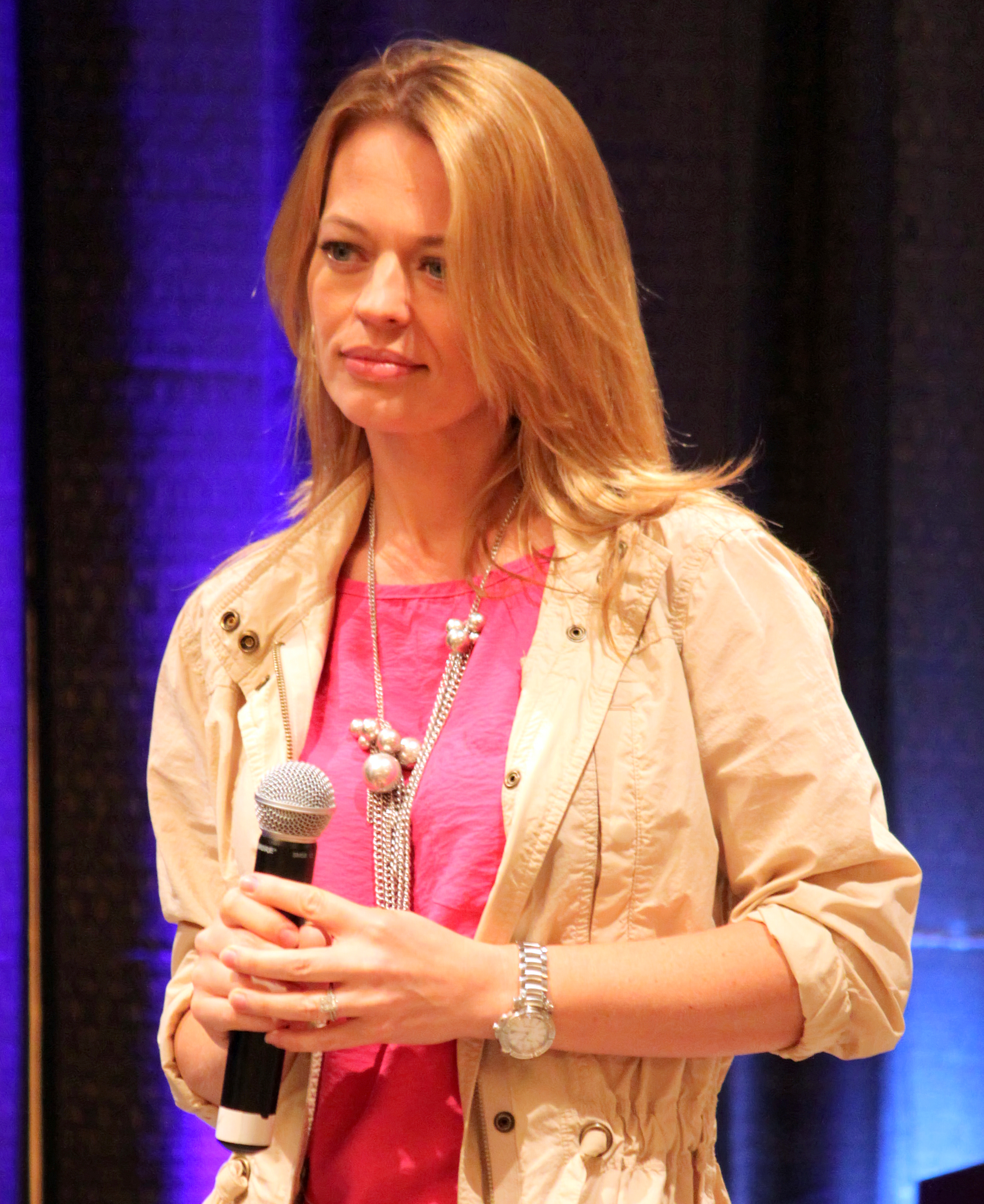
Jeri Ryan, appearing at the Creation Star Trek convention in 2010; she said The Killing Game was one of her favorite episodes of the series

Actress Jeri Ryan, who plays Seven of Nine, said that "The Killing Game" was one of her favorite episodes along with "Revulsion", "The Raven", "Prey", and "Hunters".

== Reception ==
Io9 placed "The Killing Game" as the 91st best in their list of the top 100 Star Trek episodes of all series to-date, out of over 700 episodes. CBR ranked this the 16th best holodeck-themed episode of all Star Trek franchise episodes up to that time.

Den of Geek listed this as an honorable mention for their ranking of the top ten episodes of Star Trek: Voyager.

== Releases ==
In 2017, the complete Star Trek: Voyager television series was released in a DVD box set with special features.
