= Hunters (Star Trek: Voyager) =

- Star Trek: Voyager episode
- Episode no.: Season 4 Episode 15
- Directed by: David Livingston
- Written by: Jeri Taylor
- Production code: 183
- Original air date: February 11, 1998

Guest appearances
- Tiny Ron - Alpha Hirogen; Roger W. Morrissey - Beta Hirogen

Episode chronology
← Previous "Message in a Bottle"	Next → "Prey"
- Star Trek: Voyager season 4

"Hunters" is the 83rd episode of the science fiction television series Star Trek: Voyager, the 15th episode of the fourth season, and the first episode of the Hirogen story arc. The series is about a spaceship returning to Earth, after being flung to the other side of the Galaxy, and is set in the 24th century of the Star Trek science fiction universe.

While attempting to use an ancient relay network to retrieve messages from home, Voyager and crew must contend with the Hirogen who claim ownership of it.

== Plot ==
Starfleet, having recently learned that Voyager is far away in the Delta Quadrant, begins sending messages to the crew. The data is being forwarded to the ship via powerful Hirogen transmission arrays, which are run on the energy of micro-singularities (miniature black holes). The crew is excited to receive letters from home, but frustrated when the Hirogen demand they stop using the communications array. Captain Janeway defies the Hirogen as many more letters from home are still in its database.

Letters continue to be downloaded, spreading good and bad news alike. Vulcan tactical officer Tuvok learns there is another addition to his family, while Janeway learns her fiancé has married another woman, having given her up as dead for three years. First Officer Chakotay and Chief Engineer Torres learn that a large majority of their Maquis friends have been imprisoned or killed by the Cardassians and their new Dominion allies. Helmsman Tom Paris, facing the possibility of a difficult letter from home, realizes his own problems pale in relation to Torres' news. Many of the "lower decks" crew are shown by name and face as "postmaster" Neelix delivers the letters around the ship, and Ensign Harry Kim spends much of the episode wondering if he will get a letter at all, due to data loss.

Tuvok and Seven of Nine go to the array in an attempt to retrieve more of the data. They succeed in stabilizing the feed, but are captured by the Hirogen in the process. The Hirogen are established as a vicious race of hunters, addressing their captives as prey and describing the torture to follow while dissecting them into trophies.

The Voyager crew rescue Seven and Tuvok by exposing a singularity shielded within the array and using it as a tactical advantage. But the ship's link to home is destroyed in the process.

Harry finally gets his letter, but Paris's is lost. The episode closes reflecting on the challenges to come with regard to their newfound enemies.

== Production notes ==
This episode began a four-episode arc of the Voyager crew dealing with the Hirogen. While this episode and "Prey" were "stand-alone" episodes in their own right, when included with the two-part episode "The Killing Game," the Star Trek franchise ventured into a story-arc genre that was also seen in Star Trek: Deep Space Nine, and Star Trek: Enterprise. The "arc" was interrupted between "Prey" and "The Killing Game" by the episode "Retrospect." The death of the Maquis and B'Elanna Torres' reaction to her Maquis comrades is developed even further during season 5 episode "Extreme Risk."

== Cast commentary ==
Actress Jeri Ryan, who plays Seven of Nine, said that "Hunters" was one of her favorite episodes along with "Revulsion", "The Raven", "Prey", and the two-part "The Killing Game".

== Releases ==
In 2017, the complete Star Trek: Voyager television series was released in a DVD box set with special features.
