= The Raven (Star Trek: Voyager) =

- Star Trek: Voyager episode
- Episode no.: Season 4 Episode 6
- Directed by: LeVar Burton
- Story by: Bryan Fuller; Harry 'Doc' Kloor
- Teleplay by: Bryan Fuller
- Production code: 174
- Original air date: October 8, 1997

Guest appearances
- Richard J. Zobel Jr. as Gauman; Mickey Cottrell as Dumah; David Anthony Marshall as Magnus Hansen; Nikki Tyler as Erin Hansen; Erica Lynne Bryan as Annika Hansen

Episode chronology
← Previous "Revulsion"	Next → "Scientific Method"
- Star Trek: Voyager season 4

"The Raven" is the 74th episode of Star Trek: Voyager, the sixth episode of the fourth season. The episode was directed by LeVar Burton, and was broadcast on UPN on October 8, 1997.

Set in the 24th century, the series follows the adventures of the crew of the starship Voyager, stranded on the opposite side of the galaxy from Earth and facing a decades-long journey home; at the end of the third season, the Voyager crew comes into conflict with the Borg, an alien force that captures members of other species and "assimilates" them into their cybernetic hive mind. This episode focuses on the fourth season's new character Seven of Nine, a former Borg drone freed from the collective by the crew of Voyager, and introduces her backstory as a human girl named Annika Hansen; a young Annika is played in flashbacks by Erica Bryan.

== Plot ==
Seven of Nine, having recently been liberated from the Borg collective, is starting the process of learning to be a human again. She begins having hallucinations involving the Borg and a large black bird. The Doctor diagnoses her with post-traumatic stress disorder. He decides to help her move forward by starting her on a diet of real food; now that she has been relieved of her Borg implants she'll need to take in nutrients. Neelix, the ship's chef, prepares a first meal for her to start on, and coaches her on the basics of chewing and swallowing. Suddenly she is struck by another vision, and a Borg implant grows from her skin. She jumps up and threatens to assimilate Neelix.

Captain Janeway is in the middle of negotiating passage through space governed by the B'omar. Her duty is made harder when Seven steals a shuttle and leaves Voyager, trespassing into B'omar space. Crew members Tuvok and Tom Paris covertly cross B'omar security lines in a shuttle to try to retrieve Seven. Tuvok transports to her shuttle, but Seven is able to subdue him. She explains that she is following a Borg homing beacon to a nearby moon, although Tuvok tells her there are no Borg ships anywhere in the vicinity.

Onboard Voyager, Janeway is trying to figure out what caused Seven to leave. Reading Seven's logs, she finds a reference to her hallucinations of a raven. She orders Voyager to scan for any Federation ship other than their shuttles and to set course for B'omar space.

On the moon's surface Seven and Tuvok find no Borg, only the wreckage of an old Federation ship. It shows signs of Borg invasion and partial assimilation. Seven feels that the ship is familiar to her: This is her parents' ship, the Raven. She and her parents were assimilated by the Borg on this very spot. The B'omar attack, but Seven and Tuvok are able to escape the Raven and are beamed back to Voyager, which flees B'omar space.

Later, Janeway mentions the existence of records on Seven's parents, and Seven decides that one day she will read them.

== Cast commentary ==
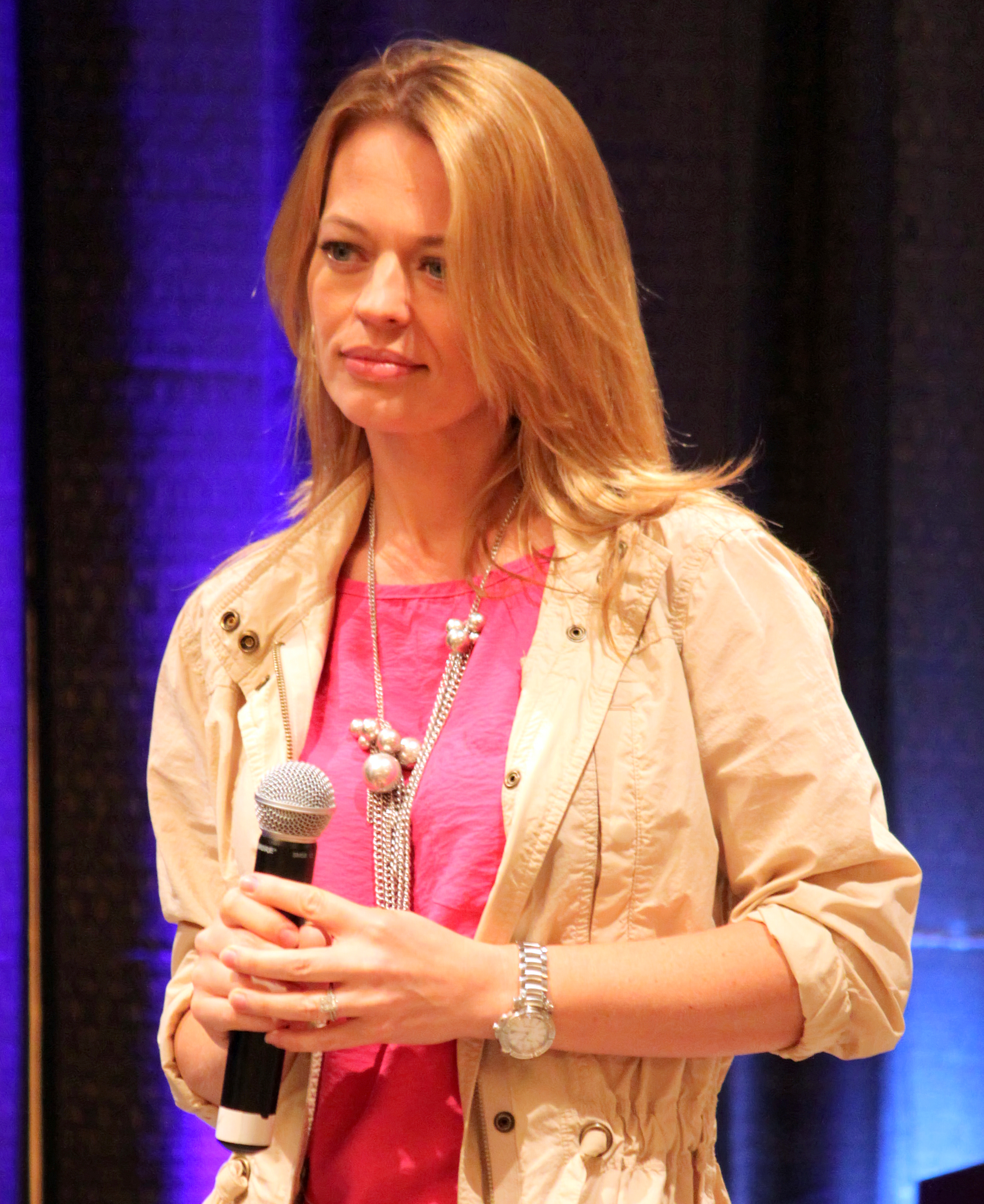
Jeri Ryan, appearing at the Creation Star Trek convention in 2010; she said "The Raven" was one of her favorite episodes of the series

Actress Jeri Ryan, who plays Seven of Nine, said that "The Raven" was one of her favorite episodes along with "Revulsion", "Hunters", "Prey", and the two-part "The Killing Game".

== Reception ==
Ian Grey at RogertEbert.com noted this episode in 2013 in their feature on Star Trek: Voyager, commenting that "The Raven" offered a "metaphor-rich engagement with childhood violence and memory." They point out Seven of Nine's story as an example of child abuse survival, which they suggest can be an "inspiration" to audiences that had childhood trauma.

In 2014, io9 rated "The Raven" as the 75th best episode of Star Trek, and stated it was one of the best episodes about the character Seven of Nine recovering from her Borg assimilation. The fictional Raven spacecraft in the episode is a Federation vessel of the 2350s in the Star Trek franchise, and its design has been made in miniature model.

In 2016, SyFy Wire ranked this the 11th best episode of the 22 episodes Bryan Fuller wrote for Star Trek, remarking "This examination of Seven's origins and her trauma is a little slow, but what it lacks in pacing it more than sufficiently makes up for in character building" with great performances from the cast, especially Ryan.

In 2020, Bustle recommended "The Raven" as one of seven episodes to watch as background for Star Trek: Picard. They said this was a good background for the character Seven of Nine, who was captured by the Borg aliens; the episode shows some of her family life before assimilation aboard the spaceship Raven.

In 2020, Gizmodo listed this episode as one of the "must watch" episodes from season four of the show.

In 2022, SyFy Wire included "The Raven" as one of the 12 (Note: The SyFy Wire article treats the two-part / two-season episodes of "Scorpion" as one episode, doing the same for the similarly structured "Unimatrix Zero", when counting the number of episodes included in its list of 12.) "essential" Seven of Nine episodes in the franchise.

== Releases ==
This episode was released on VHS, paired with "Revulsion".

In 2017, the complete Star Trek: Voyager television series was released in a DVD box set with special features.
