= Unforgettable (Star Trek: Voyager) =

- Star Trek: Voyager episode
- Episode no.: Season 4 Episode 22
- Directed by: Andrew J. Robinson
- Written by: Greg Elliot; Michael Perricone
- Production code: 190
- Original air date: April 22, 1998

Guest appearances
- Virginia Madsen - Kellin; Michael Canavan - Curneth

Episode chronology
| ← Previous "The Omega Directive" | Next → "Living Witness" |
- Star Trek: Voyager season 4

"Unforgettable" is the 90th episode of the science fiction television series Star Trek: Voyager, the 22nd episode of the fourth season. It was directed by Star Trek: Deep Space Nine recurring guest actor Andrew J. Robinson who portrayed the Cardassian character Elim Garak.

The episode was broadcast on the United Paramount Network (UPN) on April 22, 1998. The USS Voyager is visited by a mysterious alien woman, Kellin (played by guest star Virginia Madsen).

The episode depicts a Bussard ramjet, a real-world proposed technology designed to scoop up fuel for a spacecraft's engines. In this episode the engine is said to take in deuterium.

== Plot ==
An alien woman named Kellin (Virginia Madsen) requests asylum aboard the Federation starship Voyager. When she comes aboard, The Doctor attempts to scan her but his tricorder does not retain any data about her. She is from a race called the Ramura, whose biochemistry is such that neither minds nor technology can retain memories of them for more than a few hours. She claims that she came aboard Voyager a month ago to track down a Ramuran fugitive, and that during that time she and Voyager's First Officer, Chakotay, fell in love. The crew looks into it and evidence seems to support her claim that she was on Voyager. Chakotay does not remember her, but as they work together he understands that he could have developed feelings for her.

Just as Chakotay and Kellin start to pick up where they left off, another member of her race appears and fires a weapon at her. The effect of the weapon is to disintegrate her memories of her experiences aboard Voyager. This time, Chakotay is the one trying to convince her that they fell in love, but she is unresponsive and wants to return home. Kellin and the other Ramuran eventually depart Voyager, telling Chakotay that it would be better if he just forgot about her. Chakotay wants to remember everything about this experience, and as they have loaded a virus into the computer which will erase all record of their encounter with Voyager, he records events with an old-fashioned pen and paper.

== Production ==
"Unforgettable" was directed by Andrew Robinson, who played Garak on Star Trek: Deep Space Nine.
