= The Omega Directive =

- Star Trek: Voyager episode
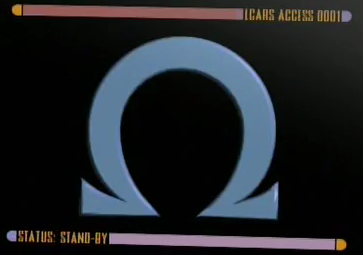
- The Omega Directive screen that appeared at all stations when the phenomenon was detected by Voyager's sensors
- Episode no.: Season 4 Episode 21
- Directed by: Victor Lobl
- Story by: Jimmy Diggs; Steve J. Kay
- Teleplay by: Lisa Klink
- Cinematography by: Marvin V. Rush
- Production code: 189
- Original air date: April 15, 1998

Guest appearances
- Jeff Austin - Allos; Kevin McCorkle - Alien Captain

Episode chronology
← Previous "Vis à Vis"	Next → "Unforgettable"
- Star Trek: Voyager season 4

"The Omega Directive" is the 89th episode of the American science fiction television series Star Trek: Voyager airing on the UPN network. It is the 21st episode of the fourth season.

In this episode, Captain Janeway must undergo a top secret mission to destroy a molecule called an "Omega Particle" that the Federation has deemed too dangerous to be allowed to exist.

== Plot ==
Voyager is suddenly rocked by a distant explosion. Although ship systems appear undamaged, all information and control screens are suddenly locked and display an ominous omega symbol. Captain Janeway arrives on the bridge and instructs the crew not to worry. She orders the ship's computer to override the lockout and transfer all sensor data to her ready room, but leaves without explaining to her bemused crew what happened. After locking herself in her office she asks the computer to brief her on the detection of an object referred to as “Omega.” Janeway also summons Seven of Nine, an ex-Borg member of the crew, to her ready room, as the Borg have their own knowledge of “Omega.”

Because Voyager has been separated from Starfleet, the Omega Team (a specially trained group which would normally be tasked with handling situations involving "Omega") cannot be brought in to deal with the problem. Janeway decides to break the code of silence involving the symbol and share information with her senior officers. She announces that a molecule hazardous to space travel, the Omega Particle, has been detected and she intends to follow the “Omega Directive,” an order that requires Starfleet captains to destroy Omega at all costs. Omega is unstable and the explosion of even one particle can render warp travel impossible forever for a vast surrounding region of space. Since it represents an existential threat to space-faring civilization, the need to destroy it warrants rescindment of the Prime Directive.

Following the explosion’s coordinates, they discover the planet and the alien civilization responsible for creating it. The society is on the brink of economic failure and is making Omega particles to “give their children a chance at a future.” Seven of Nine displays an interest in the scientists' methods, however, hoping to save the Omega particles and harness them because she believes them to be perfection—infinite parts working together as one (like the Borg)—despite ample Starfleet and Borg evidence of their incredible danger: The Borg, referring to the Omega particle as “Particle 010,” are expected to assimilate it at all costs, despite having lost many Borg vessels to Omega particle explosions while trying to harness the power of the substance. Seven notes, furthermore, that the ability to harness Omega would make the Borg a nigh-unstoppable force; this remark only strengthens the urgency and motivates Janeway to wipe out all Omega particles, at any cost, as determined by the Omega Directive.

Eventually, and through a series of issues and difficulties, all the particles are safely gathered together and detonated a safe distance from the alien planet. Just before they are destroyed, they inexplicably stabilize, and Seven is able to view perfection for 3.2 seconds, “an eternity worth.”

== Critical reception ==
Popular Mechanics reacted with derision to the concept of the Omega Particle, listing it as one of "6 Ridiculous Sci-Fi Energy Schemes" and describing it as a "ridiculous" deviation from the general Star Trek value of "mak[ing] its technobabble believable".

DVD Talk said in 2007: "All around this was a great episode".

== Home media ==
It was one of the episodes included in the anthology DVD box set Star Trek Fan Collective - Captain's Log; the set also includes episodes from other series in the franchise including Star Trek, Star Trek: The Next Generation, Star Trek: Deep Space Nine and Enterprise. The set was released on July 24, 2007, in the United States.

In 2017, the episode was included on the complete Star Trek: Voyager series which was released in a DVD box set with special features.
