= Living Witness =

- Star Trek: Voyager episode
- Episode no.: Season 4 Episode 23
- Directed by: Tim Russ
- Story by: Brannon Braga
- Teleplay by: Bryan Fuller; Brannon Braga; Joe Menosky
- Production code: 191
- Original air date: April 29, 1998

Guest appearances
- Henry Woronicz - Quarren; Rod Arrants - Daleth; Craig Richard Nelson - Vaskan Arbiter; Marie Chambers - Kyrian Arbiter; Brian Fitzpatrick - Tedran; Morgan H. Margolis - Vaskan Rioter; Timothy Davis-Reed - Kyrian Spectator; Mary Anne McGarry - Tabris; Steve Silverie - Vaskan Spectator

Episode chronology
| ← Previous "Unforgettable" | Next → "Demon" |
- Star Trek: Voyager season 4

"Living Witness" is the 91st episode of the science fiction television series Star Trek: Voyager, the 23rd episode of the fourth season. This episode takes place in 31st Century, when an AI program called The Doctor (played by Robert Picardo) is re-activated by aliens.

The events from Voyager's time in the Delta Quadrant, in the 2370s, are viewed through the eyes of history as museum spectators observe recreations of the past, nearly 700 years after the initial events. A backup of the Doctor's program is found and reactivated, allowing him to set the record straight. The episode deals with the topic of historical revisionism and is considered by critics as one of Voyager's best episodes.

This episode was directed by Tim Russ, who also plays Tuvok on the series.

== Setting ==
The episode largely takes place inside a museum on a planet in the Delta Quadrant in the 31st Century. The events of 2374, concurrent with the rest of the series, are depicted through holographic recreations created by the museum’s curator and a salvaged copy of Voyager’s holographic doctor. These events are eventually revealed to be themselves a holographic reconstruction by the planet’s historians in the further future.

== Plot ==
The episode opens with a scene on the "warship Voyager", an alternate Voyager with a brutal, sadistic crew. The Vaskan ambassador requests their military aid against their enemies, the Kyrians, but the crew goes above and beyond what is necessary, committing genocide against them with biological weapons and executing the Kyrian revolutionary hero Tedran. The scene is then revealed to be a recreation by a Kyrian museum exhibit, seven hundred years later. In the actual course of events, Captain Janeway had agreed to provide the Vaskans with medical supplies in exchange for dilithium crystals. Tedran and the Kyrians boarded Voyager to stop the deal, which they thought was a military alliance. During their time on the ship, they stole a data module carrying a backup copy of the Doctor.

Quarren (Henry Woronicz), the curator at the museum, has found the Doctor's backup module three weeks prior. He is able to activate it using Voyager's own tools. The Doctor, upon seeing this biased simulation of history, is appalled and offers to show Quarren the correct version of events. Initially, the Doctor's claims that Voyager was unfairly depicted by the Kyrians are ignored, and he is told he could be held accountable for war crimes when he presents his story to the Commission of Arbiters. The Doctor states, however, that a presently non-functional Starfleet medical tricorder would settle the issue of who killed Tedran.

After fending off an angry mob of Vaskans intent on destroying what they now know to be a museum of false history, the Doctor initially wishes to abandon his quest to set the record straight and says that the truth may cause more harm and violence. Quarren objects, saying that the tension between the Kyrian and Vaskan cultures has already reached the breaking point. Quarren stresses that both races on his planet need to hear the truth about the real course of events on Voyager. This persuades the Doctor to continue searching for the tricorder.

The episode ends an indeterminate number of years later, as the museum's new curator explains that the two species finally made peace thanks to the Doctor's efforts, with Quarren living long enough to see peace made. Following the peace, the Doctor served as the surgical chancellor for the Kyrians and Vaskans for many years, but eventually he took a ship and departed for Earth, saying that "he had a longing for home".

== Reception ==
Space.com rated "Living Witness" as the 6th best Star Trek episode overall out of its seven hundred plus episodes. The Hollywood Reporter rated "Living Witness" the 34th best episode of Star Trek overall. Digital Trends gave "Living Witness" an honorable mention in an article highlighting the best episode from each Star Trek series.

TrekNews.net ranked this the second best episode of Star Trek: Voyager. Den of Geek ranked "Living Witness" the second best episode of Star Trek: Voyager, behind "Year of Hell" and noted the "evil Voyager" segment as entertaining. The Hollywood Reporter rated "Living Witness" the 3rd best episode of Star Trek: Voyager. ScreenRant said this was the 7th best episode of Star Trek: Voyager, based on an IMDB rating of 8.8 out of 10. SyFy ranked "Living Witness" as one of the top ten episodes of Star Trek: Voyager. Vulture listed this episode as one of the best of Star Trek: Voyager.

CBR rated "Living Witness" the 6th best 'holodeck' episode of the Star Trek franchise.

As of 2025, "Living Witness" ranks as the 4th most popular user-rated Voyager episode on IMDB with a weighted score of 8.7 out of 10.
