= Day of Honor =

- Star Trek: Voyager episode
- Episode no.: Season 4 Episode 3
- Directed by: Jesús Salvador Treviño
- Written by: Jeri Taylor
- Production code: 172
- Original air date: September 17, 1997

Guest appearances
- Alexander Enberg - Vorik; Alan Altshuld - Lumas; Michael A. Krawic - Rahmin; Kevin P. Stillwell - Moklor

Episode chronology
← Previous "The Gift"	Next → "Nemesis"
- Star Trek: Voyager season 4

"Day of Honor" is the 71st episode of Star Trek: Voyager, the third episode of the fourth season. Roxann Dawson stars as B'Elanna Torres, chief engineer of the Starfleet spaceship USS Voyager. On a spaceship stranded on the other side of the galaxy, trying to make its way back to Earth the crew tries to make sense of their professional and personal lives. The episode aired on UPN on September 17, 1997.

== Plot ==
It is the "Day of Honor," a time each year when Klingons undertake personal reflections on their goals and actions. B'Elanna Torres is not happy — she has to work with Seven of Nine, whom she cannot stand. She has been hostile towards her friend Tom Paris lately, because she is uncomfortable accepting gestures of friendship. Even worse, an accident in Engineering forces her to eject the warp core to save the ship.

B'Elanna and Tom take a shuttle out to recover the core. A ship run by the Caatati, a race of energy-starved aliens, reaches it first. The aliens put a tractor beam on it and prepare to tow it away. B'Elanna warns them not to tractor the core, since doing so is dangerous and could cause the core to explode, killing everyone. The Caatati try to chase them off, firing at their shuttle and causing a hull breach. B'Elanna and Tom have barely enough time to don spacesuits and beam themselves off the shuttle before it explodes. They float alone together in space and watch as the aliens depart.

Voyager receives a distress call from the two lost crew members, who have a limited amount of oxygen in their spacesuits. The ship is held up by the Caatati, who demand supplies in exchange for the warp core. The Borg-hating aliens also demand Seven of Nine. Using her Borg knowledge, Seven manages to satisfy them by building them a thorium generator—a technology that the Caatati had lost after the Borg assimilated much of their culture—that will provide all the energy they need; they are so pleased, they return the warp core and agree to let them keep Seven.

As B'Elanna and Tom float in the vacuum of space, they begin to feel dizzy as their oxygen runs out. When they start to lose consciousness, they say good-bye to each other. B'Elanna insists she cannot die without telling Tom the truth. It takes some effort to admit it, but she tells Tom that she loves him. Moments later, Voyager arrives and beams them aboard.

== Reception ==
"Day of Honor" was rated as the 15th best romantic episode of Star Trek, noting a focus on B'Elanna's love life.

In 2020, Gizmodo listed this episode as one of the "must watch" episodes from season four of the show.

Tor.com rated this 7 out 10, concluding, "A good episode about the struggles of fitting in and figuring out your place in the universe, especially when your universe has been reduced to a single ship zipping its way home."

== Releases ==
In 2017, the complete Star Trek: Voyager television series was released in a DVD box set with special features.

== See also ==
- Author, Author (Star Trek: Voyager)

The "Torres Trilogy":

- Day of Honor (S4E3)
- Extreme Risk (Star Trek: Voyager) (S5E3)
- Barge of the Dead (S6E3)
