= Quantum Quest: A Cassini Space Odyssey =

- Theatrical release poster
- Directed by: Harry Kloor; Daniel St. Pierre
- Written by: Harry Kloor
- Produced by: Harry Kloor; Rayna Napali; Helen Pao-Yun Huang; Ellen Goldsmith-Vein
- Starring: Chris Pine; Amanda Peet; Samuel L. Jackson; Hayden Christensen; James Earl Jones; Sandra Oh; William Shatner; Mark Hamill; Doug Jones; Abigail Breslin; Spencer Breslin; Robert Picardo; Brent Spiner
- Cinematography: Chris Courtois
- Edited by: Dan Gutman
- Music by: Shawn K. Clement
- Production companies: DigiMax Animation; Jupiter 9 Productions
- Distributed by: Jupiter 9 Productions
- Release dates: September 4, 2010 (Dragon*Con); September 17, 2010 (KLIK!); January 23, 2011 (United States)
- Running time: 50 minutes
- Country: United States
- Language: English

Quantum Quest: A Cassini Space Odyssey (originally titled as 2004: A Light Knight's Odyssey) is a 2010 animated educational documentary science fiction adventure film, written by Harry "Doc" Kloor and directed by Kloor and Dan St. Pierre, that takes the viewer on an atomic adventure in space.

The voice cast originally included Christian Slater, John Travolta, Samuel L. Jackson, Sarah Michelle Gellar, Michael York, and James Earl Jones, but the cast changed in 2008, reflecting a new script that detailed a host of new discoveries made by the Cassini–Huygens mission to Saturn. Using a cast of major actors to provide their voices to the characters, the film was initiated by JPL/NASA through a grant from Jet Propulsion Lab via the international Cassini-Huygens mission to Saturn.

== Synopsis ==
The story begins with the Cassini Saturn spacecraft releasing the Huygens Titan probe. The scene is then transposed to Earth, where a 12-year-old girl, Jeana (voiced by Abigail Breslin), places a sun filter over a telescope to view sun spots. She asks her mentor, a Professor (voiced by Neil Armstrong) "Why is the Sun so bright?" This leads the professor to launch into a scientific explanation about fusion. The little girl laughs, having played this trick on her mentor many times, she says "No, I meant bright, bright like happy. In most drawings, the sun has a big smile. Is he good, like the man in the moon." Knowing this means she wants a story, the mentor begins to spin a tale, but as a mentor, this one, while entertaining, is also educational.

As he speaks, we transfer to the Sun, and watching a sunspot spin into view, we dive into and pass through the chromosphere, and head toward the center. The mentor lays down the basis of our story as we travel through the Sun. He explains that the "man in the sun is called the Core (voiced by William Shatner)" and spins a story how he is good and that his children "photons" are sent out to chase away the darkness, and bring life, warmth, and knowledge to Earth. He adds that the only being who does not like the Core is a creature called the "Void" (voiced by Mark Hamill) who is an ancient, malevolent, being who existed before the Big Bang, and who sits at the edge of the Solar System, scheming to stop the Core.

The scene fades through a plasma wall, into "The Hall of Destiny" where we are introduced to the main character in the story – David (voiced by Chris Pine), a young Photon who should have begun his travel to the surface a million years ago. The Core, tries to get him moving on his journey, but David is fearful.

We cut to the Kuiper Belt where a large space battle rages between two fleets – one composed of protons, and the opposing fleet of anti-protons. A character we call "The Ranger (voiced by Amanda Peet), who is a neutrino scout, makes it through the battle lines and heads to the Sun.

Back in the Sun, David is kicking solid light sculptures into a plasma fountain. The Ranger crashes through the wall into David, followed by some imaginary creatures called Gell-Mann ghosts. The Ranger is trying to get to Saturn (other side of the Sun), to deliver a message to the Cassini Space Core Commander. The Gell-Mann ghosts (nasty creatures) surround them. The only way to escape is to give the message scroll to David, and ask him to deliver it while the Ranger holds the ghosts at bay. David sails through the Sun and encounters a "surfer dude" Solar Proton, Jammer (voiced by Hayden Christensen), who surfs the solar winds.

David's journey takes him through the Solar System, to an exploration of the moons of Saturn. Eventually he finds Milton (voiced by Robert Picardo), an older photon character who is mining for free quarks. Milton teaches David introductory material about electrons, protons, quarks, etc. The two evade the evil/comical forces of the Void, until they get captured by the "Dark Side of the Moon".

In the process of escaping viewers learn about the fundamental modes of motion and introduce basic quantum concepts. The message scroll is partially damaged, so David does not know who the space commander is, but he knows that he needs to get to the Cassini spacecraft, because something bad will happen.

He gets inside the Cassini craft and encounters the ship's computer, GAL 2000 (voiced by Sandra Oh), who, in the course of determining the danger, teaches David about spectra, the mission of the spacecraft, different radiation bands used for remote sensing, etc. In the end, they save the antenna of the ship from a beam of anti-matter sent by the Void. They do this with the help of Jammer. David discovers that he is the Space Core Commander (all this time, searching for himself). He leads the transmission back to Earth, and through a system of antennas, is processed, and as Jeana accesses the Web page of JPL, he flies through the screen and enters Jeana's eye.

== Voice cast ==
The film's cast changed in 2008, reflecting a new script and detailing a host of new discoveries.

Original cast, inception through 2007

- John Travolta as Dave
- Sarah Michelle Gellar as Rayna
- Michael York as the Core
- Jim Meskimen as Ignorance
- David Warner as Void
- Samuel L. Jackson as Fear
- Anne Archer as Gal 2000
- Christian Slater as Jammer
- Robert Picardo as Milton
- Tait Ruppert as Moronic
- Lacey Chabert as Jeanna
- James Earl Jones as The Professor
- Casey Kasem as himself

Cast as of 2008

- Chris Pine as Dave
- Amanda Peet as Rayna
- Samuel L. Jackson as Fear
- Hayden Christensen as Jammer
- James Earl Jones as the Admiral
- Sandra Oh as Gal 2000
- William Shatner as the Core
- Robert Picardo as Milton
- Brent Spiner as Coach MacKey
- Mark Hamill as Void
- Jason Alexander as Moronic
- Tom Kenny as Ignorance
- Neil Armstrong as Dr. Jack Morrow
- Abigail Breslin as Jeana
- Doug Jones as Razer / Zero
- Jason Harris as Announcer
- Casey Kasem as himself
- Gary Graham as Green
- Spencer Breslin as Anthony
- Janina Gavankar as Nikki
- Herb Jefferson Jr. as Pilot

Note: This was Casey Kasem’s final film before his death in June 2014.

== Background ==
Though other missions have been seen in film projects, this is the first where NASA initiated the project with an independent filmmaker in order to create an animated fiction film to be based upon on-going missions, science, and discovery. The animated educational film interweaves actual space imagery captured from ongoing NASA missions with an adventure, set in an imaginary universe and intended to create a family-friendly film experience that entertains while educating viewers about the Solar System. The film was tied into 7 on-going space missions and includes footage from the Cassini–Huygens, SOHO, Mars Odyssey, Mars Express, Venus Express, and Mercury MESSENGER space missions. Quantum Quest was released in both IMAX format and regular theaters worldwide. The film integrates pre and post theater educational program for K – 12 students that exceed Federal and State educational guidelines.

Setting yet another precedent, Quantum Quest is the only film featuring Neil Armstrong, the first man to walk on the Moon, who lends his voice to Dr. Jack Morrow, a person who serves as one of four distinguished education ambassadors. Other educational ambassadors are NASA's liaison on the film, Charles Kohlhase, who has led the design of deep-space robotic missions to Mars, Jupiter, Saturn, Uranus, and Neptune and has received NASA's highest award, the Distinguished Service Medal; Anousheh Ansari, the world’s first female private space explorer and serial entrepreneur and co-founder and chairman of Prodea Systems, and Peter Diamandis, Chairman and CEO of the X PRIZE Foundation (which awarded the $10M Ansari X PRIZE), CEO of Zero Gravity Corporation, Chairman & Co-Founder of the Rocket Racing League and co-Founder of the International Space University.

== Development ==
Dr. Kloor started development of the Quantum Quest film project in 1996, a year before the launch of the Cassini–Huygens mission. In 2007, Digimax, Inc., one of Asia’s leading 3D animation studios, committed to financing the film and providing animation. Actual production on the film could not begin until the Cassini-Huygens (at $3.5 billion) reached its target and sent back its discoveries. Final images and radar data, providing a partial radar map, were released by NASA in 2008, enabling the film to proceed. Quantum Quest is a precedent-setting film, combining state-of-the-art CGI with real images and radar data from the ongoing Cassini-Huygen, SOHO, Stereo mission to the Sun, Mars Odyssey, Mars Express, Venus Express, and Mercury MESSENGER space missions, representing billions of dollars of NASA investment.

Working on two continents, Taiwan based Digimax undertook the entire animation pre-production and production task in Taiwan with a team of international artists, while Dr. Kloor and his Jupiter 9 Productions assembled a stellar voice cast, produced all talent recordings and, in concert with the film’s composer Shawn Clement, put together the post sound and music package. The film was distributed and marketed in Asia by Digimax, and by Jupiter 9 Productions in all other territories.

== Music ==
The score to Quantum Quest: A Cassini Space Odyssey was composed by Shawn K. Clement, who recorded his score with an 80-piece ensemble of the Skywalker Symphony Orchestra at the Skywalker Scoring Stage north of San Francisco. Clement integrated sounds and space noise provided by NASA into the music, and served as Post Audio Producer on the film.

== Release ==
Excerpts were shown at the 2008 ComicCon in San Diego which featured voice cameos from actors William Shatner, Chris Pine, Brent Spiner, Doug Jones and Jason Alexander. The film premiered at Dragon*Con on September 4, 2010, and it was screened at the KLIK! Amsterdam Animation Festival on September 17, 2010. It had IMAX screenings at the Kentucky Science Center in Louisville, Kentucky from January 23, 2011, through June 10, 2011. On May 10, 2022, the film was released on several streaming platforms, including Apple TV, Prime Video and Vudu by Giant Pictures.
