= Species 8472 =

Extraterrestrial species from Star Trek

- Star Trek race
- Created by: Brannon Braga; Joe Menosky

In-universe information
- Base of operations: Fluidic space

The Undine, better known by their Borg designation Species 8472, is a fictional extraterrestrial species in the science fiction television series Star Trek: Voyager. They are noted for being a tripedal and telepathic species and for their use of biotechnology. They originated from what is called fluidic space and fought an initially successful war against the Borg. They made peace with the Federation by negotiations with Captain Kathryn Janeway of the Starfleet vessel USS Voyager in the later 24th century.

== Star Trek: Voyager ==
Relevant episodes of Star Trek: Voyager in which Species 8472 appear include: season 3 episode 26 (season finale) "Scorpion: Part 1" and season 4 episode 1 (season premiere) "Scorpion: Part 2", season 4 episode 16 "Prey", and season 5 episode 4 "In the Flesh".

Species 8472 are discovered by the Borg in 2373 when the Borg invade fluidic space ("Scorpion: Part 2") by opening a rift in space using a deflector dish. The Borg discover them in the Delta Quadrant and try to assimilate their biotechnology, which is more advanced than anything the Borg have examined. The Borg quickly realize that Species 8472 is immune to assimilation and that contemporary Borg technology is no match for it. In fact, 8472 is one of the few species so advanced that its ships are able to destroy Borg cubes in seconds. Species 8472 invades the Delta Quadrant in retaliation for Borg aggression and begins a systematic extermination of the Borg as well as innocent species. Over the course of five months, tens of billions of drones are lost, as well as several hundred planets and ships. When the crew of Voyager realizes that it has no choice but to go through Borg space to continue home in any kind of timely manner, Captain Janeway hatches a plan to construct a weapon, based on a treatment that the Doctor had created, to kill Species 8472 and use it as a bargaining chip with the Borg, in exchange for safe passage through Borg space. The Borg reluctantly accept. In conjunction with Janeway, the Borg develop a high-yield warhead armed with modified nanoprobes, developed by the Doctor from the Borg's own technology, that is effective at killing 8472 and forces them to retreat to fluidic space. In return for Janeway's help, the Borg allow Voyager safe passage through their space for the duration of their cooperative efforts. However, upon Species 8472's retreat from normal space, the Borg terminate the alliance in favor of (unsuccessfully) assimilating Voyager.

A member of Species 8472 is left in the Delta Quadrant during the retreat and is relentlessly hunted by a group of Hirogen for several months.

Concerned about the threat posed by humanity, Species 8472 builds 13 "terraspheres" in the Delta Quadrant and recreates Starfleet Academy within, as a staging ground for an intelligence gathering mission on Earth. The plan is uncovered by Voyager, and peace talks commence. Janeway convinces 8472, led by an individual posing as Boothby, that the United Federation of Planets has no quarrel with them – in fact, the Federation is not even aware of the existence of Species 8472, except for the Voyager crew, and the crew is well aware that the Borg themselves started the war between the two species by invading fluidic space to assimilate the superior technology of Species 8472.

== Video games ==
Species 8472 appear as antagonists in the video games Star Trek: Voyager – Elite Force, Star Trek: Armada II, and Star Trek: Alien Domain. They also make an appearance in Star Trek Online, in which they are referred to as the Undine.

== Reception ==
In 2017, Screen Rant ranked the Species 8472 the eleventh most bizarre aliens in Star Trek. Vera Rule writes in The Guardian that their design reminded them "of HR Gigerish bio-nastiness but with Ray Harryhausen animation".
