= Vis à Vis (Star Trek: Voyager) =

- Star Trek: Voyager episode
- Episode no.: Season 4 Episode 20
- Directed by: Jesús Salvador Treviño
- Written by: Robert J. Doherty
- Production code: 188
- Original air date: April 8, 1998

Guest appearances
- Dan Butler - Steth; Mary Elizabeth McGlynn - Daelen

Episode chronology
← Previous "The Killing Game, Part II"	Next → "The Omega Directive"
- Star Trek: Voyager season 4

"Vis à Vis" is the 88th episode of Star Trek: Voyager, the 20th episode of the fourth season. Tom Paris encounters a mysterious alien on a fast ship, but not all is as it seems to be. This is a science fiction television episode set in the 24th century of the Star Trek universe, where the USS Voyager starship, stranded on the other side of the Galaxy is making a long journey back to Earth.

== Plot ==
Tom Paris has grown restless and uninspired by his routine life on Voyager. He spends much time in a holodeck program restoring a 1969 Camaro. He has neglected girlfriend B'Elanna Torres and is skipping shifts in sickbay as the Doctor's assistant.

Tom's interest is sparked when asked to help identify an anomaly, which turns out to be caused by a ship with a working coaxial warp drive, a technology previously thought only hypothetical.

A vessel equipped with such a system could leap great distances almost instantaneously. The ship is malfunctioning and the Voyager crew welcomes its pilot aboard. Tom Paris volunteers to help.

The pilot, Steth (Dan Butler), is an adventurous test pilot, taking new ship designs on their maiden flights. Tom and Steth become fast friends, and Tom requests time off from his boring Sickbay duties to help with Steth's flashy new ship. Steth invites Tom on a road trip, offering him a chance to fly new kinds of vessels and see the sights. After considering his obligations on Voyager, Tom regretfully declines.

After Steth's ship is repaired, Steth grabs Paris and switches bodies with him. Unable to keep his consciousness combined with a host body, Steth periodically must take a new one. Steth remains on Voyager as Tom Paris, and sends his ship, with Tom's mind in his previous body, away at high speed.

Steth assumes Tom's life, but lacks Tom's memories and has a different personality; fitting into the crew proves to be challenging. The new Tom Paris confounds the Doctor, whom he flatters into giving him a vacation, and B'Elanna, whom he charms with affection.

Back on Steth's ship, Tom awakens in a new body. He is almost immediately captured by a woman who has a major grievance with Steth (or the alien who had been posing as Steth). It seems that the real Steth is inside a woman's body, an alien named Daelen, and the real Steth wants his body back.

Meanwhile, the alien posing as Tom on Voyager exhibits odd behavior that confuses the crew. He is cruel to B'Elanna, drinks alcohol on duty, and accesses Captain Janeway's personal log. When Janeway demands an explanation, "Tom" attacks her. Tuvok subdues the fake Tom and Janeway has him confined to sickbay for tests.

The real Tom persuades the real Steth to join forces and find Voyager. They reach Voyager just as the alien flies off with a shuttlecraft, having taken Captain Janeway's body. Tom disables the shuttle and brings the alien back.

Janeway, Tom, and the real Steth are restored to their proper bodies, and the alien – now trapped back in the woman's body – is taken into custody and Steth will track down all of his/her previous victims to be restored to their original bodies.

Grateful to resume his own life, Tom heads off to make up with B'Elanna.

== Releases ==
In 2017, the complete Star Trek: Voyager television series was released in a DVD box set with special features.
