= The Gift (Star Trek: Voyager) =

- Star Trek: Voyager episode
- Episode no.: Season 4 Episode 2
- Directed by: Anson Williams
- Written by: Joe Menosky
- Production code: 170
- Original air date: September 10, 1997

Guest appearance
- Jennifer Lien - Kes

Episode chronology
← Previous "Scorpion, Part II"	Next → "Day of Honor"
- Star Trek: Voyager season 4

"The Gift" is the second episode of the fourth season of the American science fiction television series Star Trek: Voyager, the 70th episode overall. The episode aired on UPN on September 10, 1997. The episode marks the transition of Kes, played by Jennifer Lien, out of the main cast of the series, and integrates her replacement, Seven of Nine, played by Jeri Ryan, into the ensemble.

Set in the 24th century, the series follows the adventures of the crew of the starship Voyager, stranded on the opposite side of the galaxy from Earth and facing a decades-long journey home. In this episode, Voyager has just narrowly escaped being captured by the alien hive mind known as the Borg Collective, and in doing so separated one of their drones from the collective consciousness. Meanwhile, Kes's growing telepathic powers become increasingly dangerous to Voyager, and she chooses to leave the ship to protect it.

The episode marks the last appearance of Kes until a guest appearance in the episode "Fury" in the sixth season.

== Plot ==
After the events of "Scorpion", Voyager still remains without working warp propulsion and is infested with Borg technology. Seven of Nine, the Borg drone saved from the destruction of her cube, has her connection with the Borg collective severed. Her body begins to reject Borg technology. The Doctor must remove the majority of her Borg implants so she can recover. During the operation, she starts to have a seizure, caused by an implant in her brain. Kes uses her increasingly powerful telepathic abilities to disable the implant and stop the seizure.

Seven of Nine is not used to being an individual and repeatedly demands to be returned to the Collective. Captain Janeway refuses and asks her to help with removing the Borg technology in Voyager's systems. Working on repairs, Seven sees a transmitter and tries to send a message to the Borg. Kes, meditating with Tuvok to try to get her telepathic powers under control, senses that something is wrong and uses her abilities to create an electrical surge that disables Seven. Seven is taken to the brig, where she has a long talk with Janeway about her separation from the Collective. Janeway brings Seven of Nine information about her past: before assimilation, she was a human girl named Annika Hansen. The new information enrages her and her wish to return to the Borg remains unchanged.

Meanwhile, Kes and her ex-lover Neelix talk about their past. She demonstrates her new powers; Neelix is hurt as the table they are sitting at starts to change. The ship's structural integrity begins to destabilize, as does Kes's body. The Doctor is unable to explain this reaction; he only knows that her powers must be suppressed or she might die. Kes tells Janeway she has decided to leave Voyager so as not to endanger the ship. She boards a shuttle and puts some distance between herself and Voyager. As her atomic structure destabilizes, she contacts Voyager and tells them she is about to give them a gift. The ship hurtles through space, ending up safely beyond Borg space and ten years closer to home.

The Doctor completes the removal of most of Seven's Borg implants, largely restoring her original human appearance; he also stimulates the re-growth of her hair and fits her with a skintight silver outfit. Seven expresses satisfaction with her new appearance. Janeway tells her she will be allowed to move about the ship once she proves she can be trusted. Before Janeway leaves, Seven tells her that her favorite color was red, answering a question that Janeway asked earlier about when Seven was a little girl.

== Reception ==
In 2017, Netflix announced that "The Gift" was one of six Star Trek: Voyager episodes (Note: Star Trek: Voyager was also represented on the list by "Time and Again", the feature length episodes "Dark Frontier" and "Endgame", and both episodes in the two-part "Scorpion". When compiling its top ten list, Netflix purposely excluded the series premiere and second episode from each of the then-six series in the franchise, in order to "seek data beyond default behavior".) in the top ten most re-watched Star Trek franchise episodes on its streaming service, based on data since the franchise was added to Netflix in 2011.

In 2019, Newsweek recommended this episode as suggested viewing to prepare for the then-upcoming series Star Trek: Picard, in which Seven of Nine also appears, to familiarize viewers with the character's background.

In 2022, SyFy Wire recommend "The Gift" as one of the 12 "essential" Seven of Nine episodes in the franchise – joined by the two immediately preceding episodes, "Scorpion" (counted by them as a single episode), (Note: The SyFy Wire article treats the two-part / two-season episodes of "Scorpion" as one episode, doing the same for the similarly structured "Unimatrix Zero", when counting the number of episodes included in its list of 12.) which introduced her to viewers.

== Releases ==
In 2017, the Star Trek: Voyager television series was released in a DVD box set with special features.
