= Harry Kloor =

American film director

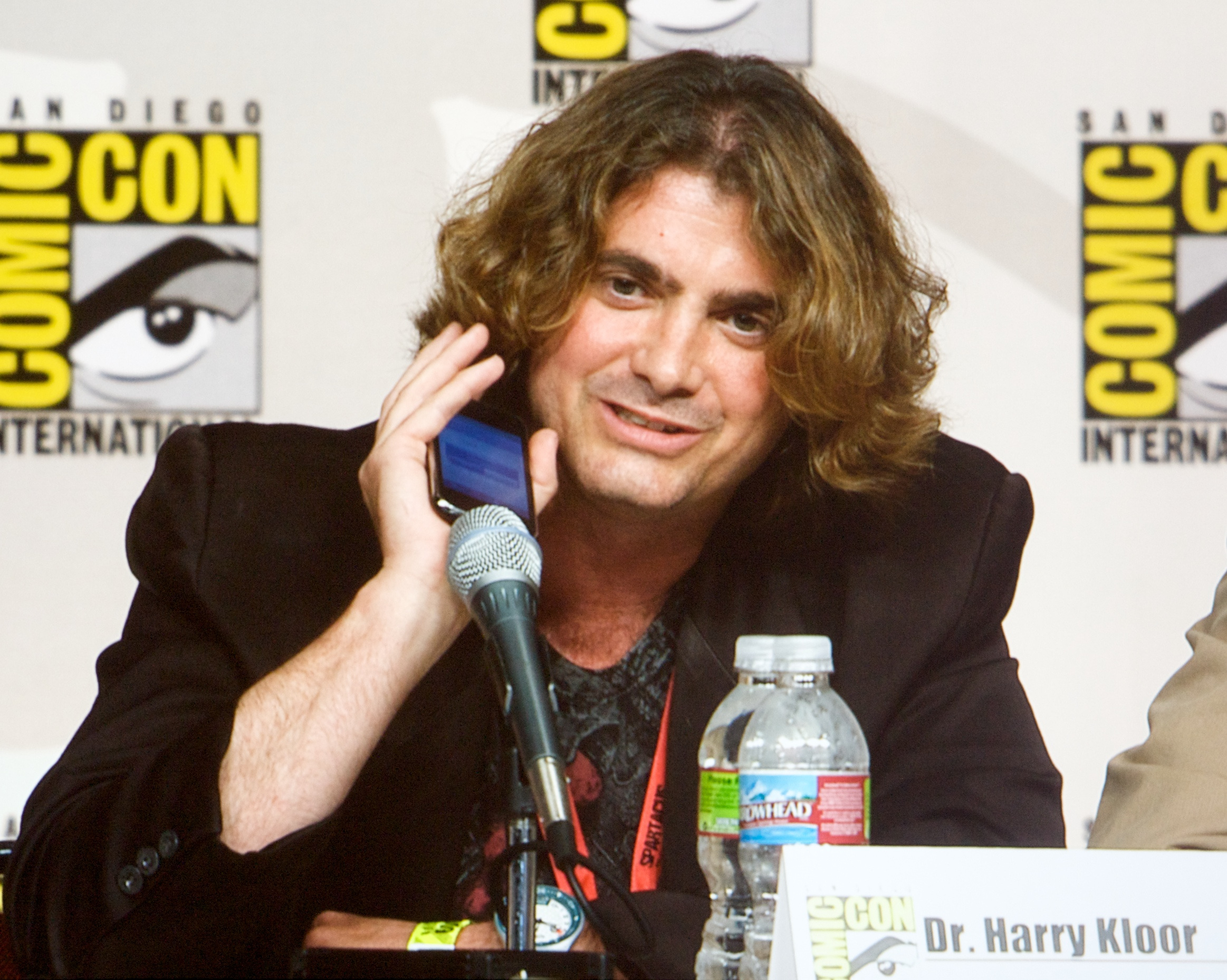
- Harry Kloor at Comic-Con 2009
- Other name: "Doc"
- Education: BA, BA, Southern Oregon State College; M.Ed Southern Oregon University; PhD, PhD Purdue University
- Occupations: Scientist; Educator; Author; Inventor; Screenwriter; Film producer Film director National Technology Policy Advisor; X Prize Chief Technology Officer
- Employer: Co-founder Universal Consultants
- Known for: Simultaneous PhDs in Chemistry and Physics
- Title: Doctor

Harry "Doc" Kloor is an American scientist, film producer, director, writer, and entrepreneur. Kloor was the first to be awarded two PhDs simultaneously in two distinct academic disciplines (i.e. Physics and Chemistry) both earned at Purdue University. In recognition of this achievement, he was named ABC person of the week in August 1994.

== Scientific activities ==
Kloor is the CEO of Beyond Imagination and Jupiter 9 Productions. He was the CSO of StemCC until its successful exit and acquisition by Celularity. He was one of the three co-founders of the Rocket Racing League, was one of the five original founding team members of Ansari XPRIZE, and served on the founding team for Singularity University, where he still serves as a media adviser. Kloor taught at the first summer session of Singularity University in 2009. He was also the chief science adviser for the X Prize Organization, advising X Prize Chairman and CEO Dr. Peter H. Diamandis on science and technology issues. In 2011, Kloor was one of the chairs of the DARPA's 100 Year Starship study.

Kloor also co-founded the company Universal Consultants, where he served as chief science consultant, providing guidance to clients in the development of new technological products, patents, and policy positions. These clients include NASA, the National Security Agency, the American Institute of Chemical Engineers, the US Senate, American Medical Association, and Jet Propulsion Laboratories.

== Film ==
Kloor is a film writer, director, and producer. He has written for Star Trek: Voyager and was the story editor for Gene Roddenberry's Earth: Final Conflict, a series he co-created/developed. Kloor has received Federal grants to develop some of his work with the entertainment industry, creating TV/film projects with NASA and the U.S. Immigration Customs Enforcement Agency. He completed his first feature in 2010, co-directing, producing and writing Quantum Quest: A Cassini Space Odyssey, an animated, action adventure, sci-fi program. In 2014, he co-wrote and produced a film titled ILL WIND, based on Kevin J. Anderson's and Doug Beason's book.

=== Filmography ===
As producer

- Earth: Final Conflict (20 episodes, 1997–1998)
- Quantum Quest: A Cassini Space Odyssey (2010) (and as director and writer)
- ILL WIND (2015–2017) (and as writer)

As writer

- Earth: Final Conflict (1 episode 1997, 15 stories uncredited)
  Episode "Scorpion's Dream" (1997)
- Star Trek: Voyager (6 episodes, 1997–1998)
  "Real Life" (1997)
  "The Raven" (1997)
  "Scientific Method" (1997)
  "Be Afraid of the Dark" (unproduced, 1999)
  "Drone" (1998)
  "False Profits" (1998)
- Godzilla: The Series (1 episode, 1999)
  "Competition" (1999)
- Deadzone: The Series (1 episode, 2004)
  "The Master" (unproduced, 2004)
- Quantum Quest: A Cassini Space Odyssey (2010)
- ILL WIND (2015)
- Carson of Venus (unproduced screenplay based on the 1937 novel by Edgar Rice Burroughs)
