= Message in a Bottle (Star Trek: Voyager) =

- Star Trek: Voyager episode
- Episode no.: Season 4 Episode 14
- Directed by: Nancy Malone
- Story by: Rick Williams
- Teleplay by: Lisa Klink
- Production code: 181
- Original air date: January 21, 1998

Guest appearances
- Andy Dick - EMH Mark II; Judson Scott - Rekar; Valerie Wildman - Nevala; Tiny Ron - Idrin; Tony Sears - Starfleet Officer

Episode chronology
← Previous "Waking Moments"	Next → "Hunters"
- Star Trek: Voyager season 4

"Message in a Bottle" is the 14th episode of the fourth season of the American science fiction television series Star Trek: Voyager, the 82nd episode overall. It aired on January 21, 1998, on the UPN network.

Set in the 24th century, the series follows the adventures of the Starfleet and Maquis crew of the starship USS Voyager after they were stranded in the Delta Quadrant far from the rest of the Federation. Using an ancient alien relay network, the ship's holographic Doctor is transmitted to the Alpha Quadrant to make contact with Starfleet Command.

This episode features a new Federation ship design called the U.S.S. Prometheus, which was designed by Rick Sternbach for the show. This is also the first episode to feature the new uniforms from Star Trek: First Contact in the series, since the Voyager crew had continued to wear the original DS9 uniforms while stuck in the Delta Quadrant.

== Plot ==
Seven of Nine uses the newly extended range of the starship USS Voyager's sensors to locate an unattended network of alien sensor stations. Patching into this, she is able to locate a United Federation of Planets vessel in the Alpha Quadrant. Hoping to contact Starfleet after more than three years in the Delta Quadrant, Voyager's crew attempts to send a message along the relay but it is reflected back after degrading en route. Thinking that a holographic signal would not degrade, they send the Doctor, Voyager's Emergency Medical Hologram (EMH).

The Doctor arrives in the sickbay of the USS Prometheus, a secret experimental Federation warship. He learns from a dying crewman that the Romulans had learned of the prototype and captured it, killing all on board. Being pursued by the USS Bonchune, the Romulans initiate the first test of the new multi-vector assault mode, in which Prometheus splits into three pieces to engage hostile ships.

Seeking assistance, the Doctor activates the Prometheus's EMH (Andy Dick), a Mark II version of the program. The Doctor learns from the other EMH of the Dominion War, which the Federation is fighting in and Romulans have not entered. The second EMH cites protocol for an EMH to deactivate when its vessel is taken over but Voyager's doctor notes that they cannot do so as both ships are at risk.

The Romulans do not view EMHs as threats. Using the pretense of an infection on board, the Doctor goes to the bridge to open the atmospheric filters to flood the ship with anesthetizing gas. The ruse fails but when he is captured and interrogated, the Doctor keeps the Romulans stalled long enough for the EMH Mark II to fool the ship's computer into opening the filters, permitting the distribution of the gas. Just after they take control, Prometheus is intercepted by three Romulan D'deridex-class warbirds.

Unfamiliar with the helm and weapons systems, the two EMH programs fail to fool the Romulans into leaving, before three more Starfleet vessels arrive. In the ensuing battle, all six other vessels target Prometheus. The EMH Mark II stumbles upon the command to put the ship into multi-vector assault mode. Prometheus overpowers and destroys one of the Romulan warbirds; the Romulans retreat and a Starfleet security detail arrives aboard.

On Voyager, the crew has learned that the sensor array was not abandoned but is claimed by the Hirogen, who announce themselves and demand that Voyager disconnect at once. Janeway tries to negotiate but the Hirogen officer is recalcitrant. Seven of Nine buys time to await the Doctor's return by stunning the officer with a feedback loop. The Doctor returns via the array with good news; he has briefed Starfleet Headquarters about Voyager, the first time Starfleet has heard from the vessel since it disappeared three years earlier. Voyager has been removed from Starfleet's list of destroyed ships and a message sent back, "You're no longer alone". Starfleet will attempt to help Voyager and will tell next of kin that the crew is alive.

== Design ==
The original design of the Prometheus was based on a concept drawing submitted by a promotional contest winner hosted by UPN. The exterior of the fictional spacecraft depicted in the episode was created by Rich Sternbach and the special effect sequence was done by Foundation Imaging. The interior sets of the same spacecraft were designed by Richard James. The exterior visual shots by Foundation were done using computer generated imagery.

== Continuity ==
This episode is noted in the story arc of the Star Trek: Voyager show as the first time that Voyager regains contact with the Federation since being stranded on the other side of the galaxy. This provides a backstory for many character developments, such as increased morale and renewed hope of making it back to Earth, and establishing backstory for further contact with Starfleet in later episodes.

== Reception ==
SyFy Wire ranked this episode the third best episode of Star Trek: Voyager, calling it a "fast paced action comedy" and praising Robert Picardo's performance with Andy Dick.

In 2019, Screen Rant ranked "Message in a Bottle" as one of the five best Star Trek: Voyager episodes, (Note: The other four "best" Star Trek: Voyager episodes on Screen Rant's list are "Caretaker", "Meld", "Flashback" and "Timeless".) noting that its "setting is gritty... and the comedy of the dueling Doctors is welcome levity." Screen Rant ranked this episode the 5th best episode of Star Trek: Voyager, based on an IMDb rating of 8.8 out of 10, also noting it has a gritty situation but also comedic elements. The episode was ranked as one of the top 10 episodes of Star Trek: Voyager. Den of Geek also ranked "Message in a Bottle" as one of the top ten episodes of Star Trek: Voyager. Gizmodo listed this episode as one of the "must watch" episodes from season four of the show.

Screen Rant ranked the USS Prometheus as the second fastest Federation Starfleet spacecraft. They note the experimental nature of the vessel in the Star Trek universe, and suggest that it is this advanced design that may have made it possible for the distant USS Voyager to make contact. CBR rated the Prometheus as the third most powerful spacecraft in the Star Trek universe, noting the vehicle for its ability to operate with a very small crew size. The ship was also rated as the 12th best spacecraft of Star Trek by Space.com in 2017.

As of 2025, "Message in a Bottle" ranks as the fifth most popular, user-rated Voyager episode on IMDb with a weighted score of 8.7 out of 10.

== Home video releases ==
In 2017, the complete Star Trek: Voyager television series was released in a DVD box set with special features.

== Expanded Universe ==
A novel published in 2017 features the fictional spacecraft depicted in this episode, Star Trek Prometheus: Fire with Fire by Christian Humberg and Bernd Perplies. The same authors also wrote Star Trek Prometheus : The Root of All Rage published the following year.

== See also ==
- "Eye of the Needle" (Star Trek: Voyager) (S1E7), Voyager's earlier contact with a Romulan ship
- "Pathfinder" (Star Trek: Voyager) (S6E10), one of the next times Voyager and Earth connect
- "Ship in a Bottle" (Star Trek: The Next Generation)
