= Retrospect (Star Trek: Voyager) =

- Star Trek: Voyager episode
- Episode no.: Season 4 Episode 17
- Directed by: Jesús Salvador Treviño
- Story by: Andrew Shepard Price; Mark Gaberman
- Teleplay by: Bryan Fuller; Lisa Klink
- Cinematography by: Marvin V. Rush
- Production code: 185
- Original air date: February 25, 1998

Guest appearances
- Michael Horton - Kovin; Adrian Sparks - Magistrate; Michelle Agnew - Scharn

Episode chronology
← Previous "Prey"	Next → "The Killing Game, part I"
- Star Trek: Voyager season 4

"Retrospect" is the 85th episode of the American science fiction television series Star Trek: Voyager, airing on the UPN network. It is the 17th episode of the fourth season.

In this episode, Voyager's Doctor helps Seven of Nine interpret repressed memories, leading to an accusation of assault against an alien arms dealer.

== Plot ==
Captain Janeway bargains with Kovin, a self-centered Entharan trader, about the purchase of an isokinetic cannon. Kovin agrees to install it, for a gratuity or fee. While Janeway has concerns about his attitude, she agrees to have Seven of Nine work with him on the installation of the device on Voyager. At one point during this work, Kovin pushes Seven out of his way and Seven angrily reacts by striking him.

In a subsequent medical examination conducted by the Doctor, Seven is overcome by distress.

Under hypnosis by the Doctor, Seven recalls a traumatic repressed memory. She now remembers Kovin forcefully removing Borg technology from her body – while on an earlier Voyager mission to the Entharan planet, with Tom Paris, to test some of Kovin's merchandise.

Seven then recounts to the Doctor what she now remembers regarding her violation. Seven went with Kovin to his workshop, to remodulate a new energy assault rifle he is selling. Kovin turned the weapon on her and incapacitated her. Seven then remembers a female lab assistant coming in, being placed on a medical laboratory bed, then the extraction of some of her Borg nanoprobes, which were tested on another person in the lab. Afterwards, she had only recalled Kovin telling her the weapon overloaded and burned her hand — which Seven now believes to be a lie.

The Doctor is strongly sympathetic to Seven's allegations and informs Captain Janeway, who wants first to corroborate the story.

While Paris confirms Seven was alone with Kovin for 2 hours, he observes that Seven seemed completely normal when she returned to him. The Doctor defends Seven's memories as facts as they are very recent, but Tuvok argues that memories are often unreliable, keeping in mind her hallucinations from previous events.

Voyager returns to Enthara, where Kovin denies having assaulted Seven, believing this is either Seven's payback for disagreeing on component procedures or a negotiating tactic. Kovin confirms he and Seven were alone in his lab for 2 hours, but only because Seven demanded 'absolute' perfection from the device. He recounts that the weapon overloaded and slightly burnt Seven's hands, which he treated with a dermal regenerator. When Janeway requests to see the lab for more investigating, Kovin protests, citing the fact that Enthara is totally dependent on trade and will immediately convict any Entharan in order to preserve trade relationships.

An Entharan magistrate accompanies Tuvok and the Doctor enter Kovin's private lab. There are no medical laboratory beds, but when the Doctor finds nanoprobes on tables in Kovin's lab, the magistrate issues a warrant for his arrest. Still proclaiming his innocence, Kovin flees in his ship.

The magistrate boards Voyager, now pursuing Kovin's ship. Tuvok continues his investigation, finding that a sample of Seven's skin, when exposed to compounds commonly found in Kovin's lab, causes nanoprobes to shed onto the equipment.

The Doctor is forced to admit he knows little about Borg-human biology and Seven might have been reliving a memory from her time with the Borg, in which her technology was routinely applied and removed. Hence, the evidence of the nanoprobes in Kovin's laboratory was not enough concrete evidence of Kovin's guilt or innocence to Seven's allegations.

When Voyager catches up with Kovin, telling him that they do not have sufficient evidence to determine his guilt, he believes it is a trap. He panics, fires at Voyager, and causes his ship's weapons to overload, killing himself.

Seven learns a bit more about being human by experiencing human remorse, while the Doctor agonizes over his part in the events. He asks Janeway to delete the algorithms which have been driving him to expand beyond his original programming, such as attempting hypnosis on Seven. Janeway refuses, saying his growth as a result of those strivings have been beneficial to his service to the crew and one cannot simply delete away a mistake. She notes that they all bear responsibility for Kovin's death.

== Reception ==
Fan reactions to "Retrospect" were mixed. Voyager fan voting site Geos ranks it as the fourth worst in Season 4. Many expressed outrage at the analogy to sexual assault, since it implied that false memories are common among rape victims. Jamahl Epsicokhan praised the episode's undertones related to consequences for those accused by victims with false memories.

Staff writer Bryan Fuller commented:

We hear so much about how [false memories] can essentially ruin peoples’ lives, how well-respected and credited doctors have been completely dethroned, how teachers and parents have been humiliated. ... I found myself distanced from [this episode.] I'm always disappointed in a story when it turns out not to have happened, and it's based on some sort of illusion or memory wackiness.

== Releases ==
In 2017, the complete Star Trek: Voyager television series was released in a DVD box set with special features.
