= Scientific Method (Star Trek: Voyager) =

- Star Trek: Voyager episode
- Episode no.: Season 4 Episode 7
- Directed by: David Livingston
- Story by: Sherry Klein; Harry 'Doc' Kloor
- Teleplay by: Lisa Klink
- Production code: 175
- Original air date: October 29, 1997

Guest appearances
- Rosemary Forsyth as Alzen; Annette Helde as Takar

Episode chronology
← Previous "The Raven"	Next → "Year of Hell"
- Star Trek: Voyager season 4

"Scientific Method" is the 75th episode of Star Trek: Voyager, the seventh episode of the fourth season.

The premise of the episode is that of a group of cloaked aliens performing scientific experiments on the Voyager crew, and the effect the experiments have on the various crew members. The episode explores this from a third party perspective, and views the events in a manner similar to the medical experiments humans perform on lab rats or other animals. Meanwhile, Tom and B'Elanna have started a romantic relationship.

The episode was directed by David Livingston, with a teleplay by Lisa Klink from a story by Sherry Klein and Harry Doc Kloor. It aired on UPN on October 29, 1997.

== Plot ==
The crew of Voyager notes that Tom Paris and B'Elanna Torres have become intimately involved, while other crew members report small maladies to the Doctor, such as Captain Janeway, who has been suffering excruciating headaches. The crew initially attributes these problems to effects of pulsars, and they continue on as they appear benign.

Over a matter of hours, Chakotay is aged several decades, losing his hair and going blind. Neelix suffers spots over his body and emits a strange odor. The Doctor and Torres find that both have had their DNA stimulated by an external force, and discover alien writing imprinted on their nucleotides like a barcode. However, before they can run further tests, Torres is overtaken by a seizure and goes into respiratory arrest, and the Doctor's program is shut down.

Seven of Nine receives a coded transmission from the Doctor, and she meets him in a holodeck. The Doctor explains that some entity is tagging the crew's DNA to force these mutations, and that the entity can silence those that come close to the truth. He adjusts Seven's optical scanners to detect outside the normal visual range. Seven starts going about her normal routines and sees several aliens, previously unseen, observing many of the crew which are outfitted with strange devices. Seven tries to alert Janeway without arousing suspicion but two aliens are observing Janeway's response to sleep deprivation using needles stuck in her skull. Seven covertly goes to Engineering to arrange for an energy discharge that the Doctor thinks will disable the DNA imprints. Tuvok detects Seven's tampering and orders her to cease and desist, attracting the attention of nearby alien observers. Left with no choice, Seven uses a phaser to disrupt the nearest alien's cloaking technology, making her visible, and captures her.

Janeway accosts the alien about what they have been doing. The alien callously responds that their experiments are for medical research and could be of benefit to everyone in the galaxy. She even draws parallels to research done by humans on living rodents and primates. In exchange for their 'service', the lead researcher agrees to share whatever data they gather. Taking the Borg's favorite position, however, the researcher arrogantly states that there really isn't anything that the crew can do since the researchers have learned enough about Voyager to thwart any attempts to stop them. Back on the bridge, a helmsman dies as a result of the experiments. Angered and slightly unstable, Janeway takes the helm and sets Voyager on a course between the components of a binary pulsar at full speed. The lead alien fails to regain helm control and threatens to kill the crew. Janeway explains that she's running an experiment of her own to see if Voyager's hull will crack if flown between the two pulsars. She invites the aliens to stay and watch as there is a small chance that they won't all be killed. The aliens choose to leave and beam themselves to two cloaked ships parked on the ship's hull. Both ships detach, but only one survives the gravitational forces. Voyager barely survives its trip between the two stars. The Doctor is restored and he helps to remove the various devices and DNA imprints, returning the affected crew to normal. Paris and Torres consider the possibility that their hormones may have been altered to heighten their mutual attraction, but continue their relationship nonetheless.

== Reception ==
In 2021, SyFy said this episode had an interesting plot, and the scenes with Tom and B'Elanna were "adorable", capitalizing on their new relationship.

In 2020, Tor.com gave this 8 out 10 and was very positive about the performances of the main cast, and felt the episode was "pretty awesome" with a good story and direction.

== Releases ==
In 2017, the complete Star Trek: Voyager television series was released in a DVD box set with special features.
