= Extreme Risk (Star Trek: Voyager) =

- Star Trek: Voyager episode
- Episode no.: Season 5 Episode 3
- Directed by: Cliff Bole
- Written by: Kenneth Biller
- Production code: 197
- Original air date: October 28, 1998

Guest appearances
- Hamilton Camp - Vrelk; Alexander Enberg - Vorik; Daniel Betances - Holographic Pilot

Episode chronology
| ← Previous "Drone" | Next → "In the Flesh" |
- Star Trek: Voyager season 5

"Extreme Risk" is the 97th episode of the science fiction television series Star Trek: Voyager, the third episode of the fifth season. It is set on the starship U.S.S. Voyager traveling back to Earth from the other side of the Galaxy.

In this episode, B'Elanna Torres struggles with bad news, while the senior staff race to build a new, special shuttle, the Delta Flyer, to recover a space probe from a gas giant. The custom-made craft features Borg technology. The construction and testing of the shuttle is a major plot element in this show, and became a recurring element in subsequent episodes. The Delta Flyer was designed by Rich Sternbach, and exterior views were rendered by computer graphics by Foundation Imaging.

The episode originally aired on UPN on October 28, 1998.

== Plot ==
A probe launched by the Federation starship Voyager is spotted by a Malon freighter. To prevent the Malons capturing the probe, Captain Janeway sends the probe into the atmosphere of a gas giant planet; the Malon freighter chases the probe into the giant and is crushed by its atmospheric pressure. Because of the value of the resources it has collected, the Voyager crew attempts to come up with solutions to recover the probe. Lt. Tom Paris presents the designs for a specialized shuttlecraft, the Delta Flyer, that he has been designing over the past few months that would be able to withstand the gas giant's atmosphere. The rest of the crew help to finalize the schematics. Chief Engineer B'Elanna Torres submits designs for the hull and propulsion systems, but seems uninterested in the project, and distant from Paris despite their ongoing romantic relationship. Even talking with Morale Officer Neelix and enjoying her favorite comfort food, banana pancakes, does not cheer her up.

Efforts to build the Delta Flyer are boosted as it now becomes a race to recover the probe: the Malons want the probe as recompense for the loss of their freighter. As it nears completion, a structural flaw is discovered. Torres offers to test it via the holodeck, but purposely turns off the safety controls. The simulation shakes the virtual Delta Flyer and Torres is injured and knocked out from the test. While she is recovering, The Doctor diagnoses Torres with clinical depression. Captain Janeway discovers that Torres has been using the holodeck without safety protocols several times of late, and takes her off duty.

Torres' friend, First Officer Chakotay, attempts to learn more from her, taking her to the holodeck to revisit one of her programs that simulates the deaths of several of their Maquis friends. Torres explains that since she learned (via the recent personal information they got from the Alpha Quadrant) that many of their Maquis allies have been killed by the Cardassians and their new allies, the Dominion, she has been unable to cope with the trauma short of putting herself in near-suicidal danger. Chakotay promises that he and the crew will help her.

The Delta Flyer is finally completed, and Torres volunteers to join its crew, insisting that she be there to monitor the hull stability. The craft, along with the Malon one, race to the probe, but the Delta Flyer arrives first and retrieves the probe. However, on their way out of the atmosphere, the craft develops a hull rupture. Torres is able to create a makeshift force field to contain the rupture long enough for the craft to return safely to Voyager. She is commended for her actions, and celebrates with a plate of banana pancakes, finding herself experiencing positive emotions for the first time in several days.

== Production ==
A costume worn by Roxann Dawson as B'Elanna Torres in this episode was originally designed for William Shatner as Captain James T. Kirk in a cut opening scene from the film Star Trek Generations.

The episode came about after Dawson approached producers and said there was an unexplored dark side to B'Elanna. After the episode aired, Dawson received a good deal of positive fan mail in the way her character dealt with depression and ultimately overcame it.

== Reception ==
In 2020, Gizmodo listed this episode as one of the "must watch" episodes from season five of the show.

== Releases ==
On November 9, 2004, this episode was released as part of the season 5 DVD box set of Star Trek: Voyager. The box set includes 7 DVD optical discs with all the episodes in season 5 with some extra features, and episodes have a Dolby 5.1 Digital Audio track.

On April 25, 2001, this episode was released on LaserDisc in Japan, as part of the half-season collection, 5th Season vol. 1 . This included episodes from "Night" to "Bliss" on seven double sided 12 inch optical discs, with English and Japanese audio tracks for the episodes.
