= Michael Perricone =

Michael Perricone is an American sound engineer, musician, television writer and the founder of Omstream, an online music portal similar to iTunes, but specifically for traditional and world music.

Perricone's writing credits include two episodes of Star Trek: Voyager ("Prime Factors" and "Unforgettable") and two episodes of Charmed ("The Wedding from Hell" and "Feats of Clay"), all written with collaborator Greg Elliot. He and Elliot were also executive story editors on Charmed for a period between 1998 and 1999.
