= Prey (Star Trek: Voyager) =

- Star Trek: Voyager episode
- Episode no.: Season 4 Episode 16
- Directed by: Allan Eastman
- Written by: Brannon Braga
- Production code: 184
- Original air date: February 18, 1998

Guest appearances
- Tony Todd - Alpha Hirogen; Clint Carmichael - Hirogen Hunter

Episode chronology
← Previous "Hunters"	Next → "Retrospect"
- Star Trek: Voyager season 4

"Prey" is the 84th episode of the science fiction television series Star Trek: Voyager, the 16th episode of the fourth season, and the second episode of the Hirogen story arc. The episode centers upon a member of Species 8472, who escapes capture by the Hirogen, and boards Voyager. This results not only in an uneasy alliance between the Voyager crew and the Hirogen hunting the alien, but tension between Janeway and Seven, who harbor different ideas about how to resolve the situation.

== Plot ==
The Federation starship Voyager discovers an injured Hirogen who is in the middle of an intense hunt for what is a formidable and dangerous prey, even by Hirogen standards. He is brought in to Sickbay for treatment, but is eager to get back out and track down his trophy prey. Before he is able to do so, the prey alien invades Voyager - it is a member of Borg-designated Species 8472.

The Hirogen hunter is allowed to hunt for 8472 under Chakotay's supervision. The Hirogen starts attacking an unresponsive 8472 without hesitation. He refuses an order to stand down and battles with his Starfleet escort before being stunned and subdued; he is subsequently confined in sickbay. As the crew later approach the seriously injured 8472, it telepathically communicates with the Vulcan tactical officer Tuvok, pleading to be rescued from the hunter and returned to its home, which is a different dimension known as "fluidic space." Meanwhile, a number of Hirogen vessels surround Voyager threatening to destroy them unless 8472 is beamed over. Nevertheless, Captain Janeway immediately orders Seven of Nine to help the alien return to its home territory, hoping to open the door to peaceful contact with its species. Seven refuses to comply, believing the protection of the hated and feared alien is not worth facing imminent destruction at the hands of the Hirogen. She informs Janeway that the approaching Hirogen ships will destroy Voyager unless 8472 is turned over, and a lesson in compassion will do her no good if she is dead.

As Hirogen ships open fire on Voyager, shield generators are temporarily disabled allowing the Hirogen hunter to escape from Sickbay. The hunter corners 8472 and grapples with it at which time Seven beams both of them to one of the Hirogen ships nearby. By giving 8472 to the Hirogen, Seven has blatantly disobeyed Janeway and assured the creature's death although she tries to justify her actions as being necessary to save the ship. Janeway disciplines her by restricting her access to the ship's primary systems except with Janeway's express permission, confining her duties primarily to the astrometrics lab.

== Reception ==
SyFy recommend "Prey" for their Seven of Nine binge-watching guide.

== Releases ==
In 2017, the complete Star Trek: Voyager television series was released in a DVD box set with special features.
