= Joe Menosky =

Television writer

- Born: United States
- Occupation: Writer

Joe Menosky is a television writer known for his work on the various Star Trek series.

== Career ==
He graduated from Pomona College in 1979, where the number 47 holds special importance (see 47 as an in-joke). Menosky is the writer credited with starting the trend of trying to work the number 47 into many scripts.

Menosky joined the writing staff for Season 4 of Star Trek: The Next Generation, and also wrote for several episodes for Star Trek: Deep Space Nine and Star Trek: Voyager. As a writer on Voyager, he usually co-wrote with Brannon Braga. In June 2016, it was announced that Menosky had joined the writing staff for Star Trek: Discovery.

He later began work as a co-producer on The Orville, and wrote the second-season episode "Sanctuary".

== Writing credits ==
=== Hunter ===
- “The Jade Woman,” Air date: October 17, 1987
- “Hot Prowl,” (Teleplay; Story by Joseph Gunn), Air date: December 8, 1987
- “Allegra,” Air date: December 29, 1987
- “Presumed Guilty,” Air date: November 26, 1988
- “The Pit,” Air date: January 14, 1989
- “City Under Siege, Part 1,” (Teleplay; Story by George Geiger & Tom Chehak), Air date: February 4, 1989
- “Return of White Cloud,” (co-writer with Erin Conroy and Stepfanie Kramer ), Air date: May 21, 1989

=== Star Trek: The Next Generation ===
- "Legacy"
- "First Contact" with Marc Scott Zicree, Dennis Russell Bailey, David Bischoff, Ronald D. Moore and Michael Piller
- "The Nth Degree"
- "In Theory" with Ronald D. Moore
- "Clues" with Bruce D. Arthurs
- "Darmok" with Philip Lazebnik
- "Hero Worship" with Hilary J. Bader
- "Time's Arrow", Parts I and II with Michael Piller
- "The Chase" with Ronald D. Moore
- "Suspicions" with Naren Shankar
- "Masks"
- "Emergence" with Brannon Braga

=== Star Trek: Deep Space Nine ===
- "Dramatis Personae"
- "Rivals" with Jim Trombetta and Michael Piller
- "Distant Voices" with Ira Steven Behr and Robert Hewitt Wolfe

=== Star Trek: Voyager ===
- "Cathexis" with Brannon Braga
- "The Thaw" with Richard Gadas
- "Remember" with Brannon Braga
- "Future's End" Parts 1–2 with Brannon Braga
- "Alter Ego"
- "Distant Origin" with Brannon Braga
- "Scorpion" Parts 1–2 with Brannon Braga
- "The Gift"
- "Year of Hell" Parts 1–2 with Brannon Braga
- "The Killing Game" Parts 1–2 with Brannon Braga
- "Living Witness" with Bryan Fuller & Brannon Braga
- "Hope and Fear" with Rick Berman & Brannon Braga
- "Timeless" with Rick Berman & Brannon Braga
- "Equinox" Parts 1–2 with Rick Berman & Brannon Braga
- "Tinker, Tenor, Doctor, Spy" with Bill Vallely
- "The Voyager Conspiracy"
- "Blink of an Eye" with Michael Taylor
- "Muse"

=== Star Trek: Discovery ===
- "Lethe" with Ted Sullivan

=== For All Mankind ===
- "The Weight"
- "Best-Laid Plans"
- "Happy Valley"
