= Scorpion (Star Trek: Voyager) =

1997 American television program

- Star Trek: Voyager episodes
- Episode nos.: Season 3 and 4 Episodes 26 and 1
- Directed by: David Livingston (part I); Winrich Kolbe (part II)
- Written by: Brannon Braga; Joe Menosky
- Cinematography by: Marvin V. Rush
- Production codes: 168 and 169
- Original air dates: May 21, 1997; September 3, 1997

Guest appearances
- Jennifer Lien (part II) - Kes; John Rhys-Davies – Leonardo da Vinci

Episode chronology
← Previous "Worst Case Scenario"	Next → "The Gift"

"Scorpion" is a two-part episode of the American science fiction television series Star Trek: Voyager that served as the last episode of its third season and the first episode of its fourth season (the 68th and 69th episodes overall). "Scorpion" introduced the Borg drone Seven of Nine and Species 8472 to the series.

Set in the 24th century, the series follows the adventures of the Starfleet and Maquis crew of the starship USS Voyager after they were stranded in the Delta Quadrant far from the rest of the Federation. In these episodes, the Federation starship Voyager makes a "pact with the devil" (i.e. the Borg) in order to combat a new enemy which poses a serious threat to both.

The title is an allusion to the story of the Scorpion and the Frog, which Chakotay tells Janeway (replacing the frog with a fox) as a warning against attempting to cooperate with the Borg.

== Plot ==
=== Part 1 ===
Voyager is approaching Borg territory. The territory covers thousands of star systems and is too big to go around, but they find a narrow path through the sector that the Borg avoid likely due to the numerous gravimetric distortions within it. The senior staff agree that it is better to ride through this path, dubbed the "Northwest Passage", than to face the Borg directly. Captain Janeway orders preparations for a Borg encounter. While helping the Doctor craft antibodies to disable Borg assimilation, Kes has a brief vision of a pile of Borg corpses. She starts to experience several more, all based around the destruction of the Borg and Voyager.

As they near the Northwest Passage, fifteen Borg cubes travel towards them at high speeds, but ignore and pass them. Shortly afterwards, scans indicate that the cubes have been swiftly destroyed. Janeway orders the ship back to investigate. They find a bioship is attached to a portion of a Borg hull. An away team transports over to discover a pile of Borg corpses, just as Kes had seen, and alien roars elsewhere on the ship. As they try to scan for the source, Kes has another vision, this time of Ensign Harry Kim being attacked. Janeway orders an emergency beam-out just as an insect-like creature strikes at Kim. The bioship detaches from the hull and fires at Voyager as they flee the area, the near-miss negatively affecting the ship. Kes reports hearing a voice say, "The weak will perish".

Janeway orders the crew to continue course for the Northwest Passage. Analysis of the Borg's logs shows that the alien species is catalogued as Species 8472 and has defeated the Borg many times before. The Doctor is able to eliminate the alien infection in Kim's body using modified Borg nanoprobes. Eventually Voyager reaches the Northwest Passage, only to find a fleet of bioships waiting, with more emerging from a quantum singularity. After moving to a safe distance, the senior staff discuss their options. Janeway proposes a temporary alliance with the Borg to face a common threat, offering the Doctor's cure for the Species 8472's infection as a bargaining chip. The senior staff are dubious, but agree that it is their only option.

Voyager travels to a nearby Borg-occupied world, and is met by a Borg cube. Janeway announces their intentions, and the Borg beam her to their ship, where she begins negotiations. A fleet of bioships then appears nearby and destroys the Borg planet. The Borg Cube, with Voyager in tow, narrowly escapes its destruction.

=== Part 2 ===
The Borg accept Janeway's offer of the modified nanoprobes in exchange for safe passage through their space, and she and Tuvok begin discussions. However, the Borg find verbal communication to be inefficient and attempt to attach a neural probe to Janeway. Janeway stops them by suggesting they choose a representative Borg for her to speak through, citing that they did this once before when they turned Captain Picard into Locutus. A drone calling herself Seven of Nine emerges as the chosen representative. As they discuss the integration of the nanoprobes into weaponry, a bioship appears and opens fire on the ships, injuring Janeway. The Borg transport Janeway, Tuvok, Seven, and several drones to one of Voyager's cargo bays before ramming the bioship with the cube, destroying both of them. Janeway's injuries are so severe that she needs to be sedated and undergo urgent neurosurgery; before she is, she makes Chakotay promise to maintain the alliance.

Seven learns from the Collective that Species 8472 have killed millions of Borg and several planets in the middle of their territory, and demands Chakotay direct Voyager to help. Chakotay refuses, since this would significantly deviate from their course, and states his intentions to strand the Borg on an M-class planet to be picked up later. Seven is able to access the ship's deflector dish from the cargo bay and uses it to create a subspace rift. Chakotay orders the cargo bay depressurized, jettisoning all the drones into space except Seven who manages to stay. Though the crew regain control of the dish, the rift has grown large enough to draw Voyager into it.

Voyager finds itself in "fluidic space", a liquid-filled place where Species 8472 originate. Seven asserts to Chakotay that since he refused to help, Voyager must face Species 8472 alone, revealing that the Borg started the war when they tried to assimilate them. Their argument is stopped when Janeway announces she has recovered and retakes command of Voyager. She has Chakotay placed in the brig for disobeying orders (but really to appease Seven) and continues work on the weapon, as several bioships are detected heading towards them. The modifications are completed in time, and they are able to destroy the attacking ships.

Seven reverses the process that drew Voyager into fluidic space, but the ship appears in the middle of a bioship fleet. They quickly reapply their modifications to a large-scale weapon that destroys most of the enemy fleet and forces the rest to flee with Species 8472 retreating to their realm en masse, ending the war. Seven then turns on the Voyager crew and tries to assimilate the consoles. The crew have prepared for this — Chakotay uses a neural relay to distract Seven long enough for Torres to electrify the console, knocking Seven out and breaking her connection to the Collective. Voyager resumes its course for the Alpha Quadrant with an unconscious Seven onboard.

== Reception ==
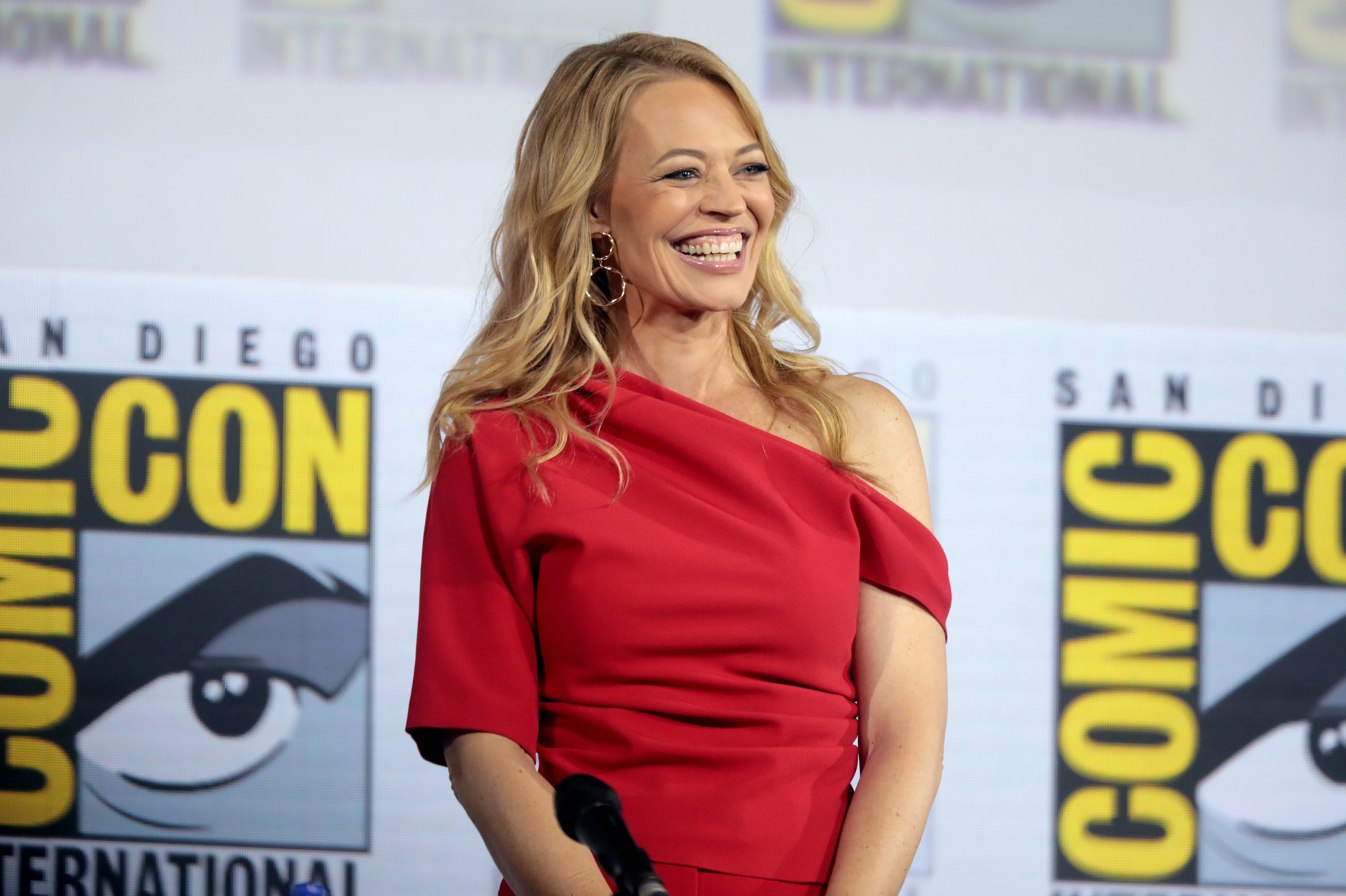
Jeri Ryan was cast as Seven of Nine, joining the show's main cast.

The review in Entertainment Weekly praised Kate Mulgrew's performance in the first part of "Scorpion", saying that the "quietly desperate" character "adds a vitally important emotional core to the ensuing star wars". Furthermore, it added that being a female starship captain added a sense of unique "loneliness" to the character amongst the Star Trek series as the crew was not "male-bonded".

The Hollywood Reporter ranked "Scorpion" the fourth-best episode of all Star Trek:Voyager in 2016. And they ranked it 37th out 100 of the best of all Star Trek television episodes at that time. In 2017, Den of Geek rated the pair of "Scorpion" episodes among the top 50 Star Trek franchise episodes overall. In 2015, SyFy placed it among the top ten episodes of the Star Trek: Voyager series. In 2012, it was placed among the top 5 episodes of the series. In 2017, Netflix announced that "Scorpion" was one of six Star Trek: Voyager episodes (Note: Star Trek: Voyager was also represented on the list by "The Gift", "Time and Again", the feature length episode "Dark Frontier" and the feature length episode "Endgame". When compiling its top ten list, Netflix purposely excluded the series premiere and second episode from each of the then-six series in the franchise, in order to "seek data beyond default behavior".) in the top ten most re-watched Star Trek franchise episodes on its streaming service, based on data since the franchise was added to Netflix in 2011.

Screen Rant rated the Species 8472 bioship the most deadly spacecraft of the Star Trek science fiction universe in 2015, noting its destruction of fifteen Borg Cubes as well as working with other bioships to make a more powerful combined beam capable of destroying an exoplanet. In 2012, Den of Geek listed this as an honorable mention for their ranking of the top ten episodes of Star Trek: Voyager.

In 2016, Empire ranked this the 14th best out of the top 50 episodes of all the 700 plus Star Trek television episodes.

In 2018, Comic Book Resources rated "Scorpion", as the 8th best multi episode story arc of all Star Trek.

In 2019, Nerdist suggested watching this two-part episode as part of an abbreviated watch guide featuring USS Voyager's confrontations with the Borg. IGN recommended "Scorpion, Part II" as an episode to watch before Star Trek: Picard.

In 2020, SyFy Wire ranked the Scorpion episode pair the seventh-best episode(s) of Star Trek: Voyager, they regard it as the action-packed turning point "for the series and franchise" featuring the introduction of Seven of Nine, many Borg cubes, and Species 8472.

In 2020, Space.com and Reactor recommended watching these episodes as background for the newly released premiere season of Star Trek: Picard.

In 2020, The Digital Fix said that "Scorpion" was the best episode in season 3 of the show.

In 2020, Screen Rant said "Scorpion, Part II" was the third best, and "Scorpion, Part I" the second best episodes of Star Trek: Voyager, based on IMDB ratings of 8.9 out of 10, and 9 out of 10, respectively.

In 2022, SyFy Wire included "Scorpion" as one (Note: The SyFy Wire article treats the two-part / two-season episodes of "Scorpion" as one episode, doing the same for the similarly structured "Unimatrix Zero", when counting the number of episodes included in its list of 12.) of the 12 "essential" Seven of Nine episodes in the franchise – joined by the immediately following episode, "The Gift".

== Releases ==
"Scorpion, Part I" was released on DVD on July 6, 2004 as part of Star Trek Voyager: Complete Third Season, with Dolby 5.1 surround audio. The season 3 DVD was released in the UK on September 6, 2004.

In 2017, the complete Star Trek: Voyager television series was released in a DVD box set, which included parts I and II.

"Scorpion" was included as part of the DVD set collection, Star Trek: Fan Collective – Borg released on March 7, 2006.

"Scorpion, Part II" was streamed for free on April 5, 2021 as part of the First Contact Day event on Startrek.com, along with several other episodes and roundtable discussions with Star Trek actors.
