= Star Trek crossovers =

Several characters within the Star Trek franchise, primary and secondary, often made crossover appearances between one series and another. This included appearances of established characters on premiere episodes of new series, a few long-term transfers from one series to another, and even crossovers between Trek films and television. A few crossover appearances, such as that of Spock on The Next Generation and the time-travel of the crew of Deep Space Nine to the era of The Original Series were especially lauded by both fans and critics.

== Appearances in series premieres ==
After The Original Series, at least one character from an earlier series appeared in the premiere episode of each new series. These were the appearances of most of the Original Series main cast in "Beyond the Farthest Star", the first episode of The Animated Series; Leonard McCoy in "Encounter at Farpoint", the first episode of The Next Generation; Captain Jean-Luc Picard and Miles O'Brien in "Emissary", the first episode of Deep Space Nine; Quark and Morn in "Caretaker", the premiere of Voyager; Zefram Cochrane (from the original series episode "Metamorphosis" and the film Star Trek: First Contact) in "Broken Bow", the premiere of Enterprise; Sarek in "The Vulcan Hello", the first episode of Discovery; Sylvia Tilly in "Runaway", the first episode of Short Treks; Jean-Luc Picard and Data in "Remembrance", the first episode of Picard; NOMAD (from the original series episode "The Changeling") in "Second Contact", the premiere of Lower Decks; a training hologram resembling Captain Kathryn Janeway in "Lost and Found, Part 1", the first episode of Prodigy; and Captain Christopher Pike, Spock, Una, Christine Chapel, Nyota Uhura, Joseph M'Benga, Robert April, T'Pring, and George Samuel Kirk in "Strange New Worlds", the premiere of Strange New Worlds.

== Long-term transitions ==
Two long-term transitions were the transfer of Worf and Miles O'Brien from permanent characters on The Next Generation to permanent characters on Deep Space Nine. Worf stayed on The Next Generation until its conclusion, then transferred from the start of season 4 of DS9. Chief O'Brien had appeared in fifty episodes of The Next Generation, but only gained opening credits billing on DS9, in which he appeared in almost every episode of all seven seasons. While not seen as often as Chief O'Brien, his wife Keiko O'Brien also transitioned as a series regular guest star from The Next Generation to Deep Space Nine, bringing their daughter Molly. Miles O'Brien reprised his Next Generation role in that series' finale "All Good Things...".

== Episodes and films focused on crossovers ==
=== Television-to-television crossover ===
An especially significant crossover is Spock's appearance on the two-part Next Generation episode "Unification". Spock meets Data and they exchange opinions on the relative value of logic and emotion, and share mutual impressions of Next Generation's Captain Picard, who for Spock is a model of logical behavior, and for Data is a model of what it means to be human. Critics such as Ina Rae Hark have noted this encounter between two non-human characters in which they summarize their contrasting attitudes to humanity. Data embodies Spock's ideal of pure logic, even as he aspires to become more human.

Scotty appears in TNG Season 6, Episode 4 "Relics".

Recycled footage from the original series episode "The Trouble with Tribbles" is used extensively in Deep Space Nine's time-travel episode "Trials and Tribble-ations". In addition to extensive archival footage of cast from the original series, actor Charlie Brill (portraying Klingon spy Arne Darvin) appears in both new and archival footage. The episode was designed to coincide with the 30th anniversary of the original series. Critic Matthew Kappell notes that the new episode simultaneously "parodies and valorizes" the original series, highlighting the discontinuities between two eras of Trek while trying simultaneously to weave them together.

William Riker and Deanna Troi from The Next Generation appear in a flash-forward to the future in "These Are the Voyages...", the final episode of Enterprise. This episode was widely criticized by both cast members and fans for playing more like a Next Generation episode to the point of being an inappropriate wrap-up for the series.

Strange New Worlds episode "Those Old Scientists" features live-action appearances of Beckett Mariner and Brad Boimler from the animated Lower Decks series.

=== Film-to-television crossover ===
In the Voyager episode "Flashback", events from the film Star Trek VI: The Undiscovered Country (1991) play a pivotal role, and are reenacted with the same actors, thus allowing George Takei to reprise his role as Hikaru Sulu. The episode contains the added revelation that the character of Tuvok was on Sulu's ship Excelsior at the time. Critic Lincoln Geraghty cites this as an example of Star Trek's ongoing propensity for reverential recognition of earlier versions of the series. In a bit of rather glaring discontinuity, the character of Lieutenant Dimitri Valtane is shown to be both alive at the end of the film and dead in the episode. Actor Tim Russ, who portrayed Tuvok, also made an appearance as a bridge officer from the same fictional time period, serving on the Enterprise-B in the feature film Star Trek Generations (1994).

=== Television-to-film crossover ===
The film Star Trek Generations brought Kirk and Picard, Enterprise captains from different centuries, together to defeat a common enemy. It also marked the passing of the film franchise from the original series cast to that of The Next Generation.

== Characters more prominent on subsequent series ==
A few occasional recurring characters introduced in one series continued into other series, sometimes attaining more significant roles in their subsequent Trek series than in the one in which they were first introduced:

- Spock's father Sarek appeared in only one episode of the original series, but became a more developed character in three movies and appeared in the Next Generation episode named after him and the first part of "Unification". Sarek's appearance in the former is described in The Star Trek: The Next Generation Companion as "the first major unifying event tying together the old and new Trek eras since McCoy's cameo" in the original series. Sarek later appeared in Star Trek: Discovery.
- Recurring character Q, originally introduced in the premiere episode of Next Generation, continued to appear in episodes of Deep Space Nine, Voyager, Lower Decks and Picard. Teleplay writer Robert Wolfe found it difficult to incorporate Q into the DS9 universe as the character had been conceived so much as a foil for Captain Picard. He eventually decided to use Q to show personality differences between Picard and Sisko. It was also difficult to decide how to introduce Q into Voyager, as it was necessary to explain why Q did not return the ship to Federation territory.
- Although appearing in only five episodes of The Next Generation and six episodes of Voyager, the character of Reginald Barclay became quite pivotal to the story-arc of the final season of Voyager, significantly contributing to the reestablishment of contact between the ship Voyager and the Federation. Barclay also appears in a cameo role in the eighth movie in the film series, Star Trek: First Contact.
- Three Klingon characters from separate individual episodes of the original series, Kor, Koloth and Kang, all appear in the Deep Space Nine episode "Blood Oath", and Kor further appeared in DS9 episodes "The Sword of Kahless" and "Once More Unto the Breach". Crew members who worked on "Blood Oath" felt that a "special connection" was being made to the original series. Kang made an additional cameo appearance on Voyager, verbally dueling with Captain Sulu in a brief scene of the episode "Flashback".
- The two Ferengi, Arridor and Kol, were minor characters in the TNG episode "The Price" but were the principal antagonists in the Voyager episode "False Profits".
- The Borg race appeared in six of the Star Trek series. Introduced in The Next Generation, they would appear in Deep Space Nine, Voyager, Enterprise, Picard, and Prodigy. Their role in Deep Space Nine was limited to an appearance in the premiere episode to explore Benjamin Sisko's troubled past (his wife having been killed in a major confrontation with the Borg), while their role in the Enterprise episode "Regeneration" served as a 'sequel' to Star Trek: First Contact, as an archaeological expedition discovers the remains of the time-travelling Borg sphere that was destroyed in First Contact and unwittingly reactivate a pair of Borg drones. However, the Borg became a recurring threat on Voyager. One crossover character was the Borg Queen first introduced in the Next Generation feature film Star Trek: First Contact. She would then become a recurring character on Voyager appearing in the two-part episodes "Dark Frontier" and "Unimatrix Zero" and in the series finale "Endgame". These episodes form a narrative thread in which the Borg Queen is battling with Janeway in attempts to re-assimilate Seven of Nine. Only in the final Voyager episode is the Borg Queen played by the same actress who played her in the feature film Star Trek: First Contact, Alice Krige. The magazine Cinefantastique described Krige's appearance as the highlight of this episode. Eventually a new, cloaked form of the Borg Queen appears in Star Trek: Picard, quickly followed by a version more reminiscent of the appearance and personality of the character seen in First Contact and Voyager, in an alternate timeline. Another crossover character is Hugh, a Borg drone who appeared in the TNG episode I, Borg and subsequently in the first season of Picard.

== All crossovers ==
=== Character crossovers ===
The Original Series on The Animated Series

- James T Kirk, Spock, Montgomery Scott, Hikaru Sulu, Nyota Uhura and Christine Chapel all appear as part of the voice cast.
- The robots of Alice and the White Rabbit from Lewis Carroll's 1865 novel Alice's Adventures in Wonderland reappear from the episode "Shore Leave" in the episode "Once Upon a Planet"
- The Guardian of Forever, Sarek, and Amanda Grayson appear the episode "Yesteryear"
- Cyrano Jones, Koloth, and Korax appear in the episode "More Tribbles, More Troubles"
- Kor appears in the episode "The Time Trap"
- Harry Mudd appears in "Mudd's Passion"
- Bob Wesley appears in the episode "One of Our Planets is Missing" after last appearing in "The Ultimate Computer"

The Original Series on The Next Generation

- Leonard McCoy appears in the episode "Encounter at Farpoint "
- Sarek, Spock's father, appears in the episode "Sarek" and again in "Unification I"
- Spock appears in both parts of the episode "Unification"
- Montgomery Scott appears in the episode "Relics"

The Original Series on The Next Generation series of films

- James T. Kirk, Montgomery Scott and Pavel Chekov appear in the film Star Trek Generations
- Zefram Cochrane (originally played by Glenn Corbett) appeared in the film Star Trek: First Contact played by James Cromwell

The Original Series on Deep Space Nine

- Kang, Koloth, and Kor (with their cranial ridges "restored") appear in "Blood Oath". Kor appears subsequently in "The Sword of Kahless" and "Once More Unto The Breach".
- James T. Kirk, Spock, Leonard McCoy, Montgomery Scott, Pavel Chekov, Nyota Uhura, Cyrano Jones, and Korax appear in "Trials and Tribble-ations" (There were clips from the Star Trek: The Original Series episode "The Trouble with Tribbles ", but Benjamin Sisko 's conversation with James T. Kirk was based on footage taken from the episode "Mirror, Mirror").
  - The antagonist Arne Darvin appears through both archival footage, and additional scenes by an older Charlie Brill

The Original Series on Voyager

- Hikaru Sulu, Janice Rand and Kang appear in the episode "Flashback"
- T'Pau (originally played by Celia Lovsky) is played by Betty Matsushita in the episode “Darkling”

The Original Series on Enterprise

- T'Pau (originally played by Celia Lovsky) is played by Kara Zediker and is in a sect that changes the Vulcan government in the episodes "The Forge", "Awakening" and "Kir'Shara"
- Zefram Cochrane (originally played by Glenn Corbett) appeared in the episode "Broken Bow" film played by James Cromwell. This is a role Cromwell reprises from Star Trek: First Contact.
  - Archival footage was later used to depict the mirror universe version of Cochrane in the first part of the episode "In a Mirror, Darkly"
- Archival audio of Captain James T. Kirk's voice from the Star Trek: The Original Series intro is sampled for the end of "These Are the Voyages..."

The Original Series on Star Trek (2009), Star Trek Into Darkness (2013), Star Trek: Beyond (2016)

- Aside from a complete recasting of all the primary roles from the original series, the reboot Star Trek film series also specifically brought back Leonard Nimoy to reprise his role as Spock last seen in Star Trek VI: The Undiscovered Country for the first two films in the reboot series. A recast Sarek, a recasting of Spock's mother Amanda (Winona Ryder), and a recast Captain Pike also appears in Star Trek (2009).
- Pike and Ambassador Spock (Nimoy) reappear in Star Trek Into Darkness (2013) alongside a recast Khan Noonian Singh and Doctor Carol Marcus, characters who were last seen in Star Trek II: The Wrath of Khan.
- Nimoy's Ambassador Spock, and the rest of the original series cast reappear in holographic (Spock) and photographic form in Star Trek: Beyond (2016) and have no speaking roles.

The Original Series on Discovery

- The characters Sarek, Amanda Grayson, Spock, Christopher Pike, Number One and Harry Mudd from The Original Series appear as recurring characters in Discovery, all played by different actors. The Talosians and Vina, from the unaired pilot of the original series "The Cage" and the two-part original series episode "The Menagerie," also appeared in the Discovery episode "If Memory Serves". Archival footage from "The Cage" was also used in "If Memory Serves", with archive footage of Leonard Nimoy as Spock from the episode "Unification II" being used in the Discovery episode "Unification III"
- The Guardian of Forever appears in both parts of the episode "Terra Firma", though it is only revealed to be the Guardian in the second part. The character last appeared in "Yesteryear", an episode of The Animated Series.

The Original Series on Short Treks

- Harry Mudd appears in the episode "The Escape Artist"
- The character of Christopher Pike returns for three Short Treks episodes, "The Trouble with Edward", "Ask Not" and "Q&A", with Spock and Number One appearing in the latter two episodes
- The characters James T. Kirk, Leonard McCoy, Hikaru Sulu, Abraham Lincoln, and Khan Noonien Singh all appear in the episode "Ephraim and Dot", with all apart from Lincoln and McCoy using archival audio from The Original Series.

The Original Series on Lower Decks

- NOMAD (from the original series episode "The Changeling") appears in a storage room in "Second Contact"
- The characters Spock and James T. Kirk are depicted in their Animated Series form for a brief, mute cameo in the first season finale "No Small Parts", with Landru from "Return of the Archons" also making a brief appearance.
- Zefram Cochrane (originally played by Glenn Corbett) appears in the episode "Grounded" voiced by James Cromwell, reprising his role from Star Trek: First Contact and Star Trek: Enterprise
- Hikaru Sulu appears as a hallucination in the episode "Crisis Point 2: Paradoxus."

The Original Series on Prodigy

- Spock, Montgomery Scott and Nyota Uhura all appear as holograms in the episode "Kobayashi" via archival audio.
- Ensign Garrovick, originally portrayed by Stephen Brooks, has an audio cameo in the episode "All the World's a Stage" voiced by Fred Tatasciore.

The Original Series on Strange New Worlds

- The characters Spock, Christopher Pike, Number One, Nyota Uhura, Christine Chapel and Dr. Joseph M'Benga appear as main cast members in Strange New Worlds, all played by different actors than The Original Series with the current actors playing Pike, Number One and Spock previously portraying the roles in Star Trek: Discovery
- T'Pring (originally played by Arlene Martel), James T. Kirk and George Samuel Kirk (both originally played by William Shatner) all appear as recurring characters played by new actors.
- Amanda Grayson, originally portrayed by Jane Wyatt, appears in the episode "Charades," with Mia Kirshner reprising her role from Star Trek: Discovery
- Khan Noonian Singh (originally played by Ricardo Montalban) appears in the episode "Tomorrow and Tomorrow and Tomorrow" played by Desmond Sivan.
- Montgomery Scott (originally played by James Doohan) appears in the episode "Hegemony" played by Martin Quinn. He joined the main cast starting in the third season.
- Roger Korby (first played by Michael Strong) appears the third season, played by Cillian O'Sullivan.
- Trelane (initially played by William Campbell) appears in the episodes "Wedding Bell Blues" and "Like Chronitons Through the Hourglass" played by Rhys Darby, although he's not referred to by name.
- Kor (originally played by John Colicos) appears the fourth season episode "A Case of Chiaroscuro," played by Demore Barnes.
- Lieutenant Rahda (originally portrayed by Naomi Pollack) and Doctor Phil Boyce (originally played by John Hoyt) appear in the episode "Off-Hour" and are now played by Abinaya Sivakumaran and Brian Markinson, respectively.

The Original Series on Khan

- Hikaru Sulu, Khan Noonian Singh, and Marla McGivers all appear, with Naveen Andrews replacing Ricardo Montalban as Khan and Wrenn Schmidt replacing Madlyn Rhue as McGivers.

The Animated Series on Strange New Worlds

- Robert April (originally voiced by James Doohan) appears in a recurring live-action role portrayed by Adrian Holmes.
- M'Ress (originally voiced by Majel Barrett) appears in a non-speaking role by an unknown performer.

The Next Generation on Deep Space Nine

- Captain Jean-Luc Picard appears in the episode "Emissary"
- Miles O'Brien, Keiko O'Brien, Molly O'Brien, and Worf make long term moves to the station, starting with "Emissary", "A Man Alone", and "The Way of the Warrior", respectively.
- Lursa and B'Etor appear in the episode "Past Prologue"
- Vash appears (with Q) in the episode "Q-Less"
- Lwaxana Troi appears in the episodes "The Forsaken", "Fascination" and "The Muse"
- Fleet Admiral Alynna Nechayev appears in the episodes "The Maquis, Part II" and "The Search, Part II"
- Gowron appears on numerous episodes, starting with The House of Quark.
- Thomas Riker appears in the episode "Defiant"
- Toral the illegitimate nephew of Lursa and B'Etor appears on the episode "The Sword of Kahless"
- Kurn brother of Worf appears in the episode "Sons of Mogh"
- Alexander Rozhenko appears in the episodes "Sons and Daughters" and "You Are Cordially Invited"

The Next Generation on Voyager

- Reginald Barclay appears in the episodes "Projections", "Pathfinder", "Life Line", "Inside Man", "Author, Author" and "Endgame"
- William Riker appears in the episode "Death Wish"
- "Q" appears in the episodes "Death Wish", "The Q and the Grey" and "Q2"
- The two Ferengi (Arridor and Kol) testing the wormhole from "The Price" appear in episode "False Profits"
- Facsimiles of Boothby appear in the episodes "In the Flesh" and "The Fight"
- Geordi La Forge from an alternate future appears in the episode "Timeless"
- The Borg Queen from Star Trek: First Contact appears in the episodes "Dark Frontier", "Unimatrix Zero" and "Endgame"
- Deanna Troi appears in the episodes "Pathfinder", "Life Line" and "Inside Man"

The Next Generation on Enterprise

- William Riker, Deanna Troi, and the voice of Data appear in the episode "These Are the Voyages... ", with archival audio of Captain Jean-Luc Picard's voice from the Star Trek: The Next Generation intro being sampled for the end of the episode

The Next Generation on Short Treks

- Jean-Luc Picard appears on a screen in the episode "Children of Mars"

The Next Generation on Picard

- In addition to the shows title character Jean-Luc Picard, Data, William Riker, Deanna Troi, Bruce Maddox (played by a different actor than in the Next Generation episode "The Measure of a Man"), Hugh (from the Next Generation episodes "I, Borg " and "Descent ") and Data's disassembled "brother" B-4 from Star Trek: Nemesis, have all appeared on Picard in its first season.
- Guinan, Q, and Wesley Crusher appear in season 2 of Picard
- Beverly Crusher, Worf, Geordi La Forge, Lore, Ro Laren, and Fleet Admiral Shelby appear in season 3 of Picard, in addition to the return of Jean-Luc Picard, William Riker, Deanna Troi, and Data. The Borg Queen also returns, once again voiced by Alice Krige but physically played by Jane Edwina Seymour.

The Next Generation on Lower Decks

- Q appears in the episode "Veritas"
- William Riker and Deanna Troi appear in the first season finale "No Small Parts," and Riker also appears in the season 2 episodes "Strange Energies" and "Kayshon, His Eyes Open"
- A holographic statue of Miles O'Brien appears in the far future in the episode "Temporal Edict"
- The Borg Queen appears as a hologram in the episode "I, Exctretus"
- Elizabeth Shelby and Thadiun Okona appear in silent cameos in "An Embarrassment of Dooplers".
- Sonya Gomez appears in the episode "First First Contact"
- Morgan Bateson appears in a non-speaking role in the episode "Grounded"
- An illusion of Leah Brahms appears in the episode "Mining the Mind's Mines"
- Nick Lorcano appears in the episode "The Inner Fight" and he also appears with Wesley Crusher and Sito Jaxa in "Old Friends, New Planets."
- An alternate reality version of Data appears in the episode "Fully Dilated."
- Lily Sloane from an alternate universe appears in the episode "Fissure Quest" and has a non-speaking appearance in "The New Next Generation."

The Next Generation on Prodigy

- Thadiun Okona appears in the episodes "Crossroads," Masquerade" and "Cracked Mirror"
- A hologram of Beverly Crusher appears in the episode "Kobayashi" while the real Dr. Crusher appears in the episodes "Last Flight of the Protostar, Part II" and "Ouroboros, Part II"
- Edward Jellico is a recurring character in both season 1 and season 2
- Wesley Crusher joins the main cast starting with the season 2 episode "The Devourer of All Things, Part I". The Traveler also has a vocal cameo this episode.

The Next Generation on Section 31

- Rachel Garrett (originally portrayed by Tricia O'Neil) appears as part of the main cast, played by Kacey Rohl.

Deep Space Nine on The Next Generation

- Julian Bashir appears in the episode "Birthright, Part I," which partially takes place on Deep Space Nine
- Quark has a brief cameo in the episode "Firstborn"

Deep Space Nine on Voyager

- Quark and Morn both appear in "Caretaker".

Deep Space Nine on Lower Decks

- Martok appears as an interactive character in a Ferengi boardgame in the episode "The Least Dangerous Game"
- Quark, Kira Nerys, and Morn appear in "Hear All, Trust Nothing".
- Rom and Leeta appear in "Parth Ferengi's Heart Place".
- Elim Garak and a holographic Julian Bashir from alternate universes appear in the episode "Fissure Quest" and also appear with no dialog in "The New Next Generation." An alternate version of Curzon Dax also appears in "Fissure Quest," voiced by Fred Tatasciore. (The Prime Universe version originally appeared in a non-speaking role played by Frank Owen Smith).

Deep Space Nine on Prodigy

- Odo appears as a hologram in the episode "Kobayashi" via archival audio.

Deep Space Nine on Starfleet Academy

- A holographic Jake Sisko appears in the episode "Series Acclimation Mil"

Voyager on The Next Generation series of films

- The Mark I EMH "Doctor" appeared in the film Star Trek: First Contact. This EMH, while identical in name, appearance and mannerisms, was distinct from the Voyager character due to the nature of the EMH being a holographic computer program.
- Vice Admiral Kathryn Janeway has a brief cameo in the film Star Trek: Nemesis

Voyager on Deep Space Nine

- The mirror-universe version of Tuvok appears in the episode "Through the Looking Glass"
- Dr. Lewis Zimmerman and the Mark I EMH "Doctor" both appear in the episode "Doctor Bashir, I Presume?"

Voyager on Picard

- Seven of Nine has appeared five times in the first season episodes of Star Trek: Picard : "Absolute Candor", "Broken Pieces", "Et in Arcadia Ego: Part I", "Et in Arcadia Ego: Part II" and in "Stardust City Rag" she appears alongside Icheb in a final and brief cameo role. Icheb however is portrayed by different actors than those who had acted in the role on Star Trek: Voyager. Seven would go on to join the main cast for the second and third seasons.
- Tuvok appears in two season 3 episodes: "Dominion", in which he was revealed to be an imposter, and "The Last Generation" which featured the real Tuvok.

Voyager on Lower Decks

- Tuvok appears in a non-speaking role in the episode "Grounded"
- Michael Sullivan, Doctor Chaotica and The Clown (originally portrayed by Fintan McKeown, Martin Rayner and Michael McKean, respectively) all appear in the episode "Twovix," with Chaotica played by James Sie, and Sullivan and The Clown voiced by uncredited actors.
- Multiple versions of Harry Kim from alternate universes appear in the episode "Fissure Quest" and in non-speaking roles in "The New Next Generation."

Voyager on Prodigy

- Kathryn Janeway is part of the main cast, appearing both as "Hologram Janeway" and the real Vice-Admiral Janeway.
- Chakotay appears as a recurring character before joining the main cast in the season 2 episode "Last Flight of the Protostar, Part I"
- The Doctor joins the main cast in season 2

Voyager on Khan

- Tuvok appears as part of the cast.

Voyager on Starfleet Academy

- The Doctor is part of the main cast

Enterprise on Discovery

- Agent Daniels (originally played by Matt Winston) is a recurring character operating under the name Kovich and is portrayed by David Cronenberg.

Enterprise on Lower Decks

- An alternate reality version of T'Pol appears in the episode "Fissure Quest" and also in "The New Next Generation" in a non-speaking role.

Discovery on Short Treks

- The characters of Tilly and Saru appear in the episodes "Runaway" and "The Brightest Star" respectively, with Phillipa Georgiou also appearing briefly in the latter episode
- Younger versions of Michael Burnham and her father Mike Burnham appear in the animated episode "The Girl Who Made The Stars"

Discovery on Section 31

- Emperor Phillipa Georgiou appears in the lead role.

Discovery on Starfleet Academy

- Jett Reno and Charles Vance appear as part of the main cast.
- Syliva Tilly appears in the episode "The Life of the Stars"

Short Treks on Discovery

- Me Hani Ika Hali Ka Po from the Short Treks episode "Runaway" appears in both parts of the Discovery episode "Such Sweet Sorrow"
- Siranna from the Short Treks episode "The Brightest Star" appears in the Discovery episodes "The Sound of Thunder", "Such Sweet Sorrow, Part 2" and through archival footage in "Lights and Shadows"

Picard on Prodigy

- Jack Crusher, originally played by Ed Speleers, has a vocal cameo by Isabel Krebs

Lower Decks on Strange New Worlds

- Brad Boimler and Beckett Mariner appear in both live-action and animation in the episode "Those Old Scientists". D'Vana Tendi, Sam Rutherford and Jack Ransom all appear in their animated forms.

=== Actor crossovers ===
The Original Series on The Next Generation

- Majel Barrett (Christine Chapel) appears as recurring character Lwaxana Troi as well as the voice of the Enterprise computer.
- Diana Muldaur (Dr. Miranda Jones and Ann Mulhall) appears as Dr. Katherine Pulaski

The Original Series on The Next Generation, Deep Space Nine and Voyager:

- Majel Barrett Roddenberry (Christine Chapel and Number One, as well as the Enterprise computer's voice) is the computer voice on the Enterprise-D, Enterprise-E, Voyager, and Defiant.

The Original Series on Deep Space Nine:

- Clint Howard who played Balok on the episode “The Corbomite Maneuver” appeared as the mentally ill Sanctuary resident Grady in DS9's “Past Tense, Part II”

The Original Series on Enterprise:

- Clint Howard who played Balok on the episode “The Corbomite Maneuver” played the Ferengi Muk in Enterprise's first-year episode “Acquisition”

The Original Series on Discovery:

- Clint Howard who played Balok on the episode “The Corbomite Maneuver” played an Orion Drug Dealer in the Star Trek: Discovery season one finale, "Will You Take My Hand?"

The Original Series on Picard:

- Walter Koenig (Pavel Chekov) voices Anton Chekov in the episode "The Last Generation"

The Next Generation on The Original Series

- In Star Trek VI: The Undiscovered Country: Michael Dorn (Worf) appears as Colonel Worf, the grandfather of Lieutenant Worf.

The Next Generation on Deep Space Nine

- Marc Alaimo (Cmdr. Tebok / Gul Macet / Frederick LaRouque) plays a major role as the Cardassian military officer, Gul Dukat.
- James Cromwell (Zefram Cochrane) appears in the episode "Starship Down" as Hanok. He also appears on Star Trek: The Next Generation as Prime Minister Nayrok and Jaglom Shrek.

The Next Generation on Enterprise

- Andreas Katsulas (Commander Tomalak) plays Vissian Captain Drennik in the episode "Cogenitor".
- Brent Spiner (Data) plays Arik Soong in series 4, who is intended to be the great-grandfather of Noonien Soong, Data's creator.

The Next Generation on Picard

- Brent Spiner (Data) plays Altan Inigo Soong in the first and third seasons and Adam Soong in the second season.

The Next Generation on Lower Decks

- Stephen Root (Captain K'Vada) voices Lieutenant Gene Jakoboski in the episode "Starbase 80?!".

The Next Generation on Strange New Worlds

- Jonathan Frakes (William Riker) voices the unseen director of the fictional show "The Last Frontier" in the third season episode "A Space Adventure Hour".

Deep Space Nine on The Original Series

- Rene Auberjonois (Odo) also appears as Colonel West, a human assassin disguised as a Klingon intent on assassinating the Klingon Chancellor at the Khitomer Conference.

Deep Space Nine on Voyager

- Aron Eisenberg (Nog) appears as the Kazon Kar in the episode “Initiations”
- Jeffrey Combs (Weyoun) appears as Penk and J. G. Hertzler (General Martok) appears as Hirogen Hunter in "Tsunkatse".

Deep Space Nine on Enterprise

- Jeffrey Combs (Weyoun) appears as a recurring Andorian character Thy'lek Shran, and also as the Ferengi Krem in the episode "Acquisition" alongside Ethan Phillips from Voyager.
- Rene Auberjonois (Odo) appears in the episode "Oasis" as Ezral, the chief engineer on a crashed Kantare supply ship.
- Casey Biggs (Damar) appears in the episode "Damage" as the Illyrian captain.
- J. G. Hertzler (General Martok) appears in the episodes “Judgement” and “Borderland”, as Kolos and a Klingon captain, respectively.
- Robert O'Reilly (Gowron, also recurring in The Next Generation) appears as the bounty hunter Kago-Darr in the episode “Bounty”.

Deep Space Nine on Lower Decks

- J. G. Hertzler (General Martok) appears in the episodes "Terminal Provocations" and "A Mathematically Perfect Redemption" as a Drookmoni Captain.

Voyager on The Next Generation

- Robert Duncan McNeill (Tom Paris) appears in the episode "The First Duty " as Cadet First Class Nicholas Locarno (A still of McNeill as Locarno is used as a photo of a young Paris on the desk of Admiral Owen Paris in the Voyager episode "Pathfinder")
- Ethan Phillips (Neelix) appears in the episode "Menage à Troi" as Doctor Farek and as the holographic maître d' in the film Star Trek: First Contact
- Tim Russ (Tuvok) appears in the episode "Starship Mine" as Devor. He also played an Enterprise-B Bridge Officer in the film Star Trek Generations

Voyager on Deep Space Nine

- Tim Russ (Tuvok) appears as a Klingon named T'Kar in the episode "Invasive Procedures"
- Martha Hackett (Seska) appears as the Romulan Sub Commander T'Rul in the two part episode "The Search"

Voyager on Enterprise

- Roxann Dawson (B'Elanna Torres) voices the Automated repair station in the episode "Dead Stop".
- Ethan Phillips (Neelix) appears as the ferengi Ulis in the episode "Acquisition", alongside Jeffrey Combs from Deep Space Nine.

Enterprise on Voyager

- Gary Graham (Ambassador Soval) appears as Ocampa Tanis in the episode “Cold Fire”

Discovery on Lower Decks

- Mary Chieffo (L'Rell) appears in the episode "Farewell to Farms" as K'Elarra.

Lower Decks on Starfleet Academy

- Tawny Newsome (Beckett Mariner) appears in the episode "Series Acclimation Mil" as Illa Dax.

=== Intercompany crossovers ===
Star Trek has had a few intercompany crossover stories in comic books. These include:

Marvel Comics franchise, X-Men

- Star Trek/X-Men: Star TreX – A comic book based on TOS
- Star Trek: The Next Generation/X-Men: Second Contact – A comic book based on TNG
- Star Trek: The Next Generation/X-Men: Planet X – A sequel novel to the TNG comic book

DC Comics franchise, Legion of Super-Heroes

- Star Trek – Legion of Super-Heroes

IDW Publishing, Doctor Who

- Star Trek: The Next Generation/Doctor Who: Assimilation²

Boom! Studios, Planet of the Apes

- Star Trek/Planet of the Apes: The Primate Directive

DC Comics franchise, Green Lantern

- Star Trek/Green Lantern: The Spectrum War
- Star Trek/Green Lantern: Stranger Worlds – A sequel to the first crossover.

Dark Horse Comics, Alien

- Star Trek: The Next Generation/Aliens: Acceptable Losses (cancelled)

IDW Publishing, Transformers

- Star Trek vs. Transformers

(Star Trek – Legion of Super-Heroes also reveals that DC's Vandal Savage and Flint, a mysterious immortal encountered by James T. Kirk and his crew, are actually parallel universe versions of the same person. While one version adopted the name Vandal Savage and dedicated himself to conquest, the other version adopted the name Flint and turned his life towards art and science.)

=== CCG intercompany crossover scenario ===
Lucasfilm franchise, Star Wars

- Mirror, Mirror scenario from InQuest #39 allows the crossing over of Decipher's Star Trek CCG and Star Wars CCG.

=== Parody crossovers ===
In Turkish comedy Turist Ömer Uzay Yolunda (Turkish: Ömer the Tourist in Star Trek), produced and directed by Hulki Saner, titular hobo (cult Turkish character, Turist Ömer played by Sadri Alışık) is beamed aboard the Starship Enterprise.

In Polish cabaret sketch of Kabaret Moralnego Niepokoju (Polish: Cabaret of Moral Anxiety) - Bajki: Przygody pilota Pirxa, titular hero (taken from Stanisław Lem Tales of Pirx the Pilot), and his companions, wears TNG era Starfleet uniforms. Star Trek style technobabble is also in use.

== See also ==
- "The Slaver Weapon", an episode of The Animated Series, a crossover between Star Trek and Larry Niven's Known Space setting.
