= Reginald Barclay =

Recurring Star Trek character

- Star Trek character
- Schultz as Barclay in "Hollow Pursuits"
- First appearance: "Hollow Pursuits"; The Next Generation; April 30, 1990
- Last appearance: "Endgame"; Voyager; May 23, 2001
- Created by: Sarah Higley; Gene Roddenberry
- Portrayed by: Dwight Schultz

In-universe information
- Full name: Reginald Endicott Barclay III
- Nicknames: Broccoli, Reg
- Occupation: Engineer
- Affiliation: Starfleet

Reginald Endicott Barclay III is a fictional engineer from the Star Trek media franchise. On television and in film, he has been portrayed by Dwight Schultz since the character's introduction in the Star Trek: The Next Generation third season episode "Hollow Pursuits". Schultz played the character for five episodes and one feature film (Star Trek: First Contact) of The Next Generation, as well as six episodes of the series Star Trek: Voyager. Barclay also appears in non-canon Star Trek novels and video games.

Schultz was cast in The Next Generation thanks to Whoopi Goldberg (Guinan). Initially disappointed not to be playing an alien character, Schultz never anticipated becoming such a fan-favorite. Barclay underwent changes from, as first conceived, a malicious character—someone that aggravated the crew to compensate for his inferiority complex—to the softer and more benign engineer that made it to air. Schultz and others saw Barclay as a tribute to the average Star Trek fan, though the producers said that was unintentional.

During The Next Generation's televised run, Barclay was stationed aboard the USS Enterprise (NCC-1701-D). He was then posted at the Jupiter Station Holoprogramming Center before being aboard the Enterprise-E for the events of Star Trek: First Contact. For his season six and seven Star Trek: Voyager appearances, Barclay was assigned to the Pathfinder Project, a Starfleet Communications endeavor to communicate with the USS Voyager stranded in the Delta Quadrant.

== Conception ==
University of Rochester professor Sarah Higley created Reginald Barclay in her script for the Star Trek: The Next Generation third-season episode "Hollow Pursuits". Before writing the script, Higley knew that she wanted to write about the less-exceptional members of the Enterprise crew, saying, "I thought there wasn't enough emphasis on the less outstanding, less wunderkind-like crew members." She described her initial conception of Barclay as "a repulsive guy […] wrapped up in himself, brilliant in his field, [and] socially a wash-out." She gave him the pompous name Endicott Reginald Barclay III to suggest he "had always suffered from an inferiority complex and just couldn't deal with the ultra-maturity and shining qualities of the rest of the crew." Higley based Barclay on Till Eulenspiegel, a prankster from German folklore: the original Barclay pranked the crew, taunted them about their weaknesses, and called their bluff before being sent to a psychiatric hospital.

Paramount bought "Hollow Pursuits" within a week of Higley's submission, but wanted to change the script to make Barclay save the day while being less acerbic and sarcastic. Higley would later recall how she had made Barclay "repugnant" while the studio wanted somebody with whom the audience could identify: someone "whose stuttering, shyness and lack of self-confidence would speak to [the] shy and socially maladjusted." As the character's actor, Dwight Schultz described Barclay as a ground-breaking character in terms of his normal fallibility. In the British magazine, TV Zone, Schultz thanked Roddenberry for creating the character, saying, "He realized that that type of character was missing from the programme and, eventually, said, 'Let's fill that spot.'"

In a script for "Hollow Pursuits", Barclay is described as a "shy individual with a perpetual frown born of stress and unhappiness between his brows. […] What we notice most about him is that he is uncomfortable around other people to the point of agony… he rarely makes eye contact… when he speaks, he hesitates, desperately afraid of saying the wrong thing… which he occasionally does."

== Casting ==
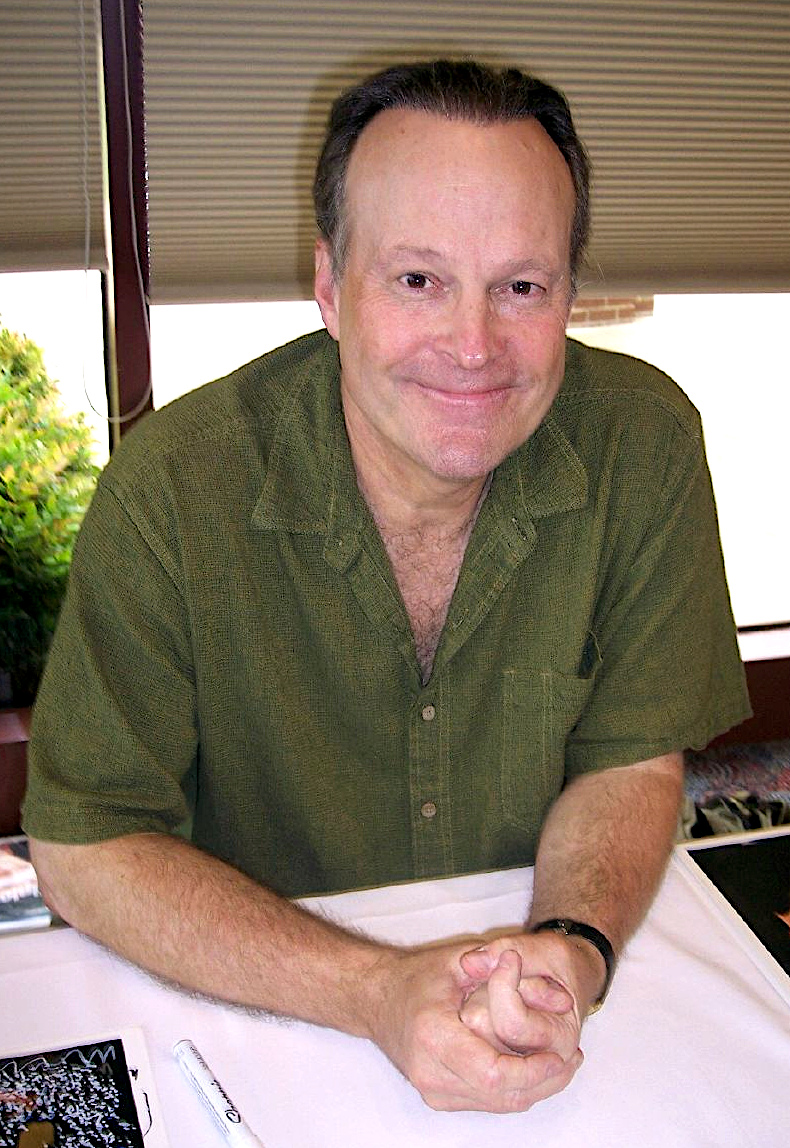
Dwight Schultz (April 2006)

Schultz was a fan of the original Star Trek; it was the first television series he watched in color. Schultz would wait for each episode to air, and then meet with friends after school to discuss the themes and plot of each one. The Next Generation showrunner Michael Piller recalled that sometime prior to casting Schultz, the actor had told executive producer Rick Berman that he would love to appear on the show. Schultz himself credits Whoopi Goldberg (Guinan) with his opportunity to play Barclay. In 1990, Schultz was working with Goldberg on The Long Walk Home when he discussed with her that he was a big fan of The Next Generation and knew Brent Spiner (Data) and Jonathan Frakes (William Riker) from his time in New York City. Then, approximately a month after returning from The Long Walk Home, Schultz heard from his talent manager that the powers-that-be at The Next Generation had extended a job offer. Piller and Berman did not think they would actually be able to land Schultz for the spot because the actor had done Fat Man and Little Boy with Paul Newman and "was very hot". Schultz anticipated playing "a large vein-throbbing, bulbous-headed alien," and was initially disappointed to be offered Barclay instead. Schultz thought Barclay was going to be merely a one-off character, and did not anticipate it becoming a recurring gig.

== Character history ==
=== Canon ===
In the Star Trek canon, Barclay has appeared in twelve discrete productions from 1990 to 2001.

==== Lieutenant, junior grade ====
In his inaugural appearance in The Next Generation's third season episode "Hollow Pursuits", Lieutenant Junior Grade Barclay is addicted to using the holodeck and recreates the crew of the Enterprise-D on the holodeck with attributes and in settings which allow him to more easily interact with them. Crewmembers find him difficult to work with, and Wesley calls him "Broccoli" behind his back. Counselor Deanna Troi (Marina Sirtis) and Guinan (Whoopi Goldberg) both support Barclay in escaping to his fantasies, though Troi is annoyed to later find herself recreated as "the Goddess of Empathy", in what Dr. Lynne Joyrich—Brown University professor of modern culture and media—describes as "[him interpreting] a clear sexual invitation". Despite his embarrassment, Barclay saves the Enterprise, "gaining both self-confidence and a newfound respect from his peers as a result."

For the fourth season, bringing back Barclay was on executive producer Michael Piller's to-do list, but they were having trouble finding a vehicle for the character; they did not want to return to the well again for the "nervous chap in the holodeck". Joe Menosky wrote "The Nth Degree" about a crew member who becomes superintelligent, and it was suggested that they could slot Barclay into that role. Barclay is affected by an alien space probe which induces the superintelligence. Under the influence of the probe, he modifies the ship extensively and propels it to the center of the Milky Way galaxy. After losing his heightened intelligence, Barclay explains that it was the probe's creators who impelled his actions as a way of meeting new species.

Barclay returns in the season six episode "Realm of Fear". It is revealed that Barclay is phobic about using the transporter, an aspect of the character that was derived from episode writer Brannon Braga's own fear of flying. After transporting back from another vessel (the USS Yosemite), Barclay insists he sees creatures in the matter stream. Overcoming his fears, Barclay is repeatedly transported until he grabs hold of one of the creatures which turns out to be a missing crew member from the Yosemite.

In the second season's "Elementary, Dear Data", a troublemaking self-aware holoprogram of Professor Moriarty (Daniel Davis) was accidentally created and then stored in long-term memory at the end of the episode. That episode's sequel, season six's "Ship in a Bottle", finds Barclay inadvertently releasing Moriarty, who wrests control of the Enterprise by trapping Picard, Data, and Barclay inside nested holodecks. Barclay was included because it was initially felt that the episode needed a character ignorant of season two events. Though this characteristic was ultimately unnecessary, episode writer René Echevarria opined that only Barclay could have pulled off the episode's final moment where Barclay momentarily questions whether he was still in a simulated reality.

Season seven's "Genesis" was Barclay's last episodic appearance on The Next Generation. After Barclay comes down with the Urodelan flu, the attempted cure accidentally becomes a virus, spreading among and devolving the crew. Episode writer Brannon Braga described choosing to devolve Barclay into a spider as the natural choice: "I just thought it would be fun to make Barclay a spider because I can't imagine anything more awful to become. It just seemed natural since he's a kind of nervous and wiry guy, that maybe he would have had more arachnid ancestors than" other crewmembers. After Captain Jean-Luc Picard (Patrick Stewart) and Data (Brent Spiner) cure the afflicted, Doctor Beverly Crusher (Gates McFadden) names the virus "Barclay's Protomorphosis Syndrome".

Schultz next appeared as Barclay in Star Trek: Voyager's second season episode "Projections". Originally, the guest star was going to be The Next Generation's LeVar Burton as Geordi La Forge, but episode writer Brannon Braga decided it would be much more fun to couple Barclay with the Doctor (Robert Picardo), holographic software called the Emergency Medical Hologram (EMH). In "Projections", Barclay is a delusion of the Doctor's program, trying to convince the Doctor that he was not a hologram but instead a flesh-and-blood being running a simulation of the Voyager and its crew. According to the Star Trek: Voyager Companion, Barclay was a part of the original engineering team at the Jupiter Station Holoprogramming Center that developed the Emergency Medical Hologram (EMH), and that Barclay himself was in charge of testing the program's social skills. The Companion further infers that Barclay took a leave of absence from the Enterprise to work on the EMH because the character is aboard the Enterprise-E in the 1996 film, Star Trek: First Contact.

Barclay was not originally supposed to be in the feature film Star Trek: First Contact; it was director Jonathan Frakes who suggested including Barclay as opposed to "a new lieutenant character". Schultz was contacted on a Tuesday, asked if he could come in that Friday, and the actor said, "Sure". In his only scene, Barclay uses an interaction with La Forge as an excuse to meet Zefram Cochrane (James Cromwell) and shake his hand.

==== Lieutenant ====
Following the events of First Contact, in Star Trek: Voyager's sixth season episode "Pathfinder", now-Lieutenant Barclay has been stationed on Earth for two years. He is assigned to Starfleet Communications' Pathfinder Project, the mission of which is reestablishing contact with the lost USS Voyager. After becoming obsessed with his holographic recreation of the Voyager and her crew, Barclay seeks counseling with the visiting Deanna Troi. Despite her urgings, Barclay disobeys orders from his supervisor (Richard McGonagle) to test an unproven theory. After being caught by security officers, Barclay's theory pans out, and all is forgiven as Starfleet briefly communicates with Voyager personnel for the first time since the fourth season episode "Message in a Bottle".

Barclay returns to the Jupiter Station Holoprogramming Center in "Life Line" to liaise between the Doctor and his programmer, Lewis Zimmerman (also portrayed by Robert Picardo). Barclay again enlists Counselor Troi's help to convince Zimmerman to allow the Doctor to treat him for an as-yet untreatable illness; Zimmerman is dismissive of the Doctor's abilities and expertise because that generation of the EMH software was decommissioned by Starfleet as unfit. When psychotherapy fails, Barclay sabotages the Doctor's program to force Zimmerman to come to terms with his creation; though Zimmerman uncovers Barclay's subterfuge, he successfully repairs the holoprogram and consents to treatment.

Prior to the events of season seven's "Inside Man", Barclay has been tinkering with holography again, developing interactive holograms of himself to send to the Voyager. After it appears that the holographic program has failed to reach Voyager for a second month in a row, Barclay intrudes on Troi's vacation to confide in her that he believes his ex-girlfriend (Sharisse Baker-Bernard) may have something to do with it. It is uncovered that Barclay was a patsy and that Ferengi have commandeered his holoprogram to lead the Voyager to its doom so that they can profit from Seven of Nine's (Jeri Ryan) Borg technology. Barclay tricks the Ferengi in the guise of his hologram and defuses the situation.

Schultz appears as Barclay again in the Voyager episode "Author, Author". With the help of Harry Kim (Garrett Wang) and Seven of Nine, Barclay achieves live communication between Earth and the Voyager for eleven minutes a day. Later, Barclay alerts Admiral Paris (Richard Herd) to the distribution of the Doctor's holonovel.

In the Star Trek: Voyager series finale "Endgame", Schultz appears as Barclay both in the series' future (2404) and in the series' present (2378). In the future he is Commander Barclay, and a lecturer at Starfleet Academy who provides an aged Admiral Janeway (Kate Mulgrew) with data and a shuttlecraft she will need to travel back in time. In this future, Barclay has overcome his stuttering except when under stress. In the present, Barclay is present alongside Admiral Paris at Starfleet Communications when the Voyager returns home to Earth.

=== Non-canon appearances ===
Barclay also appears in several officially-licensed, non-canon, Star Trek novels, e-books, short stories, and comics:

==== Star Trek ====
- "Doctors Three" by Charles Skaggs (1999)

==== Star Trek: The Next Generation ====
- "The Way of the Warrior" by Michael Jan Friedman (1992)
- Imzadi by Peter David (1992)
- Dark Mirror by Diane Duane (1993)
- Here There Be Dragons by John Peel (1993)
- Sins of Commission by Susan Wright (1994)
- Q-Squared by Peter David (1994)
- Requiem by Michael Jan Friedman and Kevin Ryan (1994)
- "Suspect" by Michael Jan Friedman (1995)
- Crossover by Michael Jan Friedman (1995)
- Infiltrator by W.R. Thompson (1996)
- The Death of Princes by John Peel (1997)
- Planet X by Michael Jan Friedman (1998)
- The Best and the Brightest by Susan Wright (1998)
- "The Naked Truth" by Jerry M. Wolfe (1998)
- "See Spot Run" by Kathy Oltion (1998)
- "What Went Through Data's Mind 0.68 Seconds Before the Satellite Hit" by Dylan Otto Krider (1998)
- Q-Space by Greg Cox (1998)
- "Calculated Risk" by Christina F. York (1999)
- Gemworld by John Vornholt (2000)
- "Out of the Box, Thinking" by Jerry M. Wolfe (2000)
- The Killing Shadows (November 2000 – February 2001)
- Tooth and Claw by Doranna Durgin (2001)
- Rogue by Michael A. Martin and Andy Mangels (2001)
- Immortal Coil by Jeffrey Lang (2002)
- "Thinking of You" by Greg Cox (2007)
- The Oppressor's Wrong by Phaedra M. Weldon (2007)
- That Sleep of Death by Terri Osborne (2008)
- "Valued Intelligence" by Scott & David Tipton (2008)
- Indistinguishable from Magic by David A. McIntee (2011)
- The Light Fantastic by Jeffrey Lang (2014)

==== Star Trek: Voyager ====
- Homecoming by Christie Golden (2003)
- The Farther Shore by Christie Golden (2003)
- Full Circle by Kirsten Beyer (2009)
- Unworthy by Kirsten Beyer (2009)
- Children of the Storm by Kirsten Beyer (2011)
- The Eternal Tide by Kirsten Beyer (2012)
- Protectors by Kirsten Beyer (2014)
- Acts of Contrition by Kirsten Beyer (2014)
- Atonement by Kirsten Beyer (2015)
- A Pocket Full of Lies by Kirsten Beyer (2016)
- Architects of Infinity by Kirsten Beyer (2018)
- To Lose the Earth by Kirsten Beyer (2018)

==== Starfleet Corps of Engineers ====
- Enigma Ship by J. Steven York and Christina F. York (2002)

Barclay also appears in the Star Trek video game Star Trek: Elite Force II (2003), where he is voiced by Schultz.

== Analysis ==
Describing the character as "an average person who was fallible [and] prone to mistakes," Schultz thought Barclay was quite unlike any previous Star Trek character. Schultz was surprised to be asked back to The Next Generation for "The Nth Degree" in season four, not realizing how popular the character was with fans. After Patrick Stewart (Jean-Luc Picard) insisted that he join the convention circuit, Schultz was "overwhelmed" by the reaction: "[People] really do identify with Barclay because he has difficulties. He's not the super-perfect Starfleet officer you often see on Star Trek, and the audience loves him because of that."

I immediately identified him as a Star Trek fan. If you put a fan on the Enterprise bridge they would probably behave just like Barclay. I love the character.

— Dwight Schultz

In Star Trek: First Contact, Schultz relished playing Barclay as the character he had always envisioned him to be: "a fan. In his case, he was the ultimate fan of the scientist who invented warp drive." Authors Lynne Joyrich and Robin Roberts, and "Hollow Pursuits" writer Sarah Higley all came to the same conclusion as Schultz: that Barclay is meant to be a mirror to the Star Trek fan, with Higley saying, "Barclay is a Star Trek fan, making these wonderful Star Trek characters in the Holodeck say and do whatever he wants them to do." In the book The Influence of Star Trek on Television, Film and Culture, Sue Short goes even further, suggesting Barclay is a Mary Sue. The authors describe Barclay as an "archetypal Trek-nerd, opting to exist in a fantasy world due to inadequacies that prevent him from fully engaging with the real one." Writing about Barclay's introduction in "Hollow Pursuits", the character seems to endorse a perception of fans as "psychologically disordered" or "dangerously delusional". Both showrunner Michael Piller and director Cliff Bole disagree with the perception that Barclay was meant to represent "self-absorbed Trek fans who are so obsessed with the show that they are oblivious to reality." Piller felt "Hollow Pursuits" was more about the theme of 'fantasy versus reality' while Bole felt the audience would instead be attracted to the holodeck vignettes such as The Three Musketeers allusion.

In his analysis of stuttering in visual media for The Journal of Popular Culture, PhD candidate Jeffrey K. Johnson puts forward that stuttering is a sort of "storytelling shorthand" for nervous and weak characters. Barclay is portrayed not simply as a person who stutters, but a "shy, backward, phobic" hypochondriac whose stuttering is a symptom of these deficiencies. "On a starship filled with courageous and often heroic personnel[,] the one character that is shown to have multiple anxieties and weaknesses is also the one who stutters." In "Endgame", when Barclay becomes confident and assertive in the future, he has also stopped stuttering. Johnson contrasts this depiction of stuttering with The Next Generation's depiction of other disabled characters: Geordi La Forge (LeVar Burton) is blind, but nonetheless capable and heroic, and Riva (Howie Seago)—from the episode "Loud as a Whisper"—is deaf, yet "is revered for his strong character and excellent communication skills."

Terry L. Shepherd, a professor of special education at Indiana University South Bend, wrote in Teaching Exceptional Children about how showing disabled children likewise disabled Star Trek characters can improve their situations at school. Shepherd uses Barclay as an example of this, stating how even though the character does not completely overcome his social anxiety disorder by the end of "Hollow Pursuits", he has made steps towards improving his self-confidence.

In discussing Star Trek: The Experience and its emphasis on the masculine aspects of Star Trek for the academic journal Extrapolation, Robin Roberts notes how the holodeck-centric episodes of The Next Generation focus on men using the simulator. Roberts goes on to say that when Barclay "is no longer in control of his holodeck simulations, [he] is feminized and faces being fired from Starfleet." Roberts also explains how Barclay is intended to be not only "[a] stand-in for Star Trek fans", but also representing both Experience participants and home viewers "who are not in control of the fantasy narrative".

In The Influence of Star Trek on Television, Film and Culture, Sue Short described Barclay as "the most improbable member of Starfleet" due to his propensity for daydreaming and solitary pursuits. Yet it is Barclay's outside-the-box thinking that saves the day more than once.

== Reception ==
In 2016, Wired ranked Barclay 55 out of their top 100 most-important Star Trek crewmembers. IndieWire ranked the crew of Star Trek: The Next Generation in 2017, and Barclay was number 16 of 17, ranking only higher than season two's Katherine Pulaski. When Comic Book Resources ranked Star Trek's best 20 recurring characters in 2018, Barclay was sixth behind Sarek, Lwaxana Troi, Dukat, Elim Garak, and Q. Syfy Wire ranked Barclay 10th on their 2019 list of 21 best supporting characters. That same year, Screen Rant placed Barclay ninth in their list of the ten smartest Star Trek characters, ahead of Seven of Nine.

The character of Barclay was well received by fans, a number of whom made websites in his honor. A Star Trek: Voyager Barclay action figure was originally limited to 1,701 pieces, but after fan outcry was increased to 3,000.
