= Lynn Fuchs =

Educational psychologist

- Citizenship: U.S. citizen
- Occupation: Professor of Education
- Spouse: Douglas Fuchs
- Awards: AERA Distinguished Contributions to Research in Education Award (2014)

Academic background
- Education: Johns Hopkins University, University of Pennsylvania, University of Minnesota

Lynn Fuchs (née Shteir; January, 1950–May 7, 2025) was an educational psychologist known for research on instructional practice and assessment, reading disabilities, and mathematics disabilities. She was the Dunn Family Chair in Psychoeducational Assessment in the Department of Special Education at Vanderbilt University and affiliated with the American Institutes for Research.

Fuchs was featured in Forbes Magazine in 2009 as one of 14 "revolutionary educators" nationwide. In 2013, she was awarded with the Kauffman-Hallahan Distinguished Researcher Award, presented by the Division of Research of The Council for Exceptional Children and Routledge Press, for research leading to more effective services for children and youth with disabilities. In 2014, Fuchs and her husband Douglas Fuchs received the American Educational Research Association (AERA) Distinguished Contributions to Research in Education Award. In 2015, she was invited to the White House as part of the Individuals with Disabilities Education Act 40th anniversary.

Fuchs was co-author of Learning disabilities: From identification to intervention published in 2007. She co-edited the book Response to Intervention: A Framework for Reading Educators published in 2008.

== Biography ==
Lynn Shteir was born in Monmouth, NJ. She completed a B.A. in liberal arts at Johns Hopkins University in 1972, and a M.S. in elementary education at the University of Pennsylvania Graduate School of Education in 1973. She continued her education at the University of Minnesota, where she received an Ed.S. in educational psychology in 1977 and a Ph.D. in educational psychology in 1981. She was a postdoctoral associate from 1981 to 1983 at the University of Minnesota Institute for Research on Learning Disabilities. Fuchs was an assistant professor at Wheelock College (1981–1985) prior to joining the faculty of Vanderbilt University in 1985. Her research has been supported by grants from the National Institute of Child Health & Human Development.

Fuchs has served on the editorial boards of various journals including the Journal of Educational Psychology, Scientific Studies of Reading, Reading Research Quarterly, Elementary School Journal, Journal of Learning Disabilities, and Exceptional Children.

== Research ==
Fuchs and her research team aimed to identify instructional methods, including tutoring, that improve learning outcomes for students with learning disabilities in reading and mathematics. She has promoted use of formative assessment to enhance instructional effectiveness, and advocates for educational approaches that use responsiveness to intervention to identify children with persistent difficulties. Other research has focused on identifying cognitive profiles associated with math and reading difficulties, which may include slower processing speed or inattention.

Fuchs and her colleagues received the 1998 AERA Palmer O. Johnson Award for their paper "Peer-assisted learning strategies: Making classrooms more responsive to diversity." This study demonstrated the effectiveness of a 15-week peer tutoring program for enhancing reading success in elementary school classrooms.

In 2015, Fuchs and her colleagues were awarded the International Literacy Association’s Albert J. Harris Research Award for their paper "Efficacy of a first-grade responsiveness-to-intervention prevention model for struggling readers" published in Reading Research Quarterly. This paper indicated significant gains in first-grade reading for children assigned to a small-group supplemental tutoring program after being identified as non-responders to standard reading instruction.

Fuchs and her co-author Sarah Powell received the 2016 Samuel A. Kirk Award from the Division of Learning Disabilities of the Council for Exceptional Children for their paper "Intensive intervention in mathematics" published in Learning Disabilities Research and Practice. This paper describes evidence-based individualized approaches to instruction for students who exhibit persistent difficulties in mathematics.

== Representative publications ==
- Fuchs, D.; Fuchs, L. S. (2006). "Introduction to response to intervention: What, why, and how valid is it?". Reading Research Quarterly. 41 (1): 93–99. doi:10.1598/rrq.41.1.4.
- Fuchs, L. S.; Fuchs, D.; Compton, D. L.; Powell, S. R.; Seethaler, P. M.; Capizzi, A. M.; Fletcher, J. M. (2006). "The cognitive correlates of third-grade skill in arithmetic, algorithmic computation, and arithmetic word problems". Journal of Educational Psychology. 98 (1): 29–43. doi:10.1037/0022-0663.98.1.29.
- Fuchs, L. S.; Fuchs, D.; Hosp, M. K.; Jenkins, J. R. (2001). "Oral reading fluency as an indicator of reading competence: A theoretical, empirical, and historical analysis". Scientific Studies of Reading. 5 (3): 239–256. doi:10.1207/S1532799XSSR0503_3. S2CID 15363636.
- Fuchs, L. S.; Hamlett, D. F.; Stecker, P. M. (1991). "Effects of Curriculum-Based Measurement and Consultation on Teacher Planning and Student Achievement in Mathematics Operations". American Educational Research Journal. 28 (3): 617–641. doi:10.3102/00028312028003617. S2CID 145341912.
- Fletcher, J. M., Lyon, G. R., Fuchs, L. S., & Barnes, M. A. (2018). Learning disabilities: From identification to intervention. Guilford Publications.
