= Inside Man (Star Trek: Voyager) =

- Star Trek: Voyager episode
- Episode no.: Season 7 Episode 6
- Directed by: Allan Kroeker
- Written by: Robert Doherty
- Production code: 252
- Original air date: November 8, 2000

Guest appearances
- Dwight Schultz - Reginald Barclay/Holo-Barclay; Marina Sirtis - Deanna Troi; Richard Herd - Admiral Paris; Richard McGonagle - Commander Harkins; Frank Corsentino - Gegis; Christopher Neiman - Yeggie; Michael William Rivkin - Nunk; Sharisse Baker-Bernard - Leosa; Brooke Averi - Little Girl #1; Lindsey Parks- Little Girl #2

Episode chronology
← Previous "Critical Care"	Next → "Body and Soul"
- Star Trek: Voyager season 7

Inside Man is the 152nd episode of the science fiction television series Star Trek: Voyager, and the sixth episode of its seventh season. This continues the story arc previously established in "Pathfinder" and "Life Line", Voyager episodes featuring the Star Trek franchise characters Reginald Barclay and Deanna Troi.

Like "Pathfinder", the episode also has scenes with Tom Paris' father Admiral Paris. It further develops Barclay's character and introduces one of his romantic interests, Leosa. Barclay's relationship with his overbearing commander on the Pathfinder project, Commander Harkins, is also further developed.

Dwight Schultz acts as two different characters, Barclay and the hologram based on Barclay.

== Casting ==
This episode featured a holographic Reginald Barclay, played by Trek veteran actor Dwight Schultz. Barclay is noted as one of the best recurring characters of all Star Trek.

== Plot ==
Voyager receives its monthly datastream from Starfleet via the Pathfinder project, which has been helping Voyager find a way home from the Delta Quadrant. In the stream, they find the programming for a hologram and discover it is a simulation of Reginald Barclay, one of the Starfleet officers working on Pathfinder. Holo-Barclay explains that Starfleet has found a way to return Voyager home through a geodesic fold between two red giants, but this will require special shield modifications and inoculations for the crew to survive the trip. The Doctor allows Holo-Barclay to use his mobile emitter as to supervise the work, and tries to be friends with him, but Holo-Barclay seems intent on his duty. Holo-Barclay even ignores the concerns the Doctor puts forward about the effectiveness of the inoculations, putting the Doctor on edge. The Doctor tells Captain Kathryn Janeway of his concerns, who orders a check of the Holo-Barclay program but finds nothing amiss. They continue to prepare the ship, while Holo-Barclay sends back reports included in Voyager's datastream.

Meanwhile, on Earth, the real Barclay has attempted to send his hologram to Voyager with their datastream, but finds it fails both times. He suspects that someone is intercepting the signal, but without proof, his supervisors order him to take a vacation. Barclay laments his failure to Counselor Deanna Troi, as well as that his current girlfriend Leosa left him recently. In talking to her, Barclay comes to realize that Leosa left him the same day he tried to send his hologram and suspects she might have been responsible. Barclay and Troi confront Leosa, who admits to having worked with the Ferengi to hijack Barclay's hologram and modify its programming before being sent to Voyager, so they will be able to steal Seven of Nine's Borg nanoprobes. Barclay is disappointed to learn that Leosa is a dabo girl, not a teacher as she professed. They report this to Admiral Paris, who orders the Carolina to intercept the Ferengi ship, based on Leosa's information.

En route, Barclay discovers that the Ferengi plan to bring Voyager to the Alpha Quadrant will work, but the process, with the given shield modifications and inoculations, will kill the crew, allowing the Ferengi freedom to steal the nanoprobes. With the Carolina unlikely to reach the Ferengi in time, Barclay tricks the Ferengi into believing that he is their Holo-Barclay. He claims that Voyager discovered that the shield modifications were designed to kill them and have instead reconfigured their shields to allow them to survive the journey through the fold and subsequently kill anyone they find on the opposite side. The Ferengi are frightened at this and begin to close down the fold. On the opposite side of the fold where Voyager waits, Holo-Barclay sees the fold closing. In a last-ditch attempt, he abducts Seven of Nine and attempts to enter the fold using an escape pod, but he and Seven are beamed back to Voyager before the escape pod reaches the Ferengi ship.

With Voyager resuming course for home and the situation with the modified Holo-Barclay settled, the real Barclay begins to rework his hologram with additional security features. Troi arrives and invites Barclay on a double date with her and William Riker, hoping to introduce him to a teacher friend that she knows.

== Home media releases ==
On December 21, 2003, this episode was released on DVD as part of a Season 7 boxset; Star Trek Voyager: Complete Seventh Season.

== See also ==
- "False Profits" (an earlier Voyager episode featuring the Ferengi)

Barclay and Troi shows:

- "Pathfinder"
- "Life Line"
