= The Voyager Conspiracy =

- Star Trek: Voyager episode
- Episode no.: Season 6 Episode 9
- Directed by: Terry Windell
- Written by: Joe Menosky
- Production code: 229
- Original air date: November 24, 1999

Guest appearances
- Albie Selznick - Tash; Scarlett Pomers - Naomi Wildman

Episode chronology
← Previous "One Small Step"	Next → "Pathfinder"
- Star Trek: Voyager season 6

"The Voyager Conspiracy" is the 129th episode of the science fiction television series Star Trek: Voyager, the ninth episode of the sixth season. It is the only episode whose title features the word "Voyager". In this science fiction story, a cybernetic crew member has behavioral problems after experimenting with her database. Seven of Nine, played by actress Jeri Ryan, takes the spotlight in this episode, in a story that explores the relationship between data and conclusions.

"The Voyager Conspiracy" was first broadcast on United Paramount Network (UPN) on November 25, 1999.

== Plot ==
Seven of Nine decides to increase the amount of information she receives from the ship's database by directly assimilating as much of Voyager's data as possible. This allows her to draw conclusions from varied sources of data and find bugs in one of the systems. Meanwhile, the ship encounters an alien who has constructed a catapult capable of throwing a ship several hundred light years in a few hours. The crew of Voyager help him repair his array, with hopes that if they make the trip successfully they can then use it to shorten their trip home.

Seven of Nine downloads the data about the catapult, but she begins to exhibit paranoid behavior. She uses evidence concerning possible spatial-warp technology developments to convince Chakotay that Janeway might be spearheading a Federation presence in the Delta Quadrant. Although skeptical, Chakotay delays the shield modifications necessary for the catapult trip so he can examine the evidence himself.

After another regeneration/assimilation cycle, Seven has a new conclusion. She uses most of the same evidence, but this time with added incidents involving Chakotay to support her findings to convince Janeway that Chakotay might be spearheading a power grab for the Maquis with the same technology. (Seven states that Seska impregnated herself with Chakotay's DNA but in Season 3, Episode 1, the Doctor reveals that Chatokay is not the father.)

The two end up comparing stories and they realize Seven is acting irrationally. The Doctor determines that Seven has downloaded more information than she can handle.

Seven then starts suspecting a third conspiracy: that the aim of the last five years was actually to grab a Borg drone, herself. Seven steals the Delta Flyer in order to escape from Voyager. Janeway manages to beam aboard. She convinces Seven that she is ill and she returns to Voyager for treatment.

The crew successfully uses the alien's catapult to travel closer to the Alpha Quadrant, cutting three years off their journey.

== Reception ==
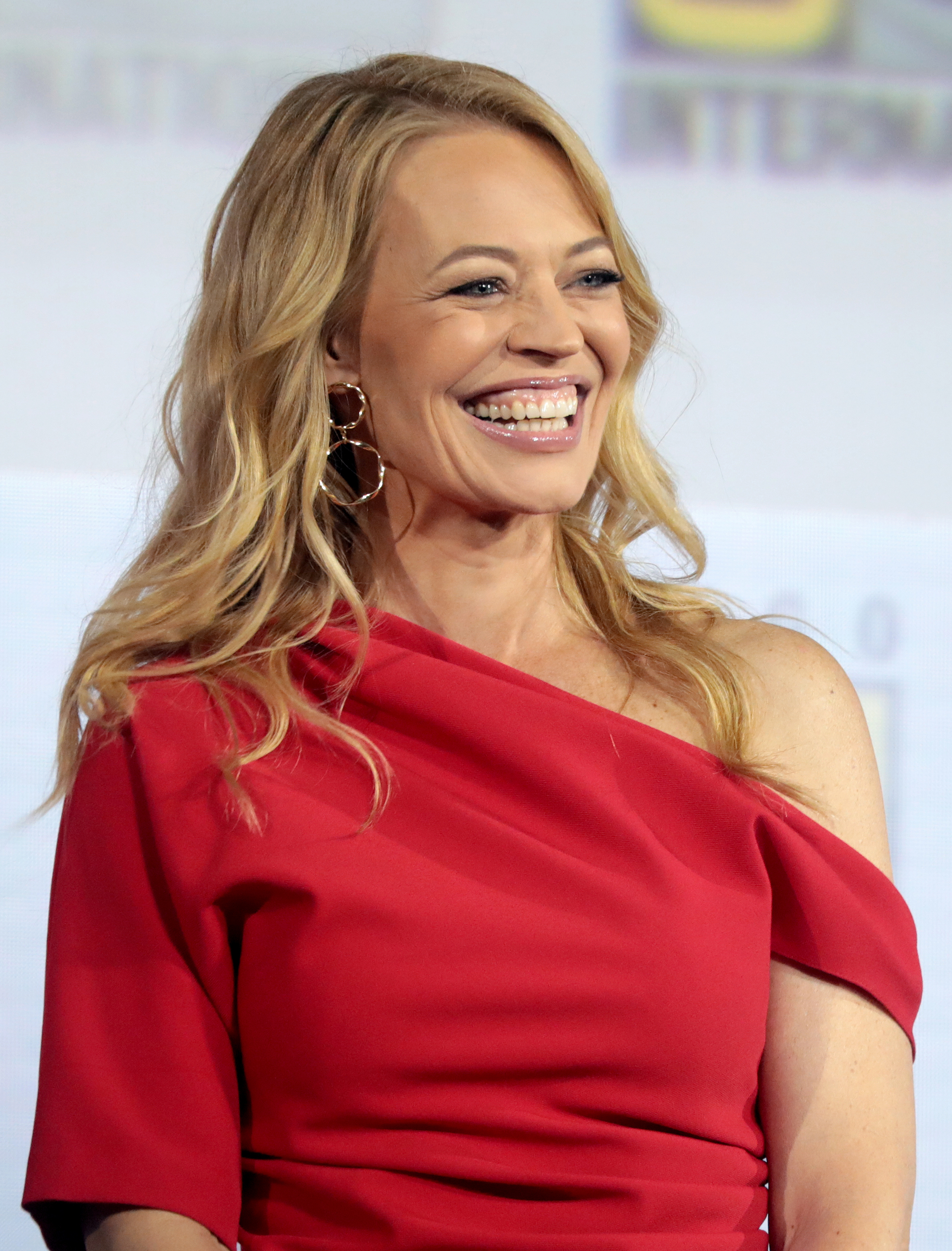
Award-winning actress Jeri Ryan takes on the role of "Seven of Nine"

In their 2011 review of Star Trek: Voyager episodes, titled I Like my Coffee Black and My Crew Lost, Tor.com this was one of six episodes that were highlighted for being good for re-watches. They point out a triple combination of acting by Jeri Ryan, interesting Seven of Nine plot, and real-world encouragement for depicting someone overwhelmed with information.

This episode may be a commentary on the conspiracy theories according to the book The Paranormal and the Paranoid: Conspiratorial Science Fiction Television. Alternatively, the book suggests that it was depiction of the character Seven of Nine experiencing paranoia. They note that Seven also struggles with psychological problems in the episode "One".

In the book Star Trek: The Human Frontier, they noted this episode as example of exploring a mental illness on the show, in this case they thought it was a depiction of schizophrenia.

In 2019, ScreenRant noted this episode as one of the top ten Voyager plot twists, and was impressed by the message. They thought the moral message was that "anyone, no matter how smart they think they are, can draw a conclusion out of a pile of circumstances and be utterly wrong."

== Releases ==
This episode was released as part of a season 6 DVD boxset on December 7, 2004.
