= Sarah Powell =

American scholar of education

Sarah Rannells Powell is an American scholar of education focusing on special education and learning disabilities in mathematics education. She is a professor in the Department of Special Education at the University of Texas at Austin, holder of the Audrey Rogers Myers Centennial Professorship in Education, and associate director of the Meadows Center for Preventing Educational Risk. She has been a strong advocate for the use of traditional education in mathematics and for the use of educational research to evaluate the effectiveness of mathematics education techniques.

== Education and career ==
Powell majored in elementary education at Centre College in Danville, Kentucky, and received a master's degree in education, focusing on school administration, from Vanderbilt University in 2001. She worked as a schoolteacher in Danville and Nashville, Tennessee, as a special education teacher at Vanderbilt, and as an educational consultant, while continuing her own graduate education; she completed her Ph.D. at Vanderbilt in 2009.

After postdoctoral research at Vanderbilt, she joined the University of Virginia as an assistant professor in 2011. She moved to the University of Texas at Austin in 2013 and was tenured as an associate professor there in 2018. She was promoted to full professor in 2024.

== Recognition ==
Fuchs and her co-author Lynn Fuchs received the 2016 Samuel A. Kirk Award from the Division of Learning Disabilities of the Council for Exceptional Children for their paper "Intensive intervention in mathematics" published in Learning Disabilities Research and Practice.

Powell was a 2019 recipient of the Presidential Early Career Award for Scientists and Engineers. The University of Texas gave her the Audrey Rogers Myers Centennial Professorship in Education in 2024.
