= The Haunting of Deck Twelve =

- Star Trek: Voyager episode
- Episode no.: Season 6 Episode 25
- Directed by: David Livingston
- Story by: Mike Sussman
- Teleplay by: Mike Sussman; Kenneth Biller; Bryan Fuller
- Production code: 245
- Original air date: May 17, 2000

Guest appearances
- Manu Intiraymi - Icheb; Marley S. McClean - Mezoti; Kurt Wetherill - Azan; Cody Wetherill - Rebi; Zoe McLellan - Tal Celes; Neil Norman - Bridge Officer

Episode chronology
← Previous "Life Line"	Next → "Unimatrix Zero, Part I"
- Star Trek: Voyager season 6

"The Haunting of Deck Twelve" is the 145th episode of Star Trek: Voyager, the penultimate episode of the sixth season. Neelix tells a story, while trapped with the ex-Borg children during a power outage aboard the USS Voyager, a Starfleet vessel stranded on the opposite side of the galaxy.

== Plot ==
A planned power outage causes the Borg children to wake from their regeneration cycles, much to their surprise. Neelix is there to comfort them. The children wonder if this incident has anything to do with a highly restricted area on Deck 12. After all Naomi Wildman has told them, Mezoti thinks a ghost is present there. Voyager is shown drifting into a nebula.

Neelix proceeds to distract them with a story they only partially believe, concerning an entity that was accidentally taken in by Voyager. This story allegedly takes place a short period before the Borg children had come aboard the ship, so they do not know if it is true.

After Voyager leaves the nebula, they experience many system's malfunctions, first annoyances then more serious. Navigation and communications become completely off-line, and life support—although not gone—is erratic. Through various circumstances, apparently thrown in by Neelix to add tension to the story, several suspenseful situations arise: Ensign Kim and a female crewman become the only two on several abandoned decks, Tom Paris is brutally injured by an electric discharge from his console, the Doctor goes offline, and Tuvok and Neelix must get to safety by themselves. On their way to Engineering, Tuvok is injured by an electric discharge similar to the one that struck Lt. Paris.

In Engineering, Janeway plays a hunch and talks to what was previously assumed to be a communication malfunction, but is in fact the entity trying to speak. Eventually, Janeway is able to talk to the entity, and realizes that the malfunctioning systems have been its attempt to return to the nebula where it lived.

Relieved, Captain Janeway takes the ship back to the coordinates of the nebula—only to find it has disappeared. Apparently, Voyager's passage through the nebula had destabilized it. The entity, still aboard Voyager, becomes very angry, and begins depleting oxygen from all decks. Repeating frequently "Abandon ship", it intends to make Voyager its new home.

All but the Captain have abandoned ship, and Janeway herself is about to leave, when the door in front of her closes. The entity wants to keep Janeway on the ship, and punish her by depleting her air. She is rescued only after she tells the entity that without her, it too will die, since the ship's systems need to be maintained. Janeway agrees to find a new nebula for the entity to live in.

Neelix's story has concluded, and he tells the children it is time to regenerate. Some of them are scared something might happen: perhaps the entity on deck twelve wants revenge. Neelix then says (supposedly confirming the viewers' beliefs), "What if I told you I made it all up?" Icheb and Mezoti then respond that they knew this all along, and the story was of course impossible, despite their clear fear of the entity earlier.

The episode ends with Neelix, his story done, observing a nebula from the bridge. The Captain informs him that they are taking some final readings before resuming course, and shows him an image of the nebula on the viewscreen. Neelix says "Well, I hope it lives happily ever after."

== Reception ==
Dany Roth writing for SyFy Wire ranked this the 9th best episode written by Bryan Fuller; they thought the science fiction ghost story was a good idea and praised Captain Janeway for being well written in this episode. Den of Geek ranked this 21st among episodes with a Bryan Fuller writing credit, in this case he worked on the teleplay. They felt the episode actually turned out fairly well, saying it nearly achieved being "kitschy and fun".

H&I noted this episode as featuring scary or eerie Star Trek content. TheGamer ranked this one of the top 25 creepiest episodes of all Star Trek series.
