= One Small Step (Star Trek: Voyager) =

- Star Trek: Voyager episode
- Episode no.: Season 6 Episode 8
- Directed by: Robert Picardo
- Story by: Mike Wollaeger; Jessica Scott
- Teleplay by: Mike Wollaeger; Jessica Scott; Bryan Fuller; Michael Taylor
- Production code: 228
- Original air date: November 17, 1999

Guest appearance
- Phil Morris - Lt. John Kelly

Episode chronology
| ← Previous "Dragon's Teeth" | Next → "The Voyager Conspiracy" |
- Star Trek: Voyager season 6

"One Small Step" is the 128th episode of the television series Star Trek: Voyager, the eighth episode of the sixth season. A 24th century spacecraft, the USS Voyager, encounters a 21st century Mars spacecraft in an anomaly.

This episode's teleplay was written by Mike Wollaeger, Jessica Scott, Bryan Fuller, and Michael Taylor, from a story by Wollaeger and Scott. Main cast regular Robert Picardo directs for the second time, and Phil Morris guest stars.

This television episode aired on UPN on November 17, 1999.

== Plot ==
Voyager encounters a graviton ellipse: a massive body of subspace energy that temporarily leaves subspace and travels through normal space for a time. After Seven of Nine provides Voyager with Borg information on how to avoid being harmed by the ellipse, the crew begin scanning it. They recognize it as a similar phenomenon that reportedly consumed the Ares IV, a command module used in Earth's Mars mission in 2032, and its pilot, John Kelly, and that had stranded his two other mission officers on Mars for weeks before they could be rescued. The mysterious disappearance of the Ares IV had almost caused humans to abandon further space missions but ultimately would be the precursor for humankind's future exploration of deep space.

Further scans detect signs of the Ares IV within the ellipse in a stable field that acts as the eye of the storm. Plans are made to modify the Delta Flyer with Seven's information to allow it to enter this field and recover the module. Chakotay and Tom Paris, history buffs for the Mars missions, quickly volunteer. Captain Kathryn Janeway encourages Seven to join them as part of this historic event, even after Seven initially rebuffs the effort as a worthless exploration mission.

The modifications work as expected and the crew soon finds the module, nearly in one piece. Voyager detects the ellipse being drawn towards a dark matter asteroid and warns the Delta Flyer to escape before collision. Chakotay insists on leaving with the module despite Seven's concerns that this will slow the Flyer down. They are unable to clear the ellipse in time and are caught in a shock wave from the collision; Chakotay is injured with plasma burns and the Flyer's shields and engines are knocked off-line. Voyager warns that the Flyer only has a few hours to escape before the ellipse returns to subspace, where they would be trapped indefinitely.

After stabilizing Chakotay, Paris begins effecting repairs but the Flyer's power converter is beyond repair. B'Elanna suggests salvaging the power converter from the Ares IV module to bring the Flyer back online. Chakotay instructs Seven to go, but asking her to not only collect the part but to take time to download data from the module. Seven arrives and powers up the systems. While she works at removing the power converter, John Kelly's logs of the few days he remained alive after being consumed by the ellipse are played out. Seven begins to come to appreciate what Kelly had done, continuing to take readings and collect as much information as he could before his power reserves died, hoping that it would be useful to somebody someday. With little time left to escape, Seven spares enough time to download the module logs and instructs Paris to bring Kelly's preserved body to the Flyer. They are able to install the power converter on the Flyer in time to escape the ellipse with Voyager's help before it returns to subspace.

The crew holds a formal memorial service for Kelly to pay their respects. Among others, Seven provides a brief eulogy, praising the man's exploratory nature that would eventually lead to Voyager and her own existence.

== Reception ==
In 2021, Tor.com reviewed the episode and gave it 9 out of 10, remarking "it’s a damn fine piece of sentiment, with truly great performances by Ryan, Morris, Robert Beltran, and Robert Duncan McNeill." They were also pleased with Robert Picardo directing, noting this was only his second time in that role (he is also the main cast member The Doctor). They were very happy with a moral message they felt included "nobility of scientific inquiry and the pursuit of understanding the greater universe" and also noted the nods to the space exploration program and baseball.

In 2020, The Digital Fix said this felt like a predecessor to episodes of Star Trek: Enterprise but felt there was a lack of connection with the guest star and the backstory about his space journey.

In 2016, John Andrews writing for Den of Geek, said this was the 4th best episode that Bryan Fuller wrote for, noting it is "sentimental about humanity’s early space exploration" and got them excited about space exploration. That same year SyFy placed it the 16th best Bryan Fuller episode, remarking "Basically, Jeri Ryan pulls the episode up from mediocrity".

== Releases ==
This episode was released as part of a season 6 DVD boxset on December 7, 2004.

== See also ==
- Apollo 11 – First crewed Moon landing (1969)
- "One small step", Neil Armstrong quote from Apollo 11
- Ares V – Canceled NASA rocket key to Project Constellation
