= Mosaic (novel) =

1996 novel by Jeri Taylor

- Author: Jeri Taylor
- Language: English
- Subject: Star Trek: Voyager
- Genre: Science fiction
- Published: September 1996
- Publication place: United States
- ISBN: 978-067156-311-0

Mosaic is a novel based on the American science fiction television series Star Trek: Voyager. It was written by Jeri Taylor, who was executive producer of the show for the first five seasons, and was published by Pocket Books in 1996. The novel describes the backstory of Captain Kathryn Janeway, from when she was a small child, to working alongside Owen Paris and finally when she was made captain of her first ship.

Taylor called the offer to write a novel on Janeway's backstory to be one that she could not refuse, and Pocket Books asked her to write a second book before she had completed Mosaic, which became Pathways. These two novels are the only ones to have been considered canon alongside the live-action television episodes and films, and elements of Mosaic were placed by Taylor into the series prior to publishing and continued to be incorporated afterwards.

== Plot ==
The USS Voyager is in a Nebula, avoiding a Kazon warship. Meanwhile, Lt. Tuvok is leading an away team on a planet's surface and Captain Kathryn Janeway must choose between saving her ship or the team and her friend. During this time, she reminisces about her childhood and her career in Starfleet that has led her to this point.

== Production ==
Jeri Taylor was the executive producer of Star Trek: Voyager for the first five seasons, and thereafter acted as a creative consultant until the end of the season. She had co-created the show alongside Michael Piller, and stated that Captain Kathryn Janeway was her most significant character, saying that "There is so much of me in her that in the beginning it bothered me to share her with Kate Mulgrew!" She explained at the start of the series that she considered both herself and Mulgrew to be Janeway, saying "I bring a lot of my sensibilities to the writing of it, she has brought all of her exquisite sensibilities to the playing of it, it's a very collaborative kind of thing."

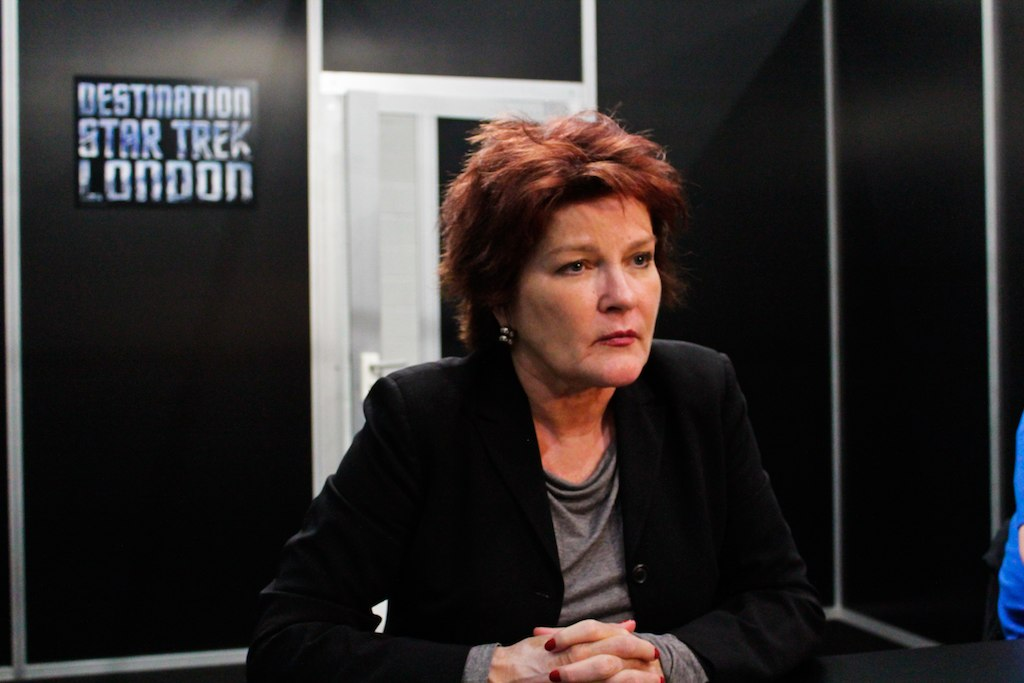
Kate Mulgrew, who played Kathryn Janeway in Voyager, also voiced the audiobook of Mosaic.

Taylor's first novel had been a novelization of the Star Trek: The Next Generation episode "Unification", as she had also written the episode itself. She found that writing the novel had caused her to lose a great deal of sleep, something that would later recur during the process of writing Mosaic. After she had co-created Voyager, she was asked by Pocket Books Star Trek editor John Ordover if she would be interested in writing a book about Janeway's backstory, and this proposal became Mosaic. She described it as "an opportunity to create everything that had gone on in her life from the time she was a little girl to the present, to show what made her the woman she is today. It was an offer I couldn't refuse."

Before she had finished writing the novel, Ordover asked her to write a second Voyager book, which became Pathways. She was concerned at the time that he would not like Mosaic, yet he was asking for a second book already, while he reassured her that he had faith in her work. She also incorporated Kyle Riker, the father of Commander William Riker, into the novel; he had previously appeared in The Next Generation episode "The Icarus Factor". Both Mosaic and Pathways were the only Star Trek novels to be considered canon within the franchise, as of 2000. This means that the events of these novels were considered to be part of the backstory within the television series, unlike the other novelizations within the franchise. Certain events, such as the description of the death of Janeway's father, were written into Voyager. Elements from the book had also been included prior to publishing, as Taylor explained "Last season, I started sneaking little snippets of things that I knew were going to be in the books into episodes, there is going to be a lot of cross-pollination."

Taylor explained that she enjoyed the writing process, "In spite of all the tribulations of writing three books while holding down a full-time job, I found that I loved writing in the prose form. After the limitations and restrictions of a teleplay, it was fun to be able to let my imagination soar and to write without anyone looking over my shoulder, without worrying about fitting a 42-minute format and creating a universe that had to be built on a sound stage! It was truly liberating." The book was published in September 1996, while an audiobook version read by Kate Mulgrew was released the following month.

== Reception ==
Mosaic was one of a number of Star Trek novels recommended for new readers to the series by Dayton Ward on the official Star Trek website in 2013. He said that it was "as close to an official 'autobiography' of Captain Kathryn Janeway as we’re liable ever to get".

== See also ==
- List of Star Trek: Voyager novels
