= Star Trek/Planet of the Apes: The Primate Directive =

Comic book series

- The primary cover of the first issue

Publication information
- Publisher: IDW Publishing
- Format: Limited series
- Genre: Science fiction
- Publication date: December 2014 – April 2015
- No. of issues: 5

Creative team
- Written by: Scott and David Tipton
- Artist: Rachael Stott
- Colorist: Charlie Kirchoff

Star Trek/Planet of the Apes: The Primate Directive is a five-issue crossover comic book series produced in partnership by IDW Comics and Boom! Studios and released between December 2014 and April 2015. The series was written by brothers Scott and David Tipton, with artwork by Rachael Stott, her debut work. The Primate Directive combine elements and characters from the original Star Trek series and the original Planet of the Apes film series. It features Captain James T. Kirk seeking to prevent the Klingons from installing a puppet gorilla government on the planet, which requires them working with various Apes characters such as George Taylor, Cornelius and Zira.

The Tipton brothers were approached by IDW to write the series after their work on the crossover miniseries Star Trek: The Next Generation/Doctor Who: Assimilation². Stott's artwork included the likeness of Charlton Heston, which was allowed after an agreement between IDW and the Heston estate. The first issue, released on December 31, 2014, saw sales of over 53,000, though sales figures would subsequently drop. However, the series has been received positively by critics, who praised Stott's artwork and the nature of how the two franchises interacted.

== Plot ==
Hikaru Sulu and Nyota Uhura discover the Klingons have been seeking to expand into another universe using a gateway built of advanced technology in order to get around an Organian enforced peace treaty. The USS Enterprise approaches and engages two Klingon vessels, before pursuing one of them through a portal to the other universe. They arrive in orbit of Earth, albeit one whose history has diverged. Captain James T. Kirk leads an away team to the surface where they see the Klingon Kor providing the gorillas with rifles. They are detected and flee. Kor promises to deal with the interlopers, while the Starfleet team return to the ship. They discuss the situation and decide to stop the Klingons. Returning to the surface near the Statue of Liberty, they follow human tracks around to a cove.

They find George Taylor, who asks them to help overthrow the apes. Kirk says they cannot, but agrees to meet with Cornelius and Zira and has the group transported to their location. Once they arrive, Kirk instructs the Enterprise to use the phasers set to stun on a large group of gorillas. The two chimpanzees explain ape society to the Starfleet crew before Taylor argues that the apes should be overthrown again. Kirk turns him down, but enlists the help of the chimpanzees. Taylor abducts Pavel Chekov, steals his communicator and has himself beamed to the Enterprise. Kirk, Spock and Chekov follow him to the ship where they find him trying to steal a shuttlecraft. He and Kirk get into a fist fight, before Taylor agrees to follow Kirk's lead back to the surface to work with the apes. Kor gives Marius a disruptor and a uniform, ordering him to deliver the ape society to the Klingon Empire. The Enterprise crew detect the gorilla army movement and beam Zira into Ape City to warn Dr. Zaius and the gorilla General Ursus.

Klingon-backed gorillas attack Kirk's team, who have taken position in the Klingons' store room but the attackers are defeated. However, they discover that in the fracas, a sniper rifle was taken. Taylor, Kirk and the Starfleet crew ride out to stop the Klingons, and prevent Kor from assassinating Ursus who has gone to talk down Marius. They defeat Kor and his colleagues, but the Klingons beam back up to their ship. Ursus and Marius fight, with Ursus victorious. Kirk and his team leave to pursue Kor, leaving the rifles in the hands of the gorillas who are no longer puppets of the Klingons. The Enterprise chases Kor's ship for three days, and find themselves back at the alternative Earth as the atmosphere is destroyed by a cobalt bomb which eradicates all life on the planet. The Enterprise pursues Kor back through the portal to their own universe. Meanwhile, Cornelius, Zira and Milo are in orbit on-board a primitive space vessel having witnessed the destruction below. Not knowing what to do, they consult a tricorder left behind by Kirk's team which instructs them on how to travel through time using a slingshot effect.

== Publication ==
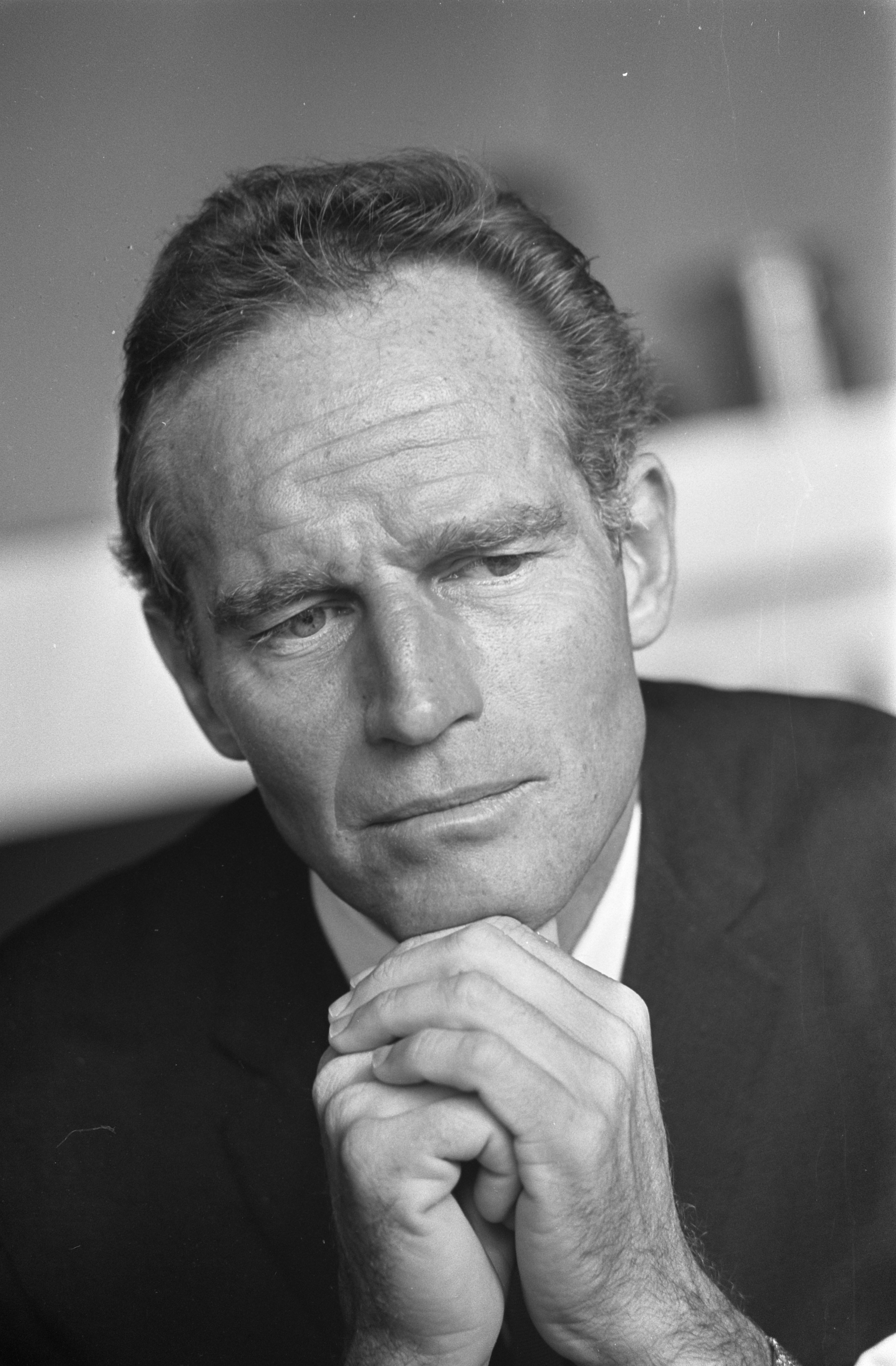
The Primate Directive was able to use Charlton Heston's likeness after an agreement between his estate and IDW Publishing.

Published by IDW Publishing, The Primate Directive marked the first occasion that Boom! Studios had teamed up with another comic publisher. IDW holds the license for Star Trek, while BOOM! holds the Planet of the Apes license. Both series have their origins in the 1960s, and the 1970s Planet of the Apes series was chosen by CBS over Star Trek creator Gene Roddenberry's Genesis II. The Primate Directive was announced shortly after the theatrical release of the 2014 film Dawn of the Planet of the Apes at San Diego Comic-Con.

The comic series was written by Scott and David Tipton, with the art by Rachael Stott and colors by Charlie Kirchoff. The Tipton brothers had previously worked on the Doctor Who/Star Trek comic crossover, Star Trek: The Next Generation/Doctor Who: Assimilation², and were approached by IDW to write the crossover series. They were initially concerned with how the two universes could "come together in a meaningful way", but once they had worked out how they could merge then the story ideas came naturally.

Stott described drawing the two franchises crossing over as a "coma dream", and in particular enjoyed drawing the Apes characters. After IDW editor-in-chief Chris Ryall saw some of her work at a comics convention in London, England. She was put in touch with editor Sarah Gaydos, and after the duo exchanged emails about Star Trek and Planet of the Apes for a while, she was hired to work on The Primate Directive as her first published work. One of the features of the artwork in the series was the ability to draw George Taylor as he appeared in the 1968 film, played by Charlton Heston. In the Marvel Comics adaptation of the film, Heston's likeness rights were not purchased, but IDW reached an agreement with the Heston estate for The Primate Directive.

== Release and reception ==
The first issue was released on December 31, 2014. A variety of alternative covers were produced, including one by Juan Ortiz, a second cover by Stott exclusive to NerdBlock, separate retailer incentive versions by George Pérez and Tone Rodriguez, and a second cover by Pérez for subscribers. It sold 17,307 issues on that first day of release, placing it in 144th highest sales for the month. During January 2015, it sold a further 35,733 issues, placing it in 46th place overall. Meanwhile the second issue sold 13,460 copies. In March, the third and fourth issues sold 11,960 and 11,410 respectively. The following month saw 11,487 copies of the fifth and final issue sold. The issues were subsequently released as a trade paperback.

Review aggregator website ComicBookRoundUp gave the series an average rating of 7.7 out of 10, based on 25 reviews by critics of individual issues. Reviewing the first issue for Comic Vine, Corey Schroeder said that the two series suited each other for a crossover and that it was executed well. Stott's artwork was praised, specifically for the weight given to characters and how she evoked the "exaggerated, often melodramatic, look and feel of both these properties". However, he criticised the ending of that issue, and described the cliffhanger as obvious.

Joel Harley reviewed the first issue for Starburst magazine, giving it a rating of 7 out of 10, saying that the combination of the two properties felt natural and that the plot read like a missing episode of The Original Series. He described it as a "storming read" with "some great artwork, writing and action to be had". Victoria McNally listed The Primate Directive as the sixth best Star Trek comics crossover in 2015 for MTV News, saying that "the whole crossover is worth it just for that amazing title".

== See also ==
- Star Trek crossovers

== Bibliography ==
- Van Hise, James (1992). The Man Who Created Star Trek: Gene Roddenberry. Pioneer Books. ISBN 1-55698-318-2.
