= Genesis (Star Trek: The Next Generation) =

- Star Trek: The Next Generation episode
- Episode no.: Season 7 Episode 19
- Directed by: Gates McFadden
- Written by: Brannon Braga
- Production code: 271
- Original air date: March 19, 1994

Guest appearances
- Dwight Schultz - Lt. Reginald Barclay; Patti Yasutake - Nurse Alyssa Ogawa; Carlos Ferro - Ensign Dern; Majel Barrett - Enterprise Computer

Episode chronology
← Previous "Eye of the Beholder"	Next → "Journey's End"
- Star Trek: The Next Generation season 7

"Genesis" is the 171st episode of the American science fiction television series Star Trek: The Next Generation and the 19th episode of the seventh season. It was directed by series cast member Gates McFadden, her only directing credit to date.

Set in the 24th century, the series follows the adventures of the Starfleet crew of the Federation starship Enterprise-D. In this episode, Captain Jean-Luc Picard and Data return to the USS Enterprise to discover the rest of the crew de-evolved into primitive forms of life, including spiders, amphibians and cave men.

This episode was broadcast on March 21, 1994.

== Plot ==
Picard and Data leave the Enterprise in a shuttlecraft to retrieve a photon torpedo that has veered off course during a weapons exercise. Before departing, Data leaves his pregnant cat, Spot, with Lieutenant Barclay. Convinced that he is suffering from a devastating illness, the hypochondriac Barclay visits Dr. Crusher, who diagnoses a mild case of the flu and injects him with a synthetic T-cell to activate one of his dormant genes that confers immunity. Shortly afterward, crew members begin to experience strange symptoms; Counselor Troi feels cold and develops an uncontrollable thirst, while Riker has trouble concentrating and Barclay becomes fidgety and overly energetic. Worf feels hot and becomes aggressive, trying to stay near Troi and eventually biting her on the cheek. Both are taken to sickbay for treatment; when Crusher examines Worf and finds a venom sac growing on his neck, he spits acidic poison in her face. A severely injured Crusher is placed in stasis, while Worf escapes. Nurse Ogawa warns the senior staff that everyone on the ship is in danger.

Picard and Data return after three days, having retrieved the wayward torpedo, but find the ship adrift with its main power offline. They hear eerie animal-like sounds throughout the ship and find a bridge crew member dead, having suffered a savage attack. Most of the crew are de-evolving; Troi has reverted into an amphibian, Riker an Australopithecine (Caveman), and Barclay a spider. Data discovers that a synthetic T-cell has invaded the crew members' genetic code and activated their introns at random, causing them to devolve. Picard is soon overcome by irrational emotions of fear and anxiety, indicating that he has been infected, and Data suggests he might soon become a primate similar to a lemur or marmoset. Picard and Data return to Data's quarters and find Spot and her kittens. Spot herself has changed into an iguana; however, the kittens are normal. Data recommends that they locate Ogawa, who is also pregnant, on the theory that antibodies in amniotic fluid can prevent the infection from spreading.

The two find Ogawa already devolved into a cavewoman, and bring her, Riker and Troi to sickbay so Data can begin working on a cure. They are interrupted by something attempting to break through the door, and realise that Worf has reverted into an aggressive predator attempting to mate with Troi. As Worf batters the doors in search of Troi, Data formulates a pheromone spray from her gland secretions. Picard slips out and uses the spray to lure Worf away for Data's safety. Worf corners Picard in a Jefferies tube, but Picard rips out a power cable and uses it to shock Worf into unconsciousness. Data formulates an effective retrovirus and releases it into the ship's ventilation system, causing everyone to return to normal.

Crusher discovers that due to an anomaly in Barclay's genes, the T-cells in the injection she gave him mutated, activating all of his dormant genes and becoming transmissible from one person to another. She decides to name the condition "Barclay's protomorphosis syndrome" after its first confirmed patient.

== Awards ==
"Genesis" won an Emmy award for Outstanding Individual Achievement in Sound Mixing for a Drama Series.

== Reception ==
"Genesis" employs heavy make-up use, and 1994 saw 10 Emmy nominations for The Next Generation for Outstanding Individual Achievement in Makeup for a Series. This includes one for Michael Westmore, who served as the make-up supervisor for Genesis.

In 2017, Io9 noted "Genesis" for being one of the more bizarre science-fiction stories of the franchise, noting how different characters devolved into frightening creatures, such as Worf turning into a giant super-Klingon that hunted other crew members.

In 2018, TheGamer ranked this one of the top 25 creepiest episodes of all Star Trek series.

In 2020, GameSpot noted this episode for having some of the most bizarre moments of series, such as spider-Barclay, Worf's venom spray, and ape-Riker.

In 2020, the senior curator at the Museum of Pop Culture listed this among four Star Trek franchise episodes they suggested watching during the Pandemic.

In 2020, ScreenRant said this was "fun to watch" but also one of the scariest Star Trek:The Next Generation episodes. In 2021, they said this was one of the "Classic" and "Memorable" episodes of the television series, and also the only directing credit for Gates McFadden.

== Video releases ==
This was released in Japan on LaserDisc on October 9, 1998, as part of the half-season collection Log.14: Seventh Season Part.2. This set included episodes from "Lower Decks" to Part II of "All Good Things", with English and Japanese audio tracks.
