= Pathfinder (Star Trek: Voyager) =

- Star Trek: Voyager episode
- Episode no.: Season 6 Episode 10
- Directed by: Mike Vejar
- Story by: David Zabel
- Teleplay by: David Zabel; Kenneth Biller
- Production code: 230
- Original air date: December 1, 1999

Guest appearances
- Dwight Schultz - Reginald Barclay; Marina Sirtis - Deanna Troi; Richard McGonagle - Pete Harkins; Richard Herd - Adm. Owen Paris

Episode chronology
← Previous "The Voyager Conspiracy"	Next → "Fair Haven"
- Star Trek: Voyager season 6

"Pathfinder" is the tenth episode of the sixth season of the science fiction television series Star Trek: Voyager, 130th episode overall. It features the characters Reginald Barclay and Deanna Troi from Star Trek: The Next Generation. This also marks the first contact with Earth by Voyager since Message in a Bottle (S4E14).

This episode was written by David Zabel and Kenneth Biller and directed by Mike Vejar.

This episode debuted on UPN on December 2, 1999.

== Plot ==
On Earth, Reginald Barclay is involved in the Pathfinder project, an effort to communicate with the USS Voyager, which is stranded in the Delta Quadrant. Barclay soon becomes obsessed. He loses himself in the reality of the holographic Voyager created for the project, enjoying the false friendships within.

He seeks help from old friend and shipmate Counselor Deanna Troi, who advises him to forge real relationships and stop straying into the holo-program he has created of the Voyager ship and crew. When Admiral Paris visits the project to inspect progress, Barclay ignores orders from Commander Harkins, the project leader, not to bother the Admiral with his infeasible suggestions. Barclay puts forward his theory that using the MIDAS Array (an advanced sensor array), and computing Voyager's progress from their last contact, they would be able to create a micro wormhole in the Delta Quadrant near Voyager and use it to create a two way communication link. Admiral Paris is intrigued by this and promises to give it further study which Barclay is highly excited by, but at a later meeting with Admiral Paris, Barclay oversteps the line and is removed from the project for insubordination.

Later that night, he breaks back into the Pathfinder project to prove his theory is correct. He hacks into the system and sends commands to the array which, as he predicted, creates the wormhole in the Delta Quadrant. As he attempts to contact Voyager using the array, Starfleet detects and sends security personnel to stop him. Barclay locks out the system and takes refuge in the holodeck simulation of Voyager where he continues to direct the wormhole to locate Voyager. The security officers led by Commander Harkins follow Barclay into the simulation where the faux Voyager crew rebels, even firing on the security officers. Of course, this has no effect except to momentarily distract them as the safety protocols are on. The holo-Torres is destroyed by a pursuing Commander Harkins, who shuts down the primary cooling systems on the holographic Voyager which will cause the warp core to overheat and breach, effectively destroying the entire program unless Barclay complies and releases command back to him.

As a dejected Barclay is led out, Admiral Paris enters the lab and announces that Barclay's idea has real promise and should be explored further. As he is informed that the attempt has already been made and was unsuccessful, Admiral Paris expresses regret at Barclay's choice to disregard protocol.

Meanwhile, the real Voyager, far in the Delta Quadrant, detects the micro-wormhole and a communication signal which Seven of Nine disbelievingly identifies as Federation in origin on a Starfleet Emergency Channel. The crew attempts to clear up the signal, while back on Earth the jubilant officers and Barclay assist. For a few seconds the team on Earth clear up the return signal, two-way communication is established for 86 seconds before the micro-wormhole collapses. A few words are exchanged and data from Voyager's logs, crew reports, and navigational records are transmitted to Earth. Barclay sends "data on some new hyper-subspace technology", along with recommended modifications to the ship's communications system, so that Voyager's crew will be able to keep regular contact with home. In the final seconds, the crew hear some moving words from Admiral Paris ending with, "I want you all to know we're doing everything we can to bring you home."

To celebrate the knowledge that home is looking for them and regular communication will be possible in due time, the crew of Voyager hold a party in honor of Barclay. They discuss what little they know of him through his personnel record and declare him an honorary Voyager crewmember.

== Reception ==
Keith R. A. DeCandido of Tor.com rated the episode 9 out of 10.

In 2020, io9 listed this episode as one of the "must watch" episodes from season six of the show.

The Digital Fix said Barclay and Troi offered an enjoyable callback to Star Trek: The Next Generation in this episode and also "Life Line".

== Releases ==
This episode was released as part of a season 6 DVD box set on December 7, 2004.

== See also ==
- Hollow Pursuits (The character Reginald Barclay debuts on Star Trek: The Next Generation)
