= List of Star Trek: Voyager novels =

List of Star Trek: Voyager novels based on the American science fiction television series of the same name. The book line is published by Simon & Schuster's imprints Pocket Books, Pocket Star, Gallery, and Atria.

Key:
All novels published as paperback editions, except where indicated.
†	Hardcover first edition.
^	Children's or young adult book.
‡	Included in omnibus or collection.
#	Published as a numbered novel.
Navy	Miniseries name.
Pink	Crossover series name.
ed.	Omnibus or collection editor(s).
et al.	Multiple authors, see note.

== Episode novelizations ==
Based on select episodes from the television series:

Title	Author(s)	Date	ISBN
Caretaker #	L. A. Graf	February 1995	0-671-51914-X
Flashback	Diane Carey	October 1996	0-671-00383-6
Day of Honor ‡	Michael Jan Friedman	November 1997	0-671-01981-3
Equinox	Diane Carey	October 1999	0-671-04295-5
Endgame (Note: Similarly named novels: End Game (1997), a New Frontier novel by Peter David; Endgame (2001), a Voyager episode novelization by Diane Carey.)	Diane Carey	June 26, 2001	0-7434-4216-4

== Numbered novels ==
Numbered paperback releases:

No.	Title	Author(s)	Date	ISBN
1	Caretaker (novelization)	L. A. Graf	February 1995	0-671-51914-X
2	The Escape	Dean Wesley Smith and Kristine Kathryn Rusch	May 1995	0-671-52096-2
3	Ragnarok	Nathan Archer	July 1995	0-671-52044-X
4	Violations	Susan Wright	September 1995	0-671-52046-6
5	Incident at Arbuk	John Gregory Betancourt	November 1995	0-671-52048-2
6	The Murdered Sun	Christie Golden	February 1996	0-671-53783-0
7	Ghost of a Chance	Mark A. Garland and Charles G. McGraw	April 1996	0-671-56798-5
8	Cybersong	S. N. Lewitt	May 1996	0-671-56783-7
9	The Final Fury ‡ (Invasion!, Book 4)	Dafydd ab Hugh	August 1996	0-671-54181-1
10	Bless the Beasts	Karen Haber	November 1996	0-671-56780-2
11	The Garden	Melissa Scott	February 1997	0-671-56799-3
12	Chrysalis	David Niall Wilson	March 1997	0-671-00150-7
13	The Black Shore	Greg Cox	May 1997	0-671-56061-1
14	Marooned	Christie Golden	December 1997	0-671-01423-4
15	Echoes	Dean Wesley Smith, Kristine Kathryn Rusch, and Nina Kiriki Hoffman	January 1998	0-671-00200-7
16	Seven of Nine	Christie Golden	September 1998	0-671-02491-4
17	Death of a Neutron Star	Eric Kotani and Dean Wesley Smith	March 1999	0-671-00425-5
18	Battle Lines	Dave Galanter and Greg Brodeur	May 1999	0-671-00259-7
19	Cloak and Dagger (Dark Matters, Book 1)	Christie Golden	November 2000	0-671-03582-7
20	Ghost Dance (Dark Matters, Book 2)	Christie Golden	November 2000	0-671-03583-5
21	Shadow of Heaven (Dark Matters, Book 3)	Christie Golden	December 2000	0-671-03584-3

== Original novels ==
Includes hardcover and paperback releases:

Title	Author(s)	Date	ISBN
Mosaic †	Jeri Taylor	October 1996	0-671-56311-4
Her Klingon Soul ‡ (Day of Honor, Book 3)	Michael Jan Friedman	October 1997	0-671-00240-6
Fire Ship ‡ (The Captain's Table, Book 4)	Diane Carey (Note: Fire Ship (1998), as by Kathryn Janeway, told in her own words, as recorded by Diane Carey.)	July 1998	0-671-01467-6
Pathways †	Jeri Taylor	August 1998	0-671-00346-1
Shadow (Section 31, Book 2)	Dean Wesley Smith and Kristine Kathryn Rusch	May 22, 2001	0-671-77478-6
No Man's Land (Gateways, Book 5)	Christie Golden	October 2, 2001	0-7434-1857-3
The Nanotech War	Steven Piziks	October 29, 2002	0-7434-3646-6

== Young adult novels ==
Star Trek: Voyager – Starfleet Academy young adult miniseries explores the lives of the Voyager crew as Starfleet Academy cadets.

No.	Title ^	Author(s)	Date	ISBN
1	Lifeline	Bobbi J.G. Weiss and David Cody Weiss	August 1997	0-671-00845-5
2	The Chance Factor	Diana G. Gallagher and Martin R. Burke	September 1997	0-671-00732-7
3	Quarantine (Note: Similarly named novels: Quarantine (1999), a The Next Generation novel by John Vornholt; Quarantine (1997), a Voyager young adult novel by Patricia Barnes-Svarney.)	Patricia Barnes-Svarney	October 1997	0-671-00733-5

== Omnibus editions ==
Collections of novels from the Voyager book line.

Title	Author(s)	Date	ISBN
Invasion!	John J. Ordover, ed. (Note: Invasion! (1998) by John J. Ordover, editor, with Diane Carey, Dean Wesley Smith, Kristine Kathryn Rusch, L.A. Graf, and Dafydd ab Hugh.)	June 1998	0-671-02185-0
Day of Honor	Diane Carey, et al. (Note: Day of Honor (1999) by Diane Carey, L.A. Graf, Michael Jan Friedman, Dean Wesley Smith and Kristine Kathryn Rusch, and Diane G. Gallagher.)	March 1999	0-671-02813-8
The Captain's Table	L. A. Graf, et al. (Note: The Captain's Table (2000) by L.A. Graf, Michael Jan Friedman, Dean Wesley Smith and Kristine Kathryn Rusch, Diane Carey, Peter David, Jerry Oltion.)	March 2000	0-671-04052-9

== Short story collections ==
Collections featuring characters and settings from Voyager.

Title	Editor(s)	Date	ISBN
Adventures in Time and Space (excerpt collection)	Mary P. Taylor	August 1999	0-671-03415-4
Captain Proton: Defender of Earth	Dean Wesley Smith (Note: As by D.W. "Prof" Smith, Ray Hamil, Lester Lee, and Don Simster.)	November 1999	0-671-03646-7
What Lay Beyond † (Gateways, Book 7)	John J. Ordover (Note: What Lay Beyond (2001) by John J. Ordover, editor, with Diane Carey, Peter David, Keith DeCandido, Christie Golden, Robert Greenberger, and Susan Wright.)	October 30, 2001	0-7434-3112-X
The Amazing Stories	John J. Ordover	August 20, 2002	0-7434-4915-0
Tales of the Dominion War	Keith DeCandido	August 3, 2004	0-7434-9171-8
Tales from the Captain's Table	Keith DeCandido	June 14, 2005	1-4165-0520-2
Distant Shores	Marco Palmieri	November 1, 2005	0-7434-9253-6
Seven Deadly Sins	Margaret Clark	March 16, 2010	978-1-4391-0944-1

== Miniseries ==
=== Dark Matters (2000) ===
Star Trek: Voyager – Dark Matters miniseries explores events after the episode "Eye of the Needle". Published as part of the numbered novel series, books 19 to 21.

No.	Title #	Author	Date	ISBN
1	Cloak and Dagger	Christie Golden	November 2000	0-671-03582-7
2	Ghost Dance	Christie Golden	November 2000	0-671-03583-5
3	Shadow of Heaven	Christie Golden	December 2000	0-671-03584-3

=== Spirit Walk (2004) ===
Star Trek: Voyager – Spirit Walk miniseries follows Chakotay's first mission as captain of Voyager. Old Wounds (2004) is a direct sequel to The Farther Shore (2003). Enemy of My Enemy ties into the Star Trek: Destiny miniseries by David Mack.

No.	Title	Author	Date	ISBN
1	Old Wounds	Christie Golden	October 26, 2004	0-7434-9258-7
2	Enemy of My Enemy	Christie Golden	November 30, 2004	0-7434-9257-9

=== String Theory (2005) ===
Star Trek: Voyager – String Theory was published on the tenth-anniversary of the television series premiere. Cohesion (2005) opens with a violent encounter with the Nacene, a non-humanoid species featured in episodes "Caretaker" and "Cold Fire". The novels included conclusions to unresolved plots, and explanations for visual and narrative inconsistencies from the television series.

No.	Title	Author(s)	Date	ISBN
1	Cohesion	Jeffrey Lang	June 28, 2005	0-7434-5718-8
2	Fusion	Kirsten Beyer	November 1, 2005	1-4165-0955-0
3	Evolution	Heather Jarman	February 28, 2006	1-4165-0781-7

== Relaunch novels ==
Interlinked novels set after the episode "Endgame". Homecoming (2003) and The Farther Shore (2003), by Christie Golden, detail the aftermath of Voyager's surprise return to Earth. From 2004 to 2009, Voyager characters appeared in other Star Trek relaunch novels. The series was reset with the publication of Kirsten Beyer's Full Circle (2009), aligning Christie Golden's Homecoming (2003) The Farther Shore (2003), and Spirit Walk (2004) with changes introduced in String Theory (2005–06) and connecting Voyager to the shared continuity of other Star Trek relaunch book lines.

Full Circle (2009) ties into Star Trek: Destiny and its sequel series Typhon Pact.

Title	Author(s)	Date	ISBN
Homecoming	Christie Golden	June 3, 2003	0-7434-6754-X
The Farther Shore	Christie Golden	July 1, 2003	0-7434-6755-8
Old Wounds (Spirit Walk, Book 1)	Christie Golden	October 26, 2004	0-7434-9258-7
Enemy of My Enemy (Spirit Walk, Book 2)	Christie Golden	November 30, 2004	0-7434-9257-9
Full Circle	Kirsten Beyer	March 31, 2009	978-1-4165-9496-3
Unworthy	Kirsten Beyer	September 29, 2009	978-1-4391-0398-2
Children of the Storm	Kirsten Beyer	May 31, 2011	978-1-4516-0718-5
The Eternal Tide	Kirsten Beyer	August 28, 2012	978-1-4516-6818-6
Protectors	Kirsten Beyer	January 28, 2014	978-1-4767-3854-3
Acts of Contrition	Kirsten Beyer	September 30, 2014	978-1-4767-6551-8
Atonement	Kirsten Beyer	August 25, 2015	978-1-4767-9081-7
A Pocket Full of Lies	Kirsten Beyer	January 26, 2016	978-1-4767-9084-8
Architects of Infinity	Kirsten Beyer	March 27, 2018	978-1-5011-3876-8
To Lose the Earth	Kirsten Beyer	October 13, 2020	978-1-5011-3883-6

== See also ==
- List of Star Trek novels
