= Planet X (novel) =

1998 novel by Michael Jan Friedman

Star Trek: The Next Generation/X-Men: Planet X
- Author: Michael Jan Friedman
- Language: English
- Genre: Science fiction; Superhero; Space opera
- Publisher: Pocket Books
- Publication date: May 1998
- Publication place: United States
- Pages: 265
- ISBN: 0-671-01916-3
- OCLC: 39043569
- LC Class: CPB Box no. 1920 vol. 8

Planet X (ISBN 0671019163) is a 1998 Star Trek novel by Michael Jan Friedman that is a crossover between the X-Men comic book series and the characters of Star Trek: The Next Generation. A New York Times bestseller, it was a sequel to an earlier crossover, detailed in the Marvel Comics one-shot Star Trek: The Next Generation/X-Men. The story was itself similar to an earlier Star Trek/X-Men crossover comic, where a slightly different team of X-Men encountered the characters of the original Star Trek series. The novel hinted at an attraction between Jean-Luc Picard and Ororo Munroe (Storm) and made a forward-looking reference to the (then-uncast) X-Men feature film by remarking on the uncanny resemblance between Picard and Xavier, as the two converse via the holodeck after a reasonable facsimile of Xavier is programmed into it. Both characters were played by Patrick Stewart in Star Trek: The Next Generation and the X-Men film series. The author stated that "The book sold very, very well".

== Reception ==
SF Site gave a negative review, stating that "[...] it just never gels. Both the X-Men and Trek characters are so locked in stereotype and corporate rigidity that little can be done with them anymore." /Film said: "It's wankery of the highest order, and one might feel a little sillier for having read it." Gizmodo called it "a delicious little novel" and an "overlooked gem".

== See also ==
- Star Trek crossovers
