= Teaching Exceptional Children =

- Discipline: Special education
- Language: English
- Edited by: Dawn A. Rowe

Publication details
- History: 1968-present
- Publisher: SAGE Publications on behalf of the Council for Exceptional Children (United States)
- Frequency: Bimonthly

Standard abbreviations
- ISO 4: Teach. Except. Child.

Indexing
- ISSN: 0040-0599 (print); 2163-5684 (web)
- LCCN: 78007226
- OCLC no.: 630938875

Links
- Journal homepage; Online access; Online archive; Journal page at council's website

Teaching Exceptional Children (styled TEACHING Exceptional Children) is a bimonthly peer-reviewed academic journal covering the field of special education. The editor-in-chief is Dawn A Rowe (East Tennessee State University). It was established in 1968 and is published by SAGE Publications on behalf of the Council for Exceptional Children.

== Abstracting and indexing ==
TEACHING Exceptional Children is abstracted and indexed in:

- ERIC
- NISC

== See also ==
- Exceptional Children
