= Hollow Pursuits =

- Star Trek: The Next Generation episode
- Episode no.: Season 3 Episode 21
- Directed by: Cliff Bole
- Written by: Sally Caves
- Production code: 169
- Original air date: April 30, 1990

Guest appearances
- Dwight Schultz as Reginald Barclay; Charley Lang as Duffy; Colm Meaney as Miles O'Brien; Whoopi Goldberg as Guinan; Majel Barrett as Computer Voice

Episode chronology
← Previous "Tin Man"	Next → "The Most Toys"
- Star Trek: The Next Generation season 3

"Hollow Pursuits" is the 21st episode of the third season of the American science fiction television series Star Trek: The Next Generation, and the 69th episode of the series overall. The episode introduces the character Lieutenant Reginald Barclay, who would go on to appear occasionally in The Next Generation and Star Trek: Voyager, as well as in the film Star Trek: First Contact.

Set in the 24th century, the series follows the adventures of the Starfleet crew of the Federation starship Enterprise-D. This episode features the use of the holodeck, a fictional technology that can create immersive simulated experiences. In the episode, the highly insecure Lt. Barclay uses the holodeck to cope with his anxiety, while the senior officers debate how to deal with his subpar job performance.

== Plot ==
The Enterprise is transporting biological samples intended for use in combating an epidemic. When they find one of the sample containers is leaking, they are forced to destroy it to prevent the contamination of the other samples. Chief Engineer La Forge reports that one of his engineers, Barclay (cruelly nicknamed "Broccoli" by Wesley Crusher), has been underperforming. Unknown to La Forge, Barclay has been using the holodeck to simulate Enterprise crew members and behave aggressively toward them, which he is too meek to do in real life. Captain Picard recommends that La Forge take Barclay on as a "pet project" and bans the "Broccoli" nickname.

As the engineering team investigates the failure of unconnected systems around the ship, La Forge tries to support Barclay, who remains embarrassed and anxious. When Picard slips up and accidentally calls him "Broccoli", Barclay returns to the holodeck. La Forge finds him there, discovers his exaggerated simulations of the crew, and recommends he meet with Counselor Troi, not knowing his holodeck simulations have also involved sexual fantasies about her. Barclay attempts to undergo a real counseling session with Troi, but is overwhelmed with embarrassment as he mistakenly believes her to be making a sexual advance before fleeing back to the holodeck.

When Barclay cannot be located, First Officer Riker storms into the holodeck with La Forge and Troi to locate him. They find comical versions of the senior staff, including an extremely short, bumbling version of Riker and a fantasy of Troi as the "goddess of empathy". Suddenly, the Enterprise's warp drive begins accelerating uncontrollably. La Forge takes Barclay to Engineering to discover the matter/antimatter injectors have jammed; the ship will continue to accelerate until it collapses unless they are cleared.

Barclay realizes all the equipment failures have been connected by a human element: a member of the Engineering team has been present at each incident, so he surmises that somehow they became carriers of an undetectable contaminant. They quickly narrow down the possibilities and determine that the contamination was a substance derived from the leaking biological sample container. They are able to repair the injectors, stop the ship, and set course for a nearby starbase to remove the rest of the contamination. La Forge commends Barclay for his contribution in saving the ship.

Barclay returns one more time to the holodeck and says farewell to the simulated bridge crew, and then deletes all of his holodeck programs but one.

== Production ==
According to episode writer Sally Caves, Reginald Barclay (Dwight Schultz) is a satirical depiction of Trekkies and their excessive obsession with imaginary characters. Director Cliff Bole disagreed, saying: "I didn't feel that, and I would have heard if it was intended. I certainly didn't approach it that way."

== Reception ==
In 2009, Io9 listed "Hollow Pursuits" as one of the worst of the holodeck themed episodes, although they noted that some people like it. They note that it features Lt. Barclay, who has become addicted to the holodeck and main bridge crew must wean him off his fantasy life.

In 2016, Syfy ranked this the 10th best holodeck episode of the Star Trek franchise.

In 2019, CBR ranked this the fourth best holodeck-themed episode of all Star Trek franchise episodes up to that time.

== Releases ==
The episode was released with Star Trek: The Next Generation season three DVD box set, released in the United States on July 2, 2002. This had 26 episodes of Season 3 on seven discs, with a Dolby Digital 5.1 audio track. It was released in high-definition Blu-ray in the United States on April 30, 2013.
