= Exceptional Children =

- Discipline: Special education
- Language: English
- Edited by: Katheleen King Thorius, Endia J. Lindo, Patricia Martínez-Álvarez, Amanda L. Sullivan

Publication details
- History: 1934-present
- Publisher: SAGE Publications on behalf of the Council for Exceptional Children
- Frequency: Quarterly
- Impact factor: 3.34 (2017)

Standard abbreviations
- ISO 4: Except. Child.

Indexing
- ISSN: 0014-4029 (print); 2163-5560 (web)
- LCCN: sv87073010
- OCLC no.: 1568566

Links
- Journal homepage; Online access; Online archive; Journal page at council's website

Exceptional Children is a quarterly peer-reviewed academic journal covering the field of special education. The editors-in-chief are Kathleen King Thorius (Indiana University), Endia J. Lindo (Texas Christian University), Patricia Martínez-Álvarez (Teachers College, Columbia University), Amanda L. Sullivan (University of Minnesota). It was established in 1934, took on its present title in 1951, and is published by SAGE Publications on behalf of the Council for Exceptional Children.

== Abstracting and indexing ==
The journal is abstracted and indexed in:

- ERIC
- Scopus
- ProQuest
- Social Sciences Citation Index
- Current Contents/Social & Behavioral Sciences

According to the Journal Citation Reports, the journal has a 2017 impact factor of 3.34, ranking it 1st out of 40 journals in the category "Special Education" and 2nd out of 69 journals in the category "Rehabilitation".

== See also ==
- Teaching Exceptional Children
