= Life Line (Star Trek: Voyager) =

- Star Trek: Voyager episode
- Episode no.: Season 6 Episode 24
- Directed by: Terry Windell
- Story by: John Bruno; Robert Picardo
- Teleplay by: Robert Doherty; Raf Green; Brannon Braga
- Production code: 243
- Original air date: May 10, 2000

Guest appearances
- Dwight Schultz - Reginald Barclay; Marina Sirtis - Deanna Troi; Tamara Craig Thomas - Haley; Jack Shearer - Admiral Hayes

Episode chronology
← Previous "Fury"	Next → "The Haunting of Deck Twelve"
- Star Trek: Voyager season 6

"Life Line" is the 24th episode from the sixth season of Star Trek: Voyager, the 144th episode overall. It is one of the episodes in the Star Trek universe in which characters from elsewhere in the franchise are extended by Voyager. Reginald Barclay and Deanna Troi from Star Trek: The Next Generation make appearances, and in addition Jean-Luc Picard is twice mentioned by Troi but not seen. This is also one of the few episodes where a character actually arrives in the Alpha Quadrant, and the only Voyager episode which has a cast member receiving a writing credit.

Barclay and Troi previously worked together earlier in the season in "Pathfinder" (S6E10) and this episode continues that narrative thread and further develops their characters. In addition this brings together elements established by "Projections" (S2E3) and connects them with Pathfinder. The relationship between Zimmerman and Barclay is depicted and Jupiter Station is actually shown at Jupiter in special effects shots during this episode.

Robert Picardo plays both Voyager's customized Mark I EMH and his "father" Doctor Zimmerman, and another special effect display is shown in numerous scenes together during the episode. Doctor Lewis Zimmerman was previously in "The Swarm" (S3E4) and Deep Space Nine's "Doctor Bashir, I Presume"(S5E16).

== Plot ==
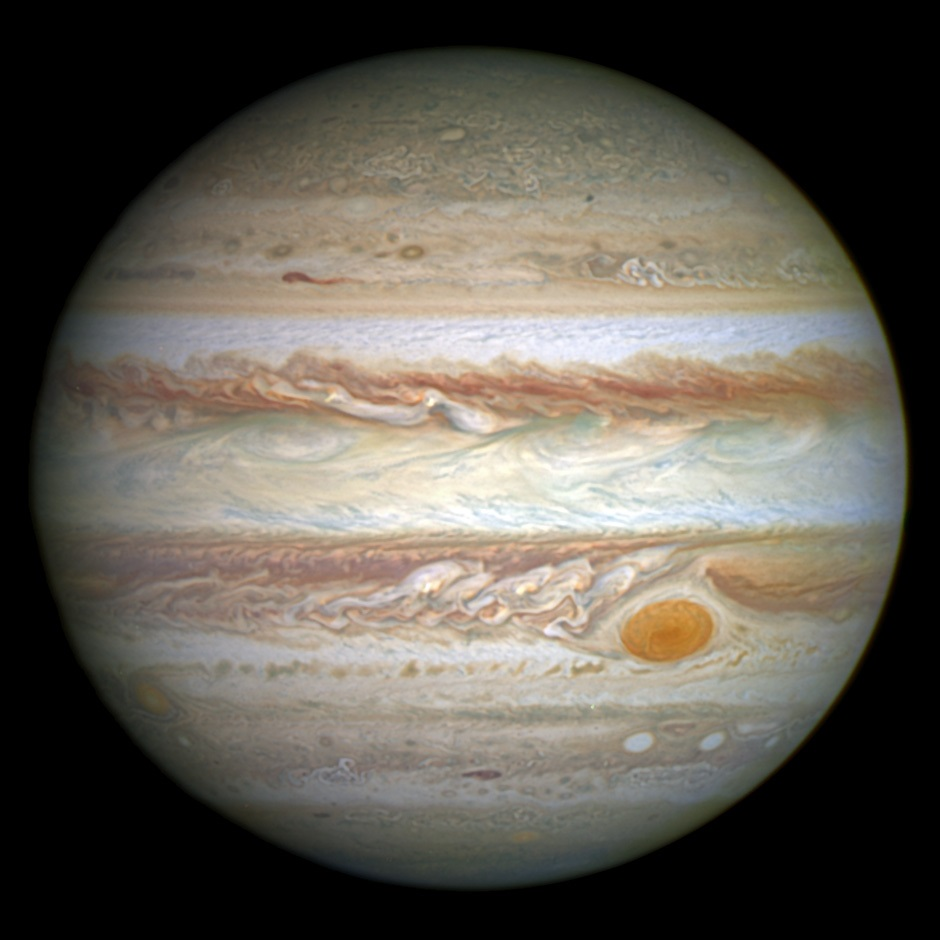
Many scenes take place on the fictional Jupiter Station, located near the planet Jupiter (pictured)

Voyager receives a message from Starfleet Command via the improved subspace radio amplifier, stating they believe they have found a way to bring Voyager back to the Alpha Quadrant within five to six years, instead of the decades they had before them. Elated, the crew send back data regarding their journey to date. In Starfleet's reply, they learn that Lewis Zimmerman, the creator of the Doctor's Emergency Medical Hologram program, is dying and no Starfleet medical personnel can determine the reason. The Doctor expresses that because of his experiences in the Delta Quadrant, he may have more insight to Zimmerman's condition, and asks to have his program transferred via subspace to help.

After eliminating several of his extraneous subroutines to reduce the program size, the Doctor is sent to a space station orbiting near Jupiter. The station has been Zimmerman's home for the last four years, where he spent much time researching hologram technology, and the entire facility is enabled to allow the Doctor and Zimmerman's holographic female servant, Haley, free rein. The Doctor meets with Reginald Barclay, who has been assigned to help Zimmerman, before meeting his creator in person. Zimmerman quickly proves to be old and cantankerous, looking down on the Doctor as one of his earlier, outdated Mark I programs that are now all reassigned to perform menial jobs. The Doctor attempts to prove his value to allow examination, but Zimmerman ignores him, and even one point manipulating the Doctor's program to make him his pet for a few hours. The Doctor grows frustrated in trying to help, and the two stop speaking to each other.

With Zimmerman's health declining, Barclay is able to gain the help of Deanna Troi to help resolve the situation between the two. After meeting with both, she realizes that both Zimmerman and the Doctor seem to be beyond the point of reason. While discussing the situation, they realize that Haley is a far less advanced hologram program than the Doctor is, yet Zimmerman speaks openly and kindly with her. Troi suspects that Zimmerman's behavior is one of injured pride, and devises a plan where they secretly fiddle with the Doctor's files as to make it appear that his program is failing. Troi and Barclay insist that only Zimmerman can save the Doctor, just as the Doctor can only save him.

Zimmerman finally is able get past his wounded pride of the fate of his Mark Is, and fixes the Doctor's program. Zimmerman attempts to add additional programming to the Doctor, but he insists that he is good the way he is. The Doctor then examines Zimmerman, and opts to try an experimental cellular regeneration therapy he had developed while on Voyager. The process is successful, and Zimmerman is soon back in good health. Zimmerman apologizes for his behavior and tells the Doctor that he is proud of him as the only Mark I that has gone well beyond his original programming. After saying his goodbyes, the Doctor is returned to Voyager and Zimmerman continues his hologram research.

== Characters ==
Voyager forms part of The Next Generation TV series "trilogy", and extends many elements from that Universe including characters that appeared from elsewhere in the franchise. Barclay, Troi, and the Doctor played by the same actors also appear in feature films.

Major characters in the episode:

- Reginald Barclay
- Deanna Troi
- The Doctor
- Doctor Lewis Zimmerman
- Haley (Zimmerman's assistant)

There are also several scenes back on Voyager that include the usual primary Voyager crew members. There is also a scene by an Admiral Hayes that plays as a recording for Janeway and Chakotay.

== Setting ==
The episode takes place in two previously introduced locations in the fictional Star Trek universe.

- USS Voyager (At the time on the other side of the Galaxy)
- Jupiter Station (Near Jupiter of Earth's system)

== Reception ==
The episode was noted as one of the top twenty funniest episodes of the Star Trek franchise. (The franchise had over 700 plus television episodes at that time)

In 2017, Den of Geek included this on their abbreviated watch guide for Star Trek: Voyager, picking out this episode on their cross-overs roadmap pointing out the role of Barclay.

In 2020, Gizmodo ranked this one of the "must watch" episodes from the series.

In 2020, The Digital Fix said it was enjoyable to see Troi and Barclay, and they said Robert Picardo delivered "two terrific performances as both characters" playing both the Doctor (EMH) and Doctor Zimmerman.

== See also ==
- Inside Man (Star Trek: Voyager) (Barclay's next Voyager episode)
- "Pathfinder"
- Hologram
