= Unity (Star Trek: Voyager) =

- Star Trek: Voyager episode
- Episode no.: Season 3 Episode 17
- Directed by: Robert Duncan McNeill
- Written by: Kenneth Biller
- Production code: 159
- Original air date: February 12, 1997

Guest appearances
- Lori Hallier – Riley Frazier; Ivar Brogger – Orum; Susan Patterson – Ensign Kaplan

Episode chronology
← Previous "Blood Fever"	Next → "Darkling"
- Star Trek: Voyager season 3

"Unity" is the 17th episode of the third season of the American science fiction television series Star Trek: Voyager, the 59th episode overall. The episode first aired on the UPN network on February 12, 1997, as part of sweeps week. It was written by producer Kenneth Biller, and is the second episode to be directed by cast member Robert Duncan McNeill. It marked the first major appearance of the Borg in Voyager, which were kicked off with a teaser ending in the prior episode.

Set in the 24th century, the series follows the adventures of the Starfleet and Maquis crew of the starship USS Voyager after they were stranded in the Delta Quadrant far from the rest of the Federation. In this episode, while on an away mission, Chakotay is taken in by a group of former Borg who seek help from the crew of Voyager to reactivate their neural link. The ex-Borg force Chakotay to reactivate a Borg cube (a large Borg spaceship), but, in their new-found "Co-operative", the ex-Borg make the cube self-destruct, saving Voyager.

Biller was influenced by the story of the Tower of Babel in writing the episode, and also considered the dissolution of the Soviet Union to be an influence. The crew re-used the make-up and costumes of the Borg designed for the film Star Trek: First Contact, but sets were not re-used. A new fully computer generated Borg cube was created for "Unity", and the storyline of the episode was intended as a hint to those in the later two-part episode "Scorpion". According to Nielsen ratings, it received a 5.4/8 percent share of the audience on first broadcast. "Unity" was received positively by critics, with praise directed at McNeill's direction as well as Biller's plot.

== Plot ==
Commander Chakotay (Robert Beltran) and Ensign Kaplan (Susan Patterson) hear a distress call while scouting ahead for Voyager in a shuttlecraft. They land the vessel but come under fire from hostile aliens, killing Kaplan and injuring Chakotay. He wakes in a room with a woman called Riley Frazier (Lori Hallier). She informs him that she is part of a group of survivors on the planet from a variety of races. There are other groups nearby, including those that attacked him. She calls her group a "Co-operative".

Meanwhile, the USS Voyager discovers a derelict Borg cube and Captain Kathryn Janeway (Kate Mulgrew) decides that an investigation is required in order to learn more about the Borg's technology. An away team boards the cube, discovering that either an accident or another species disabled the vessel. They take a Borg drone back onto Voyager, where the Doctor (Robert Picardo) accidentally revives it.

After being told by Frazier to remain where he is, Chakotay breaks out of his room where he sees that all the people around him on the alien planet possess Borg implant technology in their bodies. Frazier explains that an electro-kinetic storm broke their link with the Borg hive mind. Instead, the separated drones settled on a nearby planet. Because the connection between them was deactivated, different groups soon started fighting each other over the planet's limited resources. As Chakotay's health gets worse, the ex-Borg offer to connect him to a joint mind to heal his injuries, and he reluctantly accepts. Once part of the hive mind, he sees a montage of their memories. The ex-Borg remove the connection device as soon as Chakotay's health improves, however a residual telepathic link lingers and allows Chakotay and Frazier to get closer.

After Voyager arrives, Frazier and her group want Janeway to re-activate the neuroelectric generator on the damaged cube to extend a new joint mind across the entire planet, in order to stop the infighting. Chakotay pleads their case, but Janeway decides not to help them. As Chakotay returns to Voyager on board a shuttle, the Co-operative are attacked by hostile groups and use their telepathic link to force him to travel to the Borg cube, with Voyager in pursuit. Both Chakotay and an away team board the cube, and despite a firefight, he manages to reactivate the generator. This creates the new joint mind as expected, but also activates the cube, which begins powering up to attack Voyager. Chakotay and the away team are beamed back to Voyager as the Co-operative trigger the cube's self-destruct before it can endanger the Federation ship. The planet's inhabitants thank Voyager, but as a result of their actions, Chakotay later questions the morality of the Co-operative's motives with Janeway, as it connected many of the former Borg together in a new hive mind without consulting them.

== Production ==
=== Writing and background ===
The producers had wanted to bring the Borg into Voyager, which resulted in numerous pitches from a variety of writers. There were concerns from some of the crew that the events of the film Star Trek: First Contact effectively destroyed the Borg, but executive producer Rick Berman clarified both that the death of the Borg Queen in the film did not mean the destruction of the entire collective and that there were other Borg remaining in the Delta Quadrant. The alien race had made their first appearance in the Star Trek: The Next Generation episode "Q Who" and, at the time of the original broadcast of "Unity", had recently appeared in First Contact. The idea of Borg being separated from the collective had previously been seen in the episode of The Next Generation entitled "I, Borg" with the resultant effect seen in the two-part "Descent". "Unity" was written by producer Kenneth Biller, with the final version of the script being submitted on November 7, 1996. Though the film had not been released at the time he drafted the episode, Biller had read the First Contact script before writing the "Unity" script.

Biller sought to give a more interesting look at the Borg, rather than simply focusing on their pursuit of assimilation. With this in mind, he thought of an idea based upon the Tower of Babel. He said that the Borg was a "incredibly interwoven, complex community" and "once you knocked it all down you would have all these people who spoke different languages, and couldn't communicate with each other. It occurred to me that a group of ex-Borg would be a very interesting community to explore." He wanted the potential reunification of the ex-Borg to be a moral dilemma. This was based on the growing favorable views of Communism in the Eastern bloc during the mid-1990s after the dissolution of the Soviet Union.

=== Direction and editing ===
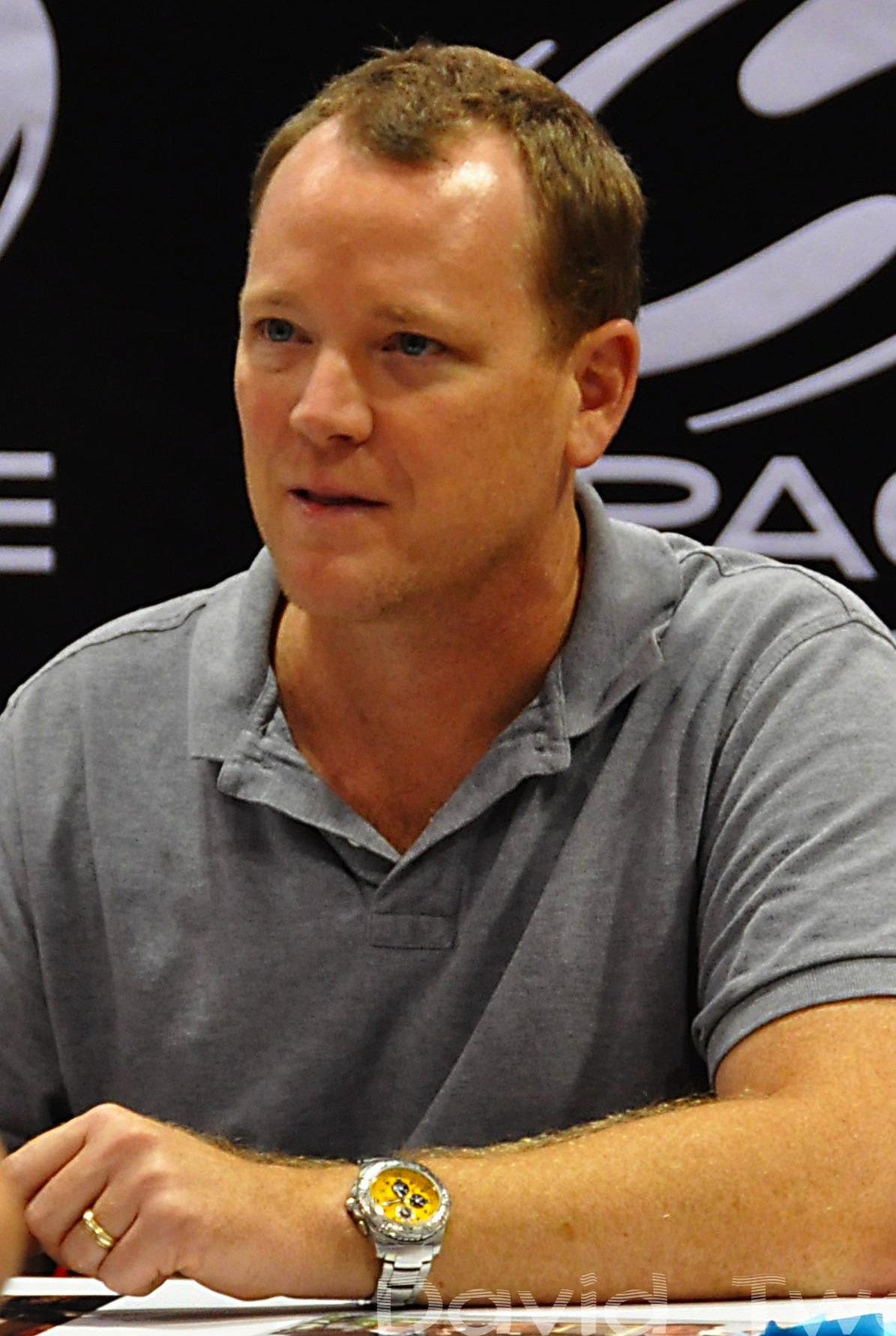
"Unity" was the second episode to be directed by Robert Duncan McNeill

"Unity" was the second episode of Voyager to be directed by Robert Duncan McNeill following "Sacred Ground" from earlier in the season. He felt a great deal of pressure working on the episode which introduced the Borg to Voyager, and complained to the producers that the aliens only appear on two and a half pages of the script. He felt pressure in trying to produce something significant regarding the Borg because of the release of First Contact a few months earlier, and wanted to do something equally as exciting but without being repetitive. Instead, he wanted to give the viewer a sense of suspense and mystery regarding the people that Chakotay meets even if they do not appear to be Borg. McNeill saw "Unity" as being a type of film noir, with Chakotay being seduced by the Devil during the course of the story, and wanted to have a strong focus on this direction throughout the episode.

This vision was included in the cinematography for the episode, with one scene having Captain Janeway stand over Chakotay's shoulder much in the same way that a guardian angel would. The set-up for that particular scene came from a collaboration between McNeill and actress Kate Mulgrew. From that, he developed a series of close-up shots to bring some intimacy to the scene. The montage scene in the episode was created by McNeill, Biller, Jeri Taylor, Bob Ledermen and Wendy Neuss using footage from the episodes "Q Who" in The Next Generation, "Caretaker" from Voyager, as well as both "Emissary" and "The Way of the Warrior" from Deep Space Nine.

McNeill also agreed with Biller's view that "Unity" was a metaphor for the break-up of the USSR, and McNeill read up on the subject before directing the episode, saying that "I think some of those ideas did come out in the story, even though it wasn't a really heavy, political episode. Yet there were some references and you could connect that to contemporary issues, individuality as opposed to group needs or desires." McNeill was very happy with the resulting episode, saying that the Borg "were not as one-dimensional as previously depicted, but still as evil as ever", and hoped to direct two or three more episodes in the following season. By the end of Voyager, he had directed four episodes overall; this signalled a change in direction for his career into directing full-time.

=== Design and special effects ===
To represent the ex-Borg colony on the planet, sets previously used for the episodes "The Chute" and "Fair Trade" from earlier in the season were used. This was further extended by the use of a computer generated matte painting created by freelancer Eric Chauvin. Borg sets from First Contact were not re-used, but instead a new set was built. This new set measured 40 feet (12 m) in length curved around in a semi-circle, and McNeill was unsatisfied with this size. He said "It was the smallest set that I've ever seen in my life. We had no room on the stage to build a big Borg ship, because the other sets took up so much room." He hoped that they had hidden this on camera, with it instead appearing as a series of separate corridors within the Borg vessel. McNeill explained that he had the actors walk the length of the set past the camera at the end, at which point a cut was made and they would go back to the start of the corridor to start filming again.

Despite not using the sets, the episode did re-use the Borg costumes from First Contact, which McNeill described as "the scarier Borg" compared to those seen previously in The Next Generation. This caused some problems with filming as an animatronic Borg arm used for the film was malfunctioning, leading to the production being stalled for several hours. For First Contact, the Borg had been re-designed by Michael Westmore and Deborah Everton. The former and his makeup team had worked on the look of the heads, which included a variety of different Borg appliances which could be mixed and matched to create an ongoing variety of looks. For example, Westmore's colleague Jake Garber had created ten different eye pieces. Everton, meanwhile, created the costumes for the Borg, and wanted them to be more elaborate than in previous appearances. This has been done with a view that individuals should look as if they had been transformed from the inside out, rather than the other way around.

"Unity" also saw the first use of a fully computer generated Borg cube on screen. Those previously seen in the Star Trek franchise had been physical models, including the version seen in First Contact. It was constructed by Emile Edwin Smith at Foundation Imaging, who mapped a cube with an image before creating raised areas with further detail. In order to make it look more three dimensional, he added interconnecting tubes and edge pieces to the model. He explained on the Usenet newsgroup rec.arts.startrek.current that the episode used around 90 percent of shots featuring the new cube, while the remainder were stock footage created for earlier episodes. Visual effects supervisor Mitch Suskin was pleased with the explosion of the Borg cube at the end of the episode, saying that "the only element was the explosion, the rest was accomplished in the CG domain. It was a real breakthrough. That was the first show that I really had no reservations about."

=== Later influence ===
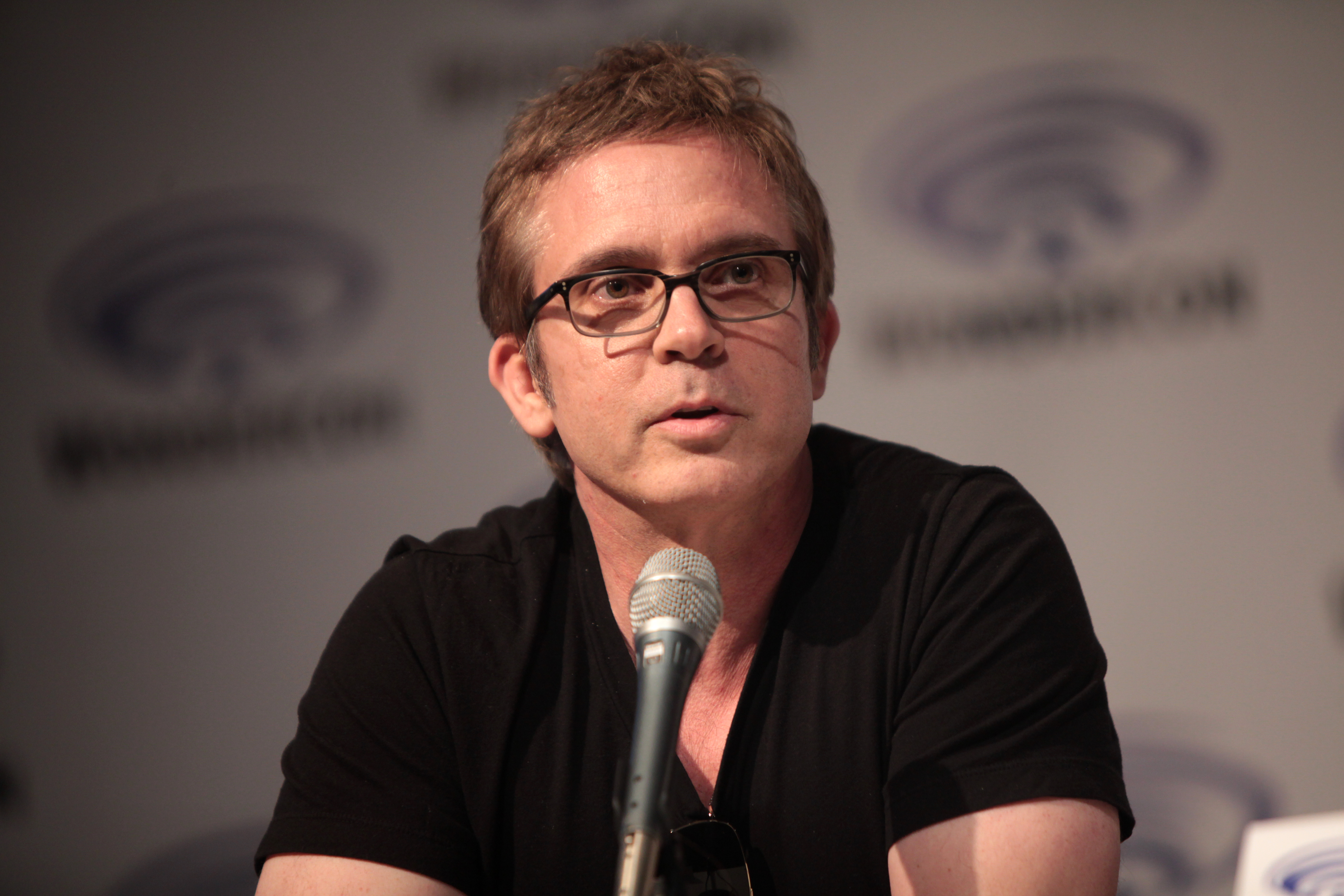
Brannon Braga said that there were no plans to bring the Borg Co-operative back to Voyager

When later discussing the end of season episode "Scorpion" (part one), Brannon Braga said that the destroyed cube which appeared in "Unity" had a direct link to the action in that episode, as they wanted to hint at an alien species who could successfully fight the Borg. However, he also explained that there was no plans to bring back the "Co-operative" as seen in "Unity", saying that "The Co-operative is long gone, man. It's been months since we've seen the Co-operative. That's not to say we won't learn someday what happened to them. That's kind of an interesting question." They returned in "Delta Rising", an expansion for Star Trek Online, where they had grown to encompass a large number of liberated Borg, including their vessels.

It was originally intended to include a "Borg graveyard" in space in "Unity", similar to the vision of the destroyed Federation ships seen after the Battle of Wolf 359 in The Next Generation episode "The Best of Both Worlds". The scene was instead shown in the first part of "Scorpion". One link remained in the "Unity" script: Riley Frazier was stated to have been abducted by the Borg while she was on the USS Roosevelt during the battle.

== Reception ==
=== Ratings ===
"Unity" was first broadcast on February 12, 1997, on the UPN network within the United States. According to the Nielsen ratings, it received a 5.4/8 share, meaning it was watched by 5.4 percent of all households and 8 percent of all households watching television at the time of broadcast. This broadcast was during sweeps week, a period used to calculate advertising revenue for the forthcoming quarter. During this time, networks will often attempt to maximise the potential ratings received by their programming. "Unity" was the highest rated episode of Voyager since the second part of "Future's End", broadcast on November 13, 1996.

In the United Kingdom, the episode was first broadcast on July 21, 1997 on Sky One where it was watched by 0.502 million viewers. This was the highest number of viewers for July for an episode of Voyager on that channel, the next best being "Coda" with 0.428 million. The most watched science fiction broadcast on the channel during that month was "Gethsemane", an episode of The X-Files, with 1.164 million viewers.

=== Critical and fan reception ===
David Bianculli, while previewing the episode for the New York Daily News, called the plot "clever" and the suggestion that another alien race had defeated the Borg an "interesting possible springboard for future episodes". Regarding the direction and the writing, he said that McNeil directed with "a flair and pace that enhances all of Biller's many plot twists", and said that it was the best part of the season so far. Jamahl Epsicokhan, writing on his website Jammers Reviews, praised the special effects seen in "Unity", and added that "McNeill's direction is effective, the story is fresh and implicitly complex, the production is impressive, and the action and suspense works. This is not the best episode of Voyager, but it's among them." He gave the episode a score of three and a half out of four.

The episode was given a score of eight out of ten in Dreamwatch magazine, with the review saying that it delivered a "philosophical meditation on the nature of power" asking "does the possession automatically corrupt the possessor?" It praised the nature of the episode, saying the plot was "very clever". But the review said that the ending was ambiguous about whether or not Chakotay agrees with what he is doing on behalf of the Co-operative. When reviewing the third season for the website DVD Talk, Holly E. Ordway described "Unity" as being "noteworthy as an episode with more depth and complexity than the typical Voyager episode thus far", and said that it was likely to be remembered by the fans as the episode which introduced the Borg to the series. She added that the plot was "well thought out" and that the ending left the viewer with a moral dilemma over whether it was the right thing to do.

In his book Delta Quadrant, David McIntee gave the episode a rating of seven out of ten, while Anna L. Kaplan—writing for the magazine Cinefantastique—rated "Unity" as three and a half out of four. Lou Anders reviewed the episode for Star Trek Monthly, saying that McNeill did an "excellent job in his second foray as director, bringing a very dark and exciting feeling to the episode." Anders gave "Unity" a score of three out of five. The fan reaction to the episode was mostly positive, with the exception of those who were pushing for an ongoing liaison between Chakotay and Janeway; such fans did not approve of the implied temporary romantic entanglement between Chakotay and the ex-Borg Riley.

== Home media release ==
The first home media release of "Unity" was on a two-episode VHS cassette alongside "Darkling" on July 21, 1997 in the United Kingdom. The first VHS release in the United States was as a single episode release on September 3, 2002. "Unity" was released on DVD as part of the season three box set, released on July 6, 2004, in the United States. This was followed in the UK on September 6, 2004.

By the 2010s, this episode was also made available at various Internet streaming television providers of this period, including Netflix and CBS All Access.
