= Rise (Star Trek: Voyager) =

- Star Trek: Voyager episode
- Episode no.: Season 3 Episode 19
- Directed by: Robert Scheerer
- Written by: Brannon Braga
- Story by: Jimmy Diggs
- Production code: 160
- Original air date: February 26, 1997

Guest appearances
- Alan Oppenheimer - Nezu Ambassador; Lisa Kaminir - Lillias; Kelly Connell - Sklar; Tom Towles - Dr. Vatm; Geof Prysirr - Hanjuan; Gary Bullock - Goth

Episode chronology
← Previous "Darkling"	Next → "Favorite Son"
- Star Trek: Voyager season 3

"Rise!" is the 61st episode of Star Trek: Voyager, the 19th episode of the third season. The episode debuted on February 26, 1997 on UPN. This episode focuses on the characters Neelix and Tuvok on an away mission. It was written by Brannon Braga from a story by Jimmy Diggs, and directed by Robert Scheerer.

In the 24th century, two crewmembers of a starship try to help aliens, but when their shuttlecraft crashes, they must evacuate by space elevator. However, on the journey up they encounter unexpected difficulties with the aliens they are trying to help, even as they try to manage their own relationship.

== Overview ==
The story by Jimmy Diggs was inspired by the 1965 film The Flight of the Phoenix.

This episode is noted for being set on a space elevator.

== Plot ==
Voyager is trying to help a planet bombarded by deadly asteroids, but vaporising the asteroids proves to be impossible. A local astrophysicist, Dr Vatm, contacts Voyager and starts to explain that the asteroids are artificial, but his connection is cut short.

Tuvok and Neelix are assigned to look for Dr Vatm, but due to turbulence, their shuttle crash-lands on the planet. After Dr Vatm and a miner called Hanjuan find them, they discuss how to contact Voyager. Neelix sees a maglev space elevator in the distance and suggests it as a way out. He and Tuvok repair it and they all begin to ascend, but numerous problems ensue. When Dr Vatm dies unexpectedly, Neelix and Tuvok must identify the murderer.

On Voyager, the crew discovers that the asteroids are being sent by the Etanian Order, who intend to create a natural disaster to force the planet's inhabitants to leave so that they can colonise it. On the elevator, Tuvok and Neelix discover that a traitor called Sklar had been hiding a data pad with tactical information about an alien ship. After they and the remaining survivors are rescued, the Voyager crew forces the attacking Etanians into retreat using that information.

During this episode Neelix confronts Tuvok about his supercilious attitude, and the two reach a better understanding.

== Reception ==
In 2004, Trek Today said that "Tim Russ and Ethan Phillips did a terrific job holding interest" and that it worked as a relationship episode. They point it was also action story, but with a "cliched but sweet learning to get along" story for Tuvok and Neelix.

In a review in 2020 by Tor.com, they said this episode was good as a stand-alone Voyager episode, with a great science fiction concept (the space tether) and some action. However, they had some reservations about the dynamics between Tuvok and Neelix after "Fair Trade" and "Tuvix". Overall they gave the episode 5 out of 10.

In 2021, Comic Book Resources highlighted "Rise" as an example of an ambitious episode in season 3 that presented "reliable sci-fi concepts in new and interesting ways".

== Media releases ==
This episode was released on DVD on July 6, 2004 as part of Star Trek Voyager: Complete Third Season, with Dolby 5.1 surround audio. The season 3 DVD was released in the UK on September 6, 2004.

In 2017, the complete Star Trek: Voyager television series was released in a DVD box set, which included it as part of the season 3 discs.
