= Blood Fever (Star Trek: Voyager) =

- Star Trek: Voyager episode
- Episode no.: Season 3 Episode 16
- Directed by: Andrew J. Robinson
- Written by: Lisa Klink
- Production code: 316
- Original air date: February 5, 1997

Guest appearances
- Alexander Enberg - Vorik; Bruce Bohne - Ishan; Elle Alexander - Sakari; Deborah Levin - Ens. Lang; Amy Jo Traicoff - T'Pera

Episode chronology
| ← Previous "Coda" | Next → "Unity" |
- Star Trek: Voyager season 3

"Blood Fever" is the 58th episode of Star Trek: Voyager, the 16th episode of the third season. The episode aired on UPN on February 5, 1997. This episode focuses on life aboard the Federation spacecraft USS Voyager, stranded on the opposite side of the galaxy to Earth. Even with its fictional faster than light warp drive, it will take decades to return normally. This show focuses on the characters B'Elanna Torres, Ensign Vorik and Tom Paris, and explores the nature of the Vulcans.

== Plot ==
The Vulcan Ensign Vorik proposes marriage to B'Elanna Torres. Flabbergasted, she declines. He grabs her, cradling her face, and she punches him. As he mends Vorik's dislocated jaw in Sickbay, The Doctor discovers that the ensign is beginning his first "pon farr". He is in a sexual frenzy and requires a mate, a ritual fight known as "kunat kalifee", or intensive meditation. Vorik opts to meditate.

Meanwhile, Torres joins Tom Paris and Neelix for an away mission to collect "gallicite" from an abandoned mine. She becomes increasingly aggressive and agitated, refusing to cooperate with her teammates, and then attacks Paris, biting him on the cheek and stalking off on her own. Paris' description of her behavior to Voyager leads Tuvok to conclude that she has contracted "pon farr" from Vorik, since the ensign had initiated a telepathic mating bond when he seized her face.

"Wait, please. Please, I'm. I see that you've given this a lot of, er, logical thought and I really am very flattered, but my answer is no. I'm sorry. "

— The character B'Elanna Torres to Vorik's proposition for a relationship

Tuvok and Chakotay travel to the planet's surface and descend into the mine to help Paris hunt down Torres. They tell her that her discomfort is from the "pon farr", and she needs to return with them to the ship. Before they can persuade her, the away team is surrounded by aliens called the Sakari; the mine is not abandoned after all. The aliens disappear and take Tuvok and Chakotay with them.

Now alone with Paris in the mine, Torres is determined to have sex with him, having already chosen him as her mate with the bite on the cheek. He admits that he would like to oblige her, but refuses to take advantage of her altered mental state.

Tuvok and Chakotay discover that the aliens are peaceful but paranoid, having hidden underground from previous invaders on their planet. Voyager agrees to help the Sakari better hide themselves. Back on the surface, Tuvok advises Paris to have sex with Torres to help purge the "pon farr". He awkwardly agrees, but before the two can copulate, Vorik storms in to claim Torres, challenging Paris to the "kunat kalifee". Torres declares that she will fight Vorik herself. Both fight aggressively, and both are purged of their "pon farr". Afterwards, she and Paris admit to each other that they might have a future together.

"Careful what you wish for, Lieutenant. "

— The character B'Elanna Torres

As the away team prepares to leave the planet, they make a horrifying discovery: the invaders the Sakari were running from were Borg.

== Reception ==
Jammer's Reviews rated this episode 3 out of 4 stars, calling it "par for the course...a fairly diverting hour" and noting that it "is basically 'Amok Time' in the Delta Quadrant." Jamahl Epsicokhan used the words "shallow" and "glib" for some aspects, and "superficial" and "transparent" specifically for Vorik's appearance at the end where he invokes the Koon-ut-kalifee to win Torres as his mate. What he found "most impacting" was the end-reveal of the Borg corpse, a threat that could potentially "re-energize the series."

== Media releases ==
This episode was released on DVD on July 6, 2004 as part of Star Trek Voyager: Complete Third Season, with Dolby 5.1 surround audio. The season 3 DVD was released in the UK on September 6, 2004.

In 2017, the complete Star Trek: Voyager television series was released in a DVD box set, which included it as part of the season 3 discs.
