= Favorite Son (Star Trek: Voyager) =

- Star Trek: Voyager episode
- Episode no.: Season 3 Episode 20
- Directed by: Marvin V. Rush
- Written by: Lisa Klink
- Production code: 162
- Original air date: March 19, 1997
- Running time: 45 minutes

Guest appearances
- Christopher Carroll as Alben; Cari Shayne as Eliann; Deborah May as Lyris; Patrick Fabian as Taymon; Kelli Kirkland as Rinna; Kristanna Loken as Malia; Irene Tsu as Mary Kim; Kenny Yee as Young Harry Kim

Episode chronology
← Previous "Rise"	Next → "Before and After"
- Star Trek: Voyager season 3

"Favorite Son" is an episode of the American science fiction television series Star Trek: Voyager. First broadcast on UPN on March 19, 1997, it was the 20th episode of the third season. Lisa Klink wrote and Marvin V. Rush directed the episode. Set in the 24th century, the show follows the adventures of the crew of the starship USS Voyager after they are stranded in the Delta Quadrant, far from the rest of the Federation.

In the episode, Ensign Harry Kim (Garrett Wang) experiences déjà vu and develops a rash when the Voyager enters a new sector of the Delta Quadrant. Mostly female aliens known as Taresians tell him that he is not human but is a member of their species. On discovering this is a ruse by the female aliens to attract and kill their men during reproduction, the crew rescues Kim and restores him to his original state. Deborah May and Kristanna Loken play two of the Taresians, Patrick Fabian portrays a man tricked by them and Irene Tsu appears as Kim's mother.

Klink originally developed the script to reveal that Kim is an alien, but this concept was abandoned following multiple rewrites. Wang preferred the original idea, believing it gave his character greater depth and further storyline opportunities. However, the show's writers thought it would be too unbelievable. During filming, the cast and crew adapted the plot as a take on a male fantasy, and Rush modeled the Taresians on geishas. Scholars have discussed "Favorite Son" as a reference to Odysseus' encounter with the Sirens, and analyzed the Taresians' method of sexual reproduction. According to Nielsen, the episode was watched by 6.17 million viewers, a drop from the previous week. The show's cast and crew had a mixed response to "Favorite Son", while the episode received largely negative reviews from critics who viewed the Taresians as sexist stereotypes.

== Plot ==
On entering a new sector of the Delta Quadrant, the USS Voyager meet the Nasari for the first time. Although the aliens show no hostility, Ensign Harry Kim fires on their starship, and claims he knew clairvoyantly they were preparing an attack. Despite sustaining heavy damage, Voyager escapes, and Captain Kathryn Janeway suspends Kim from duty. Kim notices a rash on his face after having strange dreams, and The Doctor cannot identify its cause. After Janeway confirms Kim was right about the Nasari, he recounts other moments of déjà vu. The Nasari return, and Kim instinctively advises the crew to flee to the nearby planet, Taresia. There, they are defended by the Taresians, and their leader Lyris greets Kim as a member of her species. She says Kim was sent to Earth as an embryo and implanted in a human woman. He then assumed genetic traits from his human parents, but his DNA kept certain characteristics, including an urge for space exploration. Lyris attributes Kim's recent actions to the reactivation of his dormant Taresian genes.

After befriending a male Taresian, Taymon, Kim learns that since the Taresians are predominantly female, men are treated as valuable. He participates in Taymon's marriage ceremony with three women. Meanwhile, Voyager attempts to negotiate with the Nasari captain Alben for safe passage. The Doctor discovers Kim is human and a retrovirus implanted the Taresian genes. The Taresians activate a polaron grid blocking communication or transportation with the planet. Kim increasingly doubts his situation, resisting sexual advances from two women, and finds Taymon's desiccated remains. The Taresians inform him their method of reproduction involves draining the male's DNA, and they harvest men from alien species to compensate for their exclusively female population. After penetrating the grid, Voyager rescues Kim and escape amidst the Nasari's battle with the Taresians. After the foreign DNA is extracted from his system, Kim talks to Neelix about Odysseus' encounter with the Sirens.

== Production ==
=== Concept and development ===
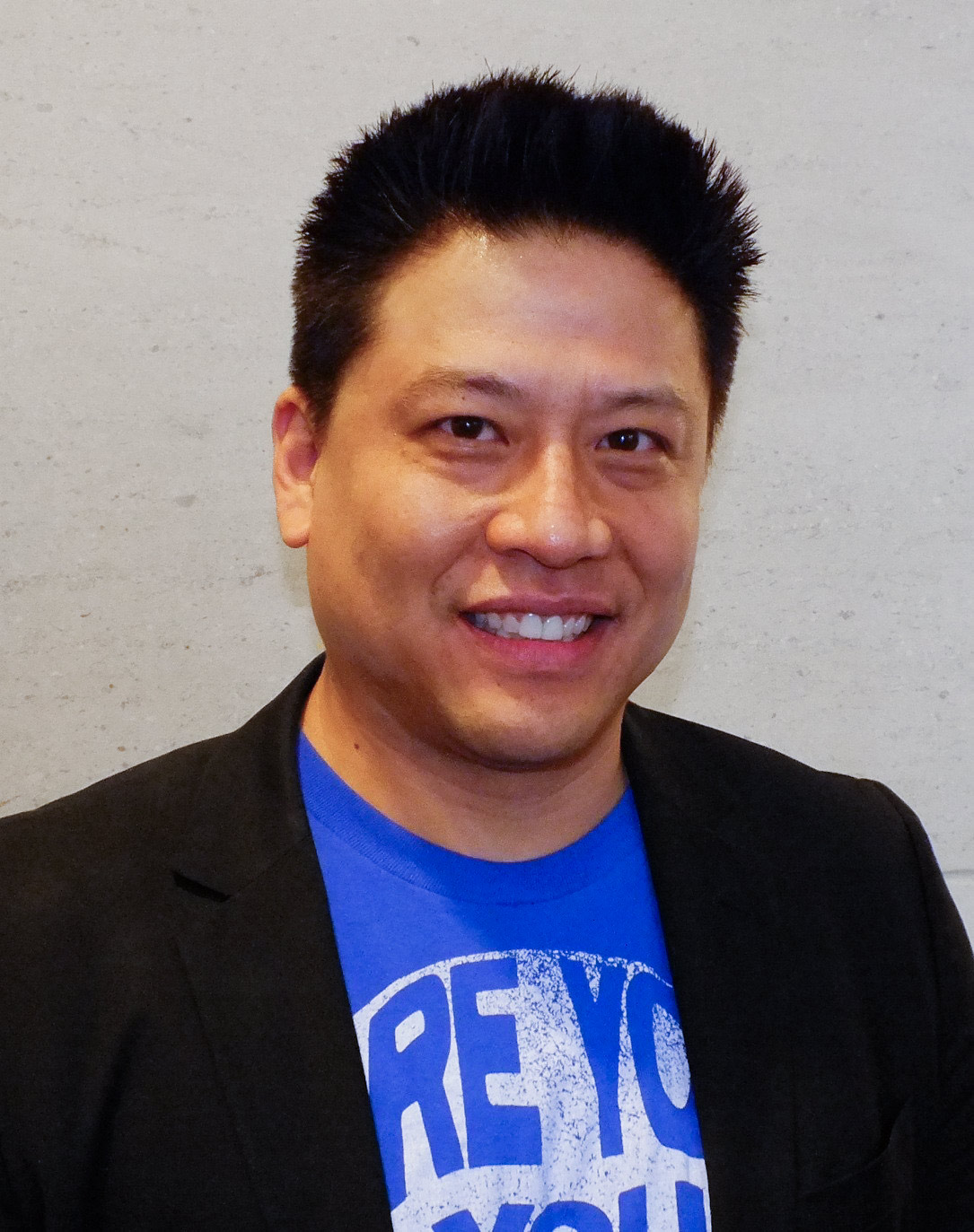
"Favorite Son" focused on Harry Kim, a character played by Garrett Wang (pictured in 2013).

In her original script, Lisa Klink intended for "Favorite Son" to reveal Harry Kim was really an alien, a storyline that would have continued throughout the series. The character would have remained part of Voyager's crew after struggling with the news. Kim's actor Garrett Wang explained in a 1998 The Official Star Trek: Voyager Magazine interview that this would have included him keeping the alien prosthetics in future episodes. The series' writing team thought it would be ironic to have Kim be an alien since he was the crew member most eager to return to the Alpha Quadrant.

According to the director, Marvin V. Rush, "Favorite Son" underwent more rewrites than an average episode. The writers found Kim's alien identity "just too wild a turn", and revised the script so he remained human. As a result, "Favorite Son" was one of several Star Trek: Voyager episodes to focus on alien possession and the manipulation of a crew member's memories of their home. When discussing these changes, Klink said the focus remained on Kim's identity crisis, explaining: "He gets to take a walk on the wild side, and then of course discovers that he is who he thought he was all along."

Wang preferred the initial concept, saying it provided Kim with more depth and story opportunities; he explained: "I had always said that it was easier to write for the non-Human characters on Voyager than the Human characters." Rush and Wang believed the script's changes had muddied the story unnecessarily. According to Wang, the episode was developed and revised through a collaborative approach; he explained: "You have three or four different opinions of how this episode should be written, and all of a sudden you have no clear delineation of where this episode should go." Wang thought this method weakened the story and viewed "Favorite Son" as disappointing compared to "The Chute", an earlier season three episode. With the addition of the Taresians, he said "everything got flipped around" from the original script. He attributed the inclusion of these "vampire-like, blood-sucking women" to the studio executives' insistence that the episode have more action and sex appeal.

=== Casting and filming ===
According to Rush, the cast and crew further developed the story to be "a male fantasy piece with a dark twist" while filming. Rush wanted to portray the Taresians with a "sense of tastefulness", but said he had difficulty doing so; he explained: "These guest actors had to come in and play very non-'90s women. I had to do a little convincing, but we got there." While describing the characters, he likened them to geishas, and explained the purpose of both was "to be completely captivating to men" with their beauty and intelligence. The Taresians' costumes disappointed Wang, who said they were "these matronly women with no sex appeal instead of babes dressed like I Dream of Jeannie".

Cari Shayne, Kelli Kirkland, and Star Trek: Voyager stunt performer Patricia Tallman played three of the Taresians. Two of the episode's guest stars—Deborah May and Christopher Carroll—had appeared previously in the Star Trek: Deep Space Nine episodes "Sanctuary" and "Second Skin", respectively. Irene Tsu, who appeared as Kim's mother, would reprise her role in the season seven episode "Author, Author".

"Favorite Son" was filmed before and after the show's Christmas break, a scheduling decision that Rush said made it difficult to maintain focus on set. For the scene in which the Taresians confront Kim, Rush had the set's ceiling removed to provide room for a camera mounted on a rig. He chose an overhead shot to better represent the tension that Kim experiences while being surrounded by the women and barely escaping from them. "Favorite Son" had reshoots, like removing kissing from the marriage scene and dimming the lighting to evoke a "ceremonial, ritual wedding".

The episode reused props from Star Trek: The Next Generation and Star Trek: Deep Space Nine. The Nasari Ship was a Romulan scout ship from "The Defector", and the Taresian star ship was a model used in "Gambit" and "Vortex". During filming, the prop department forgot to inscribe Taresian symbols on their weapons. Art supervisor Michael Okuda and producer Merri Howard went on set and used black markers to correct this.

== Analysis ==
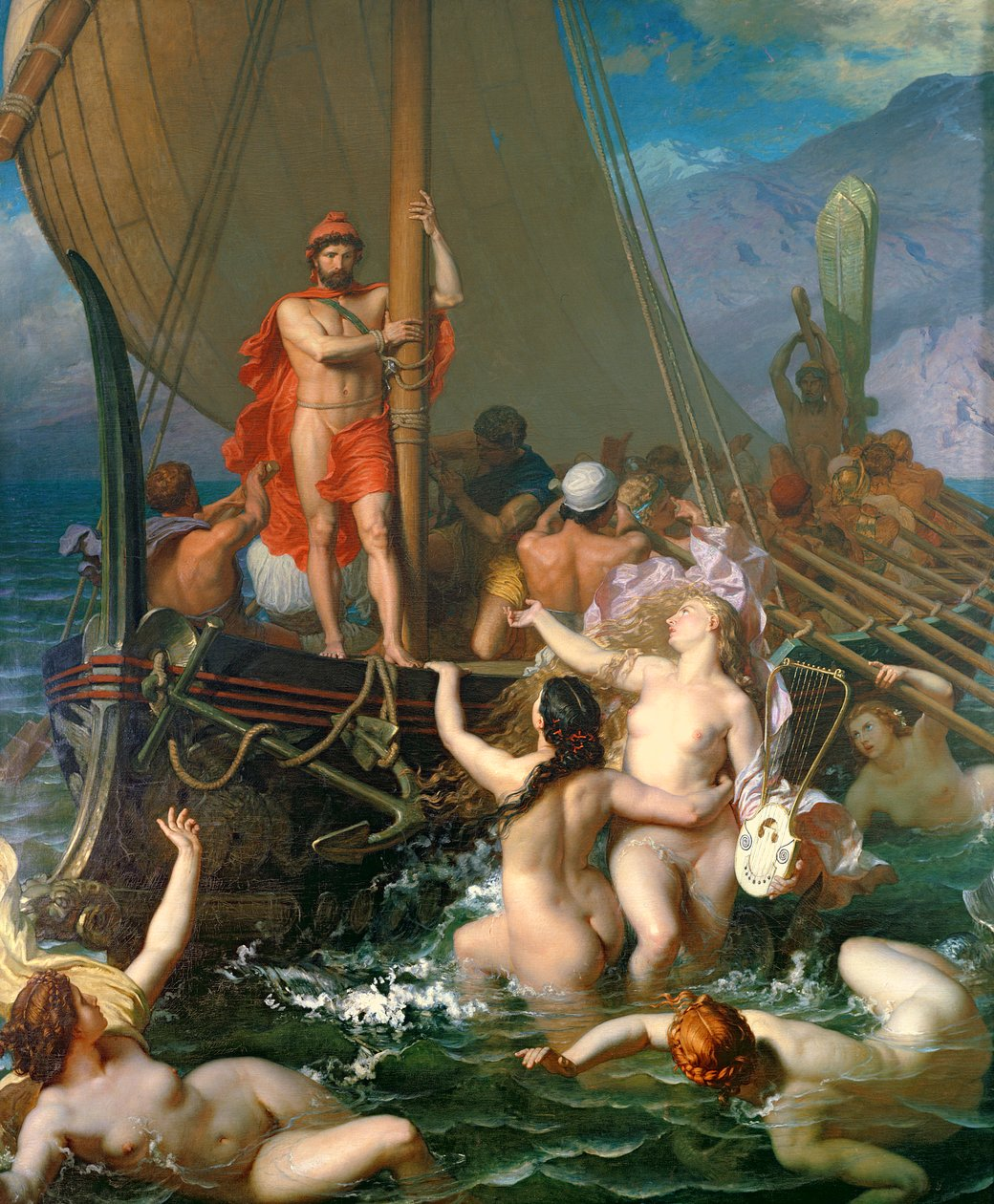
Critics compared the Taresians to Odysseus' encounter with the Sirens in Homer's Odyssey.

Film studies scholar Djoymi Baker described "Favorite Son" as a reinterpretation of the Sirens from Homer's epic poem Odyssey, with Harry Kim playing a role similar to that of Odysseus. While emphasizing Kim has a lower military rank than Odysseus, Baker attributed his weakness to temptation to his more naïve personality and his desire to be seen as important. She wrote that, unlike the Sirens' portrayal as the "holders of great knowledge", the Taresians used the "dangerous nature of female productive power" to lure their victims. Because of the episode's focus on procreation, Baker said the Taresians shared similarities with the Lemnian women from Apollonius of Rhodes' Argonautica.

Baker argued "Favorite Son" regressed to a "type of gender typing often present in the original series" by adapting Odysseus as a male ensign (Kim) rather than the female captain (Janeway). Disagreeing with this assessment, literary critic Kwasu David Tembo said all the series' characters often display "Odyssean characteristics regardless of species, age, or gender". Tembo interpreted Janeway's relationship with Seven of Nine as an example of a siren song distracting her from returning home.

The Taresians' method of reproduction was also the subject of academic analysis. Pediatrician Victor Grech, in a paper on infertility in Star Trek, wrote that "Favorite Son" and the Star Trek: The Animated Series episode "The Lorelei Signal" both involve women using men to "retain their own immortality at the expense of infertility" and convey moments where "men are truly needed, albeit briefly" for fertility. Geneticist Mohamed Noor used "Favorite Son" to discuss DNA transmission and how dominant and recessive traits manifest in offspring. Noor wrote that the episode deals with a retrovirus that inserts DNA into the genome, noting a similar idea was used in "Prophecy". Comparing Star Trek aliens to real animals, he said the Taresians used an aggressive mimicry similar to the ability of Photuris fireflies' ability to mimic other fireflies to attract prey.

== Broadcast history and release ==
"Favorite Son" was first broadcast on March 19, 1997, on UPN at 9 pm Eastern Standard Time in the United States. According to Nielsen, the episode was seen by 6.17 million viewers, which placed it 88th overall for the week. This marked a drop in viewership compared to the previous episode "Rise", which was seen by 6.76 million viewers. The follow-up episode "Before and After" had 6.46 million viewers.

The episode was first released on VHS in 1996 as part of a two-episode collection with "Rise". The packaging uses the British spelling of the title—"Favourite Son"—rather than the American version. "Favorite Son" was included on the DVD release of the third season on July 6, 2004, in the United States. It is also available on streaming and video on demand services.

The VHS packaging draws parallels between "Favorite Son" and the Star Trek: The Original Series episode "Wink of an Eye", where an alien queen attempts to kidnap the USS Enterprise's male crew members to repopulate her planet. However, neither the VHS release nor the DVD special reference "The Lorelei Signal", which Djoymi Baker believed was done to promote Star Trek's live-action shows over its animation. In an interview for the DVD, Garrett Wang cited "Favorite Son" as the first time an Asian-American actor kissed an African-American actress on television. Baker viewed Wang's statement as reminiscent of Kirk and Uhura's kiss in "Plato's Stepchildren", which was one of the first interracial kisses on television. Since the official CBS Studios website for the Star Trek franchise does not connect "Favorite Son" with other Star Trek episodes, Baker said viewers can only make these connections through their own memories.

== Reception ==
=== Cast and crew response ===
"Favorite Son" received a mixed response from the cast and crew. Executive producer Jeri Taylor said the episode, along with "Rise", was one of the worst moments in the third season; she summarized it as an "interesting idea that in the making of it just came off as looking a little silly". Garrett Wang criticized "Favorite Son" for not living up to the original script, but still thought it turned out to be an "OK episode". Marvin V. Rush identified "Favorite Son" as weaker than the past Star Trek episodes he had directed—"The Host" and "The Thaw". Rush praised Wang's performance, and believed the story was enjoyable enough to maintain the audience's attention. When discussing the episode's meaning, he pointed to the scene where Harry Kim rejects the drugs offered by the Taresians, and explained: "If there's a message to that show, that's the scene with the message." Rush concluded while there were various causes of the episode being weak, the fault ultimately laid with him since he was the director.

=== Critical reception ===
Reviews of "Favorite Son" were negative. Fans have referred to it, along with "Darkling" and "Rise", as the "trilogy of terror". According to a 2020 Screen Rant article, IMDb registered users ranked "Favorite Son" as one of the top ten worst Star Trek: Voyager episodes. As part of an overview of the series, Den of Geek!'s Juliette Harrisson considered the episode to be the worst instance of Kim's "doomed romances", a storyline repeated in "The Disease" and "Ashes to Ashes". Keith DeCandido, writing for Tor.com, preferred the original concept, and criticized the twist ending as resulting in multiple plot holes.

Reviewers were critical of the Taresians for being sexist caricature and lacking character development. Screen Rant's Kristy Ambrose disliked the episode's reliance on the "planet of lusty women" trope, writing that the Taresians are portrayed as "shallow, sexist stereotypes that would alienate any female viewer". Although she appreciated the episode's focus on Kim, Ambrose dismissed the story as the equivalent of "incel fan fiction". DeCandido felt the Taresians were generic, and wrote that the episode treats them like "superficial arm candy and not much beyond that".

The Taresians' method of reproduction was also criticized. Harrison found it unrealistic for Kim to believe such an obvious trap; she unfavorably compared the plot to the Red Dwarf episode "Psirens", writing that Kim acts as foolishly as Cat who fell for a similar ploy. DeCandido questioned why the Taresians used this method when they could have used their expertise in genetic engineering to more easily alter their own species to produce more male offspring instead. While discussing the episode's twist, he said answers were not provided for how the Taresians knew enough about Kim's home to convincingly trick him.
