= Alter Ego (Star Trek: Voyager) =

- Star Trek: Voyager episode
- Episode no.: Season 3 Episode 14
- Directed by: Robert Picardo
- Written by: Joe Menosky
- Production code: 155
- Original air date: January 15, 1997

Guest appearances
- Sandra Nelson - Marayna; Alexander Enberg - Vorik; Shay Todd - Holodeck Woman

Episode chronology
← Previous "Fair Trade"	Next → "Coda"
- Star Trek: Voyager season 3

"Alter Ego" is the 56th episode of the science fiction television series Star Trek: Voyager, the 14th episode of the third season. It was directed by cast member Robert Picardo ("The Doctor"). The episode aired on UPN on January 15, 1997.

In this episode, entanglements ensue after Ensign Kim asks Tuvok for help "falling out of love" with a holographic character who in turn falls for the Vulcan, leaving Kim jealous. Meanwhile, USS Voyager encounters a beautiful but mysterious nebula.

== Plot ==
The Federation starship Voyager is engaged in exploring a nebula inversion that is mysteriously stable. While inversion nebulae normally burn out after a few years, this one appears to have existed for centuries. While the rest of the crew discuss emotions with the Vulcan tactical officer Tuvok, Ensign Harry Kim gives him a discomforted look. Kim later visits Tuvok in his quarters, and asks Tuvok to teach him the Vulcan way of suppressing his emotions. When Tuvok asks why, Kim reveals that he has fallen in love with a character from the holodeck. As a part of Tuvok's methods, they go to see this character, Marayna. Meanwhile, Captain Janeway orders the ship to move away from the inversion, but the ship fails to respond.

All of the crew later engages in a luau on the holodeck. Tuvok again meets Marayna, and is intrigued by her logic. Harry sees this and becomes jealous of Tuvok, who assures him that his jealousy is misplaced and that he feels no emotions for Marayna, but Harry will not listen to this. To prove his statement Tuvok deletes the Marayna character from the holodeck.

Later as Tuvok enters his quarters, he finds Marayna there, wearing the Doctor's mobile emitter. Marayna, hence, reveals herself to be a sentient being who can escape the confines of the holodeck—and is no ordinary holodeck character. It appears she has uploaded herself into the computer. Tuvok then informs security as Marayna disappears. Her attempt here to capture Tuvok's love fails, however, since the Vulcan Tuvok is not receptive to her "suggestions" that they see each other more often. Angry and disappointed at being rebuffed by Tuvok, Marayna has now taken control of Voyager's computer and disabled her engines—a situation which could spell disaster for Voyager in the middle of a nebula. This is particularly true as activity in the nebula suddenly increases, threatening the ship. Captain Janeway is alerted to the matter with Marayna and she and Tuvok begin scanning Voyager's immediate vicinity for hidden vessels and eventually find a spot from where the real Marayna character originates.

Tuvok beams himself to this location aboard Marayna's ship and meets the real Marayna, an alien who is living totally alone and isolated in the nebula inversion to prevent it from igniting in order to allow her people to enjoy its beauty. However, she was so fascinated by the Voyager's holodeck program that her curiosity led her to hack into Voyager's computer, and she was intrigued by Tuvok. She asks Tuvok to remain with her but Tuvok reveals that he is already married and has children on Vulcan. Tuvok tells Marayna that if she really cares about him she must let him and the ship pass through the nebula safely. Tuvok also explains that if he stayed with her merely to save the ship, the relationship between Marayna and him would not be what Marayna desires—one of equal partners. Marayna sees the logic of Tuvok's suggestion, and permits Voyager to safely continue its journey home through the nebula inversion.

== Home media ==
This episode was released on DVD on July 6, 2004, as part of Star Trek Voyager: Complete Third Season, with Dolby 5.1 surround audio. The season 3 DVD was released in the UK on September 6, 2004. In 2017, the complete Star Trek: Voyager television series was released in a DVD box set, which included it as part of the season 3 discs.
