= Persistence of Vision (Star Trek: Voyager) =

- Star Trek: Voyager episode
- Episode no.: Season 2 Episode 8
- Directed by: James L. Conway
- Written by: Jeri Taylor
- Production code: 124
- Original air date: October 30, 1995

Guest appearances
- Patrick Kerr - Telepathic Botha; Stan Ivar - Mark; Michael Cumpsty - Lord Burleigh; Thomas Dekker - Henry Burleigh; Lindsey Haun - Beatrice Burleigh; Carolyn Seymour - Mrs. Templeton; Warren Munson - Admiral Paris; Marva Hicks - T'Pel

Episode chronology
← Previous "Parturition"	Next → "Tattoo"
- Star Trek: Voyager season 2

"Persistence of Vision" is the 24th episode of Star Trek: Voyager, the eighth episode in the second season. This science fiction television episode, part of the Star Trek franchise, is several hundred years in the future in Earth's galaxy. A Federation starship is stranded on the other side of the Galaxy, and its warp drive will take decades to return. In this episode, the ship's captain is revealed to be quite stressed and takes some to time to relax in the holodeck. But her experience, in a way typical of this franchise, explores illusion and reality aboard a spaceship encountering unknown aliens.

The episode aired on UPN on October 30, 1995.

== Plot ==
As Voyager readies for a potentially dangerous encounter with the Botha, the Doctor orders an exhausted Captain Janeway to relax in the holodeck. Before long, she is called back to the Bridge for first contact with the Botha. The Botha representative gives the crew a chilly reception, but sets up a rendezvous to determine whether or not they will allow Voyager to pass through their space. Janeway starts seeing characters and objects from her holonovel, a story in the fashion of Jane Eyre.

Janeway goes to sick-bay, but The Doctor cannot find anything wrong with her brain. Janeway experiences another hallucination, which Kes sees, too. The hallucination bounces off of her and reflects back into Janeway. The Doctor orders Janeway to her quarters for rest until he can determine the source of these events. Later, another holonovel character attacks her in her quarters with a knife. Again, Kes confirms the event, but it is a hallucination—Janeway is still in sick-bay.

Janeway puts Chakotay in charge of meeting with the Botha while she undergoes medical testing. The representative's ship engages the crew in a battle, damaging Voyager. Janeway races to the Bridge, where the Bothan is on the viewscreen, but is shocked to see her fiancee Mark. The other crew members similarly see their loved ones on the screen, and they begin experiencing hallucinations and entering a catatonic state one-by-one, with only Kes and the Doctor remaining unaffected. Kes heads for engineering to block the psychic field; on her way she hallucinates Tom Paris in the corridor with plasma burns on his face, but soon realizes he is not real. While in Engineering, the Doctor guides her through the process to create a modified warp field that will disable the alien energy wave. Neelix soon enters and tries to get her to stop the process. She starts hallucinating burns on her body but she soon focuses herself and defeats the hallucination of Neelix by reflecting the burns back upon the intruder that make him incapacitated by his own redirected power, while Kes manages to restore the crew to normal by activating the warp field.

A telepathic Botha confesses to having caused the disturbance, simply because he could. Before they can confront him further, he disappears. As they continue on their way, the crew reflects uneasily about what is lurking in the subconscious corridors of their minds.

== Casting ==
This episode includes several holographic characters, including reoccurring child characters Beatrice and Henry.

== Reception ==
When broadcast in 1995, "Persistence of Vision" received a Nielsen rating of 6.1 points.
