= Blood Fever (disambiguation) =

Blood Fever is the second novel in the Young Bond book series by Charlie Higson

Blood Fever may also refer to:

- Bloodfever, the second novel in the Darkfever book series
- "Blood Fever" (Star Trek: Voyager), an episode of Star Trek: Voyager
- Blood Fever, a working title for the 1995 film Mosquito
- (archaic) May refer to sepsis.
