= Parturition (Star Trek: Voyager) =

- Star Trek: Voyager episode
- Episode no.: Season 2 Episode 7
- Directed by: Jonathan Frakes
- Written by: Thomas E. Szollosi
- Cinematography by: Marvin V. Rush
- Production code: 123
- Original air date: October 9, 1995

Guest appearance
- Majel Barrett - Computer Voice

Episode chronology
| ← Previous "Twisted" | Next → "Persistence of Vision" |
- Star Trek: Voyager season 2

"Parturition" is the 23rd episode of the American science fiction television series Star Trek: Voyager. It is the seventh episode of the second season and is the second of three Voyager episodes directed by Star Trek: The Next Generation castmember Jonathan Frakes (William Riker).

The series follows the adventures of the Federation starship Voyager during its journey home to Earth, having been stranded tens of thousands of light-years away. In this episode, Neelix and Paris have a personal falling out, after which they are sent on an away mission together, where they must reconcile their disagreements with each other to help keep a newly hatched alien infant alive.

The episode aired on UPN on October 30, 1995.

== Plot ==
Relations between Neelix and Lt. Tom Paris fall to a new low when they have a fight in the mess hall over Kes. Captain Janeway calls them to her ready room for an assignment. Janeway cautions them to put their differences aside. Voyager's food supplies are low, and scans of a nearby planet have detected proteins. Due to Neelix's role as chef, and Paris's position as the ship's most experienced pilot, they are sent to the planet, which they call "Planet Hell", to scout for edible material. On their way to the planet, their shuttle crashes because of environmental interference.

The planet is coated in a poisonous trigemic vapor that forces Paris and Neelix to seek shelter. They find a cave and blast the rock to cover the entrance, assuming that they will be rescued before long. They discover a nest of eggs, and as one hatches, they debate what to do, with Paris wanting to leave the hatchling and Neelix believing that they have a responsibility to care for it. Voyager is attacked by an alien ship, which places itself between Voyager and the planet in an attempt to block access to the surface.

Paris and Neelix discuss their argument over Kes. Paris confesses that he is attracted to her but that he respects her choice to be with Neelix. The two care for the creature, but before long it appears to be dying. It will not eat their rations, but they surmise that the vapor outside must be the source of the protein they saw in their scans, but the stone they blasted in front of the entrance has prevented the hatchling from feeding. Once they bring the creature outside and force-feed the vapors to it by a medicine dropper, the creature recovers. Paris and Neelix are overjoyed, though they exhibit symptoms from the trigemic poisons. Voyager disables the weapons aboard the enemy ship and moves into the planet's atmosphere to rescue Neelix and Tom. They refuse to be transported off until they are sure that the creature will survive. They hide and beam away only when an adult of the creature's species collects the infant.

Back aboard Voyager, Kes, who is glad to see Neelix's return, observes that Paris and Neelix have formed a friendship based on respect.

== Production ==
"Parturition" was written with the specific goal of resolving Neelix and Paris's animosity and dealing with Neelix's jealousy over Kes once and for all. Executive Producer Jeri Taylor stated, "...we wanted to create the feeling of a family, not a lot of people with resentments. So we were looking for a way for Paris and Neelix to resolve their differences, and this plot worked out very nicely." Jennifer Lien, who portrayed Kes, was similarly positive about the change in her relationship with Neelix after this episode. She stated, "I think Kes and Neelix still need to explore some issues of trust. I think Neelix's jealousy is getting to be minimal because the character is learning. They've grown in this relationship. When it becomes too obsessive, it becomes scary, and I don't think that's what the character of Neelix is about." The infant creature which appears in this episode was a cable-operated puppet. Ethan Phillips said, "It took six guys to operate that (puppet). Six guys and two girls, they were an eight-man team. There were all kinds of wires and levers and prods. It was very complicated, but it was very realistic." The set was the same cave set that has been used in multiple Star Trek episodes since The Next Generation.

== Reception ==
It had Nielsen ratings of 5.9 when it was broadcast on TV in 1995. Doux Reviews noted the focus on the character Tom Paris as a positive and the destruction of another Voyager starship shuttle.

Den of Geek included this episode on a binge-watching guide that included a roadmap of episodes that, although not typically achieving high ratings, were still entertaining.

== See also ==
- "Final Mission" (Next Generation episode with characters stranded after shuttle accident)
