= Fair Trade (Star Trek: Voyager) =

- Star Trek: Voyager episode
- Episode no.: Season 3 Episode 13
- Directed by: Jesús Salvador Treviño
- Story by: Ronald Wilkerson; Jean Louise Matthias
- Teleplay by: André Bormanis
- Production code: 156
- Original air date: January 8, 1997

Guest appearances
- James Nardini - Wixiban; Carlos Carrasco - Bahrat; Alexander Enberg - Vorik; Steve Kehela - Sutok; James Horan - Tosin

Episode chronology
← Previous "Macrocosm"	Next → "Alter Ego"
- Star Trek: Voyager season 3

"Fair Trade" is the 55th episode of Star Trek: Voyager, the 13th episode of the third season. The Federation starship USS Voyager has reached a trade outpost station at the edge of a new region of space. Neelix, a Delta quadrant native that has been working as a guide and liaison for the spaceship, is concerned he has outlived his usefulness aboard the ship because the new region is as far as he has traveled.

This television episode was aired on UPN on January 8, 1997.

The episode won one Emmy award.

== Plot ==
Voyager encounters a region of space known as the "Nekrit Expanse". Neelix is unfamiliar with the space beyond, which causes him to worry that he will be of no more use as a guide. Voyager docks at a nearby space station to take on supplies and information, where Neelix meets an old Talaxian friend called Wixiban. Neelix offers to help Wixiban retrieve medical supplies in exchange for a map of the Expanse. However, the trade actually involves illegal narcotics. The trader reneges on the deal and attempts to kill them once he receives the goods, but Wixiban shoots and kills the trader. The Talaxians both escape undetected, but Neelix is furious.

Bahrat, the owner of the space station, investigates the incident and discovers that the murder weapon was a phaser from Voyager. Neelix and Wixiban are questioned by Tuvok; Wixiban denies any knowledge of the incident. When Tuvok leaves, Wixiban explains that the drug trade was not his scheme, but he was simply working as an agent to pay off debts he owed to the Kolaati, a ruthless group of drug dealers. He asks Neelix to steal a sample of Voyager's warp plasma for the Kolaati, reminding him that Voyager is prepared to abandon him.

While on Voyager, Neelix comes across Tom Paris and asks about how he ended up in prison before joining the crew, and Tom explains that it was because he was dishonest and it cost him dearly. Just as Neelix is about to extract a sample of warp plasma, he backs off and goes to Wixiban, insisting that they must tell the truth. Moments later, Bahrat arrives and arrests Tom Paris and Chakotay, accusing them of the murder as they were seen on surveillance talking to the killed trader. Neelix and Wixiban go to Bahrat and confess to the crime, but offer to expose the Kolaati if Bahrat does not charge them. A set-up is arranged but ultimately goes wrong, resulting in an explosion.

Neelix wakes up in sick bay. He learns that the charges have been dropped, the Kolaati have been arrested, and Wixiban was able to leave. Captain Janeway confronts him and harshly chastises him for his actions, but adds that he is more than just a crewman, but is part of a family. She puts him on punishment duty, but he is immensely relieved.

== Production ==
A break-up scene between Neelix and Kes was filmed for the episode, but was ultimately cut due to time constraints.

== Reception ==
In 2021, The Digital Fix felt this was an attempt to develop the character of Neelix, who they said has a "crisis of purpose" in the wilds of the Delta quadrant.

== Awards ==
This episode won an Emmy award for Outstanding Hairstyling for a Series.

== Citations ==
- Robinson, Ben; Wright, Mark (2020). Star Trek: Voyager – A Celebration. Hero Collector. ISBN 9781858756141.
- Ruditis, Paul (2003). Star Trek Voyager Companion. Pocket Books. ISBN 9780743417518 – via Google Books.
