= Twisted (Star Trek: Voyager) =

- Star Trek: Voyager episode
- Episode no.: Season 2 Episode 6
- Directed by: Kim Friedman
- Story by: Arnold Rudnick; Rich Hosek
- Teleplay by: Kenneth Biller
- Production code: 119
- Original air date: October 2, 1995

Guest appearances
- Larry Hankin - Gaunt Gary; Judy Geeson - Sandrine; Tom Virtue - Walter Baxter; Terry Correll - Crewman

Episode chronology
← Previous "Non Sequitur"	Next → "Parturition"
- Star Trek: Voyager season 2

"Twisted" is the 22nd episode of Star Trek: Voyager, the sixth episode in the second season. Set in the 24th century, the Starfleet ship U.S.S. Voyager is stranded in the Delta Quadrant on the opposite side of the Galaxy from Earth in the Alpha Quadrant. In this episode, a spatial anomaly distorts the ship and the crew must work through their relationships amidst difficult and constantly changing surroundings.

The episode aired on UPN on October 2, 1995.

== Plot ==
Voyager encounters a strange energy field during a surprise party on the holodeck for Kes's second birthday. Many members of the crew are at the party, including Captain Janeway and The Doctor. Eventually, the ship becomes stuck in the field, causing the internal communications system on board Voyager to fail. Unable to communicate with Tuvok, who is acting captain during the party, the crew attempt to return to their posts. However, the ship's layout has mysteriously changed and they are unable to find their way. The crew eventually become separated and hopelessly lost within the labyrinthine corridors. Meanwhile, The Doctor becomes unable to return himself to sickbay and finds himself amorously pursued by the hologram Sandrine, while Neelix once more becomes jealous of Tom Paris's relationship with Kes.

The crew, including Tuvok, who has left the bridge and become similarly lost, all find themselves back at the holodeck. They organize themselves in an attempt to reach crucial areas of the ship such as engineering and the bridge; B'Elanna and Paris are successful in reaching engineering, but when they try to transport to the bridge they find themselves back at the holodeck. Meanwhile, Janeway becomes delirious after coming into direct contact with the energy field, which is penetrating further into the ship, and is brought to the holodeck by Harry Kim in the hope that The Doctor can help her.

B'Elanna returns to Engineering and makes an attempt to stop the field with a ship-wide energy burst, but this only makes the field envelop the ship at an accelerated rate. With the holodeck as the last refuge, the crew gathers there, and Tuvok suggests that the most logical course of action is to simply do nothing, as any attempt to stop it has only made the situation worse, and they so far have no evidence that being engulfed by the field is fatal. They do as Tuvok suggests and neither the crew nor the ship is harmed by passing through the field. Janeway is returned to health and surmises that the energy field was somehow sentient and trying to communicate with them – her theory is backed by the fact that the ship's entire memory has been downloaded and that 20 million gigaquads of data have been uploaded to Voyager's computer.

== Production ==
"Twisted" was extensively rewritten prior to being shot, and was for a time rumored to be so bad that it would never be aired, based largely on comments that Robert Picardo made at several fan conventions. The episode originally underran its time significantly, and several scenes had to be invented to extend its length, most significantly the subplot involving The Doctor being pursued by Sandrine. Script writer Michael Piller went on to voice criticisms about Neelix's subplot in this episode; he felt that the character should not be constantly portrayed as a 'buffoon', and attempting to correct the issues that he saw and resolve the subplot in question with the following episode, "Parturition". Reviewers Lance Parkin and Mark Jones complained that the massive data deposit of 20 million gigaquads was never explained or referred to again, leading to frustration as to why it was ever mentioned in the first place.

== Reception ==
TV.com lists "Twisted" with a rating of 7.9/10 as of 2018, based on 179 votes. It had a Nielsen rating of 5.6 points when it was broadcast in 1995.

A 1995 newspaper fan-vote nominated this episode as the worst of Star Trek: Voyager up to that time.

A Den of Geek binge-watching guide included "Twisted" in a roadmap of episodes, that although not typically achieving high ratings, were still entertaining.

== See also ==
- List of Star Trek: Voyager episodes
- ""—And He Built a Crooked House—"", Robert A. Heinlein short story in which a house becomes four-dimensional as a result of an earthquake, with effects similar to this episode.
