= Tattoo (Star Trek: Voyager) =

- Star Trek: Voyager episode
- Episode no.: Season 2 Episode 9
- Directed by: Alexander Singer
- Story by: Larry Brody
- Teleplay by: Michael Piller
- Cinematography by: Marvin V. Rush
- Production code: 125
- Original air date: November 6, 1995

Guest appearances
- Henry Darrow - Kolopak; Richard Fancy - Alien; Douglas Spain - Young Chakotay; Nancy Hower - Ensign Samantha Wildman; Richard Chaves - Chief; Kaiyoti - Native Scout; Joseph Palmas - Antonio

Episode chronology
← Previous "Persistence of Vision"	Next → "Cold Fire"
- Star Trek: Voyager season 2

"Tattoo" is the 25th episode of the American science fiction television series Star Trek: Voyager, the ninth episode of the second season.

Set in the 24th century, the series follows the adventures of the Starfleet and Maquis crew of the starship USS Voyager after they were stranded in the Delta Quadrant far from the rest of the Federation. In this episode, Voyager investigates possible sources of a material it needs to continue on its journey home and Chakotay (Robert Beltran) mysteriously finds a symbol known to his family's Native American tribe back on Earth.

This television episode guest stars actor Douglas Spain as a young Chakotay, as well as several other guest stars for the flashback sequences and exoplanet inhabitants. Back on Voyager, the Doctor hologram explores human illness to be a better doctor.

The episode aired on UPN on November 6, 1995.

== Plot ==
Leading an away team to an uninhabited moon, Chakotay (Robert Beltran) comes across a familiar symbol drawn on the ground. He has a flashback and remembers seeing a similar symbol drawn by his Native American tribe on Earth when he was a young boy (Douglas Spain). Tuvok (Tim Russ) attempts to question him about it, but he is reluctant to discuss it with him. He tells Captain Janeway (Kate Mulgrew) about his discovery, though, and the two of them find a warp trail leading away from the moon to a planet. They decide to investigate, both to pursue the mystery of the symbol and because the planet contains useful minerals.

Efforts to reach the planet are inexplicably hindered. Isolated storms form instantly when the crew tries to beam down by transporter, and when they take a shuttlecraft, more intense storms develop, making approach difficult. When they finally touch down, Neelix (Ethan Phillips) is attacked by a hawk and must be transported back to the ship. Chakotay has further flashbacks, and remembers hiking through a rain forest on Earth with his father (Henry Darrow) in an attempt to locate their ancestral tribe. As a teenager, he had been unreceptive to the experience, telling his father that their heritage was unimportant and that they should embrace the 24th century rather than focusing on their past. The Voyager away team discovers structures similar to those that Chakotay and his father discovered on their journey.

Chakotay believes that they are being watched by the local inhabitants, and orders the away team to lay down their weapons, to make it clear that they are not a threat. He recalls his father doing the same thing, upon which the Rubber Tree People his father was seeking emerged from the forest. A storm appears from nowhere, and the crew are forced to beam back to Voyager. Chakotay loses his comm badge and is trapped on the surface. He dons some native clothes that he finds on the ground and goes searching for the inhabitants of the planet. Meanwhile, Captain Janeway decides to land Voyager to search for their missing commander. As with the shuttlecraft, a storm forms as they begin their landing sequence. The storm quickly grows to cyclone strength, setting Voyager on an uncontrollable crash course.

On the planet, Chakotay slips through a lightning barrier to enter a cave for shelter and is confronted by the local population. They bear the same tattoo as Chakotay, who explains that he wears it in honor of his father as his father did before him. The locals describe how they gave a gift to Chakotay's ancestors to protect and care for the planet, but believed them to have been eradicated by other humans. Thus, the "sky spirits" believed Voyager's true intentions were to seek out and destroy them and had been responsible for the various storms encountered. Chakotay convinces them that humans have learned from their mistakes and truly came in peace. They dissipate the storm around Voyager mere seconds before the ship would have crashed onto the planet. For the first time in his life, Chakotay feels a connection to his people.

In a minor sub-plot, The Doctor (Robert Picardo) wants to prove to the crew that mild illnesses do not have to inhibit work. He programs a simulated flu for himself as to act as an example to the rest of the crew. However, Kes (Jennifer Lien) programs it to last longer than he is expecting, in order to prove to him that people who are sick deserve sympathy, and he becomes a terrible patient, begging for the rest of the crew to look after him.

== Production ==
After the initial concept of "Tattoo" was purchased by the writing team, they struggled for a long time to make it work, and it was abandoned for a time. When writer Michael Piller resurrected it, he used the script to make a point to the rest of the writers about pacing: "'Tattoo' was written in sort of a rage ... right in the middle of my battle about pace. I set out to prove that there was a way to tell stories without writing long scenes and I turned in a script that had 190 or 200 scenes. Look at all the levels you're dealing with–flashbacks, a mystery, a culture and an issue of history–there are so many things going on."

The storyline in which The Doctor becomes intentionally unwell was suggested by the actor who plays him, Robert Picardo. He stated "I pitched that idea first to Jeri Taylor and then to Michael Piller. Not having any interest in writing myself, I was doing it just because I thought it might be a fun thing to act ... Michael took that kernel of an idea, and created a great 'B' story, and was very appreciative of my suggestion."

The hawk which attacked Neelix created issues, as the episode was shot on location. Property master Alan Sims recalled that "the hawk spotted a crow and went off after it in the opposite direction. It took hours to find him. The delay was a nightmare."

== Reception ==
Robert Beltran, the actor who portrays Chakotay, was very pleased with the episode. He stated that "it was a very personal episode (which) I related to on a couple of different levels. For example, in the episode, Chakotay says, 'I don't understand the ancient language of my people,' and my Spanish is passable but I'm always revealing that I'm not yet able to participate fully in conversation with my own people. So a lot of elements of that story resonated very strongly with me."

"Tattoo" is listed with a rating of 6.8/10 on TV.com as of 2018. The episode was first broadcast on November 6, 1995 and it received a Nielsen rating of 5.8 points.
