= Gary Bullock =

American actor (1941–2022)

Gary Bullock (July 19, 1941 – April 11, 2022) was an American actor and author.

== Career ==
Bullock appeared in such films as RoboCop 2, Twin Peaks: Fire Walk with Me, RoboCop 3, Species and Racing Stripes and appeared on such television series as In the Heat of the Night, Roseanne, NYPD Blue, Star Trek: Voyager, The X-Files and Star Trek: Enterprise. He was married to actress Mil Nicholson and wrote a romantic science-fiction novel titled Elsewhen.

== Personal life ==
Bullock died on April 11, 2022, at the age of 80.

== Filmography ==
=== Film ===
| Year | Title | Role | Notes |
|---|---|---|---|
| 1989 | Winter People | Mr. McGregor | |
| 1989 | Chattahoochee | Sadistic Attendant | |
| 1990 | The Handmaid's Tale | Officer on Bus | |
| 1990 | RoboCop 2 | Hack Doctor | |
| 1991 | Paris Trout | Buster Devonne | |
| 1992 | Love Crimes | Joey | |
| 1992 | Twin Peaks: Fire Walk with Me | Sheriff Cable | |
| 1993 | RoboCop 3 | Gas Station Clerk | |
| 1994 | Clean Slate | Bailiff | |
| 1994 | Blue Sky | Doctor Vankay | |
| 1994 | Terminal Velocity | Lex | |
| 1995 | Species | Motel Clerk | |
| 1995 | Rage | Dr. Andrews | |
| 1996 | Tiger Heart | Brad's Father | |
| 1998 | Sweet Jane | Figure | |
| 1998 | Children of the Corn V: Fields of Terror | Farmer | |
| 1999 | Children of the Corn 666: Isaac's Return | Zachariah | |
| 2001 | My First Mister | Mr. Smithman | |
| 2001 | Bubble Boy | Perris Sheriff | |
| 2002 | Wishcraft | Homeless Man | |
| 2003 | Holes | Prospector | |
| 2003 | The Kiss | Donald Kellermen | |
| 2005 | Racing Stripes | John Cooper | |
| 2005 | The Curse of El Charro | Prugatory Bartender | |
| 2014 | Twin Peaks: The Missing Pieces | Sheriff Cable | |

=== Television ===
| Year | Title | Role | Notes |
|---|---|---|---|
| 1989 | In the Heat of the Night | Man #1 | Episode: "Stranger in Town" |
| 1989 | Desperate for Love | Mac | Television film |
| 1991 | In the Line of Duty: Manhunt in the Dakotas | Jury Foreman | Television film |
| 1992 | Roseanne | Ghost of Hallowe'en Future | Episode: "Halloween IV" |
| 1993 | NYPD Blue | Frank Archer | Episode: "True Confessions" |
| 1994 | Roswell | Eavesdropper | Television film |
| 1995 | Sisters | Grim Reaper | Episode: "Angel of Death" |
| 1995, 1996 | The Jeff Foxworthy Show | Hearse driver | 2 episodes |
| 1996 | Weird Science | Abraham Lincoln | Episode: "Community Property" |
| 1997 | Men Behaving Badly | Man in Waiting Room / Freak | 2 episodes |
| 1997 | Star Trek: Voyager | Goth | Episode: "Rise" |
| 1997 | Murder, She Wrote: South by Southwest | Phipps | Television film |
| 1997, 1998 | Teen Angel | Abraham Lincoln | 2 episodes |
| 1998 | Beyond Belief: Fact or Fiction | Butler | 2 episodes |
| 1998 | Ally McBeal | Judge Kenneth Steele | Episode: "Forbidden Fruits" |
| 1998 | Poodle Springs | L.A. Captain | Television film |
| 1999 | Buffy the Vampire Slayer | Shrouded Man | Episode: "Enemies" |
| 1999 | Providence | Harold Diller | Episode: "Family Tree" |
| 2000 | The X-Files | Tall George | Episode: "Patience" |
| 2002, 2003 | Sabrina the Teenage Witch | Abraham Lincoln | 2 episodes |
| 2003 | Star Trek: Enterprise | Klingon Council Member | Episode: "The Expanse" |
| 2005 | The Shield | Husband | Episode: "Tar Baby" |
| 2017 | The Exorcist | Agent #2 | Episode: "Ritual & Repetition" |
