= Coda (Star Trek: Voyager) =

- Star Trek: Voyager episode
- Episode no.: Season 3 Episode 15
- Directed by: Nancy Malone
- Written by: Jeri Taylor
- Production code: 158
- Original air date: January 29, 1997

Guest appearance
- Len Cariou - Admiral Janeway

Episode chronology
← Previous "Alter Ego"	Next → "Blood Fever"
- Star Trek: Voyager season 3

"Coda" is the 57th episode of Star Trek: Voyager, the 15th episode of the third season. This science fiction television show episode focuses on the characters Janeway and Chakotay of the Federation spacecraft USS Voyager. In the 24th century, Captain Janeway and Chakotay are traveling by shuttlecraft back to USS Voyager when they have an incident involving the Vidiians.

This episode was written by Jeri Taylor and directed by Nancy Malone, it aired on UPN on January 29, 1997.

== Plot ==
Janeway and Chakotay are travelling back to Voyager on a shuttlecraft when they are forced down by electrical interference from a nearby planet. Janeway is critically injured in the crash and has to be revived by Chakotay via CPR and cordrazine. Janeway activates their homing signal and then realizes that this shows the Vidiians (whom Chakotay discovers have shot them down) right where to find them. She tries to disable it, but the Vidiians already landed. They are then captured and killed by the Vidiians (Chakotay is shot, Janeway is strangled).

Janeway finds herself back on the shuttle; she and Chakotay have a vague awareness that all is not right. They track a Vidiian warship on an intercept course and are determined not to make the same mistakes as before. After a brief battle, their shuttle's warp core destabilizes and it explodes. Janeway and Chakotay are right where they started again; in the shuttle. Then they once again see Vidiians - this time two ships - on an intercept course, and when they take steps in an attempt to escape the apparent time loop, the Vidiian ships suddenly disappear. They are contacted by Voyager and brought back safe and sound. However Janeway begins to show signs of disorientation.

The Doctor informs Janeway that she has been infected by a virulent strain of the Vidiian phage; to her horror, the Doctor then euthanizes her with nerve gas. Then, once more Janeway and Chakotay are back on the shuttle. They see a strange bright light in front of them that is coming towards their shuttle; suddenly it engulfs them. Next, Janeway finds herself in an out-of-body experience. She sees Chakotay trying, unsuccessfully, to revive her. Crew members arrive and transport her straight to sickbay, and her "spirit" follows, trying unsuccessfully to contact the crew. The Doctor and Kes get some signs of life, but ultimately, Janeway dies.

Janeway is next encountered by the "spirit" of her "father," who is there to transfer her to the "next world." He allows her to stay for her funeral. Something about the whole thing does not seem right to her. Soon after her memorial service, at which B'Elanna Torres and Harry Kim each make a heartfelt statement about her, she stalls going with her "father" so she can figure out what is going on.

Suddenly, she sees a vision of her looking up at Chakotay and the Doctor, still on the surface of the planet, as if they are still trying to revive her. A second and third vision make it obvious this is all a ruse, and her "father" is really a non-corporeal being trying to coax her spirit away from her body so he can feed off it. She refuses to go, and they are successful in finally reviving her. She makes a full recovery on Voyager. Janeway invites Chakotay on a holo-date to celebrate her return to life, and he accepts.

== Reception ==
In 2018, TheGamer ranked this first out of the top 25 creepiest episodes of all Star Trek series. In 2019, Janeway's actions in this episode were ranked as one of her top five best moments as Captain by Screen Rant. They commend her for being so devoted to her crew, that despite some character issues it demonstrates how she loves her crew, and they reciprocate. It is this loyalty and stubbornness that saves her from getting trapped by a quasi-spiritualistic alien being featured in this episode. They noted that this episode touches upon a common Star Trek theme of spirituality gone wrong, but highlighted the demonstration of the crew of Janeway's character.

In 2020, Den of Geek ranked this episode as the 10th scariest episode in the Star Trek franchise.

Tor.com gave this 5 out of 10, and praised the casting of Len Cariou as Janeway's father. They note episode writer Jeri Taylor expanded on Janeway's family in the novel Mosaic.

== Media releases ==
This episode was released on DVD on July 6, 2004, as part of Star Trek Voyager: Complete Third Season, with Dolby 5.1 surround audio. The season 3 DVD was released in the UK on September 6, 2004.

In 2017, the complete Star Trek: Voyager television series was released in a DVD box set, which included it as part of the season 3 discs.
