= Darkling (Star Trek: Voyager) =

- Star Trek: Voyager episode
- Episode no.: Season 3 Episode 18
- Directed by: Alexander Singer
- Story by: Brannon Braga; Joe Menosky
- Teleplay by: Joe Menosky
- Production code: 161
- Original air date: February 19, 1997

Guest appearances
- David Lee Smith - Zahir; Stephen Davies - Nakahn; Noel de Souza - Gandhi; Christopher Clarke - Lord Byron; Sue Henley - Ens. Brooks

Episode chronology
← Previous "Unity"	Next → "Rise"
- Star Trek: Voyager season 3

"Darkling" is the 60th episode of Star Trek: Voyager, the 18th episode of the third season. This episode focuses mostly on the events which result when the holographic Doctor (a self-aware computer program) aboard the starship USS Voyager tries to enhance himself by adding personality traits from other people into his programming.

The episode debuted on UPN on February 19, 1997.

== Plot ==
While Kes pursues a romantic interest, the Doctor attempts to improve his program by including elements of the personalities of famous people he admires; as taken from holocharacters of them.

As it turns out, the darker, less well-known sides of these people's personalities form a second, evil personality within the doctor.

This evil version of the Doctor takes over and attempts to murder an alien from the planet which Voyager is currently visiting, by pushing the alien off a cliff.

The evil twin also temporarily paralyzes Lt. Torres when she discovers his existence.

At the episode's climax, the evil version of the doctor jumps off a cliff with Kes but they get beamed back to Voyager while falling. Upon returning to the ship, the Doctor's program is restored to normal.

Summarily, just before the end credits, the Doctor is heard reciting part of the Hippocratic Oath (the medical professional's pledge) which begins with the solemn promise to "do no harm."

== Reception ==
In 2017 this episode was noted as featuring scary or eerie Star Trek content. In 2018, TheGamer ranked this one of the top 25 creepiest episodes of all Star Trek series. They note a series of disturbing behaviors by the EMH program in this episode, and were disappointed that many of the program's malfunctions were not addressed.

== Media releases ==
This episode was released on DVD on July 6, 2004, as part of Star Trek Voyager: Complete Third Season, with Dolby 5.1 surround audio. The season 3 DVD was released in the UK on September 6, 2004.

In 2017, the complete Star Trek: Voyager television series was released in a DVD box set, which included it as part of the season 3 discs.
