= Alexander Enberg =

American actor (born 1972)

- Born: April 5, 1972 (age 52)
- Parents: Dick Enberg (father); Jeri Taylor (mother)

Alexander Enberg (born April 5, 1972) is an American actor. He is sometimes credited as Alex Enberg.

== Biography ==
Enberg is the son of television screenwriter and producer Jeri Taylor and sportscaster Dick Enberg.

== Career ==
=== Actor ===
Enberg has played young Vulcan engineers on two Star Trek series: Taurik on Star Trek: The Next Generation (TNG) and Vorik on Star Trek: Voyager. He also played the reporter on the TNG episode "Time's Arrow", and the non-canon Crewman Austin Chang in Star Trek: Voyager – Elite Force and Star Trek: Elite Force II. He guest starred in the episode "I’ve Got A Crush On You" of Lois & Clark.

In 2007, Enberg played the role of Jason, the crazy theater director, in the independent feature film, Never Say Macbeth.

=== Special effects designer ===
In 2006, Enberg designed the special effects for a short film, Fartman: Caught in a Tight Ass, which aired on Howard TV, Howard Stern's iN Demand Cable Channel, and can now be seen on Atom Films.

In 2007, Enberg also designed the special effects for Never Say Macbeth.
