= Chakotay =

Character from Star Trek: Voyager

- Star Trek character
- Promotional image of Robert Beltran as Chakotay in Star Trek: Voyager
- First appearance: "Caretaker" (1995)
- Portrayed by: Robert Beltran; Douglas Spain (as a youth)

In-universe information
- Species: Human
- Affiliation: Maquis; Starfleet
- Posting: Commanding Officer, USS Protostar (PRO); First officer, USS Voyager (VOY) (Federation)
- Rank: Starfleet Captain (PRO); Starfleet Commissioned Lieutenant Commander; Field Commissioned Provisional Commander (VOY); Captain of Maquis Raider Val Jean

Chakotay /tʃəˈkoʊteɪ/ is a fictional character who appears in each of the seven seasons of the American science fiction television series Star Trek: Voyager. Portrayed by Robert Beltran, he was First Officer aboard the Starfleet starship USS Voyager, and later promoted to captain in command of the USS Protostar in Star Trek: Prodigy. The character was suggested at an early stage of the development of the series. He is the first Native American main character in the Star Trek franchise. This was a deliberate move by the producers of the series, who sought to inspire minorities – specifically Native Americans – as was intended with Uhura in Star Trek: The Original Series for African Americans. To develop the character, the producers sought the assistance of Jamake Highwater, who falsely claimed to be Native American. Despite first being named by producers as Sioux, and later Hopi, Chakotay was given no tribal affiliation at the start of the series, and eventually was assigned ancestry with a fictional tribe in the episode "Tattoo”. It wasn't until his appearance in Star Trek: Prodigy that he was formally identified as a descendant of the Nicarao people of Central America.

The character first appeared in the pilot episode of the series, "Caretaker". Chakotay continued to appear throughout the series in a main cast role, with his final appearance in the finale, "Endgame". He was featured in an ongoing storyline throughout the first and second seasons, which featured the betrayal of his former lover Seska (Martha Hackett) until her death in "Basics". Following his experience with disconnected Borg in "Unity", Chakotay was against an alliance with the Borg in "Scorpion", nearly leading to the death of Seven of Nine (Jeri Ryan). Despite this, by the end of the series, the two characters were in a romantic relationship. In the Voyager relaunch novels set after the vessel's return to the Alpha Quadrant, Chakotay is promoted to captain of the ship, but the relationship with Seven has ended.

Reviewers of Chakotay were critical of the stereotypical nature of Chakotay's Native American heritage. This led to comparisons with Tonto from The Lone Ranger, and that the inclusion of "Hollywood" versions of vision quests and meditation techniques were contrary to the character's in-universe tribal background. However, he was praised as a role model for Native American science fiction and called "ground-breaking", as well as the most prominent example of a Native American character within this genre.

== Concept and development ==
As a leader, he is steady, fearless, and capable of inspiring absolute devotion. Though he comes onto Voyager more by necessity than choice, he quickly wins the respect of even the most die-hard Starfleet veterans. He strikes an immediate and powerful bond with Janeway, and an unusual one with Kim, who through Chakotay's example begins to question his own homogenization and the loss of his traditional values.

— Rick Berman, Michael Piller, Jeri Taylor, Chakotay's description, Star Trek: Voyager Bible, 1995

The inclusion of a Native American character in Star Trek: Voyager was suggested at an early stage in the development of the series. The producers were looking for an ethnic background which had not been seen before as a main character in the franchise. It was hoped that a Native American character would prove to be an inspiration in the same way that the appearance of Uhura in Star Trek: The Original Series later inspired Whoopi Goldberg and other African Americans. Executive producer Jeri Taylor said: "It seemed to us that Native Americans needed that same kind of role model and that same kind of boost ... the future looks good, you have purpose, you have worth, you have value, you will be leaders, you will be powerful. That was one character choice we had early on." Taylor's notes from the early production in July 1993 describe the character as "First Officer – a human native American male, a 'Queequeg' person who has renounced Earth and lives as an expatriate on another planet. A mystical, mysterious man with whom the Captain has some prior connection, not explained." A month later, this description was expanded with the line, "This man has made another choice – to re-enter the world of Starfleet." Chakotay was not the first Native American character to appear in the franchise, with "The Paradise Syndrome" in the third season of Star Trek: The Original Series showing a group of displaced humans following a Native American–like culture.

The producers aimed to develop some conflict between the members of the crew to produce a scenario similar to the Bajoran / Starfleet relationship seen in Star Trek: Deep Space Nine, but wanted the characters to share the same ideals. To do this, the Maquis were created – a group of Federation colonists from the Cardassian border in a disputed territory who were joined by some Starfleet officers who joined them to fight for their rights. The producers had the Maquis introduced in other Star Trek series before Voyager in four episodes; two in Star Trek: The Next Generation and two in Deep Space Nine.

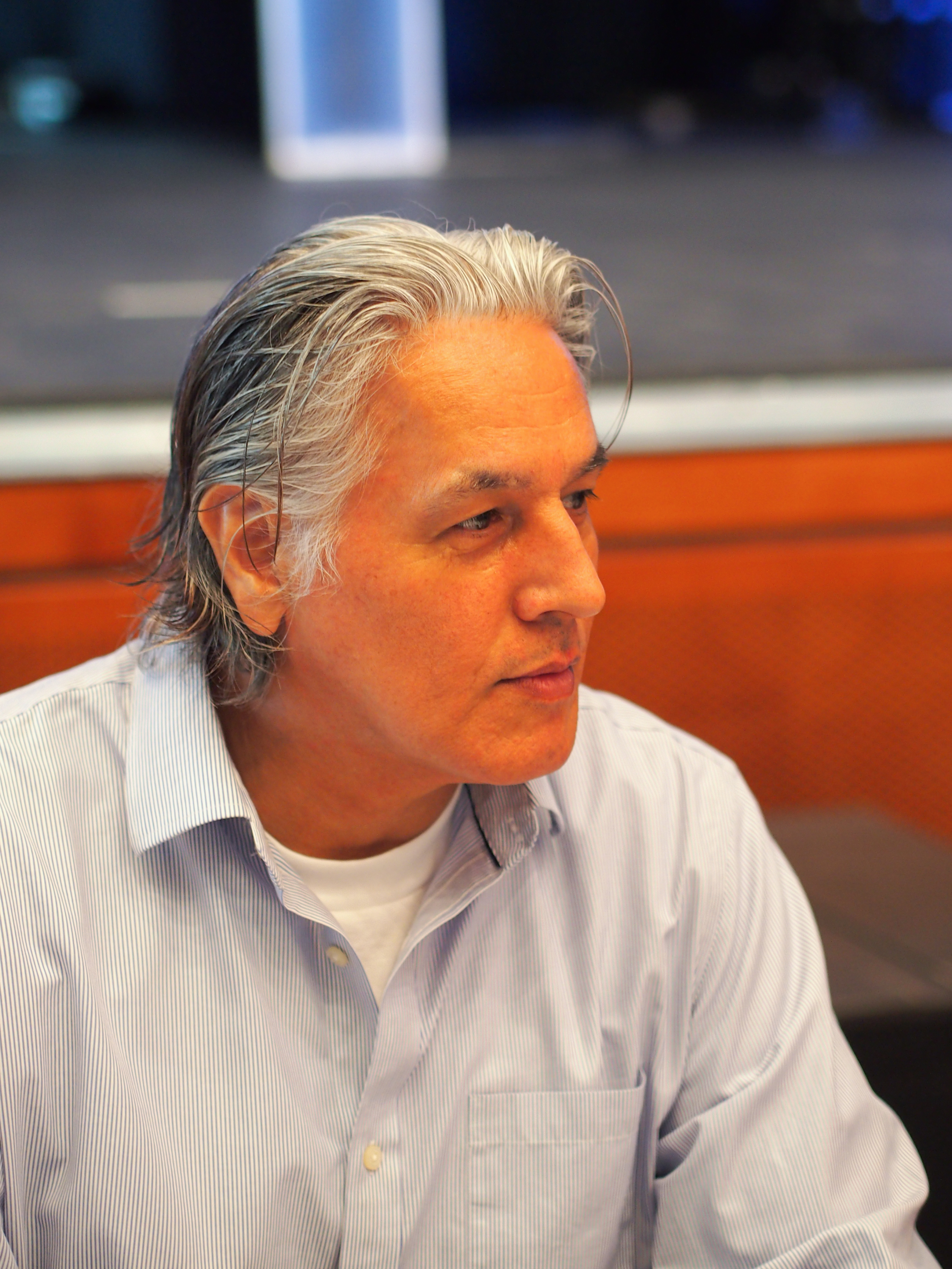
Chakotay was played by Robert Beltran across all seven seasons of Star Trek: Voyager.

In developing Chakotay, the producers sought the assistance of Jamake Highwater, a writer of more than 25 books of both fiction and non-fiction related to Native American myths and traditions. Highwater was a controversial choice of advisor, having been exposed by Hank Adams and Vine Deloria, Jr. as taking a fake Native American ancestry to sell books. Around September 21, 1993, Highwater gave seven pages of notes to producers regarding Chakotay's backstory, but his tribal ancestry was unresolved. By the end of that month, Michael Piller drafted the first version of the writer's bible for the series in which the character was named "Chakotoy". By the time Piller wrote the first draft of the story that eventually became the Voyager pilot "Caretaker", the character was known as "Chakotay" and been made a Sioux. By the third draft of the story, submitted at the start of November, he had become a Hopi, but by the following February, he once again had no tribal affiliation.

Winrich Kolbe, the director of "Caretaker", was involved in casting the main cast for the series. He described the casting process for the part of Chakotay as difficult due to the lower numbers of Native Americans who were in the Screen Actors Guild. The casting process came down to two actors, and the producers decided on Robert Beltran, who until then was best known for appearing in the soap opera Models Inc. and was of Mexican heritage. Beltran was not familiar with Star Trek before auditioning, and went along on the strength of the "Caretaker" script which showed the character becoming the second in command of Voyager after both their vessels are stranded in the Delta quadrant. Beltran explained the audition experience: "I felt neutral about the audition, didn't much care one way or the other. I went in the first time and wasn't really trying to get the part. They asked to see me again, and they wanted to see more of an edge to the character."

Chakotay was originally written as a "calm, stoic" character, but Beltran expanded on the character during the audition process, something that Kolbe credited him for. The writer's bible described Chakotay as a very traditional Native American with an altar and traditional art in his quarters. It also mentioned his spirit guide, something which was picked up in the media report in TV Guide. Beltran wore a facial tattoo while playing Chakotay, which was applied with make-up. The design was created by Michael Westmore, who deliberately created it so it did not represent any particular tribal culture. The in-universe story of the tattoo and Chakotay's tribal origins were explained in the episode "Tattoo".

Beltran gained the reputation on-set as a comedian. Following the first season and during a group interview with The Washington Times, Beltran joked that he was asked to perform in Hamlet during the summer in Albuquerque, but had been asked to wear Chakotay's facial tattoo. During that time, he worked on the Oliver Stone film Nixon (1995). During the period when Voyager was run by Taylor and Piller as the executive producers, Beltran gave feedback on the character which was taken into account. He later explained that this ended following the introduction of Jeri Ryan as Seven of Nine onto the cast and Brannon Braga taking over from Taylor and Piller. Beltran felt that Chakotay was one of the characters alongside Harry Kim, Tuvok, and Neelix who were left behind by the new writers, who tended to concentrate on Janeway, Seven, and The Doctor.

Beltran said that he was not aware of the effects this was having on the rest of the cast, saying: "For me it was like, 'OK, you can fire me if you want to. Go ahead, and I'll leave.'" He compared his experience on Voyager to working in a car factory, and said that the repetitive scenes meant that it limited his creativity. Beltran explained that it did not affect his relationship with the other actors, and in the end, he felt the producers decided to keep him on the cast as it did not make "very much difference, except to a very, very small percentage of fans who maybe didn't like what I said."

In an interview to publicize the final episode of Voyager, "Endgame", Beltran said: "We all had a great relationship with each other and we've all said how much we enjoy our crew. We have a terrific crew. But at the same time, I'm looking forward to what's next. It's exciting to know that something unknown is next." The final episode introduced a romance between Seven of Nine and Chakotay. Ryan found this relationship confusing for the characters, as although it had been suggested in the episode "Human Error", in the intervening episodes, the producers had told her and Beltran to ignore it.

== Appearances ==
=== Background ===
Chakotay's backstory was explained during the course of Star Trek: Voyager. He was born in 2329 on a Federation colony near Cardassian space in the demilitarized zone. While young, he was looked after by his grandfather. At the age of 15, Chakotay visited Earth with his father, who sought to find his tribe's ancestral home in Central America and the descendants of the Rubber Tree People. He was resistant to this, and instead dreamed of going into space and had heroes such as John Kelly, a pioneering astronaut in the early 21st century. He chose to enter Starfleet Academy against his father's wishes, and his entry was sponsored by Captain Sulu.^{[A]} He attended Starfleet Academy from 2344 to 2348, where he engaged in the sport of boxing. After graduating, he was assigned to a starship. One of his earliest away missions resulted in a diplomatic incident on Ktaria VII, and he was also on the team that made first contact with the Tarkannans.

He was assigned as an instructor in Starfleet's Advanced Tactical Training and achieved the rank of lieutenant commander. Following the death of his father in 2368 while defending his colony from the Cardassians, Chakotay resigned his Starfleet commission and joined the Maquis. At the time of his resignation, one of his students was Ro Laren. After he joined the Maquis, he became captain of a vessel named the Val Jean, with a crew which among others included his lover Seska (Martha Hackett), B'Elanna Torres (Roxann Dawson), and Tuvok (Tim Russ), who was actually Captain Janeway's Chief of Security, on an undercover mission to infiltrate the Maquis.

=== Star Trek: Voyager ===
==== The Kazon and Seska ====
In the pilot episode of Voyager, while the crew on the Val Jean seek to evade a Cardassian vessel captained by Gul Evek (Richard Poe) in the Badlands, the vessel is transported some 70,000 light years across the galaxy into the Delta Quadrant by the creature known as the Caretaker. After the Federation starship USS Voyager is also trapped in the Delta Quadrant and Tuvok was revealed to be a Starfleet agent, Chakotay agrees with Captain Kathryn Janeway (Kate Mulgrew) to work together to find two of their missing crew. Following an attack by the Kazon, Chakotay destroyed the Val Jean to save Voyager and the Maquis crew joined the Federation ship. Chakotay was given a provisional rank of commander and named executive officer, the second-in-command of the vessel and the crew seeks to return home to the Alpha Quadrant.

The Kazon continue to be a hindrance during Voyager's initial period in the Delta Quadrant, with Chakotay dismayed in "State of Flux" when Seska is revealed as a Cardassian spy who has been providing technology to the Kazon to seek an alliance. She escapes Voyager and sides with the Kazon-Nistrim, one of the factions within that species. Chakotay is rendered brain dead, but is made into a disembodied spirit able to possess other crewmembers in "Cathexis". The incident occurs while Tuvok and he were investigating a dark matter nebula, and he sought to prevent the ship from returning there, as an alien species wants to feed on the crew's neural energy. After Voyager enters the nebula, Chakotay possesses Neelix (Ethan Phillips) and guides the ship out using a medicine wheel as a map. Shortly afterwards, The Doctor (Robert Picardo) is able to restore Chakotay's mind into his body. At the end of the first season, Chakotay supported Tuvok's aim of helping the former Maquis crew adapt better to life on Voyager in "Learning Curve", by showing them the enforcement techniques of the Maquis.

In the second season episode "Tattoo", Chakotay meets with an alien race who influenced the ancestors of his tribe. They perceived Voyager as a threat because they had thought his people had been wiped out. He was able to resolve the problem using the teachings of his father. The Kazon returned and attacked Voyager in "Maneuvers", where they stole a transporter control module. Chakotay took it upon himself to retrieve the device, recognising that Seska was behind it. He managed to destroy it, but was captured and tortured by the Kazon in the process. He was rescued by Voyager, and shortly afterwards, he was contacted by Seska, who informed him that she had impregnated herself with his DNA. In "Resolutions", Chakotay and Janeway are infected with a virus which requires them to quarantine themselves on a nearby planet. The two began to show signs of affection for each other, but their stay is short-lived after Voyager under the captaincy of Tuvok agrees a deal with the Vidiians for a cure. The pair agree to return to the status quo on Voyager, but remain good friends.

Chakotay was contacted by Seska in "Basics" to say that his son had been born, and the Kazon were threatening to condemn her to the life of a slave. Voyager attempted to extract Seska and the child, but it was a trap and resulted in the Kazon boarding the vessel and stranding the Federation/Maquis crew on a nearby planet. While Tom Paris (Robert Duncan McNeil), The Doctor, and Lon Suder (Brad Dourif), along with allied Talaxian forces, sought to retake Voyager, Chakotay was instrumental in the crew's survival on the planet. He saved Kes (Jennifer Lien) from a local tribe, and built an alliance with them. The crew retook Voyager, and in the process Seska was killed. The child was discovered not to be Chakotay's, but instead a Cardassian/Kazon hybrid and the son of the Kazon-Nistrim leader First Maje Culluh (Anthony De Longis).

==== Entering Borg space ====
The first indication that Voyager was approaching Borg space was shown in the episode "Unity". While investigating a Federation distress call in a shuttlecraft, Chakotay was injured by the natives of a planet. Another group saves him, and Chakotay discovers that the colonists are former Borg whose access to the main hive-mind was disrupted. He is linked to a local hive-mind to help him to heal, and after being returned to Voyager, he is forced against his will to reactivate the colonists' former Borg Cube. Chakotay is released from the new "cooperative" after the Cube self-destructs, leaving the planet with a hive-mind separate from the main collective. Chakotay is captured by the Voth scientist Gegen (Henry Woronicz) in "Distant Origin", who is seeking to prove his hypothesis that the Voth came from Earth. When Gegen is placed on trial by his people, Chakotay seeks to argue in his defense. Ultimately, Gegen is forced to back down to save Voyager after the Voth threaten to destroy the vessel. Before they depart, Chakotay gives a model globe of the Earth to Gegen as a present.

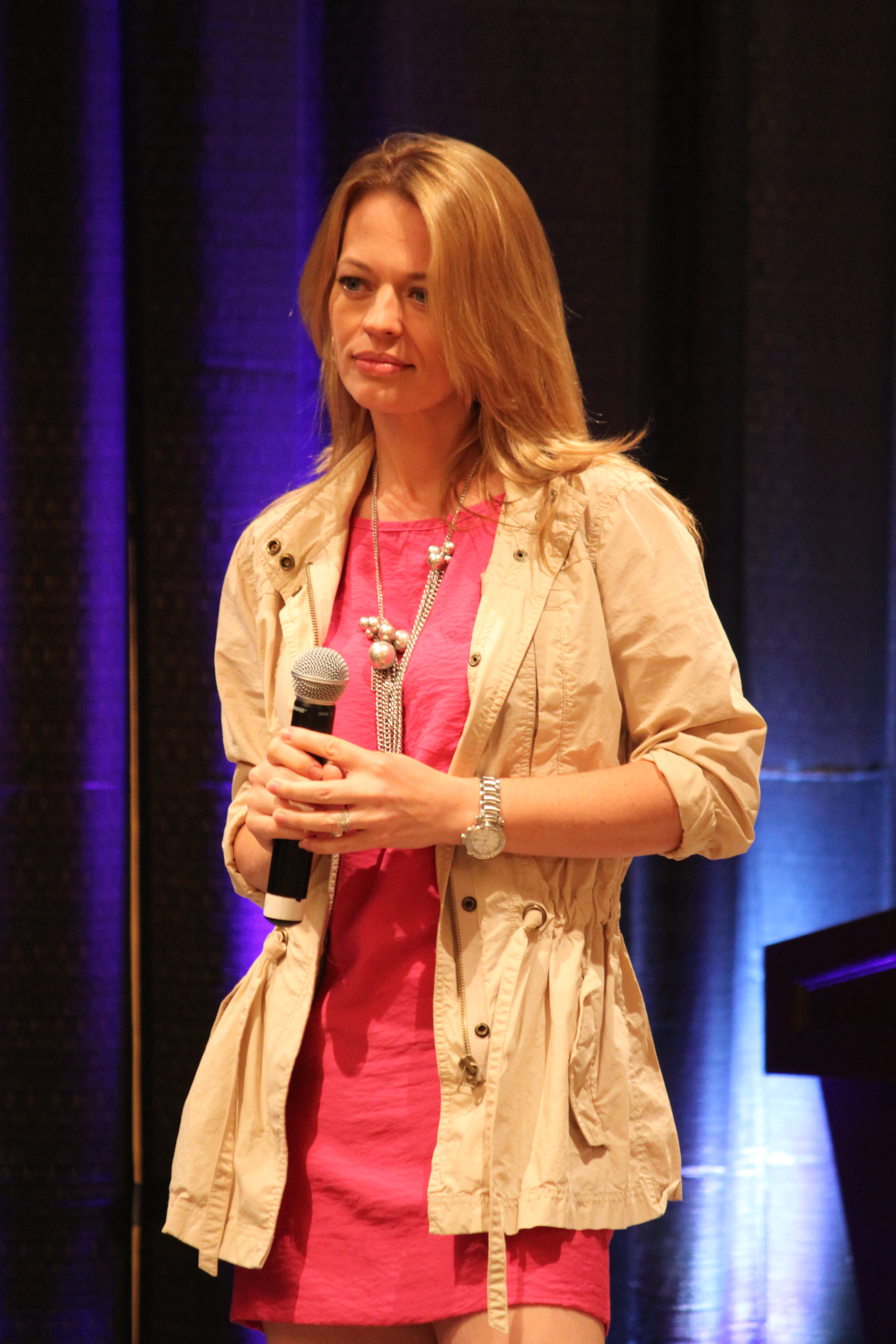
The relationship between Chakotay and Seven of Nine, played by Jeri Ryan (pictured), eventually led to romance by the end of the series.

His experience with the disconnected Borg resulted in Chakotay being against a plan to ally with the Borg against Species 8472 in "Scorpion", causing conflict between Captain Janeway and him. The alliance results in Seven of Nine and a number of other Borg drones being placed on Voyager and Janeway injured. Although he was ordered to continue with the alliance, Chakotay seeks to renegotiate the alliance, but Seven refuses any changes. When she opens a rift to Fluidic Space, Chakotay decompresses the cargo bay, sending all the Borg drones out into space with the exception of Seven. Later, when the Borg attempt to double-cross Voyager, Chakotay activates his localised neural link, confusing Seven and allowing Torres to disable her link to the Collective permanently.

Chakotay played an important role when Voyager was attacked in their dreams by a species that existed in a shared dream state, using meditative techniques of his people to induce a state of lucid dreaming that allowed him to wake himself up and plant a mental "command" that he would see Earth's moon in any dream. With the rest of the crew asleep with the exception of the Doctor, Chakotay was able to track down the aliens' home planet, ordering the Doctor to destroy the canyon where the dream species slept if they would not release the rest of the crew. During the "Year of Hell", Chakotay is captured by the Krenim scientist Annorax (Kurtwood Smith) on a Time Ship. The two first attempt to work together as Annorax agrees to restore the now damaged Voyager if Chakotay complies with his demands. After Annorax wipes out a species, though, he helps to disable the ship, allowing Captain Janeway to destroy it by ramming Voyager into it. This results in the timeline being reset, and the events of the episode were undone. In "Unforgettable", he falls in love with Kellin (Virginia Madsen), a member of a xenophobic race who have developed a technology to prevent others from forming long-term memories of them. As such, he is informed that they were previously in love when she was on Voyager a month earlier, and rekindle their relationship despite Chakotay not remembering the earlier encounter. Another member of her race removes Kellin's memories of Chakotay and installs a virus to remove all records of their race. Chakotay takes to writing out his memories of Kellin on paper so that he will not forget them.

He was placed in command of Voyager after Seven was captured by the Borg in "Dark Frontier" and destroyed a transwarp conduit. Chakotay is later one of the members of the crew who were captured by Borg children in "Collective" and was saved after Seven's intervention. Initially, Chakotay and Seven did not get along, but he would come to realise that he was mistaken in that opinion. Towards the end of the seventh season in "Human Error", Seven simulates a relationship with Chakotay on the holodeck. A Borg implant was preventing her from feeling strong emotions without any physical ill effects, which prevented her from seeking a romantic relationship with the real Chakotay. By the time of the series finale, "Endgame", The Doctor had managed to remove the implant, allowing Seven to pursue a relationship with Chakotay. The alternative future seen at the start of the episode showed that Seven and Chakotay were eventually married, but she died while Voyager was still travelling home. Chakotay died in 2394, following Voyager's return, and Admiral Janeway visits his grave marker in that episode. This future was undone by the future Janeway travelling back in time to Voyager to return it to Earth sooner.

=== Star Trek: Prodigy ===
Sometime prior to 2383, Chakotay was named Captain of the USS Protostar and was in command when the ship was taken by the Vau N'Akat. Chakotay's mission was to continue exploration of the Delta Quadrant after Voyager's return, but his ship fell through a time rift into the future where it was captured by the Vau N'Akat who blamed the Federation for the destruction of their home planet in a civil war. The Vau N'Akat attempted to use the Protostar to send a weapon called a living construct back in time to destroy the Federation, but Chakotay and his first officer Adreek-Hu managed to launch themselves with the weapon on board, forcing the Vau N'Akat to chase after it. At the end of the first season, following the destruction of the Protostar, a new temporal rift is opened through which Starfleet receives a distress call from Chakotay 52 years into the future.

In the second season, Janeway leads a rescue mission for Chakotay with her cadets, who were the ones to find and crew the Protostar after it was sent back in time, traveling into the future with the plan to help Chakotay and Adreek to launch the ship and then to rescue them. However, they accidentally change history, allowing Chakotay and Adreek to escape with their ship through the rift, sending it elsewhere and creating a temporal paradox that starts destroying the universe. With the help of Wesley Crusher, the cadets eventually find Chakotay in the present where he has been marooned for ten years on another planet, becoming a broken man following the loss of his crew and hope. The cadets manage to reignite Chakotay's spirit and help him to repair the Protostar and escape, reuniting with the Voyager-A and Janeway. With the universe still in danger from the paradox and Ascencia, the last of the hostile Vau N'Akat from the future, Janeway, Chakotay, and the cadets embark upon a mission to launch the Protostar into the past where it will be found by the younger selves of the cadets, repairing the timeline. Returning to Starfleet, Chakotay becomes the new captain of the Voyager-A before Mars is destroyed by rogue synths, changing everything for the Federation. Alongside Janeway and the Doctor, Chakotay gives the cadets field commissions as ensigns and the new Protostar-class ship, the USS Prodigy, which has been turned into a training ship. During their time together, Chakotay becomes a mentor to Dal R'El who expresses doubts about his future after seeing that he won't be the captain. Chakotay explains to Dal that he struggled all of his life to find a place where he belonged before becoming Voyager's first officer. While Chakotay wasn't the captain, being the loyal support of Janeway instead was where he finally found his purpose. Dal later takes this to heart, giving the captain's chair to Gwyn and serving as the first officer of the Prodigy instead.

== Reception ==
Some criticism was directed at Chakotay's character development during the series. James Lileks for the Star Tribune said that "Chakotay, the rock-solid First Officer, remained rock-solid", but also suggested that "[a]ll of the characters ended the series as they began."

Critics commented on the relationship between Janeway and Chakotay, with psychologist Richard Borofsky's views published in The Boston Herald. He suggested that by several seasons into Voyager, Chakotay had come to terms with his feelings for his Captain, but she was hesitant about entering into a relationship with a member of her crew. For the relationship to work in the future, it was said that Chakotay should not try to lead the relationship and Janeway needed to be more vulnerable. Following the end of Star Trek: Enterprise, the romance between Chakotay and Janeway was described in the Chicago Tribune as the one most wanted to be seen on screen in any of the Star Trek series, but that "it never panned out. Dang!" Chakotay's relationship with Seven was also commented on, and both UGO and io9 complained that the relationship appeared at random.

In 2016 Chakotay was ranked as the eleventh most important character out of 100 of Starfleet within the Star Trek science fiction universe by Wired magazine. In 2018, CBR ranked Chakotay the 20th best Starfleet character of Star Trek. In July 2019, Screen Rant ranked "The Fight" as one of the top five worst of the series, singling out Chakotay as a major problem in the show noting how he did not really fit in, and had poor development.

For his portrayal as Chakotay, Beltran won the Nosotros Golden Eagle Award for Outstanding Actor in a Television Series in 1997. He was nominated in 1996 for the NCLR Bravo Award for Outstanding Television Series Actor in a Crossover Role, and the ALMA Award for Outstanding Individual Performance in a Television Series in a Crossover Role in 1998 and 1999.

=== Themes ===
Chakotay's inclusion in the main cast of Voyager was seen by critics as one of several who were used to highlight the diversity within the series. This was highlighted during the episode "Faces", in which one scene showed Janeway, Tuvok, Harry Kim, and Chakotay in a single camera pan. Beltran's individual position was that he was "continually positioned as an exotic native other in relation to the white female Captain Janeway", and was used to "help the white protagonist and progress the internal narrative."

The placement of a character of indigenous peoples descent in science fiction was highlighted in the media. Drew Hayden Taylor said that Chakotay was "perhaps the most well-known". Of Chakotay's origin, he said: "They never actually say what nation he is, but I do believe it's some Central American tribe." Hayden Taylor wrote in a later article in 2012 describing the rise of Native American characters in the Twilight film series that Chakotay was still the sole popular example of a Native American character in science fiction. Chakotay was also described as "the only First Nations role model around in a futuristic setting" in the 2005 book, "Indian" Stereotypes in TV Science Fiction: First Nations' Voices Speak Out, but was also referred to as the "quintessential Tonto in outer space". A similar criticism was highlighted of the character in Medicine Bags and Dog Tags: American Indian Veterans from Colonial Times to the Second Iraq War (2008), which called Chakotay "a creature of white fantasies" and suggested that he was "far more stereotypical than Tonto" as "at least Tonto was heroic and saved the Lone Ranger once in a while".

Although religion was referenced during the Star Trek franchise, such as in the Star Trek: The Original Series episode "Who Mourns for Adonais?", it did not take a more prominent role until later in the series, with Star Trek: Deep Space Nine exploring the Bajorans' beliefs and Voyager concentrating on those of Chakotay. These included vision quests, and other interpretations of Native American culture which were described by critics as showing a "very Hollywood version of Plains-culture religion".

The appearance of a medicine wheel in the episode "Cathexis" was described by Sierra S. Adare as showing Chakotay as a "'good Indian' in the classic Pocahontas sense". Chakotay is seen attempting to introduce rituals and meditation techniques to other crew members, something they failed to understand. These were said to be contrary to the tribal history described in "Tattoo", which was said to say that Chakotay's tribe descended from a pre-Mayan culture in Central America. Adare attributed this to Euro-American/European writers writing inaccurate information into scripts. However, the appearance of the character was described as "groundbreaking".

== Notes ==
- A The reference to Captain Sulu in the episode "Tattoo" did not make it clear whether it was Hikaru Sulu or Demora Sulu to whom Chakotay referred; however, he stated that the Captain was a "he". The noncanon novels by Pocket Books have disagreed on which Captain Sulu to whom Chakotay referred. In a short story in the anthology Tales From The Captain Table, it is said to be Demora Sulu, but in Pathways by Jeri Taylor, it is stated that it was Hiromi Sulu, the son of Demora.
