= Peter David bibliography =

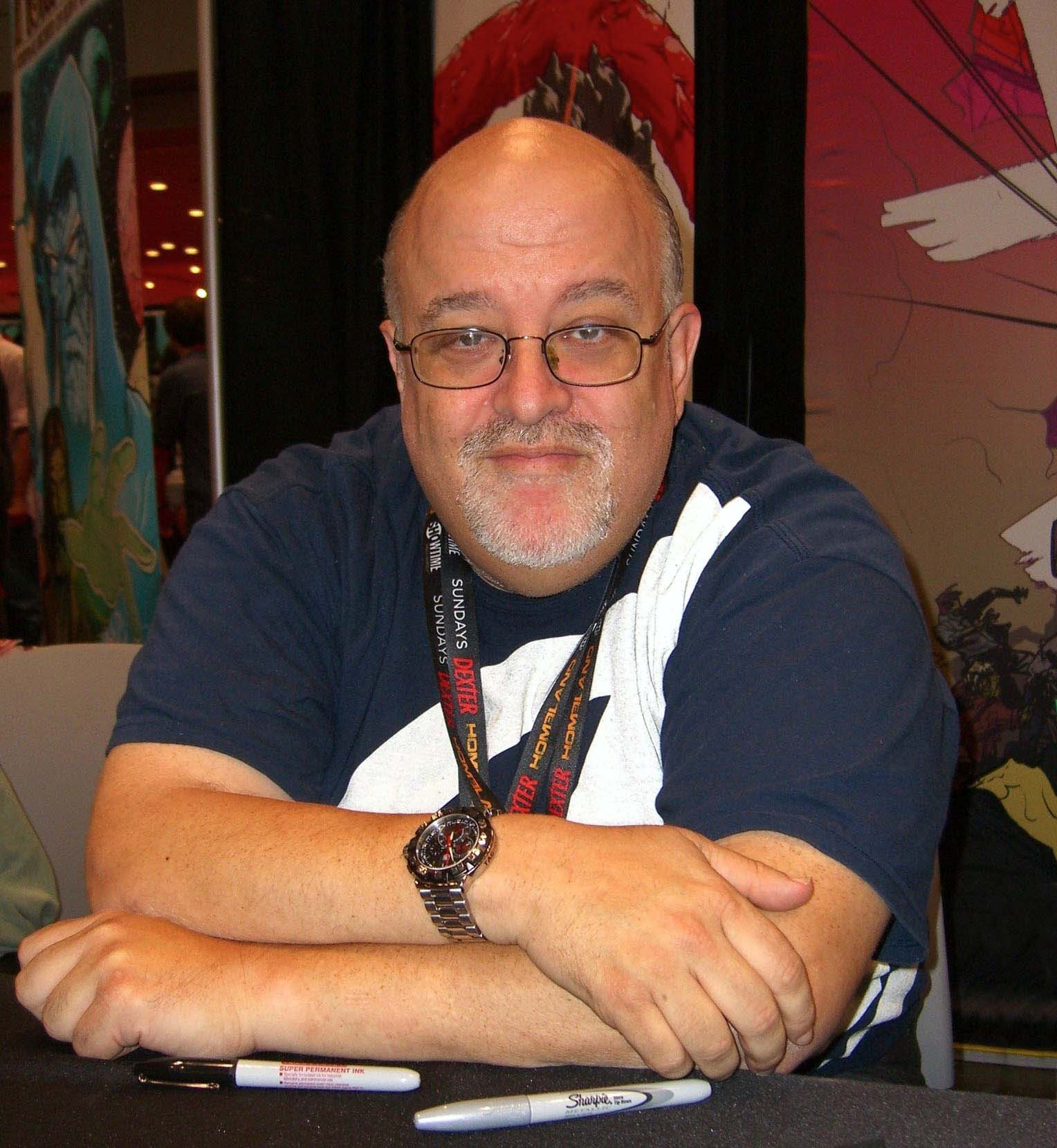
- David at the New York Comic Con in Manhattan, October 14, 2011
- Active period: 1985–2025

Publishers
- Marvel Comics: 1985–2025

This is a bibliography of works by writer Peter David.

== Novels ==
- Alien Nation: Body and Soul, Pocket Books, 1993. ISBN 0-671-73601-9
- Battlestar Galactica: Sagittarius Is Bleeding, Tor Books, 2006. ISBN 0-7653-1607-2
- Darkness of the Light, Tor Books, 2007. ISBN 9780765311733
- Dinotopia: The Maze, Random House Books, 1998. ISBN 0-679-88264-2
- Fantastic Four: What Lies Between, Pocket Star Books, 2007. ISBN 1-4165-1070-2
- Howling Mad, Ace Books, 1989. ISBN 0-441-34663-4
- The Incredible Hulk: What Savage Beast, Diane Pub Co, 1995. ISBN 0-7567-5967-6
- Tigerheart, Del Rey Books, 2008. ISBN 978-0-345-50159-2
- Wolverine: Election Day, Pocket Star Books, 2008. ISBN 1-4165-1076-1
- Year of the Black Rainbow (with Claudio Sanchez), 2010
- Fable: The Balverine Order, 2010. ISBN 0-441-02006-2
- Fable: Blood Ties, 2011. ISBN 978-1-937007-40-9
- The Camelot Papers, 2011. ISBN 978-0983687702
- Pulling Up Stakes, 2012.
- Pulling Up Stakes 2, 2012.
- Artful: A Novel, 2014. ISBN 978-1477823163
- Halo: Hunters in the Dark, 2015. ISBN 978-1-4767-9585-0

=== Modern Arthur ===
- Knight Life, Ace Hardcover, 1987. ISBN 0-441-00936-0
- One Knight Only, Ace, 2003. ISBN 0-441-01174-8
- Fall of Knight, Ace Hardcover, 2006. ISBN 0-441-01402-X

=== Photon ===
Written as David Peters:

- For the Glory (1987)
- High Stakes (1987)
- In Search of Mom (1987)
- This Is Your Life, Bhodi Li (1987)
- Exile (1987)
- Skin Deep (1988)

=== Psi-Man ===
Written as David Peters:

- Mind-Force Warrior, Diamond/Charter, 1990. ISBN 1-55773-399-6
- Deathscape, Diamond/Charter, 1990. ISBN 1-55773-450-X
- Main Street D.O.A., Diamond/Charter, 1991. ISBN 1-55773-492-5
- The Chaos Kid, Diamond/Charter, 1991. ISBN 0-441-00745-7
- Stalker, Diamond/Charter, 1991. ISBN 1-55773-617-0
- Haven, Diamond/Charter, 1992. ISBN 1-55773-709-6

=== Sir Apropos of Nothing ===
- Sir Apropos of Nothing, Pocket Books, 2002. ISBN 0-7434-1234-6
- The Woad to Wuin, Pocket Star, 2003. ISBN 0-7434-4832-4
- Tong Lashing, Pocket Star, 2003. ISBN 0-7434-4912-6
- Sir Apropos of Nothing and the Adventure of the Receding Heir (short story, published in the anthology Heroes in Training, 2007, ISBN 978-0756404383)
- Gypsies, Vamps, and Thieves (with Robin Riggs), IDW Publishing, 2009. ISBN 1-60010-451-7
- Pyramid Schemes, Second Age, Inc., 2016. ISBN 978-0983687771

=== Movie novelizations ===
- The Return of Swamp Thing, Berkley, 1989. ISBN 0515101133
- The Rocketeer, Bantam, 1991. ISBN 0-553-29322-2
- Batman Forever, Warner Books Inc., 1995. ISBN 0-446-60217-5
- Spider-Man, Del Rey, 2002. ISBN 0-345-45005-1
- Hulk, Del Rey, 2003. ISBN 0-345-45967-9
- Spider-Man 2, Del Rey, 2004. ISBN 0-345-47054-0
- Fantastic Four, Pocket Star, 2005. ISBN 1-4165-0980-1
- Spider-Man 3, Del Rey, 2007.
- Iron Man, Del Rey, 2008.
- The Incredible Hulk, Del Rey, 2008. ISBN 978-0-345-50699-3
- Transformers: Dark of the Moon, Del Rey, 2011.
- Battleship, Del Rey, 2012.
- After Earth, Del Rey, 2013.

=== Babylon 5 ===
Based on an outline by J. Michael Straczynski:

- Legions of Fire, Book 1—The Long Night of Centauri Prime, Del Rey, 1999. ISBN 0-345-42718-1
- Legions of Fire, Book 2—Armies of Light and Dark, Del Rey, 2000. ISBN 0-345-42719-X
- Legions of Fire, Book 3—Out of the Darkness, Del Rey, 2000. ISBN 0-345-42720-3
- Babylon 5: In the Beginning, Del Rey, 1995. ISBN 0-345-48363-4 (Movie novelization; Based on a screenplay by J. Michael Straczynski)
- Babylon 5: Thirdspace, Del Rey, 1998. ISBN 0-345-42454-9 (Movie novelization; Based on a screenplay by J. Michael Straczynski)

== Comics ==
- Action Comics Weekly #608–620 (Green Lantern serial; #615, 619–620, plot with Richard Howell) (1988)
- The Phantom #1–4 (1988)
- Secret Origins #32 (1988)
- Justice #15–32 (1988–1989)
- Blasters Special #1 (1989)
- Dreadstar #41–64 (1989–1991)
- Starman #35 (1991)
- Creepy: The Limited Series #1–4 (1992)
- Sachs and Violens #1–4 (1993)
- Justice League Task Force #7–8 (1993–1994)
- Captain America Drug War (1994)
- Showcase '94 #7 (1994)
- Dreadstar #0.5, 1–6 (1994)
- DC vs. Marvel (#2 and #4 only) (1996)
- Heroes Reborn: The Return #1–4 (1997)
- Babylon 5: In Valen's Name (with J. Michael Straczynski), DC Comics, 1998. ISBN 185286981X
- Legends of the DC Universe 80-Page Giant #1 (1998)
- Tangent Comics/Wonder Woman #1 (1998)
- Star Wars Tales #1 (1999)
- President Luthor Secret Files and Origins #1 (2001)
- Powerpuff Girls: Hide and Go Mojo (2002) ISBN 0-439-33249-4
- The Haunted #1–4 (2002)
- Marvel Mangaverse: The Punisher #1 (2002)
- The Haunted: Gray Matters #1 (2002)
- Teenage Mutant Ninja Turtles (2003) #1–7 (2003)
- DC Comics Presents: Justice League of America #1 (2004)
- Red Sonja vs. Thulsa Doom #1–4 (with Luke Lieberman and Will Conrad), Dynamite Entertainment, 2006. ISBN 1-933305-96-7
- Spike: Old Times (with Scott Tipton and Fernando Goni), IDW Publishing, 2006. ISBN 1-60010-030-9
- Spike vs. Dracula #1–5 (with Joe Corroney and Mike Ratera), IDW Publishing, 2006. ISBN 1-60010-012-0
- Wonder Man: My Fair Super Hero #1–5 (2007)
- The Scream #1–4 (2007)
- Halo: Helljumper #1–5 (2009)
- Disney's Epic Mickey: Tales of Wasteland (digicomic, 2010)
- Epic Mickey: The Graphic Novel (2010)
- Tron: Original Movie Adaptation #1–2 (2011)
- Epic Mickey 2: The Power of Two Graphic Novel (2012)
- Deadpool’s Art of War #1–4 (2014)
- The Phantom: Danger in the Forbidden City #1–6 (2014)
- Marvel Future Fight #1 (2015)
- Battlestar Galactica vs. Battlestar Galactica #1—6 (Crossover of the 1978 and 2004 series, January – June 2018)
- Marvel Comics #1000 (amongst others) (2019)
- Elektra: Black, White & Blood #2 (2022)

=== Aquaman ===
- The Atlantis Chronicles #1–7 (1990)
- Aquaman: Time and Tide #1–4 (with Kirk Jarvinen) (1993)
- Aquaman Vol. 5 #0–46, Annual 1–4 (1994–1998)

=== Avengers ===
- The Last Avengers Story #1–2 (1995)
- Avengers: Season One (2012)
- Avengers: Back to Basics #1–6 (2018)

=== Captain Marvel (Marvel Comics) ===
- Captain Marvel Vol. 4 #1–35, 0 (1999–2002)
- Captain Marvel Vol. 5 #1–25 (2002–2004)
- Genis-Vell: Captain Marvel #1–5 (2022)

=== Fallen Angel ===
- Fallen Angel #1–20 (DC) (2003–2005)
- Fallen Angel #1–33 (IDW) (2005–2008)
- Fallen Angel: Reborn #1–4 (2010)
- Fallen Angel: Return of the Son #1–4 (2011)

=== Fantastic Four ===
- Before the Fantastic Four: Reed Richards #1–3 (2000)
- Marvel 1602: Fantastick Four #1–5 (2005)
- Fantastic Four: The Prodigal Sun #1 (2019)
- Silver Surfer: The Prodigal Sun #1 (2019)
- Guardians of the Galaxy: The Prodigal Sun #1 (2019)
- New Fantastic Four #1–5 (2022)

=== Marvel Cinematic Universe ===
- Iron Man: I Am Iron Man! #1–2 (2010)
- Marvel's Captain America: The First Avenger #1–2 (2013)
- Marvel's Captain America: The Winter Soldier Infinite Comic (2014)
- Marvel's Black Widow Prelude #1–2 (2020)

=== The Incredible Hulk ===
- Hulk Visionaries: Peter David, Volume 1 (with Todd McFarlane), Marvel Comics, 2005. ISBN 0-7851-1541-2. Collects Incredible Hulk #331–339 (1987–1988).
- Hulk Visionaries: Peter David, Volume 2 (with Todd McFarlane, Erik Larsen, and Jeff Purves), Marvel Comics, 2005. ISBN 0-7851-1878-0. Collects Incredible Hulk #340–348 (1988).
- Hulk Visionaries: Peter David, Volume 3 (with Jeff Purves, Alex Saviuk, and Keith Pollard), Marvel Comics, 2006. ISBN 0-7851-2095-5. Collects Incredible Hulk #349–354 and Web of Spider-Man #44 (1988–1989).
- Hulk Visionaries: Peter David, Volume 4 (with Bob Harras, Jeff Purves, and Dan Reed), Marvel Comics, 2007. ISBN 0-7851-2096-3. Collects Incredible Hulk #355–363 and Marvel Comics Presents #26 and #45 (1989–1990).
- Hulk Visionaries: Peter David, Volume 5 (with Jeff Purves, Dale Keown, Sam Kieth, and Angel Medina), Marvel Comics, 2008. ISBN 978-0-7851-2757-4. Collects Incredible Hulk #364–372 and Incredible Hulk Annual #16 (1989–1990).
- Hulk Visionaries: Peter David, Volume 6 (with Dale Keown,), Marvel Comics, 2009. ISBN 978-0-7851-3762-7. Collects Incredible Hulk #373–382 (1990–1991).
- Hulk Visionaries: Peter David, Volume 7 (with Dale Keown,), Marvel Comics, 2010. ISBN 978-0-7851-4457-1. Collects Incredible Hulk #383–389 and Incredible Hulk Annual #17 (1991–1992).
- Hulk Visionaries: Peter David, Volume 8 (with Dale Keown), Marvel Comics, 2011. ISBN 978-0-7851-5603-1. Collects Incredible Hulk #390–396, X-Factor #76 and Incredible Hulk Annual #18 (1992).
- Epic Collection 19: Ghosts of the Past (with Dale Keown), Marvel Comics, 2015. ISBN 978-0-7851-9299-2. Collects Incredible Hulk #397–406 and Incredible Hulk Annual #18–19 (1992).
- Epic Collection 20: Future Imperfect, Marvel Comics, 2017 ISBN 978-1302904708. Collects Incredible Hulk #407–419, Annual #20, Incredible Hulk: Future Imperfect #1–2 and material from Marvel Holiday Special #3
- Epic Collection 21: Fall of the Pantheon, Marvel Comics 2018.ISBN 978-1302910242. Collects Tales to Astonish (1994) #1, Incredible Hulk vs. Venom #1, Incredible Hulk #420–435
- Epic Collection 22: Ghosts of the Future, Marvel Comics, 2019.ISBN 978-1302916268. Collects Incredible Hulk #436–448, Savage Hulk #1 and more.
- Tempest Fugit (with Lee Weeks), Marvel Comics, 2005. ISBN 0-7851-1543-9. Collects Incredible Hulk Vol. 2 #77–82.
- House of M: Incredible Hulk, Marvel Comics, 2006 ISBN 978-0785118343. Collects Incredible Hulk Vol. 2 #83–87
- Incredible Hulk #328, 331–359, 361–467, -1 (1987–1998)
  - Incredible Hulk Annual #16–20 (1990–1994)
- Incredible Hulk Vol. 2 #33 (reprints Incredible Hulk #335), #77–87 (2005)
- Incredible Hulk: Future Imperfect #1–2 (1992)
- Incredible Hulk vs. Venom #1 (1994)
- Tales to Astonish vol. 3 #1 (1994)
- Prime vs. The Incredible Hulk #0 (1995)
- Savage Hulk #1 (1996)
- Incredible Hulk/Hercules: Unleashed #1 (1996)
- Hulk/Pitt #1 (1997)
- Hulk: The End #1 (2002)
- What If General Ross Had Become the Hulk? #1 (2005)
- Hulk: Destruction #1–4 (2005)
- Giant-Size Hulk #1 (2006)
- World War Hulk Prologue: World Breaker #1 (2007)
- Marvel Adventures: Hulk #13-16 (2008)
- Hulk vs. Fin Fang Foom #1 (2008)
- The Incredible Hulk: The Big Picture #1 (2008)
- Hulk: Broken Worlds #1 (2009)
- Future Imperfect: Warzones! #1–5 (2015)
- Secret Wars: Battleworld #4 (2015)
- Incredible Hulk: Last Call #1 (2019)
- Maestro #1–5 (2020)
- Maestro: War and Pax #1–5 (2021)
- Maestro: World War M #1–5 (2022)
- Joe Fixit #1–5 (2023)

=== She-Hulk ===
- The Sensational She-Hulk #12 (1989)
- She-Hulk Vol. 2 #22–38 (2007–2009)
- She-Hulk: Cosmic Collision #1 (2009)
- She-Hulk: Sensational #1 (2010)

=== Soulsearchers & Company ===
- Soulsearchers & Company: On the Case! #1–82 (1993–2007) (with Richard Howell, Amanda Conner, Jim Mooney)

=== Spider-Man ===
- The Death of Jean DeWolff (with Rich Buckler), Marvel Comics, 1991. ISBN 0-87135-704-6
- Amazing Spider-Man #266–267, 278, 289, 525
- Peter Parker, The Spectacular Spider-Man #103, 105–110, 112–113, 115-119, 121–123, 128–129
  - Peter Parker, The Spectacular Spider-Man Annual #5–6
- The Spectacular Spider-Man #134–136
- Web of Spider-Man #7, 12–13. 40–44, 49
  - Web of Spider-Man Annual #6
- Spider-Man Special Edition #1 (1992)
- Spider-Man 2099 #1–44 (1993–1996)
  - Spider-Man 2099 Annual #1
  - Spider-Man 2099 Meets Spider-Man #1
- Spider-Man Gen^{13} #1 (1996)
- Spider-Man Family Featuring Spider-Clan #1 (2005)
- Friendly Neighborhood Spider-Man #1, 4–23 (2005–2007)
  - Friendly Neighborhood Spider-Man Annual #1
- Marvel Knights: Spider-Man #19 (2005)
- Spider-Man: The Other (with Reginald Hudlin, J. Michael Straczynski, Pat Lee, Mike Wieringo, and Mike Deodato), Marvel Comics, 2006. ISBN 0-7851-2188-9
- Marvel Adventures: Spider-Man #17–19 (2006), 31 (2007)
- What If? Spider-Man: The Other (2007)
- Amazing Spider-Man Vol. 3 #1 (2014)
- Spider-Man 2099 Vol. 2 #1–12 (2014–2015)
- Spider-Man 2099 Vol. 3 #1–25 (2015–2017)
- Secret Wars 2099 #1–5 (2015)
- Ben Reilly: The Scarlet Spider #1–25 (2017–2018)
- Sensational Spider-Man: Self-Improvement #1 (2019)
- Symbiote Spider-Man #1–5 (2019)
- Absolute Carnage: Symbiote Spider-Man #1 (2019)
- Symbiote Spider-Man: Alien Reality #1–5 (2019–2020)
- Symbiote Spider-Man: King in Black #1–5 (2020–2021)
- Symbiote Spider-Man: Crossroads #1–5 (2021)
- Symbiote Spider-Man 2099 #1–5 (2024)

=== Spyboy ===
Written with Pop Mhan and Norman Lee.

- SpyBoy #1–12, 14–17 (1999–2001)
- SpyBoy: Motorola Special (2000)
- SpyBoy/Young Justice #1–3 (2002)
- SpyBoy Special: The Manchurian Candy Date (2002)
- SpyBoy: The M.A.N.G.A Affair (also known as SpyBoy #13.1–13.3, compiled The M.A.N.G.A Affair miniseries #1–3) (2003)
- SpyBoy: Final Exam #1–4 (2004)

=== Supergirl ===
- Supergirl Vol. 4 #1–80, Annual #1–2, Supergirl Plus #1, #1000000, Showcase '96 #8 (with Gary Frank and Terry Dodson), DC Comics (1996-2003)
- Many Happy Returns (written with Ed Benes), DC Comics, 2003. ISBN 1-4012-0085-0

=== Wolverine ===
- Wolverine vol. 2 #9, 11–16, 24, 44 (1989, 1990, 1991)
- Wolverine: Rahne of Terra (1991)
- Wolverine: Global Jeopardy #1 (1993)
- Wolverine: Blood Hungry, collecting Marvel Comics Presents #85–92 (Wolverine serial) (1993)
- Wolverine: First Class #13–21 (2009)

=== X-Factor ===
- X-Factor vol. 1 #55, 70–89 (1990–1993)
  - X-Factor Annual #6–8
- MadroX: Multiple Choice (with Pablo Raimondi), Marvel Comics, 2005. ISBN 0-7851-1500-5
- X-Factor Vol. 3 #1–50, #200–262 (2005–2013)
  - X-Factor: The Quick and the Dead #1
  - X-Factor: Layla Miller #1
  - Nation X: X-Factor #1
- All-New X-Factor #1–20 (2014–2015)
- X-Men Legends vol. 1 #5–6 (2021)

=== Young Justice ===
- Young Justice #1–7, 9–21, 23–55, #1000000, DC Comics (1998–2003)
- Young Justice: Sins of Youth #1–2 (2000)
- Young Justice: A League of Their Own (with Todd Nauck), DC Comics, 2000. ISBN 1-84023-197-1

== Star Trek ==
Collections of DC Comics issues

- The Trial of James T. Kirk (Star Trek Comics Classics trade paperback, reprint of DC Comics issues, with James W. Fry and Gordon Purcell), Titan Books, 2006. ISBN 1-84576-315-7
- Death Before Dishonor (Star Trek Comics Classics trade paperback, reprint of DC Comics issues, with James W. Fry and Arne Starr), Titan Books, 2006. ISBN 1-84576-154-5
- Star Trek Archives Volume 1: Best of Peter David, 2008, ISBN 978-1600102424

Captain Sulu Adventures

- Cacophony (under the pseudonym J.J. Molloy), Simon & Schuster (Trade Division), 1994. ISBN 0-671-85331-7

Captain's Table

- Once Burned, Pocket Books, 1998. ISBN 0-671-02078-1
- Tales From The Captain's Table, story "Pain Management", Pocket Books, 2005. ISBN 1-4165-0520-2

Deep Space Nine

- The Siege, Pocket Books, 1993.
- Wrath of the Prophets (with Robert Greenberger and Michael Jan Friedman), Pocket Books, 1997. ISBN 0-671-53817-9

Gateways

- Cold Wars, Pocket Books, 2001. ISBN 0-671-04242-4
- What Lay Beyond (with Diane Carey, Keith R. A. DeCandido, Christie Golden, Robert Greenberger, Susan Wright), Pocket Books, 2002. ISBN 0-7434-5683-1

Starfleet Academy

- Worf's First Adventure, Simon & Schuster, 1993. ISBN 0-671-85212-4
- Line of Fire, Simon & Schuster, 1993. ISBN 0-671-87085-8
- Starfleet Academy—Survival, Simon & Schuster, 1994. ISBN 0-671-85214-0

New Frontier

- House of Cards, Pocket Books, 1997. ISBN 0-671-01395-5
- Into the Void, Pocket Books, 1997. ISBN 0-671-01396-3
- The Two Front War, Pocket Books, 1997. ISBN 0-671-01397-1
- End Game, Pocket Books, 1997. ISBN 0-671-01398-X
- Martyr, Pocket Books, 1998. ISBN 0-671-02036-6
- Fire on High, Pocket Books, 1998. ISBN 0-671-02037-4
- Star Trek: New Frontier (collection), Pocket Books, 1998. ISBN 0-671-01978-3
- The Quiet Place, Pocket Books, 1999. ISBN 0-671-02079-X
- Dark Allies, Pocket Books, 1999. ISBN 0-671-02080-3
- Double Time (graphic novel), DC Comics, 2000. ISBN 1-56389-760-1
- Excalibur, Book 1: Requiem, Pocket Books, 2000. ISBN 0-671-04238-6
- Excalibur, Book 2: Renaissance, Pocket Books, 2000. ISBN 0-671-04239-4
- Excalibur, Book 3: Restoration, Pocket Books, 2001. ISBN 0-7434-1064-5
- Being Human, Pocket Books, 2001. ISBN 0-671-04240-8
- Gods Above, Pocket Books, 2003. ISBN 0-7434-1858-1
- Stone and Anvil, Pocket Books, 2004. ISBN 0-7434-9618-3
- After the Fall, Pocket Books, 2004. ISBN 0-7434-9185-8
- Missing in Action, Pocket Books, 2006. ISBN 1-4165-1080-X
- Treason, Pocket Books, 2009. ISBN 0-7434-2961-3
- Blind Man's Bluff, Gallery Books, 2011. ISBN 978-0-7434-2960-3
- The Returned: Part 1, Pocket Books, 2015.
- The Returned: Part 2, Pocket Books, 2015.
- The Returned: Part 3, Pocket Books, 2015.

The Next Generation

- Strike Zone, Pocket Books, 1989. ISBN 0-671-74647-2
- A Rock and a Hard Place, Pocket Books, 1990. ISBN 0-671-74142-X
- Vendetta, Pocket Books, 1991. ISBN 0-671-74145-4
- Q-in-Law, Pocket Books, 1991. ISBN 0-8359-1105-5
- Imzadi, Pocket Books, 1993. ISBN 0-671-02610-0
- Q-Squared, Pocket Books, 1994. ISBN 0-671-89151-0
- Double Helix—Double or Nothing, Pocket Books, 1999. ISBN 0-671-03478-2
- Imzadi II: Triangle, Pocket Books, 1999. ISBN 0-671-02538-4
- I, Q (with John de Lancie), Pocket Books, 2000. ISBN 0-671-02444-2
- Imzadi Forever, Pocket Books, 2003. ISBN 0-7434-8510-6
- Before Dishonor, Pocket Books, 2007. ISBN 1-4165-2742-7
- Star Trek: The Next Generation - IDW 2020(comic special), IDW Comics, 2019.

The Original Series

- The Rift, Pocket Books, 1991. ISBN 0-671-74796-7
- The Disinherited (with Michael Jan Friedman and Robert Greenberger), Pocket Books, 1992. ISBN 0-671-77958-3
- The Captain's Daughter, Pocket Books, 1995. ISBN 0-671-52047-4

Non-fiction

- Beam Me Up, Scotty (co-author, autobiography of James Doohan), 1996. ISBN 0-671-52056-3

== Short fiction ==
- "The Archetype". F&SF. 96 (2). Feb 1999.
- "One Fateful Knight" in the anthology Short Trips: The Quality of Leadership, Big Finish Productions, 2008. ISBN 978-1-84435-269-2
- "Bronsky's Dates with Death". F&SF. 121 (1&2): 8–32. Jul–Aug 2011.
- "The Robin Hood Fan's Tale," The Fans are Buried Tales, Crazy 8 Press ISBN 978-1732457744

== Screenwriting credits ==
- Ben 10: Alien Force
  - "In Charm's Way"
- Ben 10: Ultimate Alien
  - "Reflected Glory"
  - "Prisoner Number 775 Is Missing"
  - "Solitary Alignment"
- Babylon 5
  - "Soul Mates"
  - "There All the Honor Lies"
- Young Justice
  - "Secrets"
  - "Insecurity"
  - "Bloodlines"
  - "Intervention"
  - "Triptych"

== Essays and instructional ==
- But I Digress, Krause Publications, 1994. ISBN 0-87341-286-9
- Writing for Comics with Peter David, Impact Books, 2006. ISBN 1-58180-730-9
- More Digressions: A New Collection of 'But I Digress' Columns, Mad Norwegian Press, 2009. ISBN 978-1935234005
- Mr. Sulu Grabbed My Ass, and Other Highlights from a Life in Comics, Novels, Television, Films and Video Games, McFarland, 2020. ISBN 9781476683546
