= Billy Tucci =

American comics creator

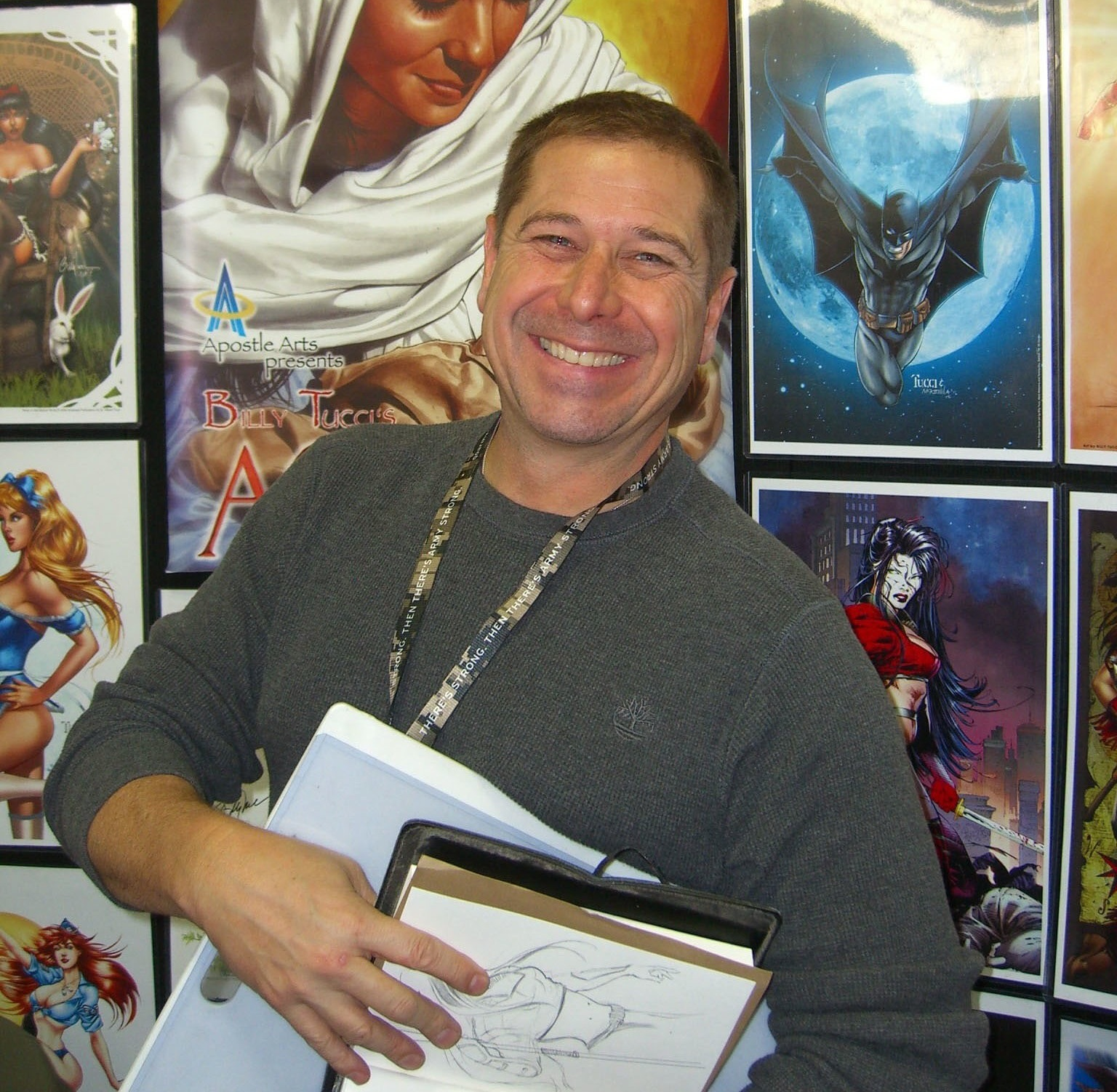
- Tucci at the 2012 New York Comic Con
- Born: William Tucci New York, New York, U.S.
- Areas: Writer, penciller Founder of Crusade Fine Arts, Ltd.
- Notable works: Shi; Sgt. Rock: The Lost Battalion
- Awards: MWSA Gold Medal; Christian Small Publisher Book of the Year Award; Ambassador, de la Region de Bruyeres; Inkpot Award (2019)

William Tucci (/ˈtuːtʃi/) is an American comics creator. He is best known for his creator-owned title and character Shi.

== Career ==
Tucci founded Crusade Comics in Bayport, New York Its flagship title, Shi, debuted in March 1994. Publisher Top Cow's character Witchblade and David W. Mack's character Kabuki debuted in Shi before going on to their own titles. Tucci operated Crusade Comics until 2002, publishing a number of other titles besides Shi. Brian David-Marshall worked as an editor at Crusade in the 1990s.

In 2006 Tucci began penciling Marvel Comics' Heroes for Hire, and DC's VS cards, and later on the DC series Jonah Hex, Birds of Prey, Flash Vs. Superman and Harley Quinn. He also released the 576-page Definitive Shi, the Illustrated Warrior.

In 2007, Shi also had a crossover with Brian Pulido's Lady Death/Shi through Avatar Press, and with Peter David's Fallen Angel through IDW Publishing. Dark Horse Comics produced a 200-page hardbound Art of Shi coffee table book showcasing several artists' take on the character. Other Shi projects include a full color Zombie-sama! TPB with John Broglia and Definitive Shi Vol. 2.

Tucci produced a six-part miniseries for DC, Sgt. Rock: The Lost Battalion, which premiered November 2008. In researching the series, Tucci spent time with a World War II reenactment in Pennsylvania, portraying a war correspondent, and during his research in France, officials gave him the title of "Ambassador, de la region de Bruyeres". The Lost Battalion received the 2011 "Artistic/Graphical" Gold Medal in the Fiction-Thriller category from the Military Writers Society of America (MWSA).

In 2011, Tucci's "Batman: A Trick for the Scarecrow", which appeared in the DCU Halloween Special 2010, was nominated for the Eisner Award for Best Short Story.

As partner of Apostle Arts LLC, Tucci created Billy Tucci's A Child is Born, a 32-page graphic novella for Christmas 2011, adapted from the Gospels of Matthew and Luke. The book won a Christian Small Publisher Book of the Year Award in 2013.

Tucci wrote and illustrated Shi: Return of the Warrior (2021) and wrote Zombie-Sama!, a comedy graphic novel with illustrator John Broglia, both published by Crusade Fine Arts via funding from Indiegogo and KickStarter.
