= J. K. Woodward =

Comic-book artist

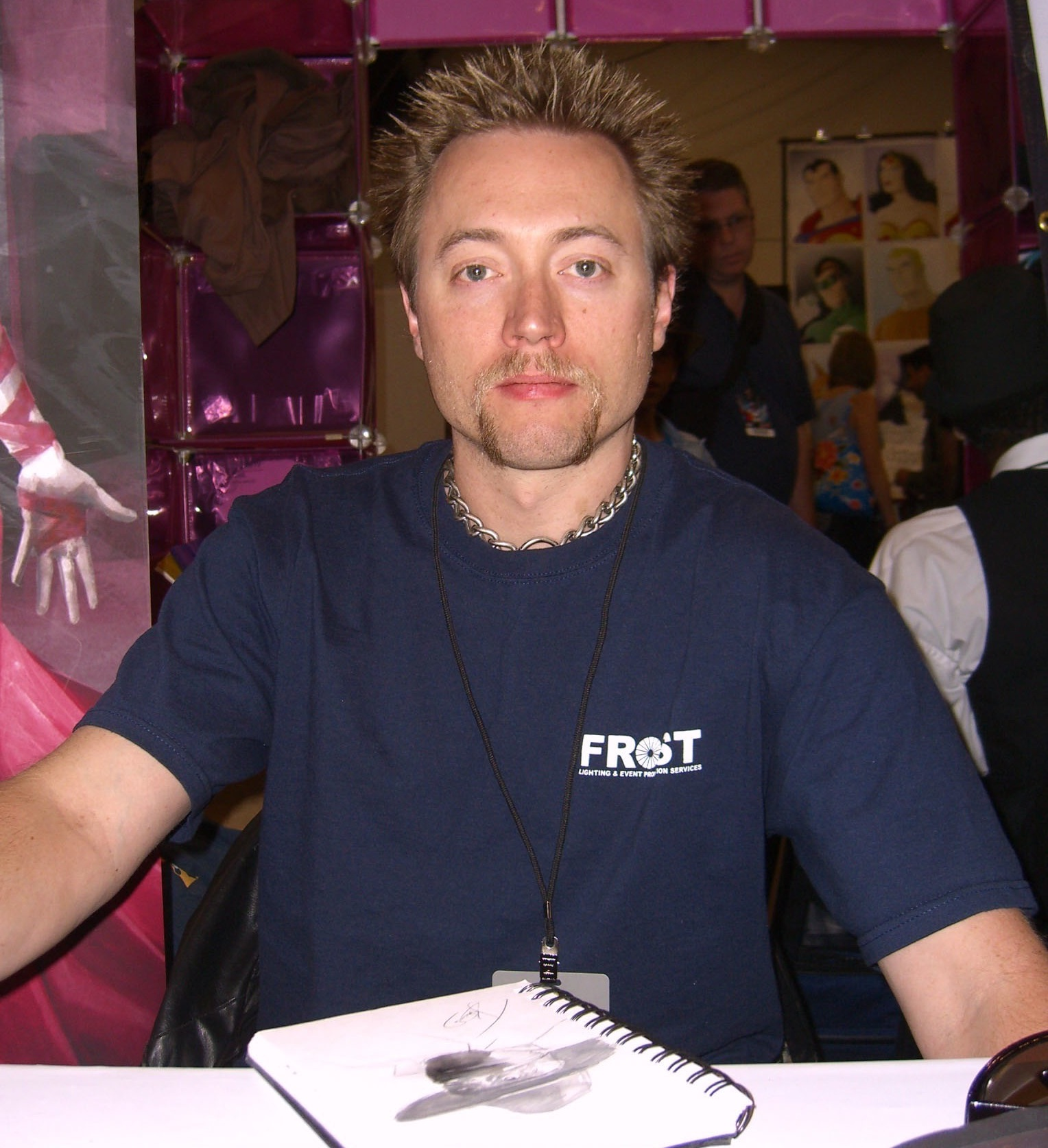
- Woodward at the New York Comic Con in Manhattan, October 10, 2010.
- Areas: Penciller, Inker, Colourist
- Notable works: Fallen Angel

James Kenneth Woodward, known professionally as J. K. Woodward, is a comic book artist known for illustrating the monthly series Fallen Angel, published by IDW Publishing. Woodward has employed painting, digital assistance, as well as the more traditional pencil-and-ink and CMYK color method in his work.

== Early life ==
James Kenneth Woodward was born in the Northeast United States.

== Career ==
Woodward considered either a career as a rock musician or artist. He ultimately chose the latter and moved to Los Angeles, where he spent some years experimenting with his artistic style. He subsequently followed the example of one of his idols, David Bowie, and moved to Germany, where he went into self-publishing, producing a comic book composed of his expressionist paintings called Flesh Angels. He followed this up with an anthology comedic series called These Things Happen.

He then relocated to Desert Hot Springs, California, where he collaborated with A. David Lewis on the independent comic book Mortal Coils, and with Michael Colbert on the Digital Webbing Presents series Crazy Mary, for which he continues to do covers. Crazy Mary was noticed by IDW Publishing, which offered him the job of illustrating a CSI: NY miniseries. He subsequently illustrated a story in Boom! Studios' Zombie Tales. When Peter David moved his series, Fallen Angel to IDW, Woodward was chosen as the regular artist.

His painted work eventually caught the attention of Marvel editor, Mike Marts, who hired him to illustrate X-Men Origins: The Beast, which was released September 2008.

== Personal life ==
After relocating from Desert Hot Springs to Long Beach, California, Woodward moved to Long Island City in Queens, New York.

In October 2012, Woodward and his wife lost their home and almost all of their belongings to Hurricane Sandy. He put his original artwork for the Star Trek: The Next Generation/Doctor Who: Assimilation miniseries up for sale in order to raise funds to recover.

== Bibliography ==
Cover to Fallen Angel #9 (September 2006) by Woodward.

- Star Trek: The Next Generation/Doctor Who: Assimilation^{2} – issue 8 of 8 (IDW); December 2012
- Star Trek: The Next Generation/Doctor Who: Assimilation^{2} – issue 7 of 8 (IDW); November 2012
- Star Trek: The Next Generation/Doctor Who: Assimilation^{2} – issue 6 of 8 (IDW); October 2012
- Star Trek: The Next Generation/Doctor Who: Assimilation^{2} – issue 5 of 8 (IDW); September 2012
- Star Trek: The Next Generation/Doctor Who: Assimilation^{2} – issue 4 of 8 (IDW); August 2012
- Star Trek: The Next Generation/Doctor Who: Assimilation^{2} – issue 3 of 8 (IDW); July 2012
- Star Trek: The Next Generation/Doctor Who: Assimilation^{2} – issue 2 of 8 (IDW); June 2012
- Star Trek: The Next Generation/Doctor Who: Assimilation^{2} – issue 1 of 8 (IDW); May 2012
- Star Trek: Captain's Log – Pike (IDW); September 2010
- Belladonna – graphic novel (IDW); February 2010
- Weekly World News #1 cover-retail incentive (IDW); January 2010
- Star Trek: Alien Spotlight – 4000 Throats (IDW); April 2009
- More Digressions-paperback cover (Mad Norwegian Press); March 2009
- Rogue Dragon-paperback cover (IDW); February 2009
- Star Trek: The Last Generation #3 – Cover (IDW); December 2008
- Necronomicon #4 – Cover (BOOM! Studios); November 2008
- Fall of Cthulhu: God Wars #2 – Cover (Boom! Studios); November 2200;
- Star Trek: The Last Generation #2 – Cover (IDW); November 2008
- Necronomicon #3 – Cover (BOOM! Studios); October 2008
- Fall of Cthulhu: God Wars #1 – Cover (BOOM! Studios); October 2008
- Star Trek: The Last Generation #1 – Cover (IDW); October 2008
- The Rising #2 – Cover (BOOM! Studios); October 2008
- Necronomicon #2 – Cover (BOOM! Studios); September 2008
- X-Men Origins: The Beast (Marvel Comics)
- The Rising #1 – Cover (BOOM! Studios)
- Fallen Angel #29 (IDW); August 2008
- Necronomicon #1 – Cover (BOOM! Studios); August 2008
- Star Trek: New Frontier #2 – retailer incentive cover (IDW); April 2008
- Negative Burn #12; July 2007
- CSI: Crime Scene Investigation: Dying in the Gutters #1 – Cover (IDW); August 2006
- CSI: NY – Bloody Murder #5 – 'Chapter Five—Curtain Call' (IDW); November 2005
- CSI: NY – Bloody Murder #3 – Chapter Three: Creatures of the Night (IDW); September 2005
- CSI: NY – Bloody Murder #4 – Chapter Four: Blood Tales (IDW); September 2005
- CSI: NY – Bloody Murder #2 – Chapter Two: Where Wolf? (IDW); August 2005
- Bits and Pieces #2 (Ronin Studios); August 2005
- CSI: NY – Bloody Murder #1 – Chapter One: Beast Moon (IDW); July 2005
- Digital Webbing Presents #23 – "Damage Control"/"Crazy Mary" (DWP), May 2005
- Zombie Tales #1 (BOOM! Studios); April 2005
- Digital Webbing Presents #21 – "Zombie Tales" (DWP); March 2005
- Digital Webbing Presents #16 – "Crazy Mary" (DWP); July 2004
- Mortal Coils – TPB (Caption Box); July 2004
- The Foot Soldiers TPB – Volume 2; March 2002
- Fly Boys #1; November 1999
- Art for Kill Shakespeare: The Board Game
