= Longest Night =

Longest Night, The Longest Night or The Longest Nite may refer to:

- Winter solstice, the day in December (Northern Hemisphere) and June (Southern Hemisphere) with the longest night of the year
- Longest Night Service or Blue Christmas, a Western Christian tradition marking the December winter solstice

== Film and television ==
=== Films ===
- The Longest Night (1936 film), an American film directed by Errol Taggart
- The Longest Night (1965 film), a Hong Kong film featuring Betty Loh Ti
- The Longest Night (1972 film), an American television film
- The Longest Night (1983 film), a Taiwanese film featuring Chin Han
- The Longest Night (1991 film), a Spanish film directed by José Luis García Sánchez
- The Longest Nite, a 1998 Hong Kong film by Patrick Yau and Johnnie To
- The Longest Night (2019 film), an Ecuadorian film directed by Gabriela Calvache

=== Television episodes ===
- "The Longest Night", a 1962 episode of Straightaway
- "The Longest Night", a 1982 episode of Keep It in the Family (1980)
- "The Longest Night", a 1986 episode of Knots Landing
- "The Longest Night" (Only Fools and Horses), a 1986 episode
- "The Longest Night", a 1997 episode of The Secret World of Santa Claus
- "The Longest Night", a 2005 episode of ReGenesis
- "The Longest Night", a 2010 episode of Chase (2010)
- "The Longest Night", a 2010 episode of Criminal Minds season 6
- "The Longest Night", a 2014 episode of Taxi Brooklyn
- "The Longest Night", a 2017 episode of Go Fighting
- "The Longest Night", a 2020 episode of 101 Dalmatian Street
- "The Longest Night", a 2026 episode of Extracted

== Literature ==
- The Longest Night, a 1936 novel by Cortland Fitzsimmons
- My Longest Night, a 1981 biography by Geneviève Duboscq
- The Longest Night, a 1985 novel by J. N. Williamson
- The Longest Night (Angel novel), a 2002 novel based on the television series Angel
- X-Factor volume 1: The Longest Night, a 2005 comic book storyline by Peter David

== Music ==
- "The Longest Night" (song), by the Bee Gees, 1987
- "Longest Night", a song by Brian Cadd from White on White, 1976
- "The Longest Night", a song by Michelle Wright from Michelle Wright, 1990

== Games ==
- Longest Night (video game), a 2013 companion game of the video game Night in the Woods
- The Witchfire Trilogy Book One: The Longest Night, a 2001 role-playing game adventure started in the Iron Kingdoms setting

== Other ==
- UNIT: The Longest Night, a Doctor Who audio drama

== See also ==
- Night (disambiguation)
