= Shi (character) =

- Shi

Publication information
- Publisher: Crusade Comics; Avatar Press; Dark Horse Comics
- First appearance: Razor Annual #1 (December 1993)
- Created by: William Tucci

In-story information
- Alter ego: Ana Ishikawa
- Abilities: Skilled martial artist

Shi (Ana Ishikawa) is a comic book character created by writer/illustrator William Tucci. The character Shi first appeared in Razor Annual #1 (December 1993), and has appeared in numerous books by various publishers ever since, most notably Tucci's own Crusade Comics and the Image Universe.

The comic book character Shi is a young woman of Japanese and American descent trained as a sohei warrior monk, who struggles to reconcile her Japanese grandfather's martial training with her American mother's Christian teachings. Japanese culture and spiritual themes are prominent, recurring motifs in storylines featuring her, especially as they pertain to this conflict.

The word shi literally translates to death (死) in Japanese, and Shi's signature weapon is the naginata.

== Fictional character biography ==
Ana's father, Shiro, was a Japanese warrior; her mother, Catherine, is an American Catholic missionary. As a child, Ana witnessed the brutal murder of her father and brother at the hands of Masahiro Arashi, an upstart yakuza thug. Following this horrifying incident, Ana was consequently taken away and raised by her grandfather Yoshitora, amongst the sacred temples of Kyoto. Yoshitora secretly trained Ana in the ways of the sohei (warrior monks of feudal Japan), so that she could seek out Arashi and avenge the deaths of her father and brother.

Arashi wanted to impress the leaders of the Osaka crime syndicate and left a calling card with every murder he committed—a simple coin engraved with the kanji for death; shi. Whilst holding onto the coins left with the bodies of her dead father and brother, Ana developed a vengeful obsession. Ana swore revenge on the yakuza, and set out to become one of the deadliest assassins in the world.

In order to disguise herself, Ana painted her face white to resemble Tora No Shi (also known as Tiger of Death), a legendary female warrior of medieval Japan. Ana acquired the name Shi because of her ferocity and ruthlessness.

However, Ana was deeply affected by her mother's Catholic teachings; she soon faced a dilemma between her programmed mission of revenge and the Christian faith she secretly harbored. Once her parents' killer, Arashi, was sent to prison, Ana renounced killing and became the manager of an art gallery in New York. From time to time, she still takes on her Shi personality if necessary.

Even with the duality that rages in Ana's soul, she will not allow herself to succumb to the death demon that terrorizes her. In the end, it is Ana's faith and the ethereal visions of her sohei ancestors that shepherd her along the way of the warrior.

== Powers and abilities ==
Ana was trained by her grandfather in the ways of the sohei. As such, she is a skilled martial artist and swordswoman, the naginata being her weapon of choice.

== Merchandise ==
Through William Tucci's Crusade Fine Arts, Shi has been printed in four languages.

A series of limited edition 1/6 scale figures was released by Executive Replicas in 2017.

== Tora no Shi ==
In the first series Shi: the Way of the Warrior, Ana based her look on "Tora no Shi", Yuri Ishikawa, a famous female ancestor of hers from feudal Japan, who wore a similar outfit. That character starred in her own miniseries Shi: Tora no Shi and Avatar Press' Shi: Poisoned Paradise. The first series depicted her conflict with Musashi Miyamoto, and the second centered upon her battle with Ieyasu Tokugawa during Yuri's time with the Japanese Christian resistance.

== Shi: Return of the Warrior, Shi: Haikyo, and Shi:Sakura ==
In January 2021, Tucci began a crowdfunding campaign on Kickstarter in order to produce Shi: Haikyo, a 64-page sequel to Shi: Return of the Warrior that sees Ana forced to ally herself with her archenemy, Masahiro Arashi, in order to save her teenage daughter Hotaru, who has been kidnapped by a "Shi" copycat killer. Another sequel features Ana traveling to Japan to find her biological mother.

== Film adaptation ==
In 1997, there were plans to make a motion picture based on Shi, with Tia Carrere as Shi/Ana Ishikawa and Tucci writing the script. In 2002, the movie was optioned by producer Mimi Polk Gitlin with Tucci still on the script but with Kevin Bernhardt co-writing it and with no lead role defined.

== Publications ==
=== Primary ===
- Shi: The Way of the Warrior #1–12 (1994–1997)
- Shi vs. Tomoe
  - Tomoe #1–3 (drawn by Amanda Conner)
- Shi: Senryaku #1-3 (1995)
- Shi: Kaidan (1996)
- Manga Shi 2000 #1-3 (1997)
- Shi: Nightstalkers (1997)
- Shi: East Wind Rain (1997)
- Shi: Rekishi #1-2 (1997)
- Shi: Heaven & Earth (a.k.a. Tora No Shi) #1–4 (1997)
- Shi: The Series #1-13 (1997-1998)
- Shi: Black, White and Red #1-2 (1998)
- Shi: 5th Anniversary Special (1999)
- Shi: Zero (2000)
- Shi: Year of the Dragon #0-3 (2000)
- Shi: Akai (2001)
- Shi: Through the Ashes (2001, special issue made after 9/11)
- Shi: Poisoned Paradise #0–2 (with Karl Waller, Avatar Press, 2002)
- Shi: The Illustrated Warrior #1-7 (2002-2003)
- Shi: Sempo (4-issue miniseries, 2003, Avatar Press)
- Shi: Ju-Nen (4-issue miniseries, 2004–2005; 104 page trade paperback, Dark Horse Comics, 2006, ISBN 1-59307-451-4)
- Definitive Shi: The Essential Warrior Vol. 1 (576 pages, Crusade Fine Arts, 2006)
- Shi: Return of the Warrior (graphic novel, 2020)
- Shi: Haikyo (graphic novel, 2021)

=== Crossover ===
- Avengelyne/Shi
- Image comics/GEN 13 - Number 13C
- Cyblade/Shi and Shi/Cyblade (The Battle for Independents) (1995)
- Daredevil/Shi and Shi/Daredevil (1997)
- Fallen Angel (IDW)/Shi (Fallen Angel Vol. 2 Nos. 17–19)
- Grifter/Shi: Final Rites #1–2 (1996)
- Razor & Shi Special (1994)
- Lethargic Comics #12 (1994)
- Shi/Vampirella
- Vampirella/Shi
- Vampirella #7–9
- Lady Death/Shi #0–2
- Wolverine/Shi: Dark Night of Judgment (2000)
- Tenth Muse/Shi: Bluewater One Shot (2007)
- Jetta/Shi: Arrow Of Destiny (2008)
