= Jetta: Tales of the Toshigawa =

Cover of Jetta: Tales of the Toshigawa - Rain, Volume 2

Jetta: Tales of the Toshigawa is a comic book created by Martheus Wade and Janet Wade, with Kevin Williams as editor.

== Overview ==
The story is about a young Japanese woman, born into a ninja clan, that is trapped between her wishes and her destiny. The story delves into Japanese culture and lore, while also maintaining all of the modernities of the 21st Century, which is when the story takes place.

The series is comparable in many ways to the comic Shi as both are considered to be in the genre, "bad girl comics". Likewise both characters are of Asian heritage. Unlike Shi, the duality of the character Jetta is not caused by conflict of religion or philosophies as much as her own fight to understand truth and her fight against her destiny as the Chosen One of the Toshigawa clan.

== Fictional character biography ==
Shianndrea (Jetta) is a young Japanese woman brought up into the Toshigawa ninja clan. In its history, the clan had a severe struggle with the Knave, an organization bent on bringing evil together to unite the world, and at the end of that struggle the Knave had been defeated. However, legend has foretold that one day a descendant of Yamoto Toshigawa, who first subdued the Knave, will be destined to bring down the Knave as they rise up once again. When Jetta and her clan are attacked by her father and former Toshigawa clan leader Terminus, now leading the Knave, she realizes the prophecy was not meant for her father but for herself. Divided now between her love of a father she once knew, her loyalty towards her clan, and her own needs and wants, Jetta discovers that fighting her own destiny may be harder than answering to her destiny.

== Bibliography ==
- Jetta: Tales of the Toshigawa – Last Chances Vol. #0 (Spring. 2004)
- Jetta: Tales of the Toshigawa – Defiance Vol. #1 (Spring 2005)
- Jetta: Tales of the Toshigawa – Rain Vol. #2 (Spring 2006)
- Jetta: Tales of the Toshigawa - Crucible (Fall 2006)
- Jetta: Tales of the Toshigawa - Revelations Vol. #3 (Summer 2007)
- Jetta/Shi - Arrow of Destiny (2008)
- Jetta: Tales of the Toshigawa - Full Circle Vol. #4 (Spring 2011)
- Turra: Gun Angel (drawn by Andrew Chandler)
