= Sachs and Violens =

American comic book

Sachs & Violens
- Cover to Sachs & Violens #1 (November 1993), art by George Pérez.

Publication information
- Publisher: Marvel Comics
- Format: Miniseries
- Genre: Superhero
- Publication date: November 1993 – July 1994
- No. of issues: 4
- Main character(s): Sachs; Violens

Creative team
- Created by: Peter David; George Pérez
- Written by: Peter David
- Artist: George Pérez

Collected editions
- Sachs and Violens: ISBN 1-4012-1050-3

Sachs & Violens is an American comic book created by writer Peter David and co-developed with artist George Pérez. This four-issue miniseries was published from 1993 to 1994 by Marvel Comics's Epic Comics imprint, in which creators retained the rights. The series was part of the imprint's Heavy Hitters line, and featured a greater amount of violence and adult situations compared with mainstream comic books of the time, and as such was recommended for mature readers.

The titular duo later appeared as supporting characters in David's other creator-owned series, Fallen Angel.

== Publication history ==
Sachs & Violens is an American comic book four-issue miniseries published from November 1993 to July 1994 by Marvel Comics's Epic Comics imprint, in which creators retained the rights. It was created by writer Peter David and co-developed with artist George Pérez. The series was part of the imprint's Heavy Hitters line, which also included Lawdog, Terrarists, Brats Bizarre and Feud.

== Plot and characters ==
Juanita "J.J." Sachs is a model who does softcore pornography photo shoots for her friend Ernie "Violens" Schultz, a former Vietnam War photojournalist. After another of her friends is viciously murdered in a snuff photo shoot, the two of them track down the people responsible and, in the process, become lovers and uncover an underworld of depravity, ending in a violent showdown in Mardi Gras.

Sachs and Violens appeared as supporting characters in Peter David's other creator-owned title, Fallen Angel. They first appeared in the second volume of the series, which was published by IDW Publishing, in which they arrive in the series' setting of Bete Noire, a mysterious city of Biblical origin inhabited by various characters of dubious character and motives. They become allies of the series' titular heroine, Liandra, and continue to appear in the series' third volume, by the same publisher, which debuted in August 2009.

== Collected edition ==
In December 2006, the miniseries was collected as Sachs and Violens, a 128-page trade paperback by DC Comics. In November 2016, the miniseries was again collected as Sachs and Violens, this time by IDW.

== Merchandising ==
In August 2009, Black Phoenix Alchemy Lab, a company that produces comic book-themed perfumes, debuted "Sachs & Violens", based on the titular comic book characters. Proceeds from sales of the scent went to the Hero Initiative, a non-profit organization dedicated to helping comic book creators in need of health, medical, and quality-of-life assistance.
