= Knight Life =

Fantasy novel by Peter David

- Original 1987 edition
- Author: Peter David
- Cover artist: Hiro Kimura
- Language: English
- Genre: Fantasy
- Publisher: Ace Books
- Publication date: 1987 and special edition in 2002
- Publication place: United States
- Media type: Print (hardback & paperback)
- Pages: 343 (paperback special edition)
- ISBN: 0-441-01077-6 (paperback special edition)
- OCLC: 52543434
- Followed by: One Knight Only

Knight Life (ISBN 0-441-01077-6), is an Arthurian fantasy novel by American writer Peter David. The book was first published in 1987, and an expanded, updated edition of the book was published by Ace Books in 2002.

== Plot summary ==
(The following summary is based on the 2002 rewrite.)

In a rundown apartment in New Jersey, Morgan Le Fay has finally decided to end her own life. Although kept immortal by magic, she has become apathetic, elderly, and corpulent, and sees no point in continuing with her life. Before cutting her wrist with a steak knife, she decides to look in on her old nemesis, Merlin's prison, one last time, and is surprised to see that he has escaped. Given a reason to live again, she laughs triumphantly.

In Manhattan, King Arthur appears on the streets in full medieval armor, which he quickly divests in favor of a tailored suit (thanks to an American Express card that appears in his pocket by magic). He then walks into Central Park, where the Lady of the Lake rises from the pond and gives him Excalibur.

Setting up an office under the name "Arthur Penn" (short for Pendragon), Arthur reunites with Merlin, who advises him that the world needs a leader like him, so Arthur decides to enter politics, beginning with announcing his candidacy for Mayor of New York City. As he is setting up his campaign headquarters, he hires the first applicant for an executive secretary, Gwen DeVere Queen, despite Merlin's disapproval. Arthur also "acquires," as hangers-on, two petty thugs, Buddy and Elvis, who crossed his path in Central Park and became awed by him.

After collecting the requisite number of signatures to run as an independent candidate, Arthur begins his campaign with impromptu speeches on street corners in New York, where his medieval, yet chivalric views fascinate random passers-by. His campaign alarms his illegitimate son Modred, who is immortal thanks to his mother Morgan's sorcery, but now works as a campaign manager for the Republican mayoral candidate.

== Two versions ==
The original version of the book sold decently, but was not a runaway best seller. During his efforts to bring the book to the big screen, Peter David grew more and more dissatisfied with what he considered to be an amateur novel. He was also concerned with how dated the story seemed, with anachronisms such as an office filled with clattering typewriters and an almost non-existent Republican presence in New York City mayoral politics. Because he had updated and expanded the story when writing a screenplay version of it during one of the numerous times it was optioned to be adapted into a film, he decided to rewrite the novel, incorporating aspects from the screenplay version, and bringing it more into line with how his writing style developed over the years. Whereas the original edition contained 65,000 words, the 2002 edition contains 95,000.

== Characters ==
- Arthur Pendragon/Arthur Penn
- Merlin
- Percival
- Gwen DeVere Queen
- Morgan Le Fay
- Modred/Moe Dreskin
- Lance Benson
- Miss Basil
- Buddy
- Elvis
- Bernard "Bernie" Keating
- Kent Taylor
- Ronnie Cordoba

== Influences ==
Knight Life is influenced by numerous Arthurian literary works, including the following:

- Le Morte d'Arthur by Sir Thomas Malory
- The Once and Future King by T.H. White
- The Book of Merlyn by T.H. White
- The Last Enchantment (and other assorted titles) by Mary Stewart
- Tales of King Arthur by John Steinbeck
- Arthur Rex by Thomas Berger

== Film ==
The novel was optioned to be adapted into a film several times, for which Peter David wrote a screenplay version of the story, but to date it has never been brought forward into production.

== Sequels ==
The 2002 edition of the book was followed by two sequels, One Knight Only in 2003, and Fall of Knight in 2006.

== Reception ==
Lynn Bryant reviewed Knight Life in Space Gamer/Fantasy Gamer No. 79. Bryant commented that "The only problem with reading Knight Life is that afterward, you wish that it could really happen. An enjoyable, quick read that will make you laugh out loud."

== Reviews ==
- Review by Tanya Gardiner-Scott (1987) in Fantasy Review, June 1987
- Review by Don D'Ammassa (1987) in Science Fiction Chronicle, #95 August 1987
- Review by John C. Bunnell (1987) in Dragon Magazine, September 1987
