= Fallen Angel (comics) =

American comic book heroine

- Textless cover to Fallen Angel #4. Art by Brian Stelfreeze.

Publication information
- Publisher: DC Comics (2003–2005); IDW Publishing (2005–2008)
- Schedule: Monthly
- Format: Ongoing series
- Main character: Liandra

Creative team
- Created by: Peter David & David López
- Written by: Peter David
- Artist: J. K. Woodward (IDW series)
- Penciller: David López (DC series)
- Inker: Fernando Blanco (DC series)
- Colorist: Nathan Eyring (DC series)

Collected editions
- Fallen Angel: ISBN 1-4012-0225-X
- Down To Earth: ISBN 1401212689
- To Serve in Heaven: ISBN 1933239778
- To Rule in Hell: ISBN 1600100732
- Back in Noire: ISBN 1600100996
- Heroine Addiction: ISBN 1600103014
- Red Horse Riding: ISBN 1600103014
- Cities of Light and Dark: ISBN 1600103502

Fallen Angel is an American fictional comic book heroine created and owned by writer Peter David and artist David López, who appeared in her own self-titled monthly series. The series was originally published by DC Comics from July 2003 until it was canceled with issue #20 in May 2005 due to low sales. A second series, published through IDW Publishing, began in December 2005 and ran for 33 issues. It was followed by two mini-series, Fallen Angel: Reborn and Fallen Angel: Return of the Son, also published by IDW Publishing.

While not completely without humor, it is a very dark book with morally ambiguous characters. It was also one of the few "mature readers" books that DC published outside of its Vertigo imprint and was created to serve as a "bridge" between the general-audience DC titles and its Vertigo titles.

The first series was illustrated in the typical pen-and-ink method of the comic book industry by penciller David López and inker Fernando Blanco. The first five-issue arc of the second series was painted by J. K. Woodward, though both Woodward and guest artists have utilized the traditional pen-and-ink method since then.

== Publication history ==
=== DC Comics ===
Launched by DC comics in 2003, the book reportedly suffered from low sales by its eleventh issue. When asked why this might be, Peter David suggested that the comics industry as a whole is intolerant of new ideas, and that a sizable segment of comic buyers prefer to wait for a monthly comic to be collected into trade paperbacks, driving down monthly sales.

In August 2004, in response to complaints that some retailers weren't stocking copies of Fallen Angel for interested fans to purchase, David announced that he would be producing a limited-edition autographed bookplate which could be attached to the Fallen Angel trade paperback, which he would send to both interested retailers and fans.

In January 2005, David confirmed that he had been told Fallen Angel would not continue past issue #20, despite a reportedly successful promotional effort. Sales on the title were reported to be around 11,000 copies, about 4000 short of what DC required for the title to be profitable.

=== IDW Publishing ===
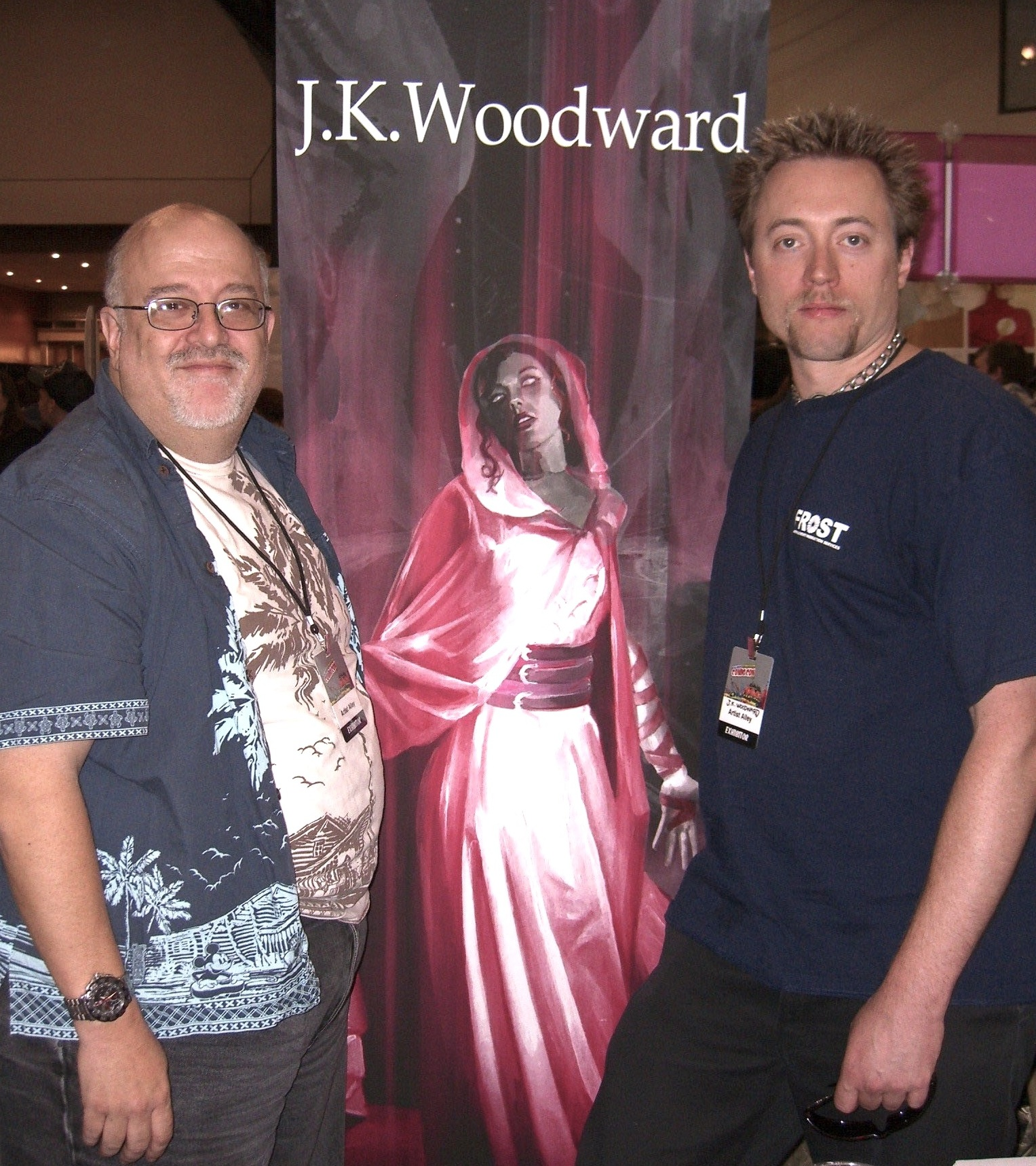
Peter David and J.K. Woodward in front of Woodward's illustration of Lee at the New York Comic Con, October 10, 2010.

At the 2005 WizardWorld: Philadelphia convention, DC Comics representative Bob Wayne stated that Peter David had decided to move Fallen Angel to IDW Publishing. This prompted a response from David himself, who confirmed the news, but cautioned that the final contracts were not yet signed. Several days later, David and IDW Editor in Chief Chris Ryall discussed the move in an interview, in which they revealed that while López retained his ownership in the property, he would not be the artist on the new series. Fallen Angel resumed publication as a five-issue limited series, which was expanded to a regular monthly series due to high sales.

Although López provided some of the covers, the bulk of the interior art, in the early stages of the series, was provided by J. K. Woodward. Other artists like Kristian Donaldson also did short runs.

The final issue of the second volume, which was published on January 21, 2009, saw the conclusion of that volume's Moloch storyline, with God accepting Liandra back into heaven. The series was relaunched in July 2009 as Fallen Angel: Reborn, a four-issue mini-series featuring the character Illyria from Joss Whedon's Buffyverse. A second four-issue mini-series, titled Fallen Angel: Return of the Son, was launched in January 2011.

== Premise ==
The story focuses on Lee (also known as the Fallen Angel) who is arguably a superheroine residing in the city of Bete Noire. The city is completely riddled with corruption, and supernatural characters who emerge at night, and is managed by the Magistrate, who answers to a mysterious organization. Lee is possibly the only force for justice in the city.

The city of Bete Noire is as much a character as a setting. It has been revealed to be the Biblical city of Enoch. During the day the city has no crime at all, but at night it is a haven for crime and corruption. Known as "the city that shapes the world", some say that the events that happen in the city influence major global events. Bete Noire is often said to possess a sentience of its own; the city decides who enters and leaves. When entering and exiting Bete Noire, Lee experiences the city as simply appearing or vanishing around a deserted road. Time passes differently in Bete Noire than it does outside of it. People born and raised in the city appear to age normally, but outsiders who come to live in it either age more slowly or experience a total cessation of aging.

Bete Noire is run by an organization known as The Hierarchy. Lee has said that even God has no dominion over Bete Noire; it is run exclusively by The Hierarchy. The Hierarchy, in turn, typically exerts its will through the city's Magistrate. The Magistrate, a direct descendant of Cain, manages the city. The position of Magistrate is passed from firstborn son to firstborn son by means of a mystical ritual performed on or after the son's eighteenth birthday. The Magistrate constantly hears the voices of the city and is plagued by visions. This perception causes the Magistrate excruciating pain, and he must learn to tolerate and ignore it. All Magistrates bear the mark of Cain, which renders them effectively immortal and impervious to harm. Magistrates are even able to mentally control the actions of those trying to do them harm. However, it appears that both former Magistrates and agents of the Hierarchy are able to hurt, and possibly even kill, a Magistrate. After passing the duties of Magistrate on to his firstborn son, Dr. Juris attempted to leave the city and experienced a fatal aging effect after he crossed the city limits. During his tenure, a Magistrate is granted one "day off" per year, during which he is permitted to leave the city.

=== Characters ===
==== Liandra ====
Liandra leads a joyous life as a guardian angel—"The Boss's favorite"—until one of her charges, a girl named Holly, develops the ability to see her. They develop a close bond, and when Holly is abducted and murdered, Liandra is devastated. The murderer is acquitted on a technicality, and Liandra kills him. As a result, Liandra is stripped of her wings and cast down to Earth.

She eventually makes her way to Bete Noire, adopting the name "Lee". She makes her base of operations in a bar called Furors. People come to her seeking her help and if she believes that they have been wronged, she helps them; however, if she thinks they deserve their fate, not only might she refuse to help them, she might also help to further their destruction. By day, she works as a physical education teacher at a girls' school, until it is destroyed by Slate. She is a very enigmatic person whose actions often seem contradictory; in one issue she tortures Black Mariah, and shortly thereafter she saves her life. For some time, she maintains a sexual relationship with Bete Noire's Magistrate, Doctor Juris, who in many ways is her counterpart in the city. She eventually gives birth to his son, Jude, and secretly leaves him in the care of an orphanage. Lee is not the first to serve as "protector" of Bete Noire; she has had more than one predecessor.

Lee has several superhuman abilities, including immense physical strength, the ability to leap large distances, and to project some type of mystical energy from her body, often from her eyes. Her invulnerability is tied to her level of concentration, and she can be harmed if extremely fatigued or distracted. She has also stated that she has a superhuman sense of direction. Since being cast down, she cannot touch Earth's soil, and so floats just above the ground when barefoot. Because of the nature of time in Bete Noire, Lee, who was not born in the city, ages more slowly than Bete Noire native-borns, but has yet experienced some aging between the first and second volumes of the series because she spends half her time outside the city. When in the city, she physically appears to be the equivalent of a twenty-five-year-old human woman, but outside the city, appears to be a woman in her late 40s.

==== Doctor Juris ====
The Magistrate and "manager" of Bete Noire, Juris answers to a mysterious group called the Hierarchy. He is Lee's prime antagonist throughout the first series and, strangely enough, her lover. He, like all other Magistrates, is a descendant of Cain. In the second series, twenty years after the events of the first, he is married to an Asian woman named Xia. He tries to pass on guardianship of Bete Noire to his son Jubal at the stroke of midnight on Jubal's eighteenth birthday, but when the ritual fails, he realizes that Jubal is not his firstborn son, which leads him to discover that he has a twenty-year-old son, Jude, by Lee. Jude soon tracks him down in Bete Noire, however, and he is able to pass his legacy to his son. When Juris tries to leave Bete Noire after this, he rapidly ages and dies.

==== Jude ====
Jude is Lee and Juris' son, and older half-brother to Jubal. He first appears as an infant (with tiny emerging wings on his back) at the end of the first series, when Lee leaves him at an orphanage shortly after his birth. As an infant, his wings are torn off by Malachi, disguised as a dog. Twenty years later, Jude is a young priest. After a visit from Slate, he seeks out Bete Noire and Juris. He agrees to become the new Magistrate, believing that he can act as a force for good. As Magistrate, he struggles to do what he believes is right despite the interference of the Hierarchy and the corrupting influence of his power. After losing the role of Magistrate, he turns his back on his mother and attempts to gain his power back from her.

==== Malachi ====
An angel himself, Malachi is Liandra's mentor and lover until her exile to Earth. Many years later, Malachi appears to Lee and claims that "The Boss" is offering her a chance to regain her wings and return to angelhood. However, he later reveals to her that he has been granted a "transfer" by God, and is now working for the Hierarchy. He also represents the Hierarchy to Jude, informing him when the Hierarchy disapproves of his actions as Magistrate. Malachi secretly approaches Jubal, and offers to help him become the next Magistrate of Bete Noire. Malachi is also Black Mariah's lover.

Unlike Lee, Malachi has retained the full scope of his angelic powers, which include the ability to survive indefinitely without breathing.

==== Jubal ====
Jubal is Juris' eighteen-year-old son by Xia, half-brother to Jude. He has spent his life trying to please his father, and bears hatred towards Jude when Juris realizes that it is Jude to whom he must pass on management of Bete Noire. He appears to have an intimate relationship with his mother, Xia.

==== Xia ====
Xia is Juris's wife by the time of the second series, and mother to Jubal. An Asian woman, Xia is not her real name, but one that Juris picked for her, which means "glow of the sunrise". After Jude becomes Magistrate, Xia attempts to become close to him, and even tries to seduce him. When these efforts fail, she concentrates on manipulating Jude, with the eventual goal of leading him to his own destruction, which Xia believes will lead to Jubal becoming the next Magistrate.

==== Black Mariah ====
Black Mariah is a witch with the power to suck life out of anyone she touches. Her role in the city is to gather information worldwide for the Magistrate. Mariah lives in fear of her brother Wilde, who has stolen her death from the ether and can use it to kill her at any time; until then, Mariah is immortal. Shortly after Lee's arrival in Bete Noire, she destroys Mariah's white slavery ring and drives her out of town. Upon her return, she offers to give Lee a piece of The Shard—a fragment of Christ's crucifix. Lee drugs and tortures Mariah for information, but later helps her recover her death from Wilde. Mariah learns that Doctor Juris was responsible for the death of Shadow Boxer, Mariah's lover, and allies herself with Lee. Twenty years later, she also enters a relationship with Malachi.

==== Shadow Boxer ====
As a child in England, Shadow Boxer is granted the ability to merge with shadows by a member of the Hierarchy. This power allows him to essentially teleport between any two dark areas. He uses this power to rescue his abusive father, who was trapped in a mine, but his father later accuses him of being in league with the Devil. In his rage, Boxer's father attacked his wife, causing her to miscarry her unborn child. Boxer killed his father as retribution. As an adult in Bete Noire, Shadow Boxer acts as Doctor Juris's main enforcer. He is also Black Mariah's lover, as her touch does not harm him. In a battle with Lee, Boxer is led to believe he has caused her to miscarry. Stricken with guilt, he confesses to Dr. Juris, who kills him.

==== Asia Minor ====
Living in a mausoleum in a graveyard, Asia Minor is an Asian drug lord who for various reasons often finds himself aiding Lee. He speaks in the broken English stereotypical of Asian immigrants, though it has been established that this is a facade, in that he is capable of speaking perfect English. He was once visited by the ghost of a girl named Tiffany, a girl who had been murdered by a junkie addicted to drugs supplied by Asia, and since then has been cursed with the ability to help only others, but never himself. Asia supplies the Magistrate with drugs that suppress the constant voices and visions that accompany the position.

==== Slate ====
Slate acts as Bete Noire's Chief Examiner, and is considered the city's best detective. Slate is also the closest thing to a police officer in the city. Before coming to Bete Noire, Slate was an officer in a northwestern African city called Maristan, which he says was even more corrupt than Bete Noire, until it was destroyed by a demon and vanished from human memory.

==== Sachs and Violens ====
Peter David brought two previously published characters, Sachs and Violens, into Fallen Angel in issue #19 of the DC Comics series. Co-owned by David and artist George Pérez, the characters had previously appeared in their own limited series from Marvel Comics's Epic imprint in 1993. Although the characters were owned by the creators, David says their appearance in Fallen Angel nearly didn't happen due to the legal costs involved. Co-creator George Pérez contributed covers to these issues. Sachs and Violens remained cast members in the series after it transferred to IDW Publishing. Juanita "J.J." Sachs and Ernie "Violens" Shultz come to Bete Noire to find and destroy a child pornography ring. They decide to remain in the city, and Violens becomes the city's Chief Enforcer after the death of Shadow Boxer. Sachs is the sister of Bumper Ruggs, the manager of a local brothel.

==== Dolf ====
The owner of Furor's, a Bete Noire bar in which violence is prohibited. Dolf allows Lee to use Furors as a base of operations, and is indeed quite protective of her, christening her "The Fallen Angel". It is implied that Dolf may be Adolf Hitler; in addition to the name of his bar's similarity to Hitler's title of Führer, Dolf claims that he has been a painter, a writer, "dabbled" in politics, and made enemies. He also owns a World War II-era Walther P38 pistol. When asked if he is a collector, Dolf again responds, "I dabble". Dolf has also indicated that he considers dark skin to be an indicator of "an inferior creature, barely above an animal...certainly not human".

==== Guest stars ====
Issues 17 through 19 of the second series feature an appearance by Billy Tucci's Shi. Issue #17 was published as a flip-book, with one following Lee, and the other half telling the same story from Shi's perspective.

Illyria from Joss Whedon's Angel appeared in a four-issue crossover with Fallen Angel. According to Peter David, "the story is set early in Illyria's involvement with Angel & Co. Having been deprived of her power by Wesley, she is drawn to Bete Noire as a potential source for not only becoming what she was before, but even achieving her previous status. Remember, what we see of her in Angel is not her true appearance". The collected edition was scheduled for a January 2010 publication.

== Religious themes ==
Fallen Angel includes many references to Christianity and other religions, some of which provide an unusual perspective on faith and worship.

Liandra herself is a former guardian angel who had been employed by God (indeed, she was God's favorite). She states that the role of Guardians is to protect humans they are assigned to by giving them orders; however, the humans merely hear this as a suggestion in their head, and have the free will to heed it or not. Guardians are typically invisible to humans, though there have been exceptions. Lee's son Jude is a Catholic priest.

The city of Bete Noire itself is actually the Biblical city of Enoch, built by Cain and named after his son.

When asked by Jude why evil exists in the world, Liandra explains that God wants to die. She states that humanity was intended to be God's crowning achievement, and was prepared to move on after its creation, but the constant prayers of people on Earth prevent him from being able to do this. For centuries, God has been sending disasters to Earth in the hope that people will stop believing in Him and let Him pass. Peter David acknowledged that this is a somewhat unusual and controversial take on God:

The fun thing is that I ran it past a reform rabbi I encountered at San Diego con and he told me he was reasonably sure he hadn't heard anyone else come up with it before. So I'm pretty confident that the 'truth' the Fallen Angel provides Jude is going to piss off a whole lot of people. Because on the one hand it will come across as pretty blasphemous, but on the other hand, it makes a frightening amount of sense.

Lee states that Hell does not exist, and that a loving God would not subject people to endless torment without the opportunity to learn from the punishment. She also implies that the actual destination of those who believe they will go to Hell is somehow even worse.

Benny, a local pickpocket who also sometimes eats his victims, is the serpent from the Garden of Eden.

Jesus Christ seems to appear to Shi, and guides her towards the town of Yellow Springs, which is revealed to be Yomi, the Japanese realm of the dead.

== Censorship ==
In late September 2008, IDW Publishing received a letter from the Department of Corrections in an unnamed U.S. state, informing them that copies of issues #1 and 2 of Fallen Angel that were mailed to a subscriber incarcerated in their prison were confiscated. The letter explained that the issues contained "material that violates Operating Procedure 803.2, Incoming Publications, and could be detrimental to the security and good order of the institution and the rehabilitation of inmates." Peter David, in a blog entry on his website titled, "Buy Fallen Angel so that criminals don't get their hands on it!", responded to this explanation by saying, "We are SO using this as a pull quote on the next trade paperback."

== Supergirl connection ==
Before the move to IDW, Peter David acknowledged that Fallen Angel was based on ideas he had been unable to use during his time writing Supergirl before it was cancelled, but stopped short of admitting that Lee was, in fact, Linda Lee Danvers (Supergirl). The DC run of the title is consistent with this hypothesis, which would also jibe with the expressed intent to form a "bridge" between DC's general-audience and mature-readers-imprint.

Though David remained coy as to whether the two characters were one and the same during the DC run of the title, after it moved to IDW, David revealed Lee's origin, which clearly showed that Lee was not Danvers. However, Fallen Angel #14 introduced "Lin", who was said to be Lee's "predecessor" in Bete Noire. Lin had recently escaped Limbo, an apparent metaphor for what happened to Danvers after the cancellation of Supergirl. David was more explicit as to whether Lin was Linda Danvers in his December 13, 2006 blog entry, in which he stated:

Any fans of my run on Supergirl—particularly those who are torqued because Linda Danvers was consigned to oblivion in the DCU--must, must, MUST pick up "Fallen Angel" #14 and #15 when they come out next year.

Since David could not explicitly claim that a character owned by DC and a character that he owned were one and the same, he admitted:

Can I say this is Linda Danvers? Of course I can't. However, it's pretty freaking obvious that it is.

Furthermore, in the Fallen Angel Premier Edition hardcover, a bonus story was revealed detailing Malachi's transfer out of God's service. This story portrayed God as being a young boy wearing a baseball cap and holding a metal golf club, similar to Wally the God-Boy from Peter David's run on Supergirl.

== Collected editions ==
Both series have been collected into trade paperbacks.

The DC series:

- Fallen Angel (collects issues #1–6, 144 pages, July 2004, ISBN 1-4012-0225-X)
- Down To Earth (collects issues #7–12, 144 pages, January 2007, ISBN 1-4012-1268-9)

The IDW series:

- To Serve in Heaven (collects issues #1–5, 120 pages, September 2006, ISBN 1-933239-77-8)
- To Serve in Hell (collects issues #6–10, 128 pages, March 2007, ISBN 1-60010-073-2)
- Back In Noire (collects issues #11–16, 149 pages, August 2007, ISBN 1-60010-099-6)
- Heroine Addiction (collects issues #17–21, 128 pages, February 2008, ISBN 1-60010-156-9)
- Red Horse Riding (collects issues #22–26, 146 pages, July 2008, ISBN 1-60010-301-4)
- Cities of Light and Dark (collects issues #27–33, 136 pages, April 2009, ISBN 1-60010-350-2)
- Reborn (collects issues #1–4, 104 pages, January 2010, ISBN 1-60010-586-6)
- Return of the Son (collects issues #1–4, 104 pages, July 2011, ISBN 978-1-60010-975-1)

There are two oversized hardcovers collecting the first twenty-six issues of the IDW run, as well as additional material like the original pitch.

- Fallen Angel: The Premiere Collection (collects issues #1–13, 320 pages, May 2007, ISBN 1-60010-076-7)
- Fallen Angel: The Premiere Collection Volume 2 (collects issues #14–26, 328 pages, July 2009, ISBN 1-60010-446-0)

There are three Omnibus versions of Fallen Angel which collect issues #1 through #20 of the DC series, #1–33 and Reborn #1–4 of the IDW series. All are published by IDW.

- Fallen Angel Omnibus Volume 0 (collects issues #1–20 (DC), 464 pages, July 2010, ISBN 1-60010-674-9)
- Fallen Angel Omnibus Volume 1 (collects issues #1–21 (IDW), 512 pages, March 2009, ISBN 1-60010-382-0)
- Fallen Angel Omnibus Volume 2 (collects issues #22–33 plus Reborn #1–4 (IDW), 360 pages, January 2011, ISBN 1-60010-847-4)
