= Peter David =

American writer (1956–2025)

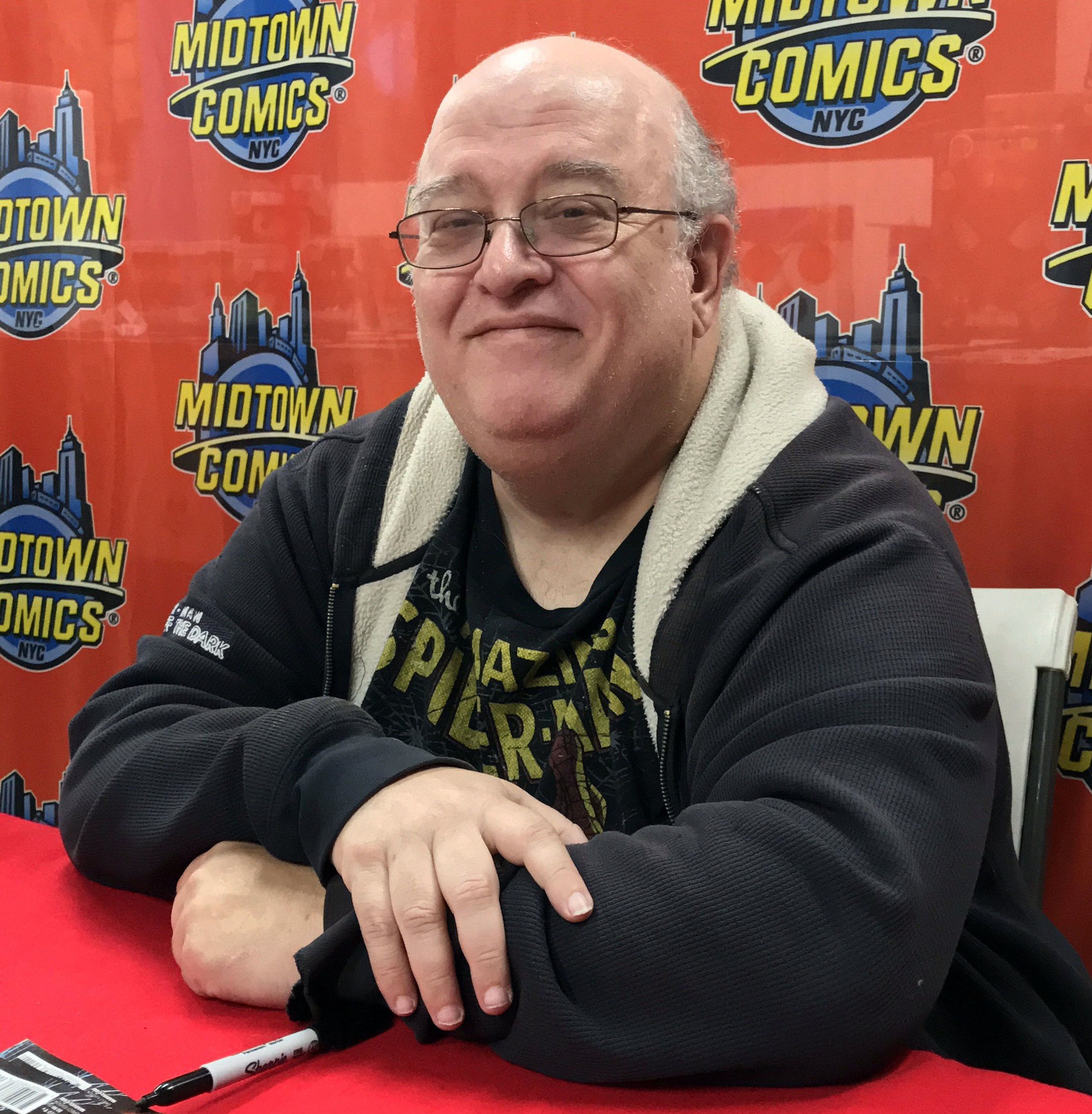
- David at Midtown Comics in Manhattan in 2017
- Born: Peter Allen David; September 23, 1956 Fort Meade, Maryland, U.S.
- Died: May 24, 2025 (aged 68) East Patchogue, New York, U.S.
- Areas: Superhero fiction, science fiction, fantasy
- Pseudonym: David Peters
- Notable works: The Incredible Hulk; X-Factor; Young Justice; Star Trek: New Frontier; Fallen Angel
- Awards: 1992 Eisner Award; 1993 Wizard Fan Award; 1996 Haxtur Award; 2007 Julie Award; 2011 GLAAD Media Award; 2016 Inkpot Award
- Spouses: Myra Kasman (m. 1977; div. 1998) Kathleen O'Shea (m. 2001)
- Children: 4

Signature
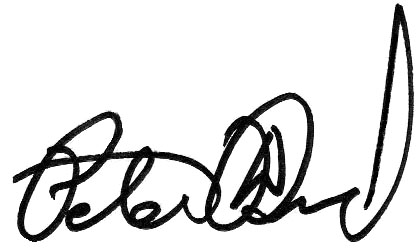
- Education: New York University (BA)
- Occupations: Novelist; short story writer; screenwriter; comic book writer
- Years active: 1985–2025

Peter Allen David (September 23, 1956 – May 24, 2025), often abbreviated PAD, was an American writer of comic books, novels, television, films, and video games. His notable comic book work includes an award-winning 12-year run on The Incredible Hulk, as well as runs on Aquaman, Young Justice, SpyBoy, Supergirl, Fallen Angel, Spider-Man, Spider-Man 2099, Captain Marvel, and X-Factor.

David's Star Trek work included comic books and novels such as the New Frontier book series. His other novels included film adaptations, media tie-ins, and original works, such as the Apropos of Nothing and Knight Life series. His television work includes series such as Babylon 5, Young Justice, Ben 10: Alien Force and Nickelodeon's Space Cases, which he co-created with Bill Mumy.

David often jokingly described his occupation as "Writer of Stuff", and he was noted for his prolific writing, characterized by its mingling of real-world issues with humor and references to popular culture, as well as elements of metafiction and self-reference.

One of the most prolific and influential comic book writers of the modern era, David earned several awards for his work, including a 1992 Eisner Award, a 1993 Wizard Fan Award, a 1996 Haxtur Award, a 2007 Julie Award, and a 2011 GLAAD Media Award.

== Early life and influences ==
Peter David was born September 23, 1956, in Fort Meade, Maryland, to Gunter and Dalia David (née Rojansky), an Israeli Jewish mother who had worked with DNA mappers James Watson and Francis Crick, and to whom David credited his sense of humor. Peter David's paternal grandparents, Martin and Hela David, and his father, Gunter, emigrated to the United States in the 1930s after antisemitism in Nazi Germany progressed to the point that Martin's Berlin shoe store became the target of vandalism. He had two siblings, a brother Wally, seven years his junior, who works as an IT Systems Administrator in the financial sector, and a younger sister named Beth.

David first became interested in comics when he was about five years old, reading copies of Harvey Comics' Casper and Wendy in a barbershop. He became interested in superheroes through the Adventures of Superman TV series. Although David's parents approved of his reading Harvey Comics and comics featuring Disney characters, they did not approve of superhero books, especially those published by Marvel Comics, feeling that characters that looked like monsters, such as the Thing or the Hulk, or who wore bug-eyed costumes, like Spider-Man, did not appear heroic. As a result, David read those comics in secret, beginning with his first Marvel book, Fantastic Four Annual #3 (November 1965), which saw the wedding of Mister Fantastic and the Invisible Woman. His parents eventually allowed him to start reading superhero titles, his favorite of which was Superman. He cited John Buscema as his favorite pre-1970s artist. David attended his first comic book convention around the time that Jack Kirby's New Gods premiered, after asking his father to take him to one of Phil Seuling's shows in New York, where David obtained Kirby's autograph, his first encounter with a comics professional.

David's earliest interest in writing came through the journalism work of his father, Gunter, who sometimes reviewed movies and took young Peter along (if it was age-appropriate). While Gunter wrote his reviews back at the newspaper's office, David wrote his own, portions of which sometimes found their way into Gunter's published reviews. David began to entertain the notion of becoming a professional writer at age twelve, buying a copy of The Guide to the Writer's Market, and subscribing to similar-themed magazines, in the hopes of becoming a reporter.

David lived in Bloomfield, New Jersey, in a small house at 11 Albert Terrace, and attended Demarest Elementary School. His family later moved to Verona, New Jersey, where he spent his adolescence. By the time he entered his teens, he had lost interest in comic books, feeling he had outgrown them. David's best friend in junior high and first year in high school, Keith, was gay, and David described how both of them were targets of ostracism and harassment from homophobes. Although his family eventually moved to Pennsylvania, his experiences in Verona soured him on that town and shaped his liberal sociopolitical positions regarding LGBT issues. He later made Verona the home location of villain Morgan le Fay in his novel Knight Life, and often discussed his progressive views on LGBT issues in his column and on his blog.

David's interest in comics was rekindled when he saw a copy of Superman vs. Muhammad Ali (1978) while passing a newsstand, and later, X-Men #95 (October 1975), and discovered in that latter book the "All-New, All-Different" team that had first appeared in Giant-Size X-Men #1 (May 1975). These two books were the first comics he had purchased in years.

A seminal moment in the course of his aspirations occurred when he met writer Stephen King at a book signing, and told him that he was an aspiring writer. King signed David's copy of Danse Macabre with the inscription, "Good luck with your writing career", which David in turn inscribed onto books presented to him by fans who told him the same thing. Other authors that David cited as influences included Harlan Ellison, Arthur Conan Doyle, Robert B. Parker, Neil Gaiman, Terry Pratchett, Robert Crais, and Edgar Rice Burroughs. Specific books he mentioned as favorites included To Kill a Mockingbird, Tarzan of the Apes, The Princess Bride by William Goldman, The Essential Ellison (a retrospective of the work of Harlan Ellison), A Confederacy of Dunces by John Kennedy Toole, Adams Versus Jefferson, and Don Quixote. David singled out Ellison in particular as a writer whom he tried to emulate.

David attended New York University, where he graduated with a Bachelor of Arts degree in journalism.

== Career ==
=== Early work ===
David's first professional assignment was covering the World Science Fiction Convention held in Washington in 1974 for the Philadelphia Bulletin.

David eventually gravitated towards fiction after his attempts at journalism did not meet with success. His first published fiction appeared in Asimov's Science Fiction in 1980. He sold an op-ed piece to The New York Times, but overall his submissions that met with rejection far outnumbered those accepted.

=== Comics career ===
==== 1980s ====
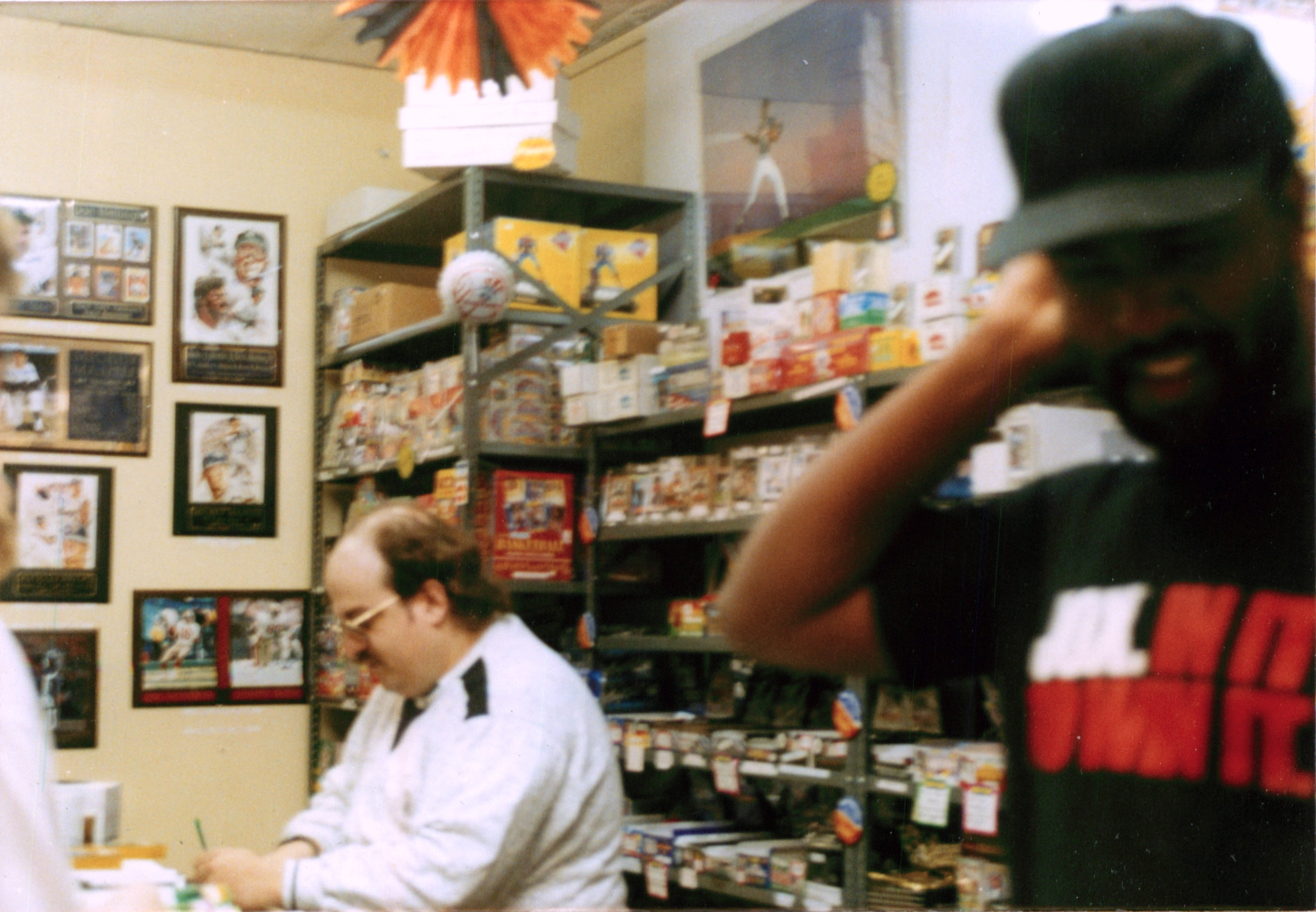
Peter David and Larry Stroman at a comic book signing for X-Factor in the early 1990s

David eventually gave up on a career in writing and came to work in book publishing. His first publishing job was for the E.P. Dutton imprint Elsevier/Nelson, where he worked mainly as an assistant to the editor-in-chief. He later worked in sales and distribution for Playboy Paperbacks. He subsequently worked for five years in Marvel Comics' Sales Department, first as Assistant Direct Sales Manager under Carol Kalish, who hired him, and then succeeding Kalish as Sales Manager. During this time he made some cursory attempts to sell stories, including submission of some Moon Knight plots to Dennis O'Neil, but his efforts were unfruitful.

Three years into David's tenure as Direct Sales Manager, Jim Owsley became editor of the Spider-Man titles. Although crossing over from sales into editorial was considered a conflict of interest in the Marvel offices, Owsley, whom David describes as a "maverick", was impressed with how David had not previously hesitated to work with him when Owsley was an assistant editor under Larry Hama. When Owsley became an editor, he purchased a Spider-Man story from David, which appeared in The Spectacular Spider-Man #103 (June 1985). Owsley subsequently purchased David's "The Death of Jean DeWolff", a violent murder mystery darker in tone than the usually lighter Spider-Man stories that ran in issues #107–110 (October 1985 – January 1986) of that title. Responding to charges of conflict of interest, David made a point of not discussing editorial matters with anyone during his 9-to-5 hours as Direct Sales Manager, and decided not to exploit his position as Sales Manager by promoting the title. Although David attributed the story's poor sales to this decision, he asserted that such crossing over from Sales to Editorial was now common. In the Marvel offices, a rumor circulated that it was actually Owsley who was writing the stories attributed to David. Nonetheless, David said he was fired from Spectacular Spider-Man by Owsley due to editorial pressure by Marvel's editor-in-chief Jim Shooter, and he commented that the resentment stirred by Owsley's purchase of his stories may have permanently damaged Owsley's career. Months later, Bob Harras offered David The Incredible Hulk, as it was a struggling title that no one else wanted to write, which gave David free rein with the character.

During his 12-year run on Hulk, David explored the recurring themes of the Hulk's multiple personality disorder, his periodic changes between the raging, less intelligent Green Hulk and the more streetwise, cerebral Grey Hulk, and of being a journeyman hero, which were inspired by The Incredible Hulk #312 (October 1985), in which writer Bill Mantlo (and possibly, according to David, Barry Windsor-Smith) had first established that Bruce Banner had suffered childhood abuse at the hands of his father Brian Banner. These aspects of the character were later used in the 2003 feature film adaptation by screenwriter Michael France and director Ang Lee. Comic Book Resources credits David with making the formerly poor-selling book "a must-read mega-hit". David collaborated with a number of artists who became fan-favorites on the series, including Todd McFarlane, Dale Keown, and Gary Frank. Among the new characters he created during his run on the series were the Riot Squad and the Pantheon. David wrote the first appearance of the Thunderbolts, a team created by Kurt Busiek and Mark Bagley, in The Incredible Hulk #449 (January 1997).

It was after he had been freelancing for a year, and into his run on Hulk, that David felt that his writing career had cemented. After putting out feelers at DC Comics, and being offered the job of writing a four-issue miniseries of The Phantom by editor Mike Gold, David quit his sales position to write full-time. David had a brief tenure writing Green Lantern when the character was exclusive to the short-lived anthology series Action Comics Weekly (issues #608–620) in 1988.

David took over Dreadstar during its First Comics run, with issue #41 (March 1989) after Jim Starlin left the title, and remained on it until issue #64 (March 1991), the final issue of that run. David's other Marvel Comics work in the late 1980s and 1990s includes runs on Wolverine, the New Universe series Mark Hazzard: Merc and Justice, a run on the original X-Factor, and the futuristic series Spider-Man 2099, about a man in the year 2099 who takes up the mantle of Spider-Man, the title character of which David co-created. David left X-Factor after 19 issues, and he wrote the first 44 issues of Spider-Man 2099 before quitting that book to protest the firing of editor Joey Cavalieri. The book was cancelled two issues later, along with the entire 2099 line.

==== 1990s ====
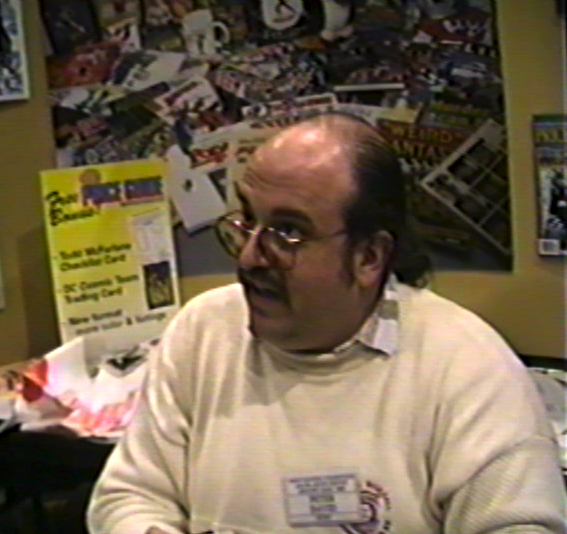
Peter David at a comics convention in the early 1990s

In 1990, David wrote a seven-issue Aquaman miniseries, The Atlantis Chronicles, for DC Comics, about the history of Aquaman's home of Atlantis, which David referred to as among the written works of which he was most proud, and his first time writing in the full script format. In 1994 he wrote an Aquaman miniseries, Aquaman: Time and Tide, which led to a relaunched monthly Aquaman series, the first 46 issues of which he wrote from 1994 to 1998. His run on Aquaman gained notoriety, for in the book's second issue, Aquaman lost a hand, which was then replaced with a harpoon, a feature of the character that endured for the duration of David's run on the book. More broadly, his run recast the character as an aggressive man of action, one deserving of greater respect, in contrast to the "fish-talking punch line" into which the TV series Super Friends had rendered him. David quit that book over creative differences.

David wrote the Star Trek comic book for DC from 1988 to 1991, when that company held the licensing rights to the property, though he opined that novels are better suited to Star Trek, whose stories are not highly visual. He and Ron Marz cowrote the DC vs. Marvel intercompany crossover in 1996. David also had runs on Supergirl and Young Justice, the latter eventually being canceled so that DC could use that book's characters in a relaunched Teen Titans monthly.

David's work for Dark Horse Comics included the teen spy adventure SpyBoy, which appeared in a series and a number of miniseries between 1999 and 2004, and the 2007 miniseries The Scream.

Other 1990s work includes the 1997 miniseries Heroes Reborn: The Return, for Marvel, and two creator-owned properties: Soulsearchers and Company, published by Claypool Comics, and the Epic Comics title Sachs and Violens, which he produced with co-creator/artist George Pérez.

==== 2000s ====
David's early 2000s work includes runs on two volumes of Captain Marvel as well as the Before the Fantastic Four: Reed Richards limited series.

David and his second wife, Kathleen, wrote the final English-language text for the first four volumes of the manga series Negima for Del Rey Manga.

In 2003, David began writing another creator-owned comic, Fallen Angel, for DC Comics, which he created in order to make use of plans he had devised for Supergirl after the "Many Happy Returns" storyline, but which were derailed by that series' cancellation. That same year, he wrote a Teenage Mutant Ninja Turtles series for Dreamwave that tied into the animated television series broadcast that year.

DC canceled Fallen Angel after 20 issues, but David restarted the title at IDW Publishing at the end of 2005. Other IDW work included a Spike: Old Times one-shot and the Spike vs. Dracula mini-series, both based on the character from the Buffy the Vampire Slayer and Angel television series.

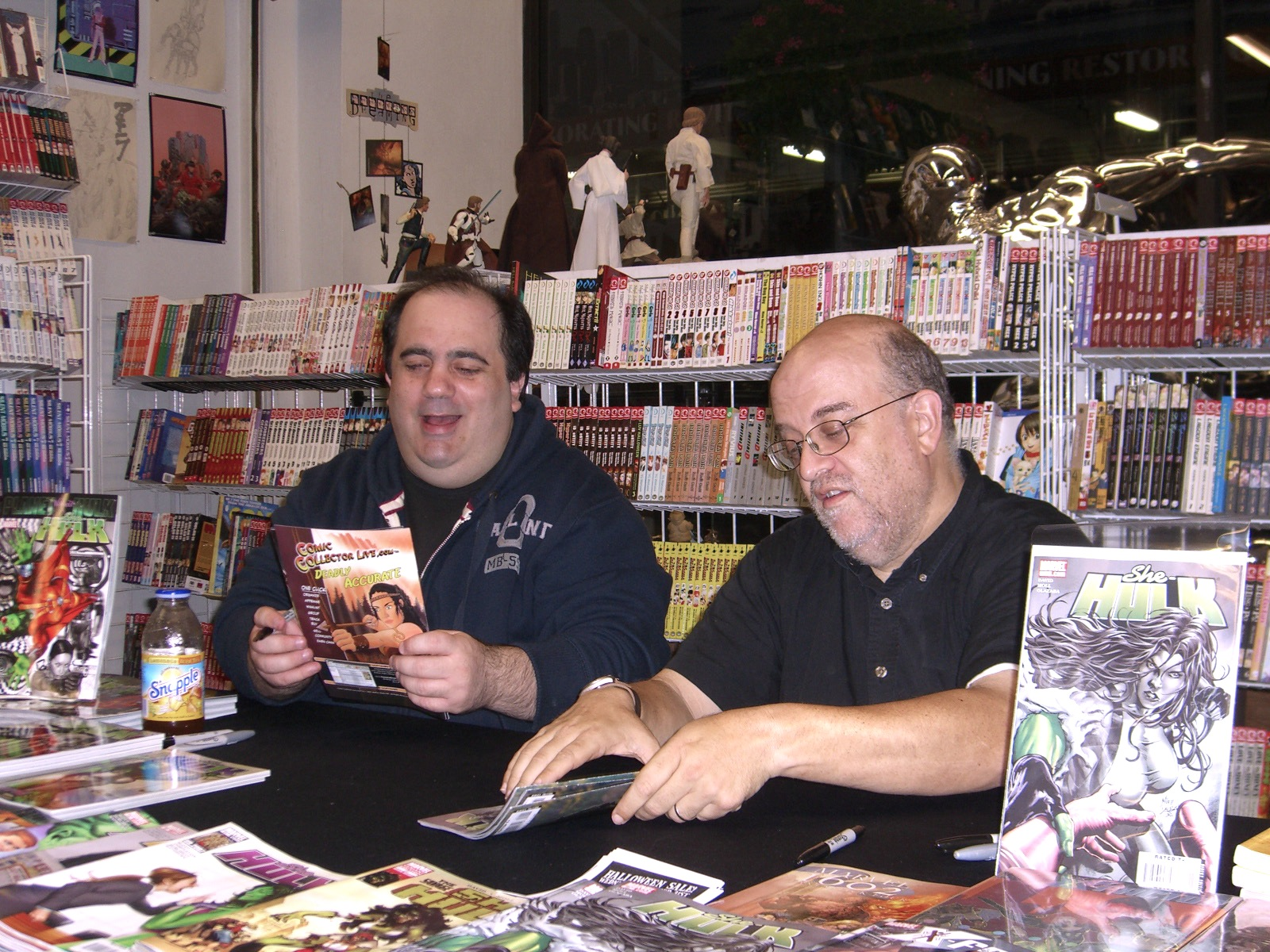
David with writer Dan Slott at Jim Hanley's Universe in Manhattan, October 25, 2007, promoting the beginning of David's tenure as writer on She-Hulk

In 2005, David briefly returned to The Incredible Hulk, though he left after only 11 issues because of his workload. He started a new series, Friendly Neighborhood Spider-Man, beginning with a twelve-part crossover storyline called "The Other", which, along with J. Michael Straczynski's run on The Amazing Spider-Man, and Reginald Hudlin's run on Marvel Knights Spider-Man, depicted the webslinger as he discovered he was dying, lost an eye during a traumatic fight with Morlun, underwent a metamorphosis, and emerged with new abilities and insights into his powers. The storyline caused some controversy among readers for its introduction of retractable stingers in Spider-Man's arms, and the establishment of his powers being derived from his status as a "Spider-Totem". David's final issue of that title was #23.

David wrote a MadroX miniseries that year, whose success led to a relaunch of a monthly X-Factor volume 3 written by him. This was a revamped version of the title starring both Madrox and other members of the former X-Factor title that David had written in the early 1990s, now working as investigators in a detective agency of that name. David's work on the title garnered praise from Ain't it Cool News, and David stated that the opt in/opt out policy and greater planning with which Marvel now executes crossover storylines made his second stint on the title far easier. His decision to explicitly establish male characters Shatterstar and Rictor as sharing a sexual attraction to one another (a confirmation of clues that had been established in X-Force years earlier in issues such as X-Force #25, 34, 43, 49, 56 and X-Force '99 Annual), drew criticism from Shatterstar's co-creator, Rob Liefeld, though Editor-in-Chief Joe Quesada supported David's story. David eventually won a 2011 GLAAD Media Award for Outstanding Comic Book for his work on the title.

On February 11, 2006, David announced at the WonderCon convention in California in that he had signed an exclusive contract with Marvel Comics. Fallen Angel, Soulsearchers and Company and David's Spike miniseries were "grandfathered" into the contract, so as to not be affected by it. The first new project undertaken by David after entering into the contract, which he announced on April 5, 2006, was writing the dialogue for The Dark Tower: The Gunslinger Born, the comic book spin-off of Stephen King's The Dark Tower novels, which was to be illustrated by Jae Lee, as well as scripting the subsequent Dark Tower comics.

David took over Marvel's She-Hulk after writer Dan Slott's departure, beginning with issue #22. His run, which won praise, ended with issue #38, when the series was canceled. He wrote a 2008–09 Sir Apropos of Nothing miniseries, based on the character from his novels, which was published by IDW Publishing.

David's other 2000s comics based on licensed or adapted properties include Halo: Helljumper, a 2009 miniseries based on the Halo video game, a 2009 Ben 10: Alien Force manga book published by Del Rey, Ben Folds Four, a "Little Mermaid" story in Jim Valentino's Fractured Fables anthology that was praised by Ain't It Cool News, an adaptation of the 1982 film Tron that was released to tie in with that film's 2010 sequel, and a John Carter of Mars prequel to the 2012 feature film. In 2010, he co-wrote The Spider-Man Vault: A Museum-in-a-Book with Rare Collectibles Spun from Marvel's Web with Robert Greenberger. David wrote the script for Avengers: Season One, an original graphic novel published to promote the DVD release of The Avengers.

==== 2010s ====
On November 24, 2011, David was one of the balloon handlers who pulled the Spider-Man balloon during the Macy's Thanksgiving Day Parade.

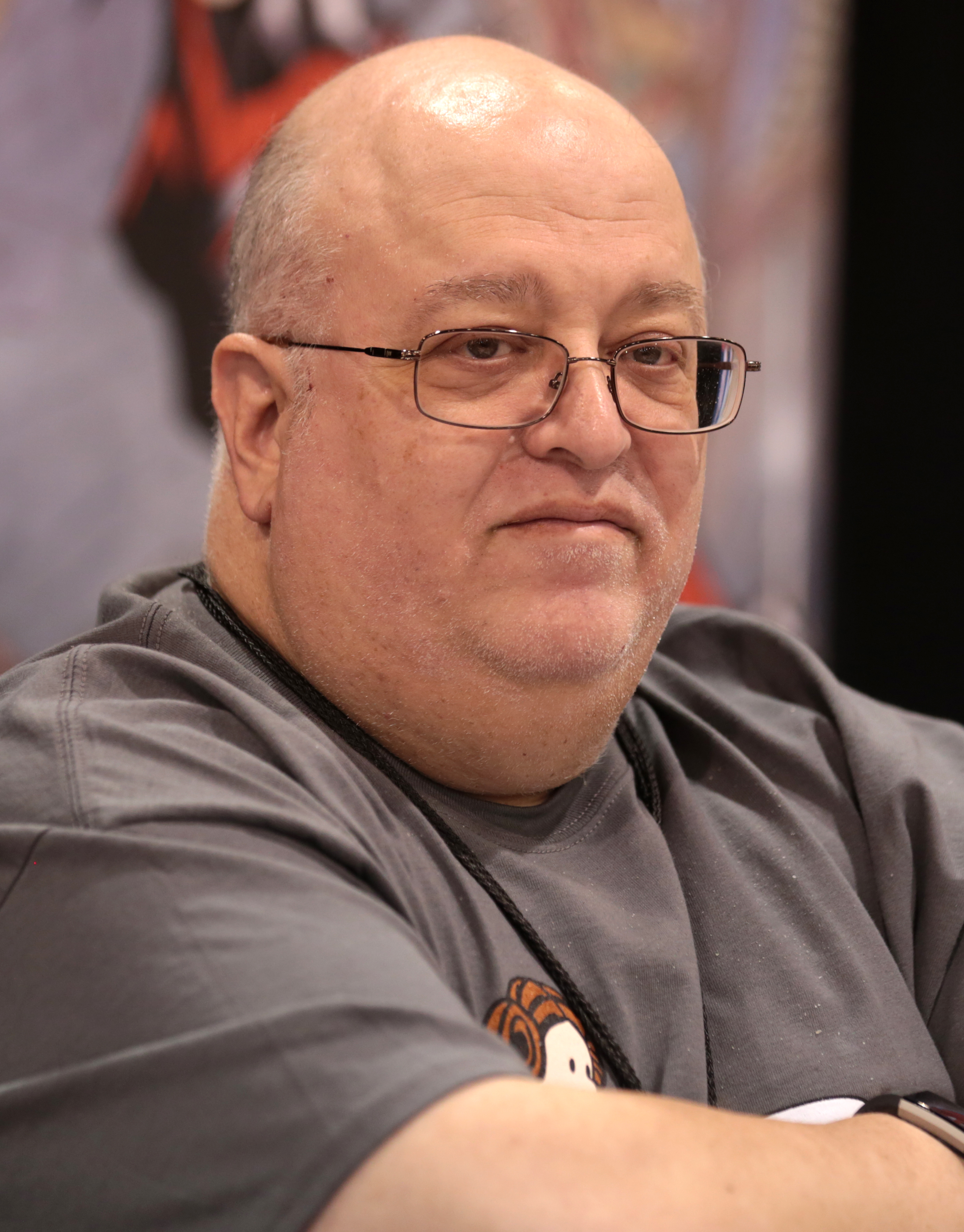
David at the 2017 Phoenix Comicon

In October 2013, X-Factor ended its run with issue #262, concluding the X-Factor Investigations incarnation of the series. The book was then relaunched as All-New X-Factor, a new series with artist Carmine Di Giandomenico, as a part of the All-New Marvel NOW! initiative announced at the 2013 New York Comic Con. The opening storyline, which continues events from issue #260 of the previous series, establishes the new corporate-sponsored version of the team, and includes Polaris, Quicksilver, and Gambit.

In July 2014, David returned to Spider-Man 2099, writing the second volume of Spider-Man 2099 with artist Will Sliney. With this series, David was again writing two series, X-Factor and Spider-Man 2099, after having previously done so decades prior, a coincidence that prompted him to joke at the June 2014 Special Edition NYC convention, "I don't know whether to be proud of that or if I'm in a rut!"

In 2014, David wrote a six-part story-arc for The Phantom for publishing company Hermes Press, a story that David, reportedly had wanted to write for many years.

In 2015, Simon and Schuster published Stan Lee's autobiographical graphic novel, Amazing Fantastic Incredible, which David co-wrote, and which became a New York Times bestseller in its first week of release.

In April 2017, following the conclusion of the Spider-Man storyline "Dead No More: The Clone Conspiracy", which saw the return of Ben Reilly, Marvel premiered the monthly series Ben Reilly: The Scarlet Spider, with David as writer. David explained to Syfy Wire that when Marvel offered him the job, he was initially ambivalent, as Ben Reilly had never been his favorite incarnation of Spider-Man, and given Reilly's recent emergence as the villainous Jackal. However, David gave further consideration to the fact that a book whose main character had a skewed, villainous worldview was not something Marvel had historically done much of, and decided that the premise presented itself with opportunities that intrigued him enough to accept the job. His other Spider-Man work during this decade included a 2019 five-issue miniseries Symbiote Spider-Man, which holds a 7.5 out of 10 rating at the review aggregator Comic Book Roundup, and the 2020 follow-up miniseries Symbiote Spider-Man: Alien Reality, which holds a 7.6 rating at Comic Book Roundup.

=== Novels ===
David's career as a novelist developed concurrently with his comic-book writing career. David had been working at a publisher that went out of business, and a former coworker from that publisher became his agent, through whom he sold his first novel, Knight Life, to Ace Books. Although the sale was made before he wrote any comic books, the novel was not published until eighteen months later, in 1987. The novel depicts the reappearance of King Arthur in modern-day New York City. Another early novel of his, Howling Mad, is about a wolf that turns into a human after being bitten by a werewolf. Ace Books hired David to write the Photon and Psi-Man novels, though they published them under the "house name" David Peters, over David's objections. David updated Knight Life years later when Penguin Putnam brought it back into print in 2003, and made it a trilogy with the sequels One Knight Only and Fall of Knight, which were published in 2004 and 2007, respectively. Penguin rereleased Howling Mad, as well as the Psi-Man books under David's actual name.

David first began writing Star Trek novels at the request of Pocket Books editor Dave Stern, who was a fan of David's Star Trek comic book work. His Star Trek novels are among those for which he is best known, including Q-in-Law; I, Q; Vendetta; Q-Squared. His most popular novel was 1993's Imzadi, which told the backstory first romance of the characters William Riker and Deanna Troi. He created the ongoing novel series, Star Trek: New Frontier, a spin-off from Star Trek: The Next Generation, with John J. Ordover in 1997. David wrote 21 books in that series, a number of which were New York Times best sellers. That line ended in September 2015 with the publication of the third part of the digital novel, The Returned. David's other science fiction tie-in novels include writing five Babylon 5 novels, three of which were originals, and two of which were adaptations of the TV movies Thirdspace and In the Beginning.

His other novel adaptations include those of the films The Return of Swamp Thing, The Rocketeer, Batman Forever, Spider-Man, Spider-Man 2, Spider-Man 3, Hulk, The Incredible Hulk, Fantastic Four, and Iron Man. He wrote an original Hulk novel, The Incredible Hulk: What Savage Beast, and an adaptation of an unused Alien Nation television script, "Body and Soul".

David's 2009 novel Tigerheart is a re-imagining of Peter Pan with a mix of new and old characters, told as a Victorian bedtime story, much like the classic tale. It was praised by Ain't It Cool News, and honored by the School Library Journal as one of 2008's Best Adult Books for High School Students. His Sir Apropos of Nothing fantasy trilogy, Sir Apropos of Nothing, The Woad to Wuin and Tong Lashing, features characters and settings completely of David's own creation, as does his 2007 fantasy novel, Darkness of the Light, which is the first in a new trilogy of novels titled The Hidden Earth. The second installment, The Highness of the Low, was scheduled to be published in September 2009, but David related on his blog that it was delayed until the winter of 2012.

David's 2010 novel work includes Year of the Black Rainbow, a novel cowritten with musician Claudio Sanchez of the band Coheed and Cambria, that was released with the band's album of the same name, and a Fable original novel The Balverine Order, set between the events of Fable II and Fable III. In April 2011, David announced that, in addition to another Fable novel, he and a number of other writers, including Glenn Hauman, Mike Friedman and Bob Greenberger, were assembling an electronic publishing endeavor called Crazy Eight Press to publish e-books directly to fans, the first of which would be David's Arthurian story, The Camelot Papers. David explained that the second book in his "Hidden Earth" trilogy would be published through Crazy Eight. In September 2013, David acknowledged that books published through Crazy Eight were not as lucrative for him as those for publishers that pay him advances, and announced that his then-impending novel, ARTFUL: Being the Heretofore Secret History of that Unique Individual, The Artful Dodger, Hunter of Vampyres (Amongst Other Things.), would be published by Amazon.com.

=== Writing habits and approach ===
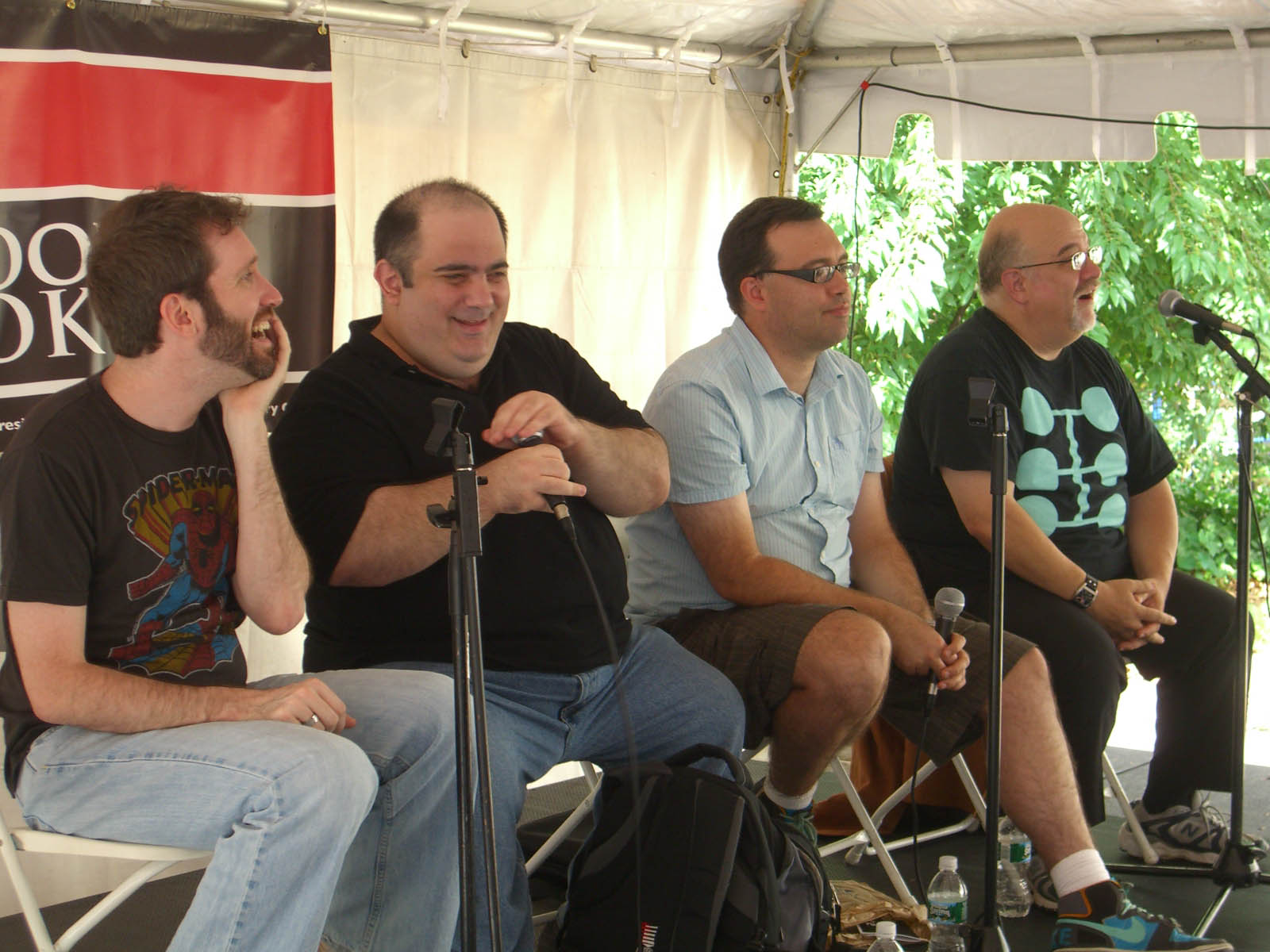
David (at far right) on a panel on comic book writing at the 2009 Brooklyn Book Festival. Beside him (left to right) are Jim McCann, Dan Slott and Fred Van Lente.

David stated that he tried to block out different days and different times to work on different projects. He usually worked in the morning, for example, on novels, and did comics-related work in the afternoon. Having previously used Smith Corona typewriters, he wrote on a Sony Vaio desktop computer, using Microsoft Word for his comics and novel work, and Final Draft for his screenplays. When writing novels, he sometimes outlined the story, and sometimes improvised as he was writing. Following his stroke in December 2012, David began using DragonDictate to write. Todd McFarlane's original art for the cover of The Incredible Hulk #340, featuring Wolverine, which McFarlane gave to David as a gift, hung in David's office.

David previously wrote his comic book scripts using the Marvel Method, but due to his tendency to overplot, as during his collaboration with McFarlane on The Incredible Hulk, he switched to the full script method, which he continued to use as of 2003. He stated that he preferred to plot his comics stories in six-month arcs. He stated that when he worked on a particular title, he always did so with a particular person or group of people in mind to which he dedicated it, explaining that he had written Supergirl for his daughters, Young Justice for a son he might one day have had and The Incredible Hulk for his first wife, Myra, who first urged him to accept the job of writing that book. David further explained that the events of his own life were sometimes reflected in his work, as when, for example, following the breakup of his first marriage, the direction of The Incredible Hulk faltered, with the Hulk wandering the world aimlessly, hopelessly looking to be loved.

David stated that his favorite female character of his own creation was Lee, the protagonist of Fallen Angel, which he said is derived from the positive female fan reaction to that character. Characters that David did not write but which he expressed an interest in writing for the comics medium included Batman, Tarzan, Doc Savage, the Dragonriders of Pern, the Steed/Peel Avengers, and Dracula. He specifically mentioned interest in writing a Tarzan vs. the Phantom story.

=== Other published work ===
- Before David became a professional writer, he wrote fan fiction, examples of which include The TARDIS at Pooh Corner.
- David began writing his weekly opinion column, "But I Digress...", in Comics Buyer's Guide, which first appeared in the July 27, 1990 edition, agreeing to do the column on the suggestion of an anonymous fan to Comics Buyer's Guide editors Don and Maggie Thompson, David credited the existence of the column to Harlan Ellison, whom he attempted to emulate with the column, and who wrote the introduction to the 1994 But I Digress collection. David donated his earnings from the column to the Comic Book Legal Defense Fund. David continued the column following CBG's switch to a monthly magazine format in 2004, until the magazine ceased publication in March 2013. A second collection, More Digressions, was published by Mad Norwegian Press in June 2009. He used the column to comment on the state of the industry, which sometimes brought him into conflict with other creators in his column, and even put him in the position of criticizing the publishers he did work for. In his memoir, he admitted, "My employers were incredibly good sports about it."
- David assisted Star Trek actor James Doohan with Doohan's 1996 autobiography, Beam Me Up, Scotty.
- An interview with David appeared in the first volume of Writers on Comic Scriptwriting in 2002.
- David's instructional book, Writing for Comics with Peter David, was published by Impact Books in June 2006. A second edition, Writing for Comics and Graphic Novels with Peter David, was published in August 2009.
- David's short story, "Colors Seen by Candlelight", appeared in Tales of Zorro, the first collection of original Zorro short fiction ever authorized by Zorro Productions, Inc. The anthology, edited by Richard Dean Starr, was published by Moonstone Books in 2008.
- In 2009 David organized a satirical round-robin story called "Potato Noon", organized by David and hosted on his website. which was inspired by the announcement of Russet Noon, an unauthorized fan fiction novel based on Stephenie Meyer's Twilight series. Authors including Hugh Casey, Keith R.A. DeCandido, and Kevin Killiany participated in the story, with characters such as Michael Dukakis, Dan Quayle, and Ernest Hemingway appearing alongside satirical versions of Meyer's characters. David conceived the satire as a not-for-profit venture, and while he had no plans to publish the completed "Potato Moon", he allowed for the possibility of a future charity release to benefit the Comic Book Legal Defense Fund.
- In 2022, David curated an anthology titled The Fans are Buried Tales, which, in his own words, combined Chaucer's Canterbury Tales with an event at a Farpoint convention in which everyone was snowed in "and created the concept of a large, general SF convention in which the attendees are snowed in and wind up exchanging stories of their characters/genres in the hotel bar." When he discovered that organizers of the 2022 Farpoint convention would not be requiring attendees to show proof of vaccination or negative test results, he resorted to using a Kickstarter to pay those involved. Many of the stories were from fellow Crazy 8 authors, while others were submitted by other professional writers and even fans.

=== Other media ===
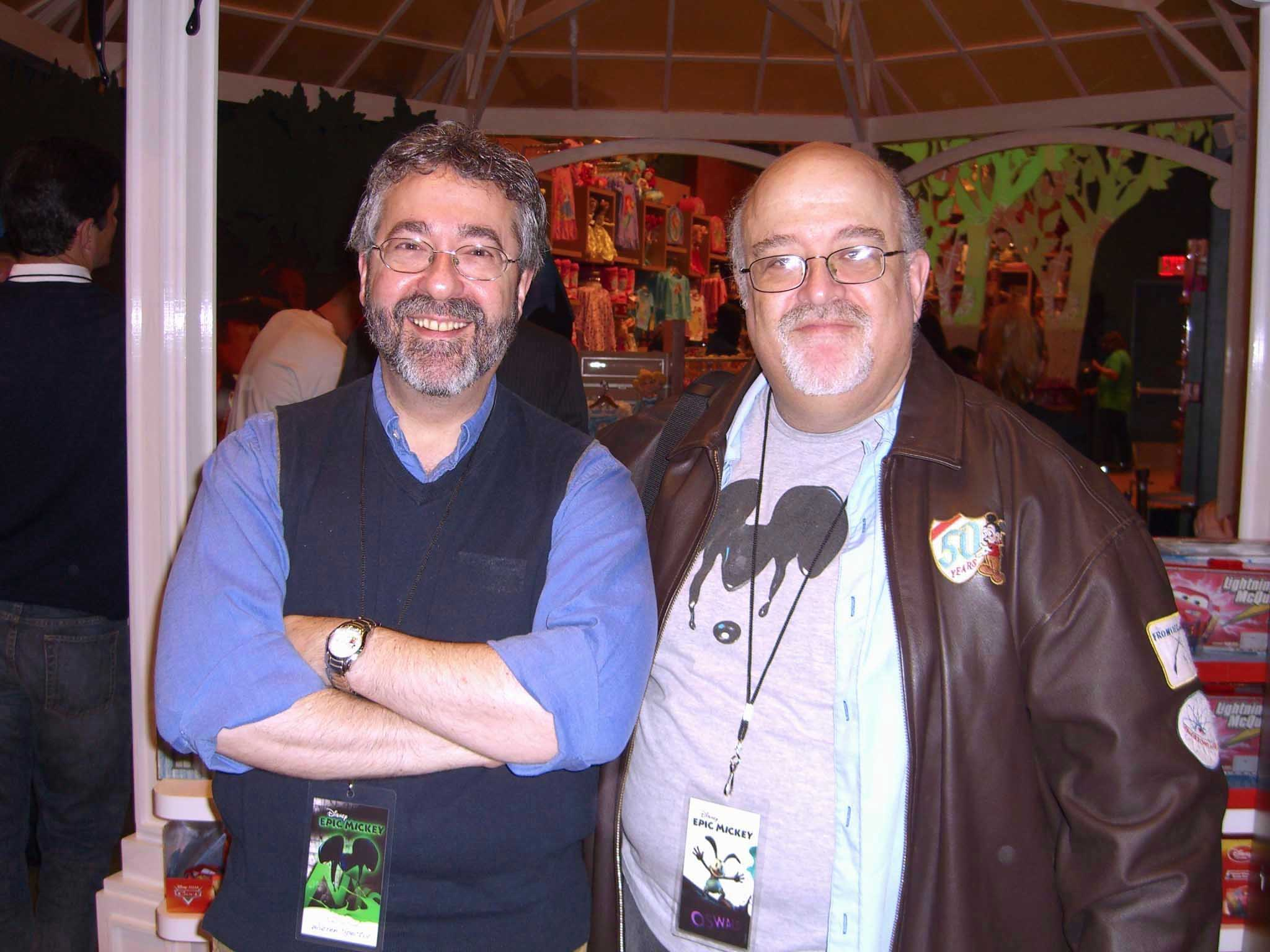
David with Warren Spector at the November 30, 2010, Times Square Disney Store launch party for Epic Mickey, which Spector designed, and for which David wrote two tie-in products

David wrote for several television series and video games. He wrote two scripts for Babylon 5 (the second-season episodes "Soul Mates" and "There All the Honor Lies"), and the episode "Ruling from the Tomb" for its sequel series, Crusade. With actor/writer Bill Mumy, he was co-creator of the television series Space Cases, which ran for two seasons on Nickelodeon, and which proved to be his most lucrative work. David himself appeared as Ben, the father of series regular Bova, in the second-season episode "Long Distance Calls". David's oldest daughter, Shana, later appeared as Pezu, the emotionally disturbed sentient computer in the series finale "A Friend in Need".

David wrote and co-produced several films for Full Moon Entertainment including Trancers 4, Trancers 5, Oblivion, and Oblivion 2: Backlash. He made cameo appearances in some of the films as well and was briefly signed to their unrealized Silver Moon Comics line.

David wrote an unproduced script for the fifth season of Babylon 5 called "Gut Reactions", which he wrote with Bill Mumy.

David wrote "In Charm's Way", an episode of Ben 10: Alien Force. The script was recorded in early 2009, and the episode premiered November 13, 2009. He later wrote three episodes of the sequel series Ben 10: Ultimate Alien, the first of which, "Reflected Glory", premiered October 15, 2010.

David wrote the script for the Xbox 360 video game Shadow Complex, which debuted in August 2009.

David wrote several episodes of the Young Justice animated TV series, which premiered in 2010, and is based on the comic book series he wrote from 1998 to 2003. The first episode he wrote was "Secrets". The same year, he wrote a graphic novel adaptation of the video game Epic Mickey, and a prequel digicomic, Disney's Epic Mickey: Tales of Wasteland.

In 2011 David wrote the video game Spider-Man: Edge of Time.

At the 2012 San Diego Comic-Con, Stan Lee announced his new YouTube channel, Stan Lee's World of Heroes, which airs several programs created by Lee and other creators. One of them, Head Cases, is a superhero sitcom created by David and his wife Kathleen and produced by David M. Uslan. The series centers on Thunderhead, a would-be hero whose inability to utilize his ability to produce loud thunderblasts without injury to himself leads him to become a source of comedic derision in the superhero community. The series, which explores events that occur in between the battles typically seen in comic books, was based on a concept originated by Uslan, and partly inspired by It's Always Sunny in Philadelphia. David described Head Cases as a 75-minute film divided into 5-minute webisodes. The series featured guest appearances by other industry personalities, including Stan Lee, who appears as himself, functioning in a similar manner to Norm Peterson from Cheers.

== Awards and nominations ==
=== Awards ===
- 1992 Eisner Award for Best Writer/Artist or Writer/Artist Team (shared with Dale Keown for The Incredible Hulk)
- 1993 Wizard Fan Award
- 1993 UK Comic Art Award
- 1994 Golden Duck Award for Young Adult Series (for Star Trek: Starfleet Academy)
- 1995 Australian OZCon 1995 Award for Favorite International Writer
- 1996 Haxtur Award for Best Script (for Para que la oscuridad no nos alcance ["So That the Dark Does Not Reach Us"], in Hulk La caída del Panteón [Hulk: The Fall of the Pantheon])
- 2007 Julie Award for achievements in multiple genres
- 2011 GLAAD Media Award for Outstanding Comic Book (X-Factor vol. 3)
- 2011 International Association of Media Tie-In Writers Grandmaster Award (aka Faust Award)
- 2016 Inkpot Award from Comic-Con International

=== Nominations ===
- 1992 Haxtur Award for Best Script (for Crónicas de Atlantis)
- 1992 Prometheus Award (for Star Trek: The Rift)
- 1992 Eisner Award for Best Continuing Series (shared with Dale Keown for The Incredible Hulk)
- 1994 Eisner Award for Best Writer (for The Incredible Hulk)
- 1995 Haxtur Award for Best Long Story (shared with George Pérez for Sachs & Violens)
- 1997 Cable Ace Award for Best Children's Series (shared with Bill Mumy for Space Cases)
- 1998 Harvey Award for Best Single Issue or Story (shared with Adam Kubert and Bobbie Chase for The Incredible Hulk #-1)
- 1999 Eisner Award for Best New Series (shared with Todd Nauck and Lary Stucker for Young Justice)
- 1999 Eisner Award for Best Title for a Younger Audience (for Young Justice)

== Public image ==
On more than one occasion, editorial problems or corporate pressure to modify his plot lines prompted David to leave comics assignments. This prompted his decision to terminate his first run on Marvel's X-Factor, which he had to rewrite plots to accommodate crossover events with other Marvel titles. He resigned from Spider-Man 2099 to protest the firing of editor Joey Cavalieri and from Aquaman over creative differences. When David abruptly left his first stint on The Incredible Hulk due to editorial pressures, some of the plot points of the character that David established were retconned by later creative teams.

In his "But I Digress" column, which began appearing in the Comics Buyer's Guide on July 27, 1990, and in his blog, in operation from April 2002, David was outspoken in many of his views pertaining to the comic book industry and numerous other subjects. He criticized the low regard in which writers are held, the practice of selling polybagged comics, so-called "poster covers" that showcase a character without indicating anything about the comic's content, the meaninglessness of killing off characters to be eventually revived, the poor commitment on the part of some to maintaining continuity in shared fictional universes, and the emphasis on gearing monthly comics series toward eventual collection into trade paperbacks. David opined that failure on the part of consumers to purchase the monthly individual issues in favor of waiting for the trade collections hurts the sales of the monthly and its chances of being collected at all. A father of four daughters, David worked on a number of series that feature female leads, such as Supergirl, Fallen Angel and She-Hulk, and he lamented that the American comic book market was not very supportive of such books. David spoke out about fans who were abusive or threatening to creators, and against copyright infringement, particularly that which is committed through peer-to-peer file sharing and posting literary works in their entirety on the Internet without the permission of the copyright holder.

On many occasions, he offered criticisms of specific publishers, as when he criticized Wizard magazine for ageism. He criticized companies for not sufficiently compensating the creators of their long-standing and lucrative characters, such as Marvel Comics for its treatment of Blade creator Marv Wolfman and Archie Comics for its treatment of Josie and the Pussycats creator Dan DeCarlo. He criticized publishers for various other business practices, including Marvel and Image Comics. He defended said companies from criticism he feels is unfounded, as when he defended Marvel from a February 17, 1992, Barron's magazine article. He criticized deletionists on Wikipedia on more than one occasion.

On occasion, he disagreed publicly with specific industry personalities such as Frank Miller and Jim Shooter. Particularly publicized were his disagreements with Spawn creator Todd McFarlane in 1992 and 1993, in the wake of the formation of Image Comics, the company McFarlane co-founded. This came to a head during a public debate they participated in at Philadelphia's Comicfest convention in October 1993, which was moderated by artist George Pérez. McFarlane claimed that Image was not being treated fairly by the media, and by David in particular. The three judges, Maggie Thompson, editor of the Comics Buyer's Guide, William Christensen of Wizard Press, and John Danovich of the magazine Hero Illustrated, voted 2–1 in favor of David, with Danovich voting the debate a tie. David later criticized McFarlane for other business practices, and engaged in public disagreements with The Comics Journal editor Gary Groth, Erik Larsen, Rob Liefeld, Marvel editor-in-chief Joe Quesada, writer/director Kevin Smith, DC Comics vice president and executive editor Dan DiDio, and John Byrne.

Despite his differences with Byrne, David stated that he was still a fan of Byrne's, citing Byrne's work on X-Men, Fantastic Four, Next Men, Alpha Flight and Babe.

Politically, David identified himself as liberal. He was critical of the George W. Bush administration in general, and the Iraq War in particular, as well as other Republicans and the religious right. He also became a staunch critic of President Donald Trump and his administration, criticizing his policies on a weekly basis. He spoke out in favor of Israel's right to defend itself from aggressors, and opined that certain criticisms of Israel indicated bias and double standards. He favored gun control, and held progressive or liberal views on LGBT issues, including favoring gay marriage and allowing openly homosexual individuals to serve in the military. He opposed capital punishment. He was an advocate of freedom of speech, having criticized various publicized instances of censorship in general, such as the targeting of comic book retailers for prosecution for selling certain comic books, and the Comics Code Authority in particular. He was a promoter and activist for the Comic Book Legal Defense Fund, which comes to the aid of such creators and retailers. He criticized ideas associated with liberalism or political correctness, such as certain publicized cases of alleged sexual harassment or discrimination that he deems unfounded, and did not shy away from criticizing liberals and Democrats, including Bill Clinton, Al Gore, Hillary Clinton, Michelle Obama, Caroline Kennedy, and Barack Obama.

In October 2016, David generated controversy for remarks he made during a panel discussion at the New York Comic Con to Vicente Rodriguez, a fan and the founder of Roma Pop, an organization that seeks to promote more positive representation of the Romani in comics. Rodriguez had asked speakers at multiple panels at the convention about greater Romani representation in comics, in light of what he said were stereotypical depictions of that group. When he asked David about what the public could do about Marvel's editorial policies regarding this, David related an anecdote from a 1993 trip to Bucharest, where he was told by his guide that the crippled children he saw had been maimed by their parents to improve their success as beggars. David then angrily rebuffed further interjections by Rodriguez before moving onto the next question. David would later defend these beliefs on his blog, insisting that he had written Romani characters like Quicksilver in a positive manner, and was angered by the crippling of children. Comics Beat, in reporting on the incident, stated that David's claim about the children is an urban myth commonly circulated in Romania, and that the malformed limbs seen in such children more likely resulted from lack of medical care, owing to the Romani distrust of the medical establishment that resulted from the forcible sterilization programs imposed upon them in many European nations until the 2000s. Two days after his first blog post, and the day after the Comics Beat article, David published a second blog post in which he apologized for his conduct, stating that after researching the matter, he concluded that the children he saw likely suffered from genetic conditions, and that he had no right to speak as he had to Rodriguez. David also related that he had apologized to Rodriguez in person in subsequent encounters at the convention, and resolved to treat Romani characters with respect, as he believed he always had.

== Personal life ==
Beginning in the early 1990s, David lived in Patchogue, Long Island, where he lived until his death.

David met his first wife, Myra Kasman, at a Star Trek convention. They married in June 1977, with his childhood friend Keith serving as best man. Together they had three daughters, Shana, Guinevere and Ariel. They separated in late 1996 and were divorced by 1998. David began dating Kathleen O'Shea, a bookseller, puppeteer and writer/editor in 1998. After dating for three years, David proposed to O'Shea at the Adventurers Club in Disney World on September 3, 2000. They married on May 26, 2001, in Atlanta, Georgia. Their daughter, Caroline Helen David, was born on December 5, 2002, and named after David's deceased friend and co-worker, Carol Kalish. David and his family lived in Suffolk County, New York, on the south shore of Long Island, where his favorite local comics shop was Fourth World Comics in Smithtown, New York. David's father, Gunter, died of cancer on April 20, 2015. David's mother, Dalia, died May 27, 2017.

David had been a Conservative Jew but, as of October 2003, attended a Reform synagogue. His Hebrew name in patronymic form was Jacob Ben Joachim. However, he expressed reservations about organized religion.

David was an avid fan of bowling, and a bowler himself, as is his daughter Ariel. He was a fan of the New York Mets, and practiced tai chi. His favorite music included The Beatles, and his favorite albums included Harry Chapin's Verities and Balderdash and the soundtracks to Amadeus and Terminator 2: Judgment Day. His favorite movies included the James Bond films, The Adventures of Robin Hood, Casablanca, and the early Johnny Weissmuller Tarzan films. His favorite TV shows included Doctor Who, Hill Street Blues, Charmed, Carnivale, Boston Public, The Practice, Friends, Buffy the Vampire Slayer, Angel, Alias and The West Wing. He was a fan of musicals, in particular 1776, Man of La Mancha, Li'l Abner and Into the Woods, with a taste for Lerner and Loewe and Stephen Sondheim. He also acted in local stage productions.

=== Health and death ===
In June 2010, David's wife announced on his website that he had successfully undergone surgery to relieve serious back pain. He later explained on his site that the pain, which he had been suffering in his hips and knees for three weeks, left him unable to function, and was eventually diagnosed as a herniated disc caused by bone fragments and fluid buildup. He underwent a three-hour discectomy and was told his full strength would return in six months.

On December 29, 2012, David suffered a ischemic stroke while on vacation in Florida. The stroke occurred in the pons section of David's brain, from which he lost most of the use of his right arm and his right leg, and suffered from blurred vision in his right eye. While a total recovery was indicated to be unlikely, he remained in good spirits, and underwent physical therapy in order to return to his prior routine. Two and a half months later, his condition had improved. His vision problems were gone, and he was able to navigate around his house without a wheelchair, and resume bowling and practicing tai chi. He had made slow and steady progress on his right leg and arm, and was continuing his therapy. Six months after the stroke, David had completed his physical therapy, though he still suffered some pain in his shoulder, and intended to work on improving his reduced endurance. David revealed in January 2015 that he had been diagnosed with Type 2 diabetes a year prior.

In March 2017, David announced on his blog that the Internal Revenue Service was demanding that he pay US$88,000 in unpaid taxes, penalty and interest, which began to accumulate when his divorce from his first wife used up his savings. He started a GoFundMe campaign to raise the money from friends and fans, which raised $68,000 by April 12. David announced that he would begin a Patreon account where he would publish new work, and which would be used to pay taxes, and asked his readers for their content requests. By May 11, having sold some original comics artwork acquired two decades earlier, the Davids' debts were paid off.

On November 27, 2022, another GoFundMe was launched by Graham Murphy, who explained David's health was once again in decline following kidney failure, another series of strokes, and a mild heart attack, in order to defray his "medical debt due to Peter being rejected for Medicaid." By May 20, 2025, David's inability to cough or clear his throat required him to be placed on a ventilator under light sedation. David died on the evening of May 24, at the age of 68, at NYU Langone Hospital — Suffolk, after a long hospitalization there for the strokes and other health conditions. According to Newsday, the cause of death was a cardiac event. The New York Times, citing his wife Kathleen, instead stated that David had died from another stroke. David was cremated and no services were held, although Kathleen planned to hold a memorial later in the year.

== Bibliography ==
Preceded by Cary Burkett	The Spectacular Spider-Man writer 1985–1988	Succeeded by Gerry Conway
Preceded by Al Milgrom	The Incredible Hulk vol. 2 writer 1987–1998	Succeeded by Joe Casey
Preceded by Chris Claremont	Wolverine vol. 2 writer 1989	Succeeded by Archie Goodwin
Preceded by Chris Claremont	X-Factor writer 1991–1993	Succeeded by Scott Lobdell
Preceded by n/a	Spider-Man 2099 writer 1992–1996	Succeeded by Ben Raab and Terry Kavanagh
Preceded by n/a	Aquaman vol. 4 writer 1994–1998	Succeeded by Dan Abnett and Andy Lanning
Preceded by Bruce Jones	The Incredible Hulk vol. 3 writer 2005	Succeeded by Daniel Way
Preceded by Jeff Jensen (Volume 2)	X-Factor writer 2005–2014	Succeeded by Leah Williams (Volume 4)
Preceded by Dan Slott	She-Hulk writer 2007–2009	Succeeded by Charles Soule (Volume 3)
