= I, Q (Star Trek novel) =

1999 novel by John de Lancie and Peter David

- Authors: John de Lancie; Peter David
- Language: English
- Series: Star Trek: The Next Generation
- Genre: Science fiction
- Publisher: Pocket Books
- Publication date: 1999
- Publication place: United States
- Media type: Print (paperback)
- Pages: 249 pp.
- ISBN: 0-671-02443-4
- OCLC: 42255401
- Dewey Decimal: 813/.54 21
- LC Class: PS3554.E114136 I7 1999

I, Q is a 1999 Star Trek novel by John de Lancie and Peter David. Set in the Star Trek: The Next Generation fictional universe, the novel depicts Q joining forces with Captain Jean-Luc Picard and Lieutenant Commander Data to save Picard’s wife and son and avert the end of the universe. It is the first novel to explore Q's parenthood. De Lancie, who played Q on several Star Trek television series, was the only Next Generation actor to write a novel based on his character.

== Plot summary ==
The novel opens with a mysterious Lady, who, having grown bored with contemplating the Universe, has decided to bring it to an end. She walks to the beach of the island where she lives alone, and summons a storm. As the storm builds up, a bottle washes up to the shore. The Lady picks up the bottle, takes out a manuscript it contains, and begins to read as the storm stands by and waits for her.

Q is deep-sea fishing (literally standing at the bottom of an ocean) with his wife Q and son q, when the ocean begins draining into a giant whirlpool. Q powerlessly watches as his wife and son are taken in, and is only barely able to escape. He arrives in the Holodeck of the Enterprise, where Picard and Data's fishing simulation had been disturbed by the same disaster.

In order to investigate what happened, Q takes Picard and Data to the Q Continuum, which they perceive as the fictional world of Dixon Hill. There, they learn that the Universe is ending, and that not only is the Q Continuum powerless to stop it, the Continuum actually welcomes the opportunity. Having explored all there is to explore and experienced all there is to experience, the Continuum is old and bored, and the end of the Universe is seen as a welcomed liberation. Q is unwilling to accept this decision, so the Continuum freeze him as a statue. With the help of Q2, Q escapes this punishment and the Continuum.

Q, Data and Picard return to the site of the whirlpool, to find it has calmed down and turned into a long shaft leading underground, which they proceed to explore.

The world down the shaft is actually five superposed worlds, each of which is a level of the Kübler-Ross model of the five stages of grief, populated by members of the multiverse with the appropriate reaction to the end of the universe. Q, Picard and Data go through each level, trying to reach the bottom. While exploring, Q contemplates his existence and that of the Q Continuum, the most powerful beings in existence, since he is convinced God does not exist. He reminisces on a young girl (Melony) he met in Times Square during the 2000 New Year party, in a parallel universe where he was posing as a human. She was insightful and intelligent, and when they kissed, Q thought she could almost feel his true power. In that universe, the celebration in Times Square was the target of a terrorist attack. Q, enraged by this senseless act, immediately puts out the fires and explosions, but not before Melony is killed. He later finds her body amongst the dead.

Level Denial. This level is populated with beings who try to ignore the fact the universe is ending, focusing instead on their more normal daily problems. Everyone is herded onto a train headed for oblivion, but no one believes it. Q, Picard, and Data battle Locutus in a race to uncouple the train before it incinerates every non-believing being on it.

Level Anger. Here, Q briefly encounters a parallel-universe version of Jadzia Dax who, following the events of "Blood Oath", chose not to return to Deep Space Nine but instead to continue fighting with Kang, Kor and Koloth. Together, the four of them are hunting the Romulans also present on this level, believing the whole thing to be some kind of Romulan ploy. However, Q realizes that the real culprit is his rival from the enemy M Continuum, who tries to blame him for the end of the universe. M stages a trial against Q in front of an infuriated jury, but Data wins the case by acting more angered than M and turning the jury against her.

Level Bargaining. This level is dominated by Grand Nagus Zek, who offers to trade whatever the other residents of the level own for empty promises of an afterlife. Q is finally reunited with his son q. However, q is now an adult, who has lived a long and depressed life believing his father had abandoned him to the whirlpool. After much trouble, Q manages to convince q that he never stopped trying to find him. Relieved, q reverts to his normal age.

The fourth level is Despair. On this level, Q finds his wife; however, she is so depressed that even seeing him is not enough for her to find something to live for, and she like the others on the level sinks into the mire.

After she dies, engulfed in despair, Q and the rest of the party enter a small house, which is the fifth and final level, Acceptance. The house consists of a large room with an unopenable door at the far end. When all the members of the party sit down and give up on trying to save the universe, the back wall of the room begins to close in on them. They struggle to push it back, but finally as Q accepts his fate the door flies open and he and q tumble through; Picard and Data are crushed.

Q finds himself and his son back in the Q Continuum, which is now seen as a New Year's Eve party, complete with a countdown to the end of the universe. It is the same as it was when he and Picard first arrived at the beginning of the quest. Q supposes that the whole quest was created to make him accept the inevitable. Q2 neither denies nor confirms this, instead offering that the Q Continuum is very much in the dark about all this and that, possibly, they had nothing to do with his adventure.

When the countdown reaches zero, the whirlpool starts anew, and the Q Continuum is pulled into it without a fight. q tries to hold on to his dad, but he's pulled in too. Q however resists the pull, refusing to accept that it is the end. He creates a written record of his journey and puts it in a bottle, which he throws into the whirlpool.

The story cuts back to the beach, where the Lady finishes reading Q's manuscript. She laughs out loud, and decides to call off the storm. She then finds q, wakes him, and gives him a mud boat to return home. But before he leaves, she writes something on a piece of paper, puts it in Q's bottle and hands it to q, to give to his father.

Back in the holodeck, Picard, Data, Q and his wife awaken in the simulated fishing boat. They spot q's mud boat, and Picard orders the computer to "end program". Everything disappears, except for the five individuals and q's boat. q tells his father of the island and the Lady, whom Q recognizes as the girl he met in Times Square. q then gives Q the bottle containing the Lady's message, but Q is too scared to open it. He hands it to Picard, who opens it and reads the message: "Let there be light".

== Reception ==
Publishers Weekly praised the inventive storytelling, but was critical of pace noting that "Q's egotistical ramblings, which work so well on screen, can drag on here."

== Associated Star Trek plots ==
Q became a father in the Star Trek: Voyager episode "The Q and the Grey." His son Q returned in another Voyager episode, "Q2", during which the younger Q wrote an essay also titled "I, Q."

== See also ==
- Q-in-Law
- Q-Squared
- Star Trek: The Q Continuum
