= Q2 (Star Trek: Voyager) =

- Star Trek: Voyager episode
- Q Junior, Q Senior and Janeway
- Episode no.: Season 7 Episode 19
- Directed by: LeVar Burton
- Story by: Kenneth Biller
- Teleplay by: Robert J. Doherty
- Cinematography by: Marvin V. Rush
- Production code: 265
- Original air date: April 11, 2001

Guest appearances
- John de Lancie - Q; Keegan de Lancie - Q Junior; Manu Intiraymi - Icheb; Michael Kagan - Chokuzan Commander; Lorna Raver - Q-Judge; Anthony Holiday - Nausicaan; Scott Davidson - Bolian; Tarik Ergin - Lt. Ayala (uncredited)

Episode chronology
← Previous "Human Error"	Next → "Author, Author"
- Star Trek: Voyager season 7

"Q2" is the 19th episode of the seventh season of the American science fiction television series Star Trek: Voyager. It initially aired on the UPN network as the 165th episode of the series, and was directed by Star Trek: The Next Generation castmember LeVar Burton (Geordi La Forge).

The series follows the adventures of the Federation starship Voyager during its journey home to Earth, having been stranded tens of thousands of light-years away. In this episode, Q (John de Lancie) stops by to leave his undisciplined son (Keegan de Lancie) (conceived at the end of "The Q and the Grey") in the care of his "godmother", Captain Janeway (Kate Mulgrew).

This episode marks the last on-screen live action appearance of "Q" until his 2022 return in season 2 of Star Trek: Picard, and features "Q" actor John de Lancie's real-life son Keegan as the young "Q".

This episode aired on the United Paramount Network (UPN) on April 11, 2001.

== Plot ==
Q (John de Lancie) shows up on USS Voyager to introduce Kathryn Janeway (Kate Mulgrew) to her godson, Q Junior (Keegan de Lancie), who now has the appearance of a human teenager. Q Junior is rambunctious and troublesome, causing various incidents across the ship. Q explains to Janeway that the Continuum hoped his son would help stabilize the Continuum but instead started the same type of problems on a much larger scale such as tearing holes in the fabric of space-time. The Continuum blamed Q and plans to turn Q Junior into an amoeba. Q brought him to Voyager to hopefully have Q Junior learn something. Janeway suggests some "father-son" time, but after ten minutes, Q admits that does not help as Q Junior had just rearranged the tectonic plates on a nearby planet. Janeway asserts that Q Junior needs to learn there are consequences for his actions.

By order of the Continuum, Q strips Q Junior of his powers and departs. Q Junior still manages to cause trouble, but after a stern talking-to by Janeway, he improves his ways, even becoming friends with Icheb (Manu Intiraymi). When Q returns, he appears to have little interest in Q Junior's progress before departing. Q Junior becomes depressed, and decides to take Icheb on a tour of the galaxy after stealing the Delta Flyer. They encounter a Chokuzan vessel that fires on them with a neural weapon that knocks Icheb unconscious. Q Junior races the Flyer back to Voyager, and pleads with the Doctor (Robert Picardo) to help find a cure for his friend. The Doctor is unable to identify how to cure Icheb, and Q refuses to save the life of someone his son put in danger, hoping that would teach him a lesson. When Janeway hears of this, she takes Q Junior along to locate the Chokuzan ship, hoping to learn how to heal Icheb. When they reach the ship, the Chokuzans demand someone bear punishment for the responsibility of the previous encounter. Janeway attempts to take responsibility as the captain of the ship, but Q Junior asserts it was his fault. Suddenly, it is revealed that this was all a ploy by Q; the Chokuzan ship never existed, and Icheb is restored to full health.

They return to Voyager where Q stands trial to the Continuum. They decide that while Q Junior has shown some improvement, he will still be exiled from the Continuum and left as a human forever. Q angrily departs following this decision. He returns later and speaks to Janeway, explaining that he told the Continuum that if they exiled his son, he would leave it too. Because of his importance to the stability of the Continuum, they had no choice but to restore Q Junior's powers, as long as Q took eternal custody of his son. Q Junior uses his powers to fill Janeway's ready room with roses before leaving as a token of thanks. Q also shows his appreciation to Janeway by giving her information to help shave a few years off their return trip to Earth. Though thankful for that, Janeway asks why Q did not take them all the way home, to which he replies that he would be setting a bad example for his son if he did all the work for her, before disappearing.

== Director ==
LeVar Burton directed this and several other episodes in this television series. He had also played Geordi La Forge in the series Star Trek: The Next Generation. Overall Burton would direct 8 episodes of Star Trek: Voyager.

== Reception ==
The episode was noted as tenth funniest episodes of the Star Trek franchise, by CBR in 2019. They note the performance by John de Lancie as Q, and the humor in that even an alien as powerful as Q struggles parenting a teenager.

Den of Geek included this episode on a binge watching guide that included a roadmap of episodes, that although not typically achieving high ratings, might still be entertaining.

In 2020, CBR ranked this episode the 8th best featuring Q. Also in 2020, ScreenRant ranked Q2 the 8th funniest episode of all Star Trek television.

In 2021, Tom's Guide said this was a "fun" episode and that it was entertaining to see Janeway discipline Q's son.

== Home media releases ==
On December 21, 2003, this episode was released on DVD as part of a Season 7 boxset; Star Trek Voyager: Complete Seventh Season.
