= Q-in-Law =

Novel by Peter David

- Front cover
- Author: Peter David
- Audio read by: Majel Barrett, John de Lancie
- Cover artist: Keith Birdsong
- Publisher: Pocket Books
- Publication date: September 1991
- Pages: 256
- ISBN: 0671733893
- Followed by: List of Star Trek novels
- Text: Q-in-Law at Internet Archive

Q-in-Law is a 1991 science fiction novel by American writer Peter David, part of the Star Trek: The Next Generation saga. It features Lwaxana Troi and Q. The book was ignored by the Star Trek office at Paramount, and apparently published only at the insistence of Majel Barrett, the actress who played Lwaxana on the television series, and was wife to its creator Gene Roddenberry.

== Plot ==
The Enterprise (NCC-1701-D) is assigned to diplomatic duty to host the wedding between two houses of the Tizarin, a race that lives only in space and engages in commerce. One of the guests is Lwaxana Troi, to represent Betazed. The time setting places it after the events of "Deja Q" (third season) and before "Q-Pid" (fourth season). Kerin, heir to the house of Nistral, will marry Sehra, the daughter of the house of Graziunas.

Q puts in an appearance. Although he toys with Picard while asking to be allowed to attend the wedding festivities, he promises to behave himself. Q attracts Lwaxana's notice, and she is fascinated by Q. To Picard's horror, Q fans the flames of love. Later, Q also begins to fan the animosity between the two Tizarin houses, mainly by feeding on the occasional blowups between the bride and groom, who are themselves irritated: Sehra by her future father-in-law Nistral's comments and Kerin by his future mother-in-law Mrs. Graziunas' comments.

The two families come to battle, and a despairing Lwaxana wishes she could do something. Q gives her power, and Lwaxana stops the battle, and Kerin and Serah determine they will marry, no matter what. Meanwhile, Q has revealed his true colors: another way of annoying lower life forms. He scorns Lwaxana, who gives Q a serious thrashing.

Meanwhile, a gift of gratitude by Sehra to Wesley Crusher turns out to be anything but a joy, as Sehra gives Wesley a clumsy slave girl. After much pain and a broken rib, Wesley returns the slave girl to Sehra, who had been trying to get rid of her but is now happy to have her back.

== Production ==
The audiobook version of the novel was read by Majel Barrett and John de Lancie, who would talk in character during the sequences with Lwaxana and Q.

== See also ==
- I, Q (Star Trek novel)
- Q-Squared
- Star Trek: The Q Continuum
