= The Squire of Gothos =

- Star Trek: The Original Series episode
- Episode no.: Season 1 Episode 17
- Directed by: Don McDougall
- Written by: Paul Schneider
- Cinematography by: Jerry Finnerman
- Production code: 018
- Original air date: January 12, 1967

Guest appearances
- William Campbell – Trelane; Richard Carlyle – Geophysicist Karl Jaeger; Michael Barrier – Lt. DeSalle; Venita Wolf – Yeoman Teresa Ross

Episode chronology
← Previous "The Galileo Seven"	Next → "Arena"
- Star Trek: The Original Series season 1

"The Squire of Gothos" is the 17th episode of the first season of the American science-fiction television series Star Trek. Written by Paul Schneider and directed by Don McDougall, it first aired on January 12, 1967.

In the episode, the childish but powerful ruler of the planet Gothos captures the crew of the Enterprise for his own amusement.

== Plot ==
The USS Enterprise, under the command of Captain Kirk, is on an 8-day supply mission to Colony Beta VI. Passing through a "star desert", the ship encounters a rogue planet previously hidden from their sensors. As Lt. Sulu attempts to enter a course around the planet, he suddenly vanishes from the bridge, and Kirk vanishes a moment later.

First Officer Spock assumes that the two must have been taken to the planet, though sensor readings indicate the planet's atmosphere is lethal to most forms of life. The Enterprise then receives a strange message on a viewscreen in blackletter writing: "Greetings and Felicitations!", followed by "Hip hip hoorah. Tallyho!" Spock orders Chief Medical Officer Dr. McCoy, along with Lt. DeSalle and geophysicist Karl Jaeger, to form a landing party and conduct a search.

The landing party beams down and unexpectedly finds itself in a lush and breathable environment. They also come across what appears to be a medieval castle, within which they find Captain Kirk and Lt. Sulu, immobilized, along with a humanoid being who identifies himself as "General Trelane, retired", and invites everyone to stay as his guests on his world, which he calls Gothos; he also explains that his hobby is studying Earth history and still [wrongly] believes Earth is engaging in world conquest. McCoy's medical tricorder cannot detect this person as a living being.

Spock, meanwhile, manages to locate the landing party in a minute zone of breathable atmosphere, and beams everyone, except Trelane, back to the ship by locking onto every detectable lifeform in the area. Trelane, however, appears on the Enterprise's bridge, and brings the entire bridge crew down to the planet, including Spock, Communications Officer Lt. Uhura, and Yeoman Teresa Ross. Trelane invites his "guests" to partake of his food (which tastes like straw) and his brandy (which tastes like water). Spock reasons that Trelane knows only the forms of earth history and not the substance; the equivalent of someone 900 light years away from earth who is studying earth history through a telescope but having no concept that 400 years have passed.

Kirk's patience begins to wear thin, especially when Trelane dances with Yeoman Ross and changes her standard red uniform into an 18th-century ball gown. Kirk and Spock both notice that their host never strays far from a particular wall mirror; they surmise that the mirror is the source of his powers. To test this theory, Kirk provokes Trelane into a duel, and during the fight, he destroys the mirror and damages some strange machinery inside. The bridge crew then beams back to the Enterprise, but as the ship attempts to warp away, the planet Gothos keeps appearing in its path. Kirk finally orders the Enterprise into orbit and decides to beam down, alone.

On the planet, Kirk finds Trelane seated on a courtroom bench, dressed in the white wig and robes reminiscent of an English circuit judge. Trelane reads charges of "treason", "conspiracy", and "fomenting insurrection", and then, silencing Kirk's protests, condemns Kirk to death by hanging. Kirk, however, points out that Trelane could find a more stimulating alternative. Trelane suggests that Kirk be prey for a royal hunt, and Kirk agrees in return for the release of his ship. The hunt begins, and Kirk is eventually cornered at the castle entrance, but remains defiant – he slaps Trelane – tells him he has a lot to learn about life and breaks Trelane's sword. Suddenly two energy beings appear and call out to Trelane, ordering him to "come along", and lecturing him, as parents, for his misbehavior. He then disappears, and the two beings follow after apologizing to Kirk, who returns to the ship.

== Production ==
Writer Paul Schneider was inspired by seeing children play war, and originally intended the episode to be an antiwar statement.

Upon meeting Yeoman Ross, Trelane slightly misquotes Christopher Marlowe's 16th-century play Doctor Faustus: "Is this the face that launched a thousand ships, and burnt the topless towers of Ilium? Fair Helen, make me immortal with a kiss". The actual lines are: "Was this the face that launch’d a thousand ships, And burnt the topless towers of Ilium? Sweet Helen, make me immortal with a kiss!"

== Reception ==
Zack Handlen of The A.V. Club gave the episode an 'A' rating, describing the episode as "one of TOS's most deservedly iconic hours", and noting it as "wonderfully structured". William Campbell's guest-star role was described as "demanding, energetic, and endlessly delighted with himself." In 2012, they ranked it as one of top-10 "must-see" episodes of the original series.

In 2016, SyFy ranked guest star William Campbell's performance as Trelane, as the fifth-best guest star on the original series.

In 2018, Collider ranked this episode the 17th-best original series episode.

In 2019, the Edmonton Journal ranked this as having one of the top 10 Spock character moments, pointing out his line "I object to you. I object to intellect without discipline. I object to power without constructive purpose," in response to Trelane.

In 2020, ScreenRant ranked it as the 14th-best episode of TOS to rewatch. They note how initially the crew is exposed to what appears to 18th-century technology on the planet, but is then tormented by Trelane, who possesses incredible powers. The character Trelane is reported to have inspired the character Q, who was presented in Star Trek: The Next Generation. John de Lancie has stated in several interviews that his performance as Q was inspired by William Campbell's depiction of Trelane.

== Continuity ==
Trelane tells Kirk that he has been observing events that occurred on Earth 900 years earlier. Trelane mentions Napoleon (1769–1821), the Alexander Hamilton duel from 1804, and a Richard Strauss composition from 1880, and this has been interpreted as suggesting the episode was set in the 28th century at the earliest. However, later episodes and films placed Star Trek in the 23rd century.

Trelane appears in the Star Trek: Strange New Worlds episode "Wedding Bell Blues", set years prior to "The Squire of Gothos", portrayed by Rhys Darby. Near the end of this episode, a ball of light representing Trelane's parent rebuked him for his antics. That ball of light was voiced by John de Lancie, thus establishing Trelane as the juvenile son of Q and a member of the Q Continuum.

== Non-canonical Star Trek media ==
The similarity between Q and Trelane inspired writer Peter David to posit in his 1994 novel Q-Squared that Trelane is a member of the Q Continuum, and Q is his godfather. The novel's climax suggests he might be Trelane's actual father, though he denies it when Picard asks about it. In the novel, the name "Trelane" originated due to an alternate version of the young Q-entity operating among three "lanes" of alternate timelines simultaneously. This familial connection would later be made official in Strange New Worlds.

Trelane appears in the 1993 video game Star Trek: Judgment Rites episode "No Man's Land". The Enterprise is dispatched to search an area where several Federation starships have disappeared without explanation. When they arrive, Kirk and crew are confronted by Trelane, who now dresses and acts like a World War I German Fokker pilot and is revealed to have captured the missing ships using his powers so he can force them to participate in dogfights. After a battle with Trelane in his aircraft, Kirk and his crew are forced to once again match wits with the childish Baron in their hopes to rescue the ships.
