= Workforce (disambiguation) =

The Workforce is the labour pool used in employment.

Workforce may also refer to:

- Workforce Productivity, an economics/engineering field
- Workforce (brand), a brand of the American retailer The Home Depot
- Workforce (comics), a superhero team in the DC Comics Universe
- Workforce (horse), thoroughbred racehorse and 2010 Derby winner
- Workforce (Star Trek: Voyager), episode 162 and 163 of the 1995 American TV series Star Trek: Voyager
