= Star Trek: The Q Continuum =

Book by Greg Cox

- Author: Greg Cox
- Cover artist: Dru Blair
- Language: English
- Genre: Science fiction
- Publisher: Pocket Books
- Publication date: October 7, 2003
- Publication place: United States
- Media type: Print (Paperback)
- Pages: 368
- ISBN: 0-7434-9182-3
- OCLC: 53197141
- Preceded by: Pantheon
- Followed by: Worlds in Collision
- Website: startrekbooks.com

Star Trek: The Q Continuum is an omnibus edition of a three novel miniseries written by Greg Cox, based on the television series Star Trek: The Next Generation. The novels explore the history of the multi-dimensional being Q prior to his introduction in the 1987 episode "Encounter at Farpoint". The Science Fiction Book Club released a similar edition with a different cover in 1998, also titled The Q Continuum.

The edition is part of the Star Trek: Signature Edition (2003–04) series, published by Pocket Books. Included, is an interview of Cox by Kevin Dilmore.

== Production ==
The Q Continuum trilogy was conceived by John J. Ordover at Pocket Books. Cox lamented he was uncertain he had "nine-hundred pages" in him when offered the project. He accepted the task after rewatching all the episodes featuring Q.

Cox said, in Voyages of Imagination (2006), the poetry included in the novels was written by Karen Palinko. Several printings included a facsimile signature from the author.

The edition includes Q-Space, Q-Zone, and Q-Strike, which were originally published as The Next Generation, Books 47 – 49.

== Plot summary ==
A Betazoid scientist, Lem Faal, claims to have found a way to penetrate the Galactic Barrier. The Enterprise is sent to offer aid. They return to Delta Vega, where Gary Mitchell was transformed in a god-like being after exposure radiation from the barrier in "Where No Man Has Gone Before". After gaining an understanding of Faal's technology, Capt. Picard orders the Enterprise to the barrier. Q appears, warning Picard and Faal against breaking the barrier.

When asked why they should stop, Q takes Picard on a journey to the distant past—a young Q's distant past. With Riker in command, the Enterprise is attacked by the Calamarain, non-corporeal lifeforms introduced in the episode "Deja Q". Faal plots to complete his barrier breaking test, regardless of the consequences, eager to make his mark on the Universe.

While on his journey with Q, Picard discovers the truth: the barrier was constructed to protect the galaxy from a malevolent, near-omnipotent, entity known as 0. The entity had remorselessly ravaged several worlds 600,000 years prior. It had also tortured the Calamarain, almost compressing them all into a single point, before being stopped by the young Q.

A small portion of 0's consciousness had passed through the barrier a few years prior, and merged with Faal. He was promised immortality in exchange for opening the barrier. After 0 entered the galaxy, Q, other members of the Q Continuum, and the Calamarain, join forces to defeat it.

== Contents ==
All novels written by Greg Cox:

- Q-Space (1998)
- Q-Zone (1998)
- Q-Strike (1998)
- A Look Inside 'The Q Continuum' with Greg Cox, by Kevin Dilmore

== Reception ==
The omnibus was called "a marvelously funny and enlightening visit to the Star Trek universe" by reviewers at Readers Read. Fraser Ronald of SFReader, said the omnibus was "a more satisfying experience" than previous The Next Generation films, or many episodes of Enterprise, but there were caveats to issuing a full recommendation.

Cox responded to a fan question on TrekBBS about the omnibus with: "I remember writing [the novels] a trillion years ago."

== See also ==
- Encounter at Farpoint
- Deja Q
- All Good Things... (Star Trek: The Next Generation)
- I, Q (Star Trek novel)
- Q-Squared
- Q-in-Law
