= Star Trek: Borg =

1996 video game

- Developer: Simon & Schuster
- Publishers: Simon & Schuster
- Director: James L. Conway
- Producer: Dan Dugan
- Programmer: Peter Mackey
- Artist: Michael Mayer
- Writer: Hilary Bader
- Composers: Dennis McCarthy, Kevin Kiner
- Series: Star Trek
- Platforms: Mac OS, Windows
- Release: NA: November 18, 1996; EU: 1996
- Genre: Interactive movie
- Mode: Single-player

Star Trek: Borg is an interactive movie PC game and audiobook set in the Star Trek universe. It was written by Hilary Bader, directed by James L. Conway, and featured an original score by Dennis McCarthy. It was released in 1996 by Simon & Schuster for PC and Macintosh.

== Plot and gameplay ==
In the midst of a Borg invasion ten years after the Battle of Wolf 359, Starfleet Cadet Qaylan Furlong is given an opportunity by Q (John de Lancie) to go back in time and prevent his father Ralph's death in the historic battle.

Q sends Qaylan to the USS Righteous, an Excelsior-class ship on which Ralph is serving, just before the Battle of Wolf 359. Originally, the ship's security officer Coris Sprint was killed by a Borg intruder over four hours before the battle. Q gives Qaylan control of Sprint's body at this point, allowing him to change history. Since Sprint is Bijani (a heretofore unseen alien race) he has the ability to go into a "Bijani Pain Trance" which allows him to complete jobs even when feeling immense pain. This plot device later becomes an important part of the story. Meanwhile, Q takes over the role of Dr. Thaddeus Quint, whose personality is similar to Q's.

At several points throughout the game, the player (Qaylan) is given multiple choices about what actions should be taken in various situations. Each action has a correct choice and several wrong choices. If the wrong choice is made the game either ends (e.g., ship destruction), or is re-routed back to the choice point (e.g., told to try again). In cases where the game ends, Q will reset time and allow the player to try again. It is often necessary to fail (and die) in order to gain information and then utilize Q's power to "reset" time to put that information to use. If the player makes too many mistakes, however, Q becomes bored and the game ends.

Once the player has correctly completed all choices, Qaylan succeeds in disarming a BORG device implanted onto the ship's computer core. With the BORG device removed, the ship is about to head off to join The Federation at The Battle of Wolf 359, but is told the battle will be won without them. Q then reveals himself and expresses surprise at what Qaylan has accomplished. To preserve the timeline, he transports both the ship and crew 10 years into the future. The crew of the Righteous then leave to link up with the rest of Starfleet in repelling the new Borg invasion.

== Production ==
The script for the game was written by Hilary J. Bader; Bader began as Star Trek: The Next Generation (TNG) season 3 writing intern, and also wrote the TNG episodes "The Loss", "Hero Worship", and "Dark Page" (3 total for TNG). Bader went on to write for many children's cartoon shows and comic books, and also wrote for the computer game Star Trek: Klingon.

The live action segments of Star Trek: Borg were directed by James L. Conway and featured the return of John de Lancie as Q. The duo had previously worked together on the Star Trek: Voyager episode "Death Wish". The filming of the live action segments of the game took place at the same time as Star Trek: First Contact. Conway had been competing to direct that film against The Next Generation cast member Jonathan Frakes but lost out. However, Frakes did also direct the audiobook version of the game.

The USS Righteous sets are mostly redressed versions of the sets of the USS Voyager from the Star Trek: Voyager series, with the exception of the bridge, which was a redressed form of the bridge of the USS Excelsior as seen in the Voyager episode "Flashback".

Visual effects shots for this game were originally produced for the Star Trek: Deep Space Nine (DS9) pilot episode "Emissary" which also depicts the Battle of Wolf 359.

With the exception of Murray Rubinstein and some minor players, the entire cast has appeared on one or more of the Star Trek TV series. For example, Jeff Allin also guest-starred as a single parent in the TNG episode "Imaginary Friend"; John Cothran Jr. has played two different Klingon characters on TNG and DS9; and Marnie McPhail played one of the Enterprise-E crewmembers in Star Trek: First Contact (in which her character is also assimilated by the Borg).

The soundtrack to the game was later published by composer Dennis McCarthy on his own label in 2008.

== Reception ==
Chris Hudak gave the game 4.1/10 in his review for GameSpot, and said that Star Trek: Borg didn't live up to the potential of the source material. While he described de Lancie's performance as "superb" but "wasted here", he said that the game was a "quick-pick-a-path mess". Furthermore, he felt that due to the interactive movie elements of the gameplay, it didn't feel much like a game at all. However, Roy Bassave, writing for the Knight-Ridder media group and published in The Buffalo News praised the game and said that it had superior production values to the First Contact film.

Barbara Krasnoff, of Computer Shopper, found fault with the game's interface, saying that it was hard to get the game to accept mouse clicks when you needed to select a series of numbers. She overall found it lacked challenge as if you were to die, then you are resurrected without penalty, but thought that it would be well received by fans of the franchise. The review in The Boston Herald made it clear that the game would only be received positively by fans, saying that the gameplay moved "incredibly slow". It did praise the plot, stating that it was "interesting and offers some funny and trademark-Trek moments for even the mildest fan". It gave the game a score of two and a half out of five. The game was later called a "bright spot" of Star Trek gaming by James Lileks of the Minneapolis Star-Tribune.

In September 2017, PC Gamer ranked Star Trek: Borg among the best Star Trek games.
