= Death Wish (Star Trek: Voyager) =

- Star Trek: Voyager episode
- Episode no.: Season 2 Episode 18
- Directed by: James L. Conway
- Story by: Shawn Piller
- Teleplay by: Michael Piller
- Production code: 130
- Original air date: February 19, 1996

Guest appearances
- Raphael Sbarge – Michael Jonas; Peter Dennis – Isaac Newton; Maury Ginsberg – Maury Ginsberg; John de Lancie – Q; Jonathan Frakes – William Riker; Gerrit Graham – Q2/Quinn

Episode chronology
← Previous "Dreadnought"	Next → "Lifesigns"
- Star Trek: Voyager season 2

"Death Wish" is the 18th episode of the second season of the American science fiction television series Star Trek: Voyager, the 34th episode overall. The episode originally aired on UPN on February 19, 1996. The episode features a new member of the Q Continuum named Quinn, and appearances by Star Trek: The Next Generation alumni William Riker (Jonathan Frakes) and Q (John de Lancie).

== Plot ==
Voyager encounters a comet, inside which there is a single living being. It turns out to be a member of the Q Continuum (later designated as Quinn). Quinn thanks the Voyager crew for freeing him from his imprisonment, then tries to commit suicide. He survives (see omnipotence paradox) and instead causes all the males on Voyager to vanish.

Q himself appears and accuses Quinn of sending humans to the Delta Quadrant where they did not belong yet, then realizes all the men are missing and returns them. Quinn requests Federation asylum from Janeway when Q wants to re-impose the Q Continuum's sentence of imprisonment. Q laughs at the request for asylum (the two Q even going as far as an extreme hide-and-seek chase) but Janeway decides to hold a hearing on Quinn's request. Q reluctantly agrees to make Quinn human if he is granted asylum. He attempts to bribe Janeway throughout the episode, claiming that if she rules against Quinn, he'll send Voyager home; it is also hinted that he is infatuated with her.

During the hearing, Q summons witnesses to testify against Quinn's suicide. Another Q defends the justice system of the continuum. Sir Isaac Newton claimed that he was sitting beside Quinn when the apple struck his head (after Quinn stood up to leave, he jostled the tree, causing the apple to fall). Another witness, Maury Ginsberg, claims that if Quinn had not offered a ride in his jeep, he would have never made it to Woodstock, got the sound system working, and met his future wife. Finally, William Riker of the USS Enterprise denies any claim to have known Quinn at all, until Q shows Riker that Quinn had helped his family in the past: as a soldier in the American Civil War, Quinn carried a wounded Union officer, Colonel Thaddeus Riker, back from the front lines to safety – ultimately ensuring Will Riker's existence in the future. Once his testimony is concluded, Q sends Riker back to the Enterprise with no memory of his encounter - and unable to alert Starfleet as to the situation on Voyager.

Quinn's argument involves a representation of the Q Continuum, which appears as a road stretching around the entire planet with one rest stop, a country gas station and store, and some bored Q standing around. Quinn describes immortality as dull, explaining that it is only possible to experience the universe so many times before it gets boring. Q tries to dismiss it and makes a poor attempt to show that the other members of the continuum are happy, but Quinn sees through it and confesses, to Q's surprise, that it was Q's earlier unrestrained behavior in an attempt to make his life fun (which led to the events in "Deja Q") that was the motivation for his own actions. He makes an impassioned speech comparing his eternal boredom to suffering from a terminal biological disease for which suicide is the only humane release, and that being forced to live for eternity against his will "cheapens and denigrates" his life, and indeed all life. Janeway is clearly moved by this and agrees to grant him asylum. Keeping his part of the bargain begrudgingly, Q makes him human. At this point, Quinn chooses his name.

While trying to decide where to assign Quinn so that he will not use his knowledge to evolve humanity overnight, Janeway and Chakotay receive a message from the Doctor that Quinn is dying after ingesting a rare poison, Nogatch hemlock. After the Doctor states that he does not keep any of the poison on hand, and that the computer would not replicate it due to its harmful nature, Q then appears and admits that he was the one who gave Quinn the poison: he's taking up Quinn's rebellion against the staid order of the Q ("By demanding to end his life, he taught me a little something about my own. He was right when he said the Continuum scared me back in line. I didn't have his courage or his convictions. He called me irrepressible. This was a man who was truly irrepressible. I only hope I make a worthy student.").

== Reception ==
In 2012, Den of Geek ranked this as an honorable mention as a candidate for their ranking of the top ten episodes of Star Trek: Voyager. In 2017, Den of Geek ranked actor Gerrit Graham as the character featured in this episode, Quinn, as the best guest star on Star Trek: Voyager.

== See also ==
- Principle of double effect
- "Sons of Mogh", Deep Space Nine episode about request for execution
- "Ethics", The Next Generation episode about request for execution
- "Half a Life"
- "The Q and the Grey"
