= Hide and Q =

- Star Trek: The Next Generation episode
- Episode no.: Season 1 Episode 10
- Directed by: Cliff Bole
- Story by: C.J. Holland
- Teleplay by: C.J. Holland; Gene Roddenberry
- Cinematography by: Edward R. Brown
- Production code: 111
- Original air date: November 23, 1987

Guest appearances
- John de Lancie – Q; William A. Wallace – Wesley Crusher (age 25); Elaine Nalee as Female Survivor

Episode chronology
← Previous "The Battle"	Next → "Haven"
- Star Trek: The Next Generation season 1

"Hide and Q" is the tenth episode of the first season of the American science fiction television series Star Trek: The Next Generation, and originally aired on November 23, 1987, in broadcast syndication. The story was originally written by Maurice Hurley but went under numerous re-writes by the show's creator Gene Roddenberry. The episode was directed by Cliff Bole, and saw the return of John de Lancie as the mischievous omnipotent entity known as Q.

Set in the 24th century, the series follows the adventures of the Starfleet crew of the USS Enterprise (NCC-1701-D). In this episode, Q returns to the Enterprise (after his original encounter with the crew in "Encounter at Farpoint") to offer the Enterprise's executive officer Commander Riker the powers of the Q.

Writer Maurice Hurley requested and later regretted that he be credited under the pseudonym C.J. Holland in protest against Roddenberry's re-writes. The problems with the scripting of the episode changed the way the staff handled subsequent script developments for the series. Bole subsequently praised the abilities of de Lancie during the course of filming the episode. Reviewers thought that while the episode was predictable, the relationship between Q and Picard (Patrick Stewart) was praised, and "Hide and Q" received average overall scores.

== Plot ==
The Enterprise is en route to Quadra Sigma to aid colonists caught in a methane explosion when Q reappears and demands that they abandon their mission to compete in a game. He teleports Commander Riker and the bridge crew, with the exception of Captain Picard, to a barren landscape, stating that the rule of the game is to stay alive. Yar (Denise Crosby) protests, and Q transports her back to the bridge of the Enterprise in a "penalty box", warning that only one player can be in the box at a time and she will cease to exist should another player replace her.

Q returns to the bridge shortly after to propose a wager to Picard, explaining that the Q Continuum is testing Commander Riker to see if he is worthy of being granted their god-like powers. If Riker accepts them, Q wins command of the starship; if he refuses them, Picard makes Q promise to never interfere with humanity again. Meanwhile, Riker and his team are attacked by what Lt. Worf reports as "vicious animal things" dressed as Napoleonic soldiers wielding energy-firing muskets. Q returns to Riker and tells him that he has granted him the powers of the Continuum. Riker uses them to return his crew mates to the ship, but he remains behind to question Q’s intentions. Q explains that he and his kind are interested in humanity because of their potential for growth and evolution, suggesting that humanity could eventually surpass the Q. Q wishes for Riker to accept the powers and become part of the Q Continuum so they can understand the human "compulsion" for growth. Riker rejects this, and in response, Q teleports the bridge crew back to the surface, unarmed. The crew are attacked once more by the soldiers, and both Worf and Wesley Crusher are killed. Riker uses the powers of the Q to return the crew to the Enterprise again, bringing both Worf and Wesley back to life.

Riker makes a promise to Picard never to use the powers again and the ship arrives at Quadra Sigma. A rescue team beams down and discovers a young girl who has died. Riker is tempted to save her, but in the end he refuses to do so out of respect for his promise; however, he quickly shows signs of regret at this decision, which he expresses to the captain. Tensions rise as Riker's behavior towards his captain and crew change and he becomes continually tempted to use his powers. At Q's suggestion, and with Picard's blessing, Riker uses his powers to give his friends what he believes they want: he turns Wesley into an adult, offers to make Data (Brent Spiner) human, gives La Forge (LeVar Burton) his sight, and creates a Klingon female companion for Worf. Ultimately, however, all the recipients reject their gifts. Picard declares that Q has failed, and when Q attempts to go back on his word, he is forcibly recalled to the Continuum. Picard is pleased to see Q gone, and praises Riker for confirming his trust in his "Number One".

== Production ==
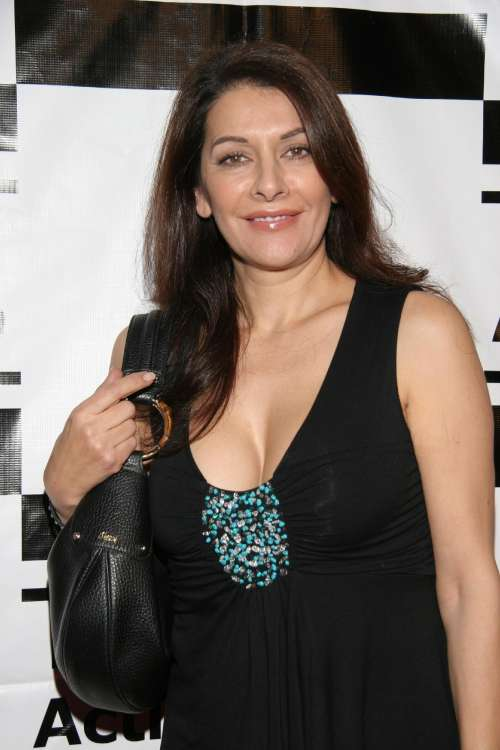
The absence of her character in this and other episodes in season one led Marina Sirtis to believe she was being cut from the show.

Writer Maurice Hurley requested that his contributions to this episode appear under the name of C.J. Holland because of the number of extensive re-writes by the show's creator Gene Roddenberry. Hurley later described the situation as a "misunderstanding" as the situation was subsequently resolved and proved to be a turning point for the series in how scripts were produced. Subsequently Roddenberry spent less time conducting detailed re-writes. Some of the elements of Hurley's original story expanded on the back story of Q's species, explaining that there were only three Qs but another hundred thousand residents on their planet who required relocation as the planet was dying. These elements didn't subsequently make it into any future episodes.

The episode marked the return of John De Lancie as Q. Cliff Bole was returning as a director for the series, and knowing that de Lancie would appear as Q, Bole watched "Encounter at Farpoint" in order to maintain Q's tone. He found after shooting began that his research wasn't required as de Lancie slotted back into his previous role naturally. Bole later described the episode as "a lot of fun" and de Lancie as "a joy and a creative guy to work with". De Lancie would next return in the second season episode "Q Who". Meanwhile, the removal of the character of Deanna Troi from this episode alongside three other episodes made actress Marina Sirtis believe at the time that she was about to be cut from the show. Elaine Nalee guest starred as a female survivor, while William A. Wallace appeared as the adult Wesley Crusher.

The theme of the episode, where a humanoid gains the powers of a god, is a recurring theme from Star Trek: The Original Series, having featured in several episodes including the second pilot "Where No Man Has Gone Before" and "Charlie X". The most similar episode from TOS is "Plato's Stepchildren", where the character Alexander also rejects god-like powers in a similar manner to Riker in "Hide and Q". The premise would once again be revisited in the season six episode "True Q".

== Reception ==
Jean-Luc Picard: Ohh, I know Hamlet! And what he might say with irony, I say with conviction! What a piece of work is man! How noble in reason, how infinite in faculty! In form and moving how express and admirable! In action how like an angel, in apprehension how like a god!
Q: Surely you don't see your species like that, do you?
Picard:I see us one day becoming that, Q. Is it that which concerns you?

— "Hide and Q", 1987

"Hide and Q" aired in broadcast syndication during the week commencing November 22, 1987. It received Nielsen ratings of 11.0, reflecting the percentage of all households watching the episode during its timeslot. This was higher than both the episodes broadcast before and afterwards.

This episode was noted for the use of Shakespeare in the Star Trek franchise, in particular when Captain Picard talks to the Q entity.

Several reviewers re-watched Star Trek: The Next Generation after the end of the series. Keith DeCandido for Tor.com thought that the plot was predictable, describing Riker being written as "so paint-by-numbers the color is practically dripping off the screen". He praised the relationship between Q and Picard, stating that de Lancie was having such "fun with the role that the episode itself is also fun despite its flaws". He gave "Hide and Q" a score of five out of ten. Zack Handlen re-watched the episode for The A.V. Club, and thought it was an example of where TNG avoided characterisation in favour of a morality play. He thought that the episode was a mess, with the highlights being Picard reciting Shakespeare and the Napoleonic monsters. He rated the episode as a C−.

Star Trek: The Next Generation actor Wil Wheaton reviewed the episode for the Huffington Post after the end of the series, describing John de Lancie in his role of Q as "brilliant casting and masterful acting", and thought that overall the episode was reminiscent of the original series and had some good points. However, he thought the script had the characters lecturing the viewer on occasion, based on the idea that ultimate power will lead to corruption. He gave the episode a score of B−.

== Home media release ==
The first home media release of "Hide and Q" was on VHS cassette on July 1, 1992. This episode was released in the "Q Continuum" collection of LaserDisc. The collection was released on July 30, 1997 and was published by Paramount Home Video; it retailed for 100 USD. The set included the 2-part "Encounter at Farpoint", "Hide and Q", "Q Who", and "Deja Q" on 12 inch optical discs in NTSC format with a total runtime of 230 minutes. The collection came in a Tri-Fold jacket that also included a letter from actor Jon De Lancie. The episode was later included in the Star Trek: The Next Generation season one DVD box set, released in March 2002, and in the Star Trek: Q DVD box set from the fan collection series of sets. It was released as part of the season one Blu-ray set on July 24, 2012.
