= Q-Squared =

Novel by Peter David

- Cover of the first edition
- Author: Peter David
- Cover artist: Keith Birdsong
- Language: English
- Series: Star Trek: The Next Generation
- Genre: Science fiction
- Publisher: Pocket Books
- Publication date: July 1994
- Publication place: United States
- Media type: Print (Hardcover, Paperback)
- ISBN: 0-671-89151-0
- OCLC: 32912868

Q-Squared (full title Star Trek: The Next Generation – Q-Squared) is a non-canon Star Trek novel by Peter David. It spent five weeks on the New York Times bestseller list in 1994.

Q-Squared was released in July 1994 as one in a series of "Giant Novels" for the Star Trek line from Pocket Books. Although the novel was primarily based on and around the characters of Star Trek: The Next Generation, this book was particularly notable for bringing together the characters of Q from Star Trek: The Next Generation and Trelane from Star Trek: The Original Series.

== Plot ==
Trelane, who first appeared in the original Star Trek episode "The Squire of Gothos", is revealed to be a member of the Q Continuum. He taps into the power of the Continuum and uses this ability to tamper with time and reality, resulting in the intersection of three different parallel universes which are also referred to as time "tracks". Track A is a universe in which Beverly Crusher's husband Jack never died, and now serves as captain of the Enterprise with Jean-Luc Picard as his first officer; in this universe, Jack's son Wesley died as a boy and Jack and Beverly divorced. Track B is the traditional universe depicted on Star Trek: The Next Generation. Track C is akin to the more militaristic alternate universe shown in the Next Generation episode "Yesterday's Enterprise", in which the Federation is at war with the Klingons.

Q, who had been charged with the task of "mentoring" Trelane (a task each "adult" Q must accept at least once for an "adolescent" Q), enlists the help of Picard and the crew of the Enterprise-D in the three different timelines in order to teach Trelane discipline, and eventually, to stop him from destroying the fabric of the universe by collapsing the alternate universes together.

When the tracks begin to merge, the characters from separate universes begin to appear to one another, sometimes with disastrous results. The Tashas of Track A and C encounter each other, with Tasha-A reacting with amazement at her C counterpart's harsh appearance; Jack Crusher confronts his ex-wife about the affair she is having with Track-A Picard; during the argument, which Track-B Picard witnesses, she is accidentally killed; additionally, members of Track C attempt to kill Worf, and believe all the members of the crew from the other two universes are really Klingon impostors.

Eventually, Q manages to overpower Trelane and the universes are once again separated, though not always perfectly (at the end of the novel, Track-A Data appears to be stuck in Track C).

Q also spends part of the novel lost in time and space, trapped by the barrier around the galaxy; this relates to the original series episode "Where No Man Has Gone Before".

== Parallel universes ==
The plot of this novel continually shifts among three different parallel universes, or 'Tracks', each identified by a letter:

- Track B is the normal Star Trek universe.
- Track A is a variation of the Trekverse, with several differences:
  - James Kirk's middle initial is R (as shown in the original series episode "Where No Man Has Gone Before", which apparently takes place in the Track A universe as James Kirk's middle initial is usually T).
  - Jack Crusher, who did not die under Picard's command, is commanding officer of the Enterprise-D. He and Beverly are divorced; their son Wesley died in an accident while still a toddler.
  - Geordi La Forge is a nurse in sickbay with cloned eye implants instead of his VISOR.
  - Jean-Luc Picard, broken in rank by a court martial after his failure to defend the Stargazer at Maxia, is Enterprise's first officer. He and Beverly become romantically involved, with disastrous results when Jack discovers their affair.
  - Data is a "human-oid" (a positronic brain in an organic body), and is engaged in an ongoing affair with Tasha Yar.
  - William Riker and Kira Nerys have been prisoners of the Romulan Star Empire for several years. Riker and Deanna Troi were married prior to his capture, and have a son who has never met his father.
  - Worf was not adopted by a Federation couple; instead, he was raised in the Klingon Empire as a warrior. He rescues Riker and Kira and kills their Romulan overseers.
- Track C is a variant of the "Klingon war" timeline as seen in "Yesterday's Enterprise", but one in which the Enterprise-D came across the Enterprise-C several hours after it passed into the future, and thus could not be sent back to Narendra III in 2344 to prevent the war with the Klingons (the rift had closed and the Enterprise-C's crew were all dead).

In addition, the final chapter of the book is called 'Derailment', in which the various realities coalesce into a single timeline. This chapter ties all of the plots visited over the length of the book together, concluding with Q's final confrontation with the now-deranged Trelane.

== Q connections ==
The role of Q was originated by John de Lancie in the first episode of Star Trek: The Next Generation, "Encounter at Farpoint". John de Lancie also provided the reading of the novel in the audiobook edition.

Peter David previously wrote the novel Q-in-Law for Pocket Books. This novel also featured the main character of Q and was based in the continuity of Star Trek: The Next Generation.

== Cultural references ==
In one sequence of the novel, Trelane brings to life the character of Winnie the Pooh, who was originally created by A. A. Milne and is perhaps best known through the films, television series, and merchandise produced by Disney.

In the universe of Track A, the bartender in Ten-Forward is named Caryn Johnson, replacing the usual character Guinan. In real life, Caryn Johnson is the birth name of Whoopi Goldberg, who played Guinan on Star Trek: The Next Generation.

== See also ==
- I, Q (Star Trek novel)
- Q-in-Law
- Star Trek: The Q Continuum
