= Keegan de Lancie =

American actor (born 1984)

- Born: John Keegan de Lancie; October 31, 1984 (age 41); Los Angeles, California, U.S.
- Education: University of North Carolina
- Occupation: Actor
- Years active: 1990–2001
- Father: John de Lancie Jr.
- Relatives: John de Lancie Sr. (grandfather)

John Keegan de Lancie (born October 31, 1984) is an American former actor. He is the son of actor John de Lancie and Marnie Mosiman. He is known for playing "Q Junior", the son of his father's recurring Star Trek character Q in the 2001 Star Trek: Voyager episode "Q2". He has also appeared in TV shows such as Ally McBeal and The Drew Carey Show.

In 2011, de Lancie worked for the International Organization for Migration, where he monitored Iraqi Christians seeking refuge through their movements to Iraq's Kurdish regions. In 2014, he became a member of the U.S. Foreign Service.

== Filmography ==
Year	Film	Role	Notes
1990	Alexander, Who Used to Be Rich Last Sunday	Young Boy	
1994	The Time Machine	Eloi	(audio drama)
1994	Exit to Eden (film)	Son	Uncredited
1997	The Drew Carey Show	Choir Boy	Episode "Vacation"
1999	The Velocity of Gary	Choir Boy	
1999	Ally McBeal	Kirby Gallin	Episode "Seeing Green"
2001	Star Trek: Voyager	Q Junior	Episode "Q2"
