= Where No Man Has Gone Before =

- Star Trek: The Original Series episode
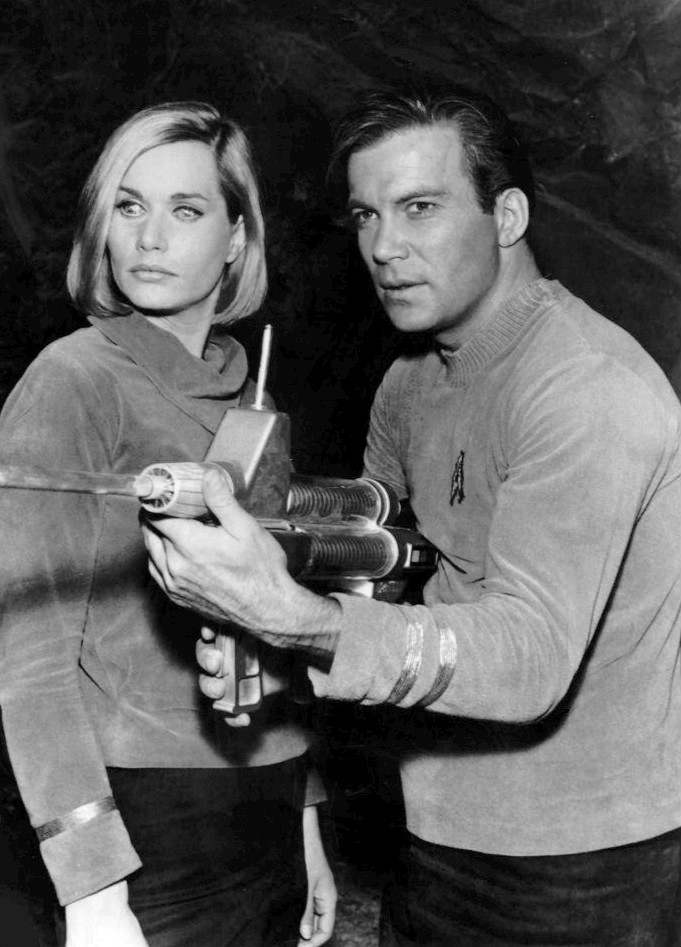
- Sally Kellerman as Dr. Elizabeth Dehner and William Shatner as Capt. Kirk.
- Episode no.: Season 1 Episode 3
- Directed by: James Goldstone
- Written by: Samuel A. Peeples
- Cinematography by: Ernest Haller
- Production code: 2
- Original air date: September 22, 1966

Guest appearances
- Gary Lockwood – Lt. Cmdr. Gary Mitchell; Sally Kellerman – Dr. Elizabeth Dehner; Lloyd Haynes – Alden; Andrea Dromm – Yeoman Smith; Paul Carr – Lt. Lee Kelso; Paul Fix – Dr. Mark Piper

Episode chronology
| ← Previous "Charlie X" | Next → "The Naked Time" |
- Star Trek: The Original Series season 1

"Where No Man Has Gone Before" is the third episode of the first season of the American science-fiction television series Star Trek. Written by Samuel A. Peeples and directed by James Goldstone, it first aired on September 22, 1966.

In the episode, after the USS Enterprise attempts to cross the energy barrier at the edge of the galaxy, two crew members develop powerful ESP abilities that threaten the safety of the crew.

The episode was the second pilot, produced in 1965 after the first pilot, "The Cage", was rejected by NBC. Reportedly, Lucille Ball, who owned Desilu Productions (where the pilot was produced), persuaded NBC management to consider a second pilot, thereby exercising a special option agreement it had with Desilu, because she liked Gene Roddenberry and believed in the project. The episode was eventually broadcast third in sequence, and it was the first episode to be shown in the United Kingdom by the BBC on July 12, 1969.

"Where No Man Has Gone Before" was the first produced episode of Star Trek to feature William Shatner as Captain James Kirk, James Doohan as Chief Engineer Montgomery Scott, and George Takei as Lt. Sulu (in this episode, the ship's astro scientist, whose character became helmsman in subsequent episodes). The episode also guest stars Sally Kellerman (prior to her role in M*A*S*H) as Dr. Elizabeth Dehner, the ship’s psychiatrist. The episode title is the final phrase in the opening voice-over, which characterizes the series and has entered popular culture.

== Plot ==
The USS Enterprise is on an exploratory mission to leave the galaxy. En route, a damaged ship's recorder of the SS Valiant, an Earth spaceship lost 200 years earlier, is found. Its record is incomplete, but it reveals that the Valiant had been swept from its path by a "magnetic space storm," and that the crew had frantically searched for information about extrasensory perception (ESP) in the ship's library computer. The recording ends with the captain of the Valiant apparently giving a self-destruct order.

Captain Kirk decides that they need to know what happened to the Valiant, and the Enterprise crosses the edge of the galaxy. There, it encounters a strange barrier that damages the ship's systems and warp drive, forcing a retreat. At the same time, nine crew members are killed and both helmsman Gary Mitchell (Gary Lockwood) and the ship's psychiatrist Dr. Elizabeth Dehner (Sally Kellerman) are knocked unconscious by the barrier's effect. When he awakens, Mitchell's eyes glow silver, and he begins to display remarkable psychic powers.

Mitchell becomes increasingly arrogant and hostile toward the rest of the crew, declaring that he has become godlike, enforcing his desires with displays of telepathic and telekinetic power.

Science Officer Spock comes to believe that the Valiant crew members might have experienced the same phenomenon, and destroyed their ship to keep the power from spreading. He advises Kirk that Mitchell may have to be killed before his powers develop further, but Kirk angrily disagrees - although he accepts Spock's alternate suggestion to maroon Mitchell at a completely automated lithium cracking facility on the remote planet of Delta Vega. Once there, the landing party tries to confine Mitchell, but his powers have become too great. He kills navigator Lee Kelso by telekinetically garroting him and escapes by knocking out Kirk and Spock, taking with him Dr. Dehner, who has now developed ESP powers of her own.

Kirk follows and appeals to Dr. Dehner's humanity for help. Before Mitchell can kill Kirk, Dehner attacks him using her powers and weakens him. Mitchell fatally injures Dehner, but before he can recover from the effort, Kirk uses a phaser rifle to create a rock slide, killing Mitchell.

Back on the Enterprise, Kirk makes a log entry that both Dehner and Mitchell gave their lives "in performance of duty". He explains to Spock that he wants his friend's service record to end positively: "He didn't ask for what happened to him."

== Production and casting ==
The original pilot of Star Trek, "The Cage", was rejected in February 1965 by NBC executives. The show had been sold to them as a "Wagon Train to the stars", and they thought the first pilot did not match the adventure format they had been promised and was "too cerebral" for the general audience. However, NBC, having been persuaded by Desilu management (and reportedly by Lucille Ball herself), maintained sufficient interest in the format to order a second pilot episode in March 1965.

Roddenberry wrote two story outlines, "The Omega Glory" and "Mudd's Women". He wrote the teleplay for the former and gave the latter to Stephen Kandel. Roddenberry asked long-time associate and veteran scriptwriter Samuel Peeples to submit ideas for another. Peeples came up with the premise and episode title for "Where No Man Has Gone Before", and was assigned to write it. Roddenberry rewrote Peeples's script several times. While he enjoyed working with Roddenberry, after seeing the pilot Peeples preferred his original version of the script. There was some discussion over who came up with the title "Where No Man Has Gone Before"; Peeples stated unequivocally that it was his idea, and not Roddenberry's.

Kandel had fallen ill and his script was not finished in time; the other two were submitted to NBC for consideration. NBC preferred "Where No Man Has Gone Before" as a pilot. "Mudd's Women" was later made as the second episode in regular production, and "The Omega Glory" was made towards the end of the second season.

Casting took place in June 1965. Jeffrey Hunter was unwilling to reprise his role as Captain Christopher Pike. Lloyd Bridges and Jack Lord were considered, but William Shatner was finally cast as Pike's replacement, Captain James Kirk. The character of Number One, the female second-in-command, was dropped on the insistence of the NBC network, and Science Officer Spock was given Number One's unemotional demeanor. NBC was worried about Leonard Nimoy's "satanic" appearance and pressured for his removal. As Roddenberry later explained at conventions, he felt he had a strong enough negotiating position to save one character, but not both. Roddenberry went on to muse that, had he done it the other way around, he could not have then married the losing actor (Majel Hudec, who changed her surname to Barrett and returned in the role of Christine Chapel). Kirk, who became "James T. Kirk" for the main series, is "James R. Kirk" here, according to the gravestone Mitchell prepares for him on the planet.

Apart from Captain Kirk, the episode introduced two other regular characters to the show: James Doohan, a friend of director James Goldstone, was cast as the Chief Engineer Montgomery Scott (the name chosen after Doohan had tried various accents, and had decided that an engineer ought to be Scottish) and George Takei was cast as the ship's physicist. Sulu would become the helmsman in the regular series. Lieutenant Uhura and Dr. Leonard McCoy do not feature; the ship's doctor is instead Mark Piper (Paul Fix), who lost the role to DeForest Kelley.

Gary Lockwood, as Lt. Commander Gary Mitchell, had starred in the title role of Roddenberry's earlier series on NBC, The Lieutenant; Sally Kellerman was cast as Dr. Elizabeth Dehner. Both actors needed silver eyes and scleral lenses were called for, which were produced by expert contact lens fabricator, John Roberts, who laminated wrinkled tinfoil between layers of the scleral lenses which covered the entire eye. These, outdated by the 1960s, could be painful, perhaps dangerous to the actors' eyes (modern scleral lenses can "breathe" and are oxygen permeable). Although Kellerman could insert and remove the prosthetics easily with no discomfort, Lockwood found them difficult to see through. He needed to raise his face and sight along his nose in order to see through tiny holes in the foil. He was able to use this to enhance his performance as the mutating Mitchell, the unusual gaze giving him an arrogant and haughty demeanor.

Other cast members included Paul Carr as Navigator Lee Kelso, Lloyd Haynes as Communications Officer Alden and Andrea Dromm as Yeoman Smith (Alden and Smith were intended to be regulars in the show, but were replaced by Uhura and Janice Rand, respectively). The episode also is the first time long-running background actor Eddie Paskey appeared; his character would later be identified as Lt. Leslie.

The costumes from the first pilot were used in "Where No Man Has Gone Before" with the exception of the insignias in two respects – the outlines were gold in the first pilot but black in the second, and the insignia symbols for engineering and sciences were reversed for the series proper. Completely new uniforms and insignia would be unveiled when the series was approved, with the colors altered and black collars introduced. Most of the Enterprise sets were also reused from "The Cage", while Sickbay was the only major set constructed for the episode. Like "The Cage", the episode was shot at Desilu's Culver City studios.

The episode was directed by James Goldstone. He was hired primarily to get his opinion on which of the first three scripts should be the second pilot. While his best friend Stephen Kandel wrote "Mudd's Women", Goldstone agreed "Where No Man Has Gone Before" was the right choice. Ernest Haller, who had won the Oscar for Best Color Cinematography on the movie Gone with the Wind (1939), served as director of photography for the episode. He had been brought in out of semi-retirement at Goldstone's recommendation at the last minute, after attempts to locate a cameraman had proved problematic. Robert H. Justman was credited as assistant director.

Shooting started on July 19, 1965, several days later than originally scheduled. During the filming of this episode, a wasp's nest high in the rafters of the studio was somehow disturbed, and many cast and crew members suffered stings as a result. As this happened on a Friday, the weekend break allowed time for the swelling to go down; Shatner, however, required additional makeup to hide the stings during shooting the following Monday. Filming finished late on July 28, 1965; the final footage filmed was part of the fight between Kirk and Mitchell. While the schedule allowed seven days to shoot the episode, it required nine, which was Justman's original estimate. The episode cost around $300,000, around half the money spent on making "The Cage".

In a 1988 TV special, The Star Trek Saga: From One Generation to the Next, series creator Gene Roddenberry said that, as with the first pilot, this one still had a lot of science fiction elements in it, but at least it ended with Kirk in a bare-knuckle fistfight with Mitchell and that's what sold NBC on Star Trek.

== Original cut ==
Post-production on the episode was delayed by Roddenberry's involvement in another pilot, Police Story. Post-production finished in January 1966 and the episode was presented to NBC for approval (which finally came in February 1966). This original version (production number 02a) differed from the later final broadcast cut (production number 02b, airing on September 22, 1966) in that each of the four acts had on-screen titles ("Act I", "Act II", etc.), as well as an epilogue. It also featured a much longer opening narration by Shatner. In some places alternate musical scores were used. In total almost five minutes of footage was removed to accommodate the original series' 50-minute network broadcast format to allow for commercials. The episode in its original version was seen by the public before the aired version, having been shown at the 24th World Science Fiction Convention in Cleveland, Ohio, on September 3, 1966—shortly before the premiere broadcast of Star Trek on NBC.

The studio did not retain a print of this original version, and it was officially thought to be lost. In 2009, a German film collector discovered a print of it and brought it to the attention of CBS/Paramount, which then released it under the title "Where No Fan Has Gone Before" – The Restored, Unaired Alternate Pilot Episode as part of the TOS season 3 box set on Blu-ray.

== Non-canonical related works ==
The episode was adapted into a short story by James Blish for Star Trek 8, published by Bantam in 1972. It also became the second in Bantam's series of Fotonovels, published in 1977.

=== Non-canonical books ===
The Galactic Barrier is later associated with the Q in the 1994 novel Q-Squared by Peter David and the 1998 Star Trek: The Q Continuum trilogy by Greg Cox.

Gary Mitchell does not appear again in the show. Several books, including Michael Jan Friedman's My Brother's Keeper, Vonda N. McIntyre's Enterprise: The First Adventure, and Margaret Wander Bonanno's Strangers from the Sky, feature the character in adventures set before the events of the episode. The 2005 Star Trek: Vanguard book Harbinger is set immediately after the events of "Where No Man Has Gone Before" and features a troubled Kirk musing on his friend's death. Friedman's Stargazer book The Valiant features two people who claim to be descended from the Valiant's crew.

=== Non-canonical mini-series ===
Gary Mitchell (portrayed by Daamen J. Krall) appears in the alternate timeline depicted in the 2006-2008 mini-series Star Trek: Of Gods and Men.

=== 765874 – Unification ===
Gary Lockwood returned to the role of Gary Mitchell in the 2024 short film, 765874 – Unification, appearing to use his godlike powers to help Kirk reunite with Spock in his dying moments.

== Reception ==
In 2013, Wired magazine ranked this episode one of the top ten episodes of the original television series. They note famous lines such as Kirk's plea for compassion, and the absence of series regulars such as Dr. McCoy, Uhura, and Chekov.

Zack Handlen of The A.V. Club gave the episode a 'B+' rating, describing it as "an awkward episode" but that "it's not without its charms."

In 2016, IGN ranked "Where No Man Has Gone Before" number six in a top ten list of original series episodes. They also ranked it the 17th best episode of all Star Trek series.

In 2018, PopMatters ranked this the 4th best episode of the original series.

== Releases ==
"Where No Man Has Gone Before" was released on PAL-format LaserDisc in the United Kingdom as part of The Pilots collection, in April 1996. This included the color version of "The Cage", "Where No Man Has Gone Before", "Encounter at Farpoint", "Emissary", and "Caretaker" with a total runtime of 379 minutes.
