= Author, Author (Star Trek: Voyager) =

- Star Trek: Voyager episode
- Episode no.: Season 7 Episode 20
- Directed by: David Livingston
- Story by: Brannon Braga
- Teleplay by: Phyllis Strong; Mike Sussman
- Production code: 266
- Original air date: April 18, 2001

Guest appearances
- Dwight Schultz as Reginald Barclay; Richard Herd as Admiral Owen Paris; Barry Gordon as Arden Broht; Joseph Campanella as Arbitrator; Lorinne Vozoff as Irene Hansen; Juan Garcia as John Torres; Robert Ito as John Kim; Irene Tsu as Mary Kim

Episode chronology
← Previous "Q2"	Next → "Friendship One"
- Star Trek: Voyager season 7

"Author, Author" is the 166th episode of the TV series Star Trek: Voyager, the 20th episode of the seventh season. This episode focuses on the character "The Doctor," who writes a holonovel.

This episode aired on the United Paramount Network (UPN) on April 18, 2001.

== Plot ==
A new method of communications allows Voyager to contact home for 11 minutes each day with live sound and pictures as opposed to the previous sound and data only. Each crew member is given three minutes to use this time on a rotation which is selected by drawing lots. In the holodeck the Doctor edits his holonovel Photons Be Free and, pleased with his work, he saves the file. He plans to use this new method of communication to publish his work in Federation space.

Tom Paris asks the Doctor to let him preview Photons Be Free, set on the fictional USS Vortex, a Starfleet ship lost in the Delta Quadrant. The protagonist of the story — a holographic doctor — wears a huge cumbersome backpack-like mobile emitter to get around and is constantly mistreated by his crewmates. Worse, each member of the crew is a thinly veiled allusion to an actual crewman but portrayed as being cruel or obnoxious—for example, the Tom Paris character is a self-serving adulterer, Harry Kim is a hypochondriac and Captain Kathryn Janeway is a tyrant and murderer. As a further homage to the Mirror Universe, Tuvok's character wears a goatee. The senior crew plays through the novel one by one. When Janeway sees the fate of the fictional doctor she orders a meeting. The Doctor, while insisting that the story was not based on his crewmates, claims his novel was meant to highlight the plight of Mark I holograms back home. The Doctor, a Mark I hologram, does not like the fact that the other holograms are now reduced to menial tasks.

Going back to the holodeck to work on his novel, the Doctor discovers it has been replaced by a parody where he is a boorish slacker who drugs a patient, reminiscent of Seven of Nine, to take advantage of her. He confronts Tom Paris, who explains that he made it in order to show how hurt the other members of the crew were when they heard the Vortex portrayals of them. This, and a talk with Neelix, convinces him to edit his work so that it is more fictional. He does not wish the entire Federation to see his friends in a negative light. The issue seems to become moot when Admiral Paris from Earth lets Captain Janeway know that Photons Be Free is already being distributed without the Doctor's permission by Ardon Broht, his intended publisher, and people are wondering how fictional it really is.

When Broht refuses to recall the holonovel, an arbitration hearing is conducted by long distance. After several days, the arbiter decides not to rule on whether or not the Doctor is considered a person under current Federation law, and he leaves the debate open for others to decide, stating that they'll have to rule on it eventually because "the issue of holographic rights [wasn't] going away." He does, however, rule that the Doctor is an artist and therefore has the right to control his work and that all copies of his holonovel be recalled immediately.

A few months later in the Alpha Quadrant, on an asteroid where several EMH Mark I's perform menial labor, one of them suggests to another that it should watch Photons Be Free next time at the diagnostic lab.

== Reception ==
Jammer's Reviews rated the episode 4 of 4 stars in 2001. Den of Geek included this in their abbreviated Star Trek: Voyager watching guide, along with several other episodes in season seven. In 2011, Tor.com included this as one of six episodes of Star Trek: Voyager that are worth rewatching.

In 2021, The Digital Fix said this episode imitated "The Measure of a Man", but focused on holographic A.I. rights.

== Home media ==
On December 21, 2003, this episode was released on DVD as part of a Season 7 boxset; Star Trek Voyager: Complete Seventh Season.

== See also ==
- "The Measure of a Man" (Star Trek: The Next Generation)
