= Facepalm =

Gesture and internet term

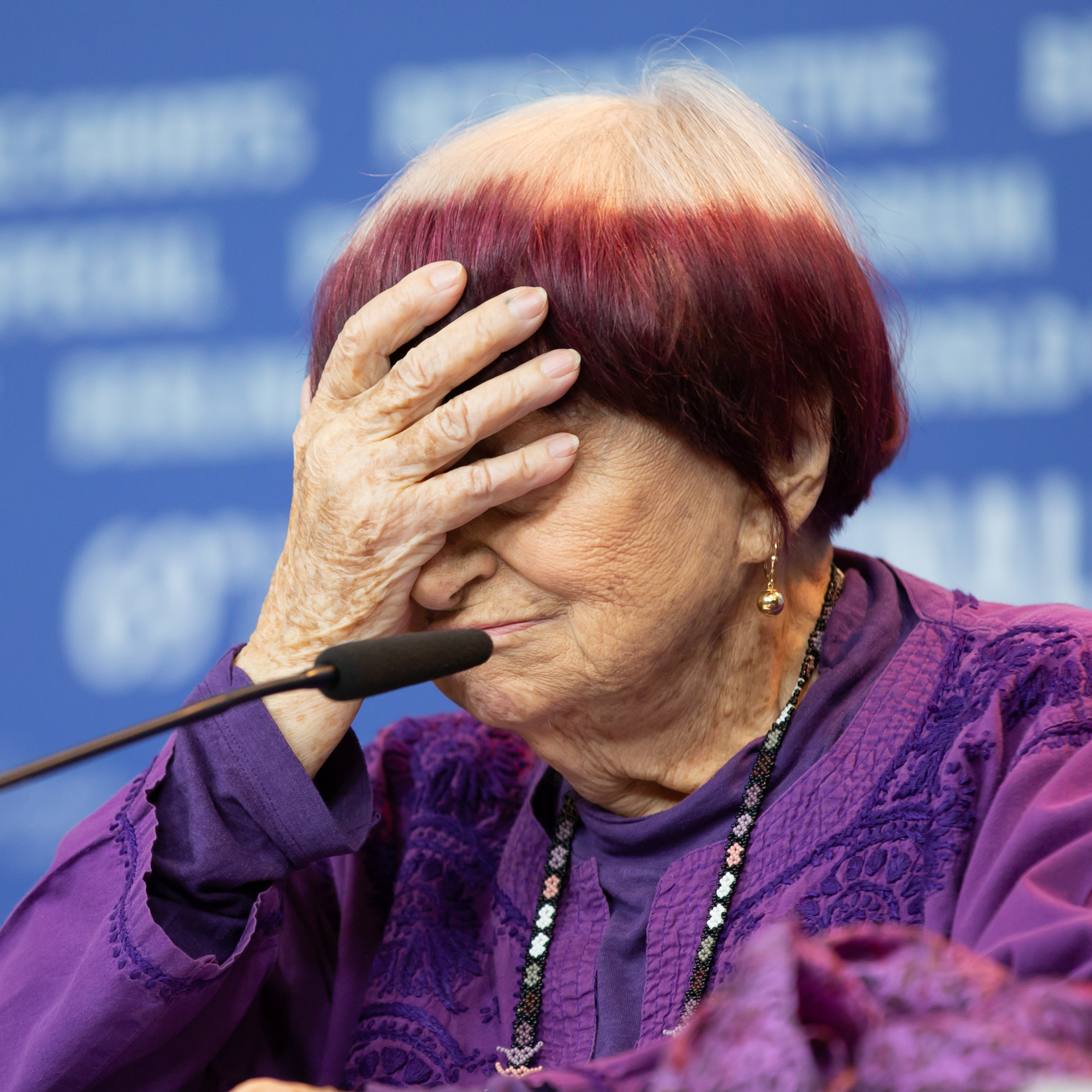
Agnès Varda doing a facepalm

A facepalm is the physical gesture of placing one's hand across one's face, lowering one's face into one's hand or hands or covering or closing one's eyes. The gesture is often exaggerated by giving the motion more force and making a slapping noise when the hand comes in contact with the face. The gesture is found in many cultures as a display of frustration, disappointment, exasperation, embarrassment, horror, shock, surprise, exhaustion, sarcasm, shame, or incredulous disbelief.

== Origins ==
The term facepalm (often used on its own in the same manner as an interjection might be) means that the palm of the hand is brought to the face with fingers splayed as if grasping.

The earliest known evidence of this word is found in records of a Usenet post from May 15, 1996: "Christie facepalmed. 'Well, her hair was red this morning, right? It's blonde now. You figure it out.'" It appears again less than a week later, in another post archived in Google Groups: "Lee facepalmed. 'Arrgh...'"

Images of stockbrokers facepalming have been widely used in the media to convey the dismay associated with poor financial performance, and a wide variety of regrettable film, business, and political decisions have been described as "facepalms" or "facepalm moments". According to Oxford University Press lexicographer Susie Dent, this versatility is one of the reasons that the word has been linguistically "successful". It was added to the Oxford English Dictionary in August 2011.

This gesture is not unique to humans. For example, a group of mandrills at Colchester Zoo adopted a similar gesture to signal their desire to avoid social interaction or be left alone.

== Internet usage ==
Facepalm's meaning online expresses frustration, disappointment, embarrassment, shock, surprise or sarcasm. Its online use is to portray emotions and feelings that otherwise may not be easily expressed through text alone. The facepalm gesture is a popular Internet meme to show a user's frustration or disappointment in an article, comment, or post from another user. It is often also used to indicate incredulous disbelief that another could make a statement that the reader considers unusually foolish or naive.

The gesture can be visually represented by a picture of a person doing the gesture, or it can be shown through a recreation of someone doing the gesture using symbols, such as periods, parentheses, or brackets, to form an outline of a person doing the physical gesture. The symbol representation of facepalm can be made in many different sizes for different purposes, such as a comment or a text message. Another visual use of facepalm is a facepalm emoji or emoticon that can be found on many websites such as Skype. These emojis are used in a similar sense to other internet uses of facepalm.

Video of a Facepalm

Online use of the gesture is not limited to visual representations, often just the word, facepalm, is used to show someone's disapproval or embarrassment. The word is also often surrounded in asterisks or between square brackets — *facepalm* or [facepalm] — to separate the gesture from other words in a post. Since its inception, facepalm has gained widespread popularity as a meme or comment image to portray a user's frustration or disappointment of a certain topic. Many sites such as Reddit use this image frequently and in many different ways, often to comment on the perceived quality of a joke.

In 2016 the facepalm gesture was included in Unicode 9.0 as U+1F926 🤦 FACE PALM emoji.

== Similar gestures ==
A double facepalm.

- Double facepalm: Similar to the facepalm but performed with two hands.
- SMH is an Internet slang term commonly interpreted as "shaking my head" and has an associated emoji.
- Head desk: Expressing great frustration by striking the forehead against something, usually a desk or a wall. Whereas the "head desk" gesture is typically done successive times to emphasize the motion, the facepalm gesture is usually a singular act. On some media sites, the head desk is combined with "facepalm" as the term "face desk", with relatively the same meaning save for the repetition, which is singular and exaggerated.
- Head slapper: A mistake of obvious or shocking stupidity, prompting an expression of astonishment and exasperation performed by striking the forehead with a palm, often producing a loud slapping sound.
- Eye-rolling: A passive-aggressive form of rejection.

== In popular culture ==
- In Nikolai Gogol's 1836 work The Government Inspector, the Governor performs a comparable movement after it becomes clear that the entire city society has been mocked.
- Perhaps the most notorious example comes from the sci-fi series Star Trek: The Next Generation, specifically the 1990 episode "Deja Q". An image of Jean-Luc Picard, played by Patrick Stewart, expressing frustration using this gesture has become a famous internet meme.
- The European localization of the 2014 role-playing game South Park: The Stick of Truth uses a still image of Henri Vidali's facepalming sculpture of Cain against the background of a European Union flag to stand in for each of seven cutscenes that the localization team chose to censor out from the otherwise uncensored original North American release. Each appearance of such image describes the scene being censored in written detail while also ridiculing countries' overly stringent censorship laws. In the Australian localization, a still of a sad koala is used instead.
- In 2019, the Texas SandFest artistic competition awarded Damon Langlois first place for his illusionistic work Liberty Crumbling: "cracking at its foundation... with his hand to his face, [Abraham] Lincoln appears exasperated as he sits on his crumbling platform."

== See also ==
- Cyberculture
- "D'oh!"
- Edgar Kennedy, 20th century American film comedian whose "slow burn" incorporated a facepalm
- List of Internet phenomena
- Viral phenomenon
