= Macrocosm (Star Trek: Voyager) =

- Star Trek: Voyager episode
- Episode no.: Season 3 Episode 12
- Directed by: Alexander Singer
- Written by: Brannon Braga
- Production code: 154
- Original air date: December 11, 1996

Guest appearances
- Michael Fiske - Miner; Albie Selznick - Tak Tak trader

Episode chronology
← Previous "The Q and the Grey"	Next → "Fair Trade"
- Star Trek: Voyager season 3

"Macrocosm" is the 54th episode of Star Trek: Voyager, the 12th episode of the third season. The title borrows the philosophical term macrocosm, definable as a larger world that mirrors what exists in a miniature world, or microcosm.

This episode focuses on an alien infection spreading aboard the USS Voyager, and on the efforts of Janeway and the Doctor to combat it. The episode has a strong action-adventure element, as Janeway has to fight against the aliens.

This science fiction television episode of the Star Trek franchise, aired on UPN on December 11, 1996. It received a Nielsen rating of 4.9 points, which is a measure of how many TV households probably watched this program.

It is also the last episode of Star Trek: Voyager to air before the introduction of the new film style Starfleet uniform from Star Trek: First Contact in the Star Trek: Deep Space Nine episode, "Rapture".

== Plot ==
Captain Janeway and Neelix return to Voyager after completing a trade mission with the Tak Tak race, but find the ship adrift with no signs of life but no apparent damage. Aboard, they investigate the empty ship when Neelix is sprayed with a mucilaginous liquid by an unseen creature, leaving him faint and weak. When Janeway goes to locate medical supplies, Neelix is abducted by an unknown life form. She makes her way to the bridge to send out a distress signal and assess the situation, but is bitten by a flying insect-like creature while there. She locates the crew lying unconscious in the mess hall, with strange growths on their necks that allow more of the insect creatures to emerge. She is attacked by a human-size version of the insects, but is able to make her way to sickbay.

There, Janeway finds the Doctor waiting. The Doctor explains while she and Neelix were away, they responded to a distress call on a nearby Garan mining colony that reported a severe viral infection. The Doctor, being a hologram, had transported down alone believing the virus would not affect him. After discovering the virus was a macro-virus, able to reproduce at large scale, the Doctor provided necessary medical treatment and beamed back, unaware some of the macrovirus were also brought aboard. The virus infected the ship's bio-neural gel packs, and then soon the rest of the crew, using them to reproduce. The Doctor states the macrovirus senses any bio-electric field, forcing him to stay in sick bay to avoid being attacked. The Doctor treats Janeway and provides her with an antiviral gas to be distributed around the ship's environmental systems. The two escape into the Jefferies tubes when the virus start attacking the sickbay doors.

They split up to give Janeway more opportunity to reach the controls, and the Doctor is soon overwhelmed by the macrovirus. As Janeway races for the controls, Voyager is attacked by the Tak Tak, who are responding to the distress call, but believe the ship to be contaminated and are ready to destroy it. Janeway reaches a holodeck and creates a simulation with numerous simulated persons - bio-electric signatures that draw the macrovirus to the holodeck. Once they are all inside, she traps them and releases the antiviral, killing the virus. She is able to warn off the Tak Tak in time. The Doctor is able to restore the rest of the crew and shares the antiviral formula with the Tak Tak before they continue on their way.

== Reception ==
In 2018, TheGamer ranked this one of the top 25 creepiest episodes of all Star Trek series. They noted this episode for depicting extremely large viruses, although they thought it was disgusting and creepy, especially when infected human bodyparts burst with swarms of fly-like viruses.

In 2019, Screen Rant declared "Macrocosm" as having one of the top five best captain moments for Janeway. They call it a "harrowing" episode, noting how Janeway must battle to take her ship back against the alien presence. They note this episode features a sort of insect-like virus that spreads in the spaceship.

In 2020, Gizmodo depicted "Macrocosm" as a way for Star Trek to "do Alien on a UPN budget" and compared this episode's Janeway to Ellen Ripley.

== Home media release ==
This episode was released on DVD on July 6, 2004 as part of Star Trek Voyager: Complete Third Season, with Dolby 5.1 surround audio. The season 3 DVD was released in the UK on September 6, 2004.

In 2017, the complete Star Trek: Voyager television series was released in a DVD box set, which included it as part of the season 3 discs.
