= Human Error (Star Trek: Voyager) =

- Star Trek: Voyager episode
- Episode no.: Season 7 Episode 18
- Directed by: Allan Kroeker
- Story by: André Bormanis; Kenneth Biller
- Teleplay by: Brannon Braga; André Bormanis
- Production code: 264
- Original air date: March 7, 2001

Guest appearance
- Manu Intiraymi - Icheb

Episode chronology
← Previous "Workforce, Part II"	Next → "Q2"
- Star Trek: Voyager season 7

"Human Error" is the 164th episode of the TV series Star Trek: Voyager, the 18th episode of the seventh season. Seven of Nine explores her romantic side, in her ongoing recovery aboard the USS Voyager. Set in the Star Trek universe, a Federation starship must spend decades making its way back to Earth.

This episode aired on the United Paramount Network (UPN) on March 7, 2001.

During the episode, Seven of Nine seeks to explore her humanity more on an emotional level. She is also shown spending time sleeping outside of her regeneration alcove, showing that on a physical level her humanity is reasserting itself more, making Seven less reliant on Borg technology than she has been in the past.

== Plot ==
Seven has been using Voyager's holodeck to try to experience what it would be like to be more human; she enjoys a simulation of the upcoming baby shower for Paris and Torres, and starts to develop a relationship with a computer-generated Chakotay. Outside of the holodeck, though she has been invited to the baby shower, Seven declines. Tuvok assures her that despite their mutual discomfort at such social situations, they are good for morale and encourages her to attend. Seven still decides not to go, and later discusses her feelings while seeing the Doctor about malfunctions in one of her Borg implants. The Doctor finds he cannot extract the implant, which reminds Seven that she is not fully human.

Sometime later, Voyager is knocked out of warp by a nearby explosion. Though the ship is unharmed, they investigate the source of the explosion and find it was from a warhead launched some distance away to a nearby beacon. Fearing that another warhead may actually harm the ship, Captain Janeway orders Seven to find a method to detect the warheads to give them time to evade them. Seven works with Icheb in the Astrometrics lab. She also continues to use the holodeck, the relationship with the virtual Chakotay becoming more romantic.

Seven begins to have difficulty separating the events on the holodeck from that on the real ship; she interrupts Torres during a situation in Engineering to present her with a baby shower gift, mimics some of the behavior she had towards the holodeck Chakotay with the real version, and becomes short-tempered at Icheb. As a result, she fails to complete her assignment, and Voyager is rocked by an explosion from another warhead, closer than the last. Janeway speaks to Seven, seeing that she is distracted, and has Chakotay keep watch on her. Seven goes to the holodeck to break up with the virtual Chakotay, but she suddenly feels pain from her implants, and calls for the Doctor. The Doctor appears in the holodeck, sees the program that she is running, and then has her transported to Sick Bay. After some operations, Seven regains consciousness, and tells the Doctor she plans to delete that program. The Doctor encourages her to continue exploring her humanity, and explains that she just needs to find the balance between her personal life and her duties.

Seven returns to Astrometrics and completes her assignment; they discover a series of warheads approaching Voyager but are able to safely evade them without damage to the ship. Later, the Doctor tells Seven that he believes her Borg implants short-circuited as a failsafe that would be triggered if a drone ever gained back their emotions. He suggests he could remove them after a long series of surgeries, but Seven declines, believing it necessary to keep her focus on her duties. When she later encounters Chakotay, he invites her to a dinner party for the senior crew that even Tuvok is attending, but she declines and walks away.

== Reception ==
=== Negative ===
In 2015, a Star Trek: Voyager binge-watching guide by Wired suggested skipping this episode.

=== Positive ===
In 2017, Screen Rant ranked "Human Error" the tenth best romantic episode of Star Trek, in a story that mixes a holodeck driven fantasy with daily life aboard a starship.

SyFy recommended this episode for their Seven of Nine binge-watching guide.
