= Workforce (Star Trek: Voyager) =

- Star Trek: Voyager episodes
- Episode nos.: Season 7 Episodes 16 & 17
- Directed by: Allan Kroeker (part I); Roxann Dawson (part II)
- Written by: Kenneth Biller (part I); Bryan Fuller (part I)
- Story by: Kenneth Biller (part II); Bryan Fuller (part II)
- Teleplay by: Kenneth Biller (part II); Michael Taylor (part II)
- Production codes: 262 & 263
- Original air dates: February 21, 2001; February 28, 2001

Guest appearances
- James Read - Jaffen; Don Most - Kadan; John Aniston - Quarran Ambassador; Iona Morris - Umali; Tom Virtue - Supervisor; Michael Behrens - Coyote; Robert Joy - Inspector Yerid; Jay Harrington - Dr. Ravoc; David Keith Anderson - Ens. Ashmore; Akemi Royer - Med Tech; Matthew Williamson - Security Officer #2; Robert Mammana - Guard (part II); Damara Reilly - Alien Surgeon (part II); Joseph Will - Security Officer #3 (part II); Majel Barrett - Narrator

Episode chronology
← Previous "The Void"	Next → "Human Error"
- Star Trek: Voyager season 7

"Workforce" is a two-part episode from the seventh and final season of the TV series Star Trek: Voyager. Part one was directed by Allan Kroeker, and part two by Roxann Dawson. The crew of the USS Voyager find themselves working on a planet, with troubling memories resurfacing.

"Workforce Part I" aired on the United Paramount Network (UPN) on February 21, 2001, and "Workforce, Part II" aired February 28, 2001.

== Plot ==
=== Part I ===
On an alien planet, Kathryn Janeway happily shows up for her first day of work at an energy plant, eager to take up her new position. None of the other Voyager crew members are visible, and it appears Voyager has abandoned its attempts to return to the Alpha Quadrant and Earth.

After being shown to her work station, Janeway meets a man named Jaffen, who intervenes when Janeway inadvertently misconfigures her console and sets off an alarm. They soon run afoul of Annika Hansen (Seven of Nine), the plant's stern new Efficiency Monitor. Tuvok, a fellow employee, approaches Janeway in apparent confusion, though neither Janeway, Tuvok, or Seven of Nine recognize one another. Tuvok claims that they do not belong there, which attracts the attention of a doctor and mystifies Janeway and Jaffen.

A doctor diagnoses Tuvok with "dysphoria syndrome" and begins treatment. Tuvok shows signs that he has recalled his time on Voyager and attempts several more times to contact the others.

Tom Paris, who was employed at the plant with Janeway and Tuvok, is fired despite there being a labor shortage. He takes a job at a bar, and befriends B'Elanna Torres, a pregnant woman who also works at the energy plant.

Meanwhile, Chakotay, Neelix, and Harry Kim return to Voyager from a short mission away to find the ship empty other than the Emergency Command Hologram (the Doctor), who is in command and attempting to make repairs on the damaged ship, while contending with a damaged and uncooperative computer system. The ECH explains that the ship was damaged by a floating mine, which was a ruse allowing unknown parties to abduct the crew.

Chakotay has himself surgically altered to resemble the planet's native race, and beams down to the planet, masquerading as "Amal Kotay." After following Torres for several minutes, he assists Neelix in abducting and transporting her to Voyager (where the Doctor reverses the mental conditioning). Chakotay is unable to be beamed back to the ship, but avoids capture.

=== Part II ===
With Neelix's help, Torres begins to remember her life as a starship engineer. On the planet, Chakotay (who has managed to escape capture thus far) approaches Janeway, but is unable to overcome her skepticism.

A young doctor begins to become suspicious of so many people of the same species having the apparently rare "dysphoria syndrome," and almost all of them getting jobs at the energy plant at the same time, and none of them having any previous file references. After gentle inquiries result in an official "hands-off" warning from local law enforcement, the doctor approaches Annika Hansen, who is initially skeptical, but begins taking Tuvok's rants seriously.

What the Efficiency Monitor discovers breaks the spell: the workers at the plant were diagnosed with dysphoria syndrome (and treated with mind-altering drugs), specifically so they could be placed in the plant to alleviate a labor shortage. Examining the files of the plant's newest "employees," she discovers they are all Voyager officers and crew, and begins to launch a deeper investigation.

Meanwhile, Chakotay, Kim and the Doctor discover the planet's own government is unaware of the kidnappings. Working with the plant's doctor and a suspicious investigator, Annika unmasks the conspiracy while Chakotay convinces Janeway and Jaffen to help. The two are able to lower the shields, allowing Voyager to beam the crew out after defeating the ships that had been kidnapping people. With the conspiracy exposed, the planetary government promises to stop the forced labor practice and return everyone who was abducted home after reversing the conditioning that they had undergone. Jaffen reveals that he was actually a willing worker on the planet and chooses to remain rather than leaving with Janeway.

== Reception ==
SyFy Wire ranked this the 8th best episode with a Bryan Fuller writing credit, saying it "does a better job of giving the entire cast strong character beats than almost any other Voyager episode." Den of Geek included this in their abbreviated Star Trek: Voyager watching guide, along with several other season seven episodes. CBR said that in this episode, the cast can play characters that are a little different from their normal characters. The Digital Fix said this one of the "good episodes" from season seven, praising its character development and narrative.

== Home media releases ==
On December 21, 2003, this episode was released on DVD as part of a Season 7 boxset; Star Trek Voyager: Complete Seventh Season.

== Related pages ==
- Stargate SG-1 season 4#ep76 Beneath the Surface episode with similar plot
