= Q (Star Trek) =

Fictional character from Star Trek, played by John de Lancie

- First appearance: "Encounter at Farpoint" (1987) (The Next Generation)
- Last appearance: "Wedding Bell Blues" (2025) (Star Trek: Strange New Worlds)
- Created by: Gene Roddenberry; D. C. Fontana
- Portrayed by: John de Lancie

In-universe information
- Species: Q
- Spouse: Lady Q
- Children: Little Q (q); Trelane

Q is a fictional character, as well as the name of a race, in the Star Trek franchise. They appear in the series Next Generation, Deep Space Nine, Voyager, Lower Decks, Picard, and Strange New Worlds as well as in related media. The most familiar Q is portrayed by John de Lancie. He is an extra-dimensional being of unknown origin who possesses immeasurable power over time, space, the laws of physics, and reality itself, being capable of altering it to his whim. Despite his vast knowledge and experience spanning untold eons, he is not above practical jokes for his personal amusement, a Machiavellian or manipulative purpose, or to prove a point. He is said to be almost completely omnipotent and continually evasive regarding his true motivations.

The name "Q" applies to the names of the individuals portrayed (all male and female characters refer to each other as "Q"); it also applies to the name of their race and to the "Q Continuum" itself – an alternate dimension accessible to only the Q and their "invited" guests. The true nature of the realm is said to be beyond the comprehension of "lesser beings" such as humans, therefore it is shown to humans only in ways they can understand; e.g., a run-down gas station in the "middle of nowhere".

Beginning with the pilot episode of The Next Generation, "Encounter at Farpoint", Q became a recurring character, with pronounced comedic and dramatic chemistry with Jean-Luc Picard. He serves as a major antagonist throughout The Next Generation, playing a pivotal role in both the first and final episodes. Q is initially presented as a cosmic force judging humanity to see if it is becoming a threat to the universe, but as the series progresses, his role morphs more into one of a teacher to Picard and the human race generally – albeit often in seemingly destructive or disruptive ways, subject to his own amusement. Other times, notably during "Deja Q" and Voyager, Q appears to the crew seeking assistance.

Gene Roddenberry chose the letter "Q" in honor of his friend Janet Quarton.

== Appearances in Star Trek media ==
=== List of appearances ===
Many Star Trek television episodes and novels have featured Q and often have titles that play on the letter "Q".

- Star Trek: The Next Generation:
  - "Encounter at Farpoint"
  - "Hide and Q"
  - "Q Who"
  - "Deja Q"
  - "Qpid"
  - "True Q"
  - "Tapestry"
  - "All Good Things..."
- Star Trek: Deep Space Nine:
  - "Q-Less"
- Star Trek: Voyager:
  - "Death Wish"
  - "The Q and the Grey"
  - "Q2"
- Star Trek: Lower Decks:
  - "Veritas"
- Star Trek: Picard:
  - "The Star Gazer"
  - "Penance"
  - "Assimilation"
  - "Watcher"
  - "Fly Me to the Moon"
  - "Two of One"
  - "Mercy"
  - "Farewell"
  - "The Last Generation"
- Star Trek: Strange New Worlds:
  - "Wedding Bell Blues"
- Novels, (audiobook versions read by John de Lancie):
  - Q-in-Law^{1}
  - Q-Squared^{1}
  - I, Q (written by de Lancie)^{1}
  - The Q Continuum (includes Q-Zone, Q-Space, Q-Strike)
  - String Theory
  - Star Trek: Borg
  - Planet X
  - The Eternal Tide
  - Q & A
- Audio Presentations (starring John de Lancie and Leonard Nimoy):
  - "Spock vs. Q"
  - "Spock vs. Q: The Sequel"
- Video games:
  - Star Trek: Borg
  - Star Trek: The Game Show (features Q as "host" of a trivia contest)
  - Star Trek: Online
  - Star Trek Timelines

^{1}Note: Audiobook version available.

=== Television ===
Q debuted in "Encounter at Farpoint", where he puts Captain Picard and the Enterprise crew on trial, arguing that humanity is a dangerous race and should be destroyed. When they later save the life of a kidnapped alien, Q agrees to defer judgment, though he hints that it will not be the last time the crew sees him.

In "Hide and Q", he forces the Enterprise crew to participate in a war game against monsters he summoned, then makes a wager with Picard. He grants Commander William Riker the powers of a Q, then promises that if Riker rejects the powers, then Q will leave them alone. Riker uses the powers to save his friends and starts to lose himself to them, but ultimately manages to reject them. Q attempts to go back on his word, but the Q Continuum forcibly recalls him.

In "Q Who", he offers to divest himself of his powers and guide humanity through uncharted regions and prepare it for unknown threats. Picard argues that Q's services are unneeded (and unwanted), and Q rebuts him by teleporting the USS Enterprise to a distant system for their first encounter with the Borg. Unable to resist the Borg, Picard must ask Q to save the ship. Q returns the Enterprise home and tells Picard that other men would rather have died than ask for help. This episode also reveals Q has a past history and hostile relationship with Guinan.

In "Deja Q", Q is punished by the Q Continuum by being made mortal; his committing of an uncharacteristically selfless act (sacrificing his life so that a race attacking him will not destroy the Enterprise) garners the return of his powers. In the same episode, Q says that Picard is "the closest thing in this universe that I have to a friend."

The Q are mentioned in "Devil's Due". A woman named Ardra claims to be the Devil to subjugate a planet, displaying abilities similar to the Q. The crew speculate that she may be a member of the Q Continuum or even Q himself in a disguise before Picard points out Q would not be interested in a planet's economics. Ardra is exposed as a con artist using technology to simulate her powers.

In "Qpid", Q attempts to repay Picard for saving him in "Deja Q" by helping him with his relationship with his ex-girlfriend Vash. He transports everyone to Sherwood Forest and casts himself as the Sheriff of Nottingham, Picard as Robin Hood, the crew as the Merry Men, and Vash as Maid Marian, then challenges them to rescue her. Q and Vash find themselves kindred spirits, and she ultimately decides to go with him and explore the universe together.

In "True Q", Q reveals that a new crew member named Amanda Rogers is actually the daughter of two rogue members of the Q Continuum, then orders her to choose between remaining human and never using her powers, or coming with him to join the Continuum. After using her powers to save a planet, Amanda decides to join the Continuum.

Toward the end of The Next Generation, Q is less antagonistic toward Picard. In "Tapestry", Q apparently saves Picard and helps him better understand himself, giving Picard a chance to avoid the accident that gave him an artificial heart only for Picard to choose dying as himself over living the tedious life he would have lived without the inspiration of his near-death experience (although whether Q actually appeared in this episode or was merely a hallucination Picard experienced during surgery is deliberately left ambiguous).

In "All Good Things", Q reveals that the trial of humanity is not over and displaces Picard through different time periods where a temporal anomaly threatens the existence of humanity. After Picard resolves the situation, Q admits to having helped him find the solution and to having saved him from death. Q departs, stating that the trial of humanity is never over.

In the Star Trek: Deep Space Nine episode "Q-Less", Vash decided to end her partnership with Q. Q follows her to the Deep Space Nine station and attempts to win her back. Q is blamed for a series of power failures, but denies it. Q taunts Commander Benjamin Sisko, only to get punched in the face, shocking him since 'Picard never did that'. The power failures were actually caused by an alien life form disguised as a crystal that Vash was carrying. Q gives Vash his blessing to leave him.

In the Star Trek: Voyager episode "Death Wish", Q pursues a rogue member of the Continuum, later named Quinn, who has been inadvertently released from his asteroid prison by the crew of that ship, and who seeks asylum on Voyager. He demands that Q make him human, as he does not wish to be a member of the Continuum any more, but Q refuses, because Quinn intends to commit suicide if he becomes human. The two parties agree to allow Captain Janeway to mediate their dispute, and after Janeway eventually finds in favor of Quinn, he is made human and then commits suicide. It is subsequently revealed that Q chose to assist Quinn's suicide.

Later, in the Voyager episode "The Q and the Grey", Q reappears on the Voyager, asking Janeway to bear his child. He eventually reveals that the uncertainty and instability caused by Quinn's suicide divided the Continuum, causing a civil war between Quinn's followers (of which Q is a part) and the rest of the Continuum. Q believes that the birth of a new member of the Continuum could revitalize the Q by giving them something new to focus on after millennia of stagnation and boredom. Janeway refuses, and after she and her crew bring about a ceasefire in the Continuum, Q eventually mates with a female Q (Suzie Plakson) with whom he had been involved (referred to in Star Trek novels as 'Lady Q'), producing a son. Their progeny is born conscious and with all the power of any other Q, although lacking adult maturity. Q makes Janeway his godmother.

In the episode "Q2", he appears on Voyager with his immature, rebellious son, who appears as a human teenager (played by John de Lancie's real-life son Keegan de Lancie, and referred to in the novels as "Little Q" or "q"). Q asks Janeway to mentor his son, and the two adults agree that the boy will remain on Voyager, without his powers, and either learn how to be a responsible, accountable, and productive inhabitant of the cosmos, or spend eternity as an amoeba. Eventually, the young Q comes around, but the Continuum is not entirely convinced, so in negotiation with Q, they come to an agreement. Q must eternally guard, observe, and accompany the boy to ensure his proper behavior. Q thanks Janeway for her help by showing her a shortcut to Earth that will shave three years off Voyager's journey. When she asks why he does not just send them directly to Earth, he says it would set a bad example for his son to do all the work for them.

In the Star Trek: Lower Decks episode "Veritas", Q appears in a flashback, challenging the senior crew of the USS Cerritos to an inexplicable 'game' to prove humanity's worth, dressing them up as chess pieces facing a football field filled with anthropomorphic cards and soccer balls. Later in the episode, he appears again to challenge the ensigns to a duel, but he is unceremoniously blown off by Ensign Mariner, who tells him to "go bother Picard." Q follows them anyway, complaining that Picard is always quoting Shakespeare and making wine.

Q returns in season 2 of Star Trek: Picard. In the episode "The Star Gazer", the Stargazer encounters a Borg vessel containing the Borg Queen. When it appears that she is assimilating the Stargazer and controlling the fleet, Picard activates the ship's self-destruct mechanism to stop her. Just as the ship explodes, Picard abruptly wakes up in a different version of his home. Q appears, initially looking like his younger self before turning himself into an old man to match Picard's age. Q says the trial of humanity is not over, so he has altered history to show Picard "the end of the road not taken."

In the next episode, "Penance", Q acts unusually agitated while claiming this dark, totalitarian future is all Picard's fault, even striking Picard when he complains. This prompts Picard to wonder if Q is unwell. Q admits to saving Picard and his crew from the explosion of the Stargazer and making sure they all remembered the original timeline to give them a chance to change it back. After Q departs, Picard meets his crew and they work with a captured Borg Queen, who can detect temporal anomalies and says this future was caused by a change in Los Angeles in the year 2024.

In the next episode, "Assimilation", Q briefly appears to taunt Picard about how everything was lost because of his fears before disappearing.

In the next episode, "Watcher", Q appears in Los Angeles in 2024 (before First Contact), observing a woman working on a planned spaceflight to Europa. He is then surprised to find his powers do not work.

In the next episode, "Fly Me to the Moon", the woman is revealed to be Jean-Luc Picard's ancestor, Renee Picard. Undaunted by the loss of his powers, Q poses as Renee's psychiatrist and tries to convince her to cancel her spaceflight to Europa. When Picard and his crew find out about this, they speculate that this is the change that causes the dark future. Q also meets Dr. Adam Soong and provides him a temporary cure for his daughter Kore's life-threatening illness. Desperate for a permanent cure, Soong agrees to assist Q.

In the next episode, "Two of One", Q instructs Soong to stop Renee from going on her spaceflight, which he attempts by trying to hit her with his car. However, Picard pushes her out of the way and is hit instead and hospitalized by his injuries.

Q is mentioned in the next episode, "Monsters". After recovering, Picard asks Guinan to summon Q to their location so he can question him, remembering Q's unusual behavior in their previous encounter. Guinan reveals that the Q Continuum and her race, the El-Aurians, went to war in the past before making a peace treaty. However, her rite to summon Q fails.

In the next episode, "Mercy", after Picard and Guinan have been arrested by an FBI agent, Q visits Guinan disguised as an agent, revealing that he is dying and that this whole scenario was just an attempt to give his life meaning. He leaves after saying humans are always stuck in the past, giving Picard inspiration to pry into the agent's past to persuade him to let them go. Q later visits Kore and gives her the permanent cure even though Soong did not fulfill his end of the bargain, allowing her to leave her home and escape her controlling father. The Borg Queen reveals the change that caused the dark future: In the original timeline, Renee found an alien life form on Europa, paving the way for the formation of the Federation. If Renee's flight is prevented, Dr. Adam Soong will eventually rise in power and become ruler of the world.

In "Farewell," after the original timeline is restored, Picard leaves the skeleton key behind a loose brick in the wall for his younger self to find, then encounters Q in his home. Q notes that Picard had the chance to potentially save his mother and change his own future, but instead he chose to accept himself as he is and absolve himself of his guilt. Because Picard has chosen himself, perhaps now he will finally believe himself worthy of being chosen by someone else, and may even give himself the chance to be loved. Q repeats his earlier statement that this was about forgiveness: Picard's own forgiveness of himself. Q reminds Picard that all of the deaths caused by Q's alteration of the timeline have been fixed, apart from Tallinn and Elnor. However, Tallinn was always destined to die in every timeline, but thanks to Picard's intervention, Tallinn had been able to meet Renée in this one. Picard asks why Q had taken such an interest in him for over thirty years, and Q explains that he is dying alone and does not want that for Picard. As such, he had set it up so Picard could travel back in time and become unshackled from his past ("As I leave, I leave you free.") For once, Q had not been acting for some grander design, but simply because he cared about Picard and genuinely wanted to help his friend.

Gathering outside, Q prepares to use the last of his power to send Picard and his friends back to their own timeline, an action that will kill Q in his weakened state. When Rios chooses to stay in 2024, Q tells Picard that he now has an unexpected surplus of energy, which he will use to give Picard a final surprise gift. Stating that Q does not have to die alone, Picard hugs him, and an emotional Q promises to "See you out there." He then snaps his fingers one last time, sending Picard, Raffi, and Seven back to 2401 moments before the Stargazer's destruction, allowing Picard the chance to change his future. Shortly thereafter, the group discovers Q's final gift: Q has resurrected Elnor and returned him to the Excelsior.

Despite his supposed death, Q appears to Picard's son Jack Crusher in a mid-credits scene of the Star Trek: Picard series finale "The Last Generation". When asked about his supposed death, Q simply states that he had hoped that the next generation would not think so linearly and that while humanity's trial has ended for Picard, it has only just begun for Jack.

The Q were also mentioned in the fourth season of Star Trek: Discovery as the possible creators of the Dark Matter Anomaly threatening the Alpha Quadrant, but were dismissed as being such by the Federation due to neither Q or his fellow Q being heard from since the late 26th century.

In the Star Trek: Strange New Worlds episode "Wedding Bell Blues", Q appears in spectral form to reprimand his son, Trelane, for interfering with the crew of the Enterprise using false memories.

=== Novels ===
The similarity between Q and Trelane, the alien encountered in the Star Trek episode "The Squire of Gothos", inspired writer Peter David to establish in his 1994 novel Q-Squared that Trelane is a member of the Continuum, and that Q is his godfather; it is heavily implied that Q is actually Trelane's biological father, although the truth of this was kept a secret. This parental connection would later be made official in Strange New Worlds.

Q's past is expanded on in the trilogy The Q Continuum, which has Q and Picard travel through Q's past, witnessing Q's first encounter with the being that inspired his interest in testing other races. This being, known as 0, is similar to Q in power and abilities (although an injury of some sort prevents 0 travelling faster than light under his own power, even if he can still teleport short distances), but whereas Q has been shown to be more of a "merry prankster" throughout Star Trek canon, 0 is malevolent in his desires. Where Q always offers his opponents a sporting chance to win his challenges, 0 is ultimately shown to use his 'tests' as just an excuse to torture other races, to the extent that he basically changes the rules of his games so that the subjects will inevitably lose. The young Q ends up bringing him into the Milky Way galaxy through the Guardian of Forever while looking for something new to do with himself, and 0 assembles other seemingly omnipotent beings from the original Star Trek, including Gorgan (the entity who turned children against their parents in "And the Children Shall Lead"), The One (the being who impersonated God in Star Trek V: The Final Frontier) and (*) (the entity from "Day of the Dove", which thrived on violent conflict). However, although intrigued at 0's words about testing lesser races, Q loses his taste for 0's methods when 0's group provoke the Tkon Empire- an advanced civilisation millennia in the past- into decades of civil war and then blows up their sun just as they were about to exchange their dying old sun for a younger, fresher one, the Tkon having completed their Great Endeavour despite the war. 0's group was later defeated in a battle with the Q Continuum, though the dinosaurs were left extinct as a result when Q diverted an asteroid from one of the combatants so that it would strike Earth instead. With Q having abstained from most of the conflict, he was thus put in charge of watching over Earth and its inhabitants as a possible rehabilitation project, while (*) and Gorgan escaped and The One was trapped at the heart of the galaxy having been reduced to just his head. 0 in particular was banished to just outside our galaxy and the galactic barrier erected to keep him out; as Picard observes, with 0's crippled state preventing him travelling faster than light, 0 was essentially reduced to a shipwrecked survivor cut off from the nearest inhabitable land and millennia away from anywhere else. In the course of the trilogy, 0 is temporarily released from his banishment beyond the galaxy and sought revenge on Q, having manipulated a dying scientist to complete an artificial wormhole experiment intended to let starships breach the barrier that would allow 0 to regain access. However, 0 was defeated when Picard was able to convince one of 0's old enemies to join forces with Q so that their combined powers could stop his former mentor.

The novel The Buried Age — which explores Picard's life between the destruction of the Stargazer and his appointment to the position of captain of the Enterprise-D — ends with a cameo appearance by Q as he meets an alien woman who recently met Picard before she chose to ascend to a higher plane of existence, her tales of Picard inspiring Q's own interest in humanity. This novel also establishes why Q chose his name, as he wanted something that would be simple for humans to remember, reasoning that, if he was ever asked why he was called 'Q', he could reply "Because U will always be behind me".

In the Voyager novel The Eternal Tide, Q's son sacrifices himself to save the universe, inspired by the example of the resurrected Kathryn Janeway, prompting Q to declare himself her enemy. However, he swiftly gets over this hostility 'off-screen', and by the later novel A Pocket Full of Lies, it is revealed that he acted to save the life of an alternate Janeway created during the events of "Shattered".

In the Star Trek comic series based on the alternate timeline established in the 2009 film Star Trek, Q visits that reality to take the crew of the Enterprise into their future. This allows them to interact with characters from the original timeline in the new history created by Spock's trip to the past. It also helps Q deal with a threat to the Continuum in the form of the Pah-Wraiths, which have all but destroyed the Bajoran Prophets in this timeline, the Enterprise crew retrieving a tablet containing the last Prophet and allowing it to merge with Q to defeat the Pah-Wraiths.

=== Computer games ===
The 1996 computer game Star Trek: Borg was primarily made up of live action segments directed by James L. Conway and featured John de Lancie as Q.

Another Q also appears during holiday events in the massively multiplayer online game Star Trek Online including the creation of a Christmas village that player characters can be teleported to. This entity is believed to be The Junior Q as he had mentioned the name "Aunt Kathy".

=== Q's phone number ===
In Star Trek: Picard, S02E05 "Fly Me to the Moon", Q sends Dr. Adam Soong his business card via his 3D printer. The number on it was (323) 634–5667. This is a functional phone number intended for the viewers to call, and responds with a short message from John de Lancie's portrayal of Q. Since initial launch this phone number is still active.

== Reception ==
In 2009, Q was ranked as the 9th best character of all Star Trek by IGN.

In 2016, Time rated Q as the #10 best villain of the Star Trek franchise.

In 2017, Space.com rated Q as one of the "15 of the Most Bizarre Alien Species" of the Star Trek franchise.

In 2018, The Wrap said that Q would be at the top of the list if he was included with ranking 39 main cast characters of the Star Trek franchise prior to Star Trek: Discovery.

In 2018, CBR ranked Q the #1 best Star Trek recurring character.
