= The Q and the Grey =

- Star Trek: Voyager episode
- Episode no.: Season 3 Episode 11
- Directed by: Cliff Bole
- Story by: Shawn Piller
- Teleplay by: Kenneth Biller
- Production code: 153
- Original air date: November 27, 1996

Guest appearances
- John de Lancie - Q; Suzie Plakson - Miss Q; Harve Presnell - Colonel Q

Episode chronology
| ← Previous "Warlord" | Next → "Macrocosm" |
- Star Trek: Voyager season 3

"The Q and the Grey" is the 11th episode of the third season of Star Trek: Voyager, the 53rd episode overall.

== Plot ==
Captain Kathryn Janeway is surprised when Q appears in her quarters – and in her bed – one night. Q is intent on Janeway becoming the mother of his child, and plies the Captain with gifts in an attempt to win her affections. Q believes that his desire for Janeway should be regarded as an honour, but Janeway insists that he leave, and eventually he does.

Q's absence does not last long, as he abducts the captain and takes her to the Q Continuum, now appearing as an American Civil War period piece. He explains that there is a civil war brewing among the Q race, and Q hopes that he and Janeway can bring a child into the Continuum to avert the war. The Q authorities (represented as Confederate soldiers) fire on them, wounding Q, then arrive and capture Q and Janeway. The Q leader, appearing as a Confederate colonel, intends to execute them both.

On Voyager, the remaining crew have been observing dozens of supernovae taking place throughout the area. A Q female (Suzie Plakson), Q's former partner, appears and says that the civil war among the Q is the cause. She helps the crew reach the Q Continuum by flying into a supernova, and provides the Voyager crew with Q weapons, which they use to attack the Q authorities' camp and free Q and Janeway. The two Qs resume their relationship and decide to become parents themselves, thus ending the war. Captain Janeway is witness to the two Q mating, which consists of simply touching fingers.

Q returns later to Janeway's quarters with his infant son and asks her to be his godmother, which she accepts.

== Background ==
The trigger for the civil war among the Q was the suicide of the Q known as "Quinn", the focus of the Voyager episode "Death Wish". The underlying cause for the civil war, though, was longstanding tension between two Q factions which maintain a tenuous balance between simple survival and creative advancement as a species.

== Releases ==
The episode first aired in the United States on November 27, 1996, and subsequently in Germany and Hungary in 1998 and 2001, respectively. In the USA it was aired on the television network UPN.

This was released as a single episode on VHS video cassette tape in July 2002. This episode was also released in 2006, on DVD as part of the Q Collective, which features episodes from across the Star Trek franchise featuring this character.

"The Q and the Grey" was released on LaserDisc in Japan on June 25, 1999, as part of the 3rd season vol.1 set.

This episode was released on DVD on July 6, 2004 as part of Star Trek Voyager: Complete Third Season, with Dolby 5.1 surround audio. The season 3 DVD was released in the UK on September 6, 2004.

In 2017, the complete Star Trek: Voyager television series was released in a DVD box set, which included it as part of the season 3 discs.
