= Deja Q =

- Star Trek: The Next Generation episode
- Episode no.: Season 3 Episode 13
- Directed by: Les Landau
- Written by: Richard Danus
- Cinematography by: Marvin Rush
- Production code: 161
- Original air date: February 5, 1990

Guest appearances
- John de Lancie as Q; Corbin Bernsen as another Q (Uncredited); Whoopi Goldberg as Guinan; Richard Cansino as Garin; Betty Muramoto as Bre'el IV scientist; Majel Barrett as Computer Voice

Episode chronology
← Previous "The High Ground"	Next → "A Matter of Perspective"
- Star Trek: The Next Generation season 3

"Deja Q" is the 13th episode of the third season of the American science fiction television series Star Trek: The Next Generation, and the 61st episode of the series overall. This episode aired on syndicated television in February 1990.

In this episode, as the 24th-century crew of the starship Enterprise D struggles to prevent a moon from falling out of orbit, their situation is further complicated by a visit from a powerful nemesis named "Q" (John de Lancie), who informs them that he has been stripped of all his powers and must live out a mortal life.

The episode is noted for its comedy and exploration of humanity and morality.

== Plot ==
The Federation starship Enterprise arrives at the planet Bre'el IV, whose moon is descending from its orbit and threatening to crash into the highly populated world below. As the crew scrambles to find a solution, Q suddenly appears on the bridge naked. He explains that he has come to the Enterprise seeking asylum, as he has been stripped of his powers and banished from his home dimension, the Q Continuum, as punishment for his chaotic antics. Captain Picard is skeptical of Q's story but reluctantly offers him shelter, albeit in the brig.

Picard urges Q to use his powers to return the moon to its proper orbit. Q insists he is powerless but offers his vast intellect and experience to assist the crew. Picard agrees and assigns Lt. Commander Data to monitor him. In engineering, Q flippantly suggests altering the gravitational constant of the universe, inspiring Chief Engineer La Forge to attempt a similar effect by wrapping the moon in a low-level warp field, allowing the ship to drag it back into place.

Meanwhile, Q struggles to adapt to his newfound humanity, experiencing fatigue, hunger, and other human conditions. Data tells Q that, as an android, he aspires to have the human experiences Q now resents. Shortly after, Q is attacked by the Calamarain, a gaseous alien species he once tormented. Picard deduces that Q sought refuge on the Enterprise to protect himself from the countless creatures he has mistreated. When the shields are lowered for a test of La Forge's procedure, the Calamarain attack again, and Data is nearly electrocuted defending Q from their assault. Realizing that his presence is causing more harm than good, Q steals a shuttlecraft and leaves the ship, intending to sacrifice himself to draw the Calamarain away.

As the Calamarain close in on the shuttle, a second Q being appears and informs Q that due to his selfless act, the Continuum is willing to restore his powers. Q accepts and subdues the Calamarain, but releases them after being reminded to reflect on the lessons he has learned. He then returns to the Enterprise to bestow a parting gift on Data: a few moments of laughter.

On learning that the Bre'el moon has been safely returned to orbit, Picard surmises that Q was responsible and muses that the omnipotent being may have a residue of humanity after all. However, Q's voice reminds him, "Don't bet on it."

== Reception ==
In 2012, this episode was listed by Forbes as an alternative top ten Star Trek: The Next Generation episode selection, which said it was an excellent episode about Q with a good performance from actor John De Lancie.

Gizmodo ranked "Déjà Q" as the 87th out of 100 of the best of all over 700 Star Trek television episodes as of 2014. In 2019, Mike Bloom writing for The Hollywood Reporter listed "Deja Q" among the twenty five best episodes of the series. Bloom said this is one of the best episodes with Q, and his relationship with Data was "delightful". He also said this episode is the origin of the Picard facepalm, an internet meme, as did CNET.

In 2019 Screen Rant ranked "Déjà Q" one of the top ten episodes of Star Trek: The Next Generation, describing it as funny, noting how Q must "reconcile with his newfound mortality", and that it wraps up with a heart-warming ending. That same year, they ranked "Deja Q" the ninth-funniest episode.

In 2020 CBR said this was the 4th best episode with Q, and noted an IMDb rating of 8.6/10 at that time. It says the episode explored what it means to be human and have mercy.

== Releases ==
The episode was released with Star Trek: The Next Generation season three DVD box set, released in the United States on July 2, 2002. This had 26 episodes of Season 3 on seven discs, with a Dolby Digital 5.1 audio track. It was released in high-definition Blu-ray in the United States on April 30, 2013.

This episode was released in the "Q Continuum" collection of LaserDisc. The collection was released on July 30, 1997 and was published by Paramount Home Video; it retailed for 100 USD. The set included the 2-part "Encounter at Farpoint", "Hide & Q", "Q Who?", and "Deja Q" on 12 inch optical discs in NTSC format with a total runtime of 230 minutes. The collection came in a Tri-Fold jacket that also included a letter from actor Jon De Lancie.

The episode was released in Japan on LaserDisc on July 5, 1996, in the half season set Log. 5: Third Season Part.1 by CIC Video. This included episodes up to "A Matter of Perspective" on 12-inch double sided optical discs. The video was in NTSC format with both English and Japanese audio tracks.
