= John de Lancie =

American actor (born 1948)

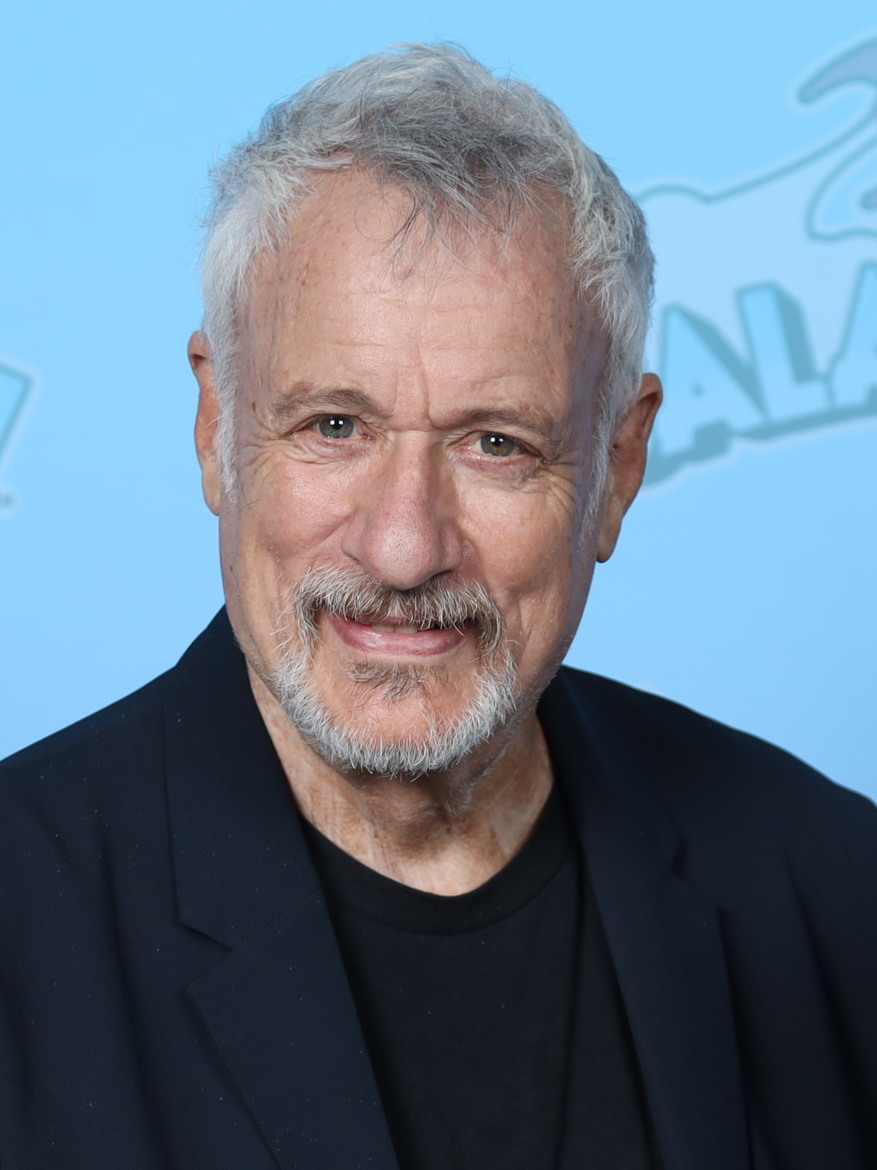
- De Lancie at the 2023 GalaxyCon Raleigh
- Born: John Sherwood de Lancie, Jr. March 20, 1948 (age 78); Philadelphia, Pennsylvania, U.S.
- Education: Kent State University (attended); Juilliard School (BFA)
- Occupation: Actor
- Years active: 1976–present
- Spouse: Marnie Mosiman (m. 1984)
- Children: 2, including Keegan
- Father: John de Lancie
- Website: johndelancie.com

John Sherwood de Lancie Jr. (born March 20, 1948) is an American actor. De Lancie's first television role was in Captains and the Kings in 1976. His other television series roles include Eugene Bradford in Days of Our Lives (1982–1986; 1989–1990), Frank Simmons in Stargate SG-1 (2001–2002), Donald Margolis in Breaking Bad (2009–2010), Agent Allen Shapiro in Torchwood (2011), the voice of Discord in My Little Pony: Friendship Is Magic (2011–2019), as well as Q in various Star Trek series, beginning with Star Trek: The Next Generation in 1987 and leading up to the third season of Star Trek: Strange New Worlds in 2025.

De Lancie became an outspoken secular activist and was a featured speaker at the 2016 Reason Rally and at CSICon 2019.

== Early life and education ==
De Lancie was born in Philadelphia, Pennsylvania, on March 20, 1948, one of two children born to John de Lancie (1921–2002), principal oboist of the Philadelphia Orchestra from 1954 to 1977, and Andrea de Lancie (July 3, 1920 – October 18, 2006). His mother was French. His parents met in Paris. He has a sister.

As a child, he was diagnosed with dyslexia and struggled to read throughout his school years. He did not learn to read until he was 12. One of his teachers recommended that his parents encourage him to consider a career as an actor. He began to act around the age of 14, performing in a high school production of William Shakespeare's Henry V. He went on to study acting at Kent State University (he was in attendance during the Kent State shootings on May 4, 1970) and won a scholarship to Juilliard. He performed in numerous stage productions, at venues such as the American Shakespeare Festival and the Mark Taper Forum, and established a successful career in film and television.

== Acting career ==
=== Film and TV career ===
==== Days of Our Lives ====
De Lancie's break out role was of Eugene Bradford on the soap opera Days of our Lives, which De Lancie played in episodes beginning in 1982 until 1990. His on screen partnership with actress Arleen Sorkin was called "TV's Zaniest Couple" by Soap Opera Digest in 1985.

==== Star Trek ====
De Lancie portrayed the almost-omnipotent character Q in Star Trek: The Next Generation (1987–1994), and in episodes of several subsequent Star Trek series taking place during that era. Q, notable for his chaotic, mischievous personality, is one of the few characters appearing in multiple series of the franchise: eight episodes of Star Trek: The Next Generation ("Encounter at Farpoint", "Hide and Q", "Q Who", "Deja Q", "Qpid", "True Q", "Tapestry", "All Good Things..."), one episode of Star Trek: Deep Space Nine ("Q-Less"), three episodes of Star Trek: Voyager ("Death Wish," "The Q and the Grey," "Q2"), one episode of Star Trek: Lower Decks ("Veritas"), nine episodes of Star Trek: Picard ("The Star Gazer", "Penance", "Assimilation", "Watcher", "Fly Me to the Moon", "Two of One", "Mercy", "Farewell", and "The Last Generation"), and one episode of Star Trek: Strange New Worlds ("Wedding Bell Blues"). De Lancie's son Keegan de Lancie appeared with his father as Q Junior in one episode of Star Trek: Voyager ("Q2").

My popularity is very disproportionate to the amount of times that I actually was on the show. ... It's a double-edged sword. I never partook of the financial rewards of the show in terms of being a regular, I just came on and once a year would do a show.

— De Lancie

Initially, de Lancie was too busy to audition for the part of Q, but Gene Roddenberry (whom he did not know) arranged a second opportunity. De Lancie recognized that even though Star Trek was only a small part of his career, it opened doors for him. In a 2012 interview, he said that he recalled his original audition, after which Roddenberry approached him, touched him on the shoulder, and said, "You make my writing sound better than it is."

==== Stargate ====
De Lancie also appeared on the television show Stargate SG-1 as the character Colonel Frank Simmons.

==== Other ====
De Lancie appeared in the AMC crime series Breaking Bad as Donald Margolis, the father of Jane (played by Krysten Ritter).

==== Video games ====
De Lancie voiced Antonio Malochio in Interstate '76, Trias in Planescape: Torment, Dr. Death in Outlaws, William Miles in Assassin's Creed: Revelations and Assassin's Creed III, Fitz Quadwrangle in Quantum Conundrum, and Q in both the Star Trek: The Next Generation pinball game and the mobile game Star Trek Timelines, and portrayed Q in Star Trek: Borg. He further voiced the human emperor in Master of Orion: Conquer the Stars. He also voiced Alarak in StarCraft 2: Legacy of the Void and reprised the role for Heroes of the Storm. More recently, he voiced Geist, the leader of the Templars in the XCOM 2 expansion War of the Chosen. He voiced the narrator wizard of Popup Dungeon. He also voiced the Dota 2 hero Ringmaster, released in August 2024.

=== Stage ===
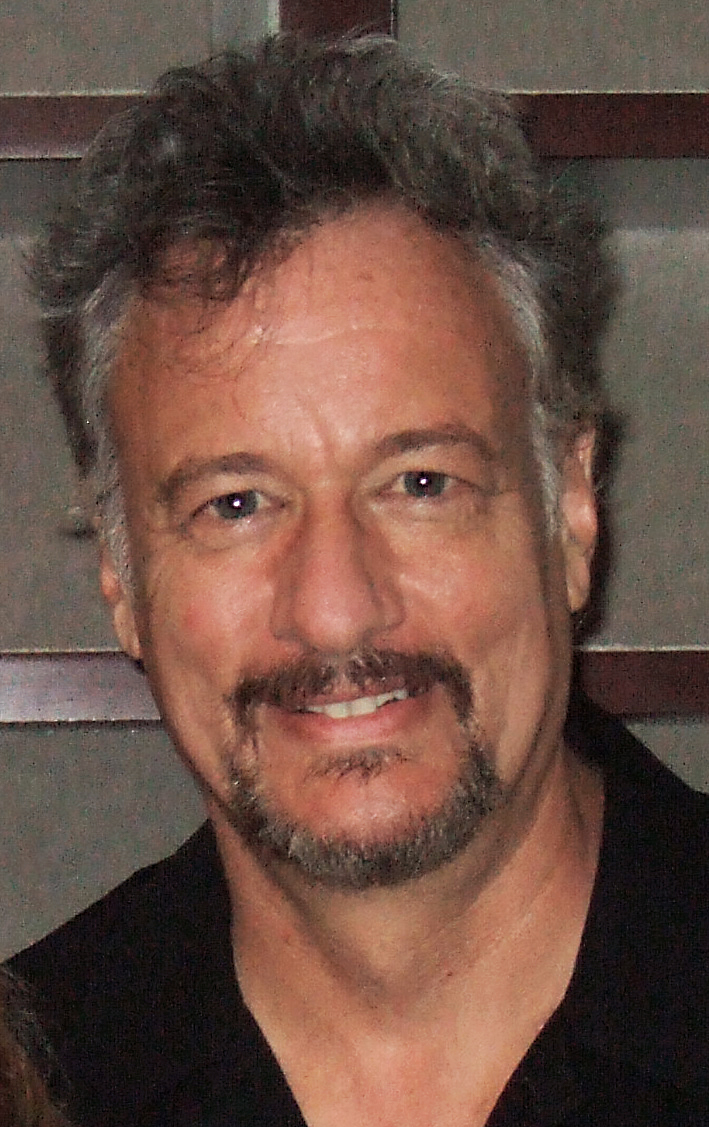
De Lancie at a performance in 2007

De Lancie is a former member of the American Shakespeare Festival, the Seattle Repertory Company, South Coast Repertory, the Mark Taper Forum, and the Old Globe (where he performed Arthur Miller's Resurrection Blues). He performed and directed for L.A. Theatre Works, the producing arm of KCRW-FM and National Public Radio where the series The Play's the Thing originated.

In the touring company Star Trek: The Music, De Lancie co-hosted and appeared with Robert Picardo (who portrayed the Doctor in Star Trek: Voyager). De Lancie and Picardo narrate around the orchestral performance, explaining the history of the music in Star Trek. He performed Pierre Curie in Alan Alda's play Radiance: The Passion of Marie Curie in 2001 at the Geffen Theater in Los Angeles. De Lancie hosted the children's concerts at Walt Disney Concert Hall during the 2003–04 season; in 2005, he hosted the children's series of the Los Angeles Philharmonic.

=== Voice acting ===
Known for his distinctive speaking style, de Lancie lent his voice to a number of projects. In My Little Pony: Friendship Is Magic, he voiced Discord, a recurring character. Discord was inspired by Q as an omnipotent being who embodies mischief and chaos, but is genuinely good-hearted and is occasionally helpful to the heroes of the show; another connection to Q is that Discord often uses fewer contractions in his vocabulary. Discord is best described as an anti-hero, also similar to Q. Initially, Lauren Faust wanted to cast someone who could impersonate de Lancie, but Hasbro suggested casting de Lancie himself. Ironically, de Lancie has stated in an interview that, in preparation for his role as Discord, he did not draw from his past experience as Q. De Lancie mentioned during a 2013 convention panel that his voice recordings of Discord are slightly sped up and lose their deep bass sound. Nevertheless, fans still praised de Lancie for his performance. According to Jim Miller in The Art of Equestria, de Lancie's sessions are always done by phone, but his first session as Discord was videotaped.

His other animated television roles included The Angry Beavers, Extreme Ghostbusters, Invader Zim, Duck Dodgers, Max Steel, Duckman, Young Justice, and DC Super Hero Girls as Mr. Freeze.

=== Writing ===
De Lancie co-wrote the Star Trek novel I, Q with Peter David, as well as co-writing the novel Soldier of Light (with Tom Cool). He wrote the DC comic book story The Gift. In 1996, along with Leonard Nimoy and writer-producer Nat Segaloff, de Lancie formed and recorded Alien Voices, a collection of audio dramas based on classic science fiction and fantasy stories, such as The Time Machine and The Lost World.

=== Music ===
De Lancie has performed as narrator with a number of major orchestras including the New York Philharmonic, the Los Angeles Philharmonic, the Philadelphia Orchestra, the Sydney Symphony Orchestra, the National Symphony Orchestra, the Montreal Symphony Orchestra and Symphony Nova Scotia. He provided the narration for the world premiere of Lorenzo Palomo's The Sneetches and Other Stories (based on the book by Dr. Seuss) with the Oberlin Conservatory Orchestra. He wrote and directed ten symphonic plays, which were produced with the Milwaukee, St. Paul Chamber, Ravinia, Los Angeles, and Pasadena Orchestras.

De Lancie was the writer, director and host of First Nights, an adult concert series at the Walt Disney Concert Hall with the Los Angeles Philharmonic, based loosely on the book of the same name by Thomas Forrest Kelly, which explored the life and music of Stravinsky, Beethoven, Mahler, Schumann, and Prokofiev. In 2006, de Lancie made his opera directorial debut with the Atlanta Opera performing Puccini's "Tosca" from May 18–21.

In September 2019, de Lancie narrated as "Forever of the Stars" in the first ever live performances of Ayreon's Sci-Fi concept album Into the Electric Castle.

=== Documentary ===
While on stage at the 2012 Ottawa ComicCon, de Lancie announced that he had made plans to co-produce a documentary about "bronies" (older, usually male teenage and adult fans of My Little Pony: Friendship Is Magic). He said he was taken aback by how disrespectfully national news media portrayed the brony fandom. He started a Kickstarter campaign to help fund the documentary, since titled Bronies: The Extremely Unexpected Adult Fans of My Little Pony. The campaign began on May 13, 2012, and by June 10 had reached $322,022, becoming Kickstarter's second-highest funded film project of all time.

== Activism ==
Raised by secular parents, de Lancie is an advocate for atheism and humanism. Of his education in a religious school in Philadelphia, he remembers associating religion with manipulation. Rather than developing a religious outlook, he became fascinated by an ever-changing world: "I'm wondering if one of the things at the core of believing in God, or not, has to do with change. I have grown to embrace change. Personally, I love reading the science section in the paper every morning. I'm in awe of humankind's boundless curiosity."

On May 28, 2016, the American Humanist Association awarded him the Humanist Arts Award.

On June 4, 2016, he addressed the participants at the Reason Rally in Washington, D.C. Speaking in reference to his Star Trek character Q, he said:

My name is John de Lancie, and I am a god. At least, I've played one on TV. And I'm here to tell you as a god that I was created by humans. And the words I spoke were written by men and women ... My creators took great care in exalting me to the position I hold today. And just like all the gods before me—Zeus, Baal, Yahweh—my god creators wanted you to believe that I am the omnipotent one. ... Truth be told, ... I don't exist any more than the thousands of other gods that humans have created, worshipped, and died for since the beginning of time. ... But if you insist on believing in me, you do so at your own risk. ... I will lead you down the path of ignorance, intolerance, and bigotry. ... All because you believe.

On July 14, 2017, de Lancie attended the unveiling of a statue of Clarence Darrow at the Rhea County Courthouse, Dayton, Tennessee, the site of the Scopes Trial in 1925, where Darrow had argued in favor of the teaching of evolution and secular education.

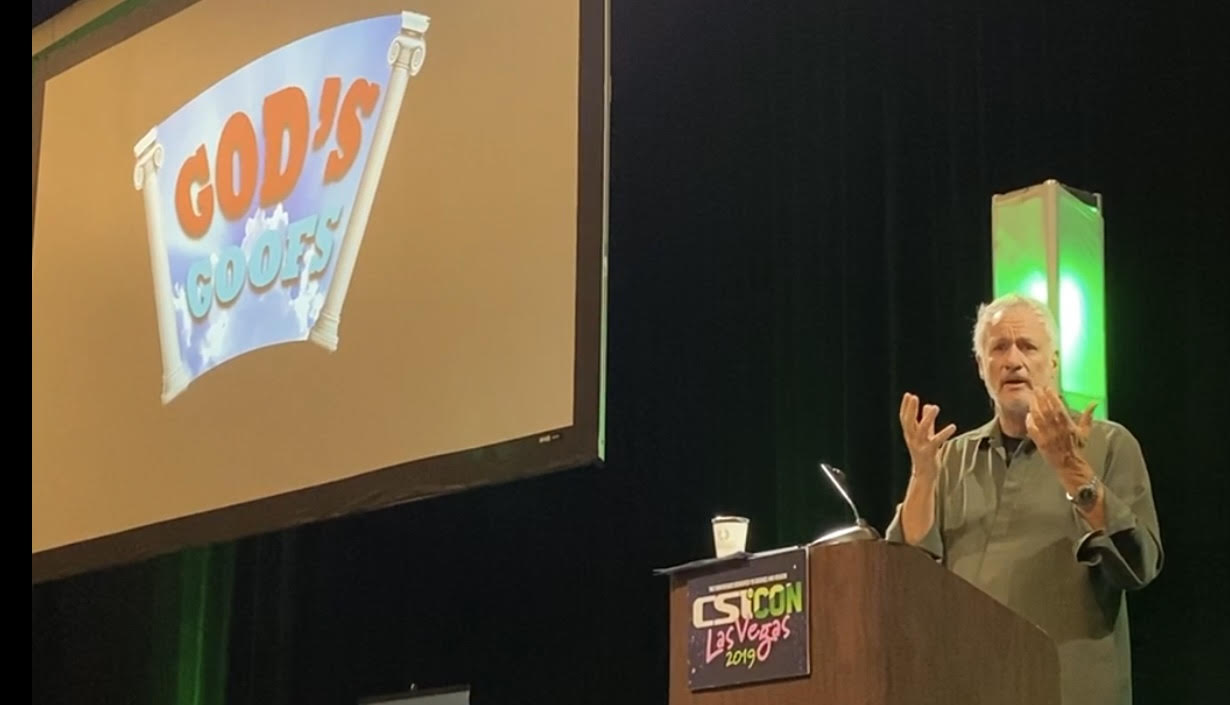
De Lancie speaking at CSICon 2019

In October 2019, de Lancie was a featured speaker at the annual conference of the Center for Inquiry, CSICon. At the conference he announced two new projects. The first, an animated series, titled God's Goofs, is meant to point out that intelligent design is absurd. The second project is a play based on the historic intelligent design trial Kitzmiller v. Dover Area School District (2005) in Dover, Pennsylvania — the first direct challenge brought in US federal courts testing a public school district policy that required the teaching of intelligent design.

== Personal life ==
De Lancie is married to Marnie Mosiman, with whom he has two sons: Keegan (b. 1984) and a younger son, Owen (b. 1987).

De Lancie is an experienced sailor, spending time on the Pacific Ocean, which he said "sometimes involves very terrifying experiences."

He is long-time friends with fellow Star Trek alum Kate Mulgrew. He is also good friends with MacGyver and Stargate SG-1 star Richard Dean Anderson, with whom he has appeared in episodes of both series, and in the 1995 television series Legend.

== Filmography ==
=== Film ===
List of performances and appearances by John de Lancie in film
Year	Title	Role	Notes
1979	The Onion Field	LAPD Lieutenant No. 2	
1990	Bad Influence	Howard	
1990	Taking Care of Business	Ted Bradford Jr.	
1991	The Fisher King	TV Executive	
1992	The Hand that Rocks the Cradle	Dr. Victor Mott	
1993	Arcade	Difford	
1993	Fearless	Jeff Gordon	
1994	Deep Red	Thomas Newmeyer	
1995	Evolver	Russell Bennett	
1996	Multiplicity	Ted Gray	
1997	Trekkies	Himself	
1997	Final Descent	George Bouchard	
1998	Saving Private Ryan	Letter-Reader	Voice; Uncredited
1998	You Lucky Dog	Lyle Windsor	
1999	Final Run	George Bouchard	
2000	Woman on Top	Alex Reeves	
2001	Nicolas	Dr. Fisher	
2001	Good Advice	Ted	
2007	Reign Over Me	Nigel Pennington	
2007	Teenius	Principal Senseman	
2008	My Apocalypse	Nathan Eastman	
2008	Pathology	Dr. Quentin Morris	
2009	Crank: High Voltage	Fish Halman	
2009	Gamer	Chief of Staff	
2013	Bronies: The Extremely Unexpected Adult Fans of My Little Pony	Himself	Co-producer
2015	Visions	Victor Napoli	
2017	Olaf's Frozen Adventure	Mr. Olsen	Voice; Featurette
2018	Buttons: A Christmas Tale	Johnson	
2024	Identiteaze	Steve	

=== Television ===
List of performances and appearances by John de Lancie in television
Year	Title	Role	Notes
1977	Barnaby Jones	Grady	Episode: "Terror on a Quiet Afternoon"
1977	McMillan & Wife	Powell	
1977	SST: Death Flight	Bob Connors	Television film
1977–1978	The Six Million Dollar Man	Various Characters	
1978–1979	Emergency!	Dr. Neil Colby/Dr. Deroy	3 episodes
1978	The Bastard	Lt. Stark	
1979	Battlestar Galactica	Officer	Episode: "Experiment in Terra"
1981	It's a Living	Tom Morton	Episode: "The Wedding"
1981	Nero Wolfe	Tom Irwin	Episode: "Might as Well Be Dead"
1982–1986, 1989–1990	Days of Our Lives	Eugene Bradford	
1983	The Thorn Birds	Alastair MacQueen	Miniseries
1986	Gone to Texas	John Van Fossen	Television film
1986	The Twilight Zone	The Dispatcher	Episode: "Dead Run"
1986	MacGyver	Brian Ashford	Episode: "The Escape"
1986	Murder, She Wrote	Binky Holborn	Episode: "If the Frame Fits"
1987–1994	Star Trek: The Next Generation	Q	8 episodes
1988	Trial and Error	Bob Adams	Regular cast
1988	Mission: Impossible	Matthew Drake	Episode: "The Killer"
1988	Hooperman	Lucius Cain	Episode: "High Noon"
1989	Get Smart, Again!	Major Preston Waterhouse	Uncredited
1989	The Nutt House	Norman Shrike	Episode: "Pilot"
1991	L.A. Law	Mark Chelios	Episode: "The Beverly Hill Hangers"
1992	The Young Riders	Lyle Wicks	Episode: "Good Night Sweet Charlotte"
1993	Star Trek: Deep Space Nine	Q	Episode: "Q-Less"
1993	Batman: The Animated Series	Eagleton	Voice, 2 episodes
1993	Time Trax	Gandolf Reicher	Episode: "Beautiful Songbird"
1993	Matlock	Dr. Albert Levinson	Episode: "The Haunted"
1994	Without Warning	Barry Steinbrenner	Television film
1995	Legend	Janos Bartok	
1996	Picket Fences	District Attorney	Episode: "Three Weddings and a Meltdown"
1996	Touched by an Angel	Justinian Jones	Episode: "Jones vs. God"
1996–1997	The Real Adventures of Jonny Quest	Dr. Quest	Voice, 17 episodes
1996–2001	Star Trek: Voyager	Q	3 episodes
1997	Duckman	Tyler Fitzgerald	Episode: "From Brad to Worse"
2000	The Angry Beavers	The Yak in the Sack	Voice, episode: "Yak in the Sack"
2000	The Outer Limits	Donald Finley	Episode: "The Gun"
2000	The West Wing	Al Kiefer	2 episodes
2000	Sports Night	Bert Stors	Episode: "April is the Cruelest Month"
2001–2002	Andromeda	Sid Barry alias Sam Profitt	2 episodes
2001–2002	Stargate SG-1	Frank Simmons, Goa'uld	5 episodes
2001–2002	Max Steel	L'Etranger; Military Base Guard	Voice; 3 episodes
2001	Special Unit 2	King of the Links	Episode: "The Eve"
2001	The Practice	Walter Bannish	
2002	Crossing Jordan	Medical Examiner Thaxton	Episode: "Payback"
2002	Dan Dare: Pilot of the Future	Gerard Hamilton	Voice, 2 episodes
2003	Judging Amy	Dr. Eagan	Episode: "Picture of Perfect"
2003	Duck Dodgers	Sinestro	Voice, episode: "The Green Loontern"
2004	NYPD Blue	Scott Garvin	Episode: "Divorce Detective Style"
2004–2005	Charmed	Odin	4 episodes
2005	The Closer	Dr. Dawson	Episode: "Flashpoint
2005	Invader Zim	Agent Darkbootie	Voice, 2 episodes
2008	The Unit	Elliott Gillum	Episode: "Dancing Lessons"
2009	Greek	Himself	Episode: "The Dork Knight"
2009–2010	Breaking Bad	Donald Margolis	4 episodes
2011	Law & Order: LA	Judge Avery Staynor	Episode: "Carthay Circle"
2011	Franklin & Bash	Gallen	Episode "Bachelor Party"
2011	Torchwood: Miracle Day	Agent Allen Shapiro	3 episodes
2011	Young Justice	Mister Twister	Voice, episode: "Welcome to Happy Harbor"
2011–2019	My Little Pony: Friendship Is Magic	Discord	Voice, 24 episodes
2012	NTSF:SD:SUV::	Leonardo da Vinci	Episode: "Time Angels"
2012	The Secret Circle	Royce Armstrong	Episode: "Crystal"
2014	The Mentalist	Edward Feinberg	Episode: "Silver Wings of Times"
2014	CSI: Crime Scene Investigation	General Robert Landsdale	Episode: "Boston Brakes"
2015	The Librarians	Mephistopheles	Episode: "And the Infernal Contract"
2016	Justice League Action	Brainiac	Voice, 2 episodes
2017	Star Trek Continues	Galisti	Episode: "What Ships Are For"
2019	DC Super Hero Girls	Mr. Freeze	Voice
2020	Star Trek: Lower Decks	Q	Voice, episode: "Veritas"
2022–2023	Dota: Dragon's Blood	Lord Ritterfau	Voice, 2 episodes
2022–2023	Star Trek: Picard	Q	8 episodes
2024	Masters of the Universe Revolution	Granamyr	Voice; 2 episodes
2025	Star Trek: Strange New Worlds	Q	Episode: "Wedding Bell Blues"
2026	X-Men '97	Nathaniel Richards / Kang the Conqueror / Rama-Tut	Voice; 2 episodes

=== Video games ===
List of performances in video games
Year	Title	Role
1996	Star Trek: Borg	Q
1997	Outlaws	Matthew 'Dr. Death' Jackson
1997	Interstate '76	Antonio Malochio
1998	Star Trek: The Game Show	Q
1998	Interstate '76 Arsenal	Antonio Malochio
1999	Gabriel Knight 3: Blood of the Sacred, Blood of the Damned	Montreaux
1999	Planescape: Torment	Trias the Betrayer
2000	Star Trek: ConQuest Online	Q
2011	Assassin's Creed: Revelations	William Miles
2012	Quantum Conundrum	Professor Fitz Quadwrangle
2012	Assassin's Creed III	William Miles
2014	Family Guy: The Quest for Stuff	Q
2015	StarCraft II: Legacy of the Void	Alarak
2015	My Little Pony, Twilight's Kingdom Storybook App	Discord
2016	Master of Orion: Conquer the Stars	Human Emperor
2016	Heroes of the Storm	Alarak
2016	StarCraft II: Nova Covert Ops	Alarak
2016	World of Warcraft: Legion	Vydhar / Morphael
2017	XCOM 2: War of the Chosen	Geist
2018	Payday 2	46th President of the United States
2019	Call of Duty: Black Ops 4	Rushmore
2024	Dota 2	Ringmaster
2026	Star Trek: Voyager - Across the Unknown	Q

=== Podcast series ===
List of performances in podcast series
Year	Title	Role
2019	Frontiers	Narrator
2023	NPRmageddon	John
2023	Shuttlepod Show	guest
