= Section 31 (Star Trek) =

Fictional secret service

- Star Trek organization

In-universe information
- Type: Autonomous intelligence and counter-intelligence agency
- Founded: Prior to 2151
- Location: Alpha and Beta Quadrants
- Leader: Unknown (mostly); Ash Tyler (2258–22??)
- Key people: Harris (2150s); Philippa Georgiou (2250s); Leland (until 2257); Luther Sloan (2370s)
- Purpose: Defend the United Federation of Planets by any means necessary.
- Technologies: Classified Federation technologies
- Affiliations: United Earth (superseded); United Federation of Planets

In the fictional universe of Star Trek, Section 31 is an autonomous intelligence and defense organization that carries out covert operations for the United Federation of Planets. Created by Ira Steven Behr for the Star Trek: Deep Space Nine episode "Inquisition", the organization was intended to act as a counterbalance to the utopian portrayal of the Federation.

Section 31 settings and characters have appeared in dozens of episodes, novels and comics, including the 2025 television film, Star Trek: Section 31.

== Production ==
Ira Steven Behr was inspired by a line of dialogue from Deep Space Nine episode "The Maquis" spoken by Commander Benjamin Sisko: "It's easy to be a saint in paradise." Behr said in the 1999 reference companion to the series, "Why is Earth a paradise in the twenty-fourth century? Well, maybe it's because there's someone watching over it and doing the nasty stuff that no one wants to think about." He expressed an interest of exploring what life was really like for those living the fictional 24th century, saying "Is it this paradise, or are there, as Harold Pinter said, 'Weasels under the coffee table'."

The name, Section 31, is explained in the story as being taken from the Starfleet Charter: Article 14, Section 31. The article, according to agents, allowed for extraordinary measures to be taken in times of extreme threat. Such measures included malicious sabotage of enemy installations and technology, biological warfare, and preemptive assassination.

According to Ronald D. Moore there was considerable debate on the origin of the organization, in particular on how it was formed and how long ago.

Costume designer Bob Blackman chose the black leather costumes worn by Section 31 agents to appear fascistic. Behr had asked for dark black, severe, hostile-looking costumes. In Star Trek: The Human Frontier, Michèle and Duncan Barrett explain that Section 31 agents not wearing Starfleet uniforms or dressing as Federation citizens further enhanced their role as an organization that is not constrained by ethics.

== Reception ==
Writer David Weddle said many fans felt Section 31 betrayed the value system intended by Star Trek creator Gene Roddenberry, while others were indifferent or intrigued. "Fans would get into these long ethical and political arguments, really struggling with issues like that, which was great to see." Moore replied to criticisms of betrayal saying, "The idea that there's a rogue element within the Federation doing dark deeds outside the normal chain of command is certainly a provocative one."

Actor Jeffrey Combs, who portrayed numerous characters throughout Star Trek, enjoyed the appearances of Section 31, saying in 2000 that the stories "gave everything a real flair."

== Characters ==
In order of appearance:

- ‡ First appearance as a Section 31 operative.
- ^{κ} Kelvin Universe film.

Actor	Character	First appearance	Notes
Star Trek: Deep Space Nine
William Sadler	Luther Sloan	"Inquisition"	Former Starfleet intelligence who joined Section 31 sometime before 2374.
Star Trek: Enterprise
Dominic Keating	Malcolm Reed	"Broken Bow"; "Affliction" ‡	Tactical officer aboard the Enterprise NX–01 recruited by Section 31 sometime after graduating Starfleet Academy.
Eric Pierpoint	Harris	"Affliction" ‡	A former Starfleet Intelligence officer who ordered Malcolm Reed to sabotage evidence of a Klingon attack.
Star Trek Into Darkness ^{κ}
Noel Clarke	Thomas Harewood	Destroyed a secret weapons facility in 2259 after his terminally ill daughter was saved by John Harrison.	
Benedict Cumberbatch	John Harrison	Pseudonymous with Khan Noonien Singh.; Recruited into Section 31 by Alexander Marcus to assist in the militarization of Starfleet in 2258.	
Peter Weller	Alexander Marcus	Commander-in-Charge of Starfleet until 2259.; Recruited John Harrison to assist in the militarization of Starfleet.	
Star Trek: Discovery
Shazad Latif	Ash Tyler (human) / Voq (Klingon)	"The Vulcan Hello"; "Point of Light" ‡	As Voq, he was Torchbearer for the Klingon spiritual leader T'Kuvma.; He was surgically altered to appear human, and planted aboard the USS Discovery as Ash Tyler, instilled with Tyler's (dominant) consciousness.; He briefly served as Torchbearer for High Chancellor L'Rell.; In 2258, Tyler is promoted to the rank of Commander and becomes the head of Section 31.
Michelle Yeoh	Philippa Georgiou (alternate)	"The Wolf Inside"; "Point of Light" ‡	Former autocratic emperor of the Terran Empire from the alternate reality known as the Mirror Universe.; Transported to the prime reality by Michael Burnham, and exiled on Qo'noS.
Jayne Brook	Katrina Cornwell	"The Butcher's Knife Cares Not for the Lamb's Cry"; "The Sounds of Thunder" ‡	Starfleet Flag Officer with operational command of Section 31.
Alan van Sprang	Leland	"Will You Take My Hand?" ‡ (bonus scene)	Agent sent to recruit the exiled Emperor Philippa Georgiou.; Commander of NCIA-93, a Section 31 starship with cloak capability.
Alan van Sprang	Control (artificial intelligence)	"If Memory Serves"	Rogue artificial intelligence originally developed by Section 31 on behalf of Starfleet.; Originally programmed to conduct threat analysis and research for Starfleet.; Coerced the crew of the Discovery into delivering information to it about advanced artificial intelligence.; Occupied the body of Leland via some kind of nanotechnology transfer.
Tara Nicodemo	Patar (Vulcan)	"If Memory Serves"	Starfleet Flag Officer, with operational command of Section 31, who was murdered by Control.; Her likeness was used by Control to communicate with the crews of Discovery and NCIA-93, and with Admiral Cornwell.
Sonja Sohn	Gabrielle Burnham / Red Angel	"The Red Angel"	Engineer responsible for the development of time travel technology commissioned by Section 31, which was dependent on a quantum time crystal stolen from the Klingon planet Boreth.; Burnham was displaced in the future following a Klingon raid on her research facility approximately twenty to twenty-five years before "The Vulcan Hello".
Star Trek: Lower Decks
Jack Quaid	William Boimler (transporter duplicate)	"Kayshon, His Eyes Open"; "Crisis Point 2: Paradoxus" ‡	Junior grade Lieutenant under William Riker who fakes his death to join Section 31. Later promoted to captain of the Defiant-class ship Anaximander performing missions for Section 31.

== Appearances ==
=== Deep Space Nine (1998–99) ===
- "Inquisition"
- "Inter Arma Enim Silent Leges"
- "Extreme Measures"

=== Enterprise (2005) ===
- "Affliction"
- "Divergence"
- "Demons"
- "Terra Prime"

=== Discovery (2018–19) ===
- "Will You Take My Hand?" (Season 1, bonus scene)
- "Point of Light"
- "Saints of Imperfection"
- "The Sounds of Thunder"
- "Light and Shadows"
- "If Memory Serves"
- "Project Daedalus"
- "The Red Angel"
- "Perpetual Infinity"
- "Through the Valley of Shadows"
- "Such Sweet Sorrow"
- "Such Sweet Sorrow, Part 2"

=== Lower Decks (2020–2024) ===
- "Envoys" (references to Section 31)
- "Crisis Point 2: Paradoxus"
- "Fissure Quest"

=== Picard (2023) ===
- "Disengage" (Raffi is working for Section 31)
- "The Bounty" (references to Section 31)

=== Films ===
- Star Trek Into Darkness (2013)
- Star Trek: Section 31 (2025)

== Tie-in media ==
=== Novels ===
Section 31 characters appear in the following novels:

Title	Author(s)	Date	ISBN
Star Trek: Deep Space Nine
What You Leave Behind (novelization)	Diane Carey	June 1999	0-671-03476-6
Hollow Men	Una McCormack	April 26, 2005	0-7434-9151-3
Star Trek: The Next Generation
A Time to Kill	David Mack	July 27, 2004	0-7434-9177-7
A Time to Heal	David Mack	August 31, 2004	0-7434-9178-5
Collateral Damage	David Mack	October 8, 2019	978-1-9821-1358-2
Star Trek: Enterprise
The Good That Men Do	Andy Mangels and Michael A. Martin	February 27, 2007	978-0-7434-4001-1
Kobayashi Maru	Andy Mangels and Michael A. Martin	August 26, 2008	978-1-4165-5480-6
Beneath the Raptor's Wing	Michael A. Martin	October 20, 2009	978-1-4391-0798-0
To Brave the Storm	Michael A. Martin	October 25, 2011	978-1-4516-0715-4
A Choice of Futures	Christopher L. Bennett	June 25, 2013	978-1-4767-0674-0
Patterns of Interference	Christopher L. Bennett	August 29, 2017	978-1-5011-6570-2
Star Trek: Typhon Pact
Zero Sum Game	David Mack	October 26, 2010	978-1-4391-6079-4
Raise the Dawn	David R. George III	June 26, 2012	978-1-4516-4956-7
Plagues of Night	David R. George III	May 29, 2013	978-1-4516-4955-0
Others
The Future Begins (Corps of Engineers, Book 62)	Steve Mollmann and Michael Schuster	April 1, 2006	1-4165-2046-5
A Ceremony of Losses (The Fall, Book 3)	David Mack	October 29, 2013	978-1-4767-2224-5
Elusive Salvation	Dayton Ward	April 26, 2016	978-1-5011-1129-7

==== Section 31 crossover series ====
Star Trek: Section 31 is a crossover miniseries that includes four thematically linked novels from each of the television series which had aired before 2001, excluding Enterprise. The series was relaunched in 2014 as part of the Deep Space Nine book line.

No.	Title	Author(s)	Date	ISBN
1	Rogue (The Next Generation)	Andy Mangels and Michael A. Martin	May 22, 2001	0-671-77477-8
2	Shadow (Voyager)	Dean Wesley Smith and Kristine Kathryn Rusch	May 22, 2001	0-671-77478-6
3	Cloak	S. D. Perry	June 26, 2001	0-671-77471-9
4	Abyss (Deep Space Nine)	David Weddle and Jeffrey Lang	June 26, 2001	0-671-77483-2

==== Section 31 relaunch series ====
Novels linked to Deep Space Nine and Next Generation relaunch book lines. The story continues in Collateral Damage (2019), also by David Mack.

Title	Author	Date	ISBN
Disavowed	David Mack	October 28, 2014	978-1-4767-5308-9
Control	David Mack	March 28, 2017	978-1-5011-5170-5

=== Graphic novels ===
All comics published by IDW Publishing.

Collection	Issue(s)	Date	ISBN
The Space Between (The Next Generation)	"An Inconvenient Truth" (Part 6)	September 25, 2007	978-1-60010-116-8
Year Four: The Enterprise Experiment	Part 5	November 18, 2008	978-1-60010-279-0
Mission's End	Parts 1 – 5	November 3, 2009	978-1-60010-540-1
Star Trek, Vol. 3	The Return of the Archons, Part 1	November 27, 2012	978-1-61377-515-8
Star Trek, Vol. 6	After Darkness, Parts 1 – 3	November 26, 2013	978-1-61377-796-1
Star Trek, Vol. 7	The Khitomer Conflict, Parts 1 – 4	April 1, 2014	978-1-61377-882-1
Khan	Parts 1, 4, and 5	June 3, 2014	978-1-61377-895-1

=== Star Trek Online ===
Star Trek Online is a massively multiplayer online role-playing game developed by Cryptic Studios. The game has continued to receive updates which are organized into episodes containing five to seven missions each. All Section 31 missions are introduced by Franklin Drake, a character created for the game.

Episode	Missions	Available
"Cardassian Struggle"	Suspect (removed from game)	February 2, 2010 – October 27, 2015
"Specters"	Skirmish (Mission 1)	October 16, 2010
"Specters"	Traelus System – Satellite Repair (locked mission)	October 16, 2010
"Specters"	Spin the Wheel (Mission 2)	October 23, 2010
"Specters"	What Lies Beneath (Mission 3)	October 30, 2010
"Specters"	Everything Old is New (Mission 4)	November 6, 2010
"Specters"	Night of the Comet (Mission 5)	November 13, 2010
—	Hearts and Minds (special mission)	April 12, 2012
"Romulan Mystery"	Empress Sela (Mission 2)	January 29, 2015

== See also ==
- Starfleet
- United Federation of Planets
