= Star Trek: The Lost Era =

Novel series

- The Sundered (2003) by Michael A. Martin and Andy Mangels
- Author: Various
- Country: United States
- Language: English
- Genre: Science fiction
- Publisher: Pocket Books
- Published: 2003–2014
- Media type: Print (Paperback)
- No. of books: 7
- Website: startrekbooks.com

Star Trek: The Lost Era is a series of seven thematically linked novels that explore the period between the film The Undiscovered Country and The Next Generation episode "Encounter at Farpoint". The series was conceived and edited by Mario Palmieri, and published by Pocket Books.

The Buried Age (2007), by Christopher L. Bennett, and the Terok Nor (2008) trilogy, were marketed as "Tales of the Lost Era".

== Production ==
Editor Marco Palmieri explained in Voyages of Imagination, "Like the Section 31 [series] two years earlier, The Lost Era was designed to give readers options." The novels would be thematically linked, but not narratively linked. Each would stand alone, with readers able to read as many novels of the series as desired. Palmieri hoped "the series would move Star Trek fiction through an unknown, and unexplored period."

"The era is framed by two key historical moments," said Palmeiri. The books explore the period between the death of James T. Kirk aboard the Enterprise-B, as seen in Star Trek Generations, and the maiden voyage of Enterprise-D, as seen in "Encounter at Farpoint". "We knew far less about discoveries, first contacts, scientific breakthroughs, etc." said Palmeiri. "I’d already committed to doing two stories that were specifically military in nature, the Tomed Incident and the Betreka Nebula Incident. But I’m a guy who likes variety, so when I sent out my notes to the authors, I told them, ‘Okay, looking at the timeline of established events, its easy to get the impression that there was[…]'"

=== The Sundered (2003) ===
For The Sundered, Michael A. Martin presented the concept of a companion race to humans, similar to the relationship between Romulans and Vulcans, while on a long-distance phone call with Palmieri. Martin and co-writer Andy Mangels explored such a premise while plotting the novel and "all sorts of continuity Easter eggs just presented themselves."

The human descended Neyel species created for The Sundered were included in Martin and Mangels novel The Red King (2005).

=== Serpents Among the Ruins (2003) ===
While completing Twilight, the first book of the Deep Space Nine miniseries Mission Gamma, David R. George III was approached by Palmieri to write a novel exploring the events surrounding the Tomed Incident. The event led to the signing of the Treaty of Algeron in 2311 between the United Federation of Planets and the Romulan Empire, and the Federation's ban of military uses of cloaking technology. The incident was first mentioned in the Next Generation episode "The Neutral Zone".

The novel was written as a form of rehabilitation of the reputation of John Harriman, captain of the Enterprise-B. Elements from The Captain's Daughter (1995), by Peter David, were also included. George said he included additional scenes in Twilight which "later made [his] life difficult" while completing Serpents.

=== The Art of the Impossible (2003) ===
The Art of the Impossible, written by Keith DeCandido, was inspired on a brief conversation between Julian Bashir and Elim Garak in the Deep Space Nine episode "The Way of the Warrior". The Betreka Nebula Incident, as discussed, was a violent, eighteen-year, territorial dispute between the Cardassian Union and the Klingon Empire. According to DeCandido, the period between the Khitomer Massacre and the forced annexation of Bajor was exactly eighteen years.

=== Well of Souls (2003) ===
Well of Souls began as an amalgam of three pitch outlines developed by Ilsa J. Bick. Palmieri told Bick he liked the first and third, and to combine the stories into one, and to "make up a crew." Bick wrote the novel during the winter of 2002, with guidance from both Dean Wesley Smith and Keith DeCandido.

According to Bick, Well of Souls was the longest Star Trek novel published by Pocket Books, however, it was not approved for publication until the page count was reduced to less than 500 pages. Palmieri achieved by removing chapter page breaks. According to Bick, Palmieri insisted the story be told "the way it was" the book be published as is.

=== Deny Thy Father (2003) ===
Jeff Mariotte's Deny Thy Father explores the relationship between William Riker and his estranged father Kyle, who was featured in the Next Generation episode "The Icarus Factor". Mariotte explained it is a story about how "two men who hadn’t spoken in fifteen years could turn out to be so similar … but also about fathers and sons."

The planned title of the novel was Daedelus. Daedelus (2003) by Dave Stern, an Enterprise novel, was due for publication to Mariotte submitting his manuscript. Deny Thy Father was chosen as the alternate title.

=== Catalyst of Sorrows (2003) ===
Margaret Wander Bonanno contacted the editors at Pocket Books to inquire about writing a new Star Trek novel, at the urging of fans. Ten years had passed since the publication of Probe (1992), which was surrounded by some controversy, and Bonanno was concerned she had been blacklisted by the editors at Simon & Schuster and or by Paramount Pictures, who owned Star Trek at the time. Palmieri assured her there was no such thing, and asked she contribute to the Lost Era.

Uhura was chosen by Bonanno as the novel's protagonist "to show aspects of [her] character we never got to see onscreen." Bonanno had previously worked with Nichelle Nichols on the novel Saturn's Child (1995).

=== One Constant Star (2014) ===
One Constant Star, by David R. George III, is a sequel to Serpents Among the Ruins, set eight years post. George said the novel explores "the notion of responsibility—to a person's sworn duty, to their loved ones, and to themselves."

== Reception ==
"If I have any regrets about [the] Lost Era," said Palmieri in Voyages of Imagination, "it’s that there was less thematic variety among the stories than I was hoping for. In putting together notes about the period to help the authors get started, I realized that most of the things that had been established about those years were military in nature—wars, battles, etc." Jacqueline Bundy of TrekToday complimented the writers of The Sundered (2003) for cleverly explaining "previous inconsistencies while at the same time adhering to established continuity."

Darren Mooney noted, "The Lost Era is a collection of Star Trek novels designed to plug various holes in continuity[.]" In his review of Serpents Among the Ruins (2003), Mooney said, "You’d imagine that Serpents Among the Ruins is a mess of references and allusions, a bunch of Star Trek in-jokes fashioned into a novel. It is to the credit of writer David George III that it actually does an excellent job of standing on its own two feet." Jason Garza of SFReader.com noted "the action is intense, and the character building is superb" which showcased George's outstanding craft.

In her review of The Art of the Impossible, Jacqueline Bundy said, "This book does more than just fill in a bit more of the history of the Star Trek universe (although it does that in spades): it illustrates the 'whys' behind that history with flair, style and more than a few surprises." Lynn Nicole Louis of SFReader.com said, "Although based in the Star Trek world, [The Art of the Impossible] would pretty much appeal to any fan of science fiction." Keith DeCandido said the novel was among his most ambitious, and one "he is still very proud of."

Reception of Deny Thy Father was not as enthusiastic as the previous novels. Darren Mooney said the novel does not make the "father-son relationship glimpsed in The Icarus Factor seem any more exciting." Lynn Nicole Louis of SFReader.com agreed, saying the novel trivial, containing "fabricated events designed to illustrate some portion of Will Riker’s personality."

Jason Garza of SFReader.com said Catalyst of Sorrows "is not an easy read by any means. But that should not be a deterrent. If anything, it requires the reader to think, and it shows that the author knows how to tell an intelligent, compelling, riveting story[.]" Of the entire series, Bundy said, "The Lost Era titles are individual stories that each stand on their own merits and each should be judged accordingly." And that, "As the final installment, Catalyst of Sorrows is an entirely satisfying way to wrap up this series[.]"

In a review of One Constant Star, a staff writer at TrekCore.com said the novel "made me truly care about these characters." And the novel explored "something greater than the vastness of the cosmos: our own human frailties and strengths."

== Novels ==
No.	Title	Author(s)	Date	ISBN
1	The Sundered	Michael A. Martin and Andy Mangels	July 29, 2003	0-7434-6401-X
2	Serpents Among the Ruins	David R. George III	August 26, 2003	0-7434-6403-6
3	The Art of the Impossible	Keith DeCandido	September 30, 2003	0-7434-6405-2
4	Well of Souls	Ilsa J. Bick	October 28, 2003	0-7434-6375-7
5	Deny Thy Father	Jeff Mariotte	November 25, 2003	0-7434-6409-5
6	Catalyst of Sorrows	Margaret Wander Bonanno	December 30, 2003	0-7434-6407-9
—	One Constant Star	David R. George III	May 27, 2014	978-1-4767-5021-7

=== Tales of the Lost Era (2007–08) ===
The Buried Age (2007), a Next Generation novel by Christopher L. Bennett, and the Terok Nor (2008) miniseries were marketed as "Tales of the Lost Era". Fansites, such as Memory Alpha, grouped the novels with the Lost Era. In a 2014, StarTrek.com referred to the Lost Era as a "long-running" series. It is unclear if long-running referred to the novels marketed as "Tales of…" published after Catalyst of Sorrows (2003), or to the addition of One Constant Star (2014), by David R. George to the Lost Era series.

Title	Author(s)	Date	ISBN
The Buried Age (Note: The Buried Age (2007), by Christopher L. Bennett, was marketed by Pocket Books as a "Tale of The Lost Era".) (The Next Generation)	Christopher L. Bennett	June 26, 2007	978-1-4165-3739-7
Day of the Vipers (Terok Nor, Book 1)	James Swallow	March 25, 2008	978-1-4165-5093-8
Night of the Wolves (Terok Nor, Book 2)	S. D. Perry and Britta Dennison	April 29, 2008	978-0-7434-8251-6
Dawn of the Eagles (Terok Nor, Book 3)	S. D. Perry and Britta Dennison	May 20, 2008	978-0-7434-8252-3

=== Related novels ===
Novels featuring characters from the series, and as well as novels with a similar premise:

Title	Author(s)	Date	ISBN
The Captain's Daughter (Star Trek, Book 76)	Peter David	December 1995	0-671-52047-4
Tales from the Captain's Table (anthology) – "Iron and Sacrifice" by David R. George III	Keith DeCandido, ed.	June 14, 2005	1-4165-0520-2
The Red King (Titan, Book 2)	Michael A. Martin and Andy Mangels	September 27, 2005	0-7434-9628-0
Forged in Fire (Excelsior)	Michael A. Martin and Andy Mangels	December 26, 2007	978-1-4165-4716-7

== See also ==
- List of Star Trek novels
- List of Star Trek: The Next Generation novels
