= Strike Zone (novel) =

1989 novel by Peter David

- Author: Peter David
- Cover artist: Cintron
- Language: English
- Series: Star Trek: The Next Generation #5
- Genre: Science fiction novel
- Publisher: Pocket Books
- Publication place: United States
- English publication date: March 1989
- Pages: 275
- ISBN: 9993612103
- Dewey Decimal: 813.54
- Preceded by: Survivors
- Followed by: Power Hungry

Strike Zone is a Star Trek: The Next Generation novel by Peter David, published by Pocket Books in March 1989. It was the author's first novel set in the Star Trek universe, although he had previously written stories for the DC Comics line of comics. Strike Zone was originally intended to feature the Romulans but this was scrapped, with the new aliens called the Kreel replacing them. It was also meant to feature the crew of the Enterprise from Star Trek: The Original Series but the publishers asked David to use those from The Next Generation instead.

== Plot ==
In this book, a race of aliens who have fought with the Klingons for centuries, called the Kreel, find a large stash of advanced weapons hidden on a strange planet on the Kreel-Klingon border. The Kreel are scavengers and had plundered the destroyed colony that was Worf's childhood home. They declare war on the Klingons, and the crew of the USS Enterprise are asked to help with the peace negotiations.

== Production ==
The story had been suggested by Steve Saffel, his publicist. The idea was for an alien race to threaten the outposts on both sides of the Federation-Romulan Neutral Zone, but author Peter David found out that this idea was used for the closing episode of the TNG first season, "The Neutral Zone". So instead, the Romulans were substituted with the Kreel, a race created by David. David originally wrote the novel to feature the crew of Star Trek: The Original Series, but changed the novel after being asked to re-write it to feature those from Star Trek: The Next Generation by Dave Stern, an editor at Pocket Books. This was because the books for The Original Series were scheduled for the following couple of years, while he promised David that if he wrote one featuring the crew of The Next Generation, then it could be on sale within six months. Because of this, he described it as having "all the elements from both Star Trek programs". He described the changes as a "heavy retooling" so that it "flowed naturally out of Next Generation characters because you can't just take out Kirk and drop in Picard and have the story be precisely the same." He spoke with actress Marina Sirtis in order to get her insight into the character of Deanna Troi, as he wanted to expand on the character's empathic abilities and explain them more than they were on the television series.

Strike Zone featured characters which matched descriptions of those that David had previously included in the stories featured in the Star Trek issues published by DC Comics. He said that Pocket Books didn't see it as sequel to his previous works but they were "edgy" about him including characters such as Bernie the Klingon, who he had redeveloped into a character named Kobry. This admission of the relationship between Bernie and Kobry was later forgotten by the fandom, who instead considered it a rumour. The novel was also the first to feature both Guinan and Katherine Pulaski, who first appeared in the second season.

David also saw the characters of TNG as being too perfect, which he sought to rectify in Strike Zone. These including elements such as describing why Commander William Riker decided to grow a beard between the first and second seasons – which David decided was to irritate Captain Jean-Luc Picard because of his baldness. Additionally, David sought to redeem Wesley Crusher in the eyes of the readers by giving him an impossible scenario. The author said that "I basically throw down a challenge, everyone who thinks Wesley Crusher is an irredeemably bad character is challenged to read the book and come away with that exact same opinion."

This was the first Star Trek book to be written by Peter David, and he joked that it would help him send his kids to college. He went on to write quite a few more books in the Star Trek universe, including the Star Trek: New Frontier series and the well received Imzadi and Q-in-Law novels.

== See also ==
- List of Star Trek: The Next Generation novels
