= Star Trek: Section 31 (novel series) =

Book series

- Cover of Disavowed (2014), by David Mack
- Rogue (2001); Shadow (2001); Cloak (2001); Abyss (2001); Disavowed (2014); Control (2017)
- Author: Various
- Language: English
- Genre: Science fiction
- Publisher: Pocket Books
- Published: 2001–2017
- Media type: Print (Paperback)
- No. of books: 6
- Website: startrekbooks.com

Star Trek: Section 31 is a series of thematically linked novels that explore the operations of the clandestine organization known as Section 31. The series was published by Pocket Books from 2001 to 2017, and initially spanned four Star Trek book lines, including The Next Generation, Deep Space Nine, and Voyager.

In 2014, the series was relaunched with Disavowed, by David Alan Mack. A 2017 sequel, Control, is linked with the Deep Space Nine and The Next Generation relaunch book lines.

== Production ==
Editor Marco Palmieri told Jeff Ayers in Voyages of Imagination (2006), "From the moment the concept was introduced in the Deep Space Nine episode "Inquisition", I knew I wanted to do Section 31 stories." He continued, "The controversy that erupted in fandom over Section 31 didn't surprise me; in fact, it only fueled my desire. Some fans argue that it goes against the fundamental ideology and the basic philosophical assumptions that Star Trek is built upon." Palmieri's desire to develop a series was to "explore the organization's effects upon different crews beyond the [Deep Space Nine] milieu[.]"

According to Palmieri, readers would have to "sometimes read four, six, or more volumes in order to get a complete story." Section 31, in contrast, was conceived as four standalone novels, with no connecting story. The novels are only thematically linked, and have no specific reading order. "The idea was to give the reader the option to read as many or as few of the … novels as he or she wanted, in any order."

=== Rogue (2000) ===
Star Trek: The Next Generation – Rogue was written by Andy Mangels and Michael A. Martin. Martin told Ayers, "Mangels and I worked out our prose collaboration process for the first time with this one. That is, we work out the plot details more or less together until the story makes us happy … Once everyone has signed off on it, Andy and I decide where to put the chapter breaks and agree which of us is to write which chapters. Then we write, trade our chapters, and make editorial suggestions, and struggle to make all the 'joins' between chapters dovetail (think carpentry)."

Martin continued, "One element of the story that caused some controversy was the portrayal of Lieutenant Hawk, who was first seen in the movie First Contact, as being involved in a same-sex relationship." Mangels also said, "A basic tenet of Star Trek is 'Infinite Diversity in Infinite Combinations,' and I found it frustrating and disappointing—not just as an openly gay writer but also as a lifelong fan—that gays and lesbians had almost no representation in the future world of Star Trek. Just as Trek has over the decades been a beacon of hope for millions of minority racial, ethnic, and philosophical groups who have had reason to worry about their future, it seemed only fitting that Trek fans of varying sexual orientations got to share that optimism of a better and more inclusive world." Mangles explained, "Like a lot of Trek authors, Mike and I infuse our projects with characters of different sexual orientations, biologies, religions, politics, and personal lives, in the true spirit of Star Trek."

In a 2010 interview with StarTrek.com, Mangels said Rogue links with his other Star Trek novels.

=== Shadow (2001) ===
Star Trek: Voyager – Shadow was written by Dean Wesley Smith and Kristine Kathryn Rusch. Smith said, "Taking Section 31 into Voyager was a real challenge. I'm not sure how it came about, but I do remember enjoying working with Marco on it."

Palmieri noted the challenge was devising a "plausible Section 31 scenario for Voyager, given its distance from the Federation. We hit upon the idea that an agent had been imbedded on the ship specifically for Voyager's mission to the Badlands, … The twist was establishing that [agent] was already deceased by the time Shadow takes place." The action taken by the agent prior to her demise was only then "wreaking havoc on Voyager."

=== Cloak (2001) ===
Star Trek: Section 31 – Cloak was written by S. D. Perry. Perry told Jeff Ayers, "Marco was talking to me about one of his pet projects and I pretty much begged for the original series. I was lucky again." The novel elaborated on the "historical events" mentioned in the Voyager episode "The Omega Directive". While writing Cloak, Perry said Star Trek fans are a "seriously discriminating, and although I'm not the sharpest neat-tech-stuff writer, I really want to do justice to the characters as emotional, real people, and I hope that translates."

=== Abyss (2001) ===
Star Trek: Deep Space Nine – Abyss was written by David Weddle and Jeffrey Lang. The plot for Abyss was developed by Weddle and Palmieri after the conclusion of Deep Space Nine. Palmieri recalled, “One of the great things about David's involvement in the project was that Abyss was the story that followed up on Avatar," a 2003 duology written by S. D. Perry. Weddle was unable to complete the novel due to television writing commitments. To bring the novel to publication on time, Palmieri approached Jeffery Lang. Lang told Ayers, "The writing and publishing process was pretty straightforward: Marco said, 'Here's the outline; can you have the book back to me on Thursday?' Okay, maybe not that short, but we were working on a tight deadline. Since then, I've learned that we're always working on a tight deadline." Lang was previously contracted to write Immortal Coil, which was put aside on Palmieri's recommendation.

According to Lang, the novel was lightly edited. Palmieri suggested the holo-ship from Insurrection (1998) being included, an example of what Lang called Marco-isms which began with "‘Hey, you know what would be neat?"

=== Disavowed (2014) ===
Star Trek: Section 31 – Disavowed was written by David Mack. Mack said Disavowed would be a "spy-thriller-type-thing." The plot would focus on Julian Bashir finding a new "modus vivendi", insinuating himself into Section 31, with the goal of taking down the organization.

The novel includes characters from Mirror Universe alternate reality. The depiction of the Dominion analogue within the Mirror Universe differs from the Dominion encountered during Deep Space Nine's Dominion War arc. The mirror-Founders pursue their manifesto of bringing order to the galaxy via the "absolute rule of law and justice."

Simon & Schuster published the novel as part of the Deep Space Nine relaunch. Cover artist was Tim Bradstreet.

=== Control (2017) ===
Star Trek: Section 31 – Control was written by David Mack. A direct sequel to Disavowed, Mack explained on his blog that Control would chronicle Bashir's ongoing "shadow war" against Section 31. The titular character is an artificial intelligence deployed by the Federation called Uraei, which has gone rogue. A similar plot is explored in the second season of Star Trek: Discovery. According to Mack, events depicted A Time to Kill (2004) and A Time to Heal (2004) tie directly to the plot of Disavowed and Control.

Mack had requested a blood-red cover to fit the tone of the novel, "which is brutal, tense, violent, and—by the end—genuinely bloody." Mack also said, "It probably won't surprise anyone to learn that I was in a rather angry state of mind when I wrote the outline."

== Reception ==
Michelle Erica Green of TrekToday said of Rogue and Shadow "both do a fine job illustrating the demoralizing dangers of Section 31." However, Shadow failed to offer the substance of Rogue "in terms of both complexity and interest." In an interview with StarTrek.com, Mangels believed Rogue will always be considered one of his and Martin's best works. Ayers noted that Rogue was the single bestselling mass-market Star Trek title of 2001.

After rereading Shadow, Green said she came to understand Section 31's reasoning behind their actions, but that "[t]his doesn't make the organization any less despicable[,] nor any more logical[.]" Green said Cloak does a good job capturing the humor of the original series, though Dr. McCoy is subdued. This is because Cloak is set shortly before "For the World Is Hollow and I Have Touched the Sky", and "he has just discovered that he is dying of a blood disorder, and is frantic to track down a woman he knew at Starfleet Medical who may be able to cure him." Of Abyss and the Section 31 series, they are both "superbly done -- certainly one of Pocket Books' better Trek miniseries." She recommended the books be read in order which events occurred, "Cloak first, then Rogue, then Shadow[,] which isn't terribly substantial, and finally Abyss."

A staff writer at TrekCore said Disavowed is another "incredible tale from David Mack, telling a story that incorporated many of my favorite elements from recent Trek lit: Julian Bashir, the Mirror Universe's Galactic Commonwealth, action, suspense, and superb writing[.]" The novel was then declared to be among the Star Trek novels of 2014. In his review of Disavowed, Patrick Hayes of SciFiPulse said, "Mack could write a novel focusing on a Tribble's life and make it stunning[.]" He went on to say the novel "was an exceptionally exciting, surprising, wonderful trip to the Mirror Universe with Doctor Bashir trying to destroy an organization that won't quit."

Rick Schepis of TrekCore says: "Enjoying Section 31: Control should not be difficult for all readers, those familiar with Star Trek … Mack does write to his audience, rewarding longtime fans of the franchise and current ongoing novels with numerous references—many of which have been impacted by the revelations in this novel." Schepis also notes that the novels's opening scenes "will leave mouths agape at what has occurred and what it means for the future of the characters. Heartbreaking might be the word best to describe Control's epilogue, none no worse than on the story's protagonist." Dénes House of TrekMovie.com criticized the novel for relying "the hoary cliché of the protagonist rushing in to save his beloved, even at the risk of unimaginable devastation to countless others, because he 'can't live without her'."

== Novels ==
The numbered novels were published as part of four book lines: The Next Generation, Voyager, Star Trek, and Deep Space Nine. Cloak (2001) does not include the Original Series subtitle.

No.	Title	Author(s)	Released	ISBN
1	Rogue (The Next Generation)	Andy Mangels and Michael A. Martin	May 22, 2001	0-671-77477-8
2	Shadow (Voyager)	Dean Wesley Smith and Kristine Kathryn Rusch	May 22, 2001	0-671-77478-6
3	Cloak (Star Trek)	S. D. Perry	June 26, 2001	0-671-77471-9
4	Abyss (Deep Space Nine)	David Weddle and Jeffrey Lang	June 26, 2001	0-671-77483-2

== Relaunch novels ==
Disavowed (2014) and Control (2017) are linked with Deep Space Nine and The Next Generation relaunch book lines. Collateral Damage (2019), a Next Generation novel also by David Mack, includes characters from Control.

Title	Author(s)	Released	ISBN
Disavowed	David Mack	October 28, 2014	978-1-4767-5308-9
Control	David Mack	March 28, 2017	978-1-5011-5170-5

== Related novels ==
Below is an incomplete list of novels which include Section 31 characters and settings.

Title	Author(s)	Released	ISBN
A Time to Kill (The Next Generation)	David Mack	July 27, 2004	0-7434-9177-7
A Time to Heal (The Next Generation)	David Mack	August 31, 2004	0-7434-9178-5
Hollow Men (Deep Space Nine)	Una McCormack	April 26, 2005	0-7434-9151-3
Zero Sum Game (Typhon Pact)	David Mack	October 26, 2010	978-1-4391-6079-4
Plagues of Night (Typhon Pact)	David R. George III	May 29, 2012	978-1-4516-4955-0
Raise the Dawn (Typhon Pact)	David R. George III	June 26, 2012	978-1-4516-4956-7
A Ceremony of Losses (The Fall)	David Mack	October 29, 2013	978-1-4767-2224-5
Collateral Damage (The Next Generation)	David Mack	October 8, 2019	978-1-9821-1358-2

== See also ==
- List of Star Trek novels
- List of Star Trek: Deep Space Nine novels
- List of Star Trek: The Next Generation novels
- List of Star Trek: Voyager novels
