= Andy Mangels =

American science fiction writer (born 1966)

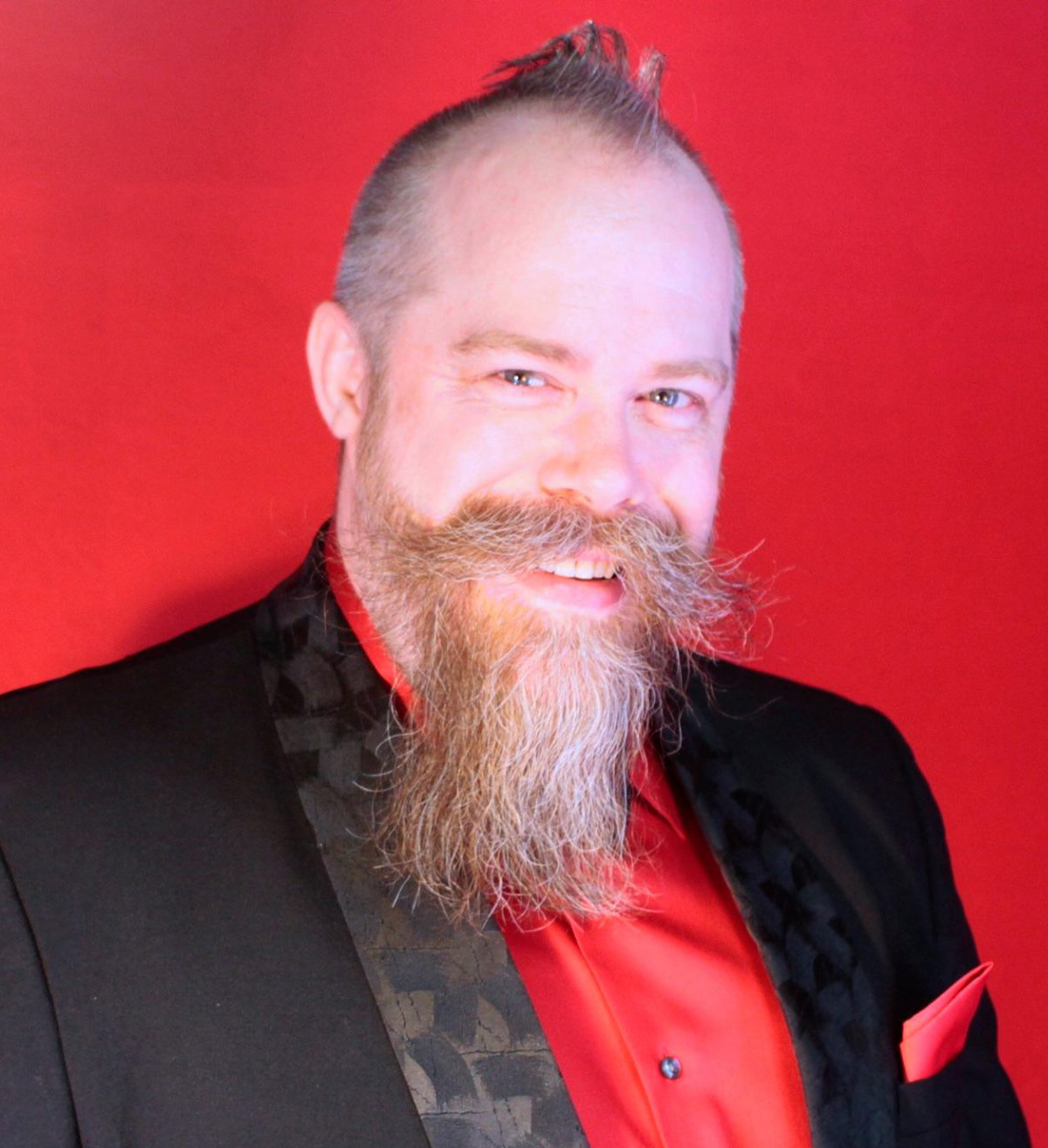
- Mangels in 2016
- Born: December 2, 1966 (age 59); United States
- Writing career
- Genres: science fiction, superheroes, non-fiction
- Notable work: Gay Comix
- Notable awards: Inkpot Award

Andy Mangels (born December 2, 1966) is an American science fiction author who has written novels, comic books, and magazine articles, and produced DVD collections, mostly focusing on media in popular culture. As an openly gay man, he has been a longtime advocate for greater visibility of gay and lesbian characters in various media, especially comics, including the coordination and moderation of the annual "Gays in Comics" panel for San Diego Comic-Con since it was begun in 1988. He is the founder of an annual "Women of Wonder Day" event, which raised over $136,000 in funds for domestic violence shelters and related programs during its seven-year run. As of 2011 he has had three books on the USA Today "best-selling books" list.

== Books ==
Mangels has written a number of references for popular science fiction and pop culture media. These include Star Wars: The Essential Guide to Characters (published by Del Rey in 1995), which appeared on the USA Today "best-selling books" list; Beyond Mulder and Scully: The Mysterious Characters of "The X-Files" (Citadel Press, 1997); Animation on DVD: The Ultimate Guide (Stone Bridge Press, 2003); From Scream To Dawson's Creek: The Phenomenal Career of Kevin Williamson (Renaissance Publishing, 2000); Iron Man: Beneath The Armor (Random House, 2008); and Lou Scheimer: Creating The Filmation Generation (TwoMorrows, 2012). He contributed to The Superhero Book: The Ultimate Encyclopedia of Comic Book Icons and Hollywood Heroes (Visible Ink Press, 2004), and The SuperVillain Book: The Ultimate Encyclopedia of Comic Book and Hollywood Masterminds, Megalomaniacs, and Menaces, (Visible Ink Press, 2006).

Much of Mangels' prose fiction has been related to media franchises begun in television. In collaboration with Michael A. Martin, he wrote a number of Star Trek novels, two of which appeared on the USA Today "best-selling books" list. One of them, Star Trek: Section 31 Rogue, was the first Star Trek property to feature gay lead characters. Mangels and Martin also co-wrote a series of novels serving as the official continuation of Star Trek: Enterprise following the television series' cancellation. These include Last Full Measure, The Good That Men Do, and Kobayashi Maru. They co-created the crew and wrote the first two novels of the Star Trek: Titan series. Together they wrote the conclusion for the events of the cult-hit television series Roswell (which had ended with a cliffhanger) in the novels Pursuit and Turnabout. Mangels and Martin also contributed a story to Tales of Zorro, edited by Richard Dean Starr and published by Moonstone Books in 2008.

== Comic books ==
Since the 1990s Mangels has written comic book stories and text pieces for several major publishers. His work for DC Comics includes writing for Justice League Quarterly, Who's Who in the DC Universe, and Wonder Woman '77. His Marvel Comics work includes issues of Star Trek: Deep Space Nine, Star Trek Unlimited, Mad Dog, Adventures of the X-Men, and Adventures of Spider-Man. For Dark Horse he wrote Boba Fett: Twin Engines of Destruction, and he scripted a story in Wildstorm's Star Trek Special. Comics published by Image include the Bloodwulf mini-series, Badrock & Company, and Troll Halloween Special. For Innovation he scripted several tie-ins to the Child's Play, Nightmare on Elm Street, and Quantum Leap franchises. For WaRP he contributed scripts for Elfquest: Blood of Ten Chiefs. His Topps writing includes the comics adaptation of Jason Goes To Hell: The Final Friday. He scripted Platinum Studio' graphic novel Super Larry, World's Toughest Man. For Microsoft he wrote the world's first interactive online comic series, RE-Man.

Mangels served as editor of the anthology Gay Comix from 1991 to 1998, for issues #14–25 (plus one "special"). He also contributed stories, including creating an early openly gay superhero named Pride. Under his editorship, the series changed its name to "Gay Comics" (symbolically becoming a part of the mainstream instead of underground comix scene), published multiple issues per year, raised page and cover payment rates and instituted a reprint fee, enforced a gender-parity of 50% male and 50% female creators rule, and even occasionally brought in popular heterosexual creators to bump sales, such as George Pérez and Sam Kieth. A story that Mangels' commissioned for Gay Comics #19 from Alison Bechdel would later be expanded upon for Bechdel's Fun Home graphic novel, for which Bechdel thanked him during her keynote speech at the 2016 "Queers and Comics" symposium at City University of New York.

Mangels has written non-fiction articles and reviews – often about the intersection of comics and Hollywood – for magazines such as Amazing Heroes, Alter Ego/FCA, Anime Invasion, Cinescape, Comics Buyer's Guide, Comics Interview, Comics Scene, Overstreet's FAN Magazine, Hero Illustrated, Marvel Age, Marvel Vision, Sci-Fi Invasion, Sci-Fi Universe, SFX, Sketch, Starlog, Star Wars Galaxy Magazine, Star Wars Galaxy Collector, Toons, Wild Cartoon Kingdom, Wizard, and others. He has written for international magazines such as Dreamwatch (UK), Edizione Star (Italy), Fantazia (UK), Farscape Magazine (UK), La Tomba Di Dracula (Italy), Star Trek Monthly (UK), Star Wars Magazine (UK), and others. He writes regularly for TwoMorrows' magazine Back Issue!.

In 2012, Mangels was awarded the Inkpot Award for Achievement in the Comic Arts at San Diego Comic-Con. Mangels has presented panels at Comic-Con since 1988.

In July 2016, The New York Times ran a story about Dynamite Entertainment, which revealed that Mangels was writing a new intercompany crossover mini-series for the company, in conjunction with DC Comics: Wonder Woman '77 Meets The Bionic Woman, bringing together the Lynda Carter television character with Lindsay Wagner's fellow 1970s television super-heroine. The series was set to start in Fall 2016.

== DVD features ==
His DVD special features production work has primarily been collecting and restoring earlier children's television programs, and serving as host for the representations.

Mangels scripted and directed 16 half-hour documentaries for the various He-Man and the Masters of the Universe releases from BCI Eclipse/ Ink & Paint. He also provided Special Features content, including hosting commentary tracks, and other production work and writing for the sets. From 2006 to 2008, Mangels also directed and scripted documentaries and commentary tracks and providing Special Features content for almost forty BCI Eclipse/ Ink & Paint releases, including for She-Ra: Princess of Power, The Legend of Prince Valiant, Flash Gordon, Blackstar, Space Sentinels, Freedom Force, Groovie Goolies, A Snow White Christmas, Journey Back To OZ, Defenders of the Earth, Ghost Busters – The Animated Series, Ark II, Dungeons & Dragons, Mission: Magic!, Space Academy, The Secret Lives of Waldo Kitty, Fraidy Cat, The New Adventures of Zorro, The Lone Ranger, The Legend of Bravestarr, Snow White: Happily Ever After, Jason of Star Command, Hero High, Ghost Busters (live action), Fabulous Funnies, and The Secrets of Isis

When BCI Eclipse closed in 2008, Mangels worked for two other companies, scripting and directing documentaries, and providing commentary tracks and production work. For Genius Products, he produced The Archie Show and Archie's Funhouse. For Time Life, he produced a boxed set for The Real Ghostbusters.

Mangels' work as a DVD producer won him significant critical acclaim. In addition to being a guest at DVD panels at San Diego Comic-Con, his work on The Best of He-Man and the Masters of the Universe won a "Best 1980s Series" from Home Media Retailing at their 2005 TVDVD Awards. The Digital Bits website noted in their 2006 Bitsy Awards that with "the hiring of DVD producer Andy Mangels to create extras, things turned around big time in 2006. BCI/Eclipse is now leading the pack with their top-notch releases of nostalgic Saturday morning TV favorites from the 70s and 80s, each one stuffed to the max with fantastic bonuses".

In addition to the above, Mangels has contributed liner notes and materials to multiple Anchor Bay DVDs – including Beastmaster, Highlander, Elvira: Mistress of the Dark, Plenty, Sleuth and Can't Stop the Music – and has aided Paramount and Warner Bros. with various DVD sets.

== Performance ==
Mangels performed onstage in Kalispell, Montana theatres, including roles in such shows as Brigadoon, A Christmas Carol, Once Upon a Mattress and Ira Levine's psycho-thriller Veronica's Room. He has also performed in Portland, Oregon with Stumptown Stages in The Great American Trailer Park Christmas Musical, JANE Theatre in Hullabaloo: The Little Frankenstein, Coho Theatre in Mrs California and Steel Magnolias, and on the Lakewood Theatre stage in The Secret Garden. Additionally, he has performed in fundraising events since the early 1990s in Portland.

In mid-2011, Mangels and fellow Portland performer Mark Brown founded the Broadway Bears singing group, as a way to address the inequality bearded and larger actors faced when being cast for roles. Advertising themselves as "Portland's Furriest Singers," the group of gay performers represented the bear subculture in cabaret concert performances, singing live songs from throughout the musical realm of stage and screen, representing male and female songs that ranged from comedy to pathos, and performing solos, duets, trios, and group numbers. The Broadway Bears has performed six long-form multi-night concert sets through summer 2016, as well as performing at local events, including the famous Peacock in the Park events.

As a screen actor, Mangels has had bit parts or extra roles in television series such as Leverage, The Librarians, and Grimm. He has appeared multiple times on Grimm, most recently in a two-episode arc in 2015 as a featured member of the "Wesenrein" group. He has also been in several films and telefilms, including Untraceable, Comic Book: The Movie, A Change of Heart, and Total Reality.

As a pop culture expert, he has been featured in numerous documentaries, including shows for PBS, E!, Warner Bros. and others. These include Wonder Women! The Untold Story of American Superheroines, FANatical, E! True Hollywood Story, and documentaries for the Wonder Woman, Batman: The Animated Series, Batman, All-New Super Friends Hour, Wonder Woman, DC Super Heroes: The Filmation Adventures, Batman: Gotham Knight, and Never Sleep Again: The Elm Street Legacy.

== Activism ==
Mangels is active in the gay community, particularly in the leather and bear subcultures. He previously held the title of Mr. Oregon State Leather 2004. He has won multiple national Pantheon of Leather awards, specifically the "Northwest Regional Award" in 1995, 2005, and 2011.

He created, moderated, and ran the "Gays In Comics" panel at San Diego Comic-Con for 25 years, from 1988 to 2012. He is a founding member of the non-profit GLBTQI organization PRISM Comics, serving gay comic fans and professionals, and is a member of the group's advisory board.

As an ordained minister with the Universal Life Church, Mangels performed the Unity Wedding at Denver Comic Con in June 2016. The wedding featured ten couples – straight, gay, lesbian, and transgender – married in front of a large crowd.

In 2019, Mangels was the subject of state-wide and national attention when he and his husband were forced to find a new home following a 113% increase in their rent. The publicity surrounding this led to the passage of rent-control legislation in the state of Oregon, and Mangels was invited to attend the bill signing by Gov. Kate Brown.

== Leather History ==
Andy Mangels was Mr. Oregon State Leather 2004 a gay leather and kink title bestowed upon him by Blackout Leather Productions (DBA Oregon State Leather Contest), His title wife Theresa (Darklady) Reed has gone on to run Catalyst: A Sex Positive Place, a Sex Dungeon in Oregon which has since closed under allegations of misconduct.

== Private life ==
Mangels works as a home care worker for the State of Oregon, for elderly and disabled clients. He resides in Portland, Oregon, with his longtime partner and now husband, Donald Hood, and their dog Lucy.

== Bibliography ==
Solo books

- Star Wars: The Essential Guide To Characters (November 1995) Non-fiction. A USA Today best-seller
- Beyond Mulder and Scully: The Mysterious Characters of The X-Files (February 1998). Actor interviews.
- From Scream To Dawson's Creek: The Phenomenal Career of Kevin Williamson (February 2000). Biography of Kevin Williamson.
- Animation on DVD: The Ultimate Guide (March 2003). 600-page guidebook to animated DVDs.
- The Superhero Book: The Ultimate Encyclopedia of Comic Book Icons and Hollywood Heroes (November 2004). Encyclopedia with 50 entries by Mangels.
- The SuperVillain Book: The Ultimate Encyclopedia of Comic Book and Hollywood Masterminds, Megalomaniacs, and Menaces (August 2006). Encyclopedia with entries by Mangels.
- Iron Man: Beneath The Armor (April 2008). Non-fiction.
- Lou Scheimer: Creating The Filmation Generation (October 2012). Autobiography, written with Lou Scheimer.
- The X-Files: Secret Agendas (September 2016). Mangels wrote a short story for this prose anthology. Based on The X-Files television series.

Star Trek novels and stories co-written with Michael A. Martin

- Rogue (June 2001). Part of the Star Trek: Section 31 series.
- Cathedral (October 2002). Third book of the Mission Gamma sub-series. Part of the wider Star Trek: Deep Space Nine relaunch.
- Ishtar Rising, Book 1 (August 2003). Part of the Starfleet Corps of Engineers series.
- The Sundered (August 2003). Part of the Star Trek: The Lost Era series. Featuring Hikaru Sulu.
- Ishtar Rising, Book 2 (September 2003). Part of the Starfleet Corps of Engineers series.
- Star Trek: Deep Space Nine – Prophecy and Change (September 2003). This anthology featured a story co-written by Mangels and Martin. Part of the wider Star Trek: Deep Space Nine relaunch.
- Star Trek: Tales of the Dominion War (July 2004). This anthology featured a story co-written by Mangels and Martin. Part of the wider Star Trek: Deep Space Nine relaunch.
- Worlds of Deep Space Nine, Book II — Trill (February 2005). Part of the wider Star Trek: Deep Space Nine relaunch.
- Taking Wing (April 2005). Part of the Star Trek: Titan series.
- Star Trek: Tales from the Captain's Table (July 2005). This anthology featured a story co-written by Mangels and Martin.
- The Red King (September 2005). Part of the Star Trek: Titan series.
- Last Full Measure (May 2006). Based on the Star Trek: Enterprise television series.
- Star Trek: Starfleet Corps of Engineers Book 8 — Aftermath (November 2006). Part of the Starfleet Corps of Engineers series. Collects the "Ishtar Rising" ebooks.
- The Good That Men Do (March 2007). Based on the Star Trek: Enterprise television series. Featuring a secret history of character Trip Tucker.
- Excelsior: Forged in Fire (December 2007). Featuring Hikaru Sulu.
- Kobayashi Maru (2008). Based on the Star Trek: Enterprise television series.

Other book work co-written with Michael A. Martin

- Roswell: Skeletons in the Closet (November 2002). Based on the Roswell television series.
- Roswell: Pursuit (September 2003). Based on the Roswell television series.
- Roswell: Turnabout (November 2003). The conclusion of the Roswell television series.
- Tales of Zorro (September 2008). Mangels and Martin co-wrote a short story for this prose anthology.
