= Star Trek: Titan =

Book series

- Taking Wing (2005) by Michael A. Martin and Andy Mangels
- Author: Various
- Country: United States
- Language: English
- Genre: Science fiction
- Publisher: Pocket Books
- Published: 2005–2017
- Media type: Print (Paperback); Digital (eBook)
- No. of books: 10

Star Trek: Titan is a series of science fiction novels set within the Star Trek media franchise, which detail the adventures of the USS Titan under the command Captain William T. Riker, who was part of the main cast the 1987-1994 TV series Star Trek: The Next Generation and its spinoff films. The series was published by Simon & Schuster imprints Pocket Books, Pocket Star, and Gallery Books from 2005 to 2017. The novels are set after the events depicted in the 2002 film Star Trek: Nemesis.

Other cast members from Next Generation and other Trek TV series include Riker's wife, Counselor Deanna Troi, who served with Riker aboard the USS Enterprise under the command of Jean-Luc Picard; and Alyssa Ogawa who was a ship's nurse on the Enterprise; and Commander Tuvok, who was a cast member on Star Trek: Voyager.

== Concept ==
In the beginning of the 2002 feature film Star Trek Nemesis, Commander William Riker, who has served as First Officer under Captain Jean-Luc Picard for fifteen years aboard two different starships named Enterprise, marries his longtime on-again, off-again love, ship's counselor, Commander Deanna Troi. By the end of the film, Riker has been promoted to Captain, and he and Troi transfer to the USS Titan, Riker's first permanent command. According to the Titan series book description at Amazon.com, the series take place in what is regarded as a new era, following a decade of conflict between the Federation and enemies such as the Borg, the Cardassians, the Klingons, and the Dominion. Starfleet is renewing its mission of peaceful exploration and diplomacy, a mission spearheaded by the Titan, which in addition to Riker and Troi, is crewed by "the most biologically varied and culturally diverse crew in Starfleet history." Their first mission, in the debut novel, Taking Wing, is to set up power-sharing talks among the various Romulan factions that, in the wake of Praetor Shinzon's death in Nemesis, threaten to plunge the Romulan Empire into civil war.

== Characters ==
- Captain William T. Riker is a human male, who served as the Federation flagships Enterprise-D's and Enterprise-E’s executive officer under Captain Jean-Luc Picard, beginning in 2364. As the vessel's first officer, Riker was offered his own command numerous times, but repeatedly turned them down in favor of remaining aboard the Enterprise, admitting to Picard in Star Trek Generations that he had always hoped he would take command of the Galaxy class starship. Following the destruction of the Enterprise-D, Riker transferred to its successor, the Enterprise-E, with Picard, and continued to serve as first officer until 2379, helping to defend Earth against the Borg, prevent the illegal relocation of the Ba'ku and destroy the Reman warbird Scimitar. Shortly before the Scimitar's destruction, Riker married his off-and-on lover, Deanna Troi, who thereafter transferred to the Titan with him to serve as the vessel's counsellor and chief diplomatic officer.
- Commander Christine Vale is a human female and executive officer of the starship Titan. Vale previously served as the Enterprise-E's chief tactical officer. Coming from a long line of peace officers on Izar, Commander Vale's family was gravely disappointed in her choice to join Starfleet.
- Commander Deanna Troi is a half-Human, half-Betazoid female. The wife of Captain Riker, Troi serves as the vessel's chief diplomatic officer as well as ship's counselor, a position she previously held on both the Enterprises D and E under Captain Picard, to whom she often served as an advisor. Speaking during Riker and Troi's wedding, Picard noted that Troi had been his "guide and [his] conscience" in her years on the Enterprises. Despite being only half Betazoid, Troi is a capable empath and has been shown to communicate telepathically with other Betazoids, specifically her mother, Lwaxana Troi. According to the non-canon novel, Imzadi, Troi joined Starfleet following a romantic relationship with Will Riker. (This is alluded to in "Encounter at Farpoint".)
- Commander Tuvok is a Vulcan male. Tuvok shares the cold and logical nature associated with his people. His first Starfleet assignment was aboard the USS Excelsior under Captain Hikaru Sulu, most famously during the events of Star Trek VI: The Undiscovered Country. During his service Tuvok became disenchanted with non-Vulcans and resigned from Starfleet, only to join again decades later, where he eventually settled aboard the USS Voyager under Captain Kathryn Janeway. In 2371, Tuvok was on an undercover mission infiltrating the Maquis when he became trapped in the Delta Quadrant. He was later re-united with Voyager and served as the vessel's head of security until its return home. Following his return, Tuvok worked for Starfleet Intelligence within Romulan space at the time of the Shinzon uprising, and was later rescued from imprisonment by the Titan crew, which he joined when their previous tactical & chief security officer became comatose as a result of battle, afterwards Tuvok agreed to stay on permanently as chief tactical officer. After Titan was briefly lost in the Small Magellanic Cloud, Tuvok's wife, T'Pel, came to live aboard the ship.
- Lieutenant Alyssa Ogawa is a human female. Like Riker and Troi, Alyssa Ogawa served for a number of years on both the Enterprises, having begun her Starfleet service aboard the Enterprise-D as an ensign and nurse under Dr. Beverly Crusher in 2367. At the recommendation of Crusher, she was promoted to Lieutenant junior grade in 2370 and became a senior sickbay staff member as Head Nurse. She would report to the command staff of the vessel in Crusher's absence. She also married Lt. Andrew Powell in the same year, and the two had a son. Powell was killed during the Battle of Rigel during the Dominion War, and though Ogawa did transfer to the Enterprise-E, she readily took the opportunity to leave the vessel with her son and serve within the Titan's sickbay.
- Dr. Shenti Yisec Eres Ree is a Pahkwa-thanh male. The chief medical officer of the starship Titan, Dr. Ree's friendly bedside manner is juxtaposed by his fearsome appearance. Standing over two meters tall, this bi-pedal reptile reminds Captain Will Riker of one of Earth's extinct, pack hunting dinosaurs like members of the genus Deinonychus, with Riker once describing Ree as a "overgrown Velociraptor with a medical degree".
- Lieutenant Commander Ranul Keru is an unjoined Trill male. The chief of security and tactical officer, Commander Keru was rendered comatose from injuries sustained during a battle between Romulan and Reman forces. Captain Riker subsequently offered the post to Tuvok until Commander Keru's recovery. Upon his awakening, Keru opted to remain security chief, leaving Tuvok as tactical officer. Keru had served previously on the Enterprise-E where he was romantically involved with the Star Trek: First Contact character Lieutenant Hawk.
- Lieutenant Commander Jaza Najem is a Bajoran male. He serves as chief science officer. Originally serving in the Bajoran Militia, he entered Starfleet when Bajor joined the Federation in 2376. He was briefly romantically involved with first officer Christine Vale. Jaza left the Titan when he stranded himself in the distant past of Orisha in order to get the rest of the crew back to their proper time period.
- Commander Xin Ra-Havreii is an Efrosian male. He worked at Utopia Planitia as a head designer of the Luna-class, holding a doctorate in warp field mechanics and a reserve rank of commander. Traveling with the crew on Titan's first mission, he took over as chief engineer after Lieutenant Commander Nilani Ledrah's death.
- Lieutenant Commander Melora Pazlar is an Elaysian female. She is head of stellar cartography and succeeds Jaza Najem as chief science officer. Pazlar originally appeared on an episode of Star Trek: Deep Space Nine, she was an ensign and had just graduated from Starfleet Academy with honors in stellar cartography. Her first assignment was to survey and chart some of the newly discovered systems in the Gamma Quadrant, as her species came from a low gravity planet she has difficulty moving in Earth-normal gravity and has to wear a special exoskeleton to help her walk. Dr. Julian Bashir worked closely with Pazlar to help accommodate her special needs, even having her quarters modified to have easily adjustable gravity, the two developed a short-lived romantic relationship. Prior to serving on the Titan Pazlar was stationed a lieutenant on the Enterprise-E in 2376, she was assigned as the senior science officer on a team studying a newly discovered planet that had unusually low-gravity which the Enterprise was sent to investigate.
- Lieutenant Sariel Rager is a human female. She is senior operations officer and transferred from the Enterprise-E with Captain Riker.
- Lieutenant j.g. Aili Lavena is a Selkie female. She is senior flight controller.
- Ensign Torvig Bu-Kar-Nguv is a Choblik male. He had a long-distance graduation from Starfleet Academy aboard Titan and stayed on as an engineer.

== Flagship ==
The USS Titan (NCC-80102), a Luna-class starship, was designed by Sean Tourangeau in 2005, who entered his concept into a "design the Starship Titan" contest hosted by Simon & Schuster. Tourangeau's design was never seen on-screen in any Star Trek film or television series, only recreated on various book covers, therefore it was not canon. In 2020, a variant of Tourangeau's Titan design was featured in an episode of Star Trek: Lower Decks.

In Decipher, Inc.'s Star Trek Customizable Card Game, the Titan is identified as a Prometheus-class starship. However, the Luna class is available in Star Trek Online, as one of three designs used for the "Tier-5 Reconnaissance Science Vessel".

== Novels ==
Not all novels are numbered by Simon & Schuster. Absent Enemies (2014), by John Jackson Miller, was published as an ebook exclusive.

No.	Title	Author(s)	Date	ISBN
1	Taking Wing	Michael A. Martin and Andy Mangels	March 29, 2005	0-7434-9627-2
2	The Red King	Michael A. Martin and Andy Mangels	September 27, 2005	0-7434-9628-0
3	Orion's Hounds	Christopher L. Bennett	December 27, 2005	1-4165-0950-X
4	Sword of Damocles	Geoffrey Thorne	November 27, 2007	978-1-4165-2694-0
5	Over a Torrent Sea	Christopher L. Bennett	February 24, 2009	978-1-4165-9497-0
6	Synthesis	James Swallow	October 27, 2009	978-1-4391-0914-4
—	Fallen Gods	Michael A. Martin	July 31, 2012	978-1-4516-6062-3
—	Absent Enemies ◊	John Jackson Miller	February 24, 2014	978-1-4767-6299-9
—	Sight Unseen	James Swallow	September 29, 2015	978-1-4767-8316-1
—	Fortune of War	David Mack	November 28, 2017	978-1-5011-5200-9

=== Related novels ===
Titan characters and settings appear in the following novels and short stories:

Title	Author(s)	Date	ISBN
Tales from the Captain's Table (anthology)	Keith DeCandido, ed.	June 14, 2005	1-4165-0520-2
Gods of Night (Destiny, Book 1)	David Mack	September 30, 2008	978-1-4165-5171-3
Mere Mortals (Destiny, Book 2)	David Mack	October 28, 2008	978-1-4165-5172-0
Lost Souls (Destiny, Book 3)	David Mack	November 25, 2008	978-1-4165-5175-1
Shards and Shadows (anthology) (Mirror Universe)	Marco Palmieri and Margaret Clark, eds.	January 6, 2009	978-1-4165-5850-7
Seize the Fire (Typhon Pact, Book 2)	Michael A. Martin	November 30, 2010	978-1-4391-6782-3
Watching the Clock (Department of Temporal Investigations)	Christopher L. Bennett	April 26, 2011	978-1-4516-0625-6
The Poisoned Chalice (The Fall, Book 4)	James Swallow	November 26, 2013	978-1-4767-2222-1
Dark Veil (Picard, Book 2)	James Swallow	January 2021	978-1-9821-5406-6

== See also ==
- List of Star Trek novels
- List of Star Trek: The Next Generation novels
- List of Star Trek: Voyager novels
