= The Adventures of a Two-Minute Werewolf =

- Genre: Animation; Adventure; Comedy
- Based on: The Adventures of a Two-Minute Werewolf by Gene DeWeese
- Written by: Pamela Pettler
- Directed by: Mark Cullingham
- Starring: Knowl Johnson; Julia Reardon; Melba Moore; Lainie Kazan
- Music by: Rupert Holmes
- Country of origin: United States
- Original language: English

Production
- Executive producer: Jane Startz
- Producer: Howard Meltzer
- Cinematography: Arthur Albert
- Editor: Gloria Whittemore
- Running time: 41 minutes
- Production company: Scholastic Productions

Original release
- Network: ABC
- Release: February 23 – March 2, 1985

The Adventures of a Two-Minute Werewolf, also called The Adventures of a 2-Minute Werewolf is a 1985 television film produced by ABC television as part of its ABC Weekend Special series. It is based on the young adult novel of the same name by Gene DeWeese.

The special was aired in two parts.

== Plot ==
Adolescent werewolf Walt Cribbens finds himself transforming into a wolf-boy form for two minutes at a time. He has no idea why he is a werewolf, so he decides to seek answers with the help of his best friend Cindy, who witnessed his very first transformation. This quest is complicated by a series of local robberies that throw suspicion on Walt.
