= The Peacekeepers =

1988 Star Trek: The Next Generation novel by Gene DeWeese

- Author: Gene DeWeese
- Language: English
- Series: Star Trek: The Next Generation
- Genre: Science fiction
- Publisher: Pocket Books
- Publication date: September 1, 1988
- Publication place: United States
- Media type: Print (Paperback)
- Pages: 310 pp
- ISBN: 0-671-66929-X
- OCLC: 18465374
- Preceded by: Ghost Ship
- Followed by: The Children of Hamlin

The Peacekeepers is a 1988 Star Trek: The Next Generation novel by Gene DeWeese. It is set at an undetermined point during the series' first season.

The novel takes place in the 24th century of the Star Trek science fiction universe, based on the then new television's shows' characters.

== Plot ==
While investigating an alien derelict, Geordi La Forge and Data are sent to a solar system several light-years away by a transporter with interstellar range, to a similar derelict orbiting an Earth-like planet. Once there, they are mistaken for "the Builders", those who the planet's native populace, a culture similar to late-20th-century Earth, believe are the creators of the derelict, which they call the "Repository of the Gifts". One of the natives, Shar-Lon, discovered the Repository some years before and used its "Gifts" (advanced technology) to end planetary wars that were leading to a possible nuclear holocaust. However, Shar-Lon's use of the Gifts since that time has led to a worldwide perception of himself and his supporters, the Peacekeepers, as a suppressive force that has limited the social and technological advancement of their people. Assuming the role of "Builders" in order to assess their situation, La Forge and Data are drawn into the social politics of the Peacekeepers and their world, and must extract themselves from the situation and find a way back to the Enterprise without further harming the natives' culture and violating the Prime Directive.

== Background ==
Star Trek: The Next Generation was a television show inspired by science fiction show Star Trek that aired in the late 1960s; the new show with new characters became the highest rated show in syndication at that time, and won a Peabody award, after it debuted in the fall of 1987.

== See also ==
- List of Star Trek: The Next Generation novels
