= Immortal Coil =

Book by Jeffrey Lang, from 2002

Immortal Coil is a Star Trek: The Next Generation novel written by Jeffrey Lang, published by Pocket Books in February 2002. The novel centres on the character Data investigating an incident at Starfleet. The novel takes place in the 24th century in the Star Trek Universe.

== Plot ==
When a newly developed android developed by Starfleet is destroyed, Lieutenant Commander Data helps investigate the incident and who is responsible. During the course of his search he discovers he is not as unique as he once believed.

== See also ==
- List of Star Trek: The Next Generation novels
- List of Star Trek novels
