= Hikaru Sulu =

Fictional character from Star Trek

- Star Trek character
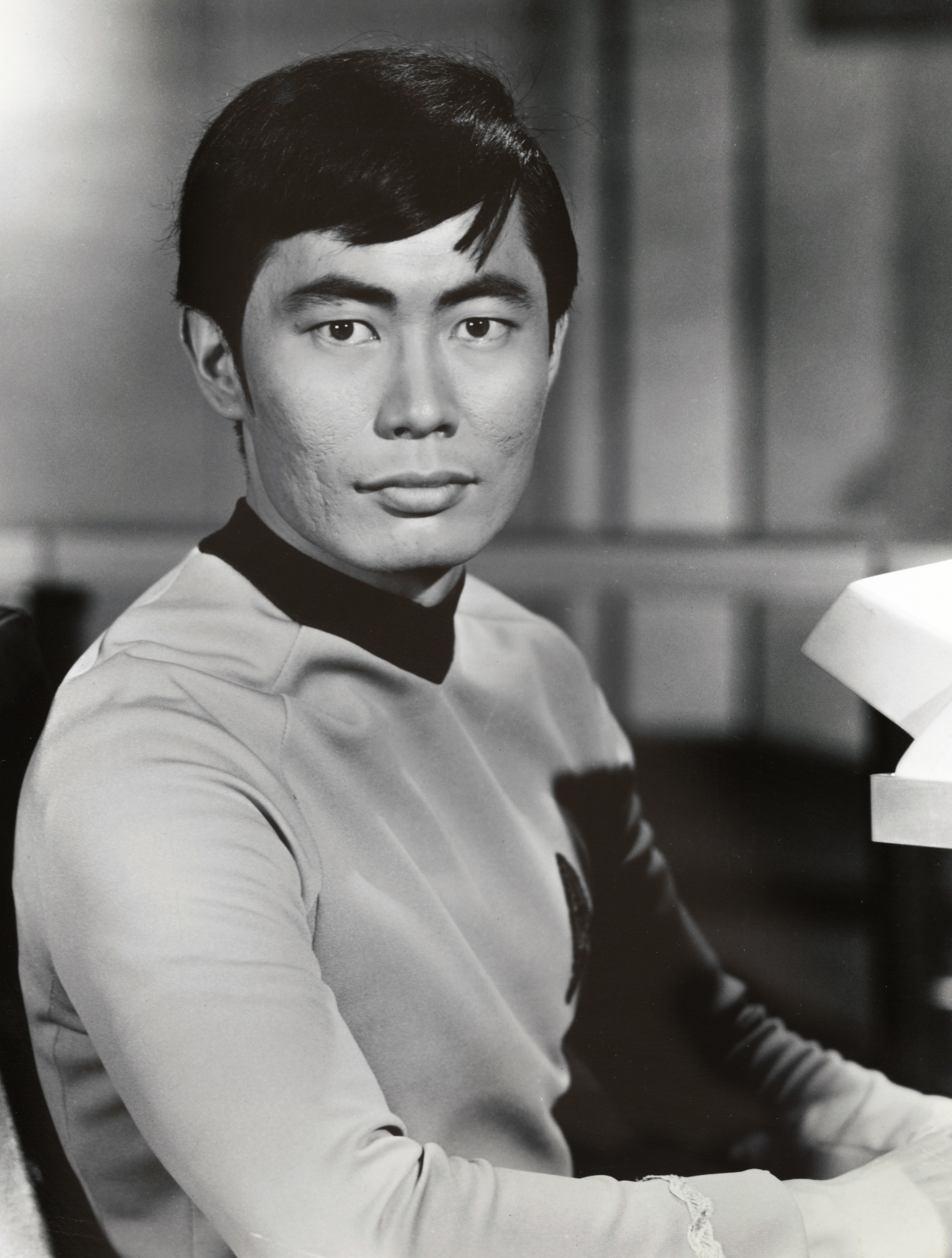
- George Takei as Lieutenant Hikaru Sulu, from Star Trek (1966).
- First appearance: "The Man Trap"; Star Trek; September 6, 1966
- Created by: Gene Roddenberry
- Portrayed by: George Takei (1966–1996); John Cho (2009–2016)
- Voiced by: George Takei (2022)

In-universe information
- Full name: Hikaru Kato Sulu
- Species: Human
- Gender: Male
- Position: USS Enterprise helmsman; USS Enterprise-A helmsman; USS Excelsior commanding officer
- Affiliation: United Federation of Planets; Starfleet
- Children: Demora Sulu
- Origin: San Francisco, California, Earth (present-day United States)

Hikaru Sulu is a fictional character in the Star Trek media franchise. A member of the crew in the original Star Trek series, Sulu also appears in the animated Star Trek series, in the first six Star Trek movies, in one episode of Star Trek: Voyager, and in several books, comics, and video games. Originally known simply as "Sulu", his first name, "Hikaru", appeared in a 1981 novel well over a decade after the original series had ended.

Sulu was portrayed by George Takei in the original Star Trek series. John Cho took over the role of the character in the 2009 film Star Trek and its sequels, Star Trek Into Darkness and Star Trek Beyond. In 2025, it was reported that Kai Murakami will portray the character in a guest appearance for the 2027 series finale episode of Star Trek: Strange New Worlds.

== Development and portrayals ==
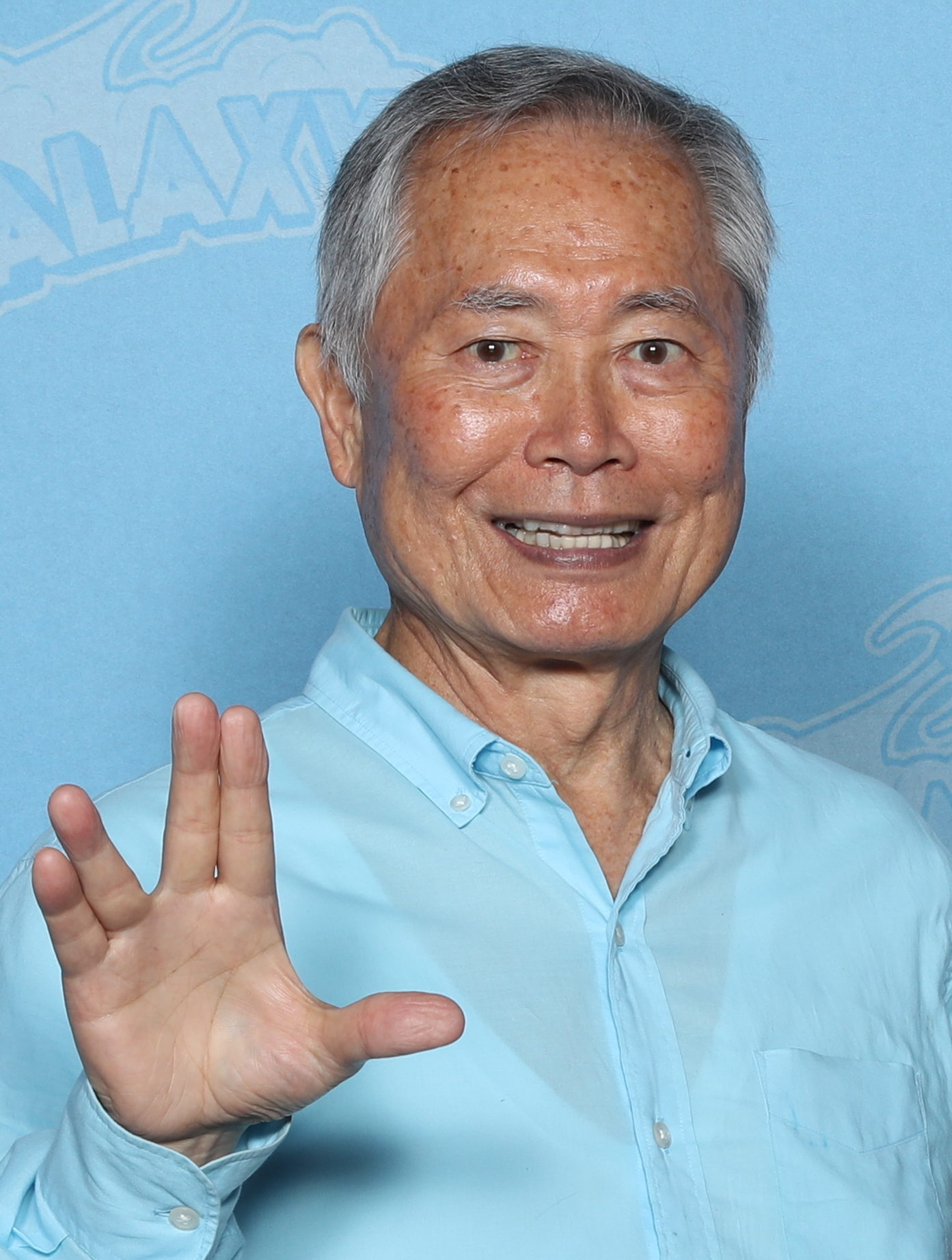
Sulu was portrayed by George Takei in Star Trek: The Original Series and the first six films.

George Takei recalled Gene Roddenberry wanted the character to represent all of Asia, which symbolized the peace of the Trek universe in spite of the numerous wars in the continent. Roddenberry did not want a nationally specific surname, so he looked at a map and saw the Sulu Sea in central Philippines. "He thought, 'Ah, the waters of that sea touch all shores'," the actor recalled, "and that's how my character came to have the name Sulu."

In the book Inside Star Trek: The Real Story, the character's name is noted as a pun on the name of vice president of Desilu Studios, Herb Solow.

Novelist Vonda McIntyre first presented "Hikaru" as the character's first name in the novel The Entropy Effect. McIntyre derived the character's first name from The Tale of Genji. Although McIntyre was unaware at the time of any controversy surrounding her giving Sulu a first name, editor David Hartwell had to clear the name with Gene Roddenberry and Takei in order to assuage Paramount's objections. However, the name did not become canon until its mention in Star Trek VI. Peter David has written about making the suggestion to director Nicholas Meyer at the urging of Takei during a visit to the set.

In some Japanese dubs, Commander Sulu's family name is changed to Katō. According to Daniel Bernardi, Sulu, being a Filipino noun and not a Japanese surname, would likely be unpronounceable by Japanese speakers as the language has no "l" sound distinguished from "r". Katrina Ojaste attributes this to a lack of effort at cultural accuracy by the writers at the time in portraying a veritable Japanese character. However, in recent movies, it is only slightly changed; the name スールー (Sūrū, with long vowels) is used, rather than スル (Suru, with short vowels). Although the latter would be a closer transliteration of the name "Sulu", it might sound odd to Japanese audiences because "Suru" (する) with short vowels is the verb "to do" in the Japanese language.

== Depiction ==
=== Original series and films ===
Hikaru Sulu was born in San Francisco, and is of Japanese heritage. His birthdate has not been established definitively, but the book Star Trek Chronology by Michael Okuda and Denise Okuda speculates that he was 29 at the time of the first season of Star Trek (as was the actor himself), putting his birth in the year 2237. He was shown as the USS Enterprise's staff physicist in the pilot episode, "Where No Man Has Gone Before" (1966).

An early Paramount press release described this initial conception of his character as follows: "Physicist Sulu is the trim, soft-spoken chief of the Enterprise's Astro Science Department. Frequently it is his assessment of the conditions on unexplored planets that finally determines when and how they will be approached, or if they can be explored at all." However, throughout the rest of the series, he served as third officer and senior helmsman, holding the rank of lieutenant. Throughout the series, Sulu is shown having many interests and hobbies, including gymnastics, botany, fencing, and ancient weaponry. In the episode "The Naked Time" (1966), Spock observes that Sulu "is at heart a swashbuckler out of the 18th century".

The character is promoted to lieutenant commander some time before Star Trek: The Motion Picture, and to full commander by the time of Star Trek II: The Wrath of Khan. During the first five Star Trek movies, he serves as helmsman aboard both the USS Enterprise and USS Enterprise-A. He is promoted to captain and given command of the USS Excelsior three years before the events of Star Trek VI: The Undiscovered Country.

Star Trek Generations introduces Hikaru's daughter, Demora Sulu, whose origins are also depicted in Peter David's canon novel The Captain's Daughter.

=== Reboot films ===
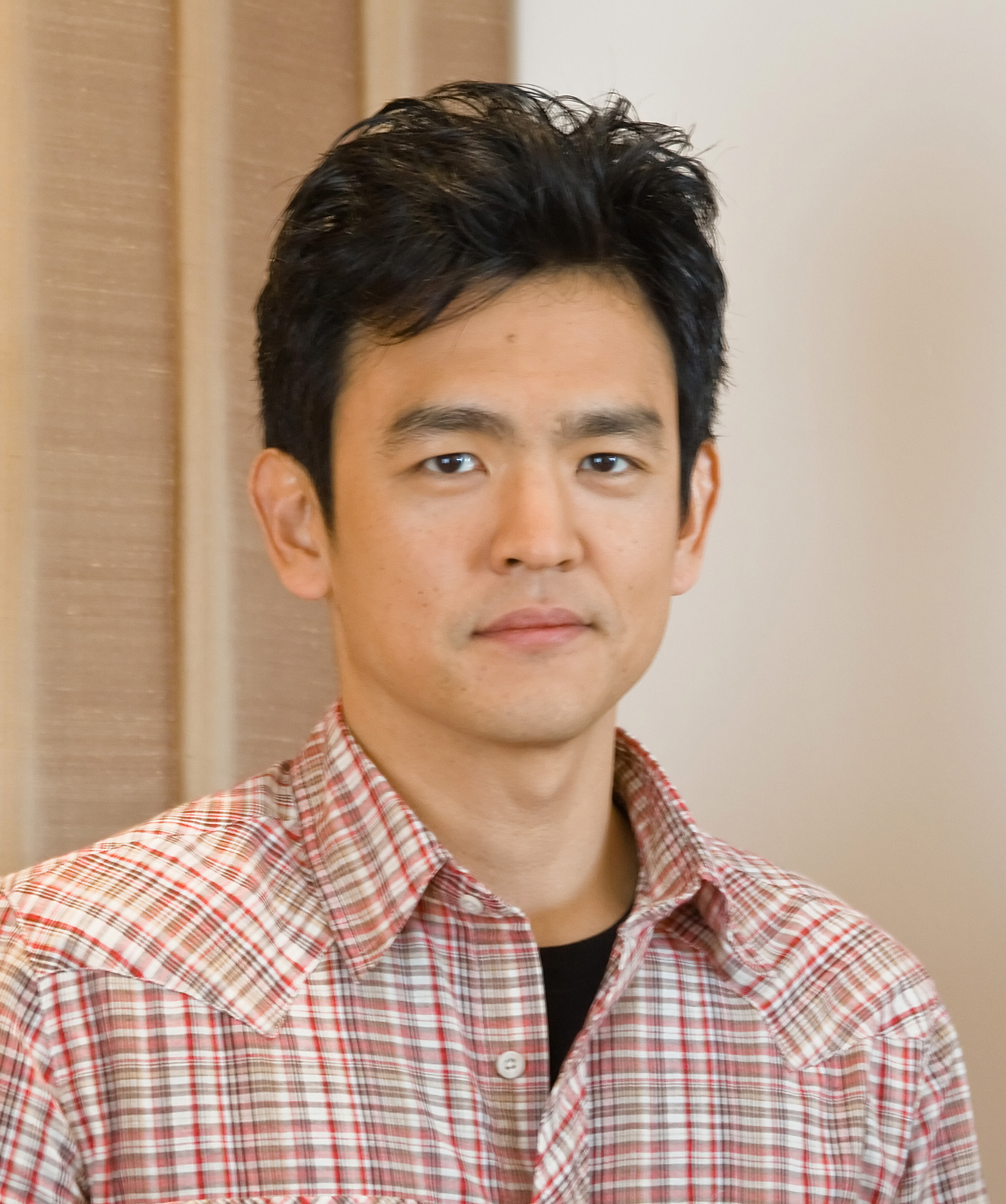
John Cho plays Sulu in the Star Trek films in the "Kelvin timeline".

John Cho portrays an alternative Sulu in the 2009 film Star Trek. J. J. Abrams was concerned about casting a Korean-American as the character, but Takei explained to the director that Sulu was meant to represent all of Asia on the Enterprise, so Abrams went ahead with Cho. Cho acknowledged that being an Asian-American, "There are certain acting roles that you are never going to get, and one of them is playing a cowboy. Playing Sulu is a realization of that dream—going into space." He cited the masculinity of the character as being important to him, and spent two weeks fight training. Cho suffered an injury to his wrist during filming, although a representative noted it was "no big deal". James Kyson Lee was interested in the part, but because Zachary Quinto was cast as Spock, the producers of the TV show Heroes did not want to lose another cast member for three months.

Cho portrays a younger Sulu in the 2009 film, though he is actually older than Takei was when he portrayed the role in the original series; Cho was 36 while Takei was 29. Cho also portrays Sulu in the 2013 sequel Star Trek Into Darkness, taking up the role of acting captain on the USS Enterprise when both Kirk and Spock were absent. At the film's climax Sulu admits to Kirk that he wouldn't mind being a captain, referencing his role as captain of the USS Excelsior in the original film series.

In the third film, Star Trek Beyond, Sulu is portrayed as a gay man with a husband and daughter. Writer Simon Pegg and director Justin Lin made the decision as a nod to original actor George Takei, who had become a prominent LGBT rights activist since portraying the character in the original series. Takei disliked the idea, and attempted to persuade the filmmakers to create a new gay character rather than revealing Sulu as closeted, saying, "Unfortunately, it's a twisting of Gene's creation, to which he put in so much thought." Pegg replied that he felt it was unfortunate that "the most inclusive, tolerant universe in science fiction" had never featured an LGBT character, but that revealing an existing character as gay avoided creating the impression of tokenism. Pegg also said that Sulu had never been closeted, but that his sexuality had simply never come up, and suggested that Roddenberry would have explored LGBT themes in the original series if he had had the opportunity.

=== Guest appearances ===
Takei reprised the role of Sulu, as part of Star Trek's 30th anniversary, in the Star Trek: Voyager episode "Flashback" aired in 1996. In the episode, Captain Sulu appears in Tuvok's flashbacks of his time serving aboard the USS Excelsior, during events depicted in Star Trek VI. Sulu is also responsible for another future USS Voyager crew member (Chakotay) joining Starfleet.

In 2025, it was reported that Kai Murakami will portray Sulu in a guest appearance for the 2027 series finale episode of Star Trek: Strange New Worlds, as that series ends its five-season run by moving closer to the timing – and crew – of the original series.

The non-canon fan production Star Trek: New Voyages episode "World Enough and Time" starred Takei as Captain Sulu on the Excelsior recalling a time on the original Enterprise when a transporter accident caused him to come back thirty years older and with a daughter, Alana. Demora also appears in this episode, as well as Hikaru's granddaughter (named Alana in his daughter's honour).

Grant Imahara portrayed Hikaru Sulu in all 11 episodes of the fan film web series Star Trek Continues.

=== Other media ===
The Lost Era novel The Sundered depicts a USS Excelsior mission under Sulu's command.

The novel Forged in Fire depicts an earlier USS Excelsior mission prior to Sulu's assuming command of the ship.

The novelization of Star Trek IV: The Voyage Home includes an encounter in 1986 San Francisco intended to be included in the final film but ultimately cut between Sulu and a young Japanese-American boy who asks, "What are you doing here, Uncle Hikaru?" After conversing with the boy and learning his name, Sulu realizes that the boy is his great-great-grandfather. In another part of the novel as he borrows a helicopter to deliver the whale tank materials, it is revealed that Sulu is part Filipino, as he converses about the Philippine People Power Revolution which had just occurred earlier in 1986.

Simon & Schuster Audioworks released three non-canon Captain Sulu Adventures, featuring voice acting by Takei and various others, in the mid-1990s: Transformations, Cacophany, and Envoy.

The reference book Federation: The First 150 Years, by David A. Goodman, contains an audio introduction by Admiral Hikaru Sulu, indicating that at some point Sulu is promoted to admiral, although this is non-canonical.

In the William Shatner Star Trek novels, it is revealed that Sulu is elected to an unprecedented three terms as President of the United Federation of Planets.

In the TV show Scrubs, Turk wants to be married by a priest who looks like Sulu. The priest is actually played by Takei.

Takei reprised the role of Captain Sulu in the PC game Starfleet Command 2, released in December 2000. The introduction video features Takei, as Captain Sulu on board the USS Excelsior, describing the outbreak of an interstellar war between several galactic powers as part of his Captain's Log. Later updates to the game also included several bonus voice-scripted missions, that again featured Takei as Sulu.

In scientific illustrator Jenny Parks' 2017 book Star Trek Cats, Sulu is depicted as a Japanese Bobtail.

== Reception ==
Robert Justman, co-producer of the original Star Trek series, noted that Takei had previously played bad guys, but through Star Trek had become one of the first Asian actors to portray an Asian character in a positive light. Justman described him as "the antithesis of the so-called expressionless-unemotional-inscrutable Asian."
