= Star Trek: Typhon Pact =

Novel series

- Zero Sum Game (2010); Seize the Fire (2010); Rough Beasts of Empire (2010); Paths of Disharmony (2011); The Struggle Within (2011); Plagues of Night (2012); Raise the Dawn (2012); Brinksmanship (2012)
- Author: Various
- Country: United States
- Language: English
- Genre: Science fiction
- Publisher: Pocket Books
- Published: 2010–2012
- Media type: Print (Paperback); Digital (eBook)
- No. of books: 8
- Preceded by: Star Trek: Destiny
- Followed by: Star Trek: The Fall

Star Trek: Typhon Pact is a series of eight novels set in the universe of the American science fiction franchise Star Trek. It features a series of crossovers between several different series of novels, including The Next Generation, Deep Space Nine and Titan. The Typhon Pact itself has been compared to the Warsaw Pact as a Cold War situation begins in the Star Trek Universe, and one of the books in the series has been described as an allegory for the Arab Spring.

== Production ==
The Typhon Pact concept was created by editor Marco Palmieri, and first introduced in Keith DeCandido's novel A Singular Destiny.

The covers of the novels in the series were redesigned prior to their German language release in June 2013.

== Plot summary ==
The Typhon Pact Series follows the events of the Destiny (2008) trilogy by David Mack, along with the stand-alone novel A Singular Destiny (2009) by Keith DeCandido, and features crossovers between several series of Star Trek novels. The plot describes the formation of the "Typhon Pact"—an alliance of several alien civilizations against the Federation following the defeat of the Borg in 2381, an event which resulted in approximately 63 billion deaths and the destruction of roughly 40% of Starfleet. These races include the Romulans, Breen, Tholians, Gorn, Tzenkethi, and the Kinshaya.

In response to these developments, the United Federation of Planets, Klingon Empire, Cardassian Union, and Ferengi Alliance form a new collective security organization, similar to NATO, later referred to as the Khitomer Accords Alliance. With the two power blocs now opposed to one another, a cold war descends upon the galaxy as events and incidents described in the novels illustrate the actions taken on both sides of the conflict. Characters from the Star Trek Universe are seen conducting secret actions ranging from intelligence gathering, to covert operations and sabotage, with a particular focus on the Pact's efforts to acquire the quantum slipstream drive. These escalate to the level that Deep Space Nine is destroyed as part of an attempt by the Pact to access the Bajoran wormhole as part of a plan to access Dominion technology to develop a quantum slipstream drive, but ultimately the Pact abandon their efforts to steal the drive, concluding that their own efforts have caused more damage to peace than if they had done nothing.

While the first few books of the series act as stand alone novels, the final three act as a trilogy entitled The Khitomer Accords Saga. The novels feature the Enterprise-E under Captain Jean-Luc Picard, the Titan under Captain William T. Riker and the Aventine under Captain Ezri Dax.

== Reception ==
Empire magazine considered the Typhon Pact to be the franchise's version of the Warsaw Pact, with the Federation playing the part of NATO. They also described it as "extraordinary" that no one had considered the storyline previously.

Other elements of the miniseries have been compared to real world events, with the plot of The Struggle Within compared to the Egyptian Revolution of 2011 by the website WhatCulture!, and the Arab Spring in general.

== Novels ==
Typhon Pact is a continuation of the Destiny (2008) miniseries. Many storylines conclude in The Fall (2013–14). The Struggle Within (2011) was released as an ebook exclusive. The Khitomer Accords Saga (2013), also an ebook exclusive, collected the concluding trilogy.

No.	Title	Author	Released	ISBN
1	Zero Sum Game	David Mack	October 26, 2010	978-1-4391-6079-4
2	Seize the Fire	Michael A. Martin	November 30, 2010	978-1-4391-6782-3
3	Rough Beasts of Empire	David R. George III	December 28, 2010	978-1-4391-6081-7
4	Paths of Disharmony	Dayton Ward	January 25, 2011	978-1-4391-6083-1
5	The Struggle Within ◊	Christopher L. Bennett	October 4, 2011	978-1-4516-5142-3
6	Plagues of Night	David R. George III	May 29, 2012	978-1-4516-4955-0
7	Raise the Dawn	David R. George III	June 26, 2012	978-1-4516-4956-7
8	Brinkmanship	Una McCormack	September 25, 2012	978-1-4516-8782-8
	The Khitomer Accords Saga ◊ (omnibus, Book 6–8)	David R. George III and Una McCormack	January 22, 2013	978-1-4767-3334-0

== See also ==
- List of Star Trek novels
- List of Star Trek: Deep Space Nine novels
- List of Star Trek: The Next Generation novels
