= List of Star Trek: The Next Generation novels =

This is a list of Star Trek: The Next Generation novels based on the American science fiction television series of the same name. The book line is published by Simon & Schuster's imprints Pocket Books, Pocket Star, Atria, and Gallery.

More recent The Next Generation novels tie-in to other Star Trek book lines and series, such as: Titan (2005–2017), Destiny (2008), Typhon Pact (2010–2012), and The Fall (2013–14).

Key:
All novels published as paperback editions, except where indicated.
†	Hardcover first edition.
^	Children's or young adult book.
◊	Published as an ebook exclusive.
‡	Included in omnibus or collection.
#	Published as a numbered novel.
Navy	Miniseries name.
Pink	Crossover series name.
ed.	Omnibus or collection editor(s).
et al.	Multiple authors, see note.

== Novelizations ==
=== Episode novelizations ===
Based on select episodes from the television series.

Title	Author(s)	Date	ISBN
Encounter at Farpoint	David Gerrold	September 1987	0-671-65241-9
Unification	Jeri Taylor	December 1991	0-671-77056-X
Relics	Michael Jan Friedman	November 1992	0-671-86476-9
Descent	Diane Carey	October 1993	0-671-88267-8
All Good Things... †	Michael Jan Friedman	June 1994	0-671-71898-3

=== Film novelizations ===
Based on The Next Generation film series.

Title †	Author	Date	ISBN
Generations	J. M. Dillard	December 1994	0-671-51742-2
First Contact	J. M. Dillard	December 1996	0-671-00316-X
Insurrection	J. M. Dillard	December 1998	0-671-02447-7
Nemesis	J. M. Dillard	December 10, 2002	0-7434-5772-2

=== Young adult film novelizations ===
Film novelizations intended for younger readers.

Title ^	Author	Date	ISBN
Generations	John Vornholt	December 1994	0-671-51901-8
First Contact	John Vornholt	December 1996	0-671-00128-0
Insurrection	John Vornholt	December 1998	0-671-02107-9
Nemesis	John Vornholt	December 10, 2002	0-689-85627-X (Note: The U.K. variant of Nemesis (2002), by John Vornholt, was assigned ISBN 0-7434-6159-2. It is identical to North American printing.)

== Numbered novels ==
Numbered paperback releases:

No.	Title	Author(s)	Date	ISBN
1	Ghost Ship	Diane Carey	July 1988	0-671-66579-0
2	The Peacekeepers	Gene DeWeese	September 1988	0-671-66929-X
3	The Children of Hamlin	Carmen Carter	November 1988	0-671-67319-X
4	Survivors	Jean Lorrah	January 1989	0-671-67438-2
5	Strike Zone	Peter David	March 1989	0-671-67940-6
6	Power Hungry	Howard Weinstein	May 1989	0-671-67714-4
7	Masks	John Vornholt	July 1989	0-671-67980-5
8	The Captains' Honor	David Dvorkin and Daniel Dvorkin	September 1989	0-671-68487-6
9	A Call to Darkness	Michael Jan Friedman	November 1989	0-671-68708-5
10	A Rock and a Hard Place	Peter David	January 1990	0-671-69364-6
11	Gulliver's Fugitives	Keith Sharee	May 1990	0-671-70130-4
12	Doomsday World	Carmen Carter, Peter David, Michael Jan Friedman, and Robert Greenberger	July 1990	0-671-70237-8
13	The Eyes of the Beholders	A. C. Crispin	September 1990	0-671-70010-3
14	Exiles	Howard Weinstein	November 1990	0-671-70560-1
15	Fortune's Light	Michael Jan Friedman	January 1991	0-671-70836-8
16	Contamination	John Vornholt	March 1991	0-671-70561-X
17	Boogeymen	Mel Gilden	July 1991	0-671-70970-4
18	Q-in-Law	Peter David	October 1991	0-671-73389-3
19	Perchance to Dream	Howard Weinstein	December 1991	0-671-70837-6
20	Spartacus	T. L. Mancour	February 1992	0-671-76051-3
21	Chains of Command	Bill McCay and Eloise Flood	April 1992	0-671-74264-7
22	Imbalance	V. E. Mitchell	June 1992	0-671-77571-5
23	War Drums	John Vornholt	October 1992	0-671-79236-9
24	Nightshade	Laurell K. Hamilton	December 1992	0-671-79566-X
25	Grounded	David Bischoff	March 1993	0-671-79747-6
26	The Romulan Prize	Simon Hawke	May 1993	0-671-79746-8
27	Guises of the Mind	Rebecca Neason	September 1993	0-671-79831-6
28	Here There Be Dragons	John Peel	December 1993	0-671-86571-4
29	Sins of Commission	Susan Wright	April 1994	0-671-79704-2
30	Debtors' Planet	W. R. Thompson	May 1994	0-671-88341-0
31	Foreign Foes	Dave Galanter and Greg Brodeur	August 1994	0-671-88414-X
32	Requiem	Michael Jan Friedman and Kevin Ryan	October 1994	0-671-79567-8
33	Balance of Power	Dafydd ab Hugh	January 1995	0-671-52003-2
34	Blaze of Glory	Simon Hawke	March 1995	0-671-88045-4
35	The Romulan Stratagem	Robert Greenberger	May 1995	0-671-87997-9
36	Into the Nebula	Gene DeWeese	July 1995	0-671-89453-6
37	The Last Stand	Brad Ferguson	October 1995	0-671-50105-4
38	Dragon's Honor	Kij Johnson and Greg Cox	January 1996	0-671-50107-0
39	Rogue Saucer	John Vornholt	March 1996	0-671-54917-0
40	Possession	J. M. Dillard and Kathleen O'Malley	May 1996	0-671-86485-8
41	The Soldiers of Fear ‡ (Invasion!, Book 2)	Dean Wesley Smith and Kristine Kathryn Rusch	July 1996	0-671-54174-9
42	Infiltrator	W. R. Thompson	September 1996	0-671-56831-0
43	A Fury Scorned	Pamela Sargent and George Zebrowski	November 1996	0-671-52703-7
44	The Death of Princes	John Peel	January 1997	0-671-56808-6
45	Intellivore	Diane Duane	April 1997	0-671-56832-9
46	To Storm Heaven	Esther Friesner	December 1997	0-671-56838-8
47	Q-Space ‡ (The Q Continuum, Book 1)	Greg Cox	August 1998	0-671-01915-5
48	Q-Zone ‡ (The Q Continuum, Book 2)	Greg Cox	August 1998	0-671-01921-X
49	Q-Strike ‡ (The Q Continuum, Book 3)	Greg Cox	September 1998	0-671-01922-8
50	Dyson Sphere	Charles Pellegrino and George Zebrowski	April 1999	0-671-54173-0
51	Infection ‡ (Double Helix, Book 1)	John Gregory Betancourt	June 1999	0-671-03255-0
52	Vectors ‡ (Double Helix, Book 2)	Dean Wesley Smith and Kristine Kathryn Rusch	June 1999	0-671-03256-9
53	Red Sector ‡ (Double Helix, Book 3)	Diane Carey	July 1999	0-671-03257-7
54	Quarantine (Note: Similarly named novels: Quarantine (1999), a The Next Generation novel by John Vornholt; Quarantine (1997), a Voyager young adult novel by Patricia Barnes-Svarney.) ‡ (Double Helix, Book 4)	John Vornholt	July 1999	0-671-03477-4
55	Double or Nothing ‡ (Double Helix, Book 5)	Peter David	August 1999	0-671-03478-2
56	The First Virtue ‡ (Double Helix, Book 6)	Michael Jan Friedman and Christie Golden	August 1999	0-671-03258-5
57	The Forgotten War	William R. Forstchen	September 1999	0-671-01159-6
58	Gemworld, Book 1	John Vornholt	February 2000	0-671-04270-X
59	Gemworld, Book 2	John Vornholt	February 2000	0-671-04271-8
60	Tooth and Claw	Doranna Durgin	January 30, 2001	0-671-04211-4
61	Diplomatic Implausibility	Keith DeCandido	January 30, 2001	0-671-78554-0
62	Dead Zone (Maximum Warp, Book 1)	Dave Galanter and Greg Brodeur	February 27, 2001	0-671-04749-3
63	Forever Dark (Maximum Warp, Book 2)	Dave Galanter and Greg Brodeur	February 27, 2001	0-671-04757-4

== Original novels ==
Includes hardcover and paperback releases:

Title	Author(s)	Date	ISBN
Metamorphosis	Jean Lorrah	March 1990	0-671-68402-7
Vendetta	Peter David	May 1991	0-671-74145-4
Reunion †‡	Michael Jan Friedman	November 1991	0-671-74808-4
Imzadi †‡	Peter David	August 1992	0-671-79197-4
The Devil's Heart †	Carmen Carter	April 1993	0-671-79325-X
Dark Mirror †	Diane Duane	December 1993	0-671-79377-2
Q-Squared †	Peter David	July 1994	0-671-89152-9
Crossover †	Michael Jan Friedman	November 1995	0-671-89677-6
Kahless †	Michael Jan Friedman	July 1996	0-671-54779-8
Ancient Blood ‡ (Day of Honor, Book 1)	Diane Carey	September 1997	0-671-00238-4
Ship of the Line (Note: Similarly named works: Ship of the Line (1997), a novel by Diane Carey; Ships of the Line (2006), a fictional reference by Michael Okuda.) †	Diane Carey	October 1997	0-671-00924-9
The Best and the Brightest (Note: Cataloged as part of the Starfleet Academy meta-series by Memory Alpha and Internet Speculative Fiction Database.)	Susan Wright	February 1998	0-671-01549-4
Planet X (Note: Planet X (1998), by Michael Jan Friedman, is a franchise crossover novel of Marvel's X-Men and The Next Generation.) (X-Men)	Michael Jan Friedman (Note: Dujonian's Hoard (1998), as by Jean Luc Picard, told in his own words, as recorded by Michael Jan Friedman.)	May 1998	0-671-01916-3
Dujonian's Hoard ‡ (The Captain's Table, Book 2)	Michael Jan Friedman	June 1998	0-671-01465-X
Behind Enemy Lines (The Dominion War, Book 1)	John Vornholt	November 1998	0-671-02499-X
Tunnel Through the Stars (The Dominion War, Book 3)	John Vornholt	December 1998	0-671-02500-7
Triangle: Imzadi II †‡	Peter David	December 1998	0-671-02532-5
I, Q †	John de Lancie and Peter David	September 1999	0-671-02443-4
The Valiant †‡	Michael Jan Friedman	April 2000	0-671-77522-7
Rogue (Section 31, Book 1)	Andy Mangels and Michael A. Martin	May 22, 2001	0-671-77477-8
Doors into Chaos (Gateways, Book 3)	Robert Greenberger	August 28, 2001	0-7434-1856-5
Immortal Coil	Jeffrey Lang	January 29, 2002	0-7434-0592-7
A Hard Rain	Dean Wesley Smith	February 26, 2002	0-7434-1926-X
The Battle of Betazed	Charlotte Douglas and Susan Kearney	April 2, 2002	0-7434-3434-X
Do Comets Dream?	S. P. Somtow	June 6, 2003	0-7434-6500-8
Shadows Have Offended (Note: Novel exists within the continuity of the television series.)	Cassandra Rose Clarke	July 13, 2021	978-1-9821-5404-2

== Young adult novels ==
Star Trek: The Next Generation – Starfleet Academy young adult series explores the lives of the USS Enterprise crew as Starfleet Academy cadets. The Best and the Brightest (1998), by Susan Wright, is thematically similar. Starfleet Academy (1997), a video game novelization by Diane Carey, is unrelated. Novellas written by Peter David tie into New Frontier (1997–2015).

No.	Title ^	Author(s)	Date	ISBN
1	Worf's First Adventure	Peter David	August 1993	0-671-87084-X
2	Line of Fire	Peter David	October 1993	0-671-87085-8
3	Survival	Peter David	December 1993	0-671-87086-6
4	Capture the Flag	John Vornholt	June 1994	0-671-87998-7
5	Atlantis Station	V. E. Mitchell	August 1994	0-671-88449-2
6	Mystery of the Missing Crew	Michael Jan Friedman	February 1995	0-671-50108-9
7	Secret of the Lizard People	Michael Jan Friedman	April 1995	0-671-50109-7
8	Starfall	Brad and Barbara Strickland	October 1995	0-671-51010-X
9	Nova Command	Brad and Barbara Strickland	December 1995	0-671-51009-6
10	Loyalties	Patricia Barnes-Svarney	April 1996	0-671-55280-5
11	Crossfire	John Vornholt	December 1996	0-671-55305-4
12	Breakaway	Bobbi J.G. Weiss and David Cody Weiss	April 1997	0-671-00226-0
13	The Haunted Starship	Brad Ferguson	December 1997	0-671-01432-3
14	Deceptions	Bobbi J.G. Weiss and David Cody Weiss	April 1998	0-671-01723-3

== Omnibus editions ==
Collections of novels from The Next Generation book line.

Title	Author(s)	Date	ISBN
Invasion!	John J. Ordover, ed. (Note: Invasion! (1998) by John J. Ordover, editor, with Diane Carey, Dean Wesley Smith, Kristine Kathryn Rusch, L.A. Graf, and Dafydd ab Hugh.)	June 1998	0-671-02185-0
Day of Honor	Diane Carey, et al. (Note: Day of Honor (1999) by Diane Carey, L.A. Graf, Michael Jan Friedman, Dean Wesley Smith and Kristine Kathryn Rusch, and Diane G. Gallagher.)	March 1999	0-671-02813-8
The Captain's Table	L. A. Graf, et al. (Note: The Captain's Table (2000) by L.A. Graf, Michael Jan Friedman, Dean Wesley Smith and Kristine Kathryn Rusch, Diane Carey, Peter David, Jerry Oltion.)	March 2000	0-671-04052-9
Double Helix	John Gregory Betancourt, et al. (Note: Double Helix (2002) by John Gregory Betancourt, Dean Wesley Smith and Kristine Kathryn Rusch, Diane Carey, John Vorhnolt, Peter David, and Michael Jan Friedman and Christie Golden.)	October 8, 2002	0-7434-1272-9
Pantheon	Michael Jan Friedman	September 16, 2003	0-7434-8511-4
The Q Continuum	Greg Cox	October 7, 2003	0-7434-8508-4
Imzadi Forever	Peter David	December 2, 2003	0-7434-8510-6
The Hand of Kahless	John M. Ford and Michael Jan Friedman	November 16, 2004	0-7434-9659-0

== Miniseries ==
=== Q Continuum (1998) ===
Star Trek: The Next Generation – The Q Continuum miniseries explores the life of Q prior to his introduction in the episode "Encounter at Farpoint". Published as part of the numbered novel series, books 47 to 49. An omnibus edition was published in 2003 as part of the Signature Edition series.

No.	Title #	Author	Date	ISBN
1	Q-Space	Greg Cox	August 1998	0-671-01915-5
2	Q-Zone	Greg Cox	August 1998	0-671-01921-X
3	Q-Strike	Greg Cox	September 1998	0-671-01922-8

=== Double Helix (1999) ===
Star Trek: The Next Generation – Double Helix crossover miniseries was inspired by the film Outbreak (1995). Created by John J. Ordover and Michael Jan Friedman. Published as part of the numbered novel series, books 51 to 56. An omnibus edition was published in 2002.

No.	Title #‡	Author(s)	Date	ISBN
1	Infection	John Gregory Betancourt	June 1999	0-671-03255-0
2	Vectors	Dean Wesley Smith and Kristine Kathryn Rusch	June 1999	0-671-03256-9
3	Red Sector	Diane Carey	July 1999	0-671-03257-7
4	Quarantine	John Vornholt	July 1999	0-671-03477-4
5	Double or Nothing	Peter David	August 1999	0-671-03478-2
6	The First Virtue	Michael Jan Friedman and Christie Golden	August 1999	0-671-03258-5

=== Genesis Wave (2000–2003) ===
Star Trek: The Next Generation – The Genesis Wave miniseries follows the crew of the Enterprise as they attempt to prevent the weaponization of the Genesis Device.

Title †	Author	Date	ISBN
The Genesis Wave, Book One	John Vornholt	August 29, 2000	0-7434-1180-3
The Genesis Wave, Book Two	John Vornholt	April 3, 2001	0-7434-1181-1
The Genesis Wave, Book Three	John Vornholt	January 2, 2002	0-7434-4375-6
Genesis Force	John Vornholt	June 18, 2003	0-7434-6503-2

=== Maximum Warp (2001) ===
Star Trek: The Next Generation – Maximum Warp miniseries follows the crew of the Enterprise as they search for a solution to a disruption in subspace which prevents warp travel. The titles do not appear on the cover art, only the series name and book number. Published as part of the numbered novel series, books 62 to 63.

No.	Title #	Author(s)	Date	ISBN
1	Dead Zone	Dave Galanter and Greg Brodeur	February 27, 2001	0-671-04749-3
2	Forever Dark	Dave Galanter and Greg Brodeur	February 27, 2001	0-671-04757-4

=== A Time to... (2004) ===
Star Trek: A Time to... crossover miniseries explores events prior to Nemesis (2002). Conceived by John J. Ordover, and edited by Keith DeCandido. Originally intended to be a sequence of twelve novels. Not all printings include a number stamp.

No.	Title	Author(s)	Date	ISBN
1	A Time to Be Born	John Vornholt	January 27, 2004	0-7434-6765-5
2	A Time to Die	John Vornholt	February 24, 2004	0-7434-6766-3
3	A Time to Sow	Dayton Ward and Kevin Dilmore	March 30, 2004	0-7434-8299-9
4	A Time to Harvest	Dayton Ward and Kevin Dilmore	April 27, 2004	0-7434-8298-0
5	A Time to Love	Robert Greenberger	May 25, 2004	0-7434-6285-8
6	A Time to Hate	Robert Greenberger	June 29, 2004	0-7434-6289-0
7	A Time to Kill	David Mack	July 27, 2004	0-7434-9177-7
8	A Time to Heal	David Mack	August 31, 2004	0-7434-9178-5
9	A Time for War, a Time for Peace	Keith DeCandido	September 28, 2004	0-7434-9179-3

=== Slings and Arrows (2007–08) ===
Star Trek: The Next Generation – Slings and Arrows miniseries explores events between Generations (1994) and First Contact (1996). Published as ebook exclusives.

No.	Title ◊	Author(s)	Date (Note: Exact date of release is not known, or not available via primary sources. Approximated to the nearest month.)	ISBN
1	A Sea of Troubles	J. Steven York and Christina F. York	October 1, 2007	978-1-4165-5008-2
2	The Oppressor's Wrong	Phaedra M. Weldon	November 7, 2007	978-1-4165-5013-6
3	The Insolence of Office	William Leisner	December 1, 2007	978-1-4165-5022-8
4	That Sleep of Death	Terri Osborne	January 14, 2008	978-1-4165-5024-2
5	A Weary Life	Robert Greenberger	February 1, 2008	978-1-4165-5026-6
6	Enterprises of Great Pitch and Moment	Keith DeCandido	March 11, 2008	978-1-4165-5027-3

=== Cold Equations (2012) ===
Star Trek: The Next Generation – Cold Equations relaunch miniseries explores the effect artificial life has on Starfleet and the Federation.

No.	Title	Author	Date	ISBN
1	The Persistence of Memory	David Mack	October 30, 2012	978-1-4516-5072-3
2	Silent Weapons	David Mack	November 27, 2012	978-1-4516-5073-0
3	The Body Electric	David Mack	December 26, 2012	978-1-4516-5074-7

== Anthologies ==
Anthologies of short fiction featuring characters and settings from The Next Generation.

Title	Editor(s)	Date	ISBN
Adventures in Time and Space (excerpt collection)	Mary P. Taylor	August 1999	0-671-03415-4
Enterprise Logs (Note: Similarly named works: The Enterprise Logs (1976–77), a four-volume omnibus collection of Star Trek comics originally published by Gold Key; Enterprise Logs (2001), a collection of selected excerpts from Star Trek tie-in fiction and related works edited by Carol Greenburg.) (excerpt collection)	Carol Greenburg	June 2000	0-671-03579-7
What Lay Beyond † (Gateways, Book 7)	John J. Ordover (Note: What Lay Beyond (2001) by John J. Ordover, editor, with Diane Carey, Peter David, Keith DeCandido, Christie Golden, Robert Greenberger, and Susan Wright.)	October 30, 2001	0-7434-3112-X
The Amazing Stories	John J. Ordover	August 20, 2002	0-7434-4915-0
Tales of the Dominion War	Keith DeCandido	August 3, 2004	0-7434-9171-8
Tales from the Captain's Table	Keith DeCandido	June 14, 2005	1-4165-0520-2
The Sky's the Limit	Marco Palmieri	October 16, 2007	978-0-7434-9255-3
Seven Deadly Sins	Margaret Clark	March 16, 2010	978-1-4391-0944-1

== Relaunch novels ==
Interlinked novels set after the film Nemesis (2002):

Title	Author(s)	Date	ISBN
Death in Winter †	Michael Jan Friedman	September 20, 2005	0-7434-9721-X
The Buried Age	Christopher L. Bennett	June 26, 2007	978-1-4165-3739-7
Resistance	J. M. Dillard	August 28, 2007	978-0-7434-9955-2
Q & A	Keith DeCandido	September 25, 2007	978-1-4165-2741-1
Before Dishonor	Peter David	October 30, 2007	978-1-4165-2742-8
Greater than the Sum	Christopher L. Bennett	July 29, 2008	978-1-4165-7132-2
Losing the Peace	William Leisner	June 30, 2009	978-1-4391-0786-7
Indistinguishable From Magic	David A. McIntee	March 29, 2011	978-1-4516-0615-7
The Stuff of Dreams ◊	James Swallow	March 25, 2013	978-1-4516-9661-5
The Light Fantastic	Jeffrey Lang	June 24, 2014	978-1-4767-5051-4
Q Are Cordially Uninvited... ◊	Rudy Josephs	October 6, 2014	978-1-4767-7882-2
Takedown	John Jackson Miller	January 27, 2015	978-1-4767-8271-3
Armageddon's Arrow	Dayton Ward	May 26, 2015	978-1-4767-8269-0
Headlong Flight	Dayton Ward	January 31, 2017	978-1-5011-1131-0
Hearts and Minds	Dayton Ward	May 30, 2017	978-1-5011-4731-9
Available Light	Dayton Ward	April 9, 2019	978-1-9821-1327-8
Collateral Damage	David Mack	October 8, 2019	978-1-9821-1358-2

== See also ==
- List of Star Trek novels
