= Gene DeWeese =

American science-fiction writer

- Born: Thomas Eugene DeWeese; January 31, 1934; Rochester, Indiana, U.S.
- Died: March 19, 2012 (aged 78); Milwaukee, Wisconsin, U.S.
- Occupation: Writer
- Writing career
- Pen name: Jean DeWeese, Thomas Stratton, Victoria Thomas

Thomas Eugene DeWeese (January 31, 1934 – March 19, 2012) was an American writer of science fiction, best known for his Star Trek novels. He also wrote Gothic, mystery, and young adult fiction, totalling more than 40 books in his career. He published as Gene DeWeese and Jean DeWeese; his pseudonyms as a collaborator included Thomas Stratton and Victoria Thomas.

== Background and fandom ==
DeWeese was born January 31, 1934, in Rochester, Indiana. He began writing science fiction stories in grade school, beginning with a Mickey Mouse story he wrote. In high school, he wrote articles and science-fiction columns for his local newspaper. DeWeese became an active member of science fiction fandom, and his stories were published in science fiction fanzines such as Yandro, Fan-Fare, and The Chigger Patch of Fandom. He earned an associate degree in electronics from Valparaiso Technical Institute in 1953. He worked for General Motors' Delco Electronics Division as an electronics technician in Kokomo, Indiana, from 1954 to 1959, and as a technical writer (including for the Apollo Program) in Milwaukee, Wisconsin, from 1959 to 1974 (when he became a full-time freelance writer).

== Professional writing ==
DeWeese's first professionally published fiction was a Man from U.N.C.L.E. book written with Robert Coulson using the pseudonym Thomas Stratton, which used DeWeese's first name and Coulson's middle name. This first novel was The Invisibility Affair and was followed up in the series by The Mind-Twisters Affair (both 1967) Coulson was a fellow science fiction fan, and the two had previously used the Stratton name for fiction published in fanzines. He wrote nine Gothic novels as Jean DeWeese, and co-wrote a romance novel with Connie Kugi under the pseudonym Victoria Thomas. DeWeese wrote over forty books, including science fiction, mystery, horror, and romance, and nonfiction books on computers and doll making. He has written novels in the Star Trek, Lost in Space, and Dinotopia series. His best-known young adult novel is The Adventures of a Two-Minute Werewolf, which was made into a television movie of the same name. He has also written for Ravenloft (King of the Dead and Lord of the Necropolis) and the Amazing Stories series.

== Papers and personal life ==
His papers from 1967 to 2002 are held at the library of the University of Southern Mississippi.

He and Beverly lived in Milwaukee from 1959 to his death at home in 2012 from Lewy body dementia.

== Star Trek novels ==
- Chain of Attack (1987) - Based on Star Trek: The Original Series
- The Peacekeepers (September 1988) - Based on Star Trek: The Next Generation
- The Final Nexus (December 1988) - Based on Star Trek: The Original Series
- Renegade (1991) - Based on Star Trek: The Original Series
- Probe (1992) - Credited by Margaret Wander Bonanno for being the actual writer of most of the book
- Into the Nebula (1995) - Based on Star Trek: The Next Generation
- Engines of Destiny (2005) - Based on Star Trek: The Next Generation, though the main character is Montgomery Scott
