= Survivors (Lorrah novel) =

1989 novel by Jean Lorrah

- Author: Jean Lorrah
- Cover artist: Enric
- Language: English
- Series: Star Trek: The Next Generation
- Release number: 4
- Subject: Science fiction
- Publisher: Pocket Books
- Publication date: January 1989
- Publication place: United States
- Media type: Print (Paperback)
- Pages: 253
- ISBN: 0-671-67438-2 (U.S.); 1-85286-095-2 (U.K.)
- Preceded by: The Children of Hamlin
- Followed by: Strike Zone

Survivors is a science fiction novel by American writer Jean Lorrah in the Star Trek expanded universe. The book is by Jean Lorrah, and takes place in the Star Trek: The Next Generation era.

== Plot ==
The Enterprise is called in to deal with Treva, a human colony on the fringes of known space. For a time, it was thought to be a suitable candidate for Federation membership. Now it has sent a distress call because a brutal warlord has seized power and a revolution has sprung up.

Tasha Yar is sent down with the android Data. The two soon discover the situation is more complicated than originally thought. The warlord wants Federation weapons to use against the rebels and is willing to kill whomever it takes to accomplish this goal.

The novel also focuses on the unique relationship between Yar and Data and how the current situation correlates with Yar's brutal childhood.
