= List of Star Trek: Enterprise novels =

List of Star Trek: Enterprise novels based on the American science fiction television series of the same name. The book line was published by Simon & Schuster imprints Pocket Books, Pocket Star, Gallery, and Atria.

From 2001 to 2003, the book line was published as Enterprise, without the Star Trek prefix. Likewise, the television series did not include the prefix on its title card until season three.

All novels published as paperback editions, except where indicated.
†	Hardcover first edition
ed.	Omnibus or collection editor(s)

== Episode novelizations ==
Based on select episodes from the television series:

Title	Author(s)	Date	ISBN
Broken Bow †	Diane Carey	October 2, 2001	0-7434-4862-6
Shockwave †	Paul Ruditis	October 15, 2002	0-7434-6455-9
The Expanse	J. M. Dillard	September 30, 2003	0-7434-8485-1

== Original novels ==
The novels were more closely plotted to events of the television series compared to previous book lines. Daedalus (2003) and Daedalus's Children (2004) form a two-part novel that explores the aftermath of a prototype warp ship's disastrous launch thirteen years prior to the launch of the Enterprise (NX-01).

Title	Author(s)	Date	ISBN
By the Book	Dean Wesley Smith and Kristine Kathryn Rusch	January 2, 2002	0-7434-4871-5
What Price Honor?	Dave Stern	October 29, 2002	0-7434-6278-5
Surak's Soul	J. M. Dillard	February 25, 2003	0-7434-6280-7
Daedalus	Dave Stern	November 25, 2003	0-7434-7118-0
Daedalus's Children	Dave Stern	April 27, 2004	0-7434-7646-8
Tales from the Captain's Table (short story collection)	Keith DeCandido, ed.	June 14, 2005	1-4165-0520-2
Rosetta	Dave Stern	January 31, 2006	1-4165-0956-9

== Relaunch novels ==
Interlinked novels set after the episode "These Are the Voyages...":

Title	Author(s)	Date	ISBN
Last Full Measure	Andy Mangels and Michael A. Martin	April 25, 2006	1-4165-0358-7
The Good That Men Do	Andy Mangels and Michael A. Martin	February 27, 2007	978-0-7434-4001-1
Kobayashi Maru (Note: Similarly named novels: The Kobayashi Maru (1989), a novel by Julia Ecklar; Kobayashi Maru (2008), an Enterprise novel by Michael A. Martin and Andy Mangels.)	Andy Mangels and Michael A. Martin	August 26, 2008	978-1-4165-5480-6

=== Romulan War (2009–2011) ===
Star Trek: Enterprise – Romulan War explores the events of the Earth–Romulan War from the perspective of the Enterprise crew.

Title	Author	Date	ISBN
Beneath the Raptor's Wing	Michael A. Martin	October 20, 2009	978-1-4391-0798-0
To Brave the Storm	Michael A. Martin	October 25, 2011	978-1-4516-0715-4

=== Rise of the Federation (2013–2017) ===
Star Trek: Enterprise – Rise of the Federation explores the creation of the United Federation of Planets, and the eventual rise of Jonathan Archer to President of the Federation.

Title	Author	Date	ISBN
A Choice of Futures	Christopher L. Bennett	June 25, 2013	978-1-4767-0674-0
Tower of Babel	Christopher L. Bennett	March 25, 2014	978-1-4767-4964-8
Uncertain Logic	Christopher L. Bennett	March 24, 2015	978-1-4767-7911-9
Live by the Code	Christopher L. Bennett	March 29, 2016	978-1-4767-7913-3
Patterns of Interference	Christopher L. Bennett	August 29, 2017	978-1-5011-6570-2

== See also ==
- List of Star Trek novels
