= Christopher L. Bennett =

American science fiction author

- Occupation: Author
- Writing career
- Genre: Science fiction
- Website: christopherlbennett.wordpress.com

Christopher L. Bennett is an American science fiction author. He has written several tie-in novels and short stories in the Star Trek and Marvel Comics franchises starting in 2003, as well as his first original novel in 2012 and several original stories for Analog Science Fiction and Fact and other magazines. He lives in Cincinnati, Ohio.

== Bibliography ==
=== Novels ===
- Bennett, Christopher L. (2012). Only superhuman. Tor.
- Bennett, Christopher L. (2020). Arachne's Crime. eSpec Books.
- Bennett, Christopher L. (2021). Arachne's Exile. eSpec Books.
- Bennett, Christopher L. (2021). The Arachne Omnibus. eSpec Books.

==== Audiobooks ====
- Bennett, Christopher L. (2021). Tangent Knights 1: Caprice of Fate. GraphicAudio.

==== Star Trek ====
- Star Trek TOS - The Face of the Unknown (2017)
- Star Trek - Ex Machina (2004)
- Star Trek: Titan - Orion's Hounds (2005)
- Star Trek: The Next Generation - The Buried Age (2007)
- Places of Exile - Star Trek: Myriad Universes - Infinity's Prism (2008)
- Star Trek: The Next Generation - Greater Than the Sum (2008)
- Star Trek: Titan - Over a Torrent Sea (2009)
- Star Trek - Seek a Newer World (2010) (unreleased)
- Star Trek: Department of Temporal Investigations - Watching the Clock (2011)
- Star Trek: Department of Temporal Investigations - Forgotten History (2012)
- Star Trek: Department of Temporal Investigations - The Collectors (2014)
- Star Trek: Department of Temporal Investigations - Time Lock (2016)
- Star Trek: Department of Temporal Investigations - Shield of the Gods (2017)
- Star Trek: Enterprise - Rise of the Federation: A Choice of Futures (2013)
- Star Trek: Enterprise - Rise of the Federation: Tower of Babel (2014)
- Star Trek: Enterprise - Rise of the Federation: Uncertain Logic (2015)
- Star Trek: Enterprise - Rise of the Federation: Live by the Code (2016)
- Star Trek: Enterprise - Rise of the Federation: Patterns of Interference (2017)
- Star Trek: The Original Series - The Captain's Oath (2019)
- Star Trek: The Original Series - The Higher Frontier (2020)
- Star Trek: The Original Series - Living Memory (2021)

=== Short fiction ===
- "Aggravated Vehicular Genocide" - Analog Science Fiction and Fact (1998)
- "Among the Wild Cybers of Cybele" - Analog Science Fiction and Fact (2000)
- "The Hub of the Matter" - Analog Science Fiction and Fact (2010)
- "The Weight of Silence" - Alternative Coordinates (2010)
- "No Dominion" - DayBreak Magazine (2010)
- "Home is Where the Hub Is" - Analog Science Fiction and Fact (2010)
- "Make Hub, not war" - Analog Science Fiction and Fact (2013) - Illustrated by John Allemand
- "The Caress of a Butterfly's Wing" - Buzzy Mag (2014)
- Hub Space: Tales from the Greater Galaxy (2015) - ebook collection of Hub stories 1-3 from Analog (trade paperback 2018)
- "Murder on the Cislunar Railroad" - Analog Science Fiction and Fact (2016)
- "Twilight's Captives" - Analog Science Fiction and Fact (2017)
- "Abductive Reasoning" - Analog Science Fiction and Fact (2017)
- "Hubpoint of No Return" - Analog Science Fiction and Fact (2018)
- Among the Wild Cybers: Tales Beyond the Superhuman - story collection (2018)
- "Aspiring to Be Angels" - original to Among the Wild Cybers (2018)
- "...And He Built a Crooked Hub" - Analog Science Fiction and Fact (2018)
- "Hubstitute Creatures" - Analog Science Fiction and Fact (2018)
- "The Melody Lingers" - Galaxy's Edge (2019)
- Crimes of the Hub (2019) - collection of Hub stories 4-6 from Analog
- "The Stuff that Dreams Are Made Of" - Footprints in the Stars anthology
- "Conventional Powers" - Analog Science Fiction and Fact (2019)
- "Comfort Zones" - original to The Arachne Omnibus (2021)

==== Star Trek ====
- "Aftermath" - Star Trek: Starfleet Corps of Engineers (2003)
- "...Lov'd I Not Honor More" - Star Trek: Deep Space Nine: Prophecy and Change (2003)
- "Brief Candle" - Star Trek: Voyager: Distant Shores (2005)
- "As Others See Us" - Star Trek: Constellations (2006)
- "The Darkness Drops Again" - Star Trek: Mere Anarchy (2007)
- "Friends With the Sparrows" - Star Trek: The Next Generation: The Sky's the Limit (2007)
- "Empathy" - Star Trek: Mirror Universe: Shards and Shadows (2009)
- "The Struggle Within" - Star Trek: Typhon Pact (2011)
- "The Collectors" - Star Trek: Department of Temporal Investigations (2014)
- "Time Lock" - Star Trek: Department of Temporal Investigations (2016)
- "Shield of the Gods" - Star Trek: Department of Temporal Investigations (2017)

=== Marvel Comics ===
- X-Men: Watchers on the Walls (2006)
- Spider-Man: Drowned in Thunder (2008)
