= List of Star Trek: Deep Space Nine novels =

List of Star Trek: Deep Space Nine novels based on the American science fiction television series of the same name. The book line was published by Simon & Schuster imprints Pocket Books, Pocket Star, Gallery, and Atria.

More recent Deep Space Nine novels link directly with other Star Trek book lines and series, such as: Destiny (2008), Typhon Pact (2010–2012), The Fall (2013–14), and the relaunch of the Section 31 series.

Key:
All novels published as paperback editions, except where indicated.
†	Hardcover first edition.
^	Children's or young adult book.
◊	Published as an ebook exclusive.
‡	Included in omnibus or collection.
#	Published as a numbered novel.
Navy	Miniseries name.
Pink	Crossover series name.
ed.	Omnibus or collection editor(s).
et al.	Multiple authors, see note.

== Episode novelizations ==
Based on select episodes from the television series. Call to Arms (1998) and Sacrifice of Angels (1998) are adaptations of the seven episode arc from Deep Space Nine's fifth and sixth beginning with "Call to Arms" and ending with "Sacrifice to Angels".

Title	Author(s)	Date	ISBN
Emissary #	J. M. Dillard	February 1993	0-671-79858-8
The Search	Diane Carey	October 1994	0-671-50604-8
The Way of the Warrior	Diane Carey	October 1995	0-671-56813-2
Trials and Tribble-ations	Diane Carey	December 1996	0-671-00902-8
Far Beyond the Stars	Steven Barnes	April 1998	0-671-02430-2
Call to Arms (The Dominion War, Book 2)	Diane Carey	November 1998	0-671-02497-3
Sacrifice of Angels (The Dominion War, Book 4)	Diane Carey	December 1998	0-671-02498-1
What You Leave Behind	Diane Carey	June 1999	0-671-03476-6

== Numbered novels ==
Numbered paperback releases:

No.	Title	Author(s)	Date	ISBN
1	Emissary (novelization)	J. M. Dillard	February 1993	0-671-79858-8
2	The Siege	Peter David	May 1993	0-671-87083-1
3	Bloodletter	K. W. Jeter	August 1993	0-671-87275-3
4	The Big Game	Sandy Schofield	November 1993	0-671-88030-6
5	Fallen Heroes	Dafydd ab Hugh	February 1994	0-671-88459-X
6	Betrayal	Lois Tilton	May 1994	0-671-88117-5
7	Warchild	Esther Friesner	September 1994	0-671-88116-7
8	Antimatter	John Vornholt	November 1994	0-671-88560-X
9	Proud Helios	Melissa Scott	February 1995	0-671-88390-9
10	Valhalla	Nathan Archer	April 1995	0-671-88115-9
11	Devil in the Sky	Greg Cox and John Gregory Betancourt	June 1995	0-671-88114-0
12	The Laertian Gamble	Robert Sheckley	September 1995	0-671-88690-8
13	Station Rage	Diane Carey	November 1995	0-671-88561-8
14	The Long Night	Dean Wesley Smith and Kristine Kathryn Rusch	February 1996	0-671-55165-5
15	Objective: Bajor	John Peel	June 1996	0-671-56811-6
16	Time's Enemy ‡ (Invasion!, Book 3)	L. A. Graf	August 1996	0-671-54150-1
17	The Heart of the Warrior	John Gregory Betancourt	October 1996	0-671-00239-2
18	Saratoga	Michael Jan Friedman	November 1996	0-671-56897-3
19	The Tempest	Susan Wright	February 1997	0-671-00227-9
20	Wrath of the Prophets	Peter David, Michael Jan Friedman, and Robert Greenberger	May 1997	0-671-53817-9
21	Trial by Error	Mark Garland	November 1997	0-671-00251-1
22	Vengeance	Dafydd ab Hugh	February 1998	0-671-00468-9
23	The 34th Rule	Armin Shimerman and David R. George III	January 1999	0-671-00793-9
24	The Conquered (Rebels, Book 1)	Dafydd ab Hugh	February 1999	0-671-01140-5
25	The Courageous (Rebels, Book 2)	Dafydd ab Hugh	February 1999	0-671-01141-3
26	The Liberated (Rebels, Book 3)	Dafydd ab Hugh	March 1999	0-671-01142-1
27	A Stitch in Time (Note: Status as a Deep Space Nine relaunch novel is disputed among primary sources.)	Andrew J. Robinson	May 2000	0-671-03885-0

== Young adult novels ==
Star Trek: Deep Space Nine young adult series follows the adventures of Jake Sisko and Nog while living aboard Deep Space Nine.

No.	Title ^	Author(s)	Date	ISBN
1	The Star Ghost	Brad Strickland	February 1994	0-671-87999-5
2	Stowaways	Brad Strickland	April 1994	0-671-88000-4
3	Prisoners of Peace	John Peel	October 1994	0-671-88288-0
4	The Pet	Mel Gilden and Ted Pedersen	December 1994	0-671-88352-6
5	Arcade	Diana Gallagher	June 1995	0-671-89678-4
6	Field Trip	John Peel	August 1995	0-671-88287-2
7	Gypsy World	Ted Pedersen	February 1996	0-671-51115-7
8	Highest Score	Kem Antilles	June 1996	0-671-89936-8
9	Cardassian Imps	Mel Gilden	February 1997	0-671-51116-5
10	Space Camp	Ted Pedersen	June 1997	0-671-00730-0
11	Honor Bound (Note: Similarly named novels: Honor Bound (1997), a Deep Space Nine young adult novella by Diana G. Gallagher; Honor Bound (2003), an I.K.S. Gorkon novel by Keith DeCandido.) ‡ (Day of Honor)	Diana G. Gallagher	October 1997	0-671-01452-8
12	Trapped in Time	Ted Pedersen	February 1998	0-671-01440-4

== Original novels ==
Includes hardcover and paperback releases set within the continuity of the television series:

Title	Author(s)	Date	ISBN
Warped (Note: Similarly named works: Warped (1995), a Deep Space Nine novel by K. W. Jeter; Warped (2015), a The Next Generation parody episode guide by Mike McMahan.) †	K. W. Jeter	March 1995	0-671-87252-4
Hollow Men	Una McCormack	April 26, 2005	0-7434-9151-3
Revenant	Alex White	December 21, 2021	978-1-9821-6082-1
The Peacemakers (forthcoming)	Una McCormack	August 4, 2026	978-1-6680-9693-2

== Crossover novels ==
Crossover novels that feature characters and settings from the various television series and films, including Deep Space Nine.

Title	Author(s)	Date	ISBN
Armageddon Sky ‡ (Day of Honor, Book 2)	L. A. Graf	September 1997	0-671-00675-4
Honor Bound ‡ (Day of Honor)	Diana G. Gallagher	October 1997	0-671-01452-8
The Mist ‡ (The Captain's Table, Book 3)	Dean Wesley Smith and Kristine Kathryn Rusch (Note: The Mist (1998), as by Benjamin Sisko, told in his own words, as recorded by Dean Wesley Smith and Kristine Kathryn Rusch.)	July 1998	0-671-01471-4
The Badlands, Book One	Susan Wright	December 1999	0-671-03957-1
The Badlands, Book Two	Susan Wright	December 1999	0-671-03958-X
Dark Passions, Book One	Susan Wright	January 2, 2001	0-671-78785-3
Dark Passions, Book Two	Susan Wright	January 2, 2001	0-671-78786-1
Abyss ‡ (Section 31, Book 4)	David Weddle and Jeffrey Lang	June 26, 2001	0-671-77483-2
Demons of Air and Darkness ‡ (Gateways, Book 4)	Keith DeCandido	August 28, 2001	0-7434-1852-2
What Lay Beyond † (Gateways, Book 7)	John J. Ordover (Note: What Lay Beyond (2001) by John J. Ordover, editor, with Diane Carey, Peter David, Keith DeCandido, Christie Golden, Robert Greenberger, and Susan Wright.)	October 30, 2001	0-7434-3112-X
The Brave and the Bold, Book One	Keith DeCandido	November 26, 2002	0-7434-1922-7
The Brave and the Bold, Book Two	Keith DeCandido	November 26, 2002	0-7434-1923-5

== Omnibus editions ==
Collections of novels from the Deep Space Nine book line.

Title	Author(s)	Date	ISBN
Invasion!	John J. Ordover, ed. (Note: Invasion! (1998) by John J. Ordover, editor, with Diane Carey, Dean Wesley Smith, Kristine Kathryn Rusch, L.A. Graf, and Dafydd ab Hugh.)	June 1998	0-671-02185-0
Day of Honor	Diane Carey, et al. (Note: Day of Honor (1999) by Diane Carey, L.A. Graf, Michael Jan Friedman, Dean Wesley Smith and Kristine Kathryn Rusch, and Diane G. Gallagher.)	March 1999	0-671-02813-8
The Captain's Table	L. A. Graf, et al. (Note: The Captain's Table (2000) by L.A. Graf, Michael Jan Friedman, Dean Wesley Smith and Kristine Kathryn Rusch, Diane Carey, Peter David, Jerry Oltion.)	March 2000	0-671-04052-9
Millennium	Judith and Garfield Reeves-Stevens	January 2, 2002	0-7434-4249-0
Twist of Faith	S. D. Perry, et al. (Note: Twist of Faith (2007) by S.D. Perry, David Weddle and Jeffrey Lang, Keith DeCandido.)	May 22, 2007	978-1-4165-3415-0
These Haunted Seas	David R. George III and Heather Jarman	June 17, 2008	978-1-4165-5639-8

== Miniseries ==
=== Rebels (1999) ===
Star Trek: Deep Space Nine – Rebels miniseries explores consequences of a rebellion led by the crew of the USS Defiant (NX-74205). Published as part of the numbered novel series, books 24 to 26.

No.	Title #	Author	Date	ISBN
1	The Conquered	Dafydd ab Hugh	February 1999	0-671-01140-5
2	The Courageous	Dafydd ab Hugh	February 1999	0-671-01141-3
3	The Liberated	Dafydd ab Hugh	March 1999	0-671-01142-1

=== Millennium (2000) ===
Star Trek: Deep Space Nine – Millennium miniseries explores an alternate-timeline accidentally created by the crew of the USS Defiant (NX-74205). The series was partially adapted as The Fallen (2000), a third-person shooter video game developed by The Collective. An omnibus edition was published in 2002.

No.	Title	Author(s)	Date	ISBN
1	The Fall of Terok Nor	Judith and Garfield Reeves-Stevens	March 2000	0-671-02401-9
2	The War of the Prophets	Judith and Garfield Reeves-Stevens	March 2000	0-671-02402-7
3	Inferno	Judith and Garfield Reeves-Stevens	April 2000	0-671-02403-5

=== Mission Gamma (2002) ===
Star Trek: Deep Space Nine – Mission Gamma relaunch miniseries follows the crew of the USS Defiant (NX-74205) under the command of Elias Vaughn. These Haunted Seas (2008) omnibus collects Twilight (2002) and This Gray Spirit (2002). The cover art by Cliff Nielsen forms a polyptych. Original Sin (2017) has a similar premise.

No.	Title	Author(s)	Date	ISBN
1	Twilight ‡	David R. George III	August 27, 2002	0-7434-4560-0
2	This Gray Spirit ‡	Heather Jarman	August 27, 2002	0-7434-4562-7
3	Cathedral	Michael A. Martin and Andy Mangels	October 1, 2002	0-7434-4564-3
4	Lesser Evil	Robert Simpson	October 29, 2002	0-7434-1024-6

=== Worlds of Deep Space Nine (2004–05) ===
Worlds of Star Trek: Deep Space Nine relaunch miniseries explores the home worlds of the crew and residents of Deep Space Nine. The series was edited by Marco Palmieri.

No.	Title	Author(s)	Date	ISBN
1	Cardassia and Andor	Una McCormack and Heather Jarman	May 25, 2004	0-7434-8351-0
2	Trill and Bajor	Andy Mangels, Michael A. Martin, and J. Noah Kym	January 25, 2005	0-7434-8352-9
3	Ferenginar and The Dominion	Keith DeCandido and David R. George III	January 25, 2005	0-7434-8353-7

=== Terok Nor (2008) ===
Star Trek: Terok Nor relaunch miniseries explores the history of the Deep Space Nine station during the Bajoran Occupation when it was known by its Cardassian name: Terok Nor. The series is linked to the Lost Era (2003–2014). The cover art by John Picacio forms a triptych. The Deep Space Nine subtitle was omitted.

No.	Title	Author(s)	Date	ISBN
1	Day of the Vipers	James Swallow	March 25, 2008	978-1-4165-5093-8
2	Night of the Wolves	S. D. Perry and Britta Dennison	April 29, 2008	978-0-7434-8251-6
3	Dawn of the Eagles	S. D. Perry and Britta Dennison	May 20, 2008	978-0-7434-8252-3

=== Gamma (2017) ===
Star Trek: Deep Space Nine – Gamma relaunch miniseries follows the crew of USS Robinson (NCC-71842) under the command of Benjamin Sisko. Only one novel has been published. Mission Gamma (2002) has a similar premise.

Title	Author	Date	ISBN
Original Sin	David R. George III	September 26, 2017	978-1-5011-3322-0

== Short story collections ==
Collections featuring characters and settings from Deep Space Nine.

Title	Editor(s)	Date	ISBN
Legends of the Ferengi	Robert Hewitt Wolfe and Ira Steven Behr (Note: As by Quark, as told to Robert Hewitt Wolfe and Ira Steven Behr.)	July 1997	0-671-00728-9
Adventures in Time and Space (excerpt collection)	Mary P. Taylor	August 1999	0-671-03415-4
The Lives of Dax (Note: Originally published as Star Trek: The Lives of Dax. Additional printings included the rounded word mark used for the Star Trek: Deep Space Nine relaunch series.)	Marco Palmieri	December 1999	0-671-02840-5
What Lay Beyond † (Gateways, Book 7)	John J. Ordover	October 30, 2001	0-7434-3112-X
Prophecy and Change	Marco Palmieri	September 23, 2003	0-7434-7073-7
Tales of the Dominion War	Keith DeCandido	August 3, 2004	0-7434-9171-8
Tales from the Captain's Table	Keith DeCandido	June 14, 2005	1-4165-0520-2
Seven Deadly Sins	Margaret Clark	March 16, 2010	978-1-4391-0944-1

== Relaunch novels ==
These are interlinked novels set after the episode "What You Leave Behind". The Lives of Dax (2001), a short story collection edited by Marco Palmieri, and A Stitch in Time (2000), by Andrew J. Robinson, are linked to the relaunch.

Title	Author(s)	Date	ISBN
Avatar, Book One ‡	S. D. Perry	May 1, 2001	0-7434-0050-X
Avatar, Book Two ‡	S. D. Perry	May 1, 2001	0-7434-0051-8
Abyss ‡ (Section 31, Book 4)	David Weddle and Jeffrey Lang	June 26, 2001	0-671-77483-2
Demons of Air and Darkness ‡ (Gateways, Book 4)	Keith DeCandido	August 28, 2001	0-7434-1852-2
Rising Son	S. D. Perry	December 31, 2002	0-7434-4838-3
The Left Hand of Destiny, Book One	J. G. Hertzler and Jeffrey Lang	April 1, 2003	0-7434-2328-3
The Left Hand of Destiny, Book Two	J. G. Hertzler and Jeffrey Lang	April 23, 2003	0-7434-2329-1
Unity †	S. D. Perry	November 18, 2003	0-7434-4840-5
Warpath	David Mack	March 28, 2006	1-4165-0775-2
Fearful Symmetry (Note: Similarly named novels: Fearful Symmetry (2008), a Deep Space Nine novel by Olivia Woods; Fearful Symmetry, an unpublished novel attributed to Kevin Ryan.)	Olivia Woods	June 24, 2008	978-1-4165-6781-3
The Soul Key	Olivia Woods	July 28, 2009	978-1-4391-0792-8
The Never-Ending Sacrifice	Una McCormack	August 25, 2009	978-1-4391-0961-8
Lust's Latinum Lost (and Found) ◊	Paula M. Block and Terry J. Erdmann	September 1, 2014 (Note: Exact date of release is not known, or not available via primary sources. Approximated to the nearest month.)	978-1-4767-7931-7
The Missing	Una McCormack	December 30, 2014	978-1-4767-5023-1
Sacraments of Fire	David R. George III	June 30, 2015	978-1-4767-5633-2
Ascendance	David R. George III	December 29, 2015	978-1-5011-0370-4
Force and Motion	Jeffrey Lang	May 31, 2016	978-1-5011-1073-3
Rules of Accusation ◊	Paula M. Block and Terry J. Erdmann	July 4, 2016	978-1-5011-1068-9
The Long Mirage	David R. George III	February 28, 2017	978-1-5011-3297-1
Enigma Tales	Una McCormack	June 27, 2017	978-1-5011-5258-0
I, The Constable ◊	Paula M. Block and Terry J. Erdmann	November 13, 2017	978-1-5011-6974-8

== See also ==
- List of Star Trek novels
