= Imzadi =

Non-canon Star Trek novel by Peter David

- Author: Peter David
- Genre: Science fiction, romance
- Publisher: Pocket Books
- Publication date: August 1, 1992
- Pages: 352
- ISBN: 978-0-671-86729-4

Imzadi is a non-canon Star Trek novel by Peter David, primarily exploring William Riker's assignment to Betazed and his early relationship with Deanna Troi.

Imzadi has a complex structure, involving time travel through the Guardian of Forever, but a straightforward plot of love and rescue. Troi's history with Riker had been introduced in the pilot episode of Star Trek: The Next Generation, "Encounter at Farpoint"; this also included the word imzadi, a Betazoid term of endearment usually translated as "beloved". The novel expands on the meaning of imzadi when Troi explains that its literal meaning is "the first," not necessarily referring to the first sexual partner but, as Troi puts it to Riker, "the first to ever touch your soul."

== Setting ==
- Chapters 1 to 6, an unnumbered epilogue chapter (between chapters 10 and 11), chapters 34 to 36, and chapter 44 take place in 2408.
- Chapters 7 to 10, 33, and 37 to 43 take place in 2368.
- Chapters 11 to 31 take place in 2359.
- Chapter 32 takes place in 2364.

== Plot ==
Seventy-three-year-old Admiral William Riker is a bitter, lonely man in a slow downward spiral following the death forty years earlier of Deanna Troi, who died of undetermined causes during a peacekeeping conference with an enemy race, the Sindareen. Riker, now the commander of an unimportant starbase, is summoned to Betazed as Deanna's mother, Lwaxana Troi, lies dying. While going through Lwaxana's possessions after her death, Riker is reminded of how he and Deanna originally met and began their relationship on Betazed.

In a lengthy flashback, it is revealed that Will and Deanna met when Will was stationed on Betazed between assignments, and while there attended a wedding at which Deanna was maid of honor. Will was instantly attracted to her and began to pursue her, though she initially rebuffed his advances, feeling that he was only interested in her physical attributes, and that he preferred quick, thrilling encounters over meaningful emotional intimacy. Over a series of meetings, however, they began to grow closer, as Will encouraged Deanna to embrace impulsive feelings and Deanna encouraged Will to explore his more spiritual side.

While visiting her favorite museum, Deanna was kidnapped by a Sindareen raiding party, and Riker's Starfleet security force shot down their small craft in the jungle. Riker tracked them down and killed the only surviving captor, leaving Deanna and him alone together. In the jungle, they consummated their relationship, and Deanna told Will for the first time that they are "Imzadi." However, after their return from the jungle, Lwaxana's violent objections to their relationship and Deanna's seeming compliance led Riker to drunkenly fall into bed with another woman. Deanna discovered them together when she appeared at his living quarters, having planned to tell him she had decided to defy her mother's wishes. Deanna and Will decided not to pursue a relationship and Riker left the planet shortly thereafter, not to meet Deanna again until they were both assigned to the Enterprise-D.

In the future timeline, Commodore Data, now in command of the Enterprise-F, tells Riker that scientists studying the Guardian of Forever have discovered that Deanna's death was a focal point in time, causing the creation of a parallel timeline; his intention is to comfort Riker with the idea that Deanna lives on in another universe. Struck with a new suspicion, Admiral Riker has an autopsy performed on Deanna's corpse and discovers that she had been murdered via a poison that did not exist at the time she died. Deducing that someone had gone back in time to murder her and deliberately alter the timeline, Admiral Riker travels to the Guardian of Forever and goes back to the time of the Sindareen peace conference on the Enterprise-D, a short while before Deanna's death. He gives Commander Riker the antidote to the poison, and Riker administers it to Deanna. Her death is thus prevented, but Admiral Riker does not immediately return to his timeline, indicating that the danger to her has not yet passed.

Commodore Data has also pursued Admiral Riker through the Guardian, feeling it is his duty to preserve the timeline by any means. He disables Commander Data and impersonates him, taking Deanna away from the peace conference with the intention of killing her. Admiral Riker realizes Data may try this, so he locates Commander Data and with him confronts Commodore Data, and they fight. As the peace conference attendees look on, Deanna finally becomes familiar enough with the representatives from the Sindareen (a race difficult to read empathically without sufficient exposure) to determine that they are deceiving everyone, and have no real peaceful intentions; the peace conference is only an attempt to stall for time so that their race can become more powerful. One of the Sindareen delegates is actually from the future and had decided to go back in time and kill Deanna to prevent this discovery. When Deanna announces that the Sindareen are behaving duplicitously, the Sindareen makes a last-ditch effort to kill Deanna, which is thwarted by Admiral Riker.

Once Deanna is safe, everyone from the future returns to their proper timeline, where the Guardian of Forever intones that "All is as it was." Data is chagrined that he never thought to ask whether Admiral Riker was correct about the timeline being altered. Now that it has been restored, Admiral Riker and the others have no way of knowing what awaits them. Riker hears his Imzadi's voice inside his mind, welcoming him home.

== Sequel ==
=== Imzadi II: Triangle ===
The 1998 sequel Imzadi II: Triangle addresses Worf's romantic interest in Troi, William Riker's renewed interest and Thomas Riker's resentment at his lost opportunity with Troi. Imzadi II: Triangle brings in additional characters and multiple plot lines.

== Other versions ==
Both Imzadi novels were re-released in 2003 as the omnibus collection Imzadi Forever.

Abridged versions of the novels were also released as audiobooks. Imzadi was read by Jonathan Frakes (the actor who played Riker), and Imzadi II by Robert O'Reilly (whose recurring onscreen role was the Klingon Gowron).

Extracts from both books were included in Star Trek: Adventures in Time and Space, which was described by the editor as featuring clips from the best of twenty years of Pocket Books official Star Trek line.

== Reception ==
Imzadi is rated 4 out of 5 on Google books.

A TrekMovie.com reviewer writing in 2010 about Peter David's later works mentioned that Imzadi remained his favorite Star Trek book of all time. In 2015, "Imzadi" was noted as one of better Star Trek novels, noting an audio book narrated by Jonathan Frakes himself (who played Commander Riker on the TV show).

In 2015, John Bardinelli of Barnesandnoble.com highlighted this as among of the best Star Trek novels.
