= Treklanta =

Annual Star Trek convention in the United States

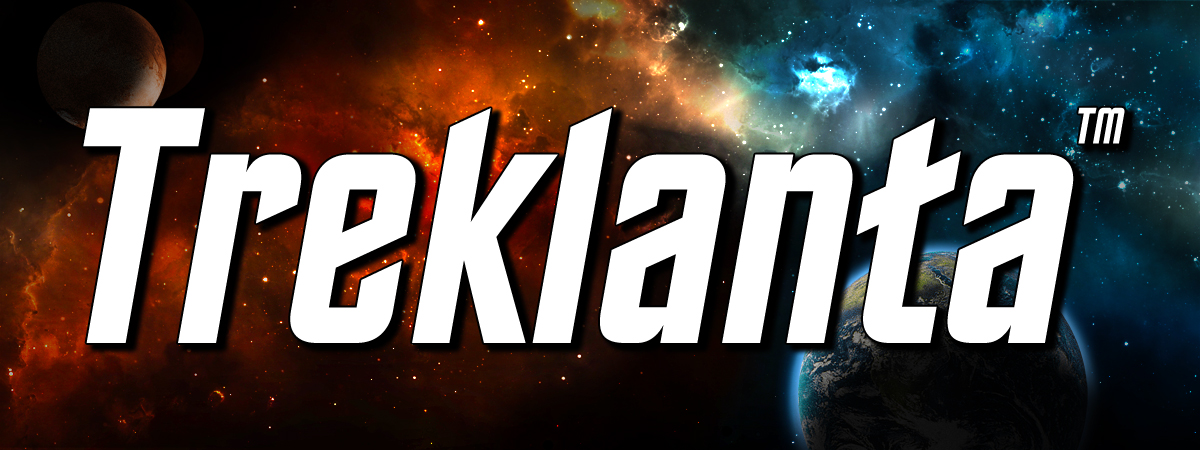
- Status: Inactive
- Genre: Star Trek
- Location: Atlanta, Georgia
- Country: United States
- Inaugurated: 2011
- Attendance: 257 (2011), 240 (2012), 181 (2013), 246 (2014), 298 (2015), 300 (2016), 320 (2017)
- Organizer: Eric L. Watts, Chairman; USS Republic NCC-1371
- Website: treklanta.org

Treklanta was an annual Star Trek convention based in Atlanta, Georgia, United States that placed special emphasis on fan-based events, activities, programming and productions. It hosted the annual Miss Klingon Empire Beauty Pageant and Bjo Awards Ceremony (formerly the Independent Star Trek Fan Film Awards).

== History ==
The founding of Treklanta (formerly "TrekTrax Atlanta") was, in many respects, a result of its founder and chairman, Eric L. Watts—who had served as Dragon*Con's Director of Star Trek Programming from 1993 to 2009—not being asked to return for an 18th year by Dragon*Con management in December 2009. In February 2010, several members of the USS Republic, the chapter of STARFLEET International in Atlanta of which Watts is "Commanding Officer" (president), encouraged Watts to continue his service to fandom by launching a new convention in Atlanta, which had not hosted an exclusive, Star Trek-only convention since 1993. Pledging their support, a core group of Republic members immediately began laying the groundwork for a new convention and three months later, on Memorial Day Weekend, Watts issued a press release announcing TrekTrax Atlanta. In October 2014, Watts announced on the convention's Facebook page that the name of the convention was being changed to "Treklanta" to make it "easier to pronounce, easier to spell and hopefully easier to remember" and because "it more clearly and more succinctly conveys the essence of what our convention is all about."

The first three conventions, held from 2011 to 2013, were devoted exclusively to the Star Trek franchise. In 2014, the convention expanded its focus to include other space opera franchises such as Star Wars, Battlestar Galactica, Firefly and Babylon 5. In 2017, Treklanta returned to its original focus on "All Star Trek, All the Time."

== First convention ==
TrekTrax Atlanta 2011 was held on Presidents Day Weekend, February 18–20, at the Holiday Inn Atlanta Perimeter in the northern Atlanta suburb of Chamblee. Guests included:

- Tim Russ, best known as "Tuvok" on Star Trek: Voyager
- Barbara March, best known as "Lursa," sister of B'Etor from the House of Duras, from Star Trek: The Next Generation
- Gwynyth Walsh, best known as "B'Etor," sister of Lursa from the House of Duras, from Star Trek: The Next Generation
- Ken Feinberg, who played the Alien Captain in the Star Trek: Enterprise episode "Horizon"
- Diana Botsford, co-author of the Star Trek: The Next Generation episode "Rascals"
- Andrew Greenberg, a roleplaying game designer who has worked on games for Star Trek: The Next Generation and Star Trek: Deep Space Nine
- Dr. Ina Rae Hark, author of Star Trek, a 2008 book in the BFI TV Classics series published by Palgrave Macmillan for the British Film Institute
- Larry Nemecek, author of The Star Trek: The Next Generation Companion, former managing editor of Communicator and current contributor to Titan/U.K.'s Star Trek magazine
- Emmett Plant, a writer, composer and producer who has produced over twenty Star Trek audiobooks for CBS/Paramount
- Dr. Brad Strickland, the author or co-author of five Star Trek Young Adult novels
- John Broughton, Michael Bednar and Holly Bednar from Starship Farragut, a Star Trek fan production based on the original series of Star Trek

TrekTrax Atlanta presented four concurrent tracks of programming: two dedicated to the Star Trek universe in general (Main Programming and "OmniTrek"), a third devoted to the Klingon Empire in particular ("Qo'Nos"), and a fourth specifically for costuming and makeup ("The Ready Room"). The convention also hosted three 24-hour gaming rooms, one each for role-playing games, board games and card games, as well as a VIP champagne reception, Q&A sessions and photo opportunities with the celebrity guests, a dealers room, con suite, costume contest, 24-hour video room, live performances by the New York Disco Villains, One Hard Night and Jennifer Teeter, a dance party in the hotel atrium, "Klingon Karaoke," and the 12th annual Miss Klingon Empire Beauty Pageant.

TrekTrax Atlanta 2011 attendance numbered 25 guests, 45 staff volunteers and 187 paid memberships for a total attendance of 257 persons.

== Second convention ==
TrekTrax Atlanta 2012 was held April 20–22 at the Holiday Inn Atlanta Perimeter in the northern Atlanta suburb of Chamblee. The convention was endorsed by the Klingon Assault Group International as the "National Klingon Konvention." Guests included:

- David Orange, best known as the "Sleepy Klingon" in Star Trek VI: The Undiscovered Country
- Morgan Gendel, author of the Star Trek: The Next Generation episodes "The Inner Light" (for which he won the Hugo Award) and "Starship Mine" and the Star Trek: Deep Space Nine episodes "The Passenger" and "Armageddon Game"
- Dr. Lawrence M. Schoen, author, publisher, psychologist, Klingon language expert and founder of the Klingon Language Institute who has published Klingon translations of Shakespeare's Hamlet and Much Ado About Nothing, as well as the Epic of Gilgamesh and the Tao Te Ching.
- Fan Guest of Honor Melissa Carter, a columnist for The Georgia Voice and The Huffington Post, member of the Atlanta Police Department GLBT Advisory Board, transplant survivor and a former co-host of the morning radio show The Bert Show on Q100 in Atlanta
- Cheralyn Lambeth, a professional costumer formerly with Paramount Production Services' Star Trek Earth Tour and Star Trek: The Experience
- Andrew Greenberg, a roleplaying game designer who has worked on games for Star Trek: The Next Generation and Star Trek: Deep Space Nine
- Emmett Plant, a writer, composer and producer who has produced over twenty Star Trek audiobooks for CBS/Paramount
- Michael Bednar and Michael Day from Starship Farragut, a Star Trek fan production based on the original series of Star Trek
- Chris Coleman, Doug Harper, Randall Landers, Bill MacKenzie and Sara MacKenzie from Project: Potemkin, a Star Trek fan production set shortly after Star Trek VI: The Undiscovered Country
- Jim Brucke, Renda Carr, Tim Carr and Keith Harris from Star Trek: Lexington, a Star Trek fan production set shortly after Star Trek IV: The Voyage Home
- The il Troubadore Klingon Music Project, a four-person musical troupe from Indianapolis, Indiana, that performs original Klingon music and presents its original production, "wa' Sad ram wa' ram je" (a Klingon Opera-Ballet) with belly dancers
- "Nerd rock bands" One Hard Night and the New York Disco Villains
- "Keela & Katkith," hosts of the popular "Klingon Karaoke"

TrekTrax Atlanta presented three and a half tracks of concurrent programming: one dedicated to the Star Trek universe in general ("Main Viewer"), a second devoted to the Klingon Empire in particular ("Qo'Nos"), a third specifically for costuming and makeup ("The Ready Room"), and a one-day track devoted to special guest-related events and fandom-related discussion panels ("OmniTrek"). The convention also hosted a 24-hour gaming room for role-playing, board and card games, as well as a VIP champagne reception, "Trekkies Got Talent!" talent show, dealers room, con suite, costume contest, 24-hour video room, live performances by il Troubadore, the New York Disco Villains and One Hard Night, "Klingon Karaoke," and the 13th annual Miss Klingon Empire Beauty Pageant. The convention also raised $200 for the Melissa Carter Transplant Fund and partnered with LifeSouth Community Blood Centers for a blood drive.

TrekTrax Atlanta 2012 attendance numbered 33 guests, 45 staff volunteers and 162 paid memberships for a total attendance of 240 persons.

== Third convention ==
TrekTrax Atlanta 2013 was held April 19–21 at the Holiday Inn Atlanta Perimeter in the northern Atlanta suburb of Chamblee. The convention presented a "Star Trek Fan Film Festival," hosted the USS Republic's 25th Anniversary Celebration and, for a second consecutive year, called itself the "National Klingon Konvention." Guests included:

- Manu Intiraymi, best known as "Icheb" in the last two seasons of Star Trek: Voyager
- Keith R. A. DeCandido, the prolific writer/editor of many Star Trek novels, novellas, short stories, comic books and eBooks
- Ken Feinberg, who played the Alien Captain in the Star Trek: Enterprise episode "Horizon"
- Dr. Lawrence M. Schoen, author, publisher, psychologist, Klingon language expert and founder of the Klingon Language Institute who has published Klingon translations of Shakespeare's Hamlet and Much Ado About Nothing, as well as the Epic of Gilgamesh and the Tao Te Ching.
- Emmett Plant, a writer, composer and producer who has produced over twenty Star Trek audiobooks for CBS/Paramount
- Renda Carr, Tim Carr, Doug Harper, Randall Landers, Bill MacKenzie, Sara MacKenzie and Christin Woods from Project: Potemkin, a Star Trek fan production set shortly after Star Trek VI: The Undiscovered Country
- Darren Hann, Tara Murphy and Joann Pelley from Star Trek: Reliant, a Star Trek fan production that takes place five years after the return of the USS Voyager to the Alpha Quadrant
- Michael Bednar, Michael Day and Donna Smith Parker from Starship Farragut, a Star Trek fan production based on the original series of Star Trek
- Andrea Columber, Toby Curfman, Dean Rogers, Jacob Stanford and Jerry Stanford from Star Trek: Valkyrie, a Star Trek fan production audio series set three months after the launch of the USS Enterprise NCC-1701-B
- The il Troubadore Klingon Music Project, a four-person musical troupe from Indianapolis, Indiana, that performs original Klingon music and presents its original production, "wa' Sad ram wa' ram je" (a Klingon Opera-Ballet) with belly dancers
- "Nerd rock band" Go, Robo! Go!
- "Keela & Katkith," hosts of the popular "Klingon Karaoke"
- "Moxie Magnus," an entertainer and stage performer who writes a humorous blog about Star Trek

TrekTrax Atlanta positioned its 2013 convention as "The Star Trek Fan Film Festival and the National Klingon Konvention." In addition to screening films and episodes from more than a half-dozen Star Trek fan productions, it also presented three tracks of programming, one each devoted to Star Trek in general, Klingons in particular and costuming and makeup together; a gaming room for role-playing, board and card games; VIP champagne reception; "Trekkies Got Talent!" talent show; live performances by il Troubadore (with belly dancers as Orion slave girls) and Go, Robo! Go!; "Klingon Karaoke;" a Star Trek Universe costume contest; dealers room; con suite; and the 14th annual Miss Klingon Empire Beauty Pageant. In addition, cast and crew members from Project: Potemkin, Star Trek: Reliant, Star Trek: Valkyrie and Star Trek: Phase II collaborated to film the Project: Potemkin vignette "Closing Time," released to the Internet on August 28, 2014.

TrekTrax Atlanta 2013 attendance numbered 43 guests and comps, 41 staff volunteers and 97 paid memberships for a total attendance of 181 persons.

== Fourth convention ==
TrekTrax Atlanta 2014 was held April 25–27 at the Atlanta Marriott Northwest at Galleria in the northwestern Atlanta neighborhood of Cumberland and included programming events and activities devoted to Star Trek, Star Wars, Battlestar Galactica and Firefly. Guests included:

- Felix Silla, who played Twiki in Buck Rogers in the 25th Century, the Ewok Retah in Return of the Jedi, Lucifer in the original Battlestar Galactica and a Talosian in the original Star Trek
- Arlene Martel, who played T'Pring in the original Star Trek episode "Amok Time," Adulteress 58 in the original Battlestar Galactica episode "The Long Patrol" and a Vulcan priestess in the Star Trek fan production Star Trek: Of Gods and Men
- Jeremy Roberts, who played Lt. Commander Dimitri Valtane in Star Trek VI: The Undiscovered Country and the Star Trek: Voyager episode "Flashback," and Meso'Clan in the Star Trek: Deep Space Nine episode "Hippocratic Oath"
- Keith R. A. DeCandido, the prolific writer/editor of many Star Trek and other sci-fi franchise novels, novellas, short stories, comic books and eBooks
- Renda Carr, Abby Evans, Randall Landers, Leslie Lewis and Christin Woods from Project: Potemkin, a Star Trek fan production set shortly after Star Trek VI: The Undiscovered Country
- Darren Hann, Rob LeDrew, Joann Pelley and Philippe René from Star Trek: Reliant, a Star Trek fan production that takes place five years after the return of the USS Voyager to the Alpha Quadrant
- Michael Bednar from Starship Farragut, a Star Trek fan production based on the original series of Star Trek
- John R. Sims from Exeter Trek, a Star Trek fan production based on the original series of Star Trek
- Dale Morton, Clay Sayre and Robert Withrow from Star Trek: Phase II, a Star Trek fan production based on the original series of Star Trek
- Puppeteer troupes Felt Nerdy and Death By Puppets
- Live bands Go, Robo! Go! and Hyperspace
- Local radio talk show host Dan Carroll and pop culture podcasters Earth Station One
- Local community theater group The Spirit of Broadway
- Betsy Goodrich, performing as her character "Danger Woman"

TrekTrax Atlanta 2014 presented two tracks of concurrent programming, one devoted to Star Trek and one devoted to all other space opera TV shows and movies; a gaming room for role-playing, board and card games; a VIP champagne reception; a video programming room that screened 62 fan films in a Star Trek Fan Film Festival; a dealers room and a con suite. Special events included an original puppet show based on Star Trek and Star Wars, a Broadway-style musical tribute to Star Wars called "The Skywalkers," a science fiction-themed costume contest and the 15th annual Miss Klingon Empire Beauty Pageant. In addition, cast and crew members from Project: Potemkin, Star Trek: Reliant, Starship Farragut and Star Trek: Phase II collaborated to film the Project: Potemkin vignette "Ladies Night Out," released to the Internet on September 20, 2015.

TrekTrax Atlanta 2014 attendance numbered 72 guests and comps, 40 staff volunteers and 134 paid memberships for a total attendance of 246 persons.

== Fifth convention ==
Treklanta 2015 (the first with the new name) was held April 24–26 at the Atlanta Marriott Century Center in northeast Atlanta and included programming events and activities devoted to Star Trek, Star Wars, Battlestar Galactica, Babylon 5 and Firefly. Guests included:

- Sean Kenney, best known for his roles in the original Star Trek series as the crippled Captain Christopher Pike in the two-part episode "The Menagerie" and as Lieutenant DePaul in "Arena" and "A Taste of Armageddon"
- Jason Carter, best known for his role as Ranger Marcus Cole on the science fiction television series Babylon 5
- Anne Lockhart, best known for her role as Lieutenant Sheba on the original science fiction television series Battlestar Galactica
- Keith R. A. DeCandido, the prolific writer/editor of many Star Trek and other sci-fi franchise novels, novellas, short stories, comic books and eBooks
- Alec Peters, the creator, executive producer, co-writer and co-star of Prelude to Axanar, a Star Trek fan production
- Renda Carr, Randall Landers, Leslie Lewis, Aaron Renfroe, Matthew Trammell and Christin Woods from Project: Potemkin, a Star Trek fan production set shortly after Star Trek VI: The Undiscovered Country
- Darren Hann, Karen Hann, Rob LeDrew and Joann Pelley from Star Trek: Reliant, a Star Trek fan production that takes place five years after the return of the USS Voyager to the Alpha Quadrant
- Clay Sayre and Troy Bernier from the Star Trek: New Voyages episode "Mind-Sifter," a Star Trek fan production based on the original series of Star Trek
- Jacob Stanford, Jerry Stanford and Spring Stanford from Star Trek: Valkyrie and Star Trek: Ranger, two Star Trek fan production audio series set between the events of Star Trek VI: The Undiscovered Country and Star Trek: The Next Generation
- Stand-up comedians Eric Daugherty, Bobbin Wages and Ellaree Yeagley
- Puppeteer troupe Felt Nerdy
- Live band Hyperspace
- Artists Justin Anderson, Katie Bracewell, Jaeme Case, Daniel "DTM" Flores, Peter Lücker, Carly Strickland, Dimitri Walker and Joseph R. Wheeler III

Treklanta 2015 presented two tracks of concurrent programming, one devoted to Star Trek and one devoted to all other space opera TV shows and movies; a video programming room that screened 26 fan films released during 2014 in a Star Trek Fan Film Festival; a gaming room for role-playing, board and card games; an artists alley; a VIP champagne reception; a dealers room and a con suite. Special events included an original puppet show based on Star Trek, a science fiction-themed costume contest, the 16th annual Miss Klingon Empire Beauty Pageant and the first annual Independent Star Trek Fan Film Awards. In addition, cast and crew members from Project: Potemkin, Star Trek: Reliant, Star Trek: Valkyrie and Star Trek: Phase II collaborated to film the Project: Potemkin vignette "Room Service," released to the Internet on October 24, 2016.

Treklanta 2015 attendance numbered 60 guests and comps, 45 staff volunteers and 193 paid memberships for a total attendance of 298 persons.

== Sixth convention ==
Treklanta 2016 was held April 15–17 at the DoubleTree by Hilton Atlanta Northlake in Tucker, Georgia, and included programming events and activities devoted to Star Trek, Star Wars, Battlestar Galactica and Firefly. Guests included:

- Carel Struycken, best known to Star Trek fans as Mr. Homn, Lwaxana Troi's assistant and valet, in Star Trek: The Next Generation and as Lurch in The Addams Family, Addams Family Values and Addams Family Reunion motion pictures
- Tracee Lee Cocco, an actress, model and stuntwoman most visibly seen as Lieutenant Jae, a regular background character, on Star Trek: The Next Generation and in the feature films Star Trek Generations, Star Trek: First Contact and Star Trek: Insurrection
- Jack Stauffer, best known to science fiction fans as Lieutenant Bojay in the original Battlestar Galactica television series
- John and Bjo Trimble, best known to Star Trek fans for their letter-writing campaigns to "Save Star Trek" (which persuaded NBC to renew the series for a third season in 1968) and to rename the NASA space orbiter from USS Constitution to USS Enterprise in 1976, as well as Mrs. Trimble's best-selling reference book, the Star Trek Concordance
- Keith R. A. DeCandido, the prolific writer/editor of many Star Trek and other sci-fi franchise novels, novellas, short stories, comic books and eBooks
- Alec Peters, the creator, executive producer, co-writer and co-star of Prelude to Axanar, a Star Trek fan production
- Vincent Barnett, the creator and executive producer of Scienstars, an educational sci-fi series for the young and young at heart
- Troy Bernier, an actor in the Star Trek: New Voyages episode "Mind-Sifter" and co-founder of the Miami International Science Fiction Film Festival
- Jeff Carroll, a writer and filmmaker pioneering what he calls "hip hop horror, sci-fi and fantasy"
- Jevocas "Java" Green, an actor, author, filmmaker, makeup artist and creator, producer and titular star of the YouTube web series Doctor Who: The Forgotten Doctor
- Lynn McArthur, an actress, model and entertainer best known as Detective Abbey West in Atlanta Homicide (later renamed Atlanta Investigations: HD), Trixie in Lumber Baron of Jasper County and Kellie Callahan in Swamp Murders, as well as playing herself on Celebrity Wife Swap with Corey Feldman
- Clay Sayre from the Star Trek: New Voyages episode "Mind-Sifter," a Star Trek fan production based on the original series of Star Trek
- R. Alan Siler, author of Doctor Who's Greatest Hits: An Unauthorized Guide to the Best Stories From Time and Space and a contributing author to More Doctor Who and Philosophy: Regeneration Time
- The Atlanta Radio Theatre Company, which produces and performs original and adapted live audio dramas
- Captain's Log, an improv comedy group
- Stand-up comedian Eric Daugherty
- "Dirty Harry" (a.k.a. Hendry Betts III), host of Dirty Harry's Karaoke Cantina
- Puppeteer troupe Felt Nerdy
- Live band Hyperspace
- Artists Justin Anderson, Gillian Parker, Malik Roberts, Scott Rorie and Dimitri Walker
- Authors Michael Lackey, Louis Puster III and Winfield H. Strock III

Treklanta 2016 presented two tracks of concurrent programming, one devoted to Star Trek and one devoted to all other space opera TV shows and movies; a video programming room that screened 30 fan films released during 2015 in a Star Trek Fan Film Festival; a gaming room for role-playing, board and card games; an artists alley; an authors alley; a VIP champagne reception; a dealers room; autographs and portrait photo opps with the celebrity guests; and a con suite. Special events included an original puppet show based on Star Trek, a science fiction-themed costume contest, the 17th annual Miss Klingon Empire Beauty Pageant and the second annual Independent Star Trek Fan Film Awards.

Treklanta 2016 attendance numbered 70 guests and comps, 45 staff volunteers and 185 paid memberships for a total attendance of exactly 300 persons.

== Seventh convention ==
Treklanta 2017 was held April 28–30 at the DoubleTree by Hilton Atlanta Northlake in Tucker, Georgia, and included two full tracks of programming devoted to Star Trek. Marquee guests included:

- David Gerrold, best known to Star Trek fans as the author of the original series episode "The Trouble with Tribbles;" its sequel, the animated series episode "More Tribbles, More Troubles;" and the nonfiction books The World of Star Trek, a behind-the-scenes reference and interview book, and The Trouble with Tribbles, detailing his experiences in the production of that episode
- Gary Graham, best known to Star Trek fans as the Ocampa Tanis in the Star Trek: Voyager episode "Cold Fire," the Vulcan ambassador Soval in eleven episodes of Star Trek: Enterprise and the independent Star Trek fan film Prelude to Axanar, and as Ragnar in the fan films Star Trek: Of Gods and Men and Star Trek: Renegades
- J. G. Hertzler, best known to Star Trek fans as Martok, whom he played for four seasons on Star Trek: Deep Space Nine
- James Horan, who played five different characters in ten different episodes of Star Trek: The Next Generation, Star Trek: Deep Space Nine, Star Trek: Voyager and Star Trek: Enterprise
- Scott L. Schwartz, who played three different characters in four different episodes of Star Trek: Deep Space Nine, Star Trek: Voyager and Star Trek: Enterprise

Featured Guests included:

- John Caballero from the Star Trek fan film Star Trek: Horizon
- Joe Cepeda, creator, executive producer and star of the Star Trek fan film web series Star Trek Natures Hunger
- Mike Faber and Mike Gordon, co-hosts of the Earth Station One podcast that celebrates all things pop culture, sci-fi and fantasy, comics and more
- Matt Green and Scott Lyttle from the Star Trek fan film web series Star Trek: First Frontier
- Michael L. King, creator, executive producer and star of the Star Trek fan film web series Starship Valiant
- Dr. Larry Krumenaker, a longtime astronomy and science writer, as well as an educator and former astronomer
- Mark McCray, author of The Best Saturdays of Our Lives, a book that chronicles the origins of competitive Saturday morning cartoons
- Kevin C. Neece, author of The Gospel According to Star Trek: The Original Crew and The Gospel According to Star Trek: The Next Generation
- Leslie E. Owen, a literary agent, writer, journalist and teacher
- Da'Neille Roy, Greg Teft, Ray Tesi and Jim Von Dolteren from the Star Trek fan film web series Starship Republic
- Christopher Tevebaugh, director and co-writer of the documentary Our Star Trek: The Fifty Year Mission
- Adam Throne, an Atlanta-based educator, writer and editor
- Glen L. Wolfe, who has written, directed, produced and/or acted in eleven different Star Trek fan films, including episodes of The Federation Files, Star Trek: New Voyages and Star Trek Continues

Featured Performers included:

- Hendry Betts III (a.k.a. "Dirty Harry"), host of Dirty Harry's Karaoke Cantina
- Charles and Veronica Bramlett, a.k.a. the puppeteer troupe Felt Nerdy
- Nick Edelstein, an award-winning multi-instrumentalist and performing and recording artist
- Hannah Hoyt (a.k.a. "Konora the Klingon"), a classically trained opera singer who performs "Klingon opera"

Guest Artists included:

- Missy Ben-Yehoshua, Tamara Comstock, Abby Hermes, Betty Liao, Carly Strickland, Sarah Wade, Dimitri Walker and Katie Whatley

Treklanta 2017 presented two tracks of concurrent programming, both devoted to "All Things Star Trek;" an independent Star Trek Fan Film Festival which screened 33 fan films released during 2016; a gaming room for role-playing, board and card games; an artists alley; a dealers room; autographs and portrait photo opps with the celebrity guests; and a con suite. Special events included a VIP champagne reception; an original puppet show based on Star Trek, the 18th annual Miss Klingon Empire Beauty Pageant and the third annual Independent Star Trek Fan Film Awards.

Treklanta 2017 attendance numbered 70 guests and comps, 50 staff volunteers and 200 paid memberships for a total attendance of exactly 320 persons.

== Eighth convention ==
Treklanta 2018 was held on Memorial Day Weekend, May 25–27, at the Atlanta Marriott Century Center in northeast Atlanta. The convention hosted the 2018 Klingon Assault Group General Assembly and included three full tracks of programming devoted to Star Trek. Marquee guests included:

- Conrad Coates, best known to Star Trek fans as Admiral Terral in four episodes of Star Trek: Discovery, in his first-ever convention appearance
- Gary Graham, best known to Star Trek fans as the Vulcan ambassador Soval in eleven episodes of Star Trek: Enterprise and the independent Star Trek fan film Prelude to Axanar, as the Ocampa Tanis in the Star Trek: Voyager episode "Cold Fire," and as Ragnar in the independent Star Trek fan films Star Trek: Of Gods and Men and Star Trek: Renegades
- Robert Duncan McNeill, best known to Star Trek fans as Lt. Tom Paris on all seven seasons of Star Trek: Voyager
- Robert O'Reilly, best known to Star Trek fans as Gowron, whom he played in four episodes of Star Trek: The Next Generation and seven episodes of Star Trek: Deep Space Nine
- David R. George III, the New York Times and USA Today bestselling author who co-wrote the first-season Star Trek: Voyager episode "Prime Factors" and the author of 18 Star Trek novels and 18 articles for Star Trek Magazine

Featured Guests included:

- Fan Guest of Honor John Halvorson, founder and first "Thought Admiral" of the Klingon Assault Group
- Ann Elliott Drew, Lee Drew, Randall Landers, Leslie Lewis and Christin Woods, all of whom have played numerous roles both in front of and behind the camera of various Star Trek fan film series, including Project: Potemkin, Battlecruiser Kupok, Starship Deimos, Starship Endeavor, Starship Tristan and Starship Triton
- Brian Holloway, Special F/X Make-Up Supervisor and Makeup Department Supervisor for and occasional actor in Star Trek: New Voyages
- Mark McCray, author of The Best Saturdays of Our Lives, a book that chronicles the origins of competitive Saturday morning cartoons
- Mark Naccarato, executive producer of the upcoming Star Trek fan film The Romulan War
- Greg Teft, who plays Captain DaSilva in the Star Trek fan film web series Starship Republic
- Adam Throne, an Atlanta-based educator, writer and editor
- Glen L. Wolfe, who has written, directed, produced and/or acted in eleven different Star Trek fan films, including episodes of The Federation Files, Star Trek: New Voyages and Star Trek Continues

Featured Performers included:

- Hendry Betts III (a.k.a. "Dirty Harry"), host of Dirty Harry's Karaoke Cantina
- Charles and Veronica Bramlett, a.k.a. the puppeteer troupe Felt Nerdy
- Nick Edelstein, an award-winning multi-instrumentalist and performing and recording artist
- Stand-up comedians Jake Brannon, Eric Daugherty, Madeline Evans, Katie Hughes and Michael Rowland

Guest Artists included:

- Missy Ben-Yehoshua, Megan Johnson, April Leigh, Paul Maitland, Scott Rorie, Sarah Wade and Dimitri Walker

Treklanta 2018 presented three tracks of concurrent programming, two devoted to "All Things Star Trek" and one devoted to the Klingon Assault Group's 2018 General Assembly; the Treklanta Star Trek Fan Film Festival, which screened 58 fan films released during 2017; a gaming room for role-playing, board and card games; an artists alley; a dealers room; autographs and portrait photo opps with the celebrity guests; and a con suite. Special events included a VIP champagne reception; an original puppet show based on Star Trek, the 19th annual Miss Klingon Empire Beauty Pageant and the fourth annual Bjo Awards Ceremony (formerly the Independent Star Trek Fan Film Awards).

Treklanta 2018 attendance figures have not yet been released.

== Ninth convention ==
Treklanta 2019 was held on Memorial Day Weekend, May 24–26, at the Atlanta Marriott Buckhead Hotel & Conference Center. The convention hosted the 2019 STARFLEET International Region 2 Summit and included two full tracks of programming devoted to Star Trek and one full track devoted to the Region 2 Summit. Marquee guests included:

- Aron Eisenberg, best known to Star Trek fans as Nog in 47 episodes of Star Trek: Deep Space Nine and as Kar in one episode of Star Trek: Voyager
- Bill Blair, best known to Star Trek fans for playing various background aliens in 45 episodes of Star Trek: Deep Space Nine, two episodes of Star Trek: Voyager and four episodes of Star Trek: Enterprise
- Nichole McAuley, best known to Star Trek fans for playing various aliens and background characters in 25 episodes of Star Trek: Voyager and serving as a body double for Jeri Ryan
- David R. George III, the New York Times and USA Today bestselling author who co-wrote the first-season Star Trek: Voyager episode "Prime Factors" and the author of 18 Star Trek novels and 18 articles for Star Trek Magazine

Featured Guests included:

- Fan Guest of Honor Dan Toole, Commander STARFLEET of STARFLEET International
- Autumn Skye-Booth, a professional beauty pageant contestant, multiple titleholder, coach and certified Miss America Organization judge
- Paul Jenkins, a British comic book writer, screenwriter, novelist and narrative director who helped rewrite the original full-length Axanar script as the two 15-minute episodes that will eventually be filmed
- Randall Landers, the creator, executive producer and occasional actor in more than 70 episodes of various Star Trek fan film series, including Project: Potemkin, Battlecruiser Kupok, Starship Deimos, Starship Endeavor, Starship Tristan and Starship Triton
- Mark McCray, author of The Best Saturdays of Our Lives, a book that chronicles the origins of competitive Saturday morning cartoons
- Leslie E. Owen, an agent, editor and freelance writer who has moderated or participated in numerous Star Trek-related panel discussions at various conventions in Florida
- Greg Teft, who plays Captain DaSilva in the Star Trek fan film web series Starship Republic and engineering officer Timoteo Russo in the Star Trek fan film web series The Constar Chronicles
- Adam Throne, an Atlanta-based educator, writer and editor
- Glen L. Wolfe, who has written, directed, produced and/or acted in many different Star Trek fan films, including The Federation Files, Star Trek Continues, Star Trek: Equinox, Star Trek: New Voyages, Star Trek: Renegades, Star Trek: Secret Voyage, Star Trek: Temporal Anomaly and Starship Valiant

Featured Performers included:

- Captain's Log, an improv comedy group based in Atlanta composed of Bret Brammer, Cory DiMino, Eric Holden, Jim Rowbottom, Jen Thrasher and Byron Youngblood
- Hendry Betts III (a.k.a. "Dirty Harry"), host of Dirty Harry's Karaoke Cantina
- Charles and Veronica Bramlett, a.k.a. the puppeteer troupe Felt Nerdy

Guest Artists included:

- Lily M. Hurt, Megan Johnson, Sarah Jordan, April Leigh, Paul Maitland, Melinda Mercer and Dimitri Walker

Treklanta 2019 presented three tracks of concurrent programming, two devoted to "All Things Star Trek" (Main Programming, for events and activities featuring guests of honor and major events, and Auxiliary Programming, for fan-centered panel discussions, workshops and presentations) and one to host STARFLEET International's Region 2 Summit, an annual conference for members who reside in Georgia, Alabama, Mississippi, Florida and the Caribbean; the Treklanta Star Trek Fan Film Festival, which screened 42 fan films released during 2018; a gaming room for role-playing, board and card games; an artists alley; a dealers room; autographs and portrait photo opps with the celebrity guests; and a con suite. Special events included the STARFLEET International Region 2 Awards Banquet; a VIP champagne reception; an original puppet show based on Star Trek, the 20th annual Miss Klingon Empire Beauty Pageant and the fifth annual Bjo Awards Ceremony.

Treklanta 2019 attendance figures have not yet been released.

== Tenth convention ==
The tenth Treklanta convention was originally scheduled to be held May 1–3, 2020, at the Atlanta Marriott Buckhead Hotel & Conference Center. Confirmed and announced guests of honor were Suzie Plakson, Tim Storms, John Paladin and David R. George III. In early April 2020, the convention was indefinitely postponed due to the COVID-19 pandemic.

In June 2021, two years after Treklanta's last in-person convention, and with the COVID-19 pandemic still not under control, management announced that a one-day convention called "Treklanta on the Holodeck" would be held virtually in August, following a trend that had been established earlier in the year by other conventions not yet ready to hold in-person events.

Treklanta on the Holodeck was held on August 7, 2021, from 10:00 a.m. to 10:15 p.m. Eastern. It was a one-day event consisting of a series of one-hour programming events on the Google Meet platform. "Admission" to the event was free, but donations to Treklanta were solicited throughout the day. Treklanta Assistant Director Brian Holloway served as the event's master of ceremonies throughout the day. Programming events included:

- Opening ceremonies at 10:00 a.m. and closing ceremonies at 8:00 p.m., hosted by Brian Holloway
- A discussion panel at 11:00 a.m. about Star Trek fan clubs with representatives from STARFLEET International (SFI) and the Klingon Assault Group (KAG). Representing SFI was Vice Admiral Richard Sams from the United Kingdom, Admiral David Nottage from California and Vice Admiral Ryan Case from Mississippi. Representing KAG was Chris Lipscombe, Supreme Commander of KAG; Leila McMichael, Dark Star Quadrant Commander; and John Lars Shoberg, Phoenix Rising Squadron Commander.
- "How Star Trek: The Animated Series Influenced the Future Star Trek Franchises" at 12:00 noon, a prerecorded slideshow presented by Mark McCray, author of The Best Saturdays of Our Lives, and Dan Klink, co-host of the podcast "The Best Saturdays of Our Lives," followed by an open discussion
- A professional makeup and costuming panel presented by Brian Holloway at 1:00 p.m.
- A one-hour Q&A at 2:00 p.m. with prolific writer, columnist and author of many Star Trek novels, Keith R. A. DeCandido
- An all-new Star Trek puppet show at 3:00 p.m. by husband and wife puppeteer team Charles & Veronica Bramlett, a.k.a. Felt Nerdy, followed by a Q&A about puppeteering
- A one-hour Q&A at 4:00 p.m. with actor J. G. Hertzler, best known as Star Trek: Deep Space Nine's Klingon General Martok but also as "Prelude to Axanar"'s Capt. Samuel Travis
- An episode of the podcast Earth Station Trek at 5:00 p.m., hosted by R. Alan Siler, author of Star Trek's Greatest Hits: A Guide to the Best Episodes from the Final Frontier, with additional guests
- A one-hour Q&A at 6:00 p.m. with Tracee Lee Cocco, who appeared as Lt. Jae, an uncredited background character in dozens of Star Trek: The Next Generation (TNG) episodes and the first TNG movie, as well as many different aliens in TNG, Star Trek: Deep Space Nine and Star Trek: Voyager
- The Star Trek Fan Film Power Panel at 7:00 p.m., hosted by Fan Film Factor blogger Jonathan Lane, with his guests Joshua Michael Irwin, Vance Major, Mark Naccarato, Frank Parker, Jr., Greg Teft, Aaron Vanderkley and Glen L. Wolfe
- The world premiere of The Very Best of Star Trek Fan Films at 9:00 p.m., a 75-minute clip compilation video by Jonathan Lane that showcases the very best of independent Star Trek fan films over the past 15 years.

== Next convention ==
No date for the next in-person Treklanta convention has been set or even considered. The health and safety of its volunteer staff, guests, and attendees was the convention's top priority, and the next in-person convention was not to be held until the COVID-19 pandemic was under control and it was safe to do so. The 2020 convention was cancelled due to the pandemic, and a virtual convention was held in 2021 in its place. No in-person convention has been held since 2019, and as of 2026, the convention's official website has shown no updates in that time, suggesting the convention is currently inactive.
