= The 34th Rule =

1999 novel by Armin Shimerman and David R. George III

- The cover of The 34th Rule
- Author: Armin Shimerman; David R. George III
- Language: English
- Subject: Star Trek: Deep Space Nine
- Genre: Science fiction
- Publisher: Pocket Books
- Publication date: January 1, 1999
- Publication place: United States
- Pages: 288
- ISBN: 0-671-00793-9

The 34th Rule (ISBN 0-671-00793-9), published January 1, 1999, is a Star Trek: Deep Space Nine novel written by Armin Shimerman and David R. George III. The story in the novel was an allegory for the internment of Japanese Americans during the Second World War, and was inspired by George Takei's experiences during that period. It had originally been pitched as an episode to Deep Space Nine, but was subsequently turned into a novel.

== Plot ==
Quark is about to make an extraordinary deal, when he finds himself in the middle of a diplomatic crisis. Grand Nagus Zek is refusing to sell one of the lost Orbs of the Prophets back to Bajor. In response, the Bajoran government cuts off all diplomatic ties with the Ferengi and outlaws all Ferengi businesses within its borders. Quark first loses his bar, and then is subsequently imprisoned. But he finds himself to be the only one who can prevent a war between his people and Bajor.

== Development history ==
After Eric A. Stillwell and David R. George III successfully pitched to Star Trek: Voyager for the episode "Prime Factors", Stillwell and actor Armin Shimerman pitched ideas to Star Trek: Deep Space Nine. Although they were unsuccessful, when Stillwell and George were asked for stories for Star Trek comic books they went through a series of pitches they had previous proposed for Star Trek: Deep Space Nine and found a premise that Stillwell had based on George Takei's experiences of Japanese American internment during the Second World War. Shimerman suggested that a novel could be made of the idea but Stillwell was not interested and so Shimerman and George approached Pocket Books with the idea.

The majority of the book was written by George, who said that Shimerman simply agreed with most of what he wrote. The two worked together on plotting out the story, which was intended to be a deliberate allegory for the Japanese Americans internment. The title was a reference to the Ferengi Rules of Acquisition, with the 34th rule stating "War is good for business". After work was completed on The 34th Rule, George talked with another DS9 actor, Andrew Robinson, about a potential book project. This went on to become A Stitch in Time.
