= A Stitch in Time (Robinson novel) =

2000 Star Trek: Deep Space Nine novel by Andrew Robinson

- Cover
- Author: Andrew Robinson
- Cover artist: Sonia R. Hillios
- Language: English
- Series: Star Trek: Deep Space Nine
- Release number: 27
- Genre: Science fiction
- Publisher: Pocket Books
- Publication date: June 5, 2000
- Publication place: United States
- Media type: Print (paperback)
- Pages: 288
- ISBN: 0-671-03885-0
- OCLC: 44126199
- Preceded by: The Liberated

A Stitch in Time is a Star Trek: Deep Space Nine novel written by Andrew Robinson. The novel originated from a biography of Cardassian Elim Garak in the form of a diary which was written by Robinson after he landed the recurring role in the series. He would read extracts from it at Star Trek conventions for fans, and was heard by novelist David R. George III, who suggested he should submit it for publishing. Although it was announced that a sequel would be published in 2001, co-written by fellow actor Alexander Siddig, the only follow-up to the novel was Robinson's short story The Calling which was published as part of the Prophecy and Change anthology in 2003.

== Plot ==
Presented as a letter from DS9's resident Cardassian spy and tailor Elim Garak to Dr. Julian Bashir, Garak recounts his life story, and also notes developments on Cardassia after the end of the Dominion War. According to the text, Garak has since assisted in the rebuilding and recovery of Cardassia, while also supporting democratic reforms for its government. He believes that the Dominion War and destruction of Cardassia were partially caused by Cardassia's military-led government.

The narrative of the novel happens on Cardassia after the end of the Dominion War where Garak, living in the ruins of his childhood home, is helping with relief efforts while reminiscing about a society that is gone. As he is writing a letter to Bashir, he also goes over his own life through journal entries.

The first timeline follows him through his childhood in the home of Enabran Tain, being raised as the gardener's son with Mila as his birth mother, his training as a youth at a brutal military academy called Bamarren Institute for State Intelligence, his recruitment into the Obsidian Order, his rise through the ranks as a skilled operative carrying out various covert missions, his enmity with Gul Dukat and his disobedience of Enabran Tain over Palandine, a woman he loves, which leads to his downfall and exile.

The second timeline takes place on DS9, where he is preparing for his mission with Kira Nerys to join the Cardassian resistance under Damar.

== Development history ==
A Stitch in Time was written by Andrew Robinson, who portrayed Garak on Star Trek: Deep Space Nine. Robinson had originally been in contention to portray the character of Odo, and was down to the final three choices alongside Gerrit Graham and René Auberjonois, with the role going to Auberjonois. He was invited back to the series to audition once more to portray the last Cardassian on the station, Garak, for the second episode of the series. Garak went on to become a recurring character.

The novel itself originated from a biography of Garak, written by Robinson to flesh out the character, which he described as "an old actor's trick, if you're hired for a role that you're not familiar with, you write a biography of the character". The biography was written in the format of a diary, which Robinson would then read extracts from for fans at Star Trek conventions as he found that he was being asked similar questions at every convention and wanted to do something more for the fans.

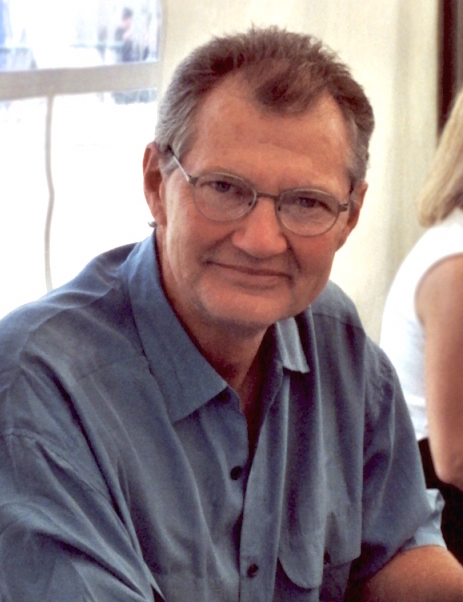
Andrew Robinson became the first Star Trek actor to publish a Star Trek novel without another writer with A Stitch in Time.

David R. George III had just completed the novel The 34th Rule with actor Armin Shimerman. George heard Robinson read from the biography at a Star Trek convention, and suggested that it would be suitable to be turned into a novel. Robinson submitted the proposal to the publishers of Star Trek novels and received a positive response, and so set about turning his biography of Garak into a full-length novel using The Star Trek Encyclopedia as a guide to ensure that references to other events within the Star Trek universe were correct.

He agreed an outline of the narrative within the novel with the publishers, and Margaret Clark was his editor at Pocket Books. One element he found he once again had to tone down was the sexual content of the novel, due to the family oriented market of the books. Robinson had previously deliberately portrayed Garak as sexually ambiguous in the television show, but found that the writers wrote the character out of situations where this would show.

Robinson has stated that one of the reasons he wrote the novel was to get "total closure" of the character, and compared Garak in the novel to the spies from the works of John le Carré such as Tinker Tailor Soldier Spy. He said of the novel:

I got out a lot of stuff I wanted to say about the character, and also about me. Because, basically, after a while there's that strange symbiotic relationship that happens between an actor and (a character). When you really love a role and you really get inside the skin of that role, that's what happens. And that happened with me and Garak.

The novel was half completed when Deep Space Nine finished after seven seasons. It was the first full-length novel written by Robinson, who had attempted to create works in this format previously but failed. It was written without the use of a ghost writer. It was numbered 27 in the original run of the Pocket Books Deep Space Nine novel series.

It was announced in 2000 that Robinson and actor Alexander Siddig, who portrayed Dr. Julian Bashir on Deep Space Nine, would write a sequel to A Stitch in Time due for publishing during 2001. However, no such sequel was subsequently published. Robinson had also said in an interview in 2002 that he had continued to write the Garak diaries following the conclusion of the novel, and suggested that they might become a new novel in the future. He was invited back to write a short story for the Deep Space Nine anniversary anthology Prophecy and Change (ISBN 0-7434-7073-7) in 2003. His story, The Calling, followed up on the events portrayed in A Stitch in Time. A Stitch in Time was re-released in 2010 in Germany with an alternative cover. An audiobook version narrated by Robinson was released on August 1, 2023.

== Reception ==
Paul Cole for the Sunday Mercury from Birmingham, UK, said of the novel: "It's a suitably ironic, oblique and at times obscure set of reminiscences as Robinson weaves together three different time-frames, held together with theme rather than an overall plot." Alvaro Zinos-Amaro for Reactor wrote: "A truly memorable read, and certainly a standout Star Trek novel. Exquisitely written, thoroughly imagined, by turns disturbing, moving, melancholy and hopeful [...]".

In 2015, John Bardinelli of Barnes & Noble highlighted the novel as among the best Star Trek novels. Gizmodo and /Film have also included the novel as one of the best Star Trek novels.
