= NGC 327 =

Spiral galaxy in the constellation Cetus

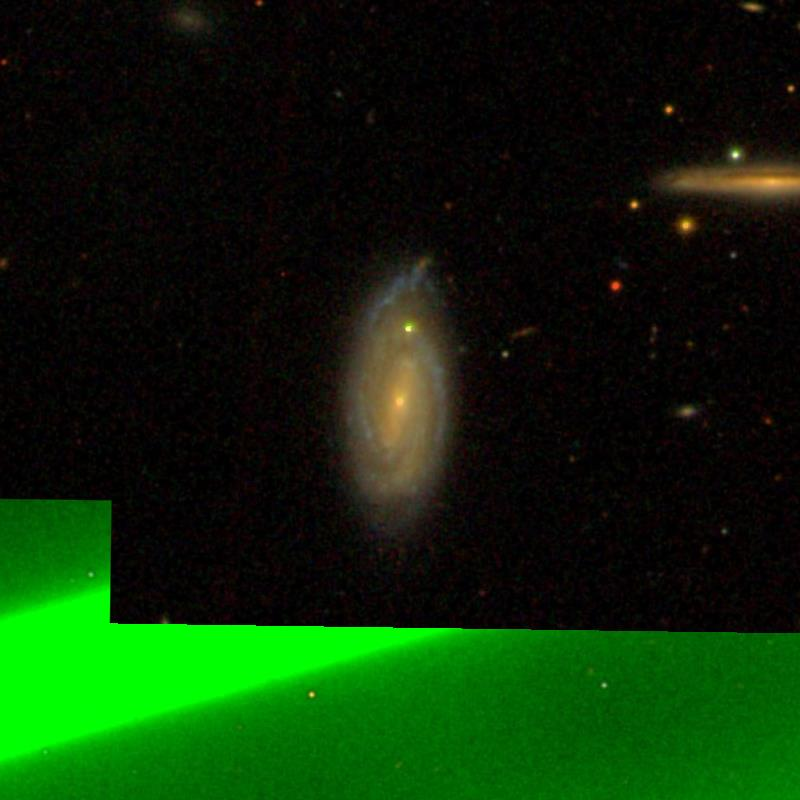
- SDSS image of NGC 327 (center) and NGC 325 (upper right)

Observation data (J2000 epoch)
- Constellation: Cetus
- Right ascension: 00^{h} 57^{m} 55.3^{s}
- Declination: −05° 07′ 50″
- Redshift: 0.018239
- Heliocentric radial velocity: 5,468 km/s
- Apparent magnitude (V): 14.5b

Characteristics
- Type: SBbc
- Apparent size (V): 1.6' × 0.7'

Other designations
- MCG -01-03-047, 2MASX J00575536-0507495, 2MASXi J0057553-050749, IRAS F0053-0524, 6dF J0057554-050750, PGC 3462.

NGC 327 is a spiral galaxy in the constellation Cetus. It was discovered on September 27, 1864 by Albert Marth. It is described by Dreyer as "faint, small, extended." It is nearby galaxies NGC 329, NGC 325 and NGC 321.

One supernova has been observed in NGC 327: SN 2021aclv (type Ia, mag. 17.3).

== See also ==
- List of NGC objects (1–1000)
