= Eric A. Stillwell =

American screenwriter

Eric A. Stillwell (born 1962) is a producer and writer who has worked on a number of television series, made-for-television movies, and motion pictures, including numerous Star Trek series and motion pictures.

== Early life ==
Stillwell was born in 1962 in the United States Civil Administration of the Ryukyu Islands. He graduated from the University of Oregon in 1985 with a bachelor's degree in political science.

== Production ==
Stillwell began work in the field in 1986 as a production assistant on Promise, a Hallmark television movie starring James Garner and James Woods that received five Emmy Awards, two Golden Globes, a Peabody Award, a Christopher Award and the Humanitas Prize.

In 1987, Stillwell moved to Los Angeles, where he served as production assistant and script coordinator for Star Trek: The Next Generation. He would serve as a production associate on Star Trek: Voyager and as script coordinator on Star Trek: Insurrection in 1998.

Stillwell went on to serve from 1999 to 2005 as Vice President of Operations for Piller², the production company created by Trek scriptwriter and producer Michael Piller. He also served as associate producer on USA's Dead Zone television series, as well as ABC Family's Wildfire series.

== Writing ==
Stillwell co-wrote the TNG episode "Yesterday's Enterprise," a fan favorite, in 1990, and briefly took a turn before the camera as a Klingon extra in 1991's Star Trek VI: The Undiscovered Country.

He co-wrote the 1995 Voyager episode "Prime Factors" with David R. George III in 1999, and collaborated with George and Armin Shimerman on the story upon which the 1999 DS9 novel The 34th Rule was based. In 2006, Stillwell was the head writer and associate producer on Nanna's Cottage and Monster Sunday School, two children's television series produced by Polara Productions in Eugene, Oregon.

== Trek fandom ==
Prior to the commencement of his career, from 1981 to 1984, Stillwell served as president of Starfleet: The International Star Trek Fan Association. During Stillwell's administration, he presided over structural reorganizations within the group, restored good relations with the Star Trek Welcommittee, and increased the group's visibility by publicizing with Starlog, Susan Sackett (Trek creator Gene Roddenberry's personal assistant), and notable fandom figure Bjo Trimble, leading its figures to swell toward 3,000 fans. Today, the Guinness Book of World Records recognizes Starfleet as the world's largest science fiction fan club.

Stillwell has participated in several "Cruise Trek" cruises.

== Later activities ==
Following the death of producer Michael Piller in 2005, Stillwell joined the FOX Broadcasting Company in the Alternative Entertainment department on shows including American Idol, So You Think You Can Dance, and The X Factor, as well as specials like the annual Teen Choice Awards, the American Country Awards, and the occasional Emmy broadcast. He later worked for the Walt Disney Corporation at Disney Consumer Products. Stillwell and his wife Debra are retired and currently reside in France.
