= Nanna's Cottage =

- Created by: Davey Porter; Karen Sponsler-Porter
- Starring: Rachael Rizzo; Greg Izay; Lauren Stone; Jason Booth; Gracie Porter; C.J. Walker; Carly Walker; Liza Clark; Lydia Hale
- Country of origin: United States

Production
- Running time: 30 minutes

Original release
- Network: Faith TV, TBN, Sky Angel Satellite Network, Smile of a Child, Australian Christian Channel
- Release: October 7, 2006 – November 10, 2007

Nanna's Cottage is a Christian children's television series created by husband and wife producing team Davey Porter and Karen Sponsler-Porter.

The series is about a 75-year-old grandmother Abigale "Nanna" Macaroon, a world traveler and archeologist, who gives away love and knowledge to her granddaughter and her friends about the world, and the importance of character. It featured adults, puppets and children, as well as regular guest characters. The television series was produced in Eugene, Oregon.

In 2020, Nanna's Cottage was featured in an edition of the Adult Swim webseries Bloodfeast.

== Episodes ==
The first season of 13 episodes was broadcast between October 7, 2006 and January 13, 2007. A second season was broadcast between April 7, 2007, and November 10, 2007.

Season 1

- Welcome to Cottage Hamlet
- Time Well Spent
- Happy Birthday, Arbuckle!
- The Great Cottage Hamlet Mystery
- Rushin' There and Russian Here
- Tick Tock Travelers
- Everyone's A Winner
- Bookworms
- A Clean Sweep
- Music! Music! Music!
- Remember When?
- There's Never Enough Gus
- The Ones You Like the Best

Season 2

- Spring Has Sprung
- A Lazy Day
- A Really Busy Day
- Rosey's Friends
- Rosey's Cartoon Carnival
- Gus Fixes Everything
- Heather Horsetrotter

== Monster Sunday School ==
Monster Sunday School is a series of shorts seen on TBN, filling the commercial breaks of Nanna's Cottage, featuring a basic Bible story lesson involving puppet monsters, a la Sesame Street. The shorts are generally two minutes in length, with three featured per episode. Nanna's Cottage's Marvin and Little Harry also appear. The shorts began airing with TBN's broadcast of Nanna's Cottage on October 7, 2006.

== Cast ==
- Rachael Rizzo as Nanna
- Greg Izay as Gardener Gus (Absent: Tick Tock Travelers, A Clean Sweep and Rushin' There and Russian Here)
- Lauren Stone as Aunt Trudy (Episodes: Tick Tock Travelers, Episode: Welcome to Cottage Hamlet, The Great Cottage Hamlet Mystery, Bookworms, Music! Music! Music!)
- Gracie Porter as Rosey Smartidoodle (Episodes: Tick Tock Travelers, Welcome to Cottage Hamlet, A Lazy Day, A Really Busy Day, Happy Birthday, Arbuckle!, Rosey's Friends, Bookworms, Music! Music! Music!, A Clean Sweep, Rushin' There and Russian Here)
- C.J. Walker as Danny (Episodes: Tick Tock Travelers, Heather Horsetrotter, Welcome to Cottage Hamlet, A Lazy Day, A Really Busy Day, Happy Birthday, Arbuckle!, The Great Cottage Hamlet Mystery, Rosey's Friends, Bookworms, Music! Music! Music!, A Clean Sweep, Rushin' There and Russian Here)
- Liza Clark as Heather Horsetrotter (Episodes: Tick Tock Travelers, Heather Horsetrotter, Welcome to Cottage Hamlet, A Really Busy Day, Happy Birthday, Arbuckle!, The Great Cottage Hamlet Mystery, Rosey's Friends, Bookworms, Music! Music! Music!, A Clean Sweep, Rushin' There and Russian Here)
- Lydia Hale as Fu Cheng (Episodes: Heather Horsetrotter, Welcome to Cottage Hamlet, Happy Birthday, Arbuckle!, Bookworms, Music! Music! Music!)
- Spencer Hansen as Sasha Playnowski (Episodes: Heather Horsetrotter, Bookworms, Rushin' There and Russian Here)
- Gaylord Walker as Larry Letterleaver (Episodes: Tick Tock Travelers, Time Well Spent) / The Moon Dudes (Episode: Welcome to Cottage Hamlet) / Gilbert Gadgetseller (Episode: Time Well Spent) / Go Go Man (Episodes: Time Well Spent & Music! Music! Music!)/ The Moon Men (Episode: Music! Music! Music!) / Franklin Ticketaker & Arlo Cartonpacker (Episode: Rushin' There and Russian Here)
- Davey Porter as Mean Marvin Mister O Clock/Babylonian Boss (Episode: Tick Tock Travelers)
- Jason Booth as Arbuckle (Episodes: Tick Tock Travelers, Heather Horsetrotter, Welcome to Cottage Hamlet, Time Well Spent, Happy Birthday, Arbuckle!, The Great Cottage Hamlet Mystery, Bookworms, A Clean Sweep, Rushin' There and Russian Here) / Cousin Arby (Episode: Happy Birthday, Arbuckle!)/ Chip the Sweep, Prize Patrol Guy and Puppy Arbuckle (Episode: Music! Music! Music!)
- Bethany Smith as Bunny Hoppergrass (Episodes: Tick Tock Travelers, Welcome to Cottage Hamlet, A Really Busy Day, Happy Birthday, Arbuckle!, Bookworms, Music! Music! Music!, Rushin' There and Russian Here)
- Austen Reeder as Andy Puddlesplash (Episodes: Welcome to Cottage Hamlet, Bookworms, Music! Music! Music!)
- Carly Walker as Anna Belle Jingleheimer (Episodes: Welcome to Cottage Hamlet, A Really Busy Day, Happy Birthday, Arbuckle!, The Great Cottage Hamlet Mystery, Rosey's Friends, Bookworms, Music! Music! Music!, A Clean Sweep)
- Joy Doctor as Beatrice Bookshusher (Episode: Bookworms)
- Sal Collura as Babylonian Trainee (Episode: Tick Tock Travelers)
- Eric A. Stillwell as The Moon King (Episode: Welcome to Cottage Hamlet)/ King of the Moon Men (Episode: Music! Music! Music!)
- Dave Moppert as Little Harry (Episodes: Welcome to Cottage Hamlet, Time Well Spent, Happy Birthday, Arbuckle!, The Great Cottage Hamlet Mystery, Music! Music! Music!, A Clean Sweep, Rushin' There and Russian Here)
- Evan Kossow as Little Harry (Episode: A Really Busy Day)
- Don Moser as Benjamin Franklin (Episode: A Really Busy Day & Music! Music! Music!)
- Ben Taube as Operissimo (Episode: Music! Music! Music!)
- Ben Ballard as Christopher the Geography Boy (Episodes: Music! Music! Music!, Rushin' There and Russian Here)
- Peter Noriega as Senor Cocina (Episodes: Music! Music! Music!, Rushin' There and Russian Here (Credited as Pete Noriega))
- Savannah Booth as Lola Belle (Episode: Music! Music! Music!)
- Cameron Booth as Jimmy (Episode: Music! Music! Music!)
- Puppets by Pierre Gillette at Monsterpuppets

The Cottage Hamlet Kids (Episodes: Bookworms & A Clean Sweep)

- Sora Boyd
- Jake Hoffman
- Zachary Hoffman
- Callie Perlman
- Sam Perlman

== DVD releases ==
Some episodes of Nanna's Cottage have been released on DVD, from Digiview Entertainment.

== Stations ==
The series has been aired on other television channels in the United States and Canada, including Trinity Broadcasting Network.
