= Profile in Silver =

- The Twilight Zone segment
- Scene from "Profile in Silver"
- Episode no.: Season 1 Episode 20a
- Directed by: John Hancock
- Written by: J. Neil Schulman
- Original air date: March 7, 1986

Guest appearances
- Lane Smith as Dr. Joseph Fitzgerald; Andrew Robinson as John F. Kennedy; Louis Giambalvo as Ray Livingston; Barbara Baxley as Dr. Kate Wang; Jerry Hardin as Lyndon B. Johnson; Ken Hill as Presidential aide; Huck Liggett as Texan

Episode chronology
← Previous "Dead Run"	Next → "Button, Button"

"Profile in Silver" is the first segment of the twentieth episode of the first season of the 1985 revival of The Twilight Zone television series. In this segment, a time traveler interferes in the assassination of John F. Kennedy, and must find a way to repair the resulting damage to the timeline.

== Plot ==
In 1963, Dr. Joseph Fitzgerald has traveled back in time from the year 2172 and assumed the identity of an instructor at Harvard University. His mission is to record the assassination of John F. Kennedy, from whom he is descended. Fitzgerald is nervous about watching his own ancestor be murdered. Dr. Kate Wang, a colleague from his own time, rebukes him for carrying around a 1964 coin with Kennedy's image, but he implores her to let this minor infraction against time travel rules slide.

At the scene of the assassination, Fitzgerald impulsively shouts for the president to take cover. President Kennedy ducks, and the shot misses him. A grateful Kennedy invites Fitzgerald to stay at the White House. As Kennedy and his entourage return home, the president is notified that Nikita Khrushchev has been assassinated and Soviet troops have captured West Berlin.

Fitzgerald consults his wrist computer, which informs him that his alteration of history has caused massive rips in the fabric of time. The assassination of Khrushchev was not enough to fix the damage; all possible outcomes to this timeline involve war between the superpowers. The only way to repair the timeline is for Kennedy to die in the exact manner as history recorded.

The president's Secret Service bodyguard, Ray, has grown suspicious of Fitzgerald after finding his 1964 coin and examining his camera, the shell of which is an unknown alloy that cannot be opened. Kennedy summons Fitzgerald, who tells them the whole story, showing a holographic display from the camera as partial proof. Kennedy volunteers to go back and be assassinated in order to repair the timeline. Fitzgerald, overwhelmed by his ancestor's heroism, removes his Harvard school ring, which is actually his time travel device, and places it on Kennedy's hand. Kennedy is transported to Fitzgerald's home, in 2172. Fitzgerald takes Kennedy's place in the Dallas motorcade.

At Parkland Memorial Hospital in Dallas, the dead body of "President Kennedy" (actually Fitzgerald) is attended to by Dr. Wang. Ray recognizes her ring because it is identical to Fitzgerald's. She tells him she knew what Fitzgerald's fate would be, since even actions committed during time travel become part of history, but could not let him know.

At Harvard University in 2172, John F. Kennedy delivers a speech to a classroom full of students, in which he implicitly lauds Fitzgerald's sacrifice and the sacrifices of other honorable men like him.

== Response ==
Starloggers.com ranks it as number two on its top 10 Twilight Zone episodes from the 1980s.

== See also ==
- Assassination of John F. Kennedy in popular culture
- 11/22/63
