= NGC 325 =

Galaxy located in the constellation Cetus

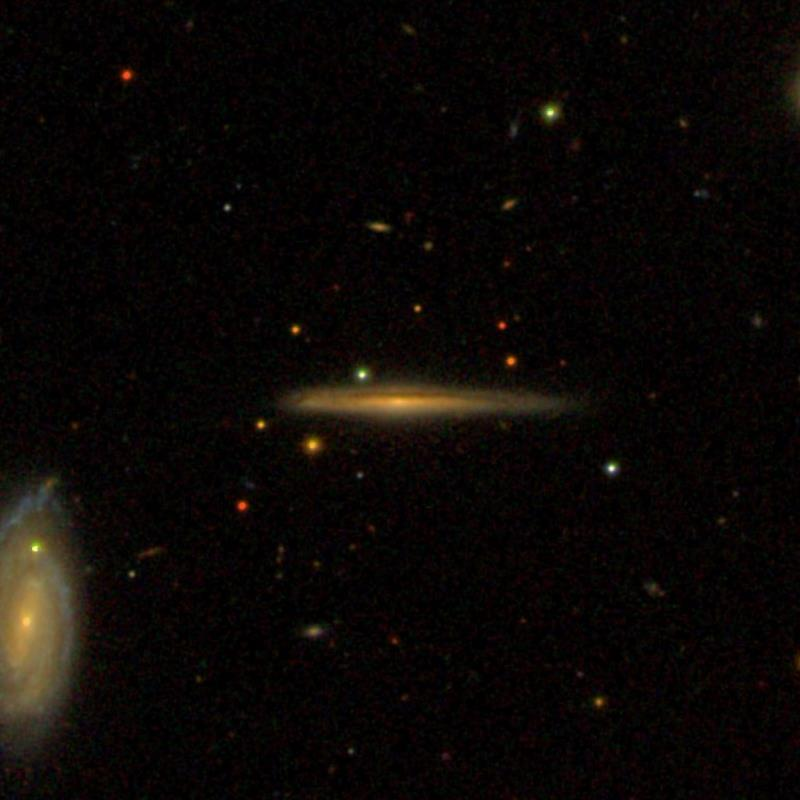
- SDSS image of NGC 325 (center) and NGC 327 (lower left)

Observation data (J2000 epoch)
- Constellation: Cetus
- Right ascension: 00^{h} 57^{m} 47.9^{s}
- Declination: −05° 06′ 43″
- Redshift: 0.018303
- Heliocentric radial velocity: 5,487 km/s
- Apparent magnitude (V): 15

Characteristics
- Type: Scd
- Apparent size (V): 1.57' × 0.21'

Other designations
- MCG -01-03-045, 2MASX J00574786-0506435, 2MASXi J0057478-050643, PGC 3454.

NGC 325 is a spiral galaxy located in the constellation Cetus. It was discovered on September 27, 1864, by Albert Marth. It was described by Dreyer as "very faint, very small".
