= Armin Shimerman =

American actor (born 1949)

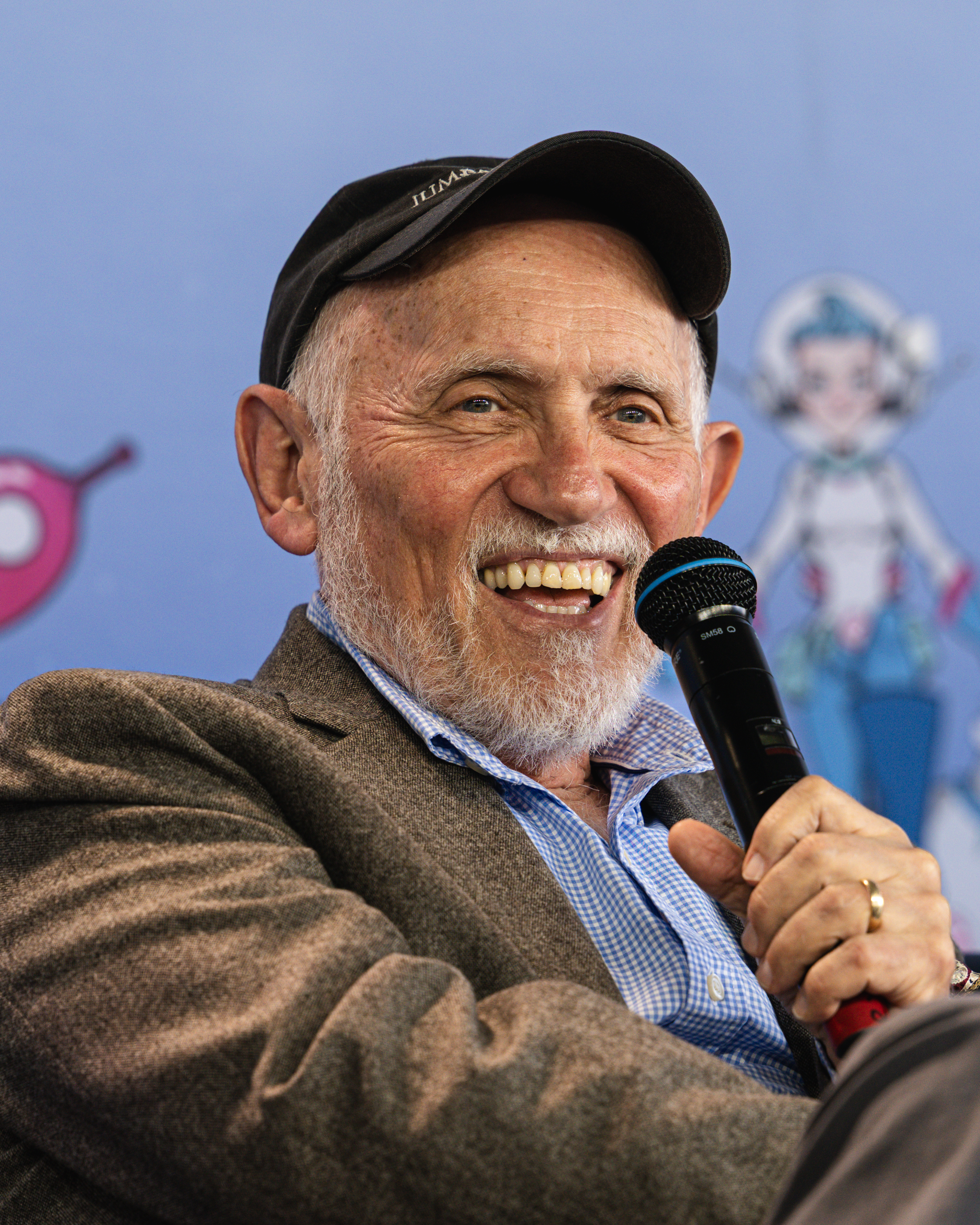
- Shimerman at GalaxyCon Nashville in 2026
- Born: November 5, 1949 (age 76); Lakewood, New Jersey, U.S.
- Education: UCLA
- Occupations: Actor; author; teacher
- Years active: 1979–present
- Spouse: Kitty Swink (m. 1981)

Armin Shimerman (born November 5, 1949) is an American actor who played Quark the Ferengi in the Star Trek franchise, appearing as the character in all seven seasons of Star Trek: Deep Space Nine (1993–1999). He also had a recurring role as Principal Snyder in the first three seasons of Buffy the Vampire Slayer (1997–1999), and voiced General Skarr and other characters in the animated series Evil Con Carne (2001–2004) and The Grim Adventures of Billy & Mandy (2001–2007), Doctor Nefarious in the Ratchet & Clank video game series, and Andrew Ryan in the BioShock video game series.

== Early life ==
Shimerman was born into a Jewish family in Lakewood, New Jersey, on November 5, 1949, the son of accountant Susan and house painter Herbert Shimerman. When he was 15, he moved with his family to Los Angeles, where his mother enrolled him in a drama group in an effort to expand his social circle. He attended Santa Monica High School and was active in drama. As a senior, he played leading roles in school productions of Hamlet, The Crucible, and The Skin of Our Teeth before graduating in 1967. After graduating from UCLA, he was selected to apprentice at the Old Globe Theater in San Diego. He began pursuing a career in theater and eventually moved to New York City, where he was a member of the Impossible Ragtime Theater. Returning to Los Angeles, he took roles in two CBS series to launch his television acting career.

== Career ==
=== Acting ===
==== Television ====
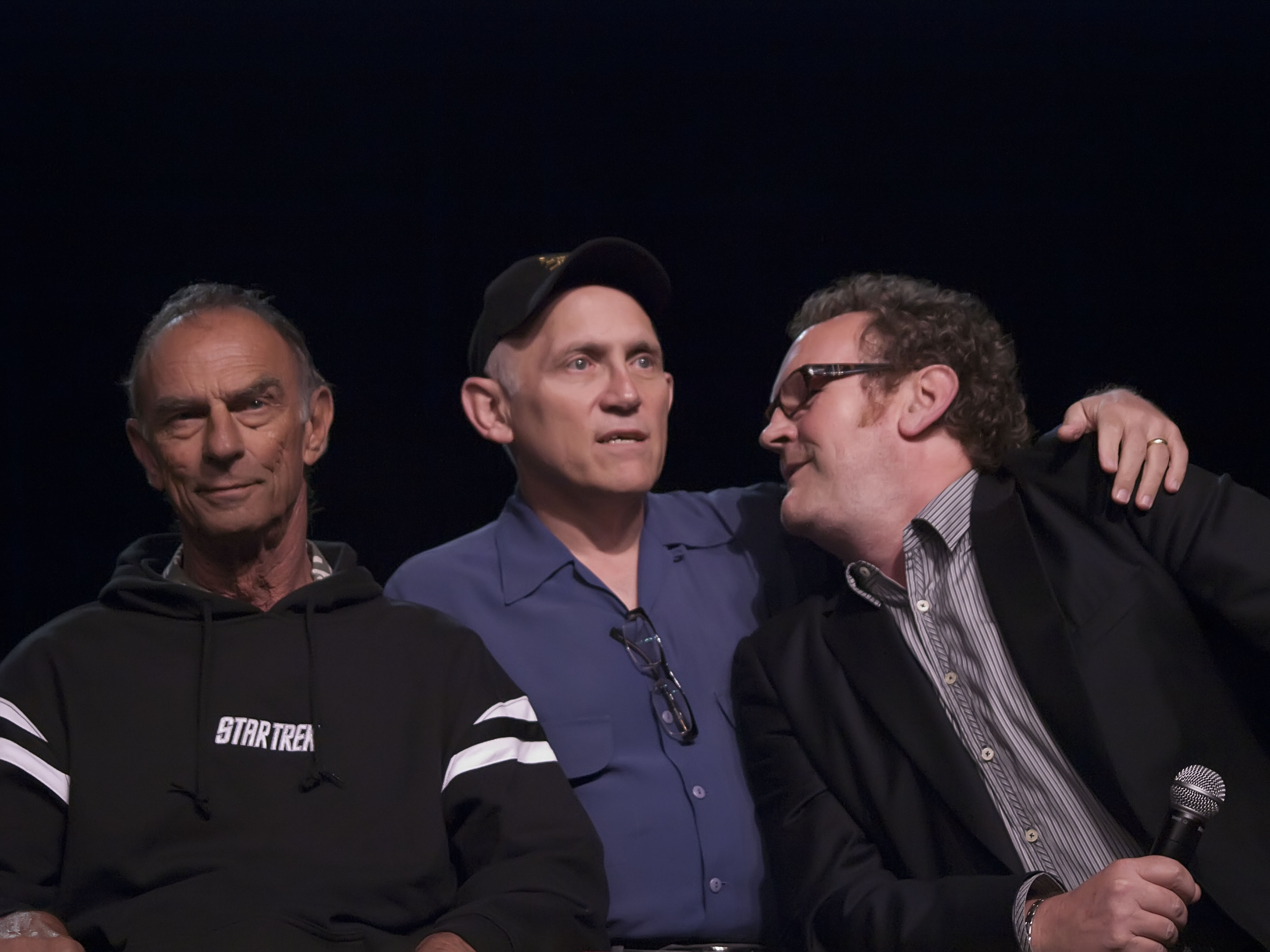
Shimerman (center) with Deep Space 9 co-stars Marc Alaimo (left) and Colm Meaney (right)

Shimerman played the Ferengi bar owner Quark in the long-running television series Star Trek: Deep Space Nine, though his involvement with the Star Trek franchise began with appearances as other Ferengi characters in the Star Trek: The Next Generation episodes "The Last Outpost" and "Peak Performance". Shimerman appeared several times on the cover of TV Guide, either with other actors or alone.

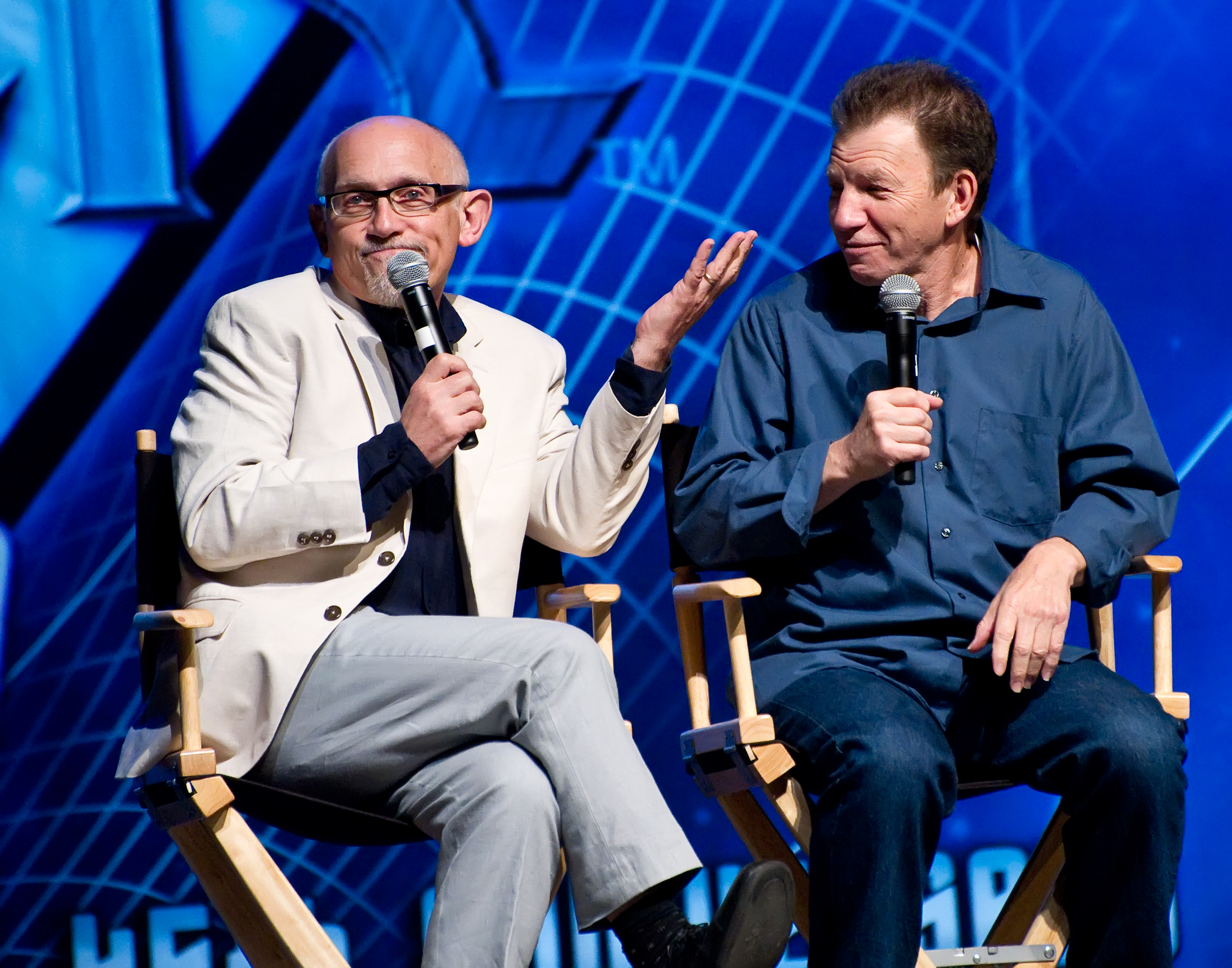
Shimerman (left) and Max Grodénchik (right) played the characters of two Ferengi brothers, Quark and Rom, on Deep Space 9

Along with Patrick Stewart, Marina Sirtis, Jonathan Frakes, and John de Lancie, Shimerman is one of only a few actors to play the same character on four or more different Star Trek series. He played Quark in Star Trek: The Next Generation, Star Trek: Deep Space Nine, Star Trek: Voyager, and Star Trek: Lower Decks. He reprised the role of Quark in the 1998 film Star Trek: Insurrection, but only in deleted scenes.

In addition to Star Trek, Shimerman has had roles as Pascal on Beauty and the Beast and as Principal Snyder in 19 episodes of Buffy the Vampire Slayer. He has also starred as Anteaus in Stargate SG-1 as one of the Nox, an evil wizard in Charmed, appeared as Stan the caddy in an episode of Seinfeld, and as Dr. Patemkin on Leverage.

Shimerman has appeared in the first seven episodes as Judge Brian Hooper in the third season of Boston Legal, joining fellow Star Trek actors William Shatner, René Auberjonois, and Ethan Phillips. His character even shared a scene with Auberjonois, with the strife between the two characters reminiscent of the conflict between Shimerman's Quark and Auberjonois's Odo.

He made an appearance as "The Terror" in the first Tick live-action series.

He appeared in the series Numb3rs episode "Provenance" as Patrick Holden. He had a small cameo in the episode "Posse Comitatus" of The West Wing as Richard the III and another in the film as an Old Man in the subway in What the Bleep Do We Know!?.

He has made appearances in various television series such as Babes as Mr. Ian Anderson, Married... with Children as Mr. Lovejoy, Warehouse 13 as Charlie Martin, Tremors as Cecil Carr, The Young and the Restless as Judge Graham Roberts, Castle as Benjamin Donnelly, Bad Samaritans as the Judge, and Red Bird as Max.

==== Voice work ====
He has voiced several video-game villains, including Toad and Zealot in X-Men Legends and X-Men Legends II: Rise of Apocalypse respectively, Andrew Ryan in the BioShock series, Razputin's father in Psychonauts, and General Skarr from Evil Con Carne and The Grim Adventures of Billy & Mandy. He then lent his voice talent to BioWare for their games Jade Empire (as Emperor Sun Hai, Abbot Song, and the Innkeeper) and Mass Effect (as the original Salarian Councilor and Fai Dan). He also voiced Dr. Emil Narud, Mohandar, and Dr. Emil Narud in its human form in the 2010 RTS video game StarCraft II: Wings of Liberty and the 2013 expansion StarCraft II: Heart of the Swarm, respectively.

He also voiced the role of Quark in various Deep Space Nine video games, such as Harbinger and the Fallen and reprised the role in the 2018 expansion Star Trek Online: Victory is Life.

He also voiced Ben Robbins and the Shopkeeper in the first two episodes of Rocket Power from 1999 to 2000.

In 2008, he voiced the character of Wilmer in an audio dramatization of The Maltese Falcon, which also featured actors Michael Madsen, Sandra Oh, and Edward Herrmann. In addition, he voiced the character of Mr. Phillips in Focus on the Family Radio Theatre's production of Anne of Green Gables. He also voiced Raanu along with the villager and a village leader in the straight-to-DVD animated film Bionicle: The Legend Reborn. He also voices Green Goblin in the action role-playing video game Marvel: Ultimate Alliance 2.

In 2011, he provided additional voices for the MMORPG Star Wars: The Old Republic.

In 2012, he also voiced Che Garcia Hansson and Old Joseph Cajiais for the MMORPG The Secret World.

His best known voice work is that of Doctor Nefarious in the Ratchet & Clank franchise, a role for which he received much praise.

He reprised his roles as Dr. Nefarious and Andrew Ryan and also voiced a Vox Populi enemy in the crossover fighting game PlayStation All-Stars Battle Royale.

==== Theatre ====
Shimerman appeared on Broadway in Joseph Papp's The Threepenny Opera, Saint Joan at Circle in the Square Theatre,I Remember Mama, and George Abbott's Broadway. He is a company member of the Antaeus Theatre Company in Los Angeles. His extensive regional theatre credits include performances with San Diego Repertory Theatre, The Old Globe, American Shakespeare Festival, Guthrie Theatre, Indiana Repertory Theatre, and the Geffen Playhouse.

=== Writing ===
==== Deep Space Nine ====
Shimerman co-authored a Star Trek: Deep Space Nine novel, The 34th Rule, with David R. George III, published January 1, 1999. It focuses on his character Quark, who loses his bar and is imprisoned during a diplomatic crisis between the Bajoran and Ferengi governments. The novel is an allegory for the internment of Japanese Americans during World War II.

==== The Merchant Prince series ====
Shimerman has co-written a series of books in which he provides a science-fictional basis for the life of John Dee. The first novel in the series, The Merchant Prince, was co-written with Irish author Michael Scott, known for his Nicholas Flamel series. Published in 2000, it features the historical figure John Dee being placed in suspended animation in 1575 by an alien race known as the Roc and awakening in 2099. The cover features Shimerman in Elizabethan garb. Shimerman commented: "John Dee really did exist. We're pretty sure he was a member of Queen Elizabeth's secret service, which put it in his purview to kill if he needed to. The Elizabethan period was a much more perilous time; you had to be quick with a dagger and nefarious in order to survive". Shimerman thought aspects of both himself and his Star Trek: Deep Space Nine character, Quark, were in the novel's interpretation of John Dee. Shimerman commented: "There are aspects of Quark similar to Dr. Dee, and undoubtedly there are aspects of Dr. Dee similar to Armin Shimerman, which would make him seem like Quark, as well".

The other novels in the series are Outrageous Fortune (2002), co-written with Chelsea Quinn Yarbro, known for her historical horror novels; and Capital Offense (2003).

In late 2020, Shimerman's new book, Illyria: Betrayal of Angels, was released by publisher Jumpmaster Press. Betrayal of Angels is the first book in Shimerman's trilogy about John Dee.

=== Teaching ===
Shimerman has been teaching Shakespeare for years, and as an adjunct professor for the University of Southern California. He also serves as Shakespeare scholar for productions in and around the Los Angeles area.

=== SAG-AFTRA ===
Shimerman has been extensively involved in the Screen Actors Guild (later, SAG-AFTRA) union that represents approximately 170,000 media professionals worldwide. His involvement included, without limitation, as a board member for several years, and the chair or co-chair of several committees.

== Personal life ==
Shimerman married actress Kitty Swink in May 1981.

== Filmography ==
=== Film ===
Year	Title	Role	Notes
1980	Stardust Memories	Eulogy Audience Member	
1986	The Hitcher	Interrogation Sergeant	
1986	Stoogemania	Larry II	
1987	Blind Date	French Waiter	
1987	The Verne Miller Story	Mortician	
1987	Like Father Like Son	Trigger's Dad	
1988	Dangerous Curves	Boggs	
1989	Big Man on Campus	Dr. Oberlander	
1989	Arena	Weezil	
1990	Death Warrant	Dr. Gottesman	
1991	And You Thought Your Parents Were Weird	Contest Judge	
1993	Slaughter of the Innocents	Dr. Mort Seger	
1994	Star Trek: Deep Space Nine: Behind the Scenes	Himself	Video documentary
1995	Dream Man	D.A. Van Horn	Video
1996	Eye for an Eye	Judge Arthur Younger	
1997	Snide and Prejudice	Eckart	
1997	Looking for Lola	Maitre'd	
1998	Star Trek: Insurrection	Quark	Deleted scenes
1999	The Auteur Theory	Detective Blank	
2001	Breathing Hard	Conrad	
2002	Who Slew Simon Thaddeus Mulberry Pew	The Whizzit	Short film
2003	Living in Walter's World	Mr. Krause	Short film
2004	What the Bleep Do We Know!?	Older Man (in subway)	Documentary, cameo
2004	Eviction	Landlord	Short film
2005	The Works	Gerald	
2005	Geppetto's Secret	Leonardo the Paintbrush	Voice
2006	What the Bleep!?: Down the Rabbit Hole	Old Man	Documentary
2007	FedCon XVI: Drone Heart	Himself	Documentary
2008	The Urn	Fiester	
2008	Delgo	Nohrin Merchant	Voice
2008	Insanitarium	Hawthorne	Direct-to-video
2009	Bionicle: The Legend Reborn	Raanu, Villager	Voice, direct-to-video
2010	The Man Who Knew How to Fly	Expert #1	Short film
2010	For Christ's Sake	The Pope	
2011	Atlas Shrugged: Part I	Dr. Potter	Credited as Armin Shimmerman
2011	The Captains		(special thanks)
2011	The Table	Himself	Video documentary
2012	Dropping Evil	CEO, "Boss Man"	
2012	Becky's the Boss	CEO, "Boss Man"	Short film
2012	The Rise of Gunhead	CEO, "Boss Man"	Short film
2012	Intelligence	Dr. Phineas White	Short film
2013	Space Opera Society Presents-Armin Shimerman	Himself	Short film
2013	The Best of Superman	Professor Milo	Voice, archival audio
2014	The Sublime and Beautiful	Lee Westin	
2015	Troilus & Cressida		(the producers wish to thank)
2016	Ratchet & Clank	Dr. Nefarious	Voice
2016	Diani & Devine Meet the Apocalypse	Thomas	
2017	Followed Back	Dr. Lane	Short film
2018	Porthole	Dr. Hans Meeker	
2018	5th Passenger	Myers	
2019	The Circuit: Star Crew	Actor	
2019	What We Left Behind: Star Trek DS9	Himself	Documentary
2019	Golden Boy	Cagan	
2020	Unbelievable!!!!!	Male Moesha	
2021	Ratchet & Clank: Life of Pie	Dr. Nefarious	Voice, short film
2022	The Assassin's Apprentice: Silbadores of the Canary Islands	Roy	Short film

=== Television ===
Year	Title	Role	Notes
1979	Woman at West Point	Maj. Logan	Television film, First role
1981	Bulba	Charles Medwick	Television film
1982	Hill Street Blues	Phone Man	Episode: "Heat Rash"
1983	Oh Madeline	Norman	Episode: "Chances Are"
1983	We Got It Made	Aldo Riviera	Episode: "Mickey's T-Shirt"
1984	Cagney & Lacey	Officer Green	Episode: "Matinee"
1984	The Paper Chase	Asphalt Expert Witness	Episode: "Tempest in a Pothole"
1984	Remington Steele	Nestor Bartholomew	Episode: "Lofty Steele"
1985	Alice	Man at Auction	Episode: "Kiss the Grill Goodbye"
1985	I Had Three Wives	Herb	Episode: "You and I Know"
1985	The Facts of Life	Mr. Smith	Episode: "Out of the Fire"
1986	It's Garry Shandling's Show	The Doctor	Episode: "Garry Throws a Surprise Party"
1986	You Again?	Jim	Episode: "The Grad"
1987	What's Happening Now!!	Frank	Episode: "Mad Money"
1987	Easy Street	Mr. Klinestabber	Episode: "Frames and Dames"
1987	Crime Story	Treasurer	Episode: "The Pinnacle"
1987	Baby Girl Scott	Mr. Taverner	Television film
1987	Sledge Hammer!	Malcolm Dench	Episode: "Hammeroid"
1987–1990	Beauty and the Beast	Pascal	16 episodes
1987–1994	Star Trek: The Next Generation	Quark, DaiMon Bractor, Gift-Box Face, Letek	4 episodes
1988	Tricks of the Trade	Criminal	Television film
1989	Hooperman	Dr. Wexler	Episode: "Nightmare in Apartment One"
1989	Duet	Dr. Jordan	Episode: "The New and Improved Linda"
1989, 1994	L.A. Law	Timothy Wiseboro, Ernie Frye	2 episodes
1990	Miracle Landing	Rick	Television film
1990	Grand	Dr. Kasmurski, Man at Funeral	2 episodes
1990	Who's the Boss?	Mr. Warner	Episode: "Road Scholar"
1990	Alien Nation	Cyril Roman	Episode: "Gimme, Gimme"
1990	Cop Rock	Mersky	Episode: "Pilot"
1990	Babes	Mr. Ian Anderson	Episode: "Temper, Temper"
1990	Good Grief	Stinky	Episode: "Cub Scouts and Horses & Whiskers on Kittens"
1991	Married... with Children	Mr. Lovejoy	Episode: "Buck the Stud"
1991	Pros and Cons	Harvey	Episode: "Fire and Ice"
1991–1992	Brooklyn Bridge	Bernard	4 episodes
1992	Civil Wars	Victor Sofransky	Episode: "Mob Psychology"
1992	Sci-Fi Buzz	Himself - Quark	Episode: "Armin Shimerman/David Brin"
1993	E!'s Inside Star Trek Special	Himself - Guest	Television special documentary
1993–1999	Star Trek: Deep Space Nine	Quark, Herbert Rossoff, Audrid Dax	172 episodes
1994	Journey's End: The Saga of Star Trek - The Next Generation	Himself	Television film documentary
1994	Not Just News	Himself	1 episode
1995	Star Trek: Voyager	Quark	Episode: "Caretaker"
1995–1996	Dumb and Dumber	Casab, Questioner #3, Varp	Voice, 2 episodes
1996	Seinfeld	Stan	Episode: "The Caddy"
1996	The Tonight Show with Jay Leno	Quark	1 episode
1996	The Lazarus Man	Henry Munroe	Episode: "Jehovah and Son, Inc."
1997	Space Cadets	Himself	Episode: "Quarks vs. Roms"
1997	Bruno the Kid	Additional voices	Voice, episode: "Who's There?" Credited as Arman Shimmerman
1997	Stargate SG-1	Anteaus	Episode: "The Nox"
1997	Ally McBeal	Judge Walworth	Episode: "Boy to the World"
1997–1998	The Practice	Judge Garth Moskin	2 episodes
1997–2000	Buffy the Vampire Slayer	Principal Snyder	19 episodes
1998	The Lost World	Professor George Edward Challenger	Television film
1998	Real Story	Thornfield	Television film
1999	Martial Law	Daniel Darius	Episode: "Slammo Blammo"
1999–2000	Rocket Power	Shopkeeper, Ben Robbins	Voice, 2 episodes
2001	Spotlight on Armin Shimerman and Kitty Swink	Himself	Television special
2001	Judging Amy	Anthony Cara	Episode: "The Undertow"
2001	Evil Con Carne	General Skarr, Stomach	Voice, television special
2001	The Invisible Man	Tommy Walker, Augustin Gaither	3 episodes
2001	The Guardian	Judge Smitrovich	Episode: "The Men from the Boys"
2001	Citizen Baines	Robert Udelwitz	Episode: "The Appraisal"
2001	The Agency	Dr. Oliver	Episode: "Nocturne"
2001	Weakest Link	Himself	Episode: "Star Trek Edition"
2001–2007	The Grim Adventures of Billy & Mandy	General Skarr, Stomach, additional voices	Voice, 23 episodes
2002	Teacher's Pet	Principal Nash Brickler	Voice, episode: "What's Sweat Got to Do with It?", scenes deleted
2002	The Tick	The Terror	Episode: "The Terror"
2002	Charmed	The Wizard	Episode: "We're Off to See the Wizard"
2002	Boston Public	Judge Semel	Episode: "Chapter Forty-Four"
2002	The West Wing	Richard III	Episode: "Posse Comitatus"
2002	For the People	Dr. O'Neill	2 episodes
2002	Thieves	Professor Conrad Haglar	Episode: "Home Is Where the Heist Is"
2002	Girls Club	Edmund Graves	3 episodes
2003	Tremors	Cecil Carr	Episode: "A Little Paranoia Among Friends"
2003	The Handler	Maxwell Rosenheim	2 episodes
2003–2004	Evil Con Carne	General Skarr, Stomach	Voice, 9 episodes
2004	Single Santa Seeks Mrs. Claus	Ernest	Television film
2004	Crossing Jordan	Dr. McCain	Episode: "Slam Dunk"
2004	ER	Levine	Episode: "Where There's Smoke"
2004	Nip/Tuck	Ocularist	Episode: "Natasha Charles"
2005	Committed	Super	Episode: "The Snow Episode"
2005	Justice League Unlimited	Professor Milo	Voice, episode: "The Doomsday Sanction", Credited as Armin Shimmerman
2005	Joan of Arcadia	Ronald Harbison	Episode: "Trial and Error"
2005	Invasion	Josh Breims	2 episodes
2005	Meet the Santas	Ernest	Television film
2005	Billy and Mandy Save Christmas	General Skarr	Voice, television film
2006	Seinfeld: Inside Look	Stan	Episode: "The Caddy" Archive footage
2006	Ben 10	Slix Vigma	Voice, episode: "Grudge Match"
2006	Dr. Vegas	Clown	Episode: "Heal thyself"
2006	Numb3rs	Patrick Holden	Episode: "Provenance"
2006	Boston Legal	Judge Brian Hooper	7 episodes
2006	South of Nowhere	Dr. Crawford	Episode: "That's the Way the World Crumbles"
2006	Dead and Deader	Coroner Flutie	Television film
2007	Billy & Mandy's Big Boogey Adventure	General Skarr	Voice, television film
2007	Billy & Mandy: Wrath of the Spider Queen	General Skarr	Voice, television film
2007	Star Trek: Beyond the Final Frontier	Himself - Interviewee	Television film documentary
2007	Star Trek New Voyages: Phase II		(special thanks)
2007	The Young and the Restless	Judge Graham Roberts	1 episode
2008	Underfist: Halloween Bash	General Skarr, Candy Skeleton, Rat	Voice, television special
2009	Leverage	Dr. Patemkin	Episode: "The Juror #6 Job"
2009	The Jace Hall Show	Himself	Episode: "Star Trek & Duke Nukem Forever"
2009–2010	Batman: The Brave and the Bold	Calculator, Psycho-Pirate, Mark Haley	Voice, 3 episodes, credited as Armin Shimmerman
2010	Proposition 8 Trial Re-Enactment	Claude Kolm	Television series documentary
2010	Warehouse 13	Charlie Martin	Episode: "Where and When"
2012	Sword of the Atom	Taren, Commander, Deraegis, Soldier	Voice, 3 episodes
2012	Perception	Dr. Cutler	Episode: "86'd"
2012	Castle	Benjamin Donnelly	Episode: "The Final Frontier"
2012–2013	DC Nation's Farm League	Aquamandrill, Crainiac, Moo Face	Voice, 2 episodes
2012–2016	Regular Show	Various voices	Voice, 8 episodes
2013	Bad Samaritans	Judge	2 episodes
2013	Tales of Metropolis	Brainiac	Voice, episode: "Bizarro"
2013	Super-Pets	Superman, Jokerfish	Voice, 2 episodes
2013	CSI: Crime Scene Investigation	Oscar	Episode: "Check In and Check Out"
2014	Nikki & Nora: The N&N Files	J. Hewitt Kemp	3 episodes
2014	Franklin & Bash	Stu Weston	Episode: "Falcon's Nest"
2016	The Exhilarating and Fashionable Life of Emmy Rose Knightley	Himself	Episode: "Pilot"
2016	Shakespeare in the Sphere		(special thanks)
2016	Red Bird	Max	2 episodes
2016	Inside the Extras Studio	Arthur Shinebaum	Episode: "Trekkie Cult Leader"
2016	50 Years of Star Trek	Himself	Television film documentary
2016	Timeless	David Rittenhouse	Episode: "The Capture of Benedict Arnold"
2016	Uncle Grandpa	Additional voices	Voice, episode: "The Phone Call"
2017	Lesser Known Love	General Skarr	Voice, archive audio, episode: "Evil Con Carne"
2017	Justice League Action	Zilius Zox	Voice, 2 episodes
2018	We Bare Bears	Additional voices	Voice, episode: "Best Bears"
2019	That Guy... Who Was in That Thing 3: Trek Stars	Himself	Television film
2019–2021	The 7th Rule	Himself	2 episodes
2019	The 7th Rule: Captain Nog Forever	Himself	1 episode
2020	The Actor's Choice	Himself	Episode: "Armin Shimerman & Marliyn Anderson"
2020	Alone Together: A DS9 Companion	Quark	Episode: "With Grace"
2021	The Rookie	Judge Paloma	Episode: "Consequences"
2022	Close Enough	Phil	Voice, episode: "Halloween Enough"
2022	Star Trek: Lower Decks	Quark	Voice, episode: "Hear All, Trust Nothing"

=== Podcast series ===
Year	Title	Role	Notes
2016	Buffering the Vampire Slayer	Himself - Guest	Episode: "An Interview with Armin Shimerman"
2021	Funny Science Fiction Podcast	Himself - Guest	Episode: "The Rules of Acquisition ft. Armin Shimerman"
2022	Sci-Fi Talk	Himself	Episode: "Armin Shimerman"
2023	"Shuttlepod Show"	Himself	Episode: "The House of Quark"

=== Video games ===
Year	Title	Role	Notes
1996	Star Trek: Deep Space Nine: Harbinger	Quark	Grouped under "Featuring the voices of"
1999	Star Trek: Deep Space Nine Companion	Quark	Archive audio
2000	Star Trek: Deep Space Nine: The Fallen	Quark	Grouped as "Voices"
2004	Onimusha 3: Demon Siege	Hideyoshi Hashiba	Voice
2004	X-Men Legends	Toad	Voice
2004	Ratchet & Clank: Up Your Arsenal	Dr. Nefarious	Voice
2004	World of Warcraft	Voice Over Cast	Voice
2005	Jade Empire	The Innkeeper, Abbot Song, Emperor Sun Hai	Voice, grouped under "Voice Actors", Also the Limited and the 2007 Special Editions of the Game
2005	Psychonauts	Augustus Aquato	Voice
2005	X-Men Legends II: Rise of Apocalypse	Toad, Zealot	Voice, credited as Armin Shimmerman
2005	Ratchet: Deadlocked	Dr. Nefarious	Voice
2006	Reservoir Dogs	Voice Actors	
2006	The Grim Adventures of Billy & Mandy	General Skarr	Voice
2006	Gothic 3	Additional voices	Voice
2006	Resistance: Fall of Man	Additional voices	Grouped under "Voice-Over Actors"
2007	God of War II	Translator 2	Voice, grouped under "Voice Actors"
2007	BioShock	Andrew Ryan	Voice
2007	Mass Effect	Additional voices	Voice
2008	Command & Conquer 3: Kane's Wrath	Voice Talent / Voice Actors	Voice
2008	Ratchet & Clank Future: Quest for Booty	Dr. Nefarious	Voice, credited as Armin Shimmerman
2009	Marvel: Ultimate Alliance 2	Green Goblin	Voice, grouped under "Voice Talent"
2009	Ratchet & Clank Future: A Crack in Time	Dr. Nefarious	Voice
2010	Mass Effect 2	Additional voices	Voice
2010	BioShock 2	Andrew Ryan	Voice
2010	StarCraft II: Wings of Liberty	Dr. Narud, Mohandar	Voice, grouped under "Additional Characters"
2010	BioShock 2: The Protector Trials	Andrew Ryan	Voice
2010	BioShock 2: Minerva's Den	Andrew Ryan	Voice
2011	Ratchet & Clank: All 4 One	Dr. Nefarious	Voice
2011	Star Wars: The Old Republic	Additional voices	Voice
2012	Mass Effect 3	Additional voices	Voice
2012	Diablo III	Additional voices	Voice
2012	The Secret World	Chief Garcia Hansson, Old Joseph Cajiais	Voice, grouped under "Cast"
2012	Ratchet & Clank Collection	Dr. Nefarious	Voice, archive audio
2012	World of Warcraft: Mists of Pandaria	Voice Over Cast	Voice
2012	PlayStation All-Stars Battle Royale	Dr. Nefarious, Andrew Ryan, Vox Populi	Voice, grouped under "Cast"
2013	StarCraft II: Heart of the Swarm	Dr. Emil Narud (Human Form)	Voice, grouped under "Supporting Cast"
2014	Diablo III: Reaper of Souls	Additional voices	Voice
2014	BioShock Infinite: Burial at Sea	Andrew Ryan	Voice, Episode 2 only
2016	Ratchet & Clank	Dr. Nefarious	Voice, credited as Armin Shimmerman
2016	Batman: Arkham Underworld	Dr. Achilles Milo	Voice, grouped under "English Voice Talent"
2018	Star Trek Online: Victory is Life	Quark	Voice, grouped under "Featured Guests"
2018	Lego DC Super-Villains	Psycho-Pirate, Condiment King	Voice, grouped under "English Voice Talent", credited as Armin Shimmerman
2019	Death Stranding	The Elder	Voice
2021	Ratchet & Clank: Rift Apart	Dr. Nefarious	Voice
2021	Psychonauts 2	Augustus Aquato	Voice, credited as Armin Shimmerman
2023	Starfield	Walter Stroud	Voice
2024	Batman: Arkham Shadow	Joe Chill	Voice
2025	Death Stranding 2: On the Beach	The Elder	Voice

=== Soundtrack performances ===
- Cop Rock (1990) - (performer: "He's Guilty") - Episode: "Pilot"
- What We Left Behind: Star Trek DS9 (2019) - (performer: "What We Left Behind")
- Ratchet and Clank: Rift Apart (2021) - (performer: "Join Me at the Top")

=== Writer work ===
- Evil Con Carne (2004) - (story - segment "Hector, King of the Britons") - Episode: "Jealousy, Jealous Do/Hector, King of the Britons"

=== Audio work ===
- The 34th Rule (2000) - Narrator, Quark
- Star Trek: Deep Space Nine: Legends of the Ferengi (2001) - Narrator, Quark
- Incident at Vichy (2002) - First Detective, Prof. Hoffman
- Magic Time (2005) - Narration
- Twelve Angry Men (2006) - Juror #4
- The War of the Worlds (2007) - Announcer, Others
- The Maltese Falcon (2008) - Wilmer
- Adventures in Odyssey (2009) - Prince George
- The Mark of Zorro (2011) - Tavern Landlord
- Die, Snow White! Die, Damn You!: A Very Grimm Tale (2012) - The Magic Mirror
- Wild Cards IV: Aces Abroad (2016) - Narration
- Magic Time: an Audio Play (2017) - Sam Lungo

=== Broadway work ===
- Threepenny Opera (1976-1977) - Mr. Charles Filch, Ed, Ensemble
- Saint Joan (1977-1978) - Baudricourt's Steward, Page to Warwick, Thomas de Courcelles, The English Soldier, Ensemble
- I Remember Mama (1979) - Mr. Thorkelson
- The Play That Goes Wrong (2022) - Dennis Tyde, Perkins

== Bibliography ==
- The 34th Rule (1998) (with David R. George III)
- The Merchant Prince (2000) (with Michael Scott)
- Outrageous Fortune (2002) (with Chelsea Quinn Yarbro)
- Capital Offense (2003)
- Betrayal of Angels (2020)
