= Andrew Robinson (actor) =

American actor and professor (born 1942)

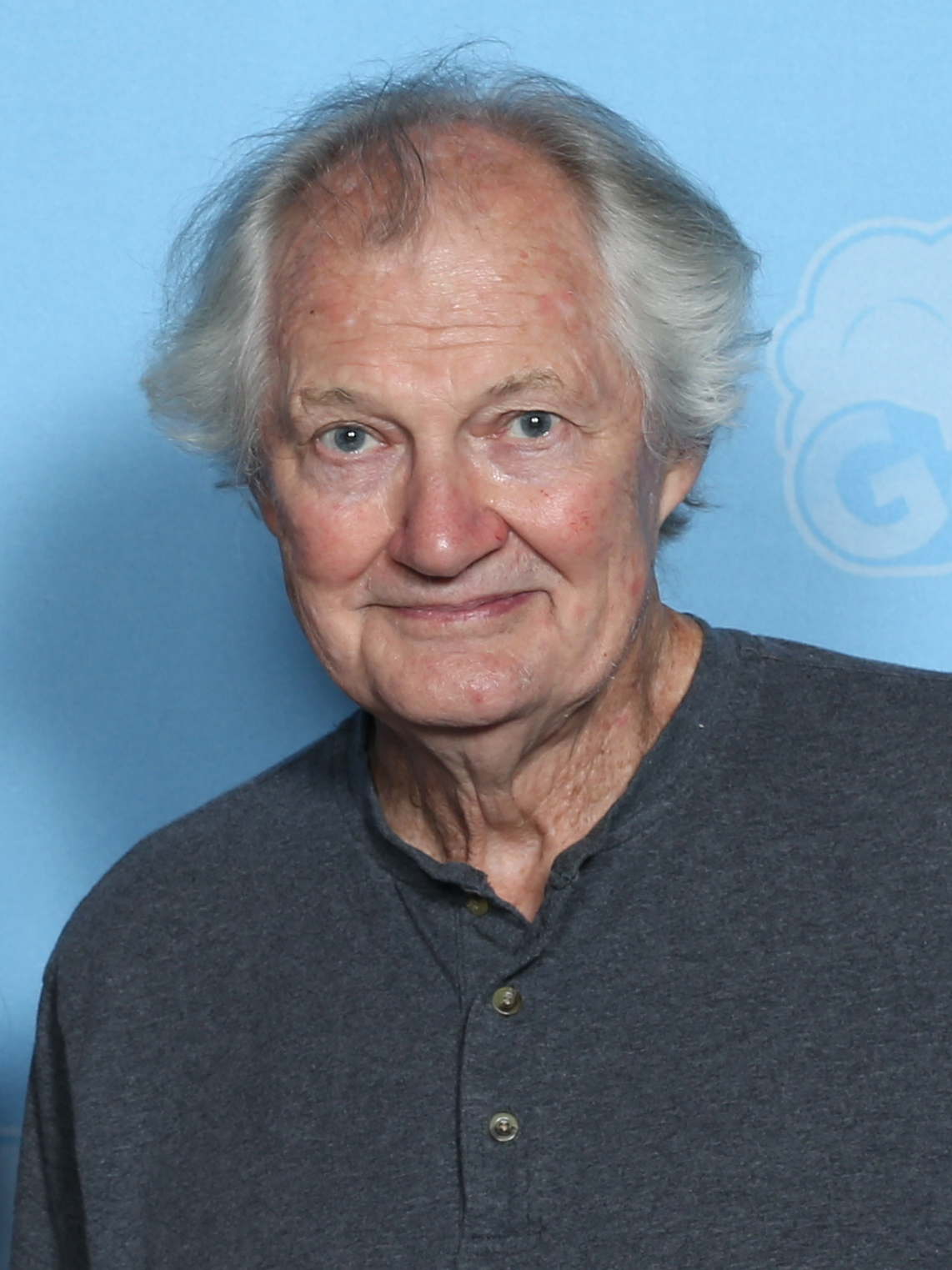
- Robinson at GalaxyCon Raleigh in 2022
- Born: Andrew Jordt Robinson; February 14, 1942 (age 84); New York City, U.S.
- Other name: Andy Robinson
- Education: University of New Hampshire; The New School for Social Research (BA); London Academy of Music and Dramatic Art
- Occupations: Actor; Former Director of the Master of Fine Arts Acting program at the University of Southern California
- Years active: 1969–present
- Spouse: Irene Robinson (m. 1970; died 2026)
- Children: 1

Andrew Jordt Robinson (born February 14, 1942) is an American actor and the former director of the Master of Fine Arts acting program at the University of Southern California. Originally a stage actor, he works predominantly in supporting roles on television and in low-budget films. He is known for his portrayals of the psychopathic serial killer Scorpio in Dirty Harry (1971), Larry Cotton in the horror film Hellraiser (1987), and Elim Garak in the television series Star Trek: Deep Space Nine (1993–1999).

== Early life ==
Robinson was born in New York City. His middle name, Jordt, was given to honor his grandfather, though he did not begin using it in his professional credits until the 1996 Deep Space Nine episode, "Body Parts". His father was a soldier in World War II and was killed when Robinson was three years old. After his death, he and his mother moved to Hartford, Connecticut, where he was raised with her family. In his later childhood, Robinson became a juvenile delinquent and was eventually sent to St. Andrew's School, a boarding school in Rhode Island.

After graduating from high school, Robinson attended the University of New Hampshire. After he picketed the school's Reserve Officers' Training Corps (ROTC) program his degree was withheld by the university, so he transferred to The New School for Social Research in New York City and graduated with a Bachelor of Arts in English. He originally intended to become a journalist but went into acting after earning a Fulbright Scholarship. After graduating, he went to the London Academy of Music and Dramatic Art on the scholarship.

== Career ==
Robinson's first professional roles were as a stage actor and playwright in New York. His first role in New York was in the play MacBird! He went on to appear in productions in North America and Europe, including Woyzeck, Futz, Werner Liepolt's "The Young Master Dante" and The Cannibals. In 1969, he had his first television role with a guest part on N.Y.P.D. at the age of 26. In 1971, he began acting in feature films.

=== Dirty Harry and typecasting ===
Robinson's first feature film role was in 1971's Dirty Harry. Don Siegel, the film's director, and Clint Eastwood picked Robinson for the role after seeing him in a production of Fyodor Dostoevsky's The Idiot. Robinson was cast as the Scorpio Killer, the film's antagonist. The Scorpio Killer was largely based on the contemporary real life Zodiac Killer, and Robinson integrated many known aspects of that serial killer's personality into his acting, such as a disturbed sense of humour and a sadistic inclination to taunt his pursuers. In the film, his character murders a young woman, a 10-year-old boy, a teenage girl and a police officer and takes a school bus full of young children hostage. His portrayal was so convincing that he received death threats after the film's release. Director Don Siegel noted that he cast Robinson because he had the face of "a choir boy."

Critical reactions to Robinson were generally positive. Box Office Magazine wrote: "Andy Robinson is the maniacal Scorpio ... a good blending of cunning and savagery." His role as Scorpio gave him widespread exposure, but Robinson also found himself typecast as "psycho" characters. He claimed the role severely limited his casting options, as film producers were reluctant to cast him in any "good guy" roles. Some of his notable "psycho" roles include a demented and ill-fated military barber in Child's Play 3 (1991) and the character Frank Cotton (in the skin of Larry Cotton, Robinson's actual character) in the horror film Hellraiser (1987), in which Robinson had his first lead role in a feature film.

=== Film and television, 1971–1992 ===
Robinson starred in Charley Varrick, a 1973 film that starred Walter Matthau and was directed by Don Siegel. Robinson played Frank Ryan on the soap opera Ryan's Hope from 1976 to 1978, for which he received a Daytime Emmy nomination.

Robinson has had many one-time and recurring roles on a wide variety of television shows, in including the miniseries Once an Eagle. His filmography includes guest roles on Bonanza, Marcus Welby, M.D., Kung Fu, Ironside, The Rookies, S.W.A.T., The Streets of San Francisco, Kojak, The Incredible Hulk, CHiPs, Mrs. Columbo, Harry O, Barnaby Jones, Vega$, Falcon Crest, The Greatest American Hero, The Dukes of Hazzard, Hart to Hart, The A-Team, Matt Houston, Moonlighting, L.A. Law, Matlock, Law & Order, Walker, Texas Ranger, Murder, She Wrote, The X-Files, The Practice, and Without a Trace.

In 1975 he co-starred as the sleazy, ill-fated chauffeur in the detective drama The Drowning Pool, starring Paul Newman.

In 1986, he played President John F. Kennedy in an episode of the 1980s revival of The Twilight Zone, "Profile in Silver". In 1988 he portrayed Liberace in a television biopic. Robinson had described it as one of his favorite roles and that "The most fun was wearing his furs and jewelry and singing 'I'll Be Seeing You.'" The New York Times reviewer noted that "Robinson does rather well in the leading role." He returned to the stage in 1993 with a Broadway production of Frank Gilroy's Any Given Day, but the play closed after only six weeks.

=== Star Trek: Deep Space Nine ===
In 1993, Robinson was cast in his first regular television role since Ryan's Hope in 1978. He played Elim Garak on Star Trek: Deep Space Nine, a Cardassian tailor, and a former operative of the Obsidian Order. The character was intended to be an enigmatic darkly comedic foil for the character of Julian Bashir (played by Alexander Siddig), and the two were often paired together onscreen. Prior to being cast in the role, Robinson knew little of the Star Trek franchise and had never seen an episode of any of the television series.

Robinson was offered the role of Garak after he originally auditioned for the role of Odo, which eventually went to René Auberjonois. He almost did not accept the role but was pressured into accepting for financial reasons.

=== Other works ===
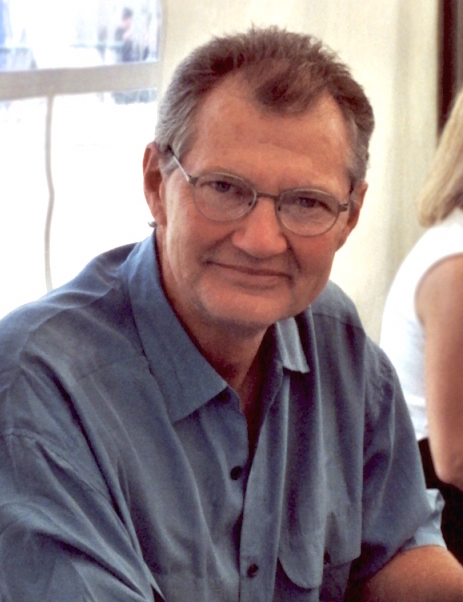
Robinson in 2000

After working on Deep Space Nine for several years, Robinson began a career in television directing, starting with the 1996 DS9 episode "Looking for par'Mach in All the Wrong Places". He went on to direct two episodes of Star Trek: Voyager and seven episodes of the courtroom drama Judging Amy, in which his real-life daughter, Rachel Robinson, was appearing.

In 2000, he wrote the novel A Stitch in Time, based on his character on Deep Space Nine. Robinson has stated that one of the reasons he wrote the novel was to get "total closure" of the character. He starred opposite DS9 costar Michael Dorn on an episode of Martial Law.

In 1993, Robinson was a founding member of The Matrix Theatre Company in Los Angeles.

In 2024, Robinson reprised his role as Elim Garak in Star Trek: Lower Decks.

== Personal life ==
He met his wife Irene after wrapping a production of Springvoices and the two married in 1970. He has two stepsons from his wife's previous marriage, and a daughter. Irene died in 2026.

In 1978 Robinson left full-time acting for five years and concentrated on raising his family in the small mountain community of Idyllwild, California, about 150 miles (240 km) from Los Angeles. During that time he taught community theatre for middle and high school students and worked as a carpenter. He returned to acting full-time in the mid-1980s.

== Filmography ==
=== Film ===
| Year | Film | Role | Notes |
|---|---|---|---|
| 1971 | Dirty Harry | The Scorpio Killer | (as Andy Robinson) |
| 1973 | Charley Varrick | Harman Sullivan | |
| 1975 | The Drowning Pool | Pat Reavis | |
| 1975 | A Woman for All Men | Steve McCoy | |
| 1975 | Mackintosh and T.J. | Coley | |
| 1985 | Mask | Dr. Vinton | |
| 1986 | Cobra | Detective Monte | |
| 1987 | Hellraiser | Larry Cotton / Frank Cotton | |
| 1987 | The Verne Miller Story | Charles "Pretty Boy" Floyd | |
| 1988 | Shoot to Kill | Harvey | |
| 1990 | Fatal Charm | Sheriff Harry Childs | |
| 1991 | Child's Play 3 | Sergeant Botnick | |
| 1991 | Prime Target | Commissioner | |
| 1992 | Trancers III | Colonel Daddy Muthuh | |
| 1994 | Pumpkinhead II: Blood Wings | Sheriff Sean Braddock | |
| 1994 | There Goes My Baby | Frank | |
| 1994 | The Puppet Masters | Hawthorne | |
| 1998 | Running Woman | Captain Don Gibbs | |
| 1998 | Archibald the Rainbow Painter | The Super Super | |
| 2003 | The Making of Daniel Boone | Timothy Flint | |
| 2004 | Homeland Security | Senator | |
| 2005 | A Question of Loyalty | Dr. Albert Krentz | Short |

=== Television ===
| Year | Show | Role | Notes |
|---|---|---|---|
| 1972 | Bonanza | John Harper | Episode: "Forever" (as Andy Robinson) |
| 1972 | The Rookies | Lee Borden | Episode: "To Taste of Terror" (as Andy Robinson) |
| 1972 | The Catcher | Andy Hendricks | TV film: NBC World Premiere Movie |
| 1974 | Marcus Welby, M.D. | Chris Bakewell | Episode: "Each Day a Miracle" |
| 1974 | Ironside | David Cutter | Episode: "Come Eleven, Come Twelve" |
| 1974 | Kung Fu | Johnny Walker | Episode: "Crossties" |
| 1974 | The Family Kovack | Butch Kovack | TV film |
| 1974 | The Rookies | Billy Kempson | Season 3 Episode 8 - "Prelude to Vengeance" |
| 1975 | Kojak | Leon | Episode: "I Want To Report a Dream" |
| 1975 | Someone I Touched | Frank Berlin | ABC Movie of the Week |
| 1975, 1977 | The Streets of San Francisco | Archie Kimbro | Episode: "Spooks for Sale" & "The Cannibals" |
| 1975, 1977 | The Streets of San Francisco | Ron Maguire | Episode: "The Cannibals" |
| 1976 | S.W.A.T. | Edward Stillman | Episode: "Any Second Now" |
| 1976 | Once an Eagle | Reb Rayburne | TV miniseries |
| 1976–1978 | Ryan's Hope | Frank Ryan #2 | Daytime Emmy Award nomination |
| 1976–1980 | Barnaby Jones | Various characters | Recurring |
| 1978 | Kojak | Roger Layton | Episode: "Photo Must Credit Joe Paxton" |
| 1978 | The Incredible Hulk | Dr. Stan Rhodes | Episode: "Life and Death" |
| 1978 | The Eddie Capra Mysteries | Greg Chandler | Episode: "Murder on the Flip Side" |
| 1979 | From Here to Eternity | Sergeant Maylon Stark | TV miniseries |
| 1979 | Chips | Bill Clayton | Episode: "Hot Wheels" |
| 1980 | Vega$ | Derek Razzio | Recurring |
| 1980 | The Dukes of Hazzard | Billy Joe Billings | |
| 1980–1983 | Hart to Hart | Mike | Season 2 Episode 3 & Season 4 Episode 12 |
| 1983 | The A-Team | Jackson | Episode: "The Beast from the Belly of a Boeing" |
| 1983 | The A-Team | Deputy Rance | Episode: "The White Ballot" |
| 1985 | Not My Kid | Dr. Royce | TV film |
| 1985 | The Atlanta Child Murders | Jack Mallard | Television miniseries |
| 1985 | Cagney & Lacey | Frank Kelly | Episode: "Filial Duty" |
| 1986–1987 | The Twilight Zone | John F. Kennedy | Episode: "Profile in Silver" |
| 1986–1987 | The Twilight Zone | Mr. Williams | Episode: "Private Channel" |
| 1988 | Liberace | Liberace | TV film |
| 1989 | Moonlighting | Leslie Hunziger | Episode: "Plastic Fantastic Lovers" |
| 1990–1991 | Matlock | Stanley Hayden | Episode: "The Broker" |
| 1990–1991 | Matlock | Frank Hayes | Episode: "The Defense" |
| 1991 | Rock Hudson | Henry Willson | TV film |
| 1992 | Law & Order | Phillip Mariietta | Episode: "Consultation" |
| 1993 | Walker, Texas Ranger | Congressman Leo Cabe | Episode: "A Shadow in the Night" |
| 1993–1994 | Murder, She Wrote | Ambrosse | Episode:"A Killing in Cork" |
| 1993–1994 | Murder, She Wrote | James Harris | Episode: "An Egg to Die For" |
| 1993–1999 | Star Trek: Deep Space Nine | Garak | 37 episodes |
| 1994 | M.A.N.T.I.S. | Solomon Box | 3 episodes |
| 1994 | Wings | Michael Foster | Episode: "The Person Formerly Known as Lowell Mather" |
| 1996 | Days of Our Lives | Yuri | |
| 1997–1998 | Star Trek: Voyager | – | Directed two episodes |
| 1999 | The X-Files | Dr. Ian Detweiler | Episode: "Alpha" |
| 1999–2004 | JAG | Admiral Thomas Kly | Recurring |
| 1999–2005 | Judging Amy | Daniel McGill | Directed seven episodes |
| 2002 | Presidio Med | Jesse | Recurring |
| 2004 | Without a Trace | Carl Monroe | Episode: "Upstairs Downstairs" |
| 2004 | The Practice | Edmond Solomon | Episode: "The Firm" |
| 2016 | The Metropolitan Opera HD Live | Three Masks | Episode: "Puccini: Turandot" |
| 2021 | Dota: Dragon's Blood | Indrak | Episode: "The Fire Sermon" |
| 2024 | Star Trek: Lower Decks | Alternate Garak (voice) | Episode: "Fissure Quest" |
| 2026 | Spider-Noir | Ogden Faber | 2 episodes |

== Writing ==
- A Stitch in Time (2000, Pocket Books, ISBN 0-671-03885-0); novel set in the world of Star Trek: Deep Space Nine
