= Star Trek: Deep Space Nine: Harbinger =

1996 Star Trek video game

Star Trek: Deep Space Nine – Harbinger
- Developer: Stormfront Studios
- Publisher: Viacom New Media
- Designers: Mark Buchignani; Sarah W. Stocker
- Programmer: Mark Buchignani
- Artist: David Bunnett
- Writer: Sarah W. Stocker
- Composer: Steven Scherer
- Series: Star Trek
- Platforms: MS-DOS, Mac OS
- Release: March 1996
- Genre: Adventure
- Mode: Single player

Star Trek: Deep Space Nine – Harbinger is a video game for the MS-DOS and Apple Macintosh operating systems released in March 1996. The game is based upon the television series Star Trek: Deep Space Nine. It was the first Star Trek: Deep Space Nine video game to be released for the PC.

Several cast members provided voices for their characters in this game, including Avery Brooks as Sisko.

== Plot ==
The player character, Envoy Bannick, is on special assignment to a newly discovered race in the Gamma Quadrant. On the return trip through the wormhole, Bannick is attacked by some sort of alien drones and, despite assistance by Deep Space Nine, crashes into its docking ring while on emergency approach.

Once Bannick arrives on the station, he discovers most of it has been abandoned except for senior staff due to a plasma storm in the vicinity. The Defiant is missing and on evacuation duty as well, leaving only two runabouts and an ambassadorial ship from the alien race Bannick was negotiating with docked at the station.

Almost immediately after arrival, Deep Space Nine is attacked by the same hostiles that attacked the runabout. After driving them off, Bannick attempts to contact the ambassador, only to find him murdered.

After solving the murder and discovering how exactly the new aliens know of the drones that are attacking the station in increasingly strong waves, Bannick and Major Kira mount an attack on the drone factory homeworld, attempting to stop the final assault which will destroy Deep Space Nine and swarm Bajor afterwards.

With the attack thwarted and the runabout destroyed, Bannick and Kira evacuate on a custom built drone, back to the station as the factory world explodes.

== Reception ==
Computer Gaming World gave the game a positive review, with the author commenting: "The 'guest star' design works very well—it's a lot of fun to interact with Sisko, Quark, Dax and the others."

Next Generation panned the game, saying that it "manages to take the worst parts of The Hive and mesh them with the annoying, incoherent puzzles of The 11th Hour." The reviewer also found the storyline contrived, and scored the game one out of five stars.

Star Trek: Deep Space Nine: Harbinger received a CODiE award in 1997 for Best Use of Live Performers in Multimedia.

== See also ==
- Star Trek: Deep Space Nine
- Star Trek: Deep Space Nine: The Fallen
- Star Trek: Deep Space Nine: Dominion Wars
- Harbinger (Star Trek: Enterprise) (2004 Enterprise episode with similar name)
- Harbinger (Star Trek novel) (novel)
