= NGC 321 =

Elliptical galaxy in the Cetus constellation

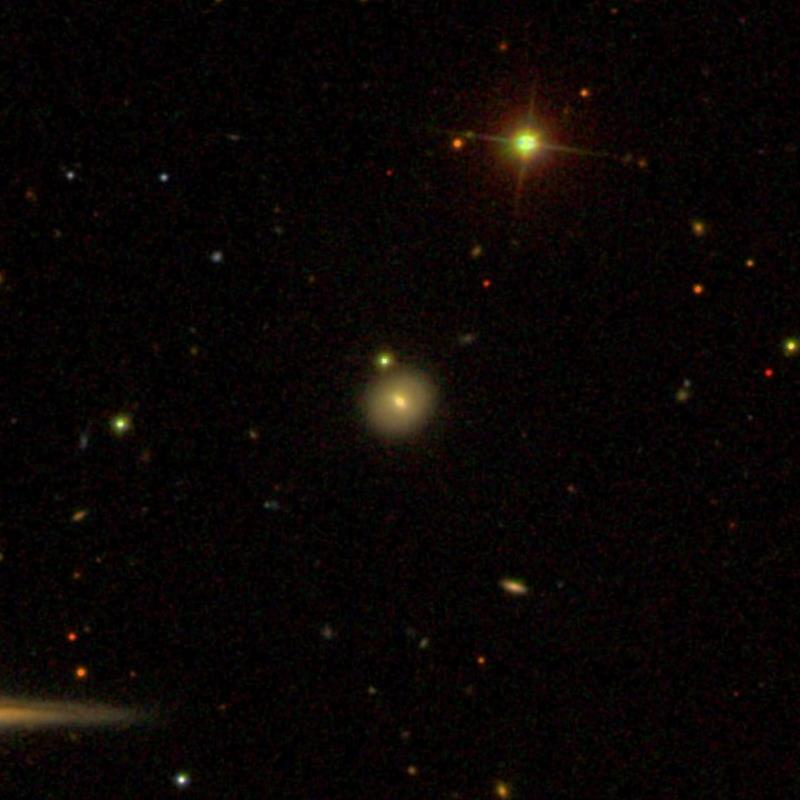
- SDSS image of NGC 321

Observation data (J2000 epoch)
- Constellation: Cetus
- Right ascension: 00^{h} 57^{m} 39.23461^{s}
- Declination: −05° 05′ 10.1616″
- Redshift: 0.01616
- Heliocentric radial velocity: 4806 km/s
- Apparent magnitude (B): 16

Characteristics
- Type: E

Other designations
- MCG -01-03-043, PGC 3443

NGC 321 is an elliptical galaxy located in the constellation Cetus. It was discovered on September 27, 1864, by the astronomer Albert Marth. Measurements of its redshift put it at a distance of about 217.4 ± 15.4 megalight-years (66.67 ± 4.73 Mpc), assuming a Hubble constant of H_{0} = 67.8 km/sec/Mpc.

A fictional star cluster with the same designation was the location of the planet Eminiar VII in the original series Star Trek episode "A Taste of Armageddon".
