= NGC 329 =

Spiral galaxy in the constellation Cetus

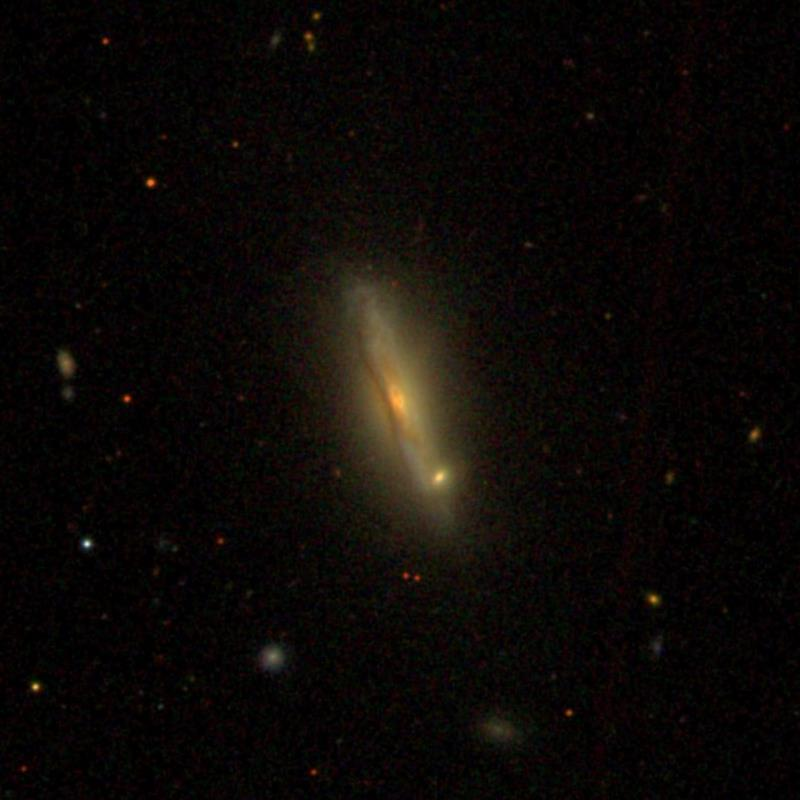
- SDSS image of NGC 329

Observation data (J2000 epoch)
- Constellation: Cetus
- Right ascension: 00^{h} 58^{m} 01.6^{s}
- Declination: −05° 04′ 16″
- Redshift: 0.017569
- Heliocentric radial velocity: 5,267 km/s
- Apparent magnitude (V): 14.40

Characteristics
- Type: Sb
- Apparent size (V): 1.6' × 0.6'

Other designations
- MCG -01-03-048, 2MASX J00580158-0504165, 2MASXi J0058016-050416, IRAS F00555-0520, 6dF J0058016-050416, PGC 3467.

NGC 329 is a spiral galaxy in the constellation Cetus. It was discovered on September 27, 1864 by Albert Marth. It was described by Dreyer as "faint, extended."

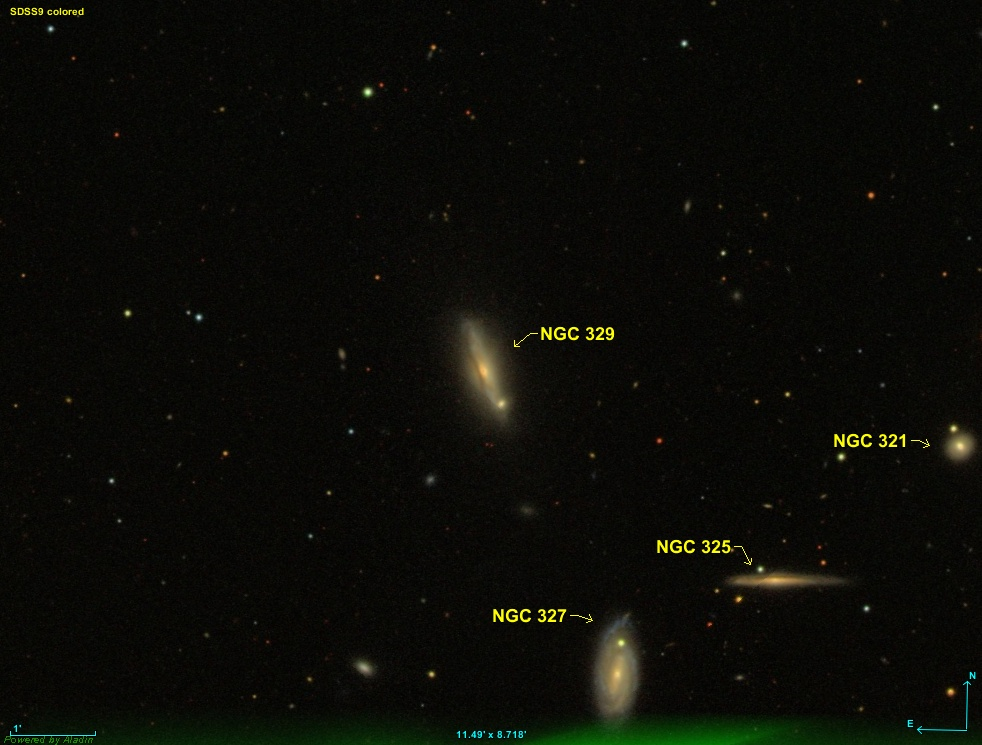
NGC 329 (SDSS)
