= A Taste of Armageddon =

- Star Trek: The Original Series episode
- Episode no.: Season 1 Episode 23
- Directed by: Joseph Pevney
- Story by: Robert Hamner
- Teleplay by: Gene L. Coon; Robert Hamner
- Cinematography by: Jerry Finnerman
- Production code: 023
- Original air date: February 23, 1967

Guest appearances
- David Opatoshu — Anan 7; Gene Lyons — Ambassador Robert Fox; Barbara Babcock — Mea 3; Miko Mayama — Yeoman Tamura; David L. Ross — Lt. Galloway; Sean Kenney — Lt. DePaul; Robert Sampson — Sar 6

Episode chronology
← Previous "Space Seed"	Next → "This Side of Paradise"
- Star Trek: The Original Series season 1

"A Taste of Armageddon" is the twenty-third episode of the first season of the American science fiction television series Star Trek. Written by Robert Hamner and Gene L. Coon and directed by Joseph Pevney, it was first broadcast on February 23, 1967.

In the episode, the crew of the Enterprise visits a planet engaged in a completely computer-simulated war with a neighboring planet, but the casualties, including the Enterprise's crew, are all too real.

== Plot ==
The USS Enterprise travels to Eminiar VII in "star cluster NGC 321", bringing Ambassador Robert Fox to establish diplomatic relations. Little is known about Eminiar VII, beyond the fact that they have been at war with a neighboring planet, Vendikar.

Nearing Eminiar VII, the Enterprise receives a message from the planet warning them not to approach, but Ambassador Fox orders Captain Kirk to proceed. Kirk, First Officer Spock, and additional security personnel beam down to the planet, where they are met by representatives Mea 3 and Anan 7. During a supposed attack by Vendikar, Anan 7 explains that the war is conducted as a computer simulation, and that the Enterprise has been "destroyed" in the attack. The two planets have a treaty, according to which they must kill the "victims" of every simulated attack. The crew are therefore expected to report to Eminiar's disintegration chambers for execution, and Kirk's party is taken captive. Spock telepathically plants a suggestion in their jailer's mind, allowing them to escape.

Anan 7 uses a voice duplicator to imitate Kirk's voice and order the crew to transport down. Scotty, suspicious, has the ship's computer analyze the message and confirms it is fake. He orders shields raised. When the crew fails to transport down, Eminiar fires upon them, but the attack is deflected by the shields. Contacted by Ambassador Fox in further efforts at diplomacy, Anan 7 claims the attack was due to an innocent miscalculation. Fox, deciding to believe Anan, beams down and is taken to a disintegration chamber, where Spock and the security officers rescue him.

Kirk confronts Anan 7, but is overpowered by guards and taken to the Eminian council chamber. When Anan 7 opens a channel to the Enterprise, Kirk orders Scotty to execute "General Order 24" before being cut off. Kirk explains that he has ordered the ship to destroy Eminiar VII within two hours. Panic ensues, allowing Kirk to disarm the guards. Spock arrives, and they destroy the war simulation computers. Anan 7, horrified, protests that a real war will inevitably follow, but Kirk points out that Vendikar is no doubt just as horrified, and that both sides now have an incentive to make peace. He suggests that Anan 7 call a ceasefire and begin peace negotiations, and Ambassador Fox agrees to act as a neutral mediator.

== Reception ==
The title of "Armageddon Game", a 1994 episode of Star Trek: Deep Space Nine, was chosen by writer Robert Hewitt Wolfe as an homage to this episode.

Zack Handlen of The A.V. Club gave the episode a "B+" rating. He described the story as "one of Trek's classic allegorically powerful, common sense implausible scenarios." Handlen criticised a premise that had "a few too many holes to sustain its attempts at profundity" but praised the story's ambition.

In 2016, The Hollywood Reporter rated "A Taste of Armageddon" the 53rd best television episode of all Star Trek franchise television prior to Star Trek: Discovery, including live-action and the animated series, but not counting the movies. Out of just the original series episodes, they ranked it the 18th best episode. In 2016, Business Insider ranked "A Taste of Armageddon" the 11th best episode of the original series.

In 2017, it was rated the 8th most hopeful Star Trek, which despite some grim scenes culminates in the ending of a 500-year-old war. In 2017, Business Insider listed "A Taste of Armageddon" as one of the most underrated episodes of the Star Trek franchise.

In 2018, Collider ranked this episode the 8th best original series episode.

In 2020, ScreenRant ranked it as the 8th best episode of TOS to re-watch.

In 2021, Den of Geek ranked this the number one episode of the original series. That year, the episode was quoted by characters in the science fiction show For All Mankind, in the episode "Triage," where "A Taste of Armageddon" was compared to the series' alternate history Cold War setting.

== See also ==
- "The Lottery"
