= Prime Factors (Star Trek: Voyager) =

- Star Trek: Voyager episode
- Episode no.: Season 1 Episode 10
- Directed by: Les Landau
- Story by: David R. George III; Eric A. Stillwell
- Teleplay by: Greg Elliot; Michael Perricone
- Production code: 110
- Original air date: March 20, 1995

Guest appearances
- Josh Clark - Lt. Joe Carey; Martha Hackett - Seska; Ronald Guttman - Gath; Andrew Hill Newman - Jaret Otel; Yvonne Suhor - Eudana

Episode chronology
← Previous "Emanations"	Next → "State of Flux"
- Star Trek: Voyager season 1

"Prime Factors" is the tenth episode of Star Trek: Voyager, a science fiction series set in the 24th century about a spacecraft stranded on the other side of the Galaxy that must make its way back to Earth. The ship is led by Captain Kathryn Janeway who must manage a crew of Starfleet and Maquis.

This teleplay was written by Greg Elliot and Michael Perricone, based on a story written by David R. George III and Eric A. Stillwell, and directed by Les Landau. This episode first aired on UPN on March 20, 1995.

Voyager picks up a distress call and makes contact with a new world and its inhabitants. The crew encounters a variety of aliens portrayed by Ronald Guttman as Gath, Yvonne Suhor as Eudana, and Andrew Hill Newman as Jaret. Voyager's crew including Martha Hackett as Seska and Josh Clark as Lieutenant Joe Carey also appear in the episode.

== Plot ==
Voyager encounters a hedonistic and hospitable race known as the Sikarians and is invited to visit their homeworld. Shore leave is organized, and during the visit, Ensign Harry Kim and a Sikarian transport themselves to another planet, Alastria. Kim deduces that the Sikarian teleporter device, known as the trajector, has transported them 40,000 light-years.

When Captain Janeway is informed, she asks Gath, the leader of the Sikarians, if the technology could be used to transport Voyager further towards the Alpha Quadrant. Her request is refused because Sikarian laws forbid sharing technology. The crew consider how they can bargain for technology, and Kim remembers that stories are valued by the Sikarians. Janeway offers Voyager's entire library of literature if the Sikarians will transport Voyager. Gath promises to discuss the offer with the other Sikarian leaders.

In engineering, Seska, Torres, and Carey examine the spatial rift caused by the trajector to understand how it works. Later, Kim is approached by a civilian who offers to hand over the technology illegally in exchange for the literature. Janeway is reluctant to authorize an illicit trade, so she beams down to pressure Gath once again, but Gath never intended to accept her offer and orders Voyager to leave. Janeway returns to Voyager and orders the recall of all personnel.

Torres, Carey, and Seska have downloaded the library and head to the transporter room. While trying to access the transporter, Tuvok walks in on them, but instead of condemning them, he beams to the surface and makes the exchange himself. He returns to Voyager with the trajector, instructing the engineering team not to attempt to use it until he has spoken with Janeway. Nevertheless, Seska connects the trajector to a console port in engineering so that they can examine it. They discover that the technology relies on the massive crystalline mantle of the planet as an amplifier, so that once they depart, the trajector will be useless. As Voyager is about to depart, Torres and Seska activate the trajector. The field forming around the ship produces anti-neutrinos, which causes the warp core to begin building to a breach. Unable to disengage the trajector from the console, Torres destroys it with a phaser.

Janeway is shocked to discover that Tuvok, her friend and counsel, had been involved in the conspiracy. She lets Torres off with a stern warning and asks Tuvok to consult her in future before acting.

== Reception ==
Reviewers Lance Parkin and Mark Jones considered the episode a strong one, even though they compared the Sikarians to "refugees from Barbarella" because of their European accents and high culture.

This achieved 7.3 Nielsen points when it was aired in March 1995.

In 2020, The Digital Fix felt this episode had some of the "most ambitious storytelling" in season one of Star Trek: Voyager.

In 2022, in a review for Gizmodo, a writer said of the episode: "A lot of Voyager's first season explores how the crew will get back home, but one early episode explores the dramatic potential in a surprisingly tragic way".

== Star Trek: Picard ==
The Sikarians are referenced again in Star Trek: Picard, season 1 episode 6, "The Impossible Box", in which the Borg had assimilated a number of Sikarians and acquired their trajector technology, integrating it into Borg cubes for the quick escape of a Borg Queen.
