= David R. George III =

American science fiction writer

- Occupation: Writer/novelist
- Writing career
- Language: English
- Genre: Science fiction
- Notable work: Star Trek novels

David R. George III is an American science fiction writer. His earliest Star Trek work was the Star Trek: Voyager episode "Prime Factors", and he has since written several novels set in the franchise, including The 34th Rule, three books of the Star Trek: Typhon Pact miniseries and the first book of Star Trek: The Fall.

== Star Trek ==
George was a fan of Star Trek as a teenager, saying that the first episode he saw was "The Corbomite Maneuver". His earliest credit in the Star Trek franchise was a television episode. Together with Eric A. Stillwell, he pitched successfully a story which became the Star Trek: Voyager episode "Prime Factors". The pitches took place during the filming of the pilot episode, "Caretaker" and so were only based on the series bible having not been able to see any actual episodes of the show. He said that writing in that medium was fulfilling but did not enjoy the time pressures.

Following this, Stillwell and actor Armin Shimerman pitched ideas for Star Trek: Deep Space Nine but none of their stories were picked up. Later, when Stillwell and George received a request for stories for the Star Trek comic books they found a pitch based on George Takei's experiences of the Japanese American internment during the Second World War. Shimerman suggested that they take the idea to Pocket Books to see if it could be made into a novel; it was subsequently accepted and George and Shimerman developed the idea into The 34th Rule. George was involved in writing some of the elements of the Star Trek: Typhon Pact series of books, which had been originally conceived by Marco Palmieri and initially introduced in the novel A Singular Destiny by Keith R.A. DeCandido. George wrote two of the novels in that miniseries, Plagues of Night and Raise the Dawn.

In his novel Allegiance In Exile, set at the start of the fourth year of the voyage of Captain James T. Kirk's USS Enterprise, George was pleased to be able to include Hikaru Sulu in a major role as he felt he was underused in Star Trek: The Original Series. On August 27, 2013, Revelation and Dust was published by Simon & Schuster. The book was the first part of a five book miniseries entitled The Fall which was intended to bring together the novels of The Next Generation and Deep Space Nine. His book was the first to be set after the destruction of the Deep Space Nine space station earlier in the series of novels set after the television episodes. As part of the novel, he requested that a design of the new station was created so it could appear on the cover of the novel.

== Other works ==
George has also had two original novelettes published in anthologies. These were the stories Moon Over Luna in Thrilling Wonder Stories, Volume 2 and Native Lands in The Instruments of Vice.
